= Balingen (electoral district) =

State electoral district of Germany

63: Balingen
- Electoral district for the Landtag of Baden-Württemberg
- Balingen in 2026
- District: Zollernalbkreis and Tübingen
- Electorate: 120,762 (2026)
- Major settlements: Albstadt, Balingen, Bisingen, Bitz, Dautmergen, Dormettingen, Dotternhausen, Geislingen, Grosselfingen, Haigerloch, Hausen am Tann, Meßstetten, Nusplingen, Obernheim, Rangendingen, Ratshausen, Rosenfeld, Schömberg, Straßberg, Weilen unter der Burg, Hirrlingen, and Starzach

Current electoral district
- Party: CDU
- Member: Nicole Hoffmeister-Kraut

Balingen is an electoral constituency (German: Wahlkreis) represented in the Landtag of Baden-Württemberg. Since 2026, it has elected one member via first-past-the-post voting. Voters cast a second vote under which additional seats are allocated proportionally state-wide. Under the constituency numbering system, it is designated as constituency 63. It is split between the districts of Zollernalbkreis and Tübingen.

== Geography ==
The constituency includes –

- The municipalities of Albstadt, Balingen, Bisingen, Bitz, Dautmergen, Dormettingen, Dotternhausen, Geislingen, Grosselfingen, Haigerloch, Hausen am Tann, Meßstetten, Nusplingen, Obernheim, Rangendingen, Ratshausen, Rosenfeld, Schömberg, Straßberg, and Weilen unter der Burg within the district of Zollernalbkreis.
- The municipalities of Hirrlingen and Starzach, within the district of Tübingen.

There were 120,762 eligible voters in 2026.

== Members ==
=== First mandate ===
Both prior to and since the electoral reforms for the 2026 election, the winner of the plurality of the vote (first-past-the-post) in every constituency won the first mandate.

Election	Member	Party	%
1976	Heinrich Haasis	CDU	
1980	Heinrich Haasis	CDU	
1984	Heinrich Haasis	CDU	
1988	Heinrich Haasis	CDU	
1992	Heinrich Haasis	CDU	
1996	Heinrich Haasis	CDU	
2001	Günther-Martin Pauli	CDU	
2006	Günther-Martin Pauli	CDU	50.1
2011	Günther-Martin Pauli	CDU	46.3
2016	Nicole Hoffmeister-Kraut	CDU	29.5
2021	Nicole Hoffmeister-Kraut	CDU	32.6
2026	Nicole Hoffmeister-Kraut	CDU	42.9

=== Second mandate ===
Prior to the electoral reforms for the 2026 election, the seats in the state parliament were allocated proportionately amongst parties which received more than 5% of valid votes across the state. The seats that were won proportionally for parties that did not win as many first mandates as seats they were entitled to, were allocated to their candidates which received the highest proportion of the vote in their respective constituencies. This meant that following some elections, a constituency would have one or more members elected under a second mandate.

Prior to 2011, these second mandates were allocated to the party candidates who got the greatest number of votes, whilst from 2011-2021, these were allocated according to percentage share of the vote.

Election	Member	Party
1976	Horst Kiesecker	SPD
1980	Horst Kiesecker	SPD
1984		
1988
1992	Horst Kiesecker	SPD
1996		
2001	Hans-Martin Haller	SPD
2006	Hans-Martin Haller	SPD
2011	Hans-Martin Haller	SPD
2016	Stefan Herre	AfD
Nov 2019	Stefan Herre	Ind
2021	Hans-Peter Hörner	AfD

== Election results ==
=== 2026 election ===
State election (2026): Balingen
Notes:	Blue background denotes the winner of the electorate vote. Pink background denotes a candidate elected from their party list. Yellow background denotes an electorate win by a list member, or other incumbent. A ✓ or ✗ denotes status of any incumbent, win or lose respectively.						
Party	Candidate	Votes	%	±%	Party votes	%	±%
CDU	✓ Nicole Hoffmeister-Kraut	34,952	42.9	▲10.2	27,511	33.6	▲1.0
AfD	Hans-Peter Hörner	21,372	26.2	▲14.0	21,570	26.3	▲14.1
Greens	Maurice Rößler	11,948	14.7	▼11.8	18,109	22.1	▼4.3
SPD	Katja Weiger-Schick	5,417	6.6	▼1.2	3,549	4.3	▼3.5
FDP	Albrecht Raible	3,355	4.1	▼5.9	3,571	4.4	▼5.6
Left	Elena Krein	2,821	3.5	▲1.1	2,310	2.8	▲0.4
FW					1,334	1.6	▼0.7
BSW					1,180	1.4	
APT					837	1.0	
Volt	Anne Weiß	1,123	1.4		467	0.6	
Bündnis Deutschland	Stefan Buck	530	0.7				
PARTEI					262	0.3	▼1.2
dieBasis					228	0.3	▼0.7
Values					214	0.3	
Bündnis C					185	0.2	
Pensioners					165	0.2	
ÖDP					111	0.1	▼0.6
Team Todenhöfer					102	0.1	
Verjüngungsforschung					76	0.1	
PdF					51	0.1	
KlimalisteBW					27	0.0	▼0.9
Humanists					23	0.0	
Informal votes		937			573		
Total valid votes		81,518			81,882		
Turnout		82,455	68.3	▲6.8			
CDU hold	Majority	13,580	16.7				

== See also ==
- Politics of Baden-Württemberg
- Landtag of Baden-Württemberg
