= Dotternhausen =

- Municipality
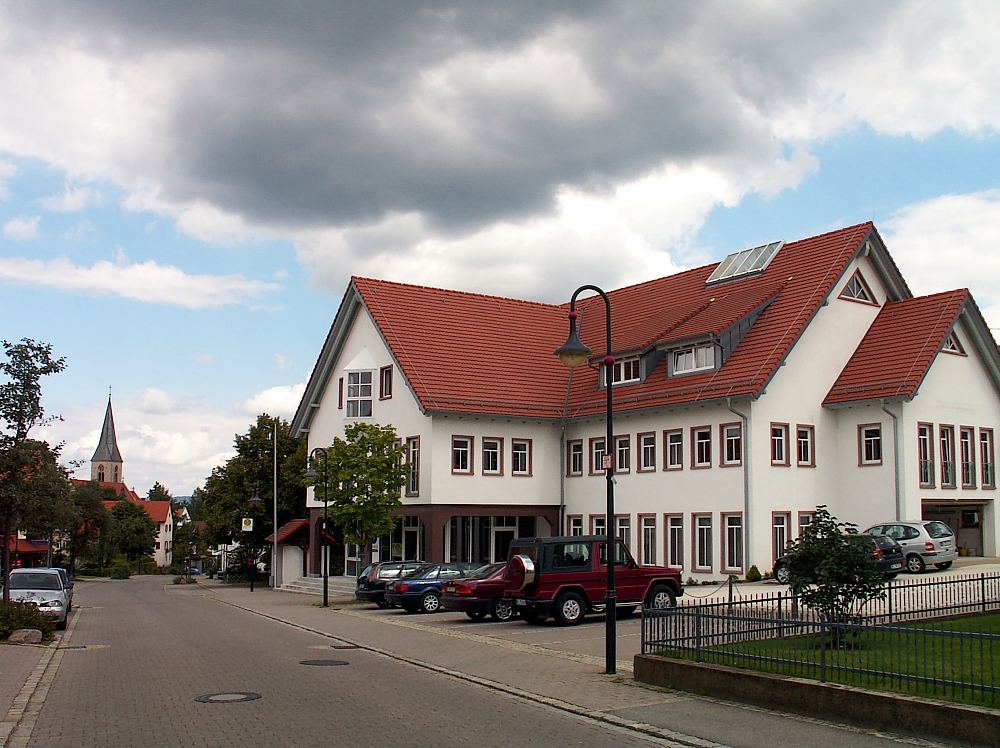
- Dotternhausen town hall

- Coat of arms

- Location of Dotternhausen within Zollernalbkreis district
- Interactive map of Dotternhausen
- Location within Germany Location within Baden-Württemberg
- Coordinates: 48°13′41″N 08°47′34″E
- Country: Germany
- State: Baden-Württemberg
- Admin. region: Tübingen
- District: Zollernalbkreis

Government
  - Mayor (2020–28): Marion Maier

Area
  - Total: 10.00 km^{2} (3.86 sq mi)
- Elevation: 666 m (2,185 ft)

Population (2025-12-31)
  - Total: 1,799
  - Density: 179.9/km^{2} (465.9/sq mi)
- Time zone: UTC+01:00 (CET)
  - Summer (DST): UTC+02:00 (CEST)
- Postal codes: 72359
- Dialling codes: 07427
- Vehicle registration: BL
- Website: www.dotternhausen.de

Dotternhausen is a municipality in the Zollernalbkreis district, in Baden-Württemberg, Germany.

== History ==
Dotternhausen became a possession of the Kingdom of Württemberg in 1805 and was assigned to Oberamt Balingen. In 1810, it was reassigned to Oberamt Spaichingen and then to Oberamt Rottweil in 1842. That district was dissolved in 1938, so Dotternhausen was again reassigned, this time to the newly created Landkreis Balingen. Dotternhausen began period of steady growth after World War II, particularly in the 1950s and 1960s. In 1973, when Baden-Württemberg reorganized its administrative geography, and Dotternhausen was assigned to the new district of Zollernalb.

== Geography ==
The municipality (Gemeinde) of Dotternhausen covers 10 square kilometers (3.9 sq mi) of the Zollernalb district of Baden-Württemberg, one of the 16 States of the Federal Republic of Germany. It is physically located along the edge of the Swabian Jura, with the town of Dotternhausen at the foot of the Plettenberg. The primary watercourses in the municipal area are the Schlichem, which forms its southern border, and the Katzenbach, which flows into the Eyach near Balingen. Elevation above sea level in the municipality ranges from a low of 579 meters (1,900 ft) Normalnull (NN) to a high of 1,002 meters (3,287 ft) NN at the top of the Plettenberg.

A portion of the Federally-protected Plettenkeller nature reserve is located in Dotternhausen's municipal area.

== Coat of arms ==
Dotternhausen's coat of arms displays a stag in yellow, posed and facing left, over a field of blue. This pattern was used by the Lords of Dotternhausen Castle, but the blue-yellow tincture was an addition by the municipal government. The coat of arms was approved by the Reichsstatthalter of Württemberg on 20 December 1938.

== Transportation ==
Dotternhausen is connected to Germany's network of Federal highways by Bundesstraße 27. Local rail traffic is made up entirely of freight trains.
