= Ratshausen =

German municipality

- Municipality
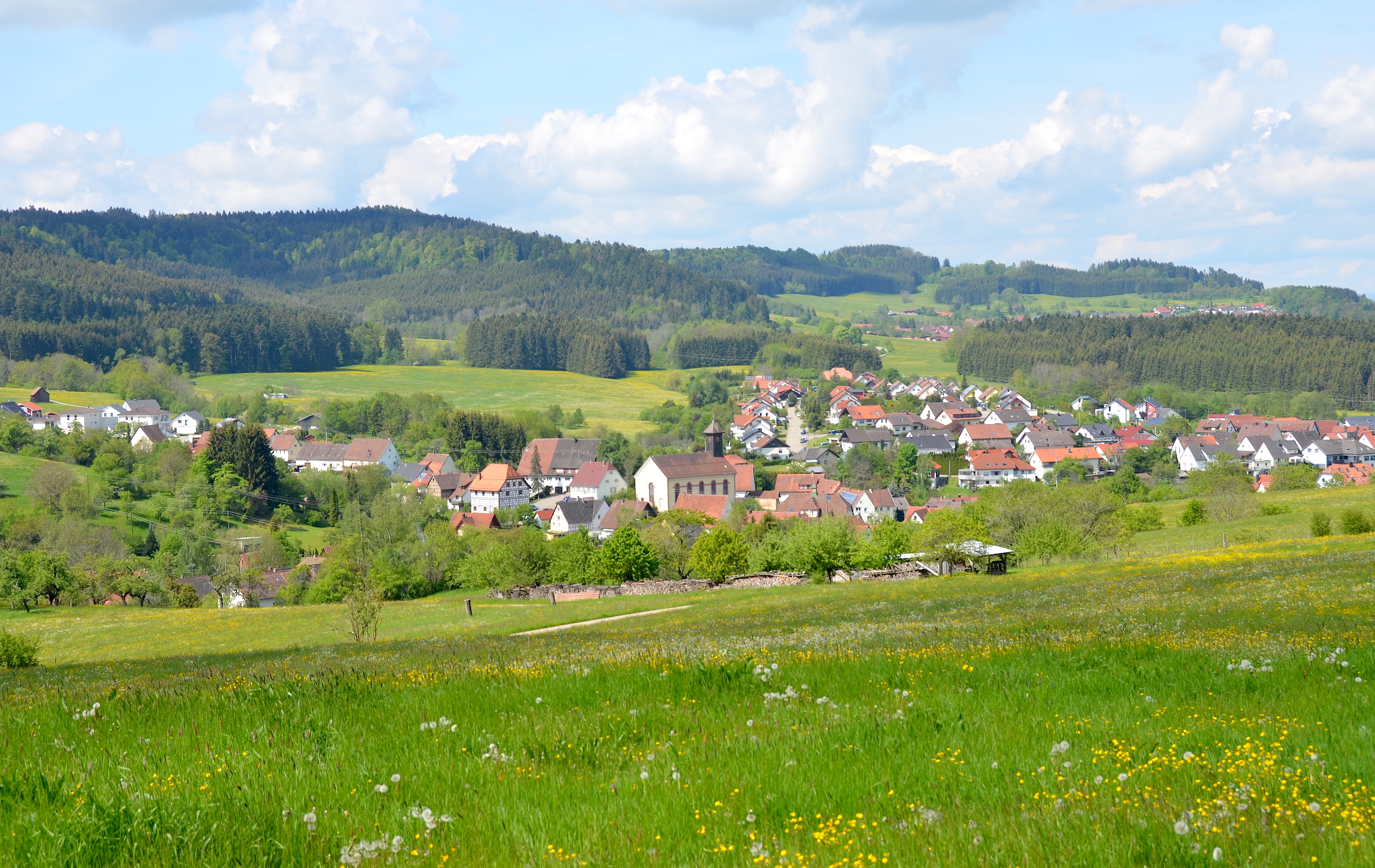
- Ratshausen, view towards south

- Coat of arms

- Location of Ratshausen within Zollernalbkreis district
- Interactive map of Ratshausen
- Location within Germany Location within Baden-Württemberg
- Coordinates: 48°11′36″N 08°47′43″E
- Country: Germany
- State: Baden-Württemberg
- Admin. region: Tübingen
- District: Zollernalbkreis

Government
  - Mayor (2023–31): Tommy Geiger

Area
  - Total: 5.77 km^{2} (2.23 sq mi)
- Elevation: 675 m (2,215 ft)

Population (2025-12-31)
  - Total: 778
  - Density: 135/km^{2} (349/sq mi)
- Time zone: UTC+01:00 (CET)
  - Summer (DST): UTC+02:00 (CEST)
- Postal codes: 72365
- Dialling codes: 07427
- Vehicle registration: BL
- Website: www.ratshausen.com

Ratshausen is a municipality the Zollernalbkreis district, in Baden-Württemberg, Germany.

== History ==
In 1805, Ratshausen, previously a possession of the Austrian County of Hohenberg, was annexed by the Kingdom of Württemberg. Ratshausen was assigned to Oberamt Spaichingen, and remained in that district until it was dissolved into Landkreis Balingen in 1938. The town transformed after World War II from a rural and agricultural town to a commercial center. Residential space was added to the southwest in the 1950s. As part of the 1973 Baden-Württemberg district reform, the district of Balingen was dissolved and Ratshausen reassigned to the newly created district of Zollernalb. Further development took place in the 1990s in the north and south.

== Geography ==
The municipality (Gemeinde) of Ratshausen is located in the Zollernalb district of Baden-Württemberg, one of the 16 states of the Federal Republic of Germany. It is located at the southwest end of the district and borders Tuttlingen district to the south. Ratshausen is physically located primarily in the High Swabian Jura, in the valley of the Schlichem, which flows through Ratshausen itself. Elevation above sea level in the municipal area ranges from a high of 995 meters (3,264 ft) Normalnull (NN) at the top of the Plettenberg to a low of 657 meters (2,156 ft) NN on the Schlichem.

A portion of the Federally-protected Ortenberg, Plettenkeller, and Tiefer Weg nature reserves is located in Ratshausen's municipal area.

== Coat of arms ==
Ratshausen's coat of arms depicts a white trowel upon a field of red. This pattern is derived from a seal used in the 19th century by the local Schultheiß that portrayed an oval shield with a wreath and a trowel upon it. The tool itself is a reference to the compulsory labor inhabitants of Ratshausen were expected to perform in the summer, usually the laying of bricks. The tincture, a reference to the County of Hohenberg, was decided by the provisional post-WWII Württemberg-Hohenzollern government that awarded this coat of arms to Ratshausen on 27 March 1950. A corresponding flag was issued by the Zollernalb district office on 21 May 1991.

== Transportation ==
Local public transportation is provided by the Verkehrsverbund Neckar-Alb-Donau.

== Notable people ==
- Michael Reitz, accused witch burned at the stake in 1580.
- Barbara Hengstallerin, accused witch burned at the stake in 1618.
