= Schafberg (Swabian Jura) =

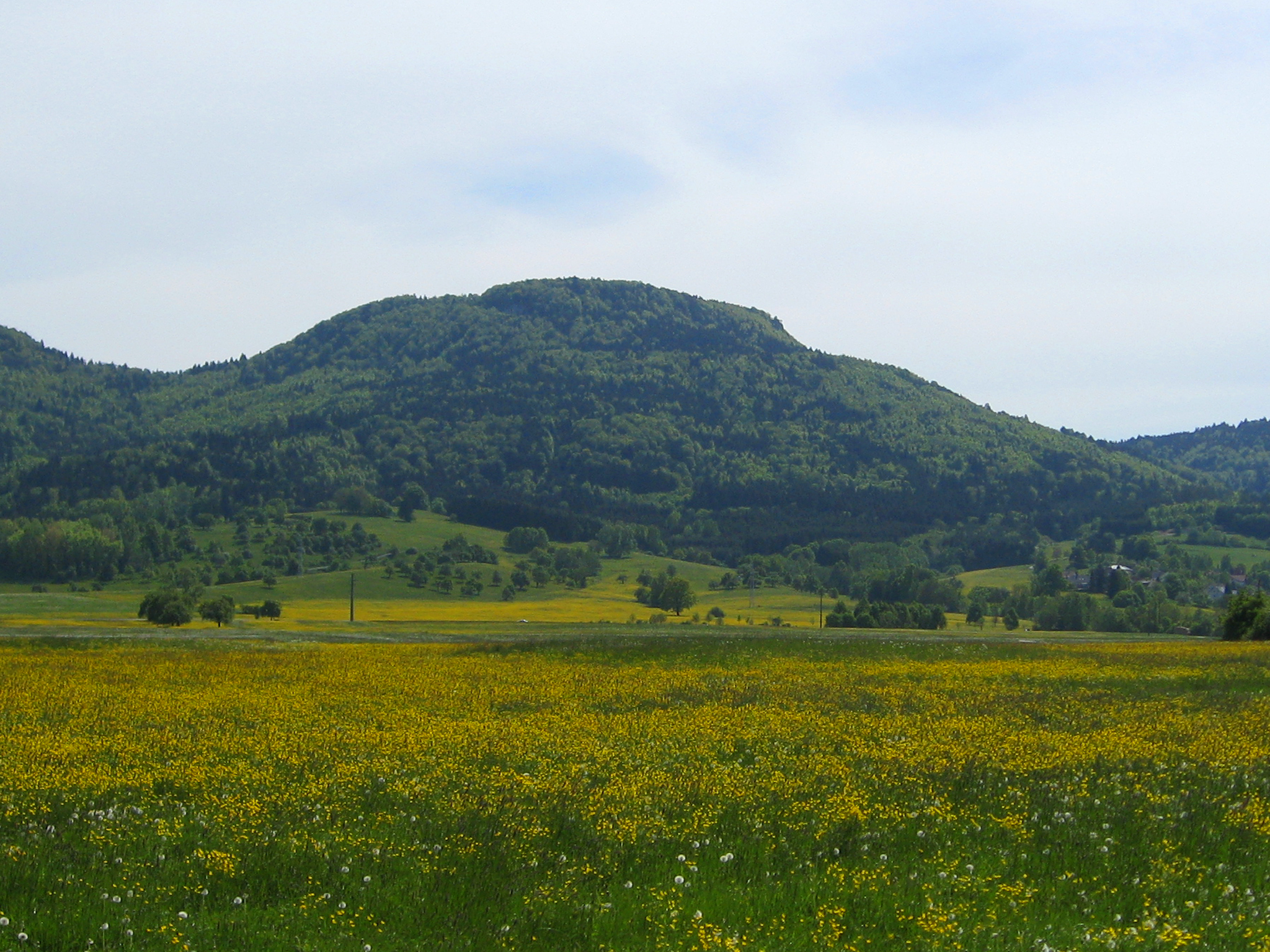
- The Schafberg seen from the northern Jura foreland

Highest point
- Elevation: 1,000 m above sea level (NHN) (3,300 ft)
- Coordinates: 48°12′39″N 8°50′00″E

Geography
- Location within Baden-Württemberg
- Location: Zollernalbkreis, Baden-Württemberg, Germany
- Parent range: Swabian Jura

Geology
- Mountain type: White Jurassic

The Schafberg is a mountain, 1,000.1 m above sea level (NHN), on the western edge of the Swabian Jura near Balingen in the German state of Baden-Württemberg.

It is part of the Balingen Mountains (Balinger Bergen) and is surrounded by the towns and villages of Roßwangen, Weilstetten (both in the borough of Balingen), Tieringen (borough of Meßstetten) and Hausen am Tann. Its neighbouring mountains are the Plettenberg (1,002 m) and the Lochenstein (963 m).

From the viewing points of Hoher Fels (996.5 m) and Gespaltener Fels (1,000.1 m) there are very good views of the surrounding area. Walks link the Balingen Mountains and the North Swabian Jura Way (Schwäbische-Alb-Nordrand-Weg) runs over the Schafberg. The Schafberg lies within the Upper Danube Nature Park.

== Gallery ==
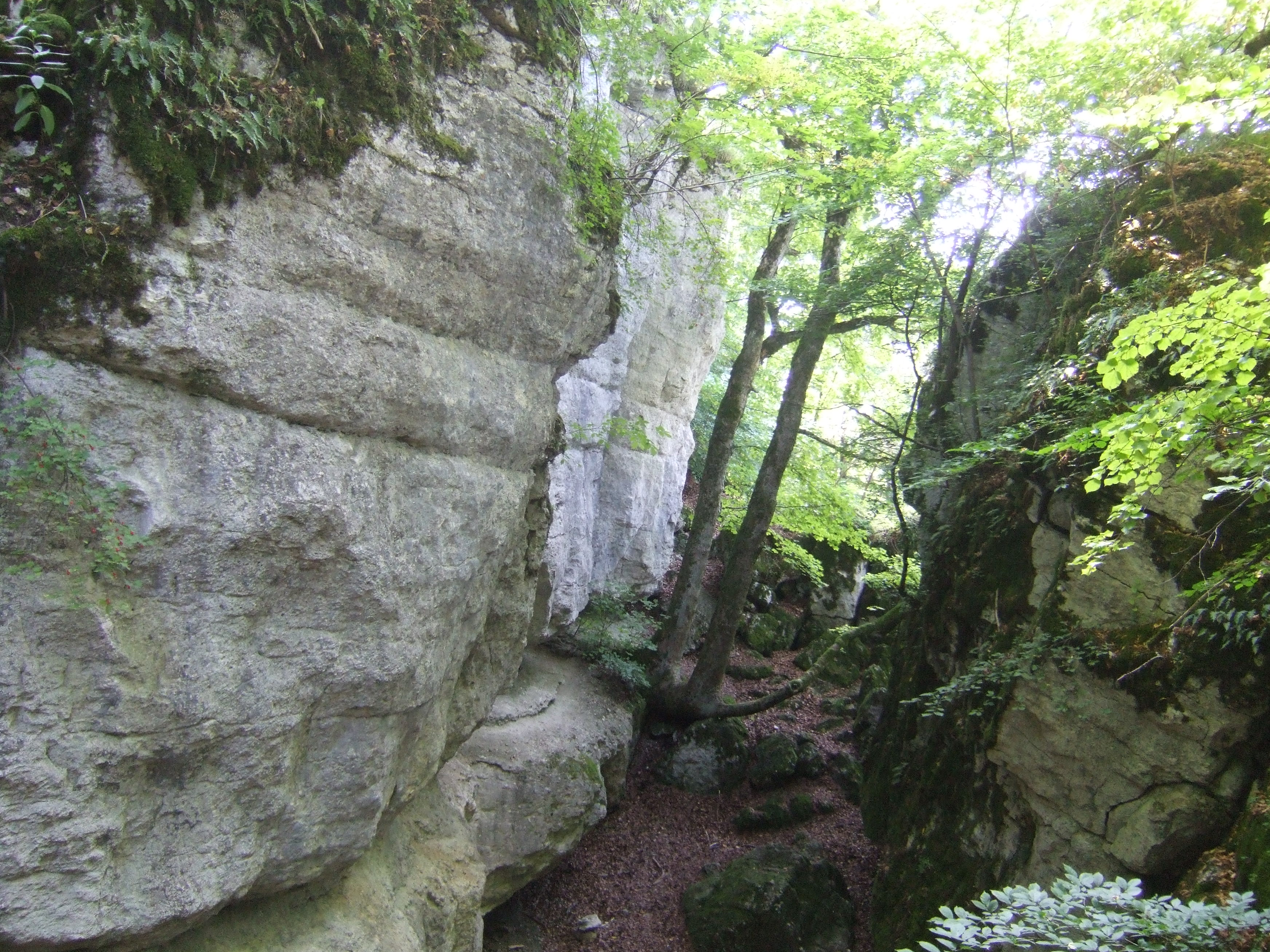
The Gespaltener Fels on the Schafberg

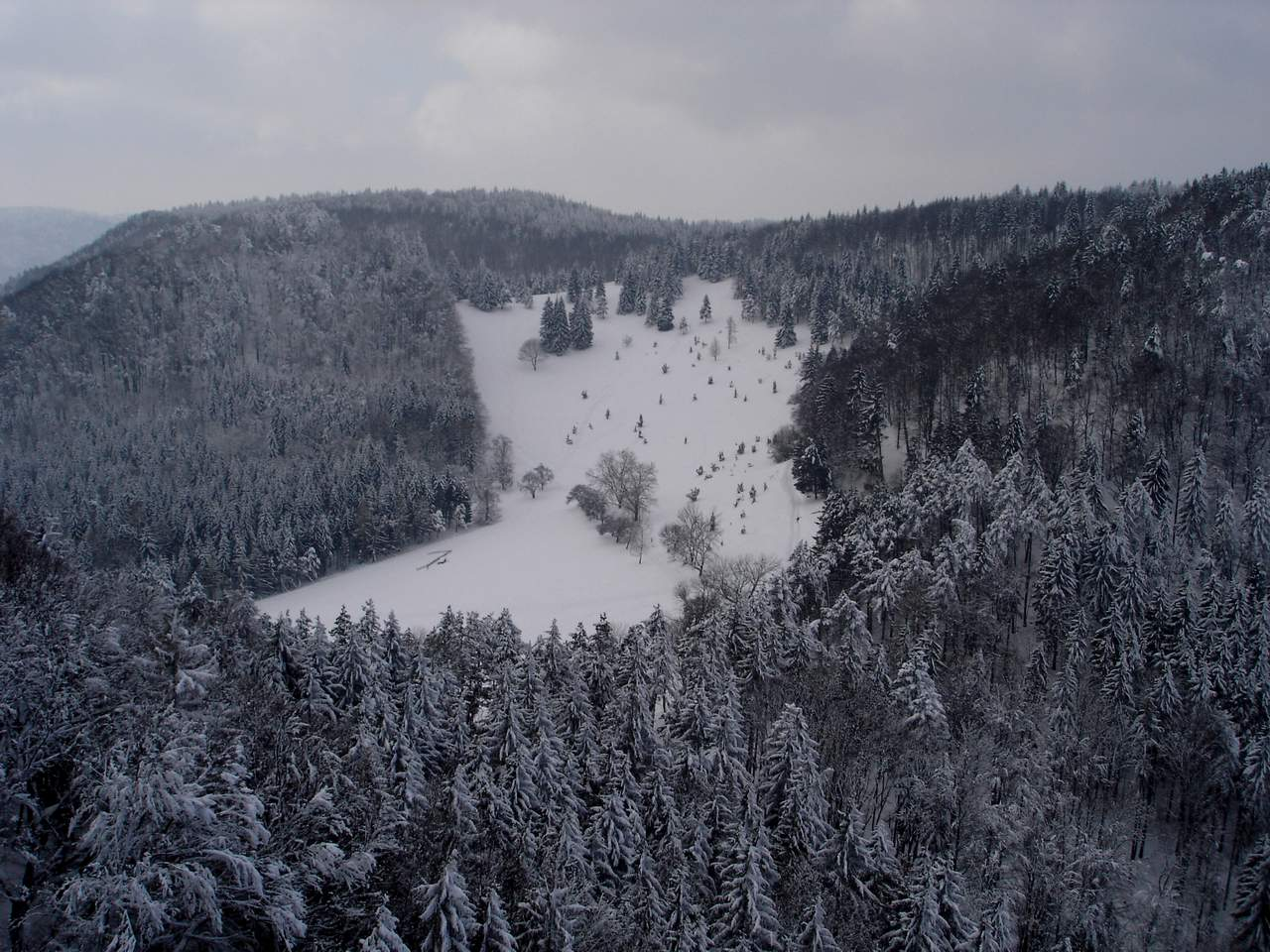
The southern part of the Schafberg seen from the Lochenstein
