= Volker Ordowski =

German road bicycle racer

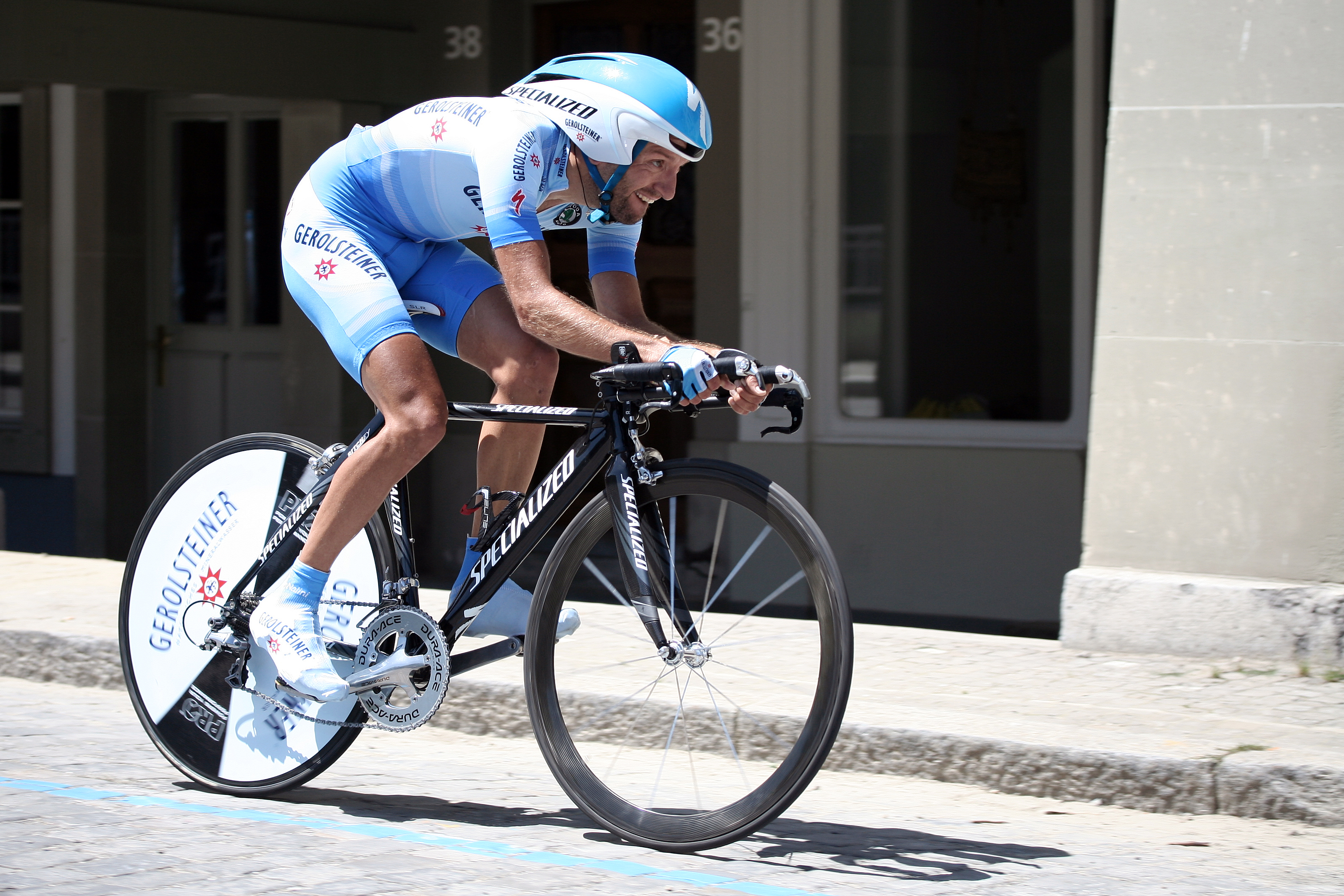

Personal information
- Full name: Volker Ordowski
- Born: 11 September 1973 (age 53) Weilen unter den Rinnen, Germany
- Height: 1.70 m (5 ft 7 in)
- Weight: 59 kg (130 lb)

Cycling career
- Sport: Cycling
- Current team: Retired
- Discipline: Road
- Role: Rider

Professional teams
- 1997: Schauff Öschelbronn
- 1998: Agro–Adler Brandenburg
- 1999–2008: Gerolsteiner

Volker Ordowski (born 11 September 1973 in Weilen unter den Rinnen) is a German former professional road bicycle racer, retiring after riding for UCI ProTeam Gerolsteiner for ten seasons.

== Major results ==
1995
2nd Overall Bayern Rundfahrt
1997
5th Overall Tour of Sweden

1st Stage 3

2000
9th Overall Regio-Tour
2004
3rd Kuurne–Brussels–Kuurne
2005
9th Overall Niedersachsen-Rundfahrt
2007
4th Memorial Rik Van Steenbergen
