= Dormettingen =

German municipality

- Municipality
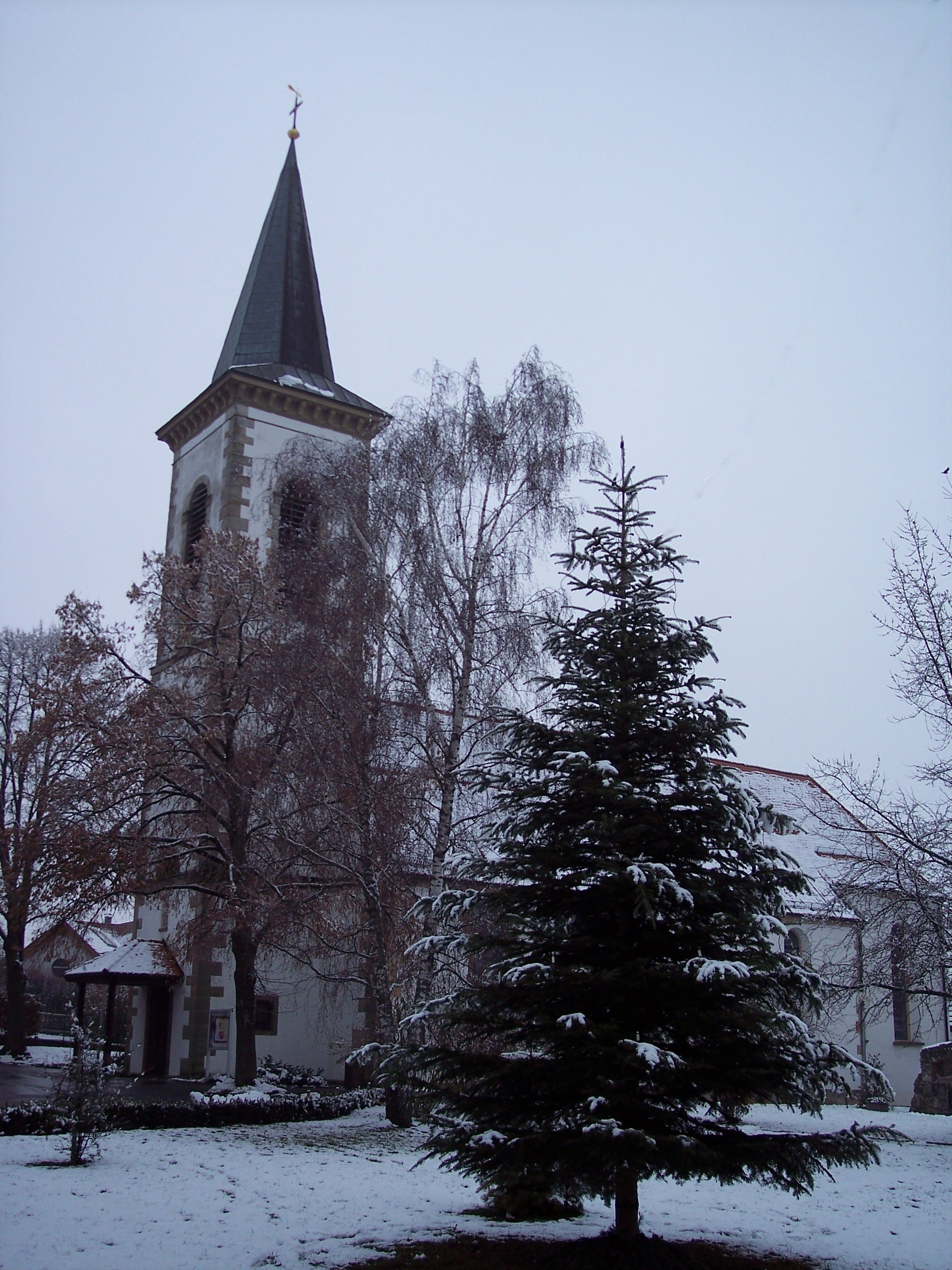
- St. Matthew's Church, Dormettingen

- Coat of arms

- Location of Dormettingen within Zollernalbkreis district
- Interactive map of Dormettingen
- Location within Germany Location within Baden-Württemberg
- Coordinates: 48°14′20″N 08°46′29″E
- Country: Germany
- State: Baden-Württemberg
- Admin. region: Tübingen
- District: Zollernalbkreis

Government
  - Mayor (2017–25): Anton Müller

Area
  - Total: 6.55 km^{2} (2.53 sq mi)
- Elevation: 644 m (2,113 ft)

Population (2025-12-31)
  - Total: 1,082
  - Density: 165/km^{2} (428/sq mi)
- Time zone: UTC+01:00 (CET)
  - Summer (DST): UTC+02:00 (CEST)
- Postal codes: 72358
- Dialling codes: 07427
- Vehicle registration: BL
- Website: www.dormettingen.de

Dormettingen is a town in the Zollernalbkreis district of Baden-Württemberg, Germany.

== History ==
In 1805, Dormettingen, previously a possession of the County of Hohenberg and of Austria, became part of the Kingdom of Württemberg. It was assigned in 1810 to Oberamt Spaichingen but in 1842 was reassigned to Oberamt Rottweil. When this district was dissolved in 1938, Dormettingen was assigned to Landkreis Balingen. Dormettingen doubled in size after World War II thanks to growth periods from the 1960s to the 1990s. As part of the 1973 Baden-Württemberg district reform, Landkreis Balingen was dissolved, and Dormettingen was assigned to the newly created district of Zollernalb.

== Geography ==
The municipality (Gemeinde) of Dormettingen covers 6.55 square kilometers (2.53 sq mi) of the Zollernalb district of Baden-Württemberg, one of the Federal Republic of Germany's 16 States. It is physically located on the Little Heuberg, a plateau above the Schlichem where oil shale can be found in the upper Liassic layers. The village of Dormettingen itself is found in a shallow trough, where it originated as a Haufendorf. Elevation above sea level in the municipal area varies from a low of 580 meters (1,900 ft) Normalnull (NN) to a high of 1,001 meters (3,284 ft) NN.

The Federally-protected Riedbach valley nature reserve is located inside Dormettingen's municipal area.

== Coat of arms ==
Dormettingen's coat of arms shows two white rake upon a field of red. The pattern is derived from a 19th-century seal from the Schultheiß's office that also had a plowshare below the rakes. These items symbolize Dormettingen's agricultural history while its red-white tincture reference bot the County of Hohenberg and Austria. That tincture, and the exclusion of the plowshare, were decided when the Federal Ministry of the Interior first awarded a coat of arms to Dormettingen on 16 May 1950. A corresponding flag was issued by the Zollernalb district office on 23 August 1982.

== Transportation ==
Dormettingen is connected to Germany's network of railways by the Balingen–Rottweil line, which has a station in Dormettingen itself. Local public transportation is provided by the Verkehrsverbund Neckar-Alb-Donau.
