= Weilen unter den Rinnen =

German municipality

- Municipality
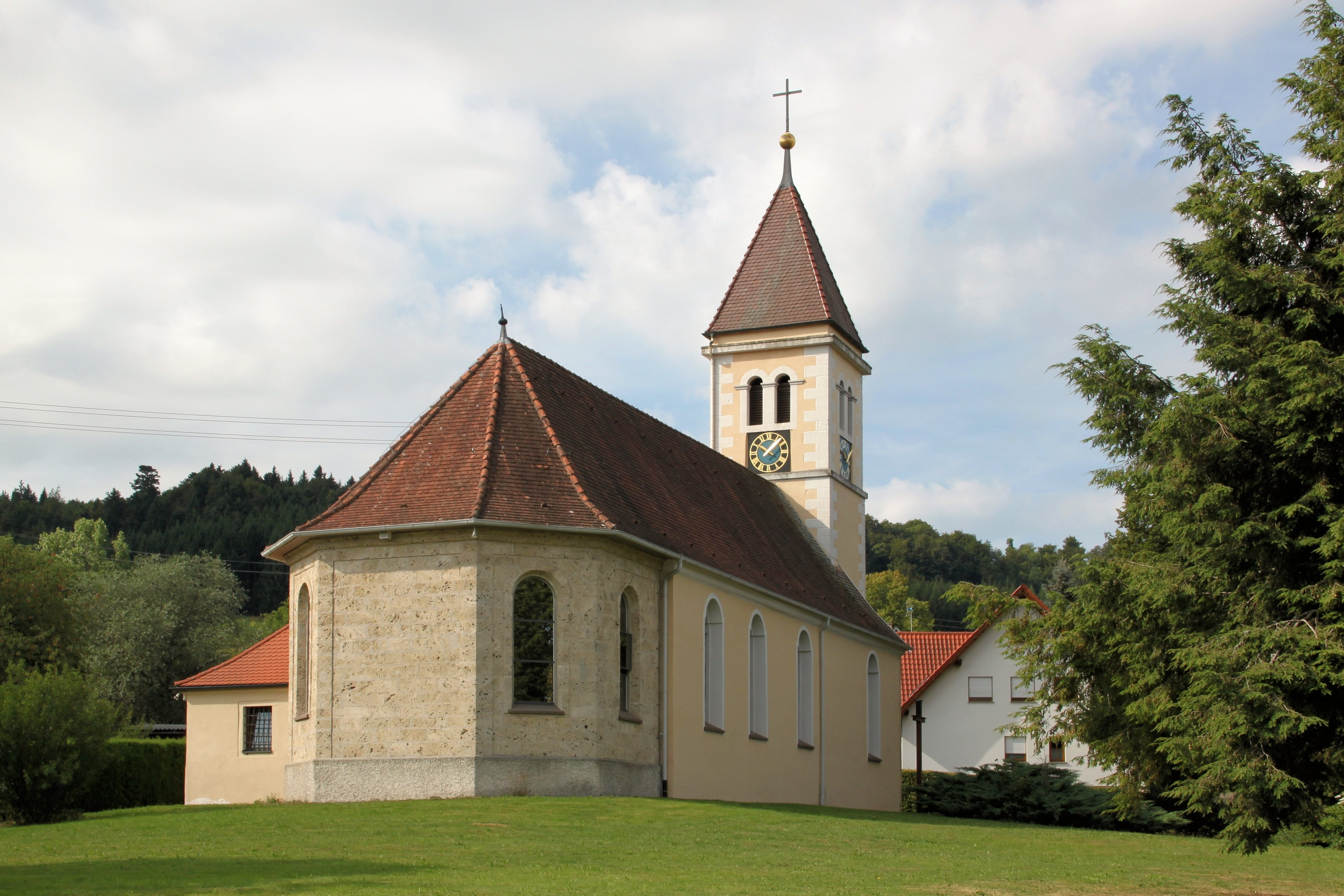
- Saint Nicholas's Church

- Coat of arms

- Location of Weilen unter den Rinnen within Zollernalbkreis district
- Interactive map of Weilen unter den Rinnen
- Location within Germany Location within Baden-Württemberg
- Coordinates: 48°11′22″N 08°45′53″E
- Country: Germany
- State: Baden-Württemberg
- Admin. region: Tübingen
- District: Zollernalbkreis

Government
  - Mayor (2023–31): Silke Edele

Area
  - Total: 3.08 km^{2} (1.19 sq mi)
- Elevation: 707 m (2,320 ft)

Population (2025-12-31)
  - Total: 561
  - Density: 182/km^{2} (472/sq mi)
- Time zone: UTC+01:00 (CET)
  - Summer (DST): UTC+02:00 (CEST)
- Postal codes: 72367
- Dialling codes: 07427
- Vehicle registration: BL
- Website: www.weilen-udr.de

Weilen unter den Rinnen (Weilen) is a municipality in the Zollernalbkreis district, in Baden-Württemberg, Germany.

== History ==
Weilen unter den Rinnen was ruled by Austria from 1381 to 1805, when it was ceded in the process of German mediatization to the Kingdom of Württemberg. Weilen was assigned by Stuttgart to Oberamt Spaichingen, with which it remained until that district's dissolution in 1938. Following that, Weilen was assigned to Landkreis Balingen. After World War II, Weilen developed into a commuter town, beginning in the 1950s with new residential space at the town's northern and southwestern extremities. In the 1973 Baden-Württemberg district reform, the district of Balingen was merged with others into a new district, Zollernalbkreis. Weilen continued to grow through the 1980s and 1990s.

== Geography ==
The municipality (Gemeinde) of Weilen unter den Rinnen is part of the Zollernalb district of Baden-Württemberg, a state of the Federal Republic of Germany. It lies on the southwest edge of the district, along the border with Tuttlingen district. Weilen is physically located in the foothills of the Swabian Jura, on the albtrauf near the Ortenberg above the Schlichem. Elevation above sea level in the municipal area ranges from a high of 872 meters (2,861 ft) Normalnull (NN) to the southeast, in the High Swabian Jura, to a low of 672 meters (2,205 ft) NN on the Schlichem to the northeast.

== Coat of arms ==
Weilen's coat of arms shows a field of red crossed by a white bar containing, in red, the letters "V" and "R", separated by a six-pointed star. The pattern is taken from the seal of the local Schultheiß, itself drawn from the Austrian blazon. The tincture is also a reference to Austria, and the letters "V" and "R" to the name, rendered in an old spelling as "W" and "R". A municipal flag was issued on 4 July 1983.

== Transportation ==
Local public transportation is provided by the Verkehrsverbund Neckar-Alb-Donau.
