= Tierberg (Swabian Jura) =

Mountain in Baden-Württemberg, Germany

Coordinates: 48°12′06″N 08°56′42″E

Highest point
- Elevation: 982 m (3,222 ft)

Geography
- Location: Zollernalbkreis, Baden-Württemberg, Germany

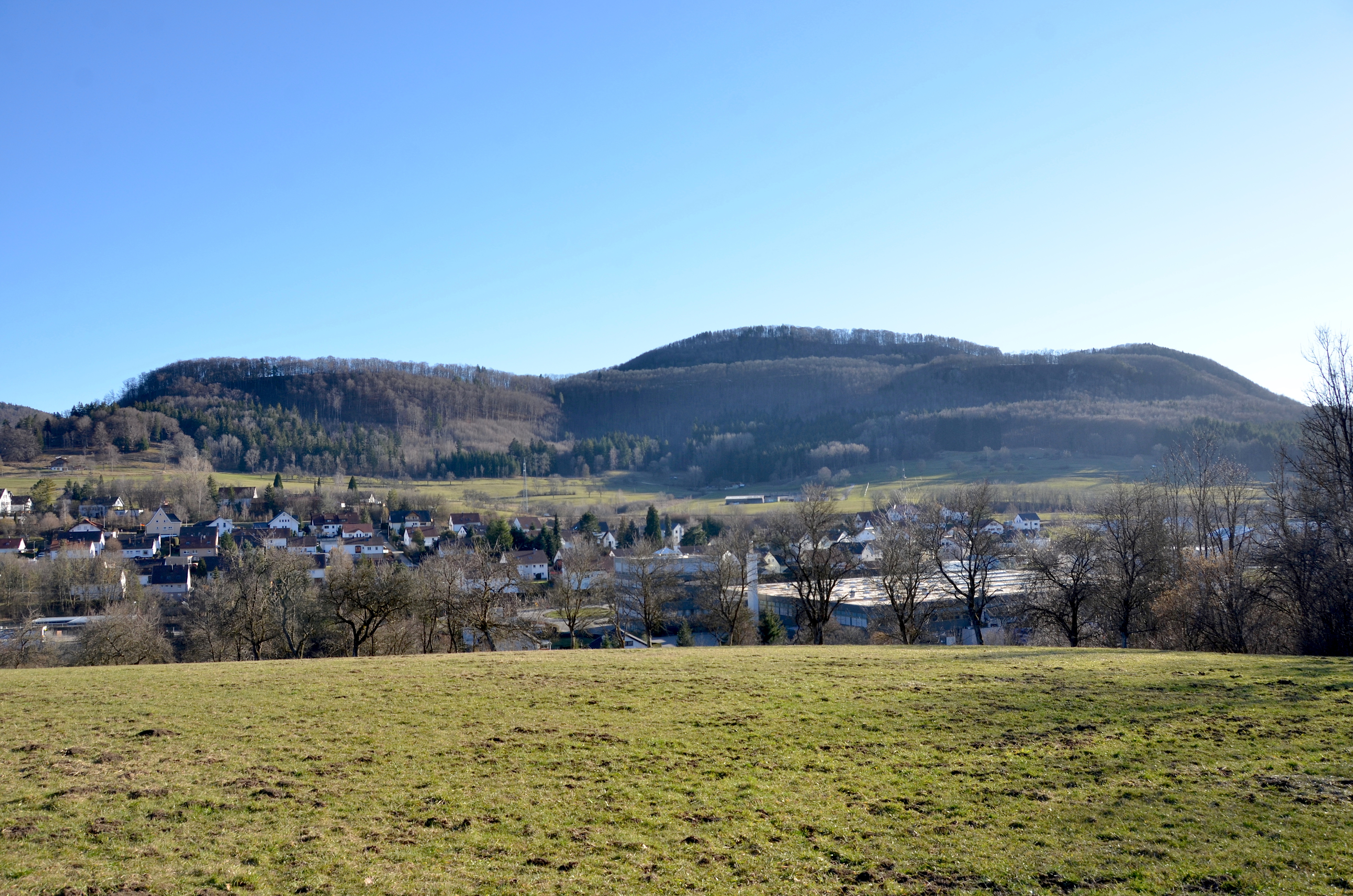
Tierberg

The Tierberg is a mountain in the Swabian Jura in the German state of Baden-Württemberg. It is located in Zollernalbkreis.
