= Grosselfingen =

German municipality

- Municipality
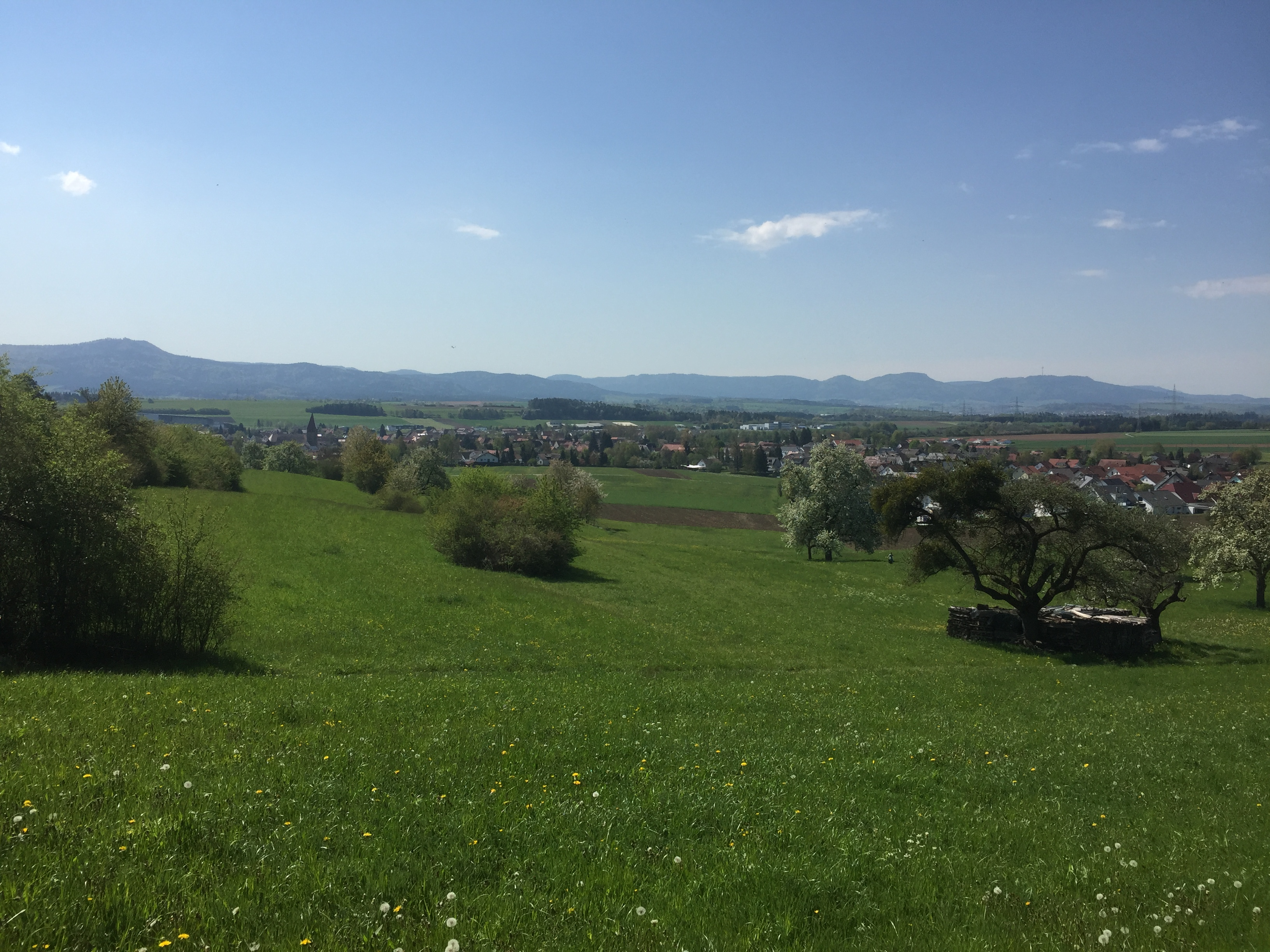
- Grosselfingen from the north

- Coat of arms

- Location of Grosselfingen within Zollernalbkreis district
- Interactive map of Grosselfingen
- Location within Germany Location within Baden-Württemberg
- Coordinates: 48°19′57″N 08°53′12″E
- Country: Germany
- State: Baden-Württemberg
- Admin. region: Tübingen
- District: Zollernalbkreis

Area
  - Total: 16.15 km^{2} (6.24 sq mi)
- Elevation: 520 m (1,710 ft)

Population (2025-12-31)
  - Total: 2,208
  - Density: 136.7/km^{2} (354.1/sq mi)
- Time zone: UTC+01:00 (CET)
  - Summer (DST): UTC+02:00 (CEST)
- Postal codes: 72415
- Dialling codes: 07476
- Vehicle registration: BL
- Website: www.grosselfingen.de

Grosselfingen is a town in the Zollernalbkreis district, in Baden-Württemberg, Germany.

== History ==
In the first half of the 14th century, the village of Grosselfingen was a possession of the Lordship of Haimburg, a fief of the County of Hohenberg and then the County of Zollern. The Lordship, and by extension the village, was from 1428 to 1522 ruled by the House of Bubenhofen. In 1850, the Zollern was taken over by the Kingdom of Prussia, whose government assigned Grosselfingen to Oberamt Hechingen, reorganized in 1925 as Landkreis Hechingen. Grosselfingen, which was agrarian before World War II, industrialized after the war. Beginning in 1950, it grew to the north-west and south-east. The district of Balingen was dissolved by the 1973 Baden-Württemberg district reform and Grosselfingen was assigned to a new district, Zollernalbkreis. Continued growth in the 1980s and 1990s spread Grosselfingen further south.

== Geography ==
The municipality (Gemeinde) of Grosselfingen covers 16.15 square kilometers (6.24 sq mi) of the Zollernalb district of Baden-Württemberg, one of the 16 States of the Federal Republic of Germany. It is physically located between the rivers Starzel and Eyach, in the foothills of the Swabian Jura. Elevation above sea level in the municipal area ranges from a high of 624 meters (2,047 ft) Normalnull (NN) on the Owinger Berg to a low of 460 meters (1,510 ft).

== Coat of arms ==
Grosselfingen's municipal coat of arms is divided party per cross into four pieces, two black and two white. This pattern is the coat of arms of the County of Zollern, but imposed on it are symbols in the white quarters. In the upper left quarter are two zig-zag red lines, from the coat of arms of the House of Bubenhofen. In the lower right is a blue bird seated on a blue nest. Called the "summer bird" (Sommervogel), this is a reference to the Honourable Court of Fools of Grosselfingen (ehrsame Narrengericht zu Grosselfingen), a local Fastnacht tradition that traces its origin to the rule of the Bubenhofens. The coat of arms was approved by the provisional Württemberg-Hohenzollern government on 13 January 1949. A corresponding flag was issued by the Zollernalb district office on 30 June 1982.

== Transportation ==
Public transportation in Grosselfingen is provided by the Verkehrsverbund Neckar-Alb-Donau.
