= Schömberg, Zollernalbkreis =

German town

Schömberg
- Town
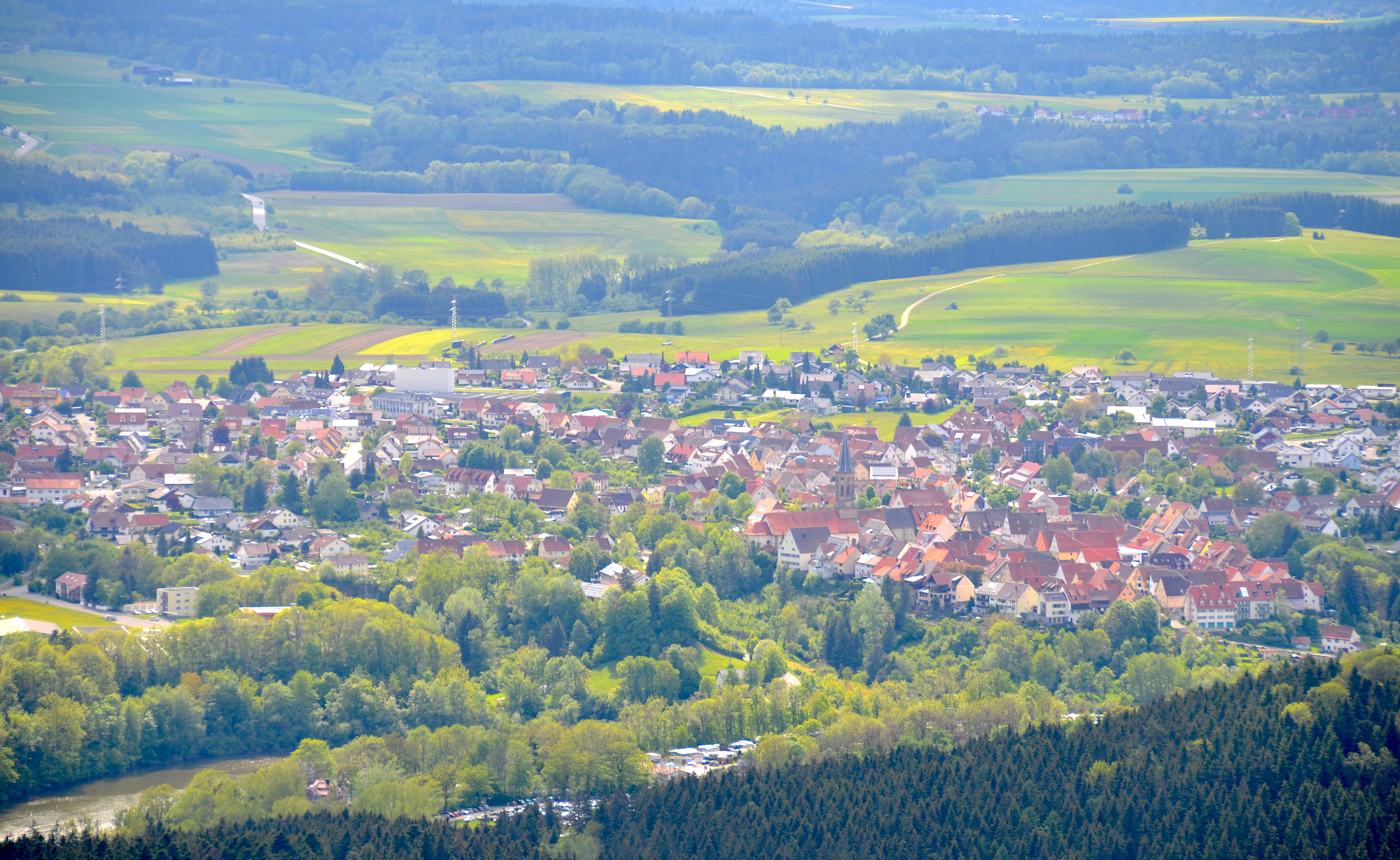
- Schömberg

- Coat of arms

- Location of Schömberg within Zollernalbkreis district
- Interactive map of Schömberg
- Location within Germany Location within Baden-Württemberg
- Coordinates: 48°12′41″N 08°45′42″E
- Country: Germany
- State: Baden-Württemberg
- Admin. region: Tübingen
- District: Zollernalbkreis
- Subdivisions: 2 Stadtteile

Area
  - Total: 23.25 km^{2} (8.98 sq mi)
- Elevation: 676 m (2,218 ft)

Population (2025-12-31)
  - Total: 4,790
  - Density: 206/km^{2} (534/sq mi)
- Time zone: UTC+01:00 (CET)
  - Summer (DST): UTC+02:00 (CEST)
- Postal codes: 72352–72355
- Dialling codes: 07427
- Vehicle registration: BL
- Website: www.stadt-schoemberg.de

Schömberg (German pronunciation: [ˈʃøːmbɛʁk]) is a town in the Zollernalbkreis district of Baden-Württemberg, Germany.

== History ==
Until 1805, the towns of Schömberg and Schörzingen were in possession of the County of Hohenberg. As part of the process of German mediatization, the two towns were awarded to the Kingdom of Württemberg, whose government assigned them in 1810 to Oberamt Rottweil. The towns were reassigned to Landkreis Balingen in 1938. In the 1950s and 1960s, Schömberg enjoyed a period of growth to the south, east, and west. The 1973 Baden-Württemberg district reform merged the district of Balingen into the newly created Zollernalb district in January. The next month, on 1 February, Schömberg and Schörzingen merged into a single municipality. There was further urban growth in the 1980s, when a gap between some industrial parks to the south was closed with the construction of additional commercial zones.

== Geography ==
The township (Stadt) of Schömberg is located in Zollernalbkreis, a district of the German state of Baden-Württemberg. It is physically located in the foothills of the Swabian Jura, specifically in the Upper Swabian Jura. The main watercourse in the municipal area is the Schlichem, whose deeply-cut valley forms part of the northern municipal border. The Schlichem is also the location of the lowest elevation above sea level in Schömberg at 640 meters (2,100 ft) Normalnull (NN). The highest elevation, 998 meters (3,274 ft) NN, is found at the top of the Plettenberg, in the east.

The Federally-protected Plettenkeller and Schwarzenbach nature reserves are partially located within Schömberg's municipal area.

== Demographics ==
View chart definition.

== Coat of arms ==
Schömberg's municipal coat of arms is divided party per fess into two halves, the bottom red and the top white. Inside the white field is a black stag's antler. The pattern refers in to firstly the County of Hohenberg, whose white-red coat of arms appeared on municipal seal as early as 1278, and to Württemberg, whose own coat of arms prominently features stag horns. The addition of the stag horn also distinguished Schömberg's arms from those of other former Hohenberger towns (Haigerloch, Horb am Neckar, and Rottenburg am Neckar). This pattern was in use by Schömberg before the 1973 merger with Schörzingen and was reapproved by the Zollernalb district office on 1 October 1976.

== Transportation ==
=== Railway ===
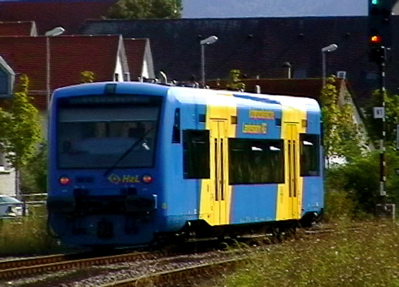
Radwander-Shuttle of the HzL Schömberg -Balingen

On the Tübingen–Sigmaringen railway and the Balingen–Rottweil railway, a tourism Train of the SWEG Südwestdeutsche Landesverkehrs-AG . The railway was reactivated for excursion trips of the Rad-Wander(Bike Hiking)-Shuttle, running from May to October, supporting cycling tourism to Schömberg Stausee(Schömberger Reservoir). Bathing, sunbathing, eating, going for a walk, boating and relaxing - these are just a few of the many things you can spend a good time with at the Schömberger Reservoir.

== Notable people ==
- Margareta Weißbrot, accused witch burned at the stake in 1554.
- Anna Klarer, accused witch burned at the stake in 1607.
