= Zimmern unter der Burg =

German municipality

- Municipality
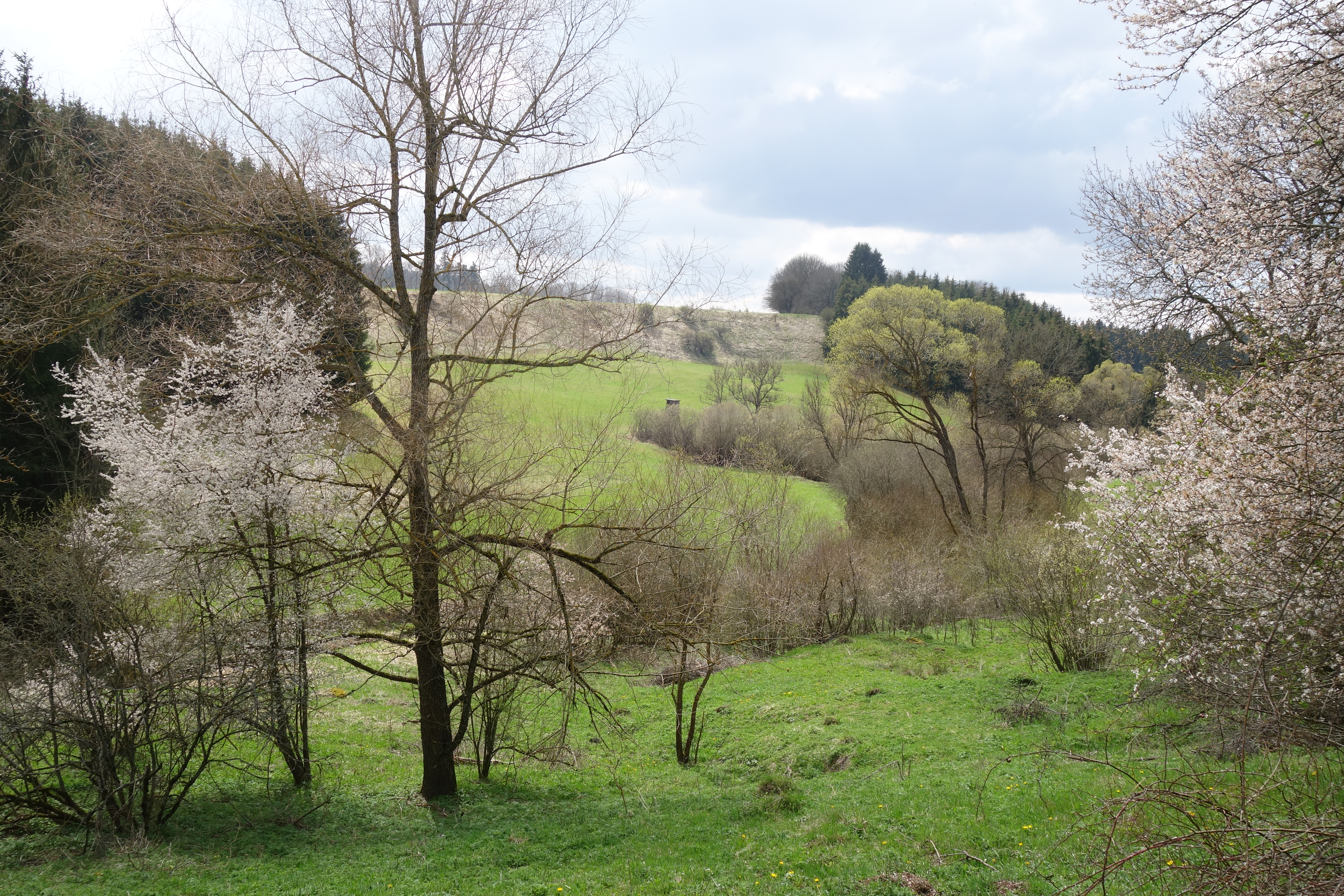
- Schwarzenbach nature reserve

- Coat of arms

- Location of Zimmern unter der Burg within Zollernalbkreis district
- Interactive map of Zimmern unter der Burg
- Location within Germany Location within Baden-Württemberg
- Coordinates: 48°13′14″N 08°43′06″E
- Country: Germany
- State: Baden-Württemberg
- Admin. region: Tübingen
- District: Zollernalbkreis

Government
  - Mayor (2023–31): Walter Sieber

Area
  - Total: 5.05 km^{2} (1.95 sq mi)
- Elevation: 600 m (2,000 ft)

Population (2025-12-31)
  - Total: 422
  - Density: 83.6/km^{2} (216/sq mi)
- Time zone: UTC+01:00 (CET)
  - Summer (DST): UTC+02:00 (CEST)
- Postal codes: 72369
- Dialling codes: 07427
- Vehicle registration: BL
- Website: zimmern-udb.de

Zimmern unter der Burg (lit. 'Zimmern below the Castle') is a municipality in the Zollernalbkreis district, in Baden-Württemberg, Germany.

== History ==
Before 1806, Zimmern unter der Burg was a possession of the County of Waldburg-Zeil, but after that date was mediatized to the Kingdom of Württemberg. Zimmern was assigned to Oberamt Spaichingen but was then reassigned in 1810 to Oberamt Rottweil. A patrimonial vogtei based in Balgheim was present in the township until 1833, when its rights expired and the manor was sold to the Oberamt. In 1938, the Rottweil Oberamt was dissolved and Zimmern was assigned to Landkreis Balingen. There was not much development in the municipality after World War II. Following the 1973 Baden-Württemberg district reform, the district of Balingen was merged into the new district of Zollernalb.

== Geography ==
The municipality (Gemeinde) of Zimmern unter der Burg is found at the southwestern edge of the Zollernalb district of Baden-Württemberg, a state of the Federal Republic of Germany. It lies along the border of the district of Rottweil. Zimmern is physically located on the western edge of the Swabian Jura, in the Upper Schlichem valley. The town of Zimmern unter der Burg itself lies on the confluence of three streams. Elevation above sea level in the municipal area ranges from a high of 705 meters (2,313 ft) Normalnull (NN) to a low of 574 meters (1,883 ft) NN.

A portion of the Federally-protected Schwarzenbach nature reserve is located in Zimmern's municipal area.

== Coat of arms ==
Zimmern's coat of arms is divided by a zig-zag line into two fields: an upper, white half and a lower, red half. This pattern was the arms of the County of Sulz, adopted by Zimmern for municipal use after World War II and approved for that function by the post-war provisional Württemberg-Hohenzollern government on 8 June 1949. An earlier pattern, of a castle upon a hill, had been put forward on 27 November 1933 with a tincture suggested by Central State Archive Stuttgart, but it was rejected. A corresponding municipal flag was issued by the Zollernalb district office on 29 March 1982.

== Transportation ==
Local public transportation is provided by the Verkehrsverbund Neckar-Alb-Donau.
