= Hausen am Tann =

Town in Baden-Württemberg, Germany

- Municipality
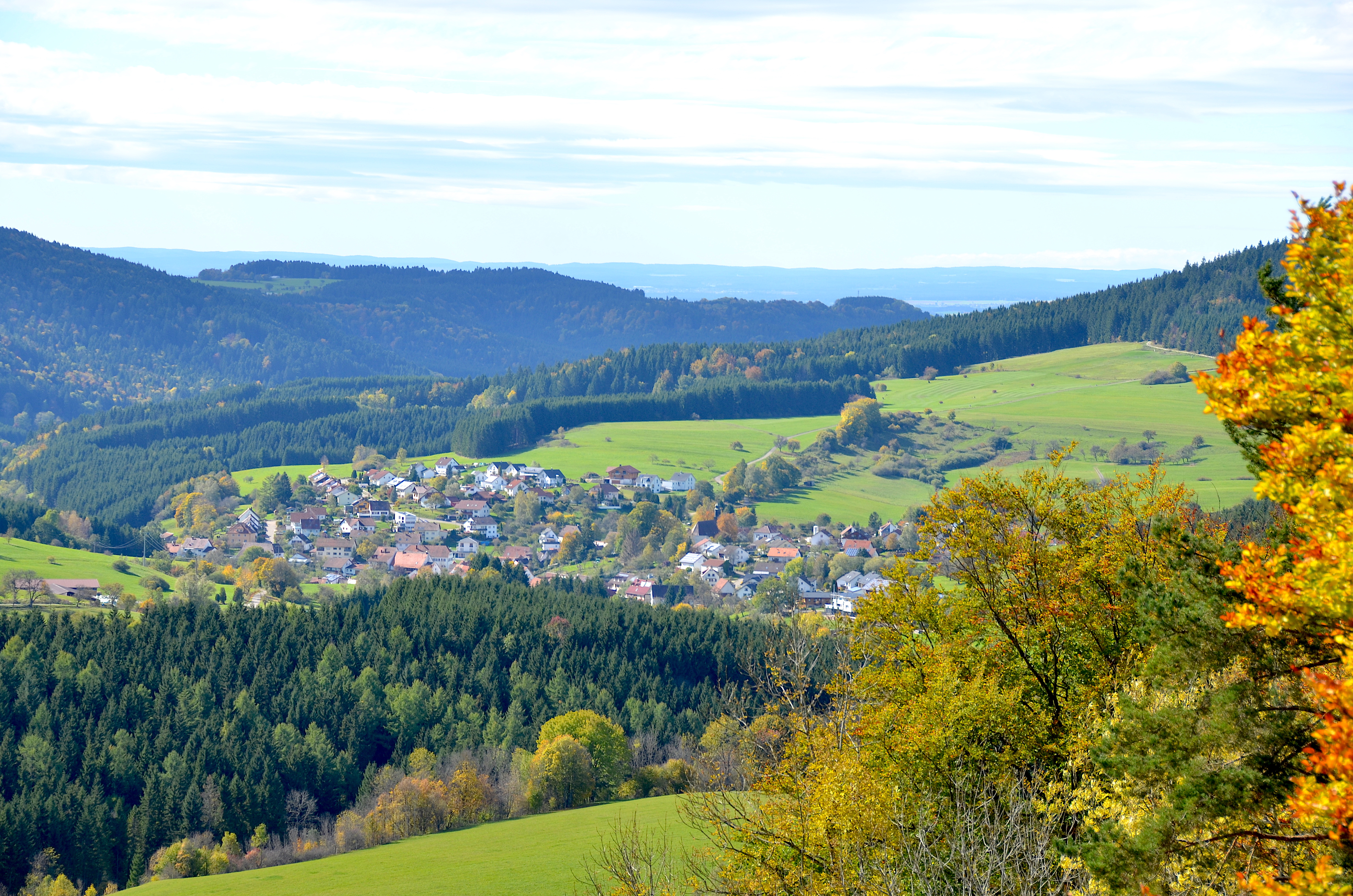
- Hausen am Tann from the east

- Coat of arms

- Location of Hausen am Tann within Zollernalbkreis district
- Interactive map of Hausen am Tann
- Location within Germany Location within Baden-Württemberg
- Coordinates: 48°11′54″N 08°50′12″E
- Country: Germany
- State: Baden-Württemberg
- Admin. region: Tübingen
- District: Zollernalbkreis

Area
  - Total: 8.49 km^{2} (3.28 sq mi)
- Elevation: 745 m (2,444 ft)

Population (2025-12-31)
  - Total: 504
  - Density: 59.4/km^{2} (154/sq mi)
- Time zone: UTC+01:00 (CET)
  - Summer (DST): UTC+02:00 (CEST)
- Postal codes: 72361
- Dialling codes: 07436
- Vehicle registration: BL
- Website: www.hausen-am-tann.de/hausen/

Hausen am Tann is a town in the Zollernalbkreis district of Baden-Württemberg, Germany.

== History ==
In 1805 Hausen am Tann, formerly a possession of Austria, became part of the Kingdom of Württemberg, whose government assigned it to Oberamt Balingen. In 1810, it was reassigned to Oberamt Spaichingen and in 1842 to Oberamt Rottweil. In 1938, that district was merged into the new Landkreis Balingen. There was modest development in Hausen after World War II in the 1950s. In 1973, as part of that year's reform of Baden-Württemberg's districts, Balingen's district and by extension Hausen were merged into a new district, Zollernalbkreis. There was some additional development to the north and southwest in the late 1990s.

== Geography ==
The municipality (Gemeinde) of Hausen am Tann covers 8.49 square kilometers (3.28 sq mi) of the Zollernalb district of Baden-Württemberg, a state of the Federal Republic of Germany. It is physically located in the western foothills of the Swabian Jura. Elevation above sea level in the municipality ranges from a high of 995 meters (3,264 ft) Normalnull (NN) at the top of the Schafberg to a low of 697 meters (2,287 ft) NN in the valley of the Schlichem.

A portion of the Federally-protected Schafberg-Lochenstein nature reserve is located inside Hausen's municipal area.

== Coat of arms ==
Hausen's coat of arms displays two white foothold trap jaws upon a field of blue. It was adapted from the arms of Dietrich Spät, who was lord of the village until his death in 1530. This pattern was awarded by the provisional Württemberg-Hohenzollern government on 13 February 1950. A flag was issued by the Zollernalb district office on 31 March 1982.

== Transportation ==
Hausen is only connected to Germany's roadways by the K7170. Local public transportation is provided by the Verkehrsverbund Neckar-Alb-Donau.
