= Bitz =

German municipality

- Municipality
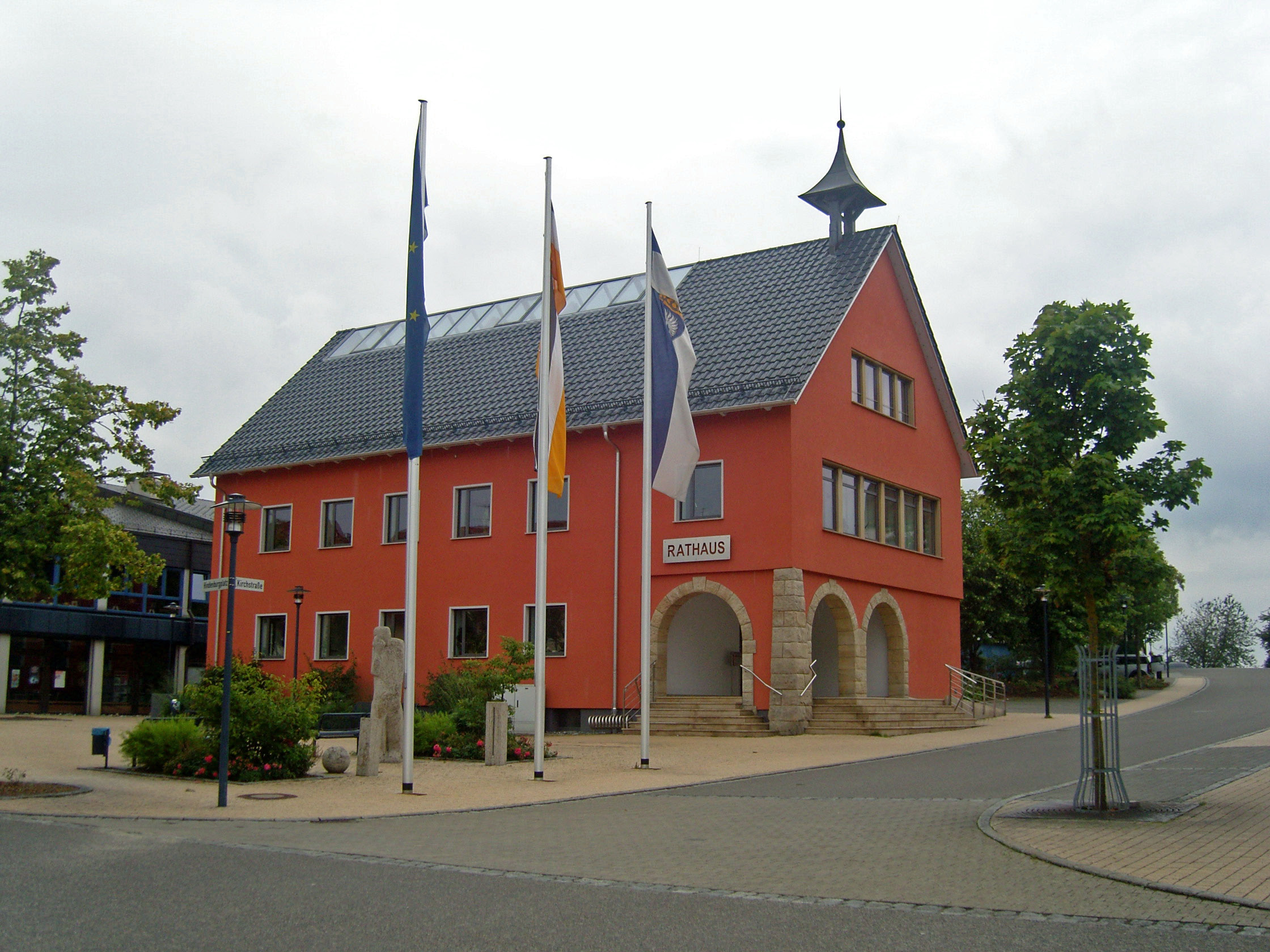
- Bitz town hall

- Coat of arms

- Location of Bitz within Zollernalbkreis district
- Interactive map of Bitz
- Location within Germany Location within Baden-Württemberg
- Coordinates: 48°14′38″N 09°05′27″E
- Country: Germany
- State: Baden-Württemberg
- Admin. region: Tübingen
- District: Zollernalbkreis

Government
  - Mayor (2024–32): Raphaela Gonser

Area
  - Total: 8.82 km^{2} (3.41 sq mi)
- Elevation: 884 m (2,900 ft)

Population (2025-12-31)
  - Total: 3,822
  - Density: 433/km^{2} (1,120/sq mi)
- Time zone: UTC+01:00 (CET)
  - Summer (DST): UTC+02:00 (CEST)
- Postal codes: 72475
- Dialling codes: 07431
- Vehicle registration: BL
- Website: www.bitz.de

Bitz (German pronunciation: [bɪts]) is a municipality in the Zollernalbkreis district of Baden-Württemberg, Germany.

== History ==
Bitz was a possession of the House of Lichtenstein until 1386. Bitz became an independent municipality within the Kingdom of Württemberg in 1832. It was assigned in 1806 to Oberamt Balingen, reorganized in 1938 as Landkreis Balingen. Bitz enjoyed large-scale industrial growth in the 1960s in every direction but south. In 1973, following Baden-Württemberg's district reforms in that year, Bitz was reassigned to the newly created Zollernalb district. Another period of expansion, this time residential, elapsed in the 1980s.

== Geography ==
The municipality (Gemeinde) of Bitz is politically located in the Zollernalb district of Baden-Württemberg, a state of the Federal Republic of Germany. Bitz is physically located in a depression of the Kuppenalb and Upper Swabian Jura. Elevation above sea level in the municipal area ranges from a low of 775 meters (2,543 ft) Normalnull (NN) to a high of 928 meters (3,045 ft) NN.

== Coat of arms ==
Bitz's municipal coat of arms displays a white eagle's wing on a field of blue below a chief of yellow containing a black stag's antler. This pattern was awarded to the municipality of by the Federal Ministry of the Interior on 17 April 1958. A flag was issued by the government of the provisional Württemberg-Hohenzollern on 8 May 1951. The first pattern was a seal from 1930 with two bobbins and two sewing needles. This was replaced on 14 March 1938 with a coat of arms displaying a silver loom with blue thread, which was approved by the local Reichsstatthalter, Wilhelm Murr. Both these patterns recalled Bitz's industrial history, but in 1958 the loom was replaced with the eagle wing to represent the House of Lichtenstein; the stag horn, references Württemberg.

== Transportation ==
Bitz is connected to the network of German roadways by the L448. The Albstadt-Degerfeld airfield is located about 2 kilometers (1.2 mi) northwest of Bitz. Local public transport is provided by the Verkehrsverbund Neckar-Alb-Donau.
