= Schlichem =

River in Germany

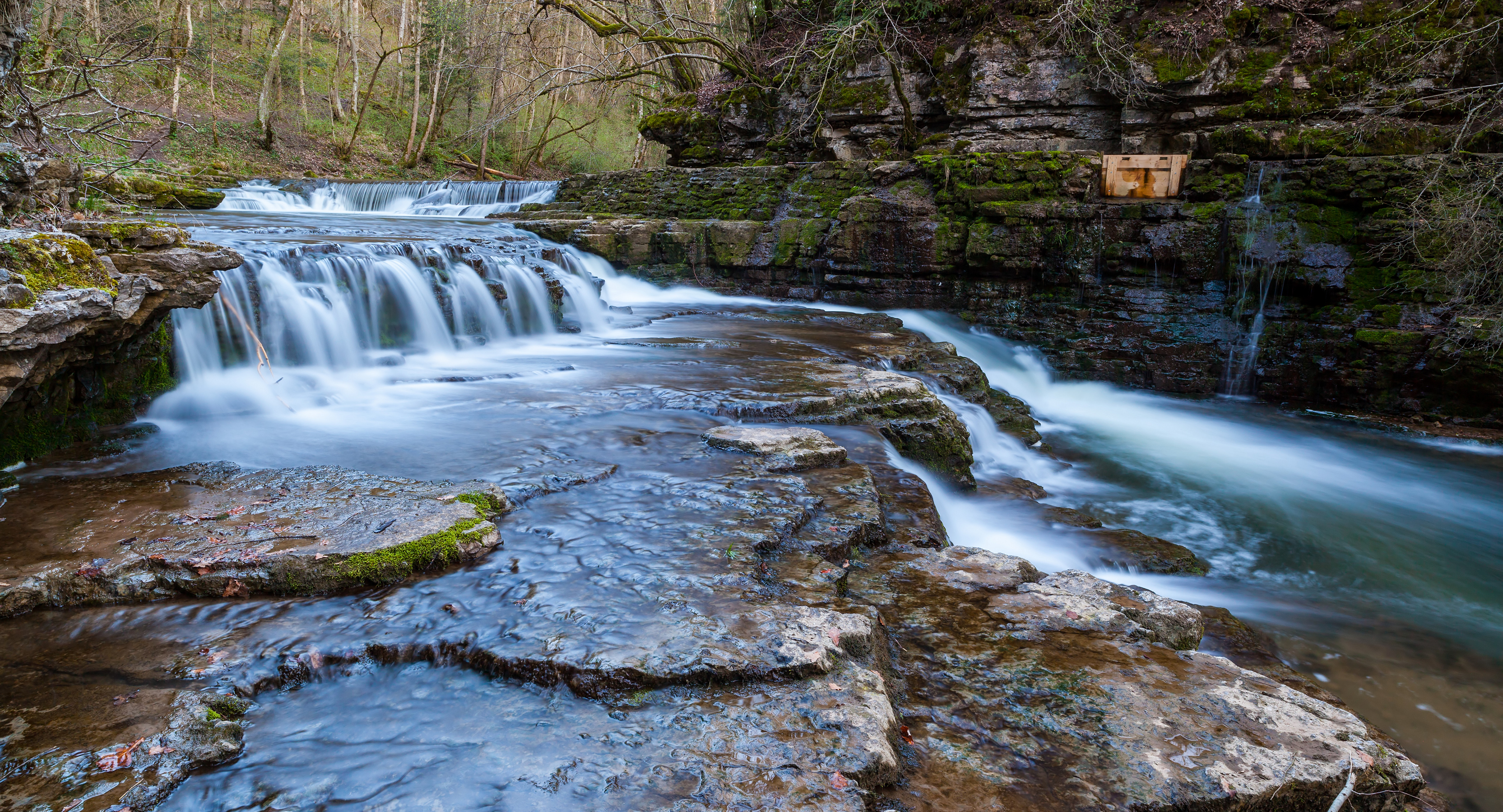
- Schlichem near Epfendorf

Location
- Country: Germany
- State: Baden-Württemberg

Physical characteristics
- Source
  - elevation: 885 m (2,904 ft)
- Mouth
  - location: Neckar
  - coordinates: 48.25°N 8.6°E
  - elevation: c. 484 m (1,588 ft)
- Length: 34.0 km (21.1 mi)
- Basin size: 108,845 km^{2} (42,025 sq mi)

Basin features
- Progression: Neckar→ Rhine→ North Sea

Schlichem is a river of Baden-Württemberg, Germany. It passes through Schömberg and flows, 33 km (21 mi) away, into the Neckar in Epfendorf.

== Geography ==
=== Course ===
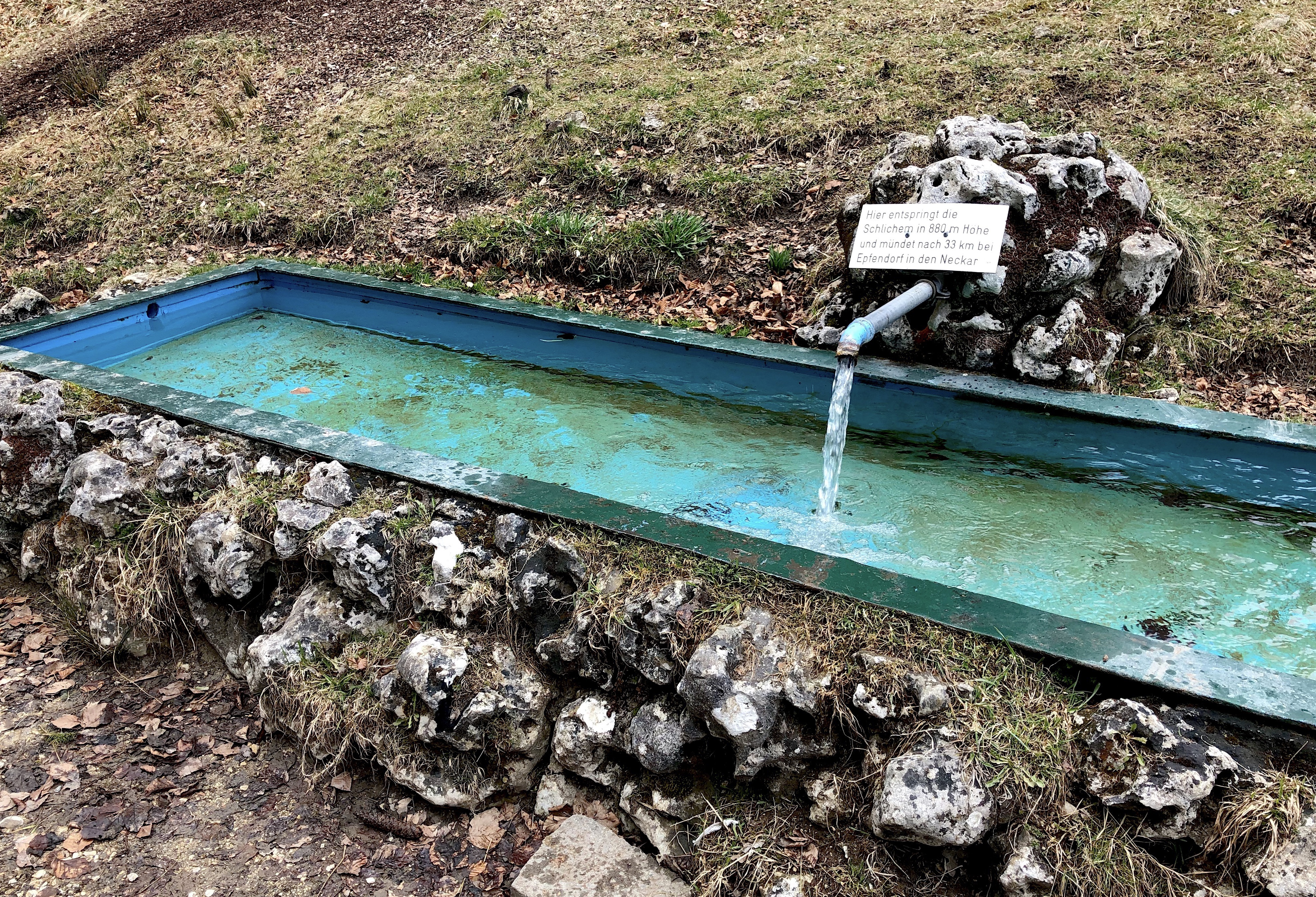
Origin of the Schlichem at an elevation of 880 metres (2,890 ft), spring near Tieringen

Its source is located 1.5 kilometres (0.93 mi) north of Tieringen (district of Meßstetten) at an elevation of 880 m above sea Level. The river approaches the European watershed in the centre of Tieringen. The closest distance is 50 metres (160 ft). Beyond this, the Upper Bära, which also originates in Tieringen, competes with the Danube.

On its 34.4-kilometre-long (21.4 mi) way westwards through the Swabian Alb, the foothills of the Alb and the Gäulandschaft along the course of the Neckar, the Schlichen crosses or passes through the following towns and communities:

- Tieringen
- Hausen am Tann (750 m. above sea level)
- Ratshausen (675 m. above sea level)
- Schömberg (Schlichemtalsperre: 640 m. above sea level)
- Dautmergen (608 meters above sea level)
- Täbingen (639 m above sea level)
- Dieting (districts of Böhringen 575 m above sea level, and Rotezimmer 573 m above sea level)
- Epfendorf (570 m. above sea level)

At Schömberg, the Schlichem is dammed up by the Schlichemtalsperre to form a reservoir, which is also developed as a bathing lake. It is crossed by the Schlichem Viaduct of the Balingen-Schömberg railway line. (former railway line Balingen-Rottweil).

East of Epfendorf the Schlichem river flows about two kilometres below the so-called Schlichemklamm. (local name Schlichem-Gumpen) in the nature reserve Schlichemtal, which stretches down to this, from the right into the upper Neckar.

=== Catchment area ===
The catchment area of the Schlichem, which covers almost 109 km^{2} (42 sq mi), borders in the northwest on that of the small downstream Neckar tributary Schenkenbach. Behind the following, very long watershed in the northeast, first the Stunzach, then longer its receiving water Eyach competes. In the southeast the already mentioned Upper Baer runs over the Baer to the Danube, then at the left watershed first in the south the right upper course Lower Baer. In the southwest some other brooks on the other side of the river are again flowing from the right to the Neckar, worth mentioning among them are successively the medium Starzel and the small Weiherbach, which flow to the Neckar via the Prim, and the direct inflow Wettebach.

The highest elevations in the catchment area rise above the plateaus on both sides of the upper course valley in the Alb, which are often above 950 m (3,120 ft). The highest point is the forested peak of the Rainen southeast of Ratshausen at 1,006.1 m (3,301 ft), over which the southern watershed passes. The similarly high right watershed just misses the 1000-meter mark at the upper part of the run with 998.6 m (3,276 ft) on the summit Gespaltener Fels of the Schafberg plateau.

== Tributaries ==
- Böllatgraben (left)
- Engenbach (right)
- Reutegraben (left)
- Rötegrabenbach (right)
- Waldhausbach (right)
- Schlichembach (left)
- Steinlegraben (right)
- Egertbächle (left)
- Wettebach (left)
- Talgraben (right)
- Mittelbach (left)
- Holzingerberggraben (right)
- Weilenbach (left)
- Hätzenbolgraben (right)
- Reisbruckgraben (left)
- Hölzlegraben (right)
- Galgenbühlgraben (right)
- Schönhager-Lochbrunnen (left)
- Erlenwiesengraben (left)
- Sulzgraben (left)
- Hohler Graben (right)
- Golterngraben (right)
- Weiherbach (left)
- Erlenbach (right)
- Heimbach (right)
- Augraben (right)
- Schwarzenbach (left)

== See also ==
- List of rivers of Baden-Württemberg
