= Obernheim =

German municipality

- Municipality
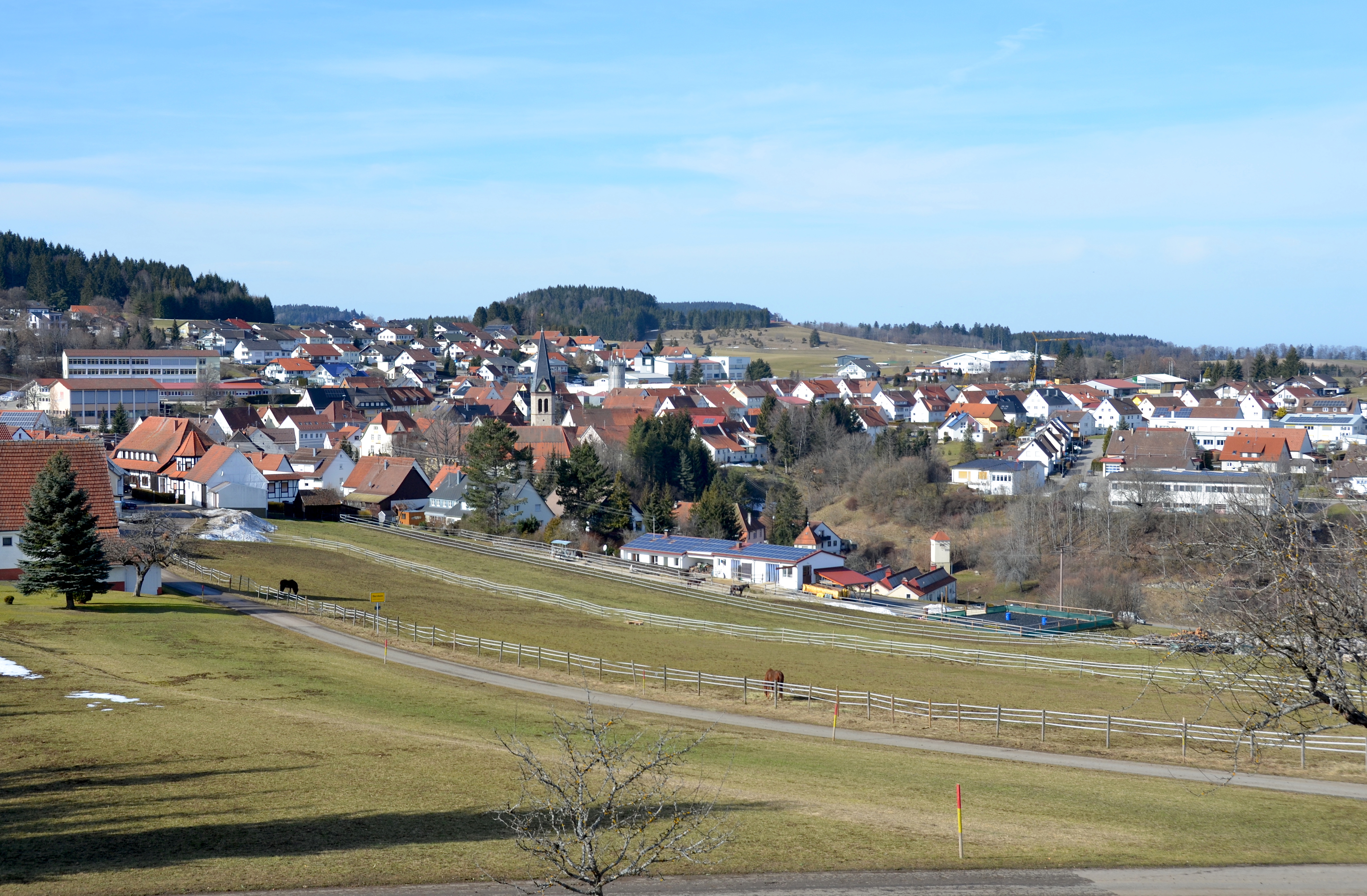
- View across Obernheim

- Coat of arms

- Location of Obernheim within Zollernalbkreis district
- Interactive map of Obernheim
- Location within Germany Location within Baden-Württemberg
- Coordinates: 48°09′45″N 08°51′42″E
- Country: Germany
- State: Baden-Württemberg
- Admin. region: Tübingen
- District: Zollernalbkreis

Government
  - Mayor (2018–26): Josef Ungermann

Area
  - Total: 15.02 km^{2} (5.80 sq mi)
- Elevation: 897 m (2,943 ft)

Population (2025-12-31)
  - Total: 1,426
  - Density: 94.94/km^{2} (245.9/sq mi)
- Time zone: UTC+01:00 (CET)
  - Summer (DST): UTC+02:00 (CEST)
- Postal codes: 72364
- Dialling codes: 07436
- Vehicle registration: BL
- Website: www.obernheim.de

Obernheim is a municipality of the Zollernalbkreis district of Baden-Württemberg, Germany.

== History ==
Obernheim became a possession of the Kingdom of Württemberg in 1805 and was assigned to Oberamt Balingen. Five years later, in 1810, it was reassigned to Oberamt Spaichingen, which was merged into Landkreis Balingen in 1938. Obernheim grew and industrialized after the Second World War, first expanding in the 1950s to the north-east and west, and then in the 1970s to the north once more. As part of the 1973 Baden-Württemberg district reform, Landkreis Balingen was dissolved and Obernheim was assigned to the newly created Zollernalb district. There was further municipal growth to the northeast in the 1980s and 1990s.

== Geography ==
The municipality (Gemeinde) of Obernheimof is located along the southern edge Zollernalb district of Baden-Württemberg, one of the Federal Republic of Germany's 16 States. It lies along the border with Tuttlingen district and the western edge of the Kuppenalb, between the Upper and Lower Bära rivers, in the High Swabian Jura. Elevation above sea level ranges in the municipality from a high of 988 meters (3,241 ft) Normalnull (NN) to a low of 751 meters (2,464 ft) NN.

A portion of the Federally-protected Stromelsberg-Hessenbühl nature reserve is located in Obernheim's municipal area.

== Demographics ==
Population development:

| Year | Inhabitants |
|---|---|
| 1990 | 1,529 |
| 2001 | 1,547 |
| 2011 | 1,450 |
| 2021 | 1,505 |

== Coat of arms ==
Obernheim's coat of arms is a field of white crossed by a single blue bar. This pattern was adapted from the personal blazon of Johann von Obernheim, a local 14th century nobleman, and was approved for official use by the provisional post-WWII Württemberg-Hohenzollern government on 27 October 1950. A corresponding flag was issued on 15 January 1982.

== Transportation ==
Obernheim was connected to the Heuberg Railway until its station was closed in 1996. Local public transportation is provided by the Verkehrsverbund Neckar-Alb-Donau.
