= Katzenbach (Neckar) =

River in Germany

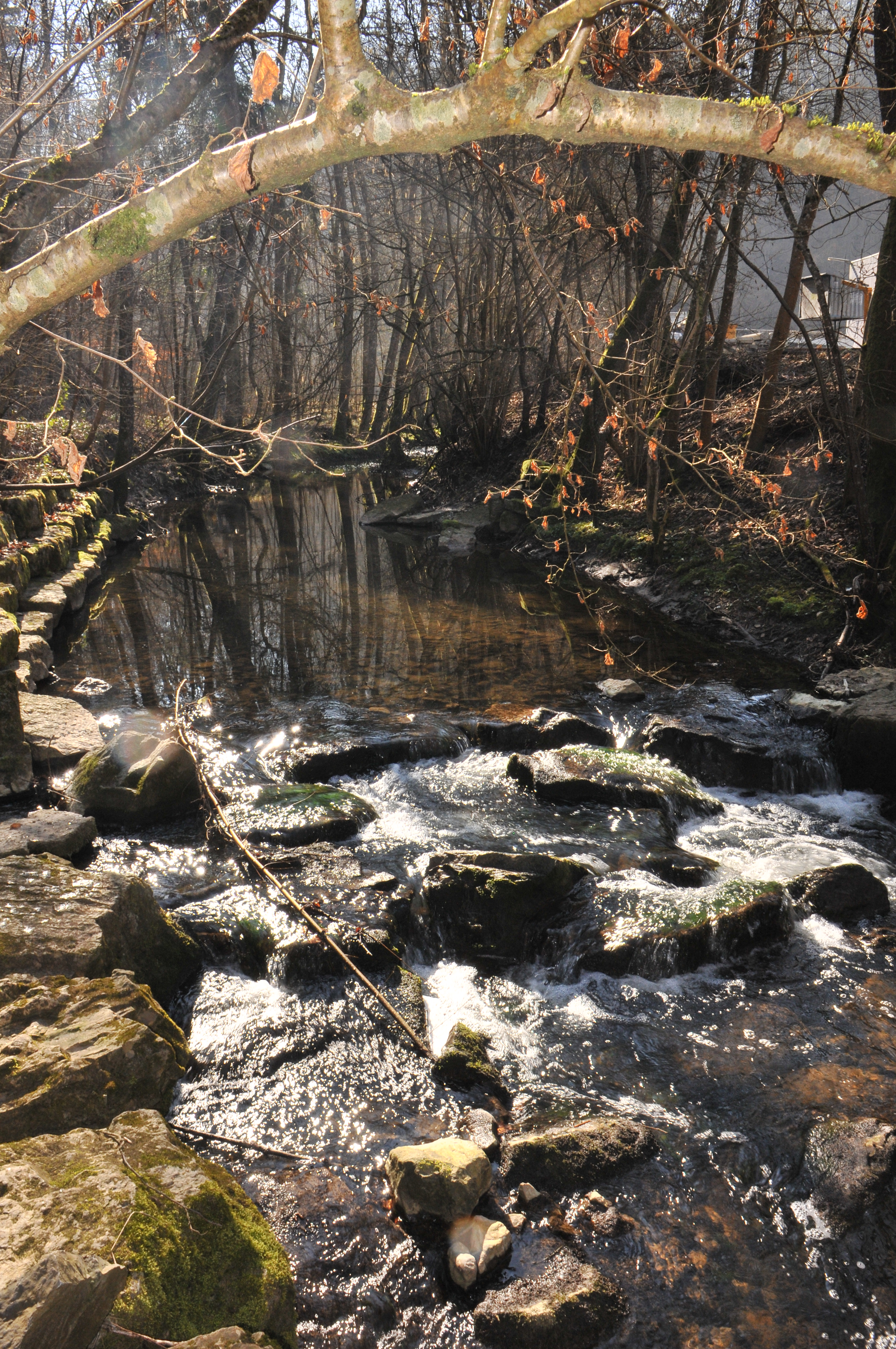

Location
- Country: Germany
- State: Baden-Württemberg

Physical characteristics
- Mouth
  - location: Neckar
  - coordinates: 48.4575°N 8.8981°E
- Length: 17.1 km (10.6 mi)
- Basin size: 50,954 km^{2} (19,673 sq mi)

Basin features
- Progression: Neckar→ Rhine→ North Sea

Katzenbach (in its upper course: Beurenbach) is a river of Baden-Württemberg, Germany. It flows into the Neckar in Bad Niedernau.

== See also ==
- List of rivers of Baden-Württemberg
