= Ortenberg (mountain) =

Mountain in Baden-Württemberg, Germany

Coordinates: 48°10′N 8°48′E

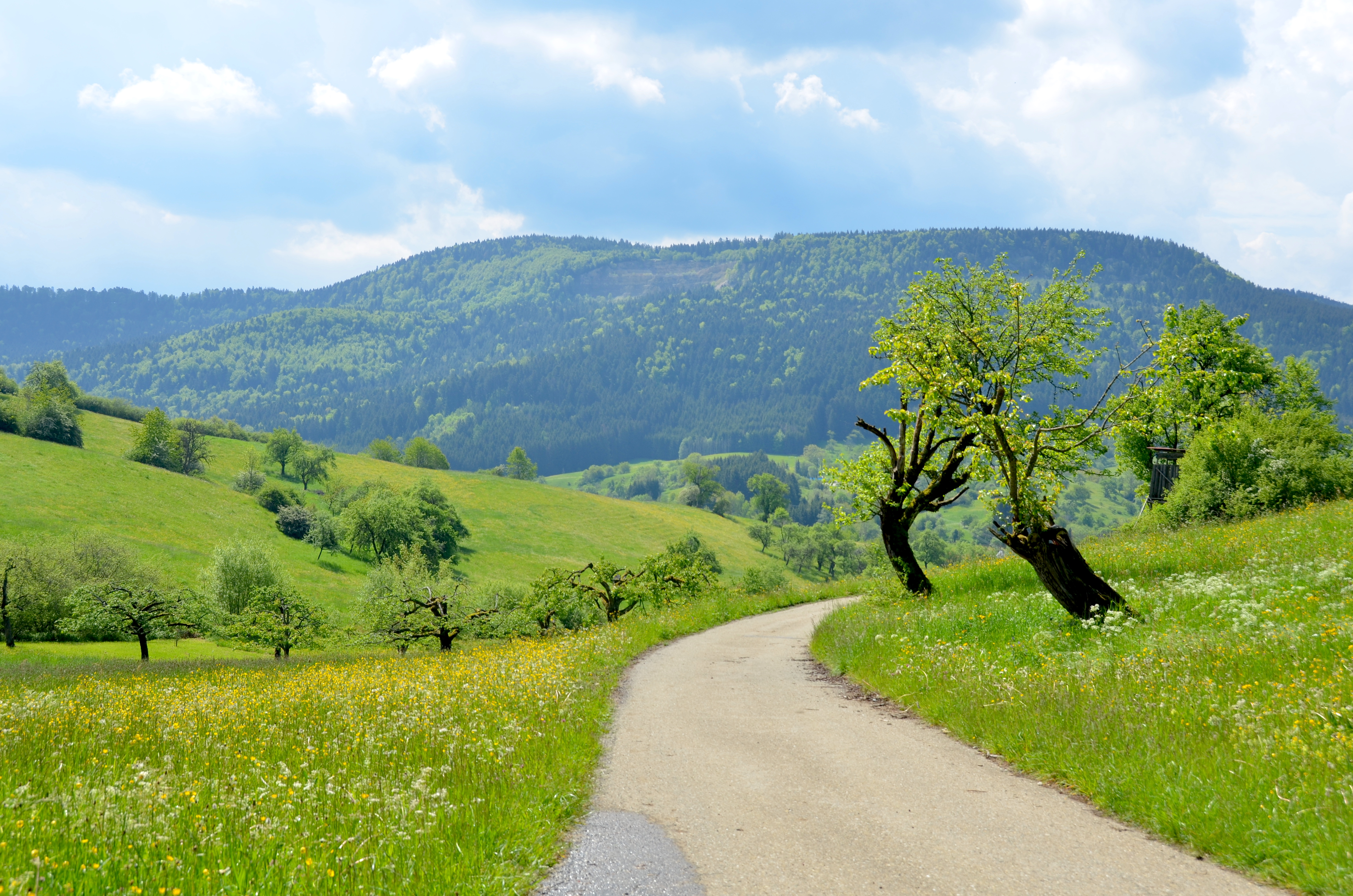
- The Ortenberg from the north

Highest point
- Elevation: 995 m (3,264 ft)

Geography
- Location: Baden-Württemberg, Germany

Ortenberg (German pronunciation: [ˈɔʁtn̩bɛʁk]) is a mountain of Baden-Württemberg, Germany. It lies on the southwest of the Swabian Jura, on the southern slope of the Upper Schlichem valley near Deilingen in the Tuttlingen district. It is part of the Großer Heuberg.
