= Dautmergen =

German municipality

- Municipality
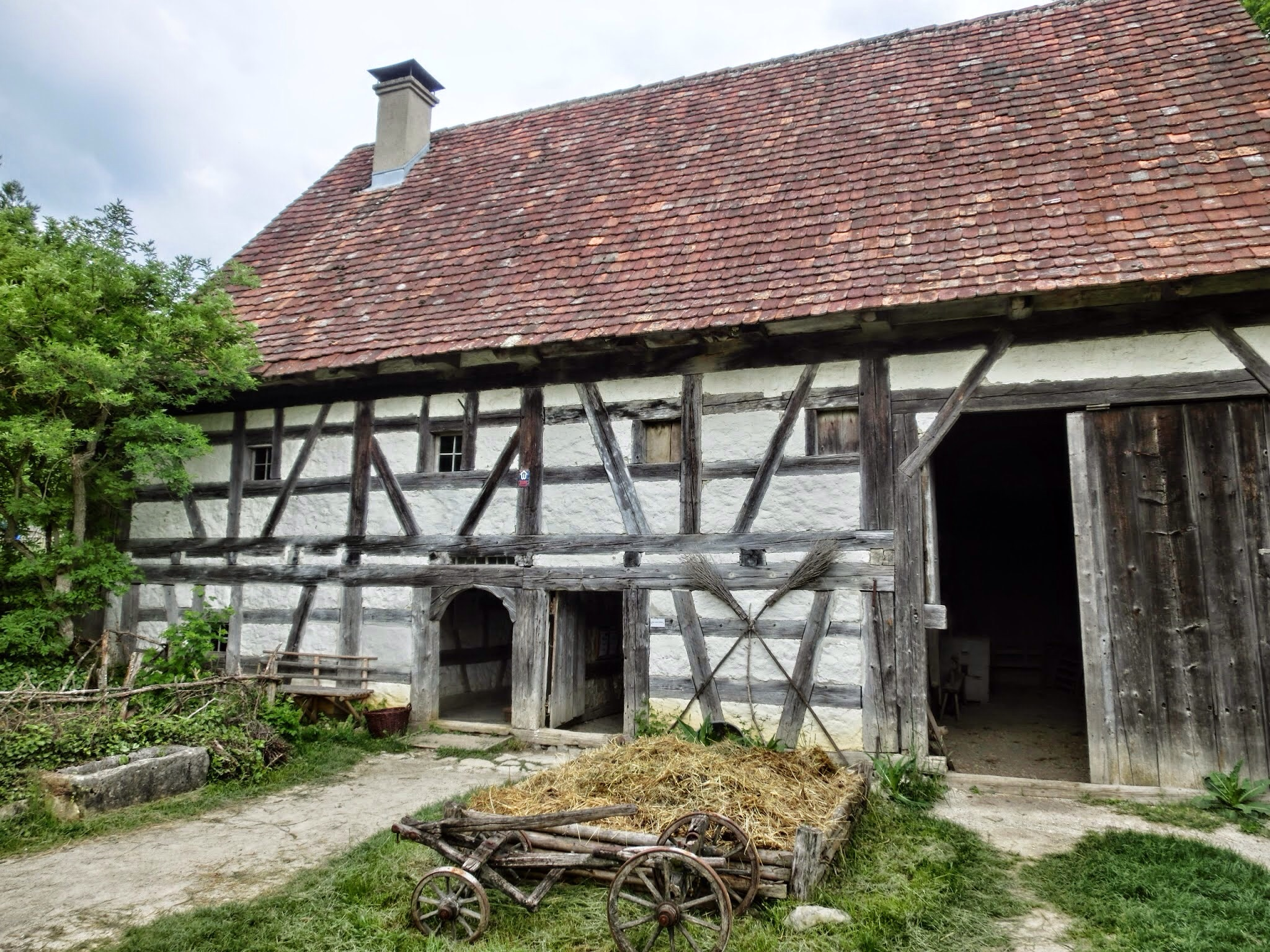
- Dautmergen open air museum

- Coat of arms

- Location of Dautmergen within Zollernalbkreis district
- Interactive map of Dautmergen
- Location within Germany Location within Baden-Württemberg
- Coordinates: 48°14′35″N 08°44′27″E
- Country: Germany
- State: Baden-Württemberg
- Admin. region: Tübingen
- District: Zollernalbkreis

Government
  - Mayor: Hans Joachim Lippus

Area
  - Total: 4.54 km^{2} (1.75 sq mi)
- Elevation: 608 m (1,995 ft)

Population (2025-12-31)
  - Total: 462
  - Density: 102/km^{2} (264/sq mi)
- Time zone: UTC+01:00 (CET)
  - Summer (DST): UTC+02:00 (CEST)
- Postal codes: 72356
- Dialling codes: 07427
- Vehicle registration: BL
- Website: www.gemeinde-dautmergen.de

Dautmergen is a municipality in the Zollernalbkreis district of Baden-Württemberg, Germany.

== History ==
Dautmergen was a possession of the County of Hohenberg until 1381, when it became part of the Duchy of Austria's territory in Swabia. The town was given to the Kingdom of Württemberg in 1805 during the process of German mediatization. The town was assigned to Oberamt Spaichingen when that district was organized in 1806. Around 1812, the town was reassigned to Oberamt Rottweil and remained in that district when it was reorganized in 1934 as a Landkreis. This was dissolved in 1938 and Dautmergen was again reassigned, this time to Landkreis Balingen. A subcamp of the Natzweiler-Struthof concentration camp was constructed at Dautmergen during the Second World War. After the war, Dautmergen developed into a commuter town and expanded to the north.

== Geography ==
The municipality (Gemeinde) of Dautmergen covers 4.54 square kilometers (1.75 sq mi) of the Zollernalb district of the German state of Baden-Württemberg. It is physically located in the foothills of the Swabian Jura, specifically towards the center of the Schlichem valley. The valley marks the lowest elevation above sea level in the municipal area at 590 meters (1,940 ft) Normalnull (NN). The highest elevation, 985 meters (3,232 ft) NN, is found to the southwest of Dautmergen itself.

Dautmergen itself is located near the Schlichem dam.

== Coat of arms ==
Dautmergen's coat of arms is divided into thirds, with a white chief, red fess, and yellow field, which contains a lion rendered in black with red claws. The tincture and pattern of the coat of arms reference the historical owners of Dautmergen: the red-white blazon are for the County of Hohenberg and for Austria and the yellow field and lion are for Württemberg. This pattern was first approved by the Post-war provisional Württemberg-Hohenzollern government on 11 January 1949, and then by the Zollernalb district office on 7 December 1987.

== Transportation ==
Dautmergen is connected to the German system of highways by Bundesstraße 27. Public transportation is provided by the Verkehrsverbund Neckar-Alb-Donau.
