= Rosenfeld, Germany =

German town

Rosenfeld
- Town
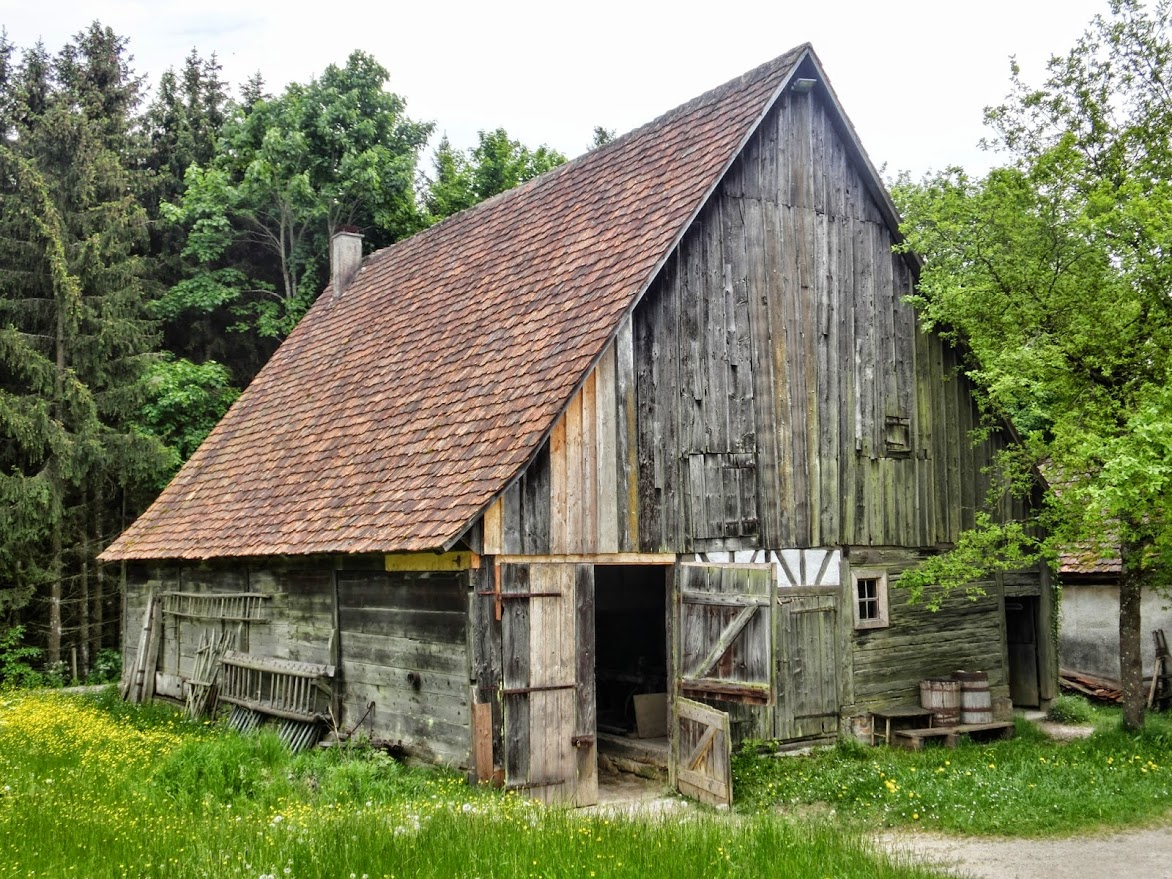
- Freilichtmuseum in Rosenfeld

- Coat of arms

- Location of Rosenfeld within Zollernalbkreis district
- Interactive map of Rosenfeld
- Location within Germany Location within Baden-Württemberg
- Coordinates: 48°17′11″N 08°43′27″E
- Country: Germany
- State: Baden-Württemberg
- Admin. region: Tübingen
- District: Zollernalbkreis
- Subdivisions: 7 Stadtteile

Area
  - Total: 51.11 km^{2} (19.73 sq mi)
- Elevation: 620 m (2,030 ft)

Population (2025-12-31)
  - Total: 6,426
  - Density: 125.7/km^{2} (325.6/sq mi)
- Time zone: UTC+01:00 (CET)
  - Summer (DST): UTC+02:00 (CEST)
- Postal codes: 72348
- Dialling codes: 07428
- Vehicle registration: BL
- Website: www.rosenfeld.de

Rosenfeld (German pronunciation: [ˈʁoːzn̩ˌfɛlt]) is a town in the Zollernalbkreis district of Baden-Württemberg, Germany.

== History ==
Rosenfeld became a possession of the County, later Duchy, of Württemberg, which made the town the seat of its own district. In 1808, that district was dissolved and Rosenfeld was assigned to Oberamt Sulz. That district, too, was dissolved in 1938 and Rosenfeld was reassigned to the district of Balingen. Rosenfeld underwent a period of growth after World War II, beginning in the 1950s with new housing to the east of the town, and continuing into the 1980s with more residential, commercial, and industrial areas. Following the 1973 Baden-Württemberg district reform, the town was again reassigned to the newly-formed Zollernalb district. Rosenfeld merged with the towns of Heiligenzimmern and Leidringen on 1 January 1975.

== Geography ==
The township (Stadt) of Rosenfeld is located politically in the Zollernalbkreis district of Baden-Württemberg and physically in the Little Heuberg, part of the Swabian Jura. Elevation above sea level varies in the municipal area from a low of 469 meters (1,539 ft) Normalnull (NN) to a high of 700 meters (2,300 ft) NN.

The Federally-protected Häselteiche and Immerland nature reserves are located within the municipal area.

== Coat of arms ==
Rosenfeld's municipal coat of arms displays a five-petaled, white rose with gold seeds and green sepals on a field of red. This pattern, in use by the town of Rosenfeld since 1372, was approved for official use by the Zollernalb district office on 11 May 1976.
