= Plettenberg (mountain) =

Mountain in Baden-Württemberg, Germany

- The Plettenberg, seen from north

Highest point
- Elevation: 1,002 m above sea level (NHN) (3,287 ft)
- Isolation: 3.72 m (12.2 ft) to Rainen
- Coordinates: 48°12′49″N 8°48′27″E

Geography
- Location within Baden-Württemberg
- Location: Baden-Württemberg, Germany
- Parent range: Swabian Jura

Geology
- Rock type: White Jurassic

Plettenberg is a mountain of Baden-Württemberg, Germany. It is located in Zollernalbkreis.

== Vegetation ==
The Plettenberg is not wooded. However, the sharp transition to forest illustrates it is no natural border. Even the top of the mountain does not reach the tree line which, in this region, would lie at around 1,650–1,700 metres.

Many of the open areas are habitats for specialised species of flora; these include bogs, rock faces and snow fields. Below the summit the mountain is covered by mixed forest consisting of beech, rowan, spruce and silver fir.

That is attributable to the intensive sheep farming in this region, which limits forest growth. In 2017 milling machines was used in the sensitive area.
