= Eyach (Neckar) =

River in Germany

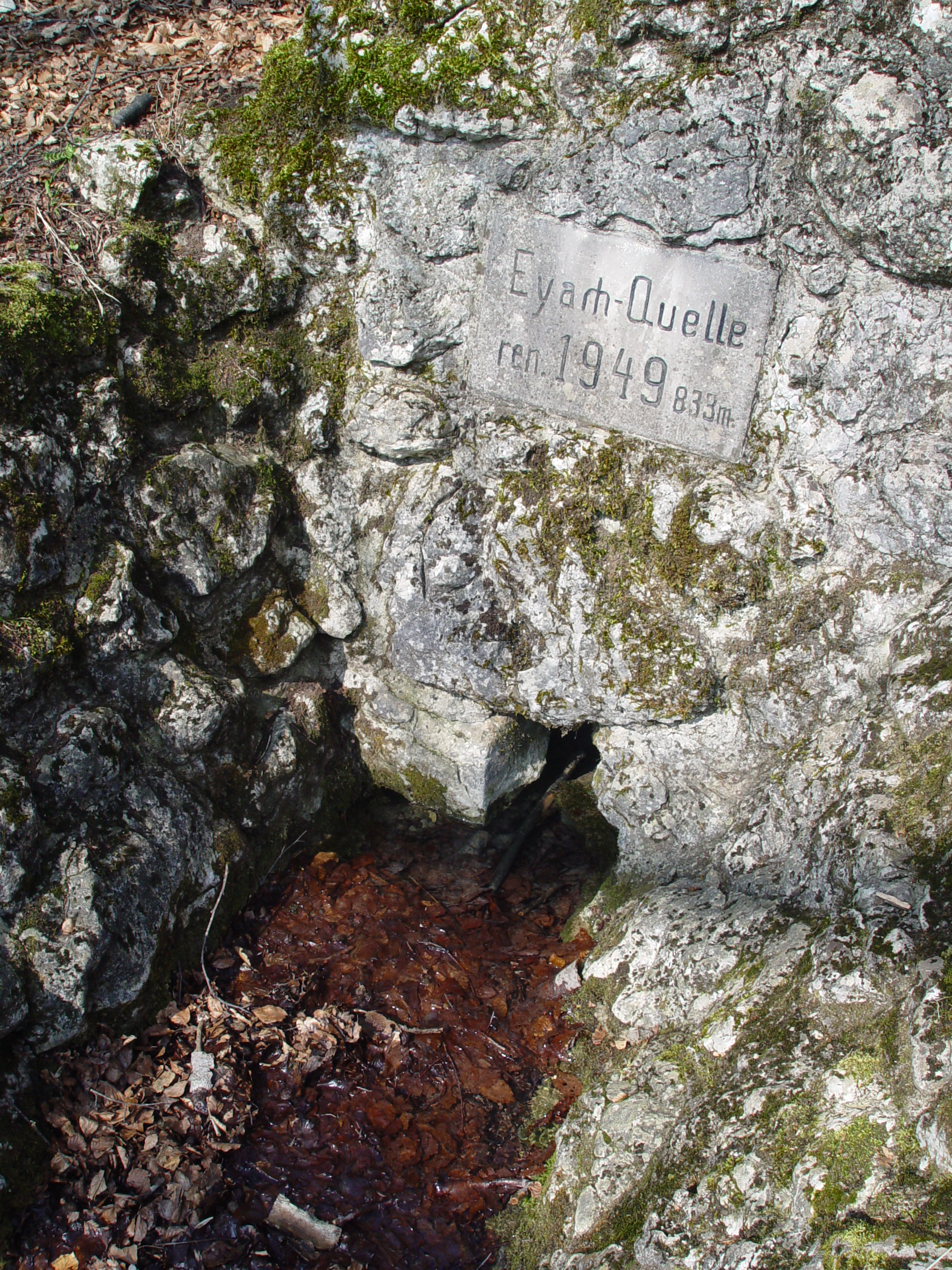

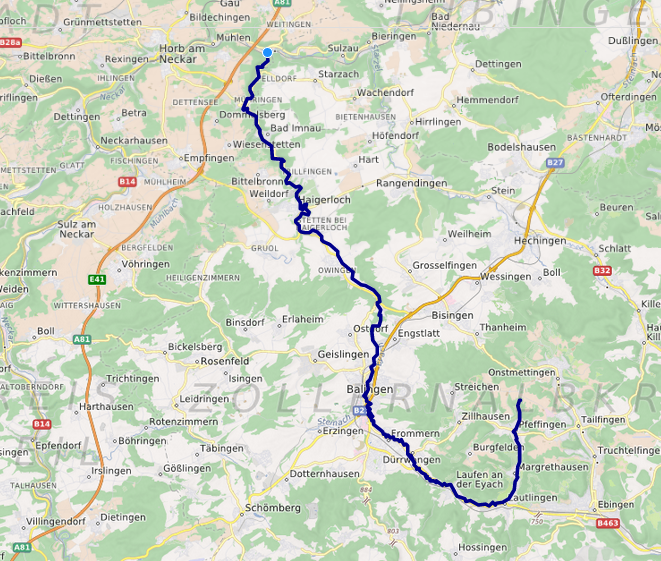
- Course of the Eyach (interactive map)

Location
- Country: Germany
- State: Baden-Württemberg

Physical characteristics
- Mouth
  - location: Neckar
  - coordinates: 48.4457°N 8.7769°E
- Length: 50.4 km (31.3 mi)
- Basin size: 354 km^{2} (137 sq mi)

Basin features
- Progression: Neckar→ Rhine→ North Sea

Eyach is a river of Baden-Württemberg, Germany. It flows for 50 kilometres. It is a right tributary of the Neckar. It passes through Balingen and Haigerloch, and flows into the Neckar near Starzach.

== Geography ==
=== History ===
The Eyach has its source north of Pfeffingen (a district of Albstadt) at an altitude of 833 metres, only a few hundred metres from the European watershed and a tributary of the Danube, the Schmiecha, which has its source there. At Eyach at a height of 372 m from the right it flows into the Neckar. Its mean discharge at the mouth is 3.23 m^{3}/s.

=== Tributaries ===
From source to meadow

- Innentalbach, right
- Buchbach, left
- Wünschtalbach, right
- Kieserstalbach
- Irrenbach
- Rohrbach
- Ochsentalbach, left
- Käsentaler Bach, right
- Meßstetter Talbach, left
- Kehlenbach, right
- Bruckbach (!), left
- (unnamed creek from the Reuten), left
- Lauterbach, left
- Steinbach, left
- Eltschbach, right
- Zerrenstallbach, left
- Hakenbach, left
- Strichgraben, left
- Schalksbach, right
- Rappentalbach, left
- Bitzgraben, right
- Grundbach, left
- Beutenbach, left
- Böllbach, right
- Hühnerbach, left
- Steinach, left
- Etzelbach, right
- Reichenbach, right
- Talgraben, left
- Kaunterbach, left
- Schnürgraben, left
- Talbach, right
- Klingenbach, right
- Talbach, right
- Mittelsbach, left
- Dietenbach, right
- Rötenbach, left
- Sulzbach, right
- Stunzach, left
- Bruckbach (!), right
- Butzengraben, left
- Laibebach, left
- Feldbach, right
- Kegelbach, left
- Kohlwaldgraben, right

=== Places by the river ===
On its almost 50 km long way to the northwest the Eyach crosses or passes through the following communities:

- Albstadt
- Balingen
- Haigerloch
- Horb am Neckar
- Starzach

At Eyach or the train station Eyach, two kilometers west of the village Börstingen (a district of Starzach), the Eyach flows into the Neckar.

=== Mofette ===
In Bad Imnau carbon dioxide was found in an underground inlet to the river. Today this water is sold under the name Apollo in bottles.

== See also ==
- List of rivers of Baden-Württemberg
