= Zollernalbkreis =

Coordinates: 48°17′N 8°56′E

- District
- Flag Coat of arms
- Country: Germany
- State: Baden-Württemberg
- Adm. region: Tübingen
- Capital: Balingen

Government
  - District admin.: Günther-Martin Pauli (CDU)

Area
  - Total: 917.7 km^{2} (354.3 sq mi)

Population (31 December 2024)
  - Total: 193,326
  - Density: 210.7/km^{2} (545.6/sq mi)
- Time zone: UTC+01:00 (CET)
  - Summer (DST): UTC+02:00 (CEST)
- Vehicle registration: BL, HCH
- Website: www.zollernalbkreis.de

The Zollernalbkreis (German pronunciation: [ˈtsɔlɐnʔalpˌkʁaɪs]) is a Landkreis (district) in the middle of Baden-Württemberg, Germany. The district is located in the Swabian Alb, and contains the second highest elevation of this range, the 1,011-metre (3,317 ft) high Oberhohenberg. In the south-east the district nearly reaches to the river Danube.

The district was created on January 1, 1973, when the two previous districts Balingen and Hechingen were merged.

Neighboring districts are (from north clockwise) Tübingen, Reutlingen, Sigmaringen, Tuttlingen, Rottweil and Freudenstadt.

== Coat of arms ==
The coat of arms shows the black-and-white checkered symbol of Hohenzollern in the left half, and the triple black deer antler on the yellow ground as the symbol of Württemberg. Almost all of the district's area belonged to these two states historically.

== Towns (Städte) and municipalities (Gemeinden) ==
Clickable map of municipalities in the district

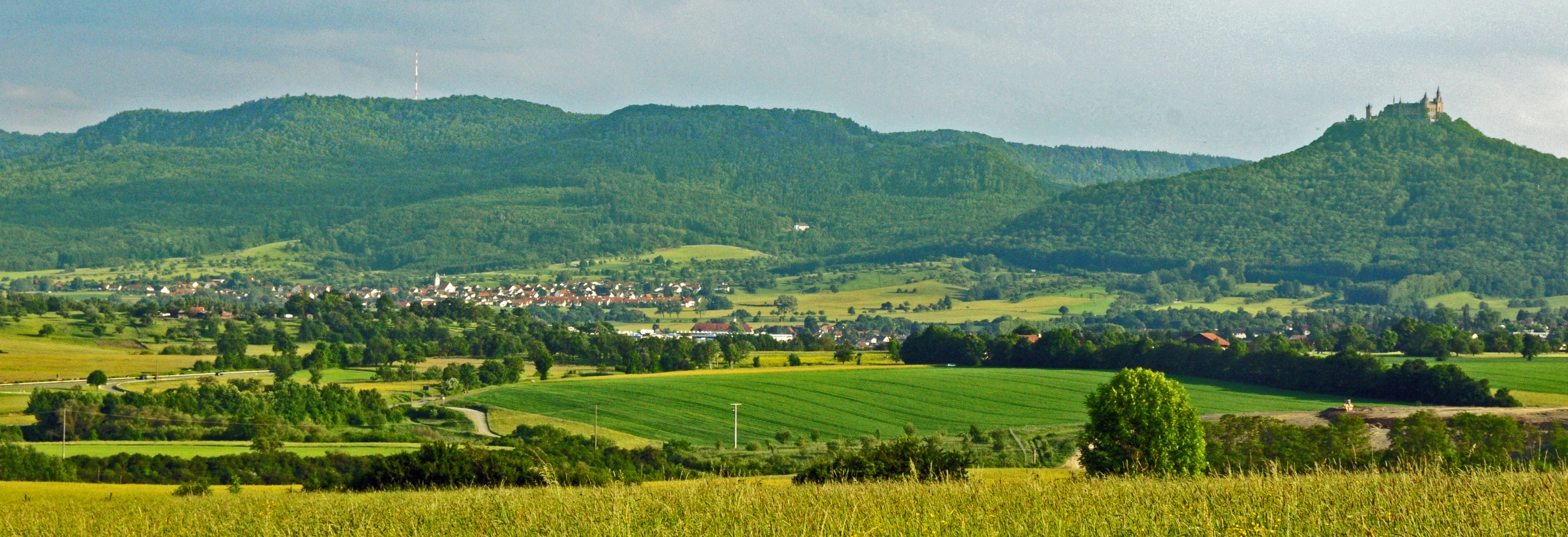
Alb mountains and Zollern castle

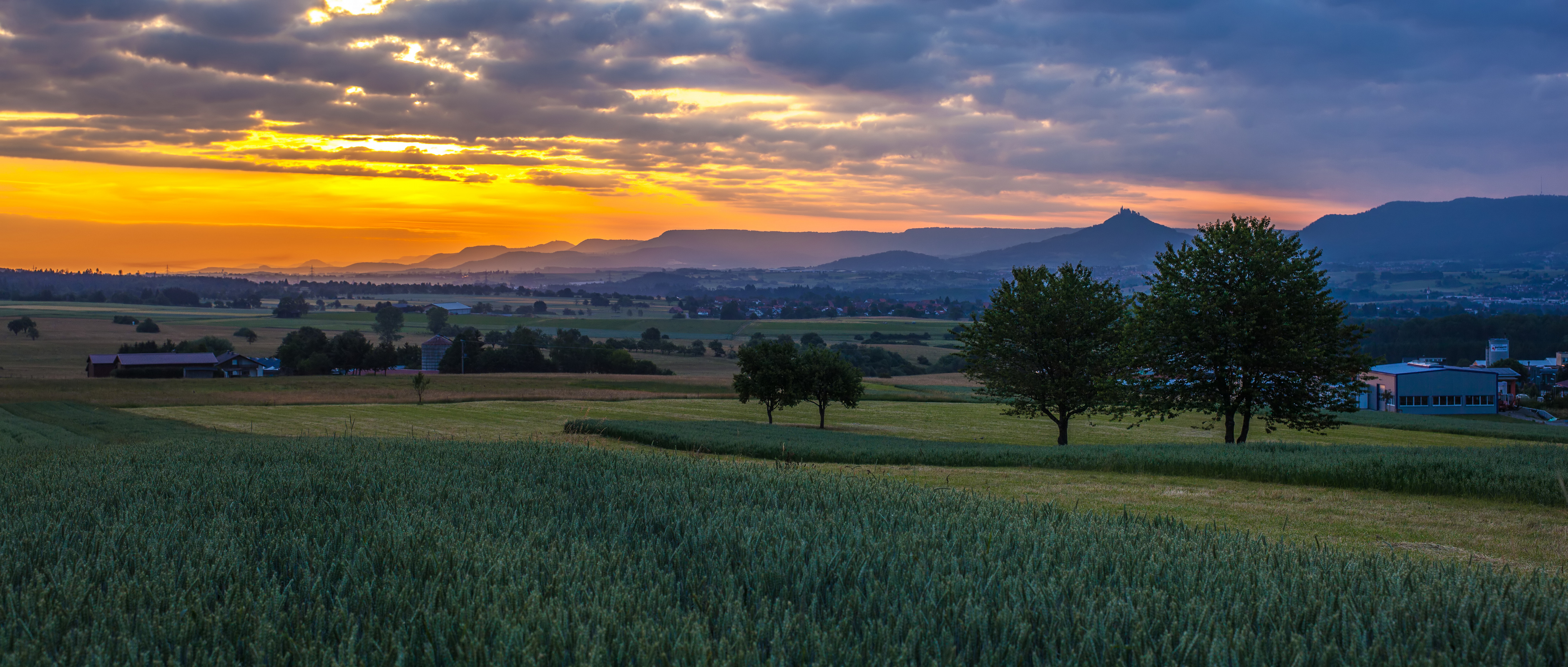
The "Albtrauf" in Zollernalbkreis

Towns (Städte)	Municipalities (Gemeinden)
1. Albstadt; 2. Balingen; 3. Burladingen; 4. Geislingen; 5. Haigerloch; 6. Hechingen; 7. Meßstetten; 8. Ostdorf; 9. Rosenfeld; 10. Schömberg	1. Bisingen; 2. Bitz; 3. Dautmergen; 4. Dormettingen; 5. Dotternhausen; 6. Grosselfingen; 7. Hausen am Tann; 8. Jungingen; 9. Nusplingen; 10. Obernheim; 11. Rangendingen; 12. Ratshausen; 13. Straßberg; 14. Weilen unter den Rinnen; 15. Winterlingen; 16. Zimmern unter der Burg
Verwaltungsgemeinschaften	1. Bisingen; 2. Bitz; 3. Dautmergen; 4. Dormettingen; 5. Dotternhausen; 6. Grosselfingen; 7. Hausen am Tann; 8. Jungingen; 9. Nusplingen; 10. Obernheim; 11. Rangendingen; 12. Ratshausen; 13. Straßberg; 14. Weilen unter den Rinnen; 15. Winterlingen; 16. Zimmern unter der Burg
1. Albstadt; 2. Balingen; 3. Bisingen; 4. Hechingen; 5. Meßstetten; 6. Oberes Schlichemtal; 7. Winterlingen	1. Bisingen; 2. Bitz; 3. Dautmergen; 4. Dormettingen; 5. Dotternhausen; 6. Grosselfingen; 7. Hausen am Tann; 8. Jungingen; 9. Nusplingen; 10. Obernheim; 11. Rangendingen; 12. Ratshausen; 13. Straßberg; 14. Weilen unter den Rinnen; 15. Winterlingen; 16. Zimmern unter der Burg

== Language ==
In the area of Zollernalbkreis, Swabian German is spoken. In former times, Yiddish, Pleißne and Romani was also spoken. The Pleißne was spoken by hawkers selling items such as baskets, brushes, and whips, and belongs to Rotwelsch. It was used as a code.

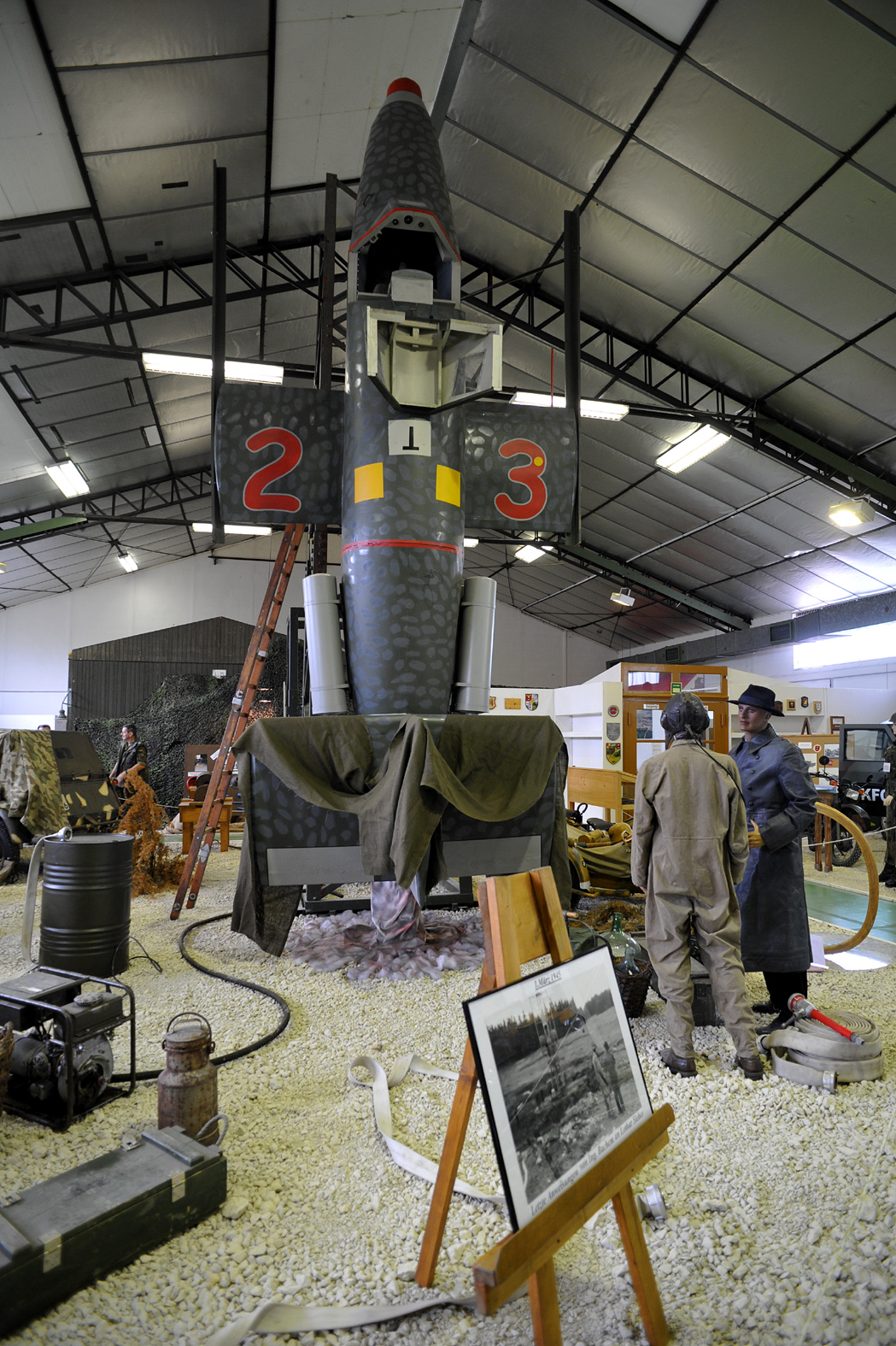
Trailing scene, Sieber discusses with Erich Bachem in Straßberg the final launch preparations, at the Militärgeschichtliche Sammlung Stetten am kalten Markt

== Smuggler ==
Within the Heuberg Training Area there is the legendary Dreibannmarke, also called the "Bahn", a 17th-century border, which today marks the border between three different municipalities, formerly in the three states of Württemberg, Baden, and Hohenzollern. The meadow at the Dreibannmarke served as a stopping place for traveling merchants, wagons and craftsmen. With care it is possible to identify traces of the border. After the inauguration of the firing ranges, a meadow in Meßstetten was allocated as a camping site at the edge of the restricted area. Until 1835 merchandise was smuggled over the customs borders guarded by local hunters. Hans Ungnad von Weißenwolff, Freiherr von Sonneck, Hans III.(1493–1564) Bible printer and smuggler in Bad Urach Coffee smuggler Haux had was killed on 21 July 1831 in Pfaffental.

== Ébénistes ==
Ébénistes make case furniture, either veneered or painted. Frommern was the world capital of furniture in the time of Wirtschaftswunder. In Frommern a line of high polished industrial production take up the ideas of the royal Hofebenist. In the Haus der Volkskunstof the Schwäbischer Albverein the traditional Himmelbett is use as a hotel bed.

== Mining ==
Sandstone, limestone, black coal and sand have been the primary products mined. The Goldhöhle mine was in Erlaheim near Mildersbach, Schwefelkies, in Geislingen. It later collapsed. In former times iron ore was mined on the Heuberg. Fidel Eppler was the name of the mine inspector. The buttress wood was bought in Truchtelfingen and used by Lautlingen miners at the Hörnle area. In Oberdigisheim Geppert in 1738 SHW-Ludwigsthal produced iron ore. From an old 3.5 km mine in an ooidal iron ore seam (Doggererzflöz) in Weilheim is wood in the Tuttlinger Fruchtkasten. Steel was produced in Tuttlingen by the Schwäbische Hüttenwerke in Ludwigstal, which produces now iron brakes. In Meßstetten-Michelfeld sand was found in an old arm of Danube. Christian Kiesinger (1876–1969) father of Kurt Georg Kiesinger had a factory. Ooidal iron ore (Bohnerz aus Eisenroggenstein) was found. After the Franco-Prussian War the mining was stopped. In Germany coal mining stopped 2018.

black stone was mined for Operation Desert (German fuel project). Black coal is mined from the Posidonia Shale. Jet work (to make black jewellery which was very fashionable), was called Beinschnitzen.
