= Count of Hohenberg =

Swabian dynasty

Counts of Hohenberg
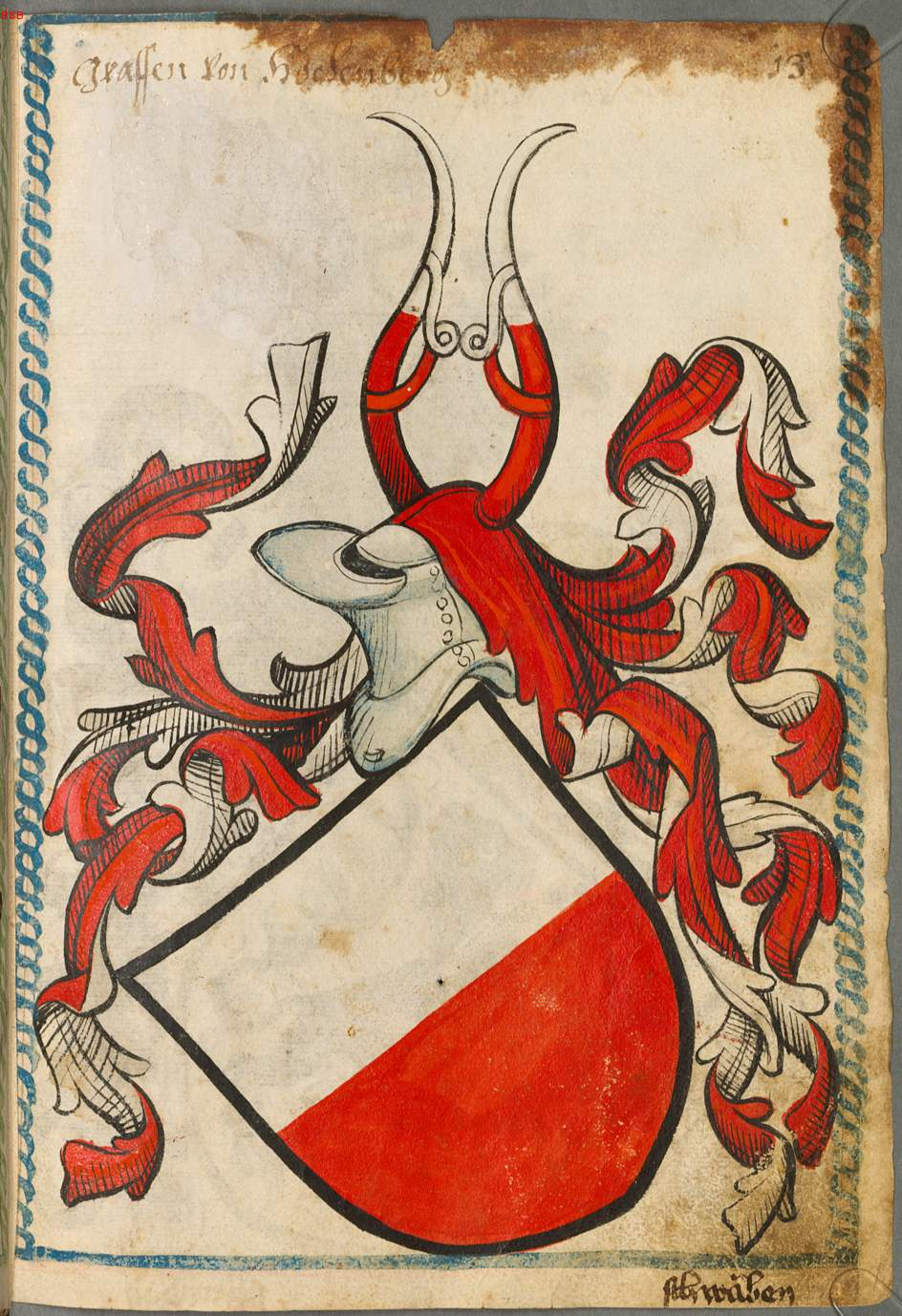
- Coat of arms of the Hohenbergs in the Scheibler Armorial of 1450
- Place of origin: Swabia
- Dissolution: 15th century

The Counts of Hohenberg (or Margraves of Hohenberg) were an ancient Swabian dynasty in the southwest of the present-day German state of Baden-Württemberg.

== History ==
During the 13th century, the Hohenberg dynasty was one of the most prominent lineages in southwestern Germany. In 1381, however, Rudolf III, Count of Hohenberg, who was highly indebted and had no male successor, sold the core of the county to the House of Habsburg. About 100 years later, the last sideline died out. The County of Hohenberg persisted de jure until 1806.
