= Christian Landenberger =

German painter

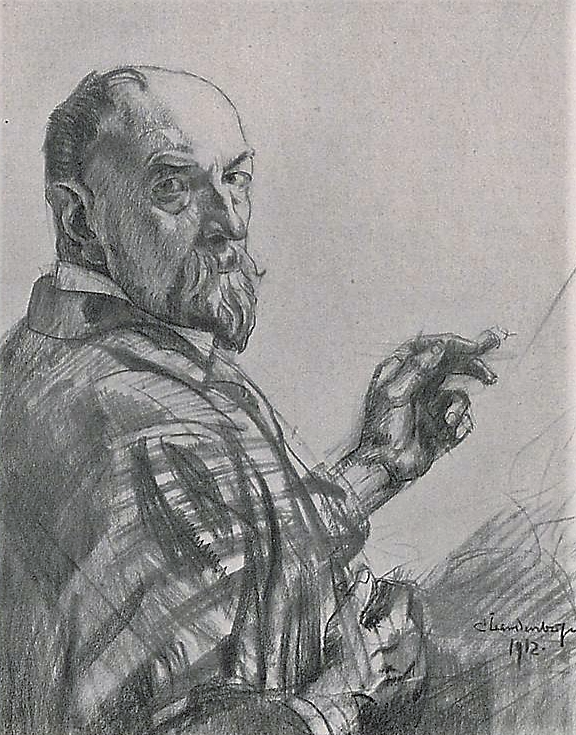
Self-portrait (1912)

Christian Adam Landenberger (7 April 1862, Ebingen - 13 February 1927, Stuttgart) was a German Impressionist painter and a professor at the State Academy of Fine Arts Stuttgart. He is especially known for his landscapes.

== Life ==
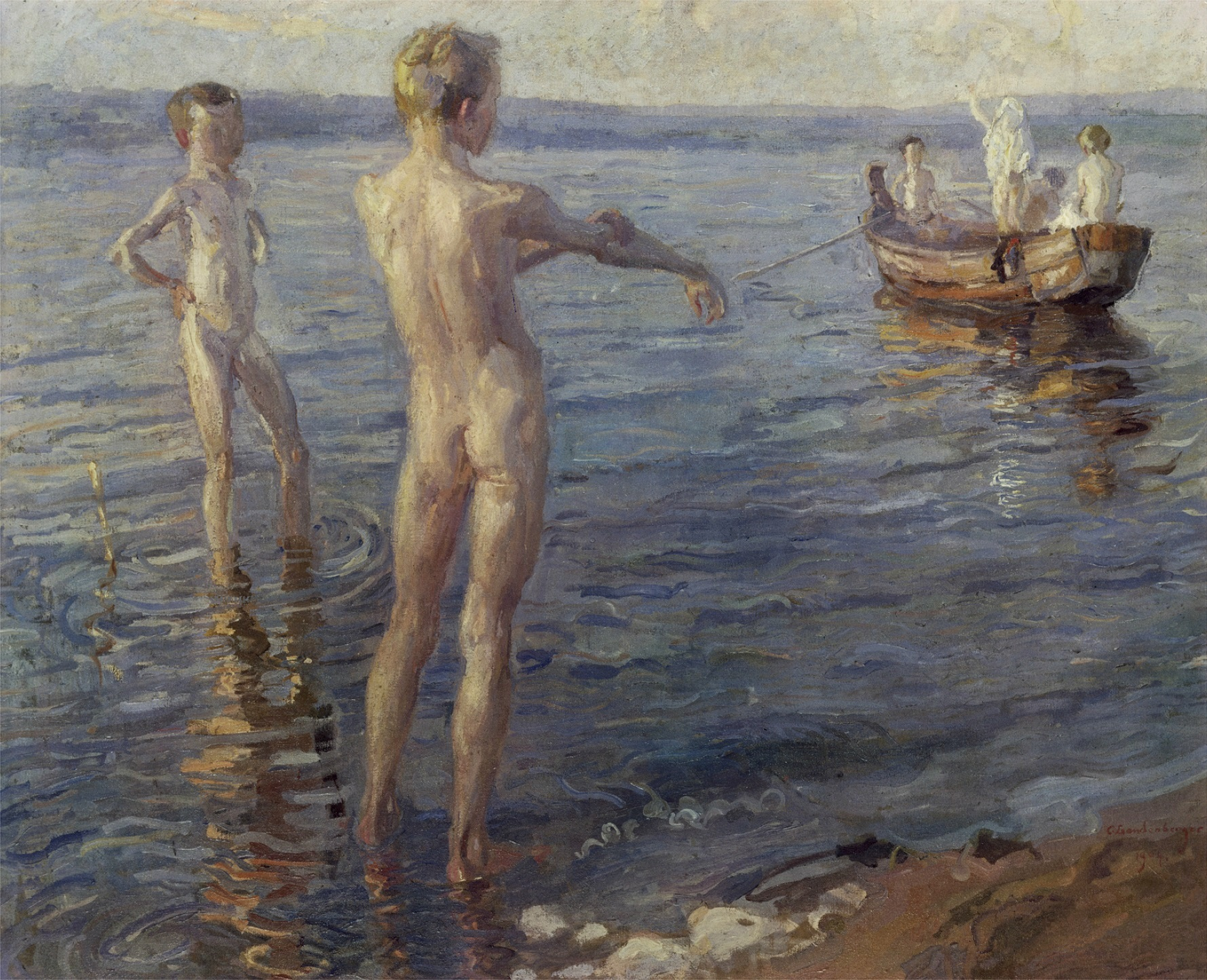
Summer Evening at the Lake (1904)

He was the second in a family of nine children. His parents operated a haulage business. He began his art studies at the Royal Art School of Stuttgart in 1879. From 1883 to 1887, he studied at the Academy of Fine Arts Munich, where he had his first exposure to the new ideas in art that were circulating there.

In 1890, he had his first public display at the Munich International Art Exhibition in the Glaspalast and, two years later, became one of the founding members of the Munich Secession. He exhibited regularly until 1916. In 1895, he started a private art school and taught drawing at the Munich Association of Women Artists from 1899 to 1905. At that time, he became a professor at the State Academy of Fine Arts in Stuttgart.

== Style and technique ==
At first, he created realistic canvases using a dark palette. After 1890, he used brighter colors with lighting effects and broad brushstrokes. He is considered to have been one of the pioneers of German plein-air painting. From 1893 to 1915, he worked on a themed series of paintings he called "Bathing Boys". His landscapes were accomplished in Norway and along the Dutch sea coast as well as in Southern Germany. After 1919, he began to produce etchings of a religious nature.

== Selected works ==
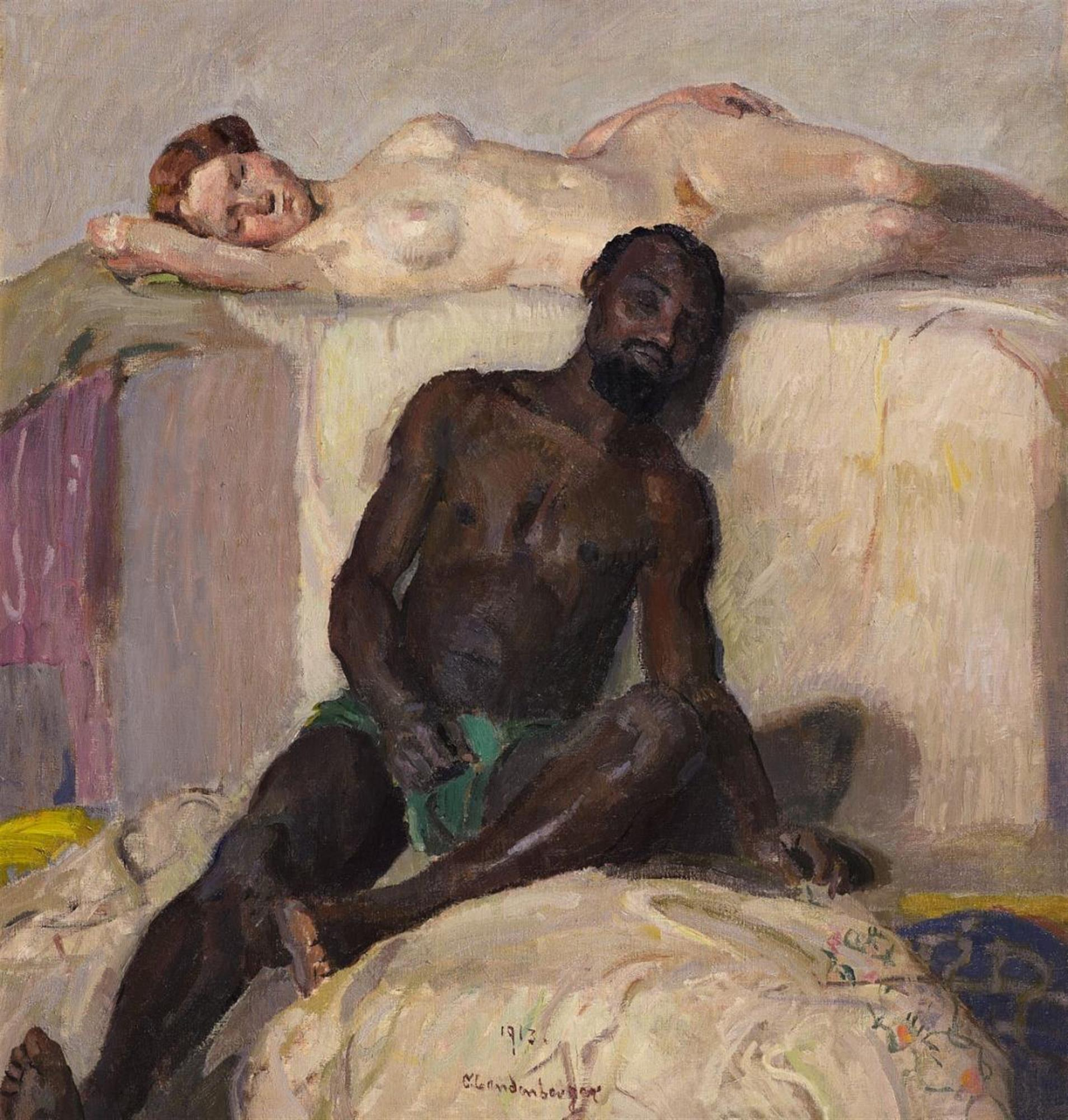
Harem Scene

The municipal art museum in Albstadt, Germany (Kunstmuseum Albstadt) has the largest collection of his work, with over 70 paintings, 200 drawings and 160 pages of print graphics.

- Nun ade, du stilles Haus (1897), Kunstmuseum Albstadt
- Portrait of Johannes Hartmann, the sculptor (1906/07)
- Dame an einem Kaffeetisch I (1911)
- Der Frühling (1910/13), Villa Haux, Albstadt-Ebingen
- Portrait of Brigitte Gussmann (1916)

== Sources and further reading ==
- Edeltraud Brockmüller: Christian Landenberger (1862-1927) in der Städtischen Galerie Albstadt. Ständige Ausstellung. Städtische Galerie Albstadt, Albstadt 1985, ISBN 3-923644-10-8
- Isabel Grüner: Impressionismus im deutschen Südwesten. Otto Reiniger, Hermann Pleuer, Heinrich von Zügel, Christian Landenberger. Kunststiftung Hohenkarpfen / Kunstverein Schwarzwald-Baar-Heuberg, Hausen ob Verena 1997, ISBN 3-930569-17-5
- Heinz Höfchen: Christian Landenberger (1862-1927). Studien zum Werk. Werkverzeichnis der Gemälde und der Druckgraphik. Dissertation, Universität Mainz 1983
- Heinz Höfchen: Christian Landenberger. Theiss, Stuttgart 1986, ISBN 3-8062-0446-2 (with Chronology)
- Eva Moser: Landschaft im Licht. Die Bodenseebilder Christian Landenbergers. In: Leben am See. Vol.IX (1991), ISBN 3-88812-509-X, S. 323–328
- Anne Peters (Ed.): Christian Landenberger. Zeichnungen. Städtische Galerie Albstadt, Albstadt 1993, ISBN 3-923644-51-5
