= Malesfelsen =

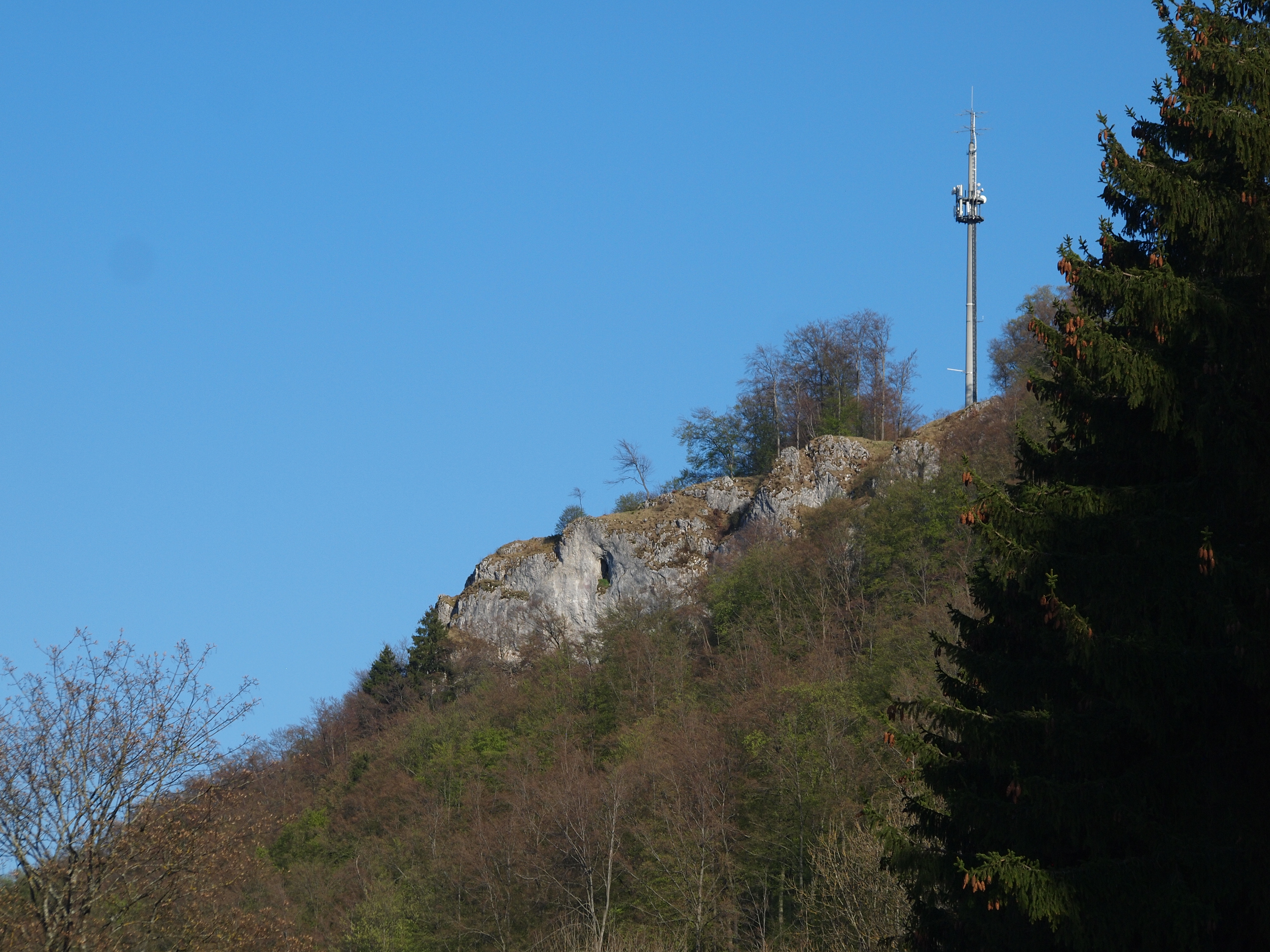
- Malesfelsen rock, seen from Riedhalde

Highest point
- Elevation: 884 m (2,900 ft)
- Coordinates: 48°12′10″N 9°2′9″E

Geography
- Location: Ebingen, Albstadt, Zollernalbkreis, Baden-Württemberg, Germany

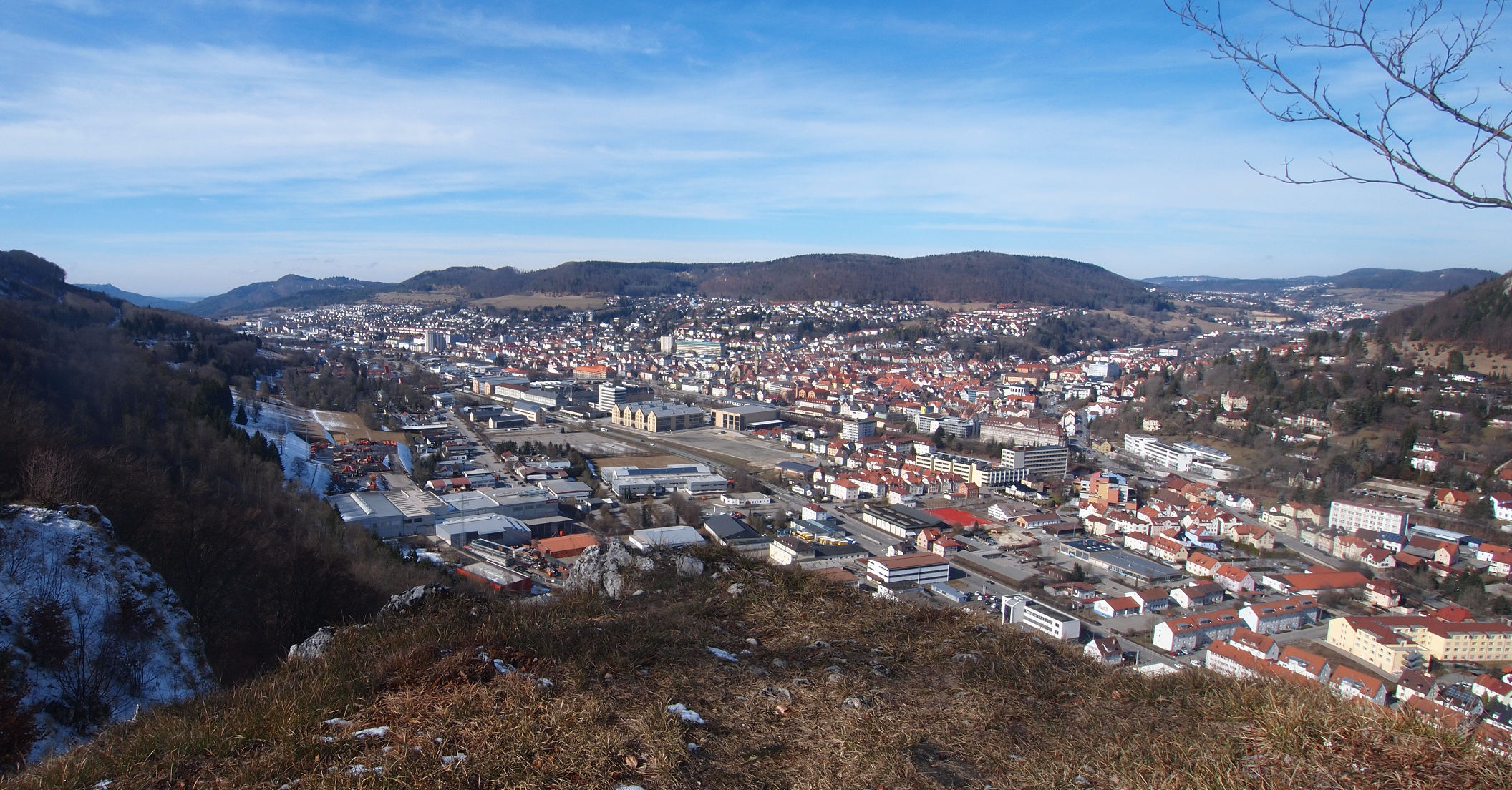
view from the rock down to Ebingen

Malesfelsen is a mountain of the Swabian Jura in Germany. It is located at the edge of the Großer Heuberg plateau above the Schmiecha valley in Albstadt.
