= Manfred Pahl =

German painter (1900–1994)

- Born: January 20, 1900; Ebingen
- Died: May 11, 1994 (aged 94); Stuttgart
- Occupations: Painter, draftsman and graphic artist

Manfred Pahl (January 20, 1900, in Ebingen – May 11, 1994, in Stuttgart) was a German painter, draftsman and graphic artist of Expressive Realism.

== Early life and works ==
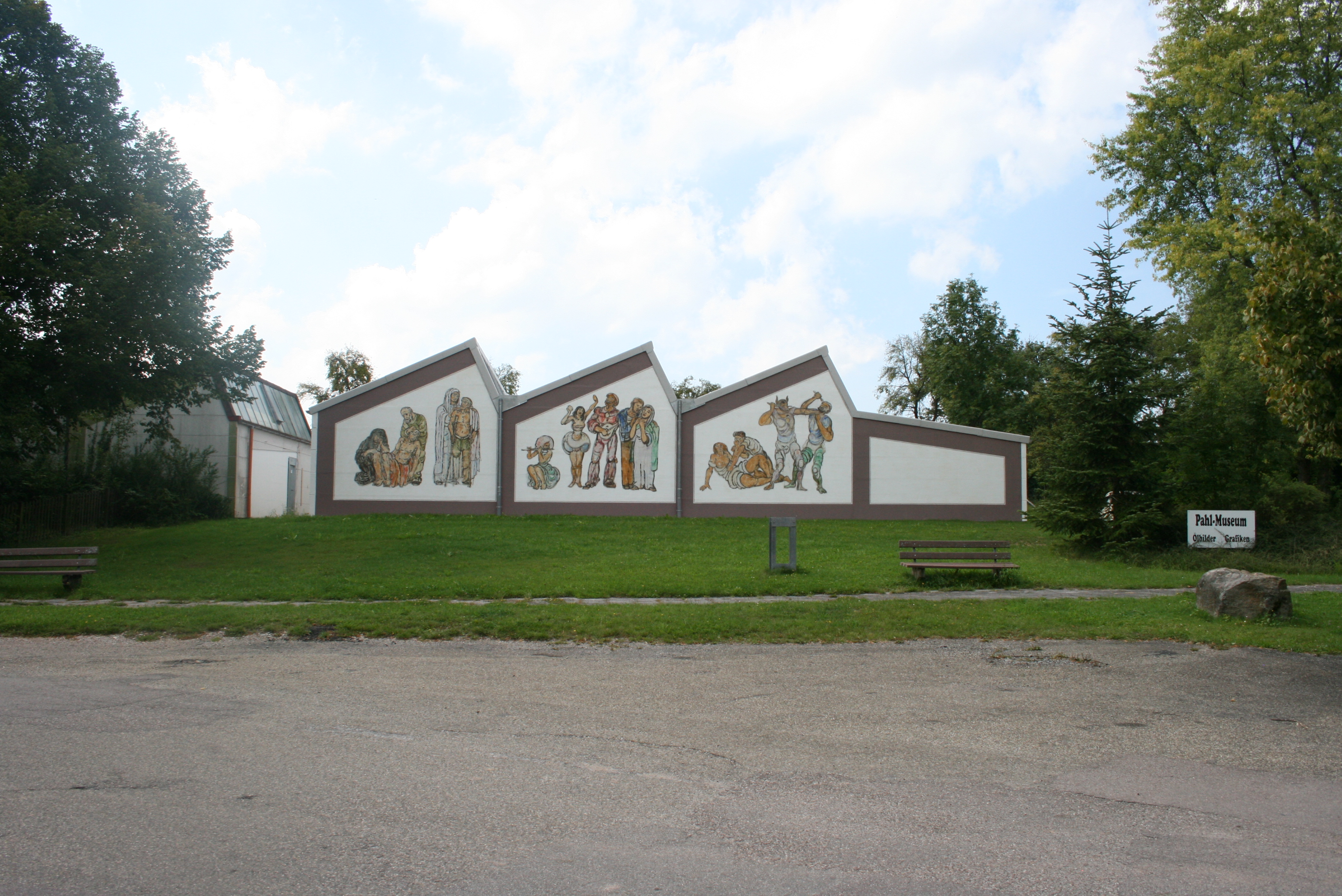
The Pahl-Museum in Mainhardt-Gailsbach

At the beginning of the 1920s, Pahl studied at the Academy of Fine Arts Stuttgart. He illustrated the 'fairytale of the Rhine and of the people' for Georg Engelbert Graf which was published in 1925.

In 1929, together with Manfred Henninger, Alfred Lehmann, Gustav Schopf, and Wilhelm Geyer, founded the Stuttgart New Secession. In addition to his painting (Tanzpaar, 1951) Pahl created a comprehensive graphic work. In the 1980s he created a museum of his work, the 'Pahl Museum' in Mainhardt-Gailsbach near Schwäbisch Hall.

== Personal life ==
He lived in Berlin until 1947.

== Honors ==
- 1973: Cross of Merit 1st Class of the Federal Republic of Germany
- 1981: Medal of Merit of the State of Baden-Württemberg

== Literature ==
- Günther Wirth: Art in the German Southwest from 1945 to the Present. Hatje, Stuttgart, 1982.
