= Hasana J. Hakenmüller =

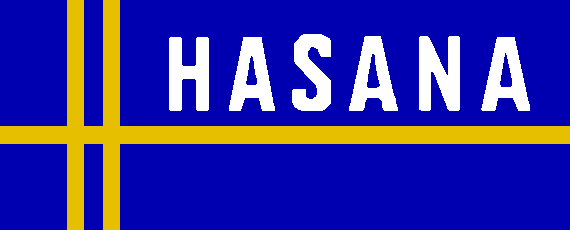
- Trade name: Hasana
- Industry: Textile
- Founded: December 1, 1887 in Albstadt-Tailfingen, Germany
- Founder: Johannes Hakenmüller
- Defunct: December 2000

Hasana J. Hakenmüller was a German textile company founded on 1. December 1887 in Albstadt-Tailfingen; it ceased operations in December 2000 Its brand name Hasana was concatenated from Hakenmüller and sana (Latin for healthy).

== History ==
=== Product history ===
In 1971 the German Football Association granted Hasana exclusive rights for children's sports- and leisure underwear sporting the logo of each of the 16 teams competing in Bundesliga, Germany's professional football league. This later led to similar exclusive rights to use the logo of 1974 FIFA World Cup on textiles.

== Architecture ==
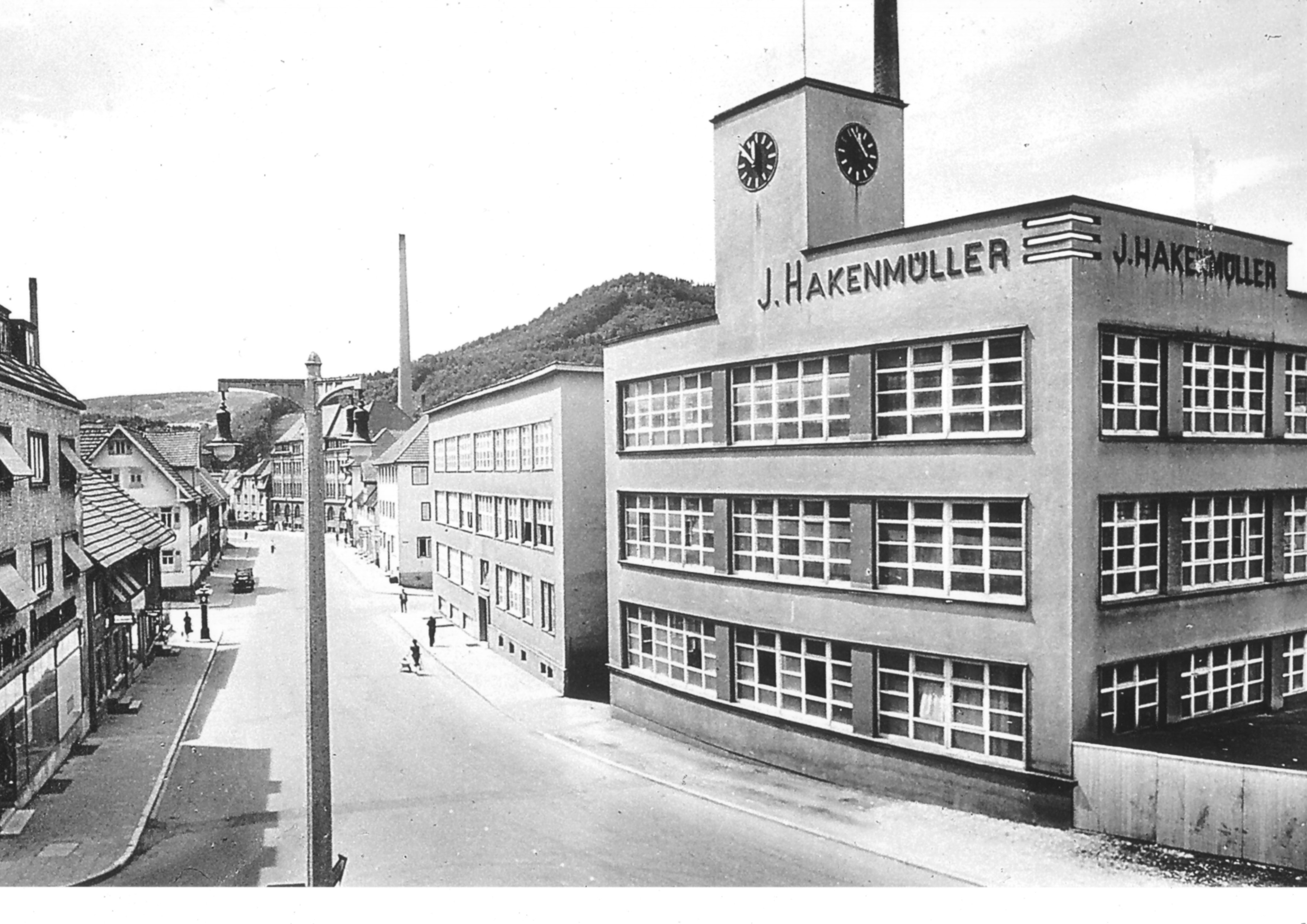
External view after 1937

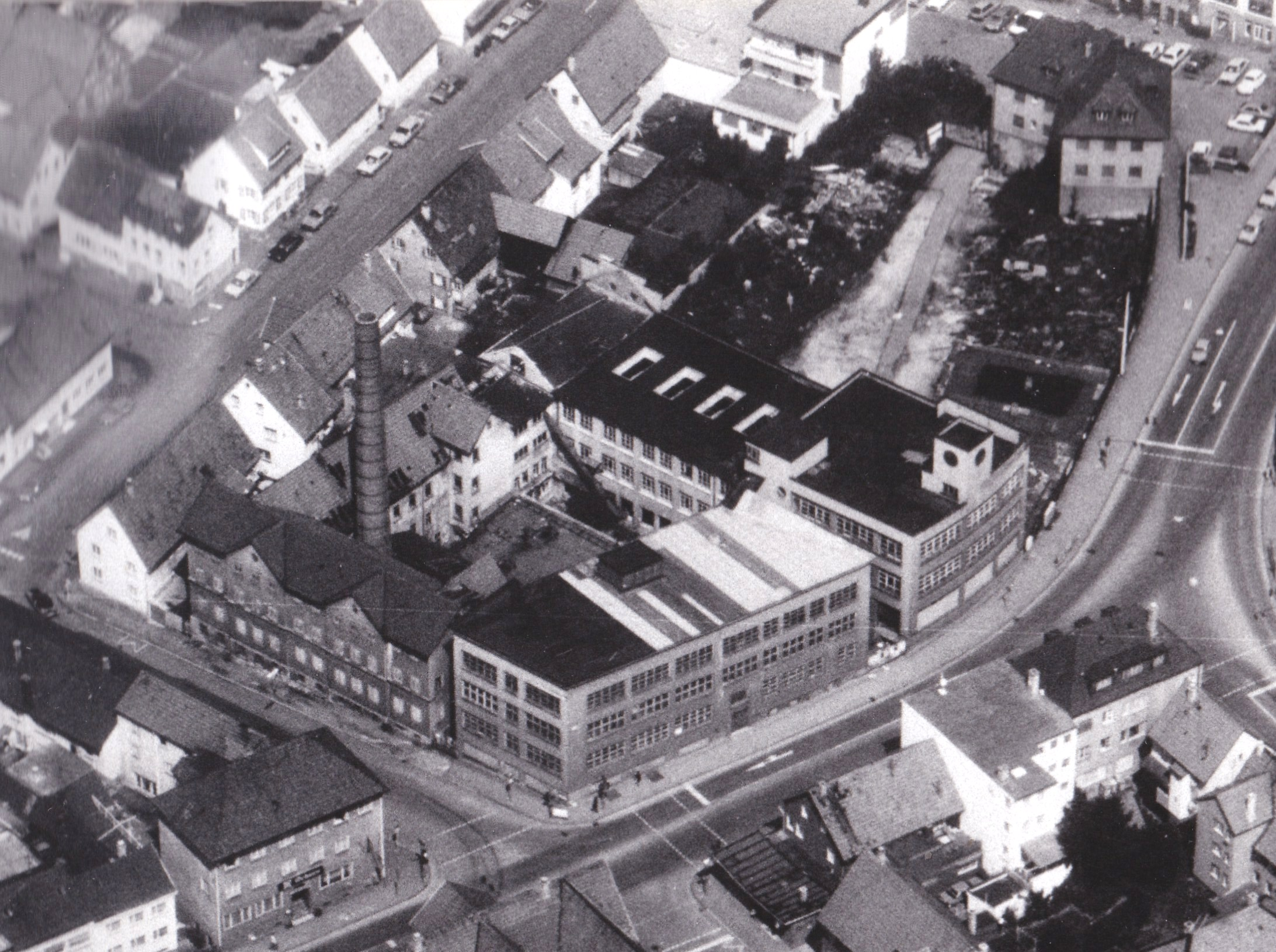
Aerial view

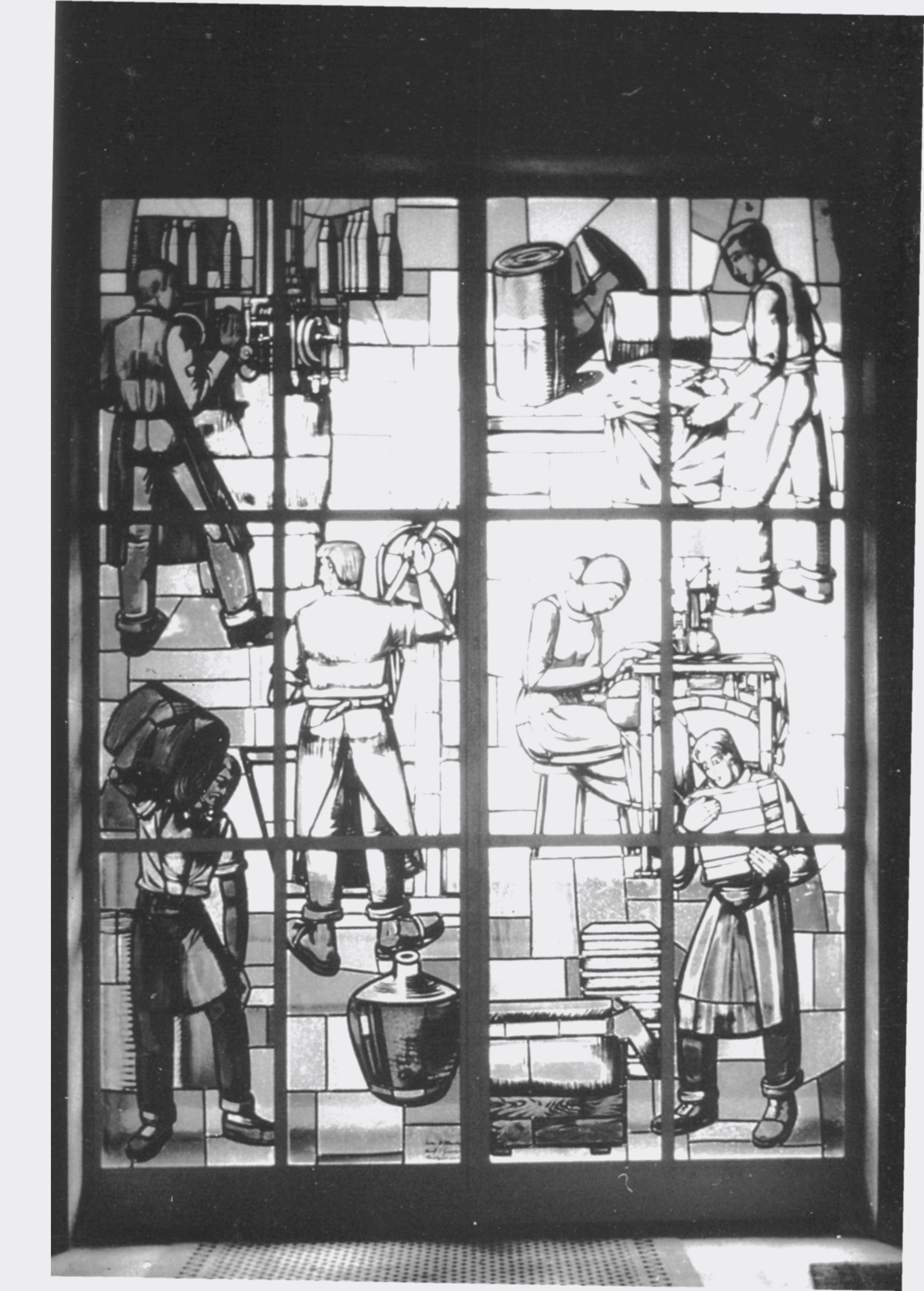
Stained glass window

== Product images ==
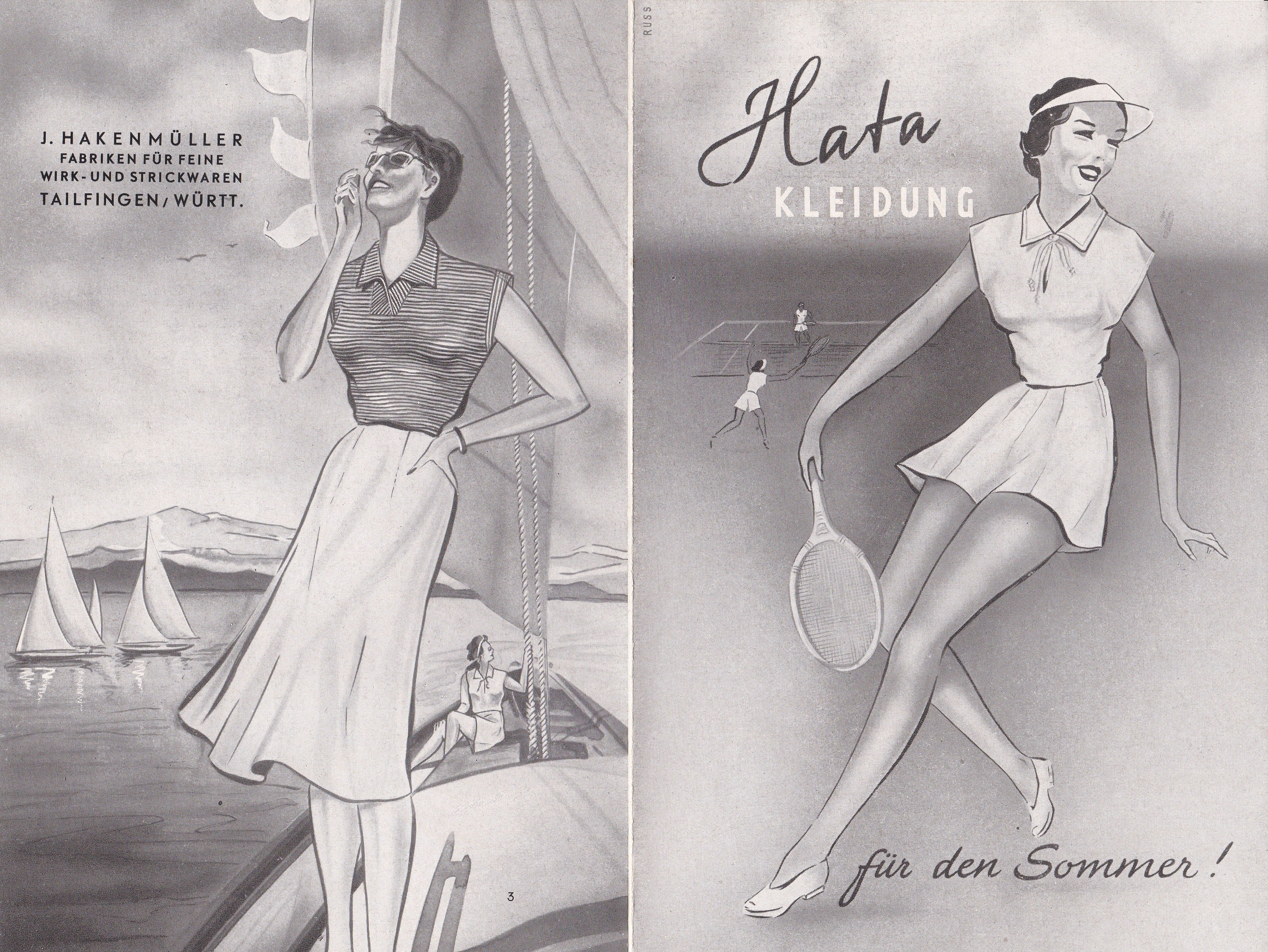
ca. 1950

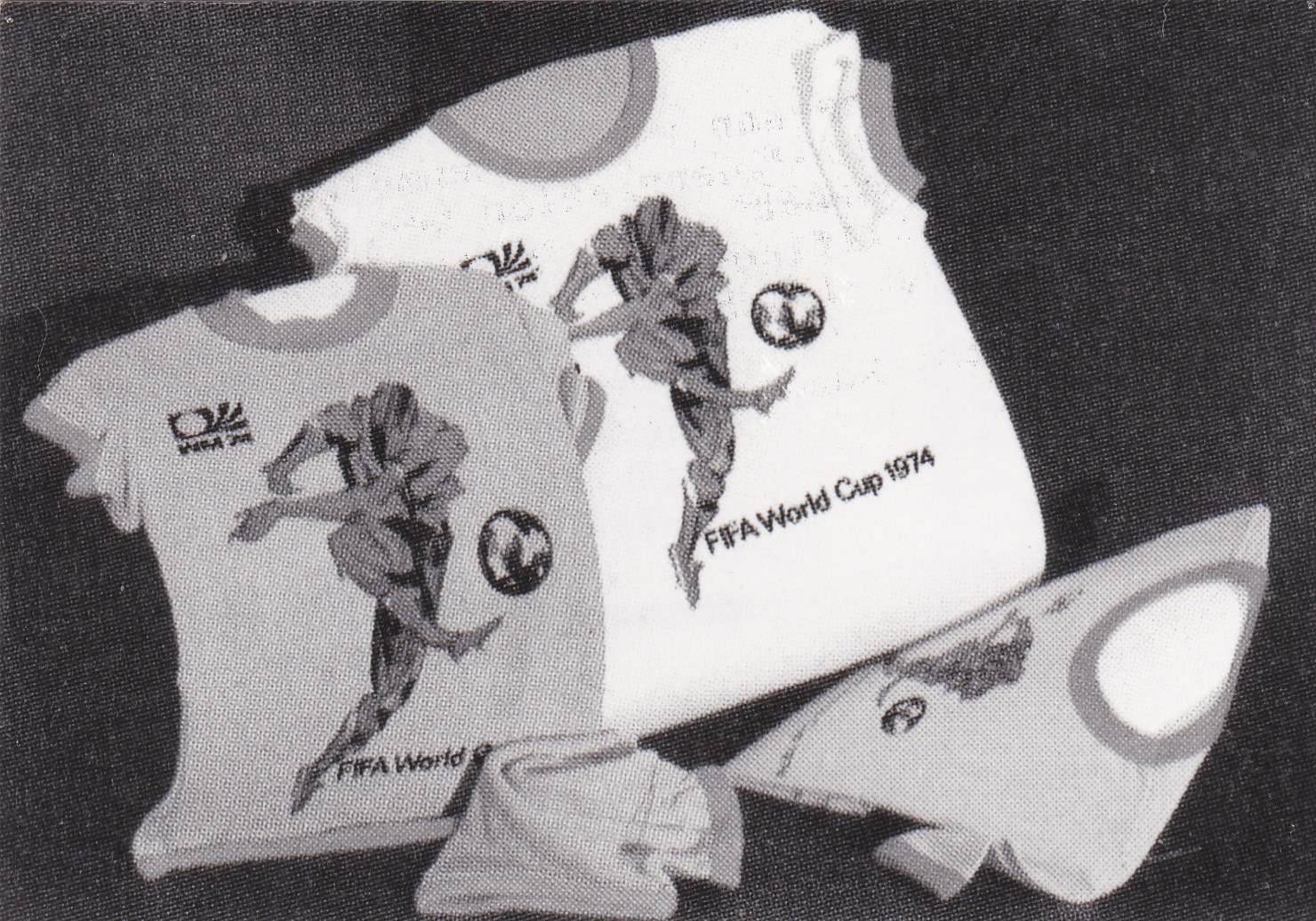
Design for 1974 FIFA World Cup
