= Schlossfelsen =

Coordinates: 48°13′04″N 9°02′09″E

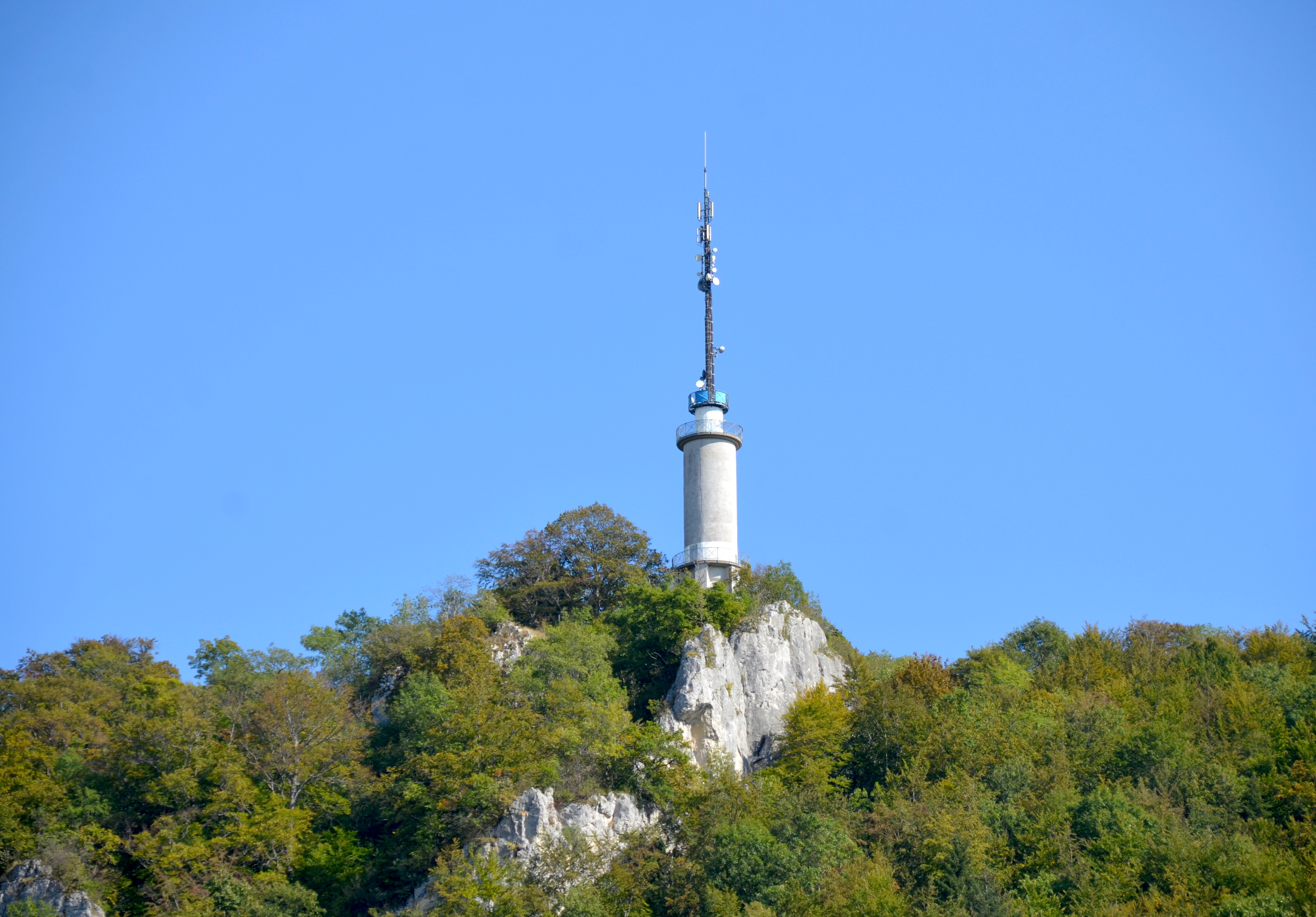
- Schlossfelsen Tower on top of Schlossfelsen

Highest point
- Elevation: 958 m (3,143 ft)

Naming
- English translation: Castle-Rock
- Language of name: German

Geography
- Location: Albstadt, Zollernalbkreis, Baden-Württemberg, Germany
- Parent range: Swabian Jura

Schlossfelsen is a mountain of Baden-Württemberg, Germany. It is located in Albstadt, Zollernalbkreis.

The mountain stands 958m above sea level (approximately 250m above Albstadt) and there is a 24m high observation tower Schlossfelsenturm near the summit.
