= Kern & Sohn =

Manufacturer of precision scales

Kern & Sohn GmbH
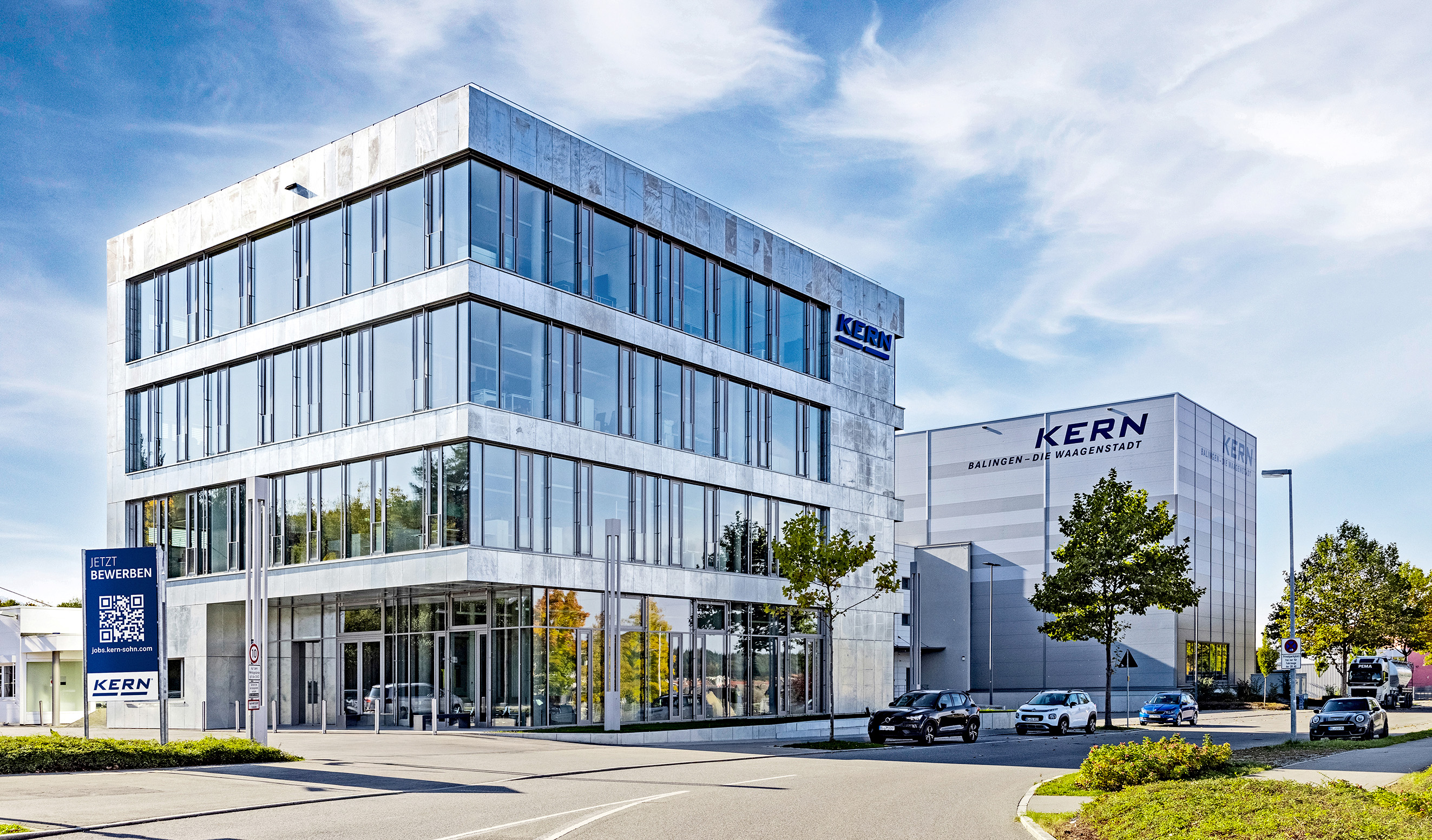
- Headquarters of KERN & SOHN in Balingen, Baden-Württemberg, Germany
- Industry: Scientific and precision measurement instruments
- Founded: 1844
- Headquarters: Balingen, Germany
- Key people: Albert Sauter
- Number of employees: 200 (2023)
- Website: www.kern-sohn.com

Kern & Sohn GmbH (stylized as KERN & SOHN GmbH) is a German manufacturer and distributor of precision scales, force gauges and microscopes, headquartered in Balingen, Baden-Württemberg, Germany. The company is considered a specialist in precision weighing technology. The company distributes its products through an international network and, according to its own information, is active in more than 90 countries worldwide.

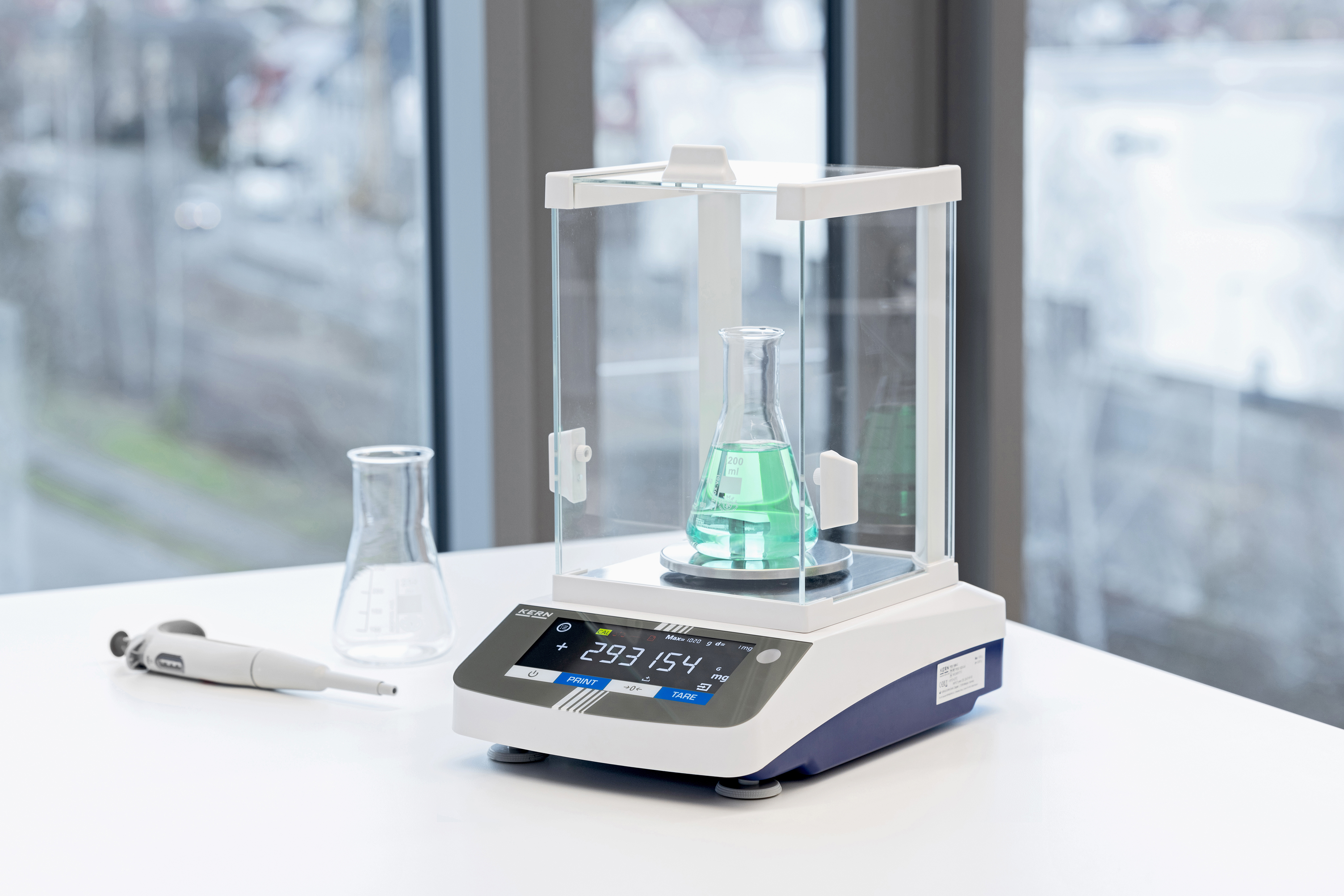
Analytical balance by Kern & Sohn in laboratory use

The company was founded in 1844 by Gottlieb Kern in Onstmettingen (now part of Albstadt), and its products are often referenced in nineteenth century international scientific publications.

The business is currently run by the eighth generation of the Kern family, and is one of only two German companies from that period to remain family-owned throughout its history (along with Bizerba). Many of the scales and balances produced by Kern are exhibited at the Waagenmuseum in Balingen.

Today, the company operates as a manufacturer of weighing technology, measuring instruments and optical instruments. In 2023, Kern & Sohn reported revenues of €44.4 million, an equity ratio of over 50 percent, and approximately 200 employees.

== History ==
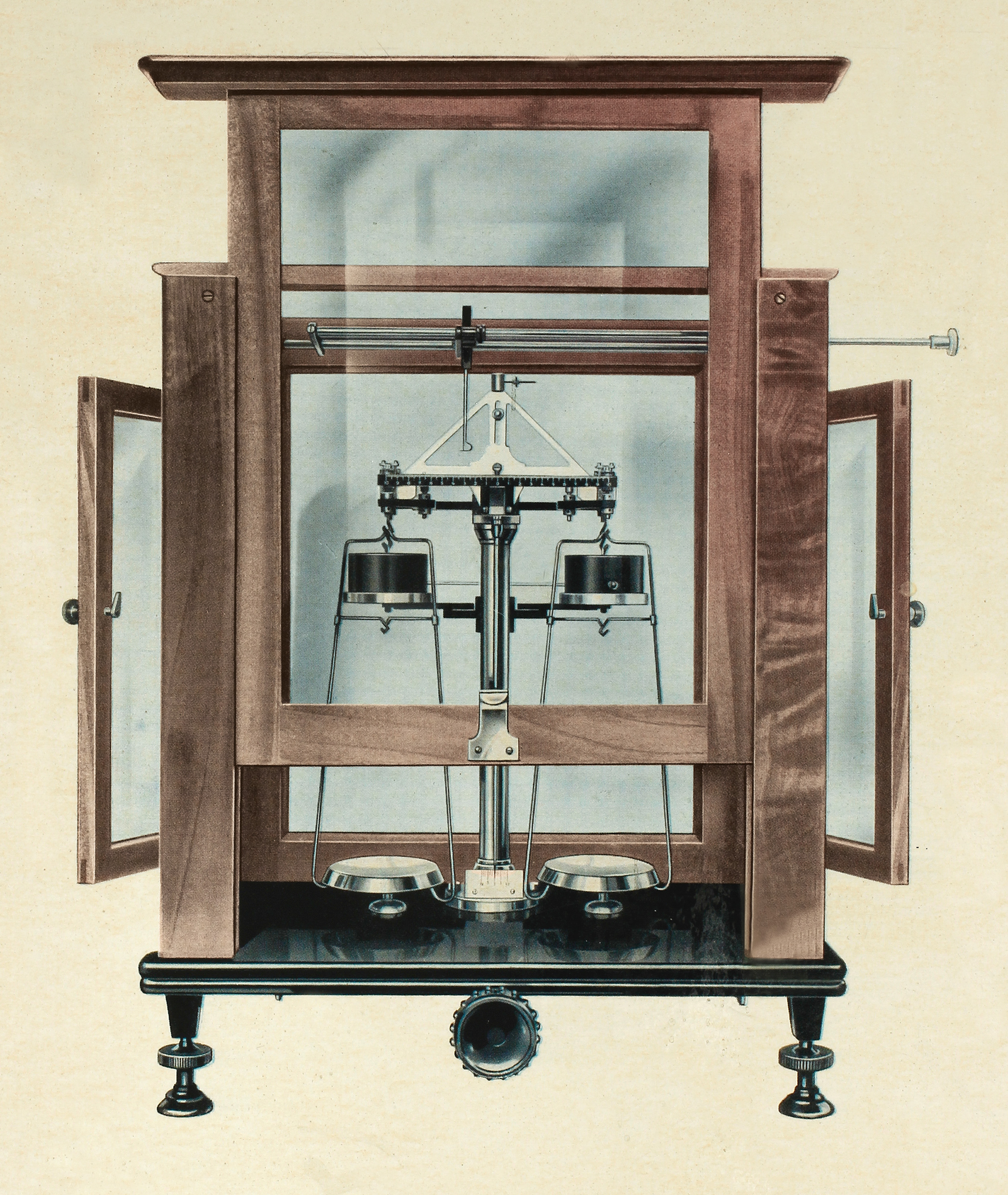
Analytical balance in a glass enclosure, Kern & Sohn catalogue, 1933

Gottlieb Kern belonged to a family of European artists and stonemasons. Kern & Sohn started in the midst of a recession but by 1867, the company was producing and selling around 2,000 balances a year to scientists, apothecaries, chemists and goldsmiths. In 1870, Albert Sauter, the step-son of Kern, joined the Kern & Sohn Board of Directors.

During the last quarter of the nineteenth century, Kern & Sohn introduced innovations and modifications into their designs to increase accuracy. In 1886, Gottlieb Kern died and Sauter became President of the company. The period was marked with expansion and technological development. By the turn of the century, Kern & Sohn held a dominant market position in a number of weight measurement fields. In 1903, Albert Sauter's son Gustav took over the company.

== Products ==
Kern & Sohn manufactures and distributes approximately 2,500 different weighing scales, industrial and medical weighing systems, used in laboratory, medical and industrial applications.

The product portfolio also comprises a broad range of measuring instruments. These include hygrometers, instruments for force measurement and torque measurement, devices for hardness testing and thickness measurement, light meters, sound level meters and optical instruments such as microscopes, refractometers and polarimeters.

In addition, the company develops software solutions for data acquisition and integration of weighing systems into IT environments, including the applications EasyTouch and BalanceConnection. These are used in particular for the automated acquisition, documentation and processing of measurement data and for integrating measuring devices into digital workflows.

The portfolio further includes calibration weights and related services such as calibration and verification of measuring instruments in accordance with Legal metrology regulations. The company operates an accredited calibration laboratory in accordance with ISO/IEC 17025 and is certified to ISO 9001 and ISO 13485 for medical weighing systems.. In addition, Kern & Sohn has obtained MDR certification for medical weighing systems in accordance with EU Regulation 2017/745.

== Distributors ==
Kern sells directly to end-users of precision scales and force gauges as well as distributors throughout the world.
