= Albstadt =

- Town
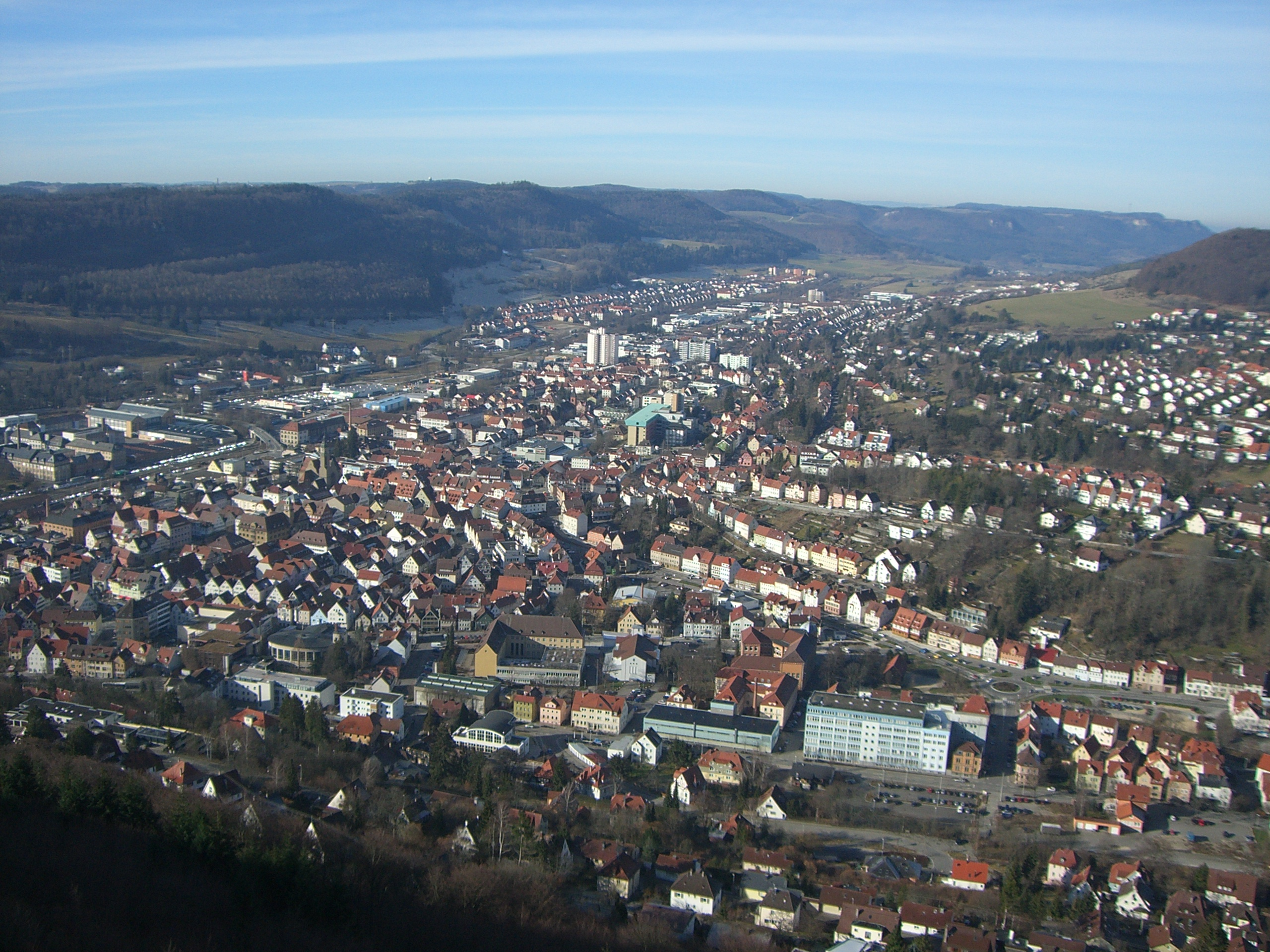
- A view of Ebingen

- Coat of arms

- Location of Albstadt within Zollernalbkreis district
- Interactive map of Albstadt
- Location within Germany Location within Baden-Württemberg
- Coordinates: 48°12′43″N 09°01′26″E
- Country: Germany
- State: Baden-Württemberg
- Admin. region: Tübingen
- District: Zollernalbkreis

Government
  - Mayor (2023–31): Roland Tralmer (CDU)

Area
  - Total: 134.4 km^{2} (51.9 sq mi)
- Elevation: 731 m (2,398 ft)

Population (2025-12-31)
  - Total: 47,047
  - Density: 350.1/km^{2} (906.6/sq mi)
- Time zone: UTC+01:00 (CET)
  - Summer (DST): UTC+02:00 (CEST)
- Postal codes: 72421–72461
- Dialling codes: 07431, 07432, 07435
- Vehicle registration: BL
- Website: www.albstadt.de

Albstadt (German pronunciation: [ˈalpʃtat]) is the largest city in the district of Zollernalbkreis in Baden-Württemberg, Germany. It is located on the Swabian Jura mountains, about halfway between Stuttgart and Lake Constance.

== Geography ==
Albstadt is spread across a variety of hills and valleys, its elevation ranges between 614 m (2,014 ft) above sea level and 966 m (3,169 ft). One valley is the river Schmiecha, a left-hand tributary of the Danube, a second valley is the river of upper Eyach, a tributary of the Neckar.

To Albstadt belongs also the Raichberg hill in the north, on which there is the Raichberg Transmitter and an observation tower located. South of Albstadt is the Heuberg Military Training Area.

== History ==
Settlement in the region dates back to at least the Iron Age. A Hallstatt cemetery in Albstadt was excavated by amateur archaeologists in the late nineteenth century and revealed a wide range of pottery and metal artefacts. Known as the 'Degerfeld Barrow' cemetery, a substantial collection was built up by the local antiquary Hyronimus Edelmann that was eventually deposited in the British Museum.

On November 16, 1911, Albstadt was hit by a M_{s} 6.1 earthquake, particularly affecting the areas of Tailfingen, Lautlingen and Margrethausen. There was high property damage, but there were no fatalities. Thousands of buildings, including landmarks, were damaged, some of them irreparably. The earthquake also resulted in landslides, which caused additional property damage. It is the second most powerful earthquake recorded in Germany, after the 1756 Düren earthquake.

On May 28, 1943, Albstadt was hit by a M_{s} 5.6 earthquake, again affecting the areas of Tailfingen, Lautlingen and Margrethausen. There was again high property damage on thousands of buildings, but there were no fatalities.

During World War II, a heavy bombing raid was carried out on Albstadt on July 11, 1944, which killed 65 people and another one on February 20, 1945, which killed 19 people. In April 1945, the French moved in, and Albstadt, as part of the newly created state of Württemberg-Hohenzollern, was subsequently part of their occupation zone until 1949.

On September 3, 1978, Albstadt was hit by a M_{s} 5.7 earthquake (de), which caused high property damage but no fatalities. 6850 buildings were damaged, some of them irreparably. The cost of the damage amounted to 275 million Deutsche Mark, which is the costliest earthquake in Germany to date.

== Religion ==
The following religions are present in Albstadt:

- Roman Catholic Church
- YMCA Tailfingen
- Evangelische Landeskirche in Württemberg
- New Apostolic Church in Tailfingen
- Gospel Forum in Ebingen
- Pauluskirche, United Methodist Church parish in Ebingen
- Versammlung of the Brüderbewegung in the Johanneskirche, John Nelson DarbyTailfingen
- Gemeinschaftsstunde Süddeutsche Gemeinschaft, Liebenzell Mission, Evangelischer Gnadauer Gemeinschaftsverband not allowed in the Protestant church in Truchtelfingen and Tailfingen
- Russian Orthodox Church in Tailfingen Schlossstaße Tailfingen. Servie in Balingen Siechenkirche and Meßstetten Lamprechtskirche
- TOS
- Gemeinde Gottes
- Adventisten

== Economy and Infrastructure ==
Most of the textiles industry (among them Hasana J. Hakenmüller) is gone today, leaving some monuments, like Villa Haux. However, one of the world's biggest makers of industrial needles, Groz-Beckert, is still based in the town. Other prominent local companies include Mey (knitwear), Mettler Toledo (weighing systems) and a major part of Assa Abloy security systems (Eff-Eff Brand). Ebingen also hosts the technical and computer science faculties of Albstadt-Sigmaringen University with about 3,000 students (2014).

=== Education ===
Albstadt presides over its own modern school system, with elementary through high school provided all within the same city, including Kindergartens and boarding schools for the mentally and physically challenged. Also, the city library offers free internet access to residents.

==== University ====
The university was founded in 1971 and has two campus locations, Albstadt and Sigmaringen.

==== Sport school ====
In Baden Württemberg training of a sports team or athlete, called Übungsleiter C, is in Tailfingen, Landessportschule Langenwand, as well a hotel with 120 beds.

=== Mining ===
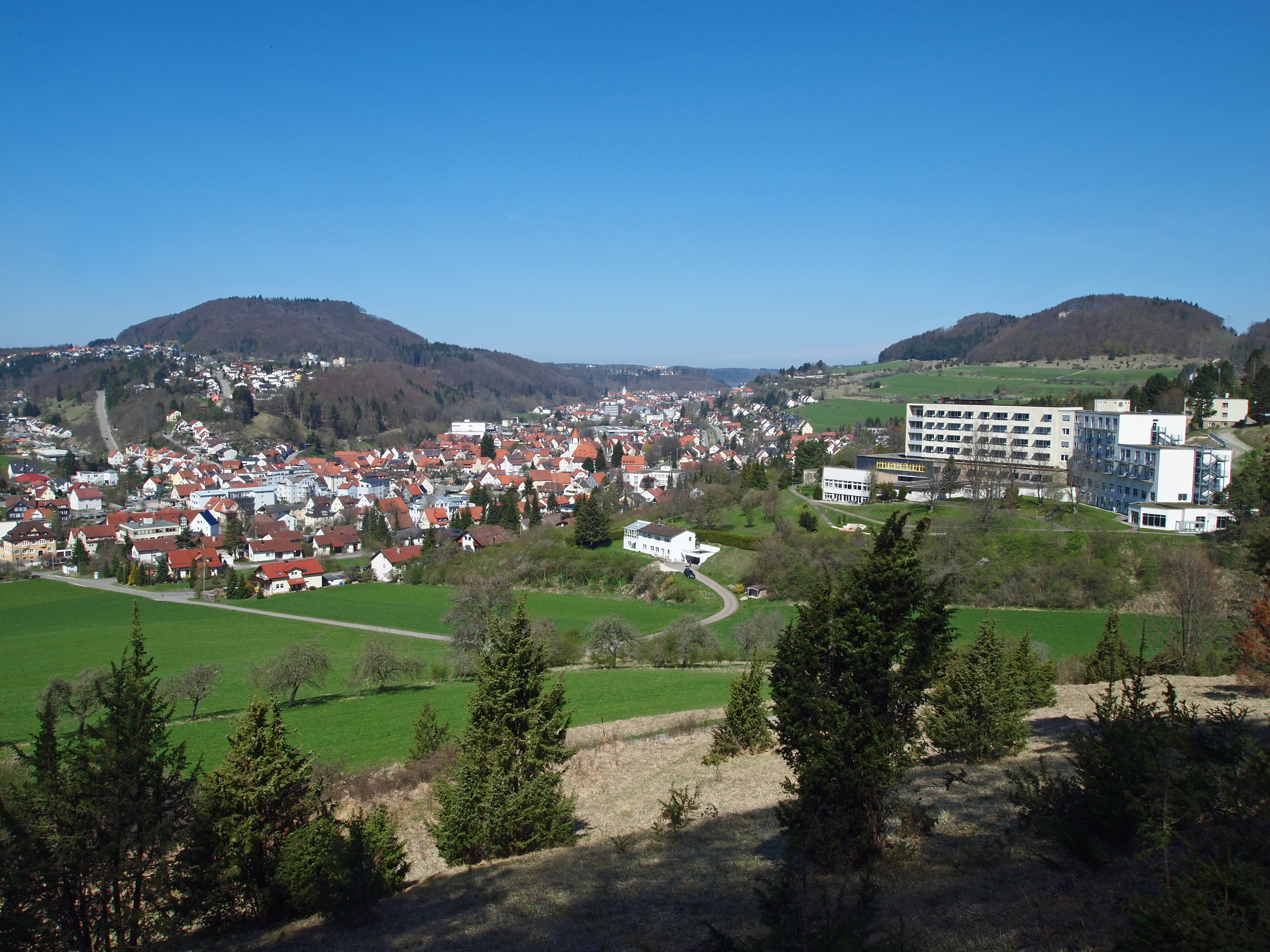
Truchtelfingen and Tailfingen

In former times iron ore was produced in Albstadt. Fidel Eppler was the name of the mine-inspector. The buttress wood was bought in Truchtelfingen and used from Lautlinger Knappen at the Hörnle area . From an old 3,5 km mine in a Doggererzflöz in Weilheim is wood in the Tuttlinger Fruchtkasten . Steel was produced in Tuttlingen by the Schwäbische Hüttenwerke in Ludwigstal, today iron brakes.

=== Sports ===
In the city of Ebingen and Tailfingen, there is a Soccer stadium complex.

The YMCA do Handball, indiaca, Soccer, and natural sports in Halls and the Sportgelände Markenberg YMCA.

== Districts ==
The districts Ebingen, Laufen, Lautlingen, Pfeffingen und Tailfingen were first mentioned in 793 in a document of the abbey St. Gallen. Ebingen received city rights around 1250 from the Hohenberg ducal family.

Albstadt consists of the following urban districts, which had been independent towns and merged to form Albstadt in 1975:

Coat of Arms	Coat of Arms	Coat of Arms	Coat of Arms	Coat of Arms	Coat of Arms	Coat of Arms	Coat of Arms	Coat of Arms	Coat of Arms
District	Ebingen	Tailfingen (Albstadt)	Onstmettingen	Truchtelfingen	Pfeffingen (Albstadt)	Lautlingen (Albstadt)	Laufen (Albstadt)	Margrethausen	Burgfelden
Population (2006)	19,618	12,234	5,384	3,229	2,168	1,998	1,753	1,084	345
Population (2007)	19,339	12,091	5,314	3,223	2,131	1,987	1,753	1,087	338
Population (2008)	19,265	12,072	5,260	3,189	2,147	1,988	1,777	1,069	346
Population (2009)	19,196	11,895	5,194	3,210	2,074	1,942	1,764	1,046	382
Population (2010)	18,718	11,522	5,006	3,101	2,144	1,833	1,709	1,023	364
Population (2011)	18,584	11,500	4,957	3,108	2,048	1,821	1,699	1,025	361
Population (2012)	18,478	11,329	4,900	3,028	1,993	1,771	1,699	997	314
Population (2014)	18,675	11,208	4,903	3,035	1,982	1,808	1,664	967	336

== Population ==
- 1975: 50,772
- 1987: 46,369
- 1995: 49,463
- 2005: 46,505
- 2015: 44,431

== Lord Mayors of Albstadt ==
- 1975–1991: Hans Pfarr (CDU)
- 1991–1999: Hans-Martin Haller (SPD)
- 1999–2015: Jürgen Gneveckow (CDU)
- since 2015: Klaus Konzelmann (Free voters Baden-Württemberg)

== Notable people ==
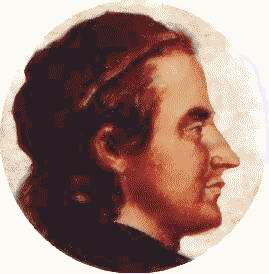
Philipp Matthäus Hahn

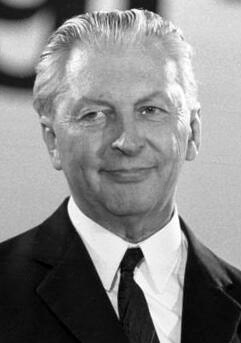
Kurt Georg Kiesinger, 1969)

- Philipp Matthäus Hahn (1739–1790), pastor, designer and inventor, lived in Onstmettingen in 1764–1770
- Ignaz Anton Demeter (1773–1842), Roman Catholic priest, Archbishop of Freiburg im Breisgau, 1836–1842
- Otto Hahn (1879–1968), chemist, nuclear scientist, won the Nobel Prize in Chemistry in 1944. researched locally.
- Kurt Georg Kiesinger (1904–1988), lawyer and politician (CDU), Prime Minister of Baden-Württemberg (1958–1966) and Chancellor (1966–1969)
- Berthold Schenk Graf von Stauffenberg (1905–1944), jurist, participant in the assassination attempt on Adolf Hitler; grew up in Lautlingen
- Claus von Stauffenberg (1907–1944), officer, attempted assassin of Adolf Hitler; grew up in Lautlingen
- Gregor Dorfmeister (1929–2018), journalist and writer, born in Tailfingen
- Monika Herzig (born 1964), jazz musician and musicologist
- Thomas Bareiß (born 1975), politician (CDU) and former Govt. minister

=== Sport ===
- Martin Schaudt (born 1958), dressage rider, gold medallist at the 1996 & 2004 Summer Olympics
- Marcus Klausmann (born 1977), former downhill mountain biker, multiple winner of the German Championships
- Roberto Floriano (born 1986), an Italian retired footballer who played over 440 games
- Kevin Dicklhuber (born 1989), footballer who has played over 330 games
- Marcel Heister (born 1992), footballer who has played about 300 games

== Twin towns – sister cities ==
Albstadt is twinned with:

- Chambéry, France

== See also ==
- Kern & Sohn (1844)
- Schlossfelsen
