= Villa Haux =

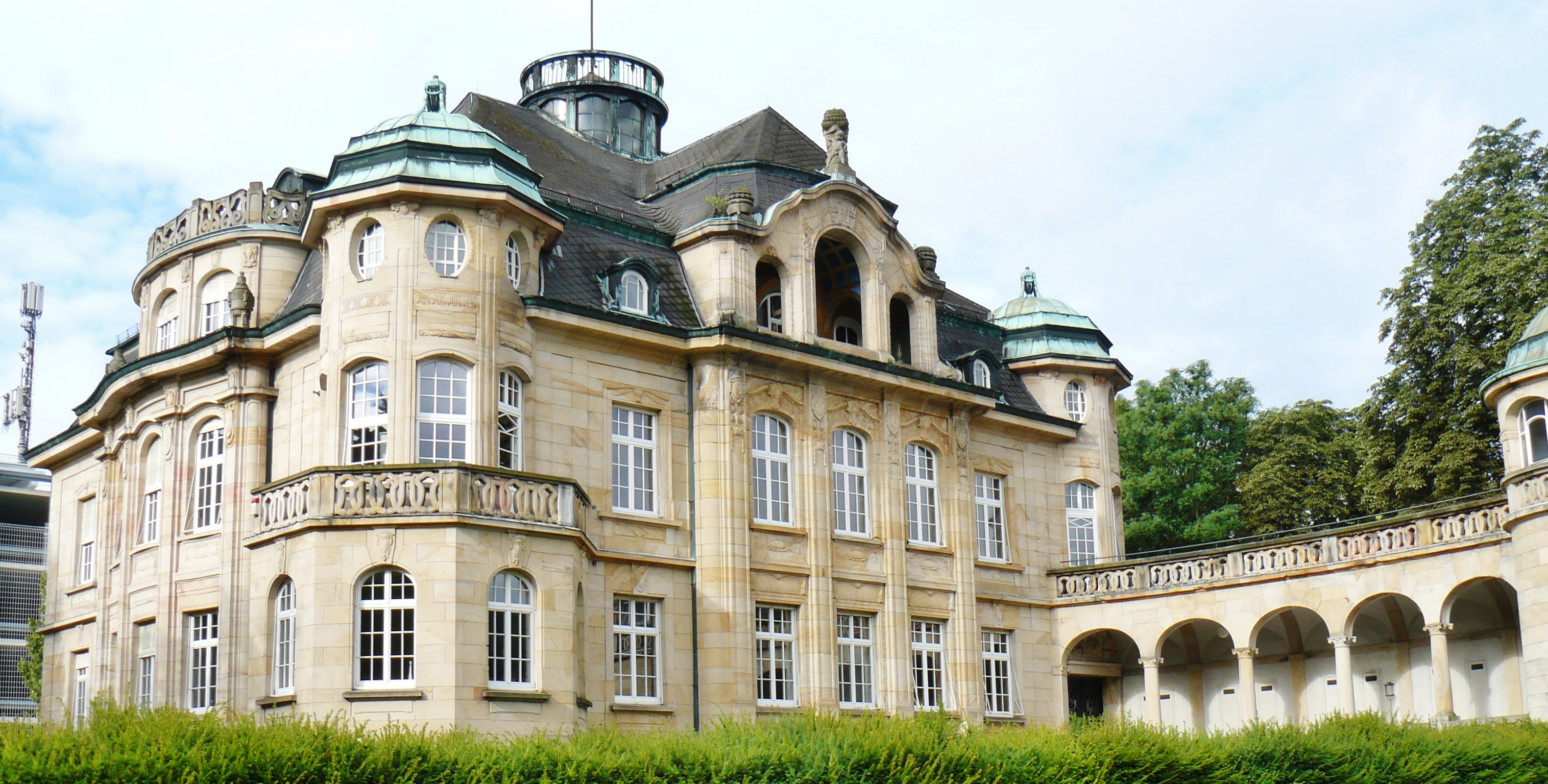
New Villa Haux

Villa Haux is a villa in the Art Nouveau style built in 1908 by architects Richard Böklen and Carl Feil in the southern German town of Ebingen.

It was built for Kommerzienrat Friedrich Haux (1860–1929), entrepreneur in the local textile industry, between his factory and a railway line crossing the town on a bridge.

Translocation

His previous residence and office, built as functional timber-framing house in 1885 on the same place and just decorated neo-baroque in 1898, was relocated across a street.

The new villa was equipped with most modern installations, such as elevator, central heating and central vacuum cleaner.

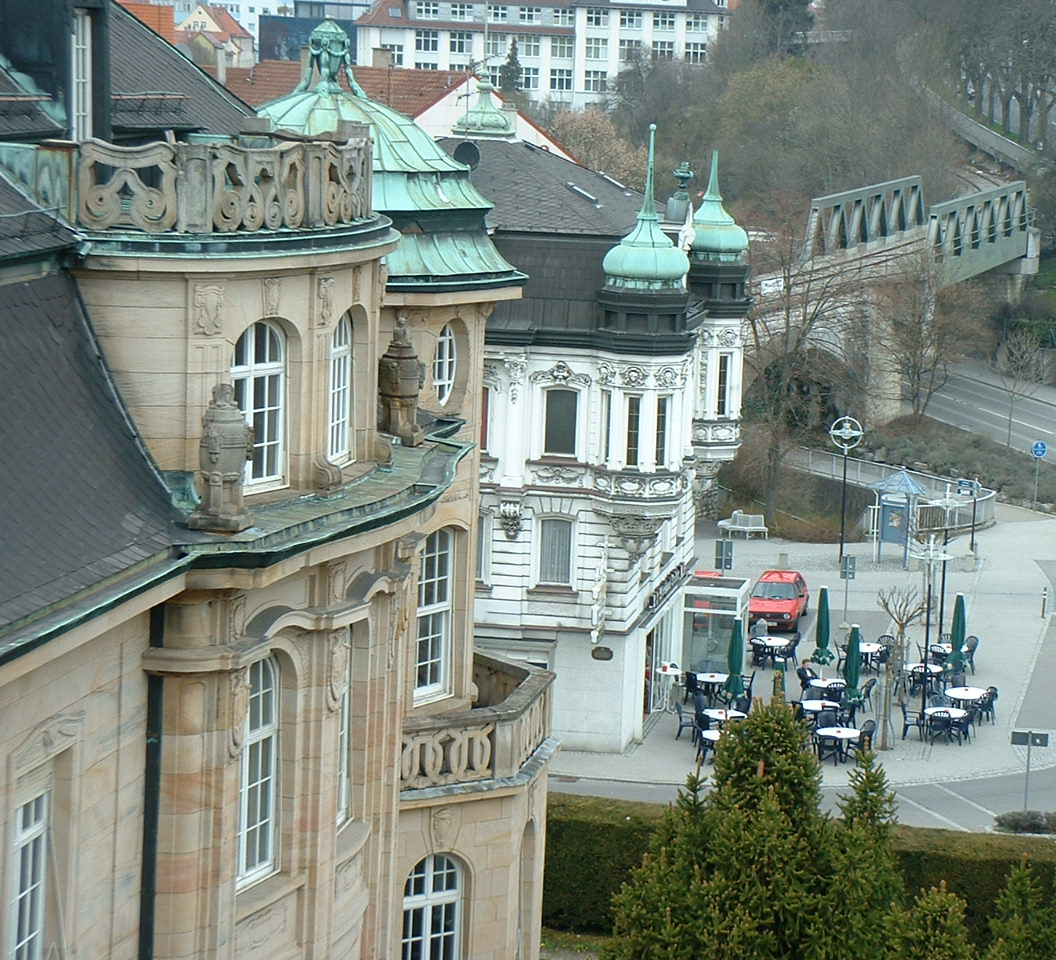
New and old Villa, 2005

The Haux family lived in the houses until 1954. Afterwards, the new villa was used for their business and rented to various users. From 1978 it was empty. In 1991 a new owner started renovating it. Today the Klaiber-Schlegel tax advisor society owns and uses it. Some rooms are available for cultural events.

In the old villa, there was a pharmacy from 1964 until 1991. Since then it is a pub. The railway is abandoned.
