= Ebingen =

Town in Albstadt, Baden-Württemberg, Germany

Coordinates: 48°12′44″N 9°01′36″E

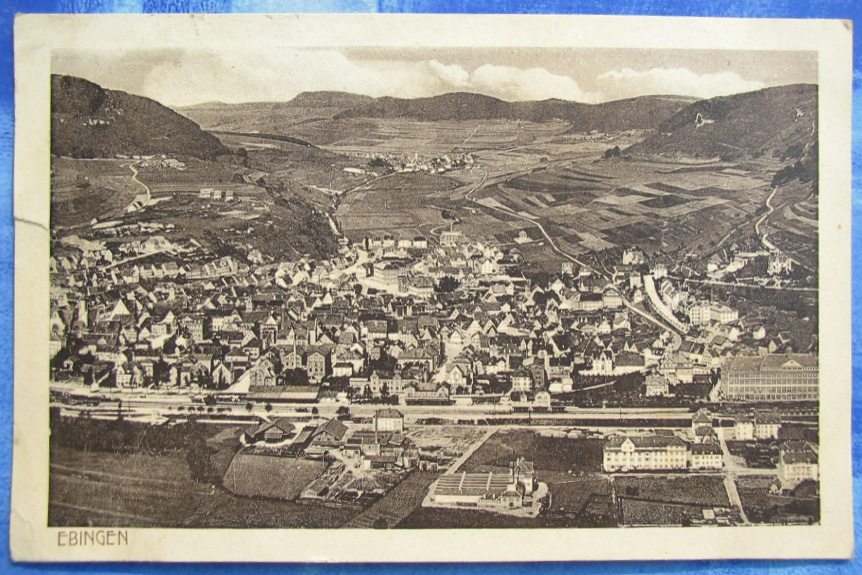
1917

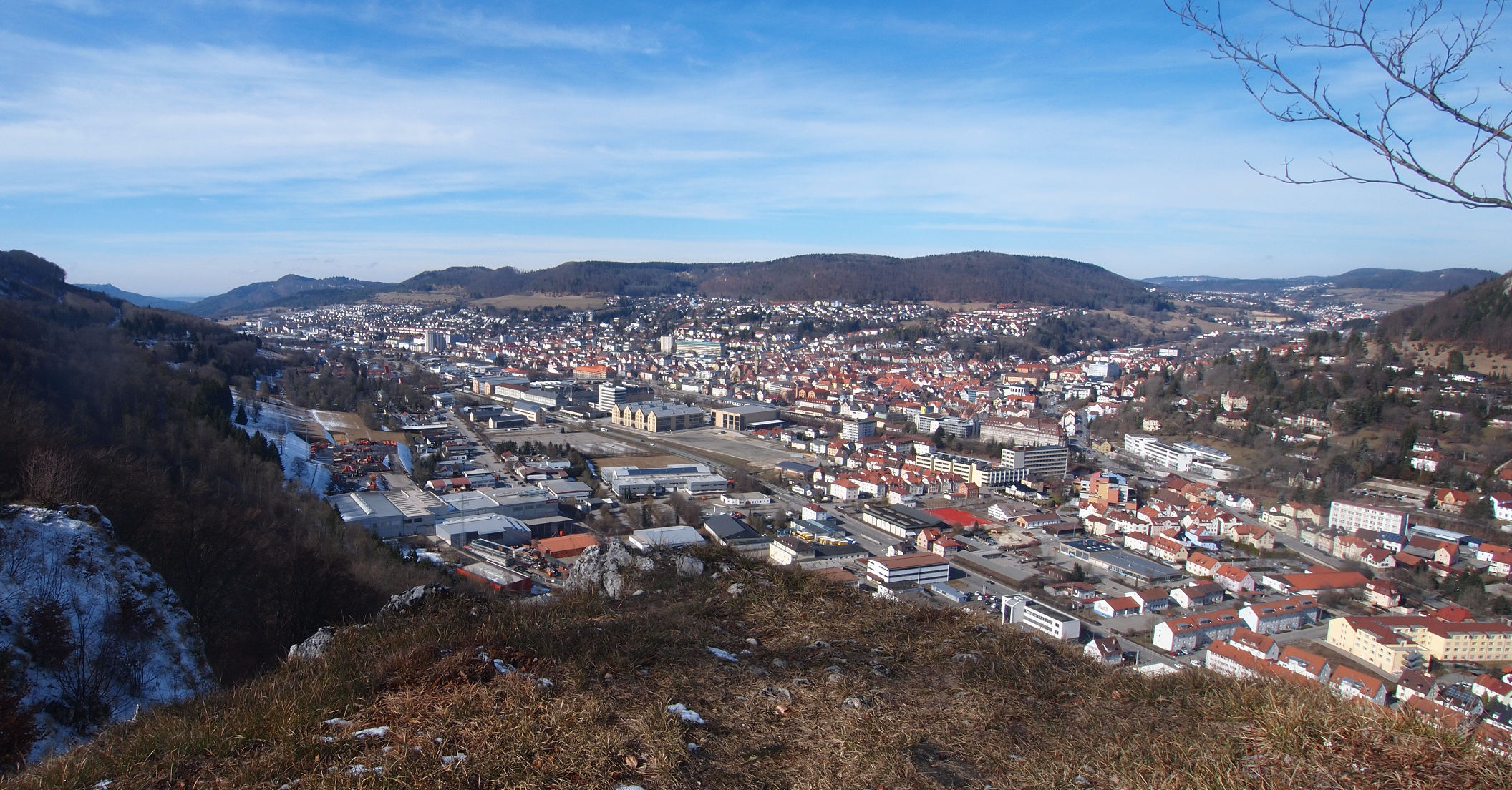
2017, seen from Malesfelsen

Ebingen is a town in the large district of Albstadt, district Zollernalbkreis, in the German state of Baden-Württemberg. It is located on the river Schmiecha, a left-hand tributary of the Danube, south of Tübingen and west of Ulm.

== History ==
Ebingen received city rights around 1250 from the Hohenberg ducal family. In 1367 it became a part of the kingdom of Württemberg. In the early 20th century, it was known for manufacturing velvet and velveteen (cotton-velvet), "Manchester" goods, stockings, stays, hats, needles, tools and tanneries. During World War II, the war itself only came on July 11, 1944, with a bombing raid on Ebingen, which killed 65 people and destroyed 37 houses in the city center. On April 18, 1945, the train station became the target of another bombing raid. When an ammunition train was fired upon, the ammunition exploded and devastated the area around the train station. In 1975 Ebingen joined 8 other towns in the area to form the city of Albstadt. Current population is at 18,700, with all of Albstadt having around 45,000 inhabitants.

== Economy ==
Most of the textiles industry is gone today, leaving some monuments, like Villa Haux. However, one of the world's biggest makers of industrial needles, Groz-Beckert still resides there. Other prominent local companies include Mey (knitwear), Mettler Toledo (weighing systems) and a major part of Assa Abloy security systems (Eff-Eff Brand). Ebingen also hosts the technical and computer science faculties of Albstadt-Sigmaringen University with about 3,000 students (2014).

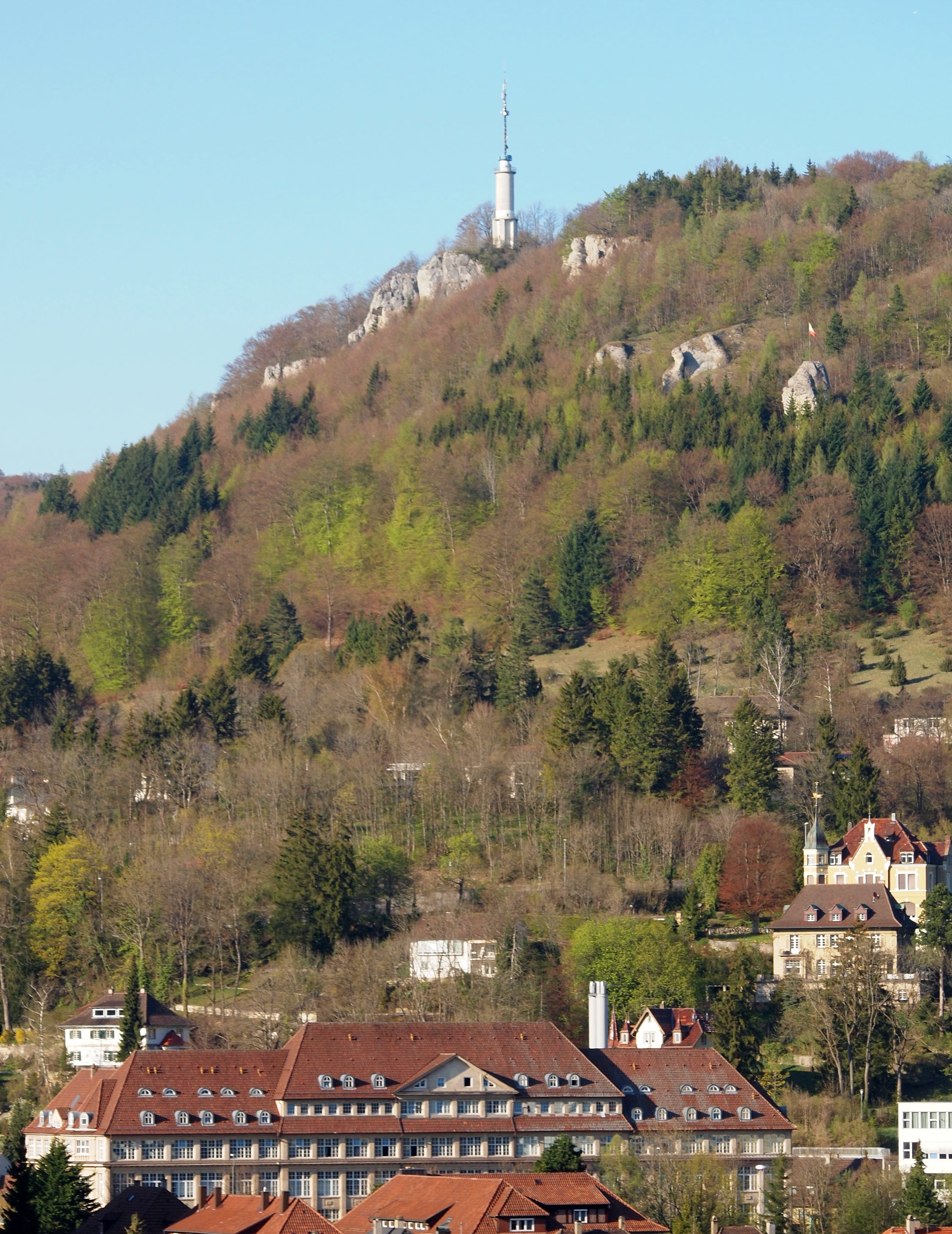
Castle rock and Haux factory

== Architecture ==
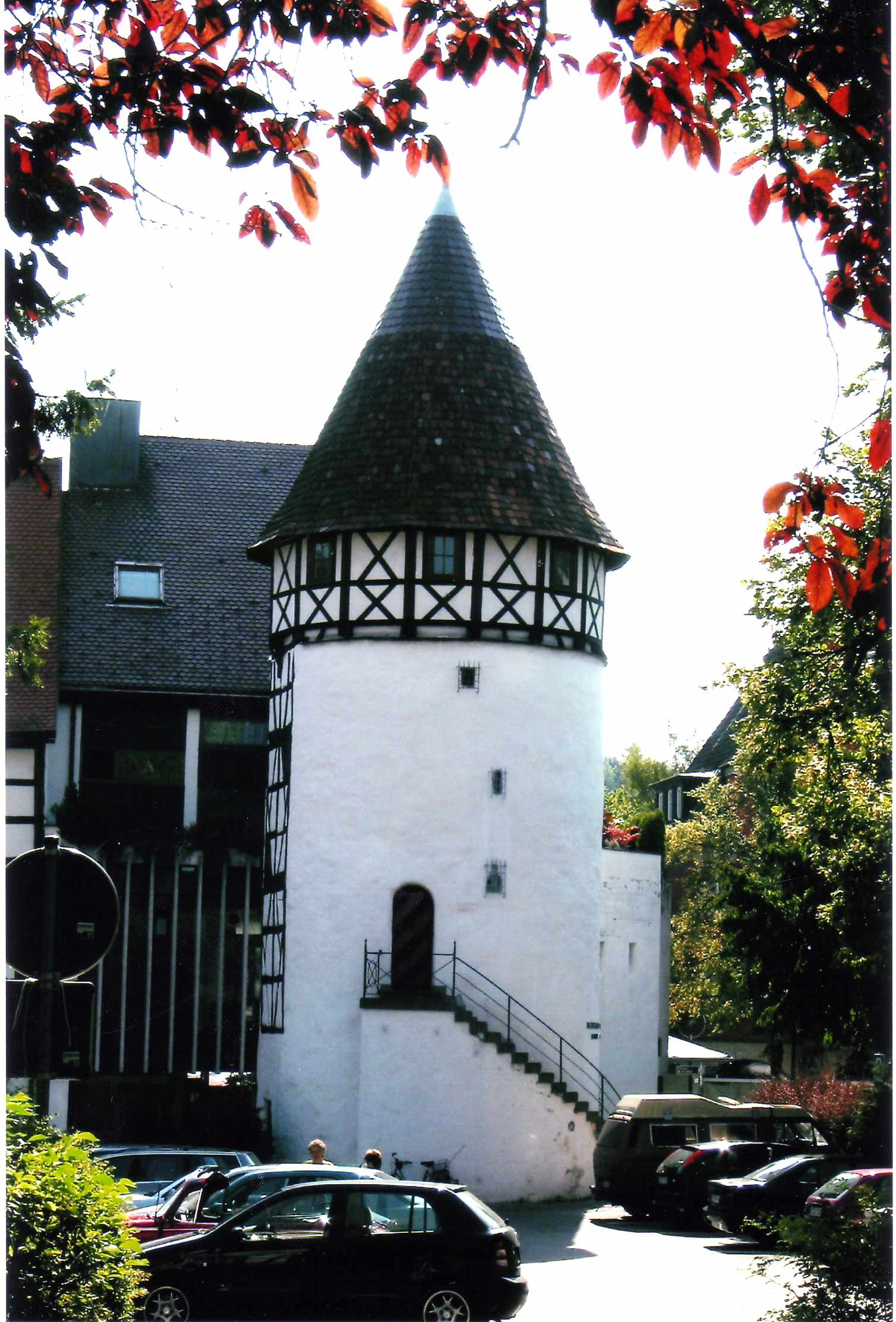
Citizens' tower, ~1500

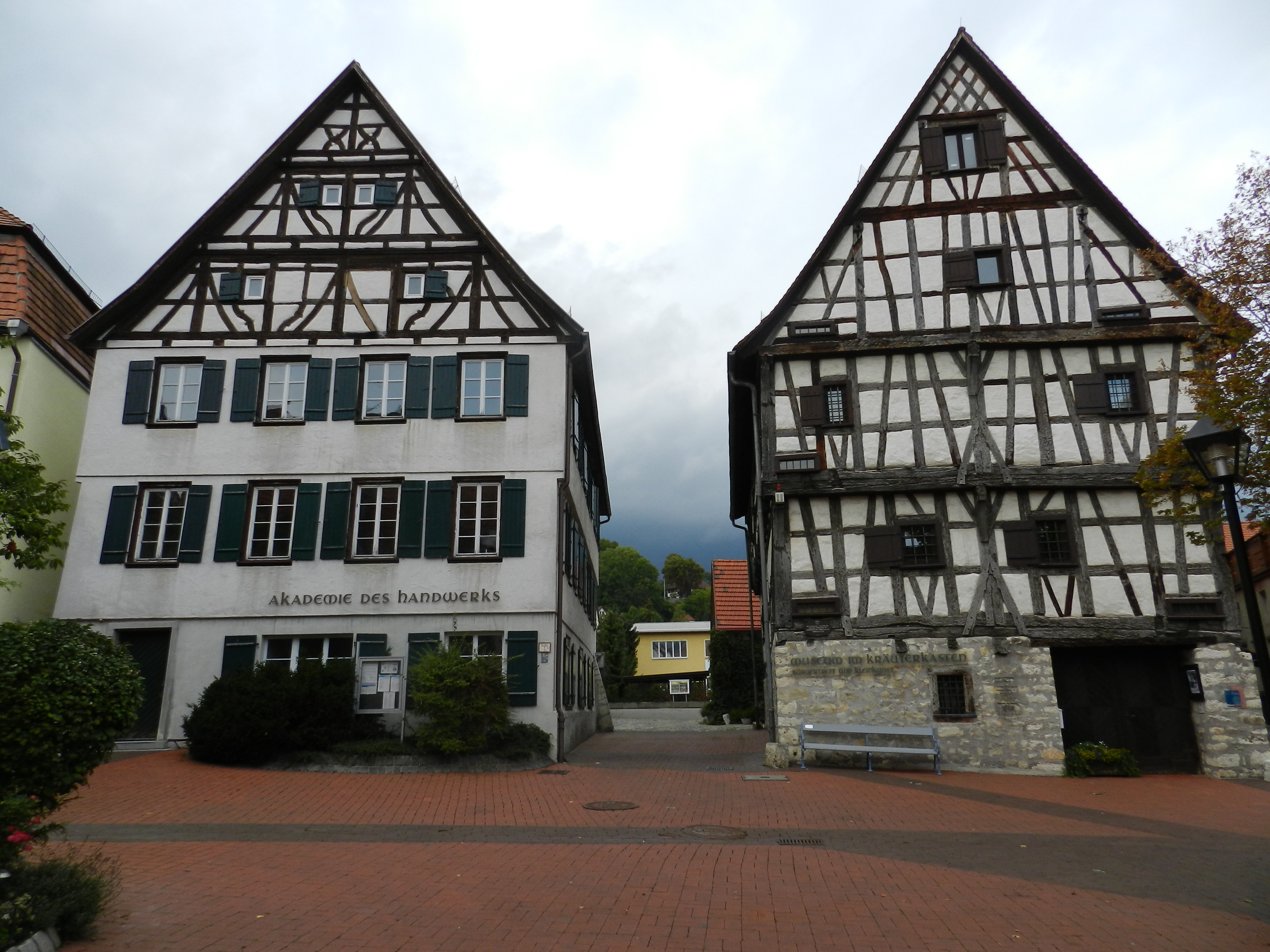
old warehouses

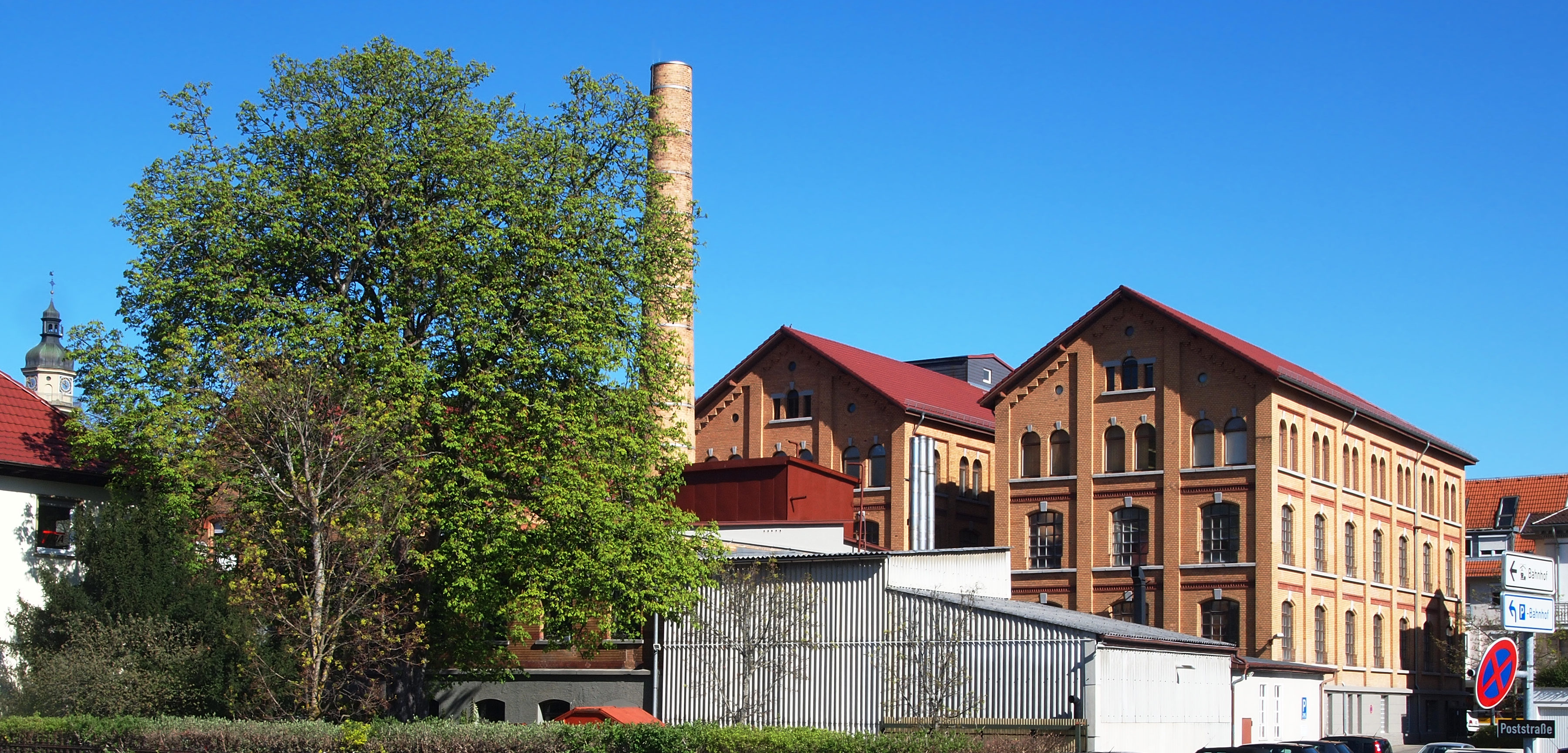
Former velvet factory

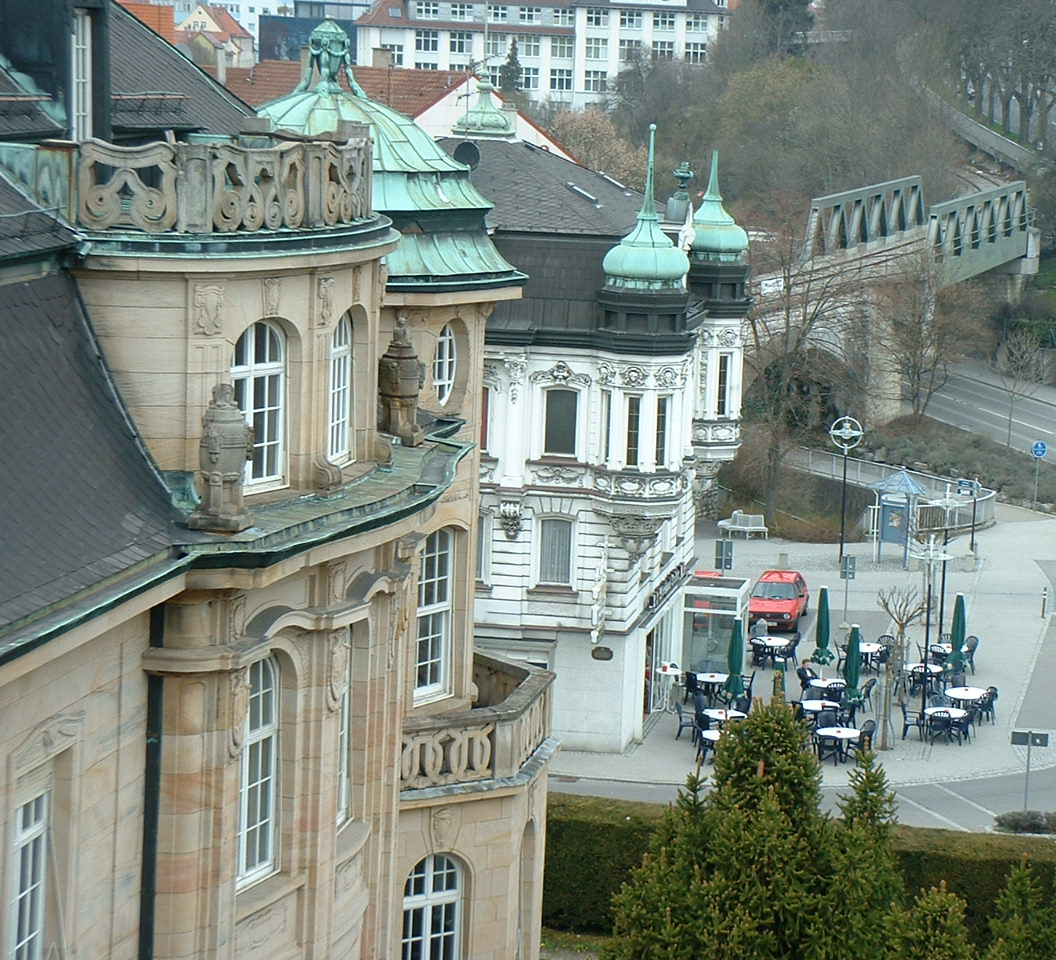
Haux houses

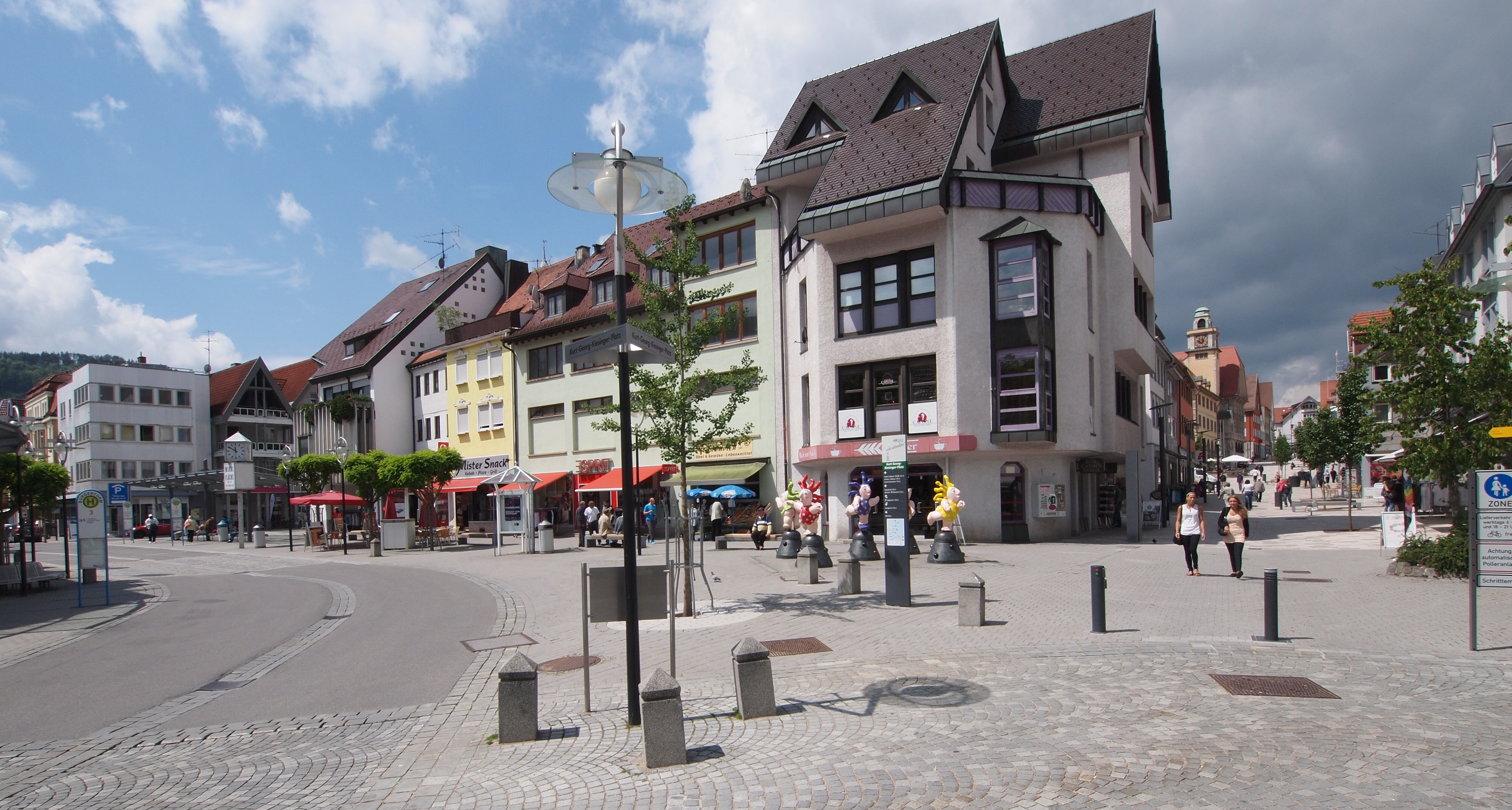
Central square: Schweinweiher, Kurt-Georg-Kiesinger-Platz, Marktstraße

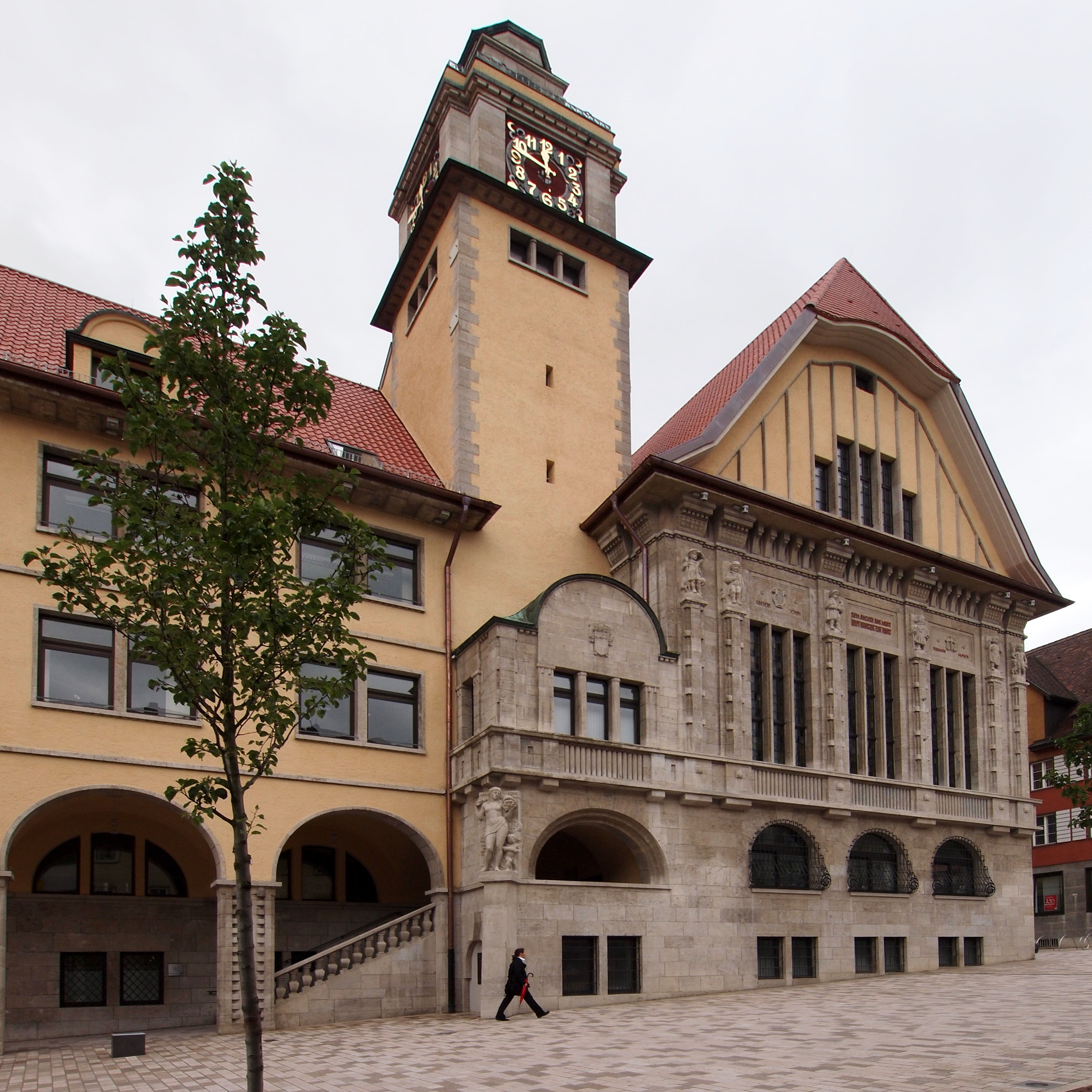
Art nouveau Town hall by Martin Elsaesser

=== Churches ===
- The main church of Ebingen is St.Martin's church. The choir is late gothic (1473), the tower from 1670. They are integrated in the art nouveau building from 1906.
- Next to the church is the former hermitage, inhabited from 1344 until 1608 by third order nuns.
- The smaller Kapellkirche was founded in 1382 „in honor of Our Lady and of the Holy Sepulchre in Jerusalem“. The existing building is from 1490, renewed in 1833.
- Since the reformation, Ebingen was Protestant. A new Catholic church was not built before 1892 for workers of the then growing industry. St. Joseph church needed to be enlarged in 1912.
- The evangelic Friedenskirche (peace church) was built in 1931 in New Objectivity style at the outskirt of the town. Urban development let it end up in a commercial area.
- After World War II, four modern churches were built, for both denominations in new residential areas in the west and east.
- The Taize Prayer is spoken in the Thomaskirche
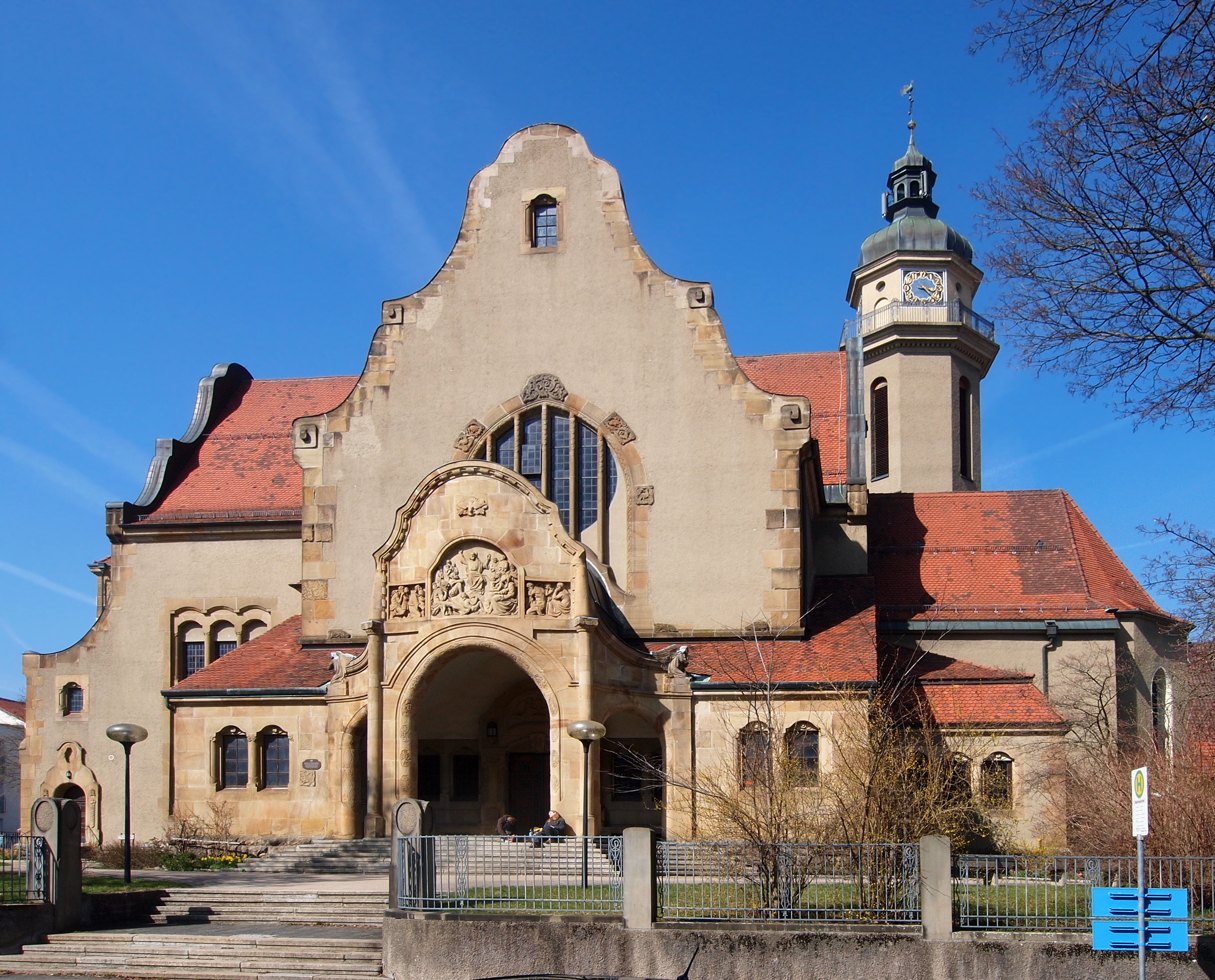
Martinskirche, main façade

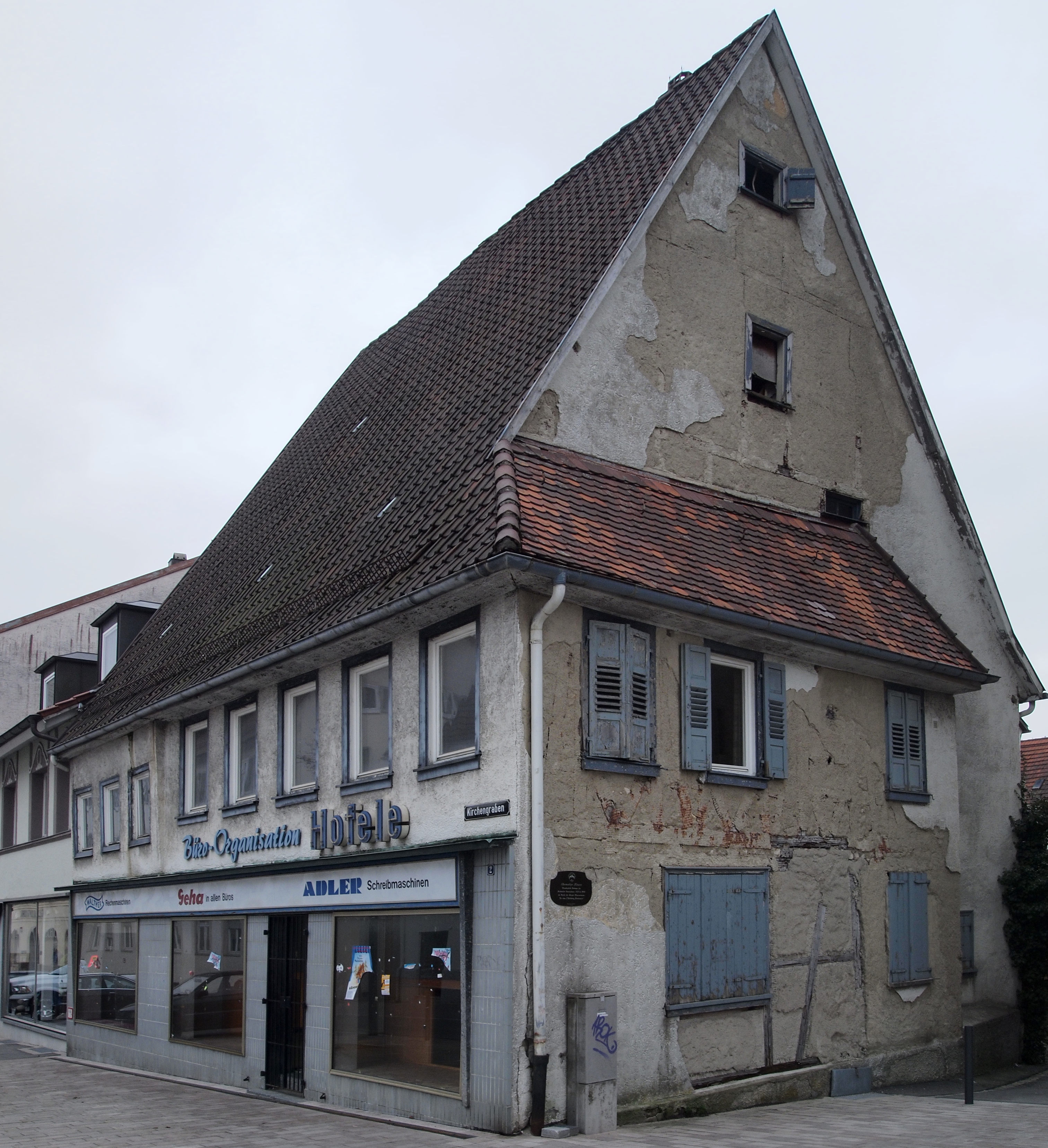
hermitage

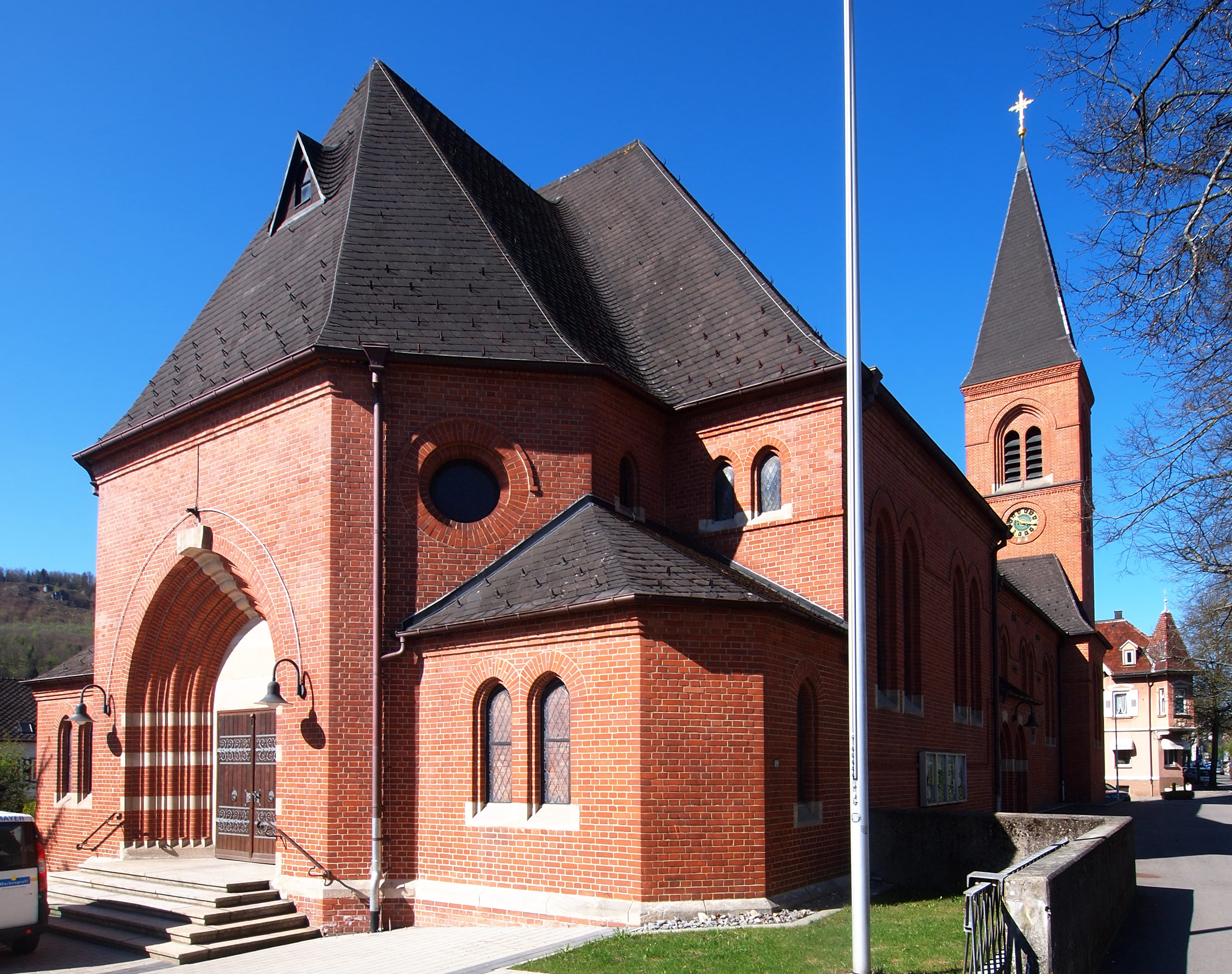
St. Joseph

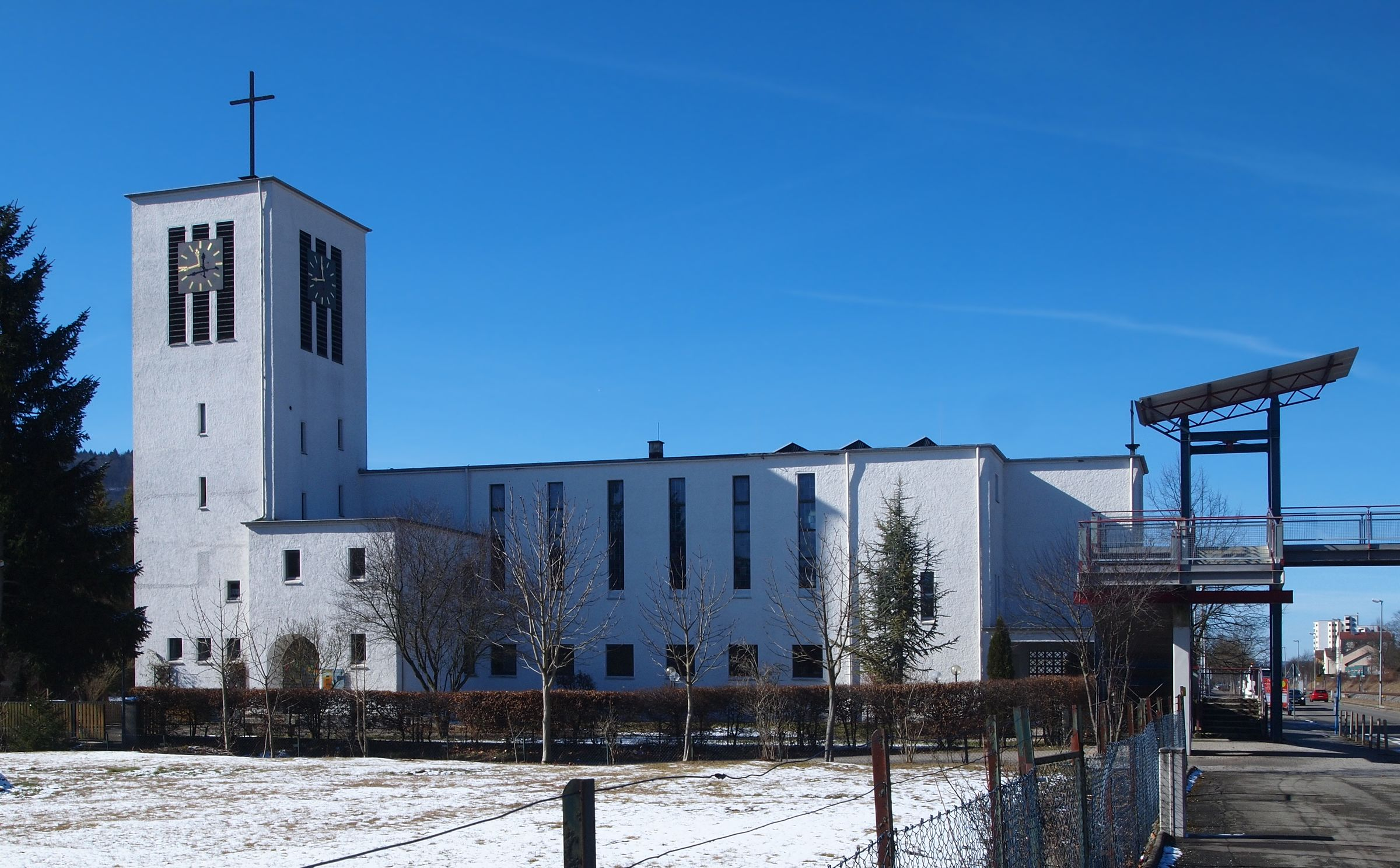
Friedenskirche

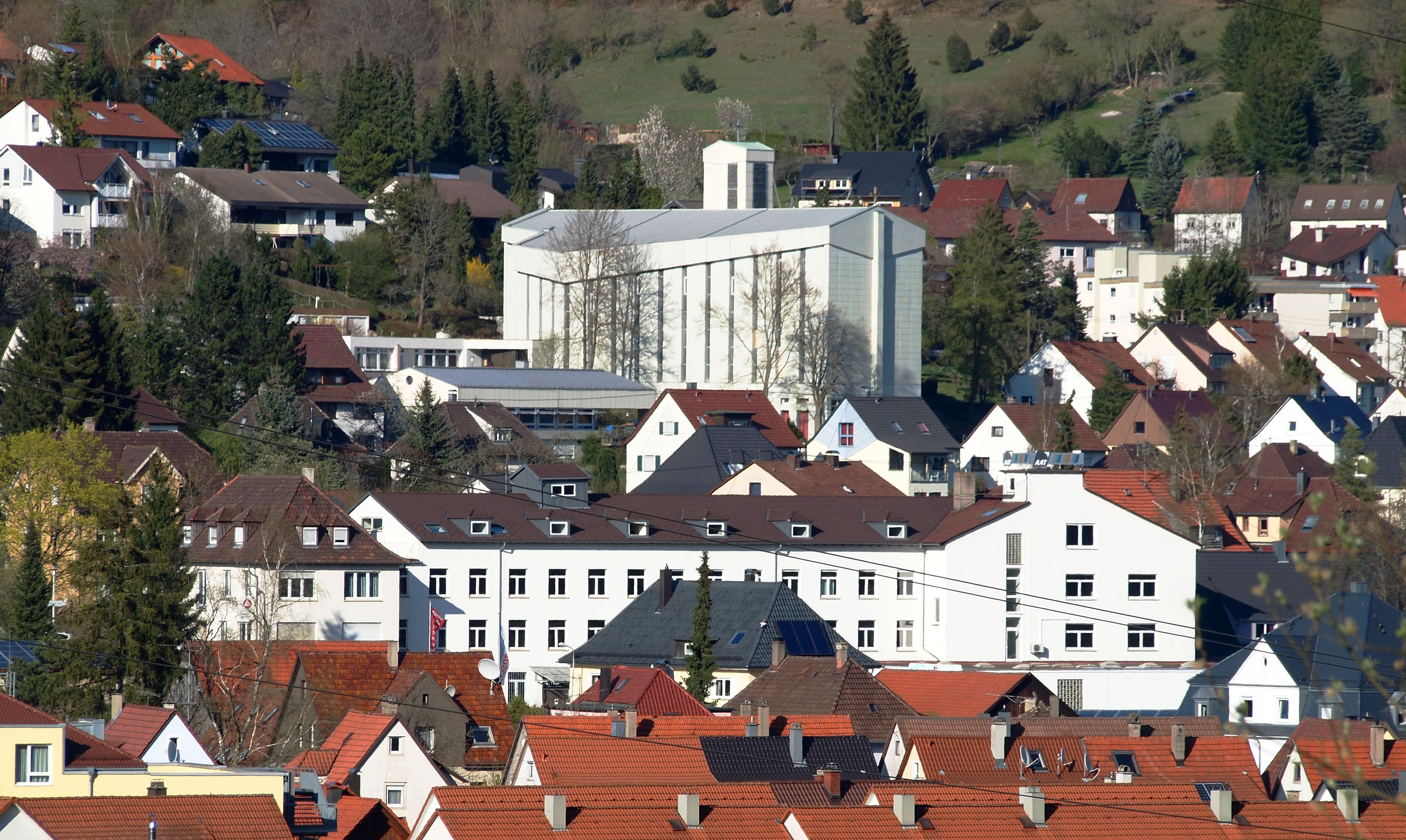
Heilig-Kreuz (holy cross)

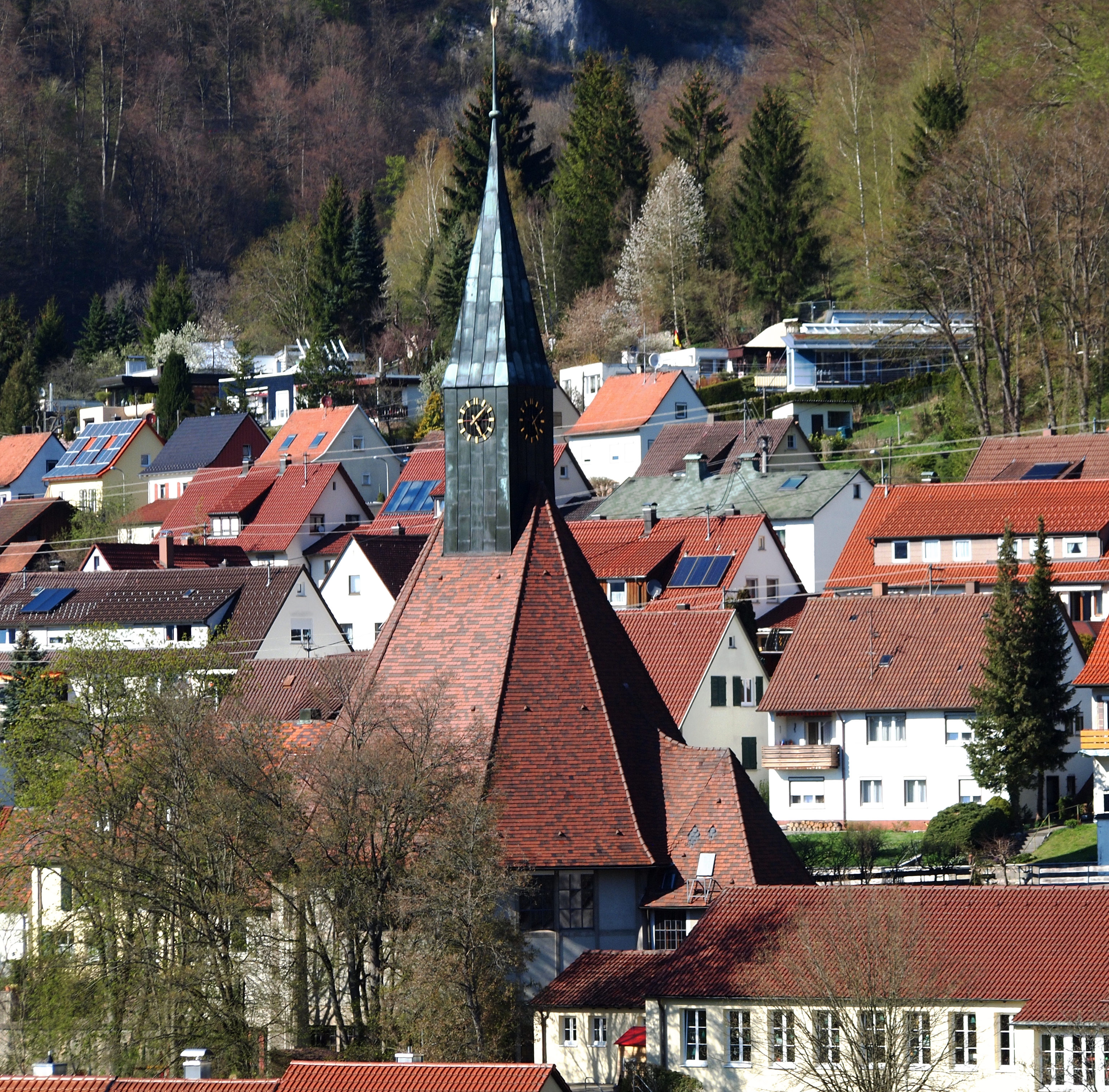
Thomas church

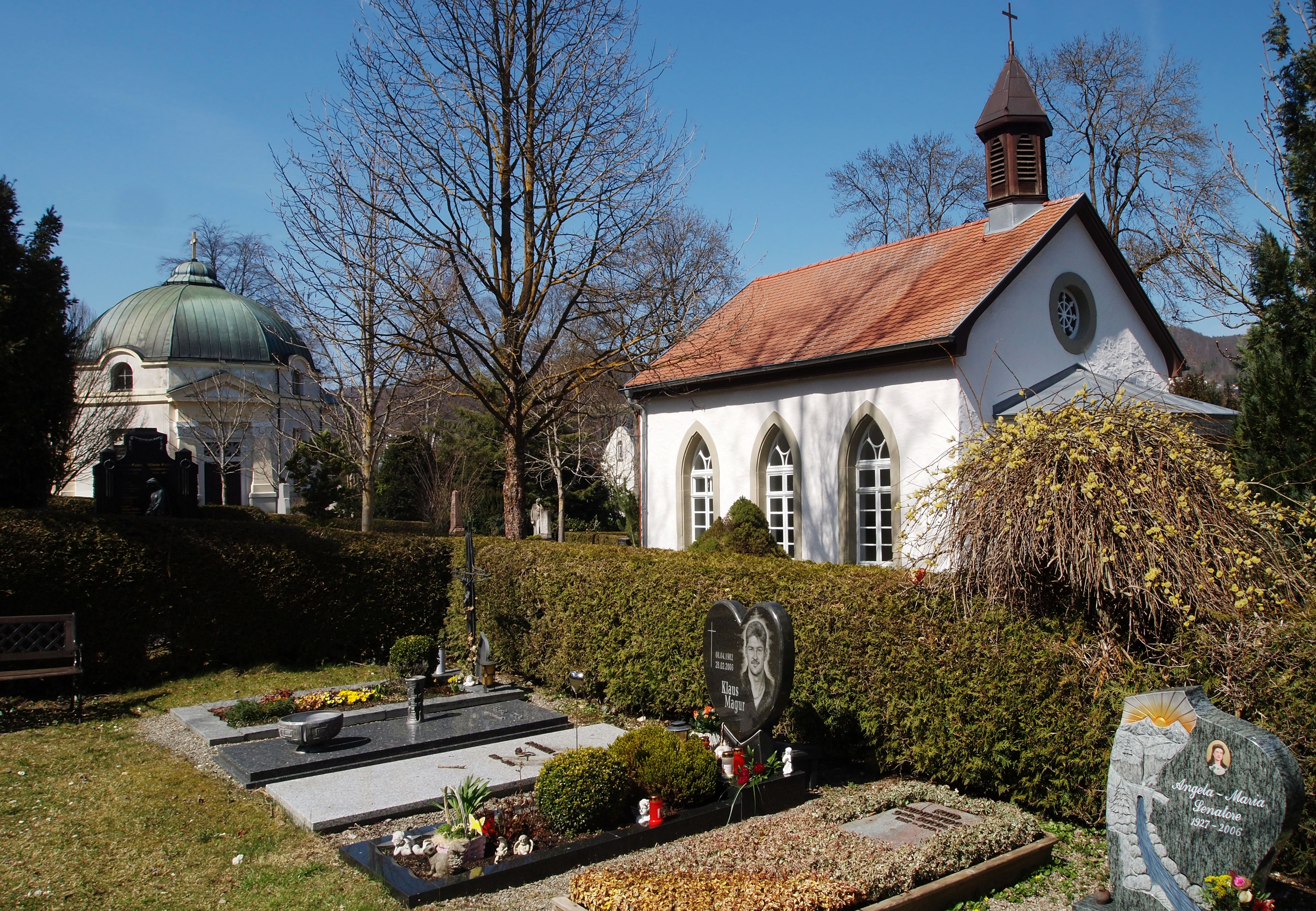
new and old cemetery chapel

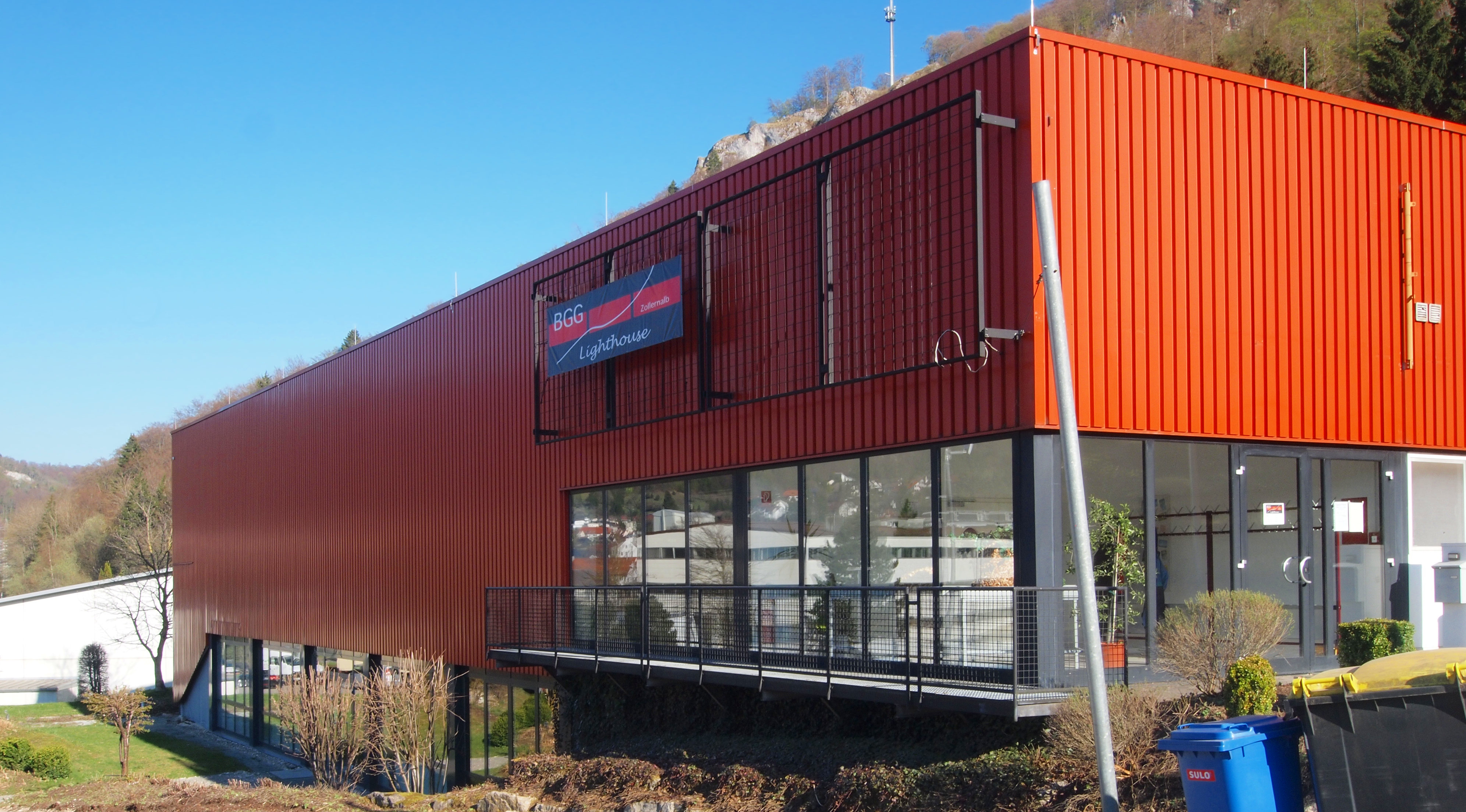
BGG Lighthouse (Pentecostal)

== Notable people ==
- Maximilian F. Bonzano (1821–1894), German-born American government official, politician, and physician
- Kurt Georg Kiesinger (1904–1988), German politician, former German chancellor
