= Meßstetten =

- Town
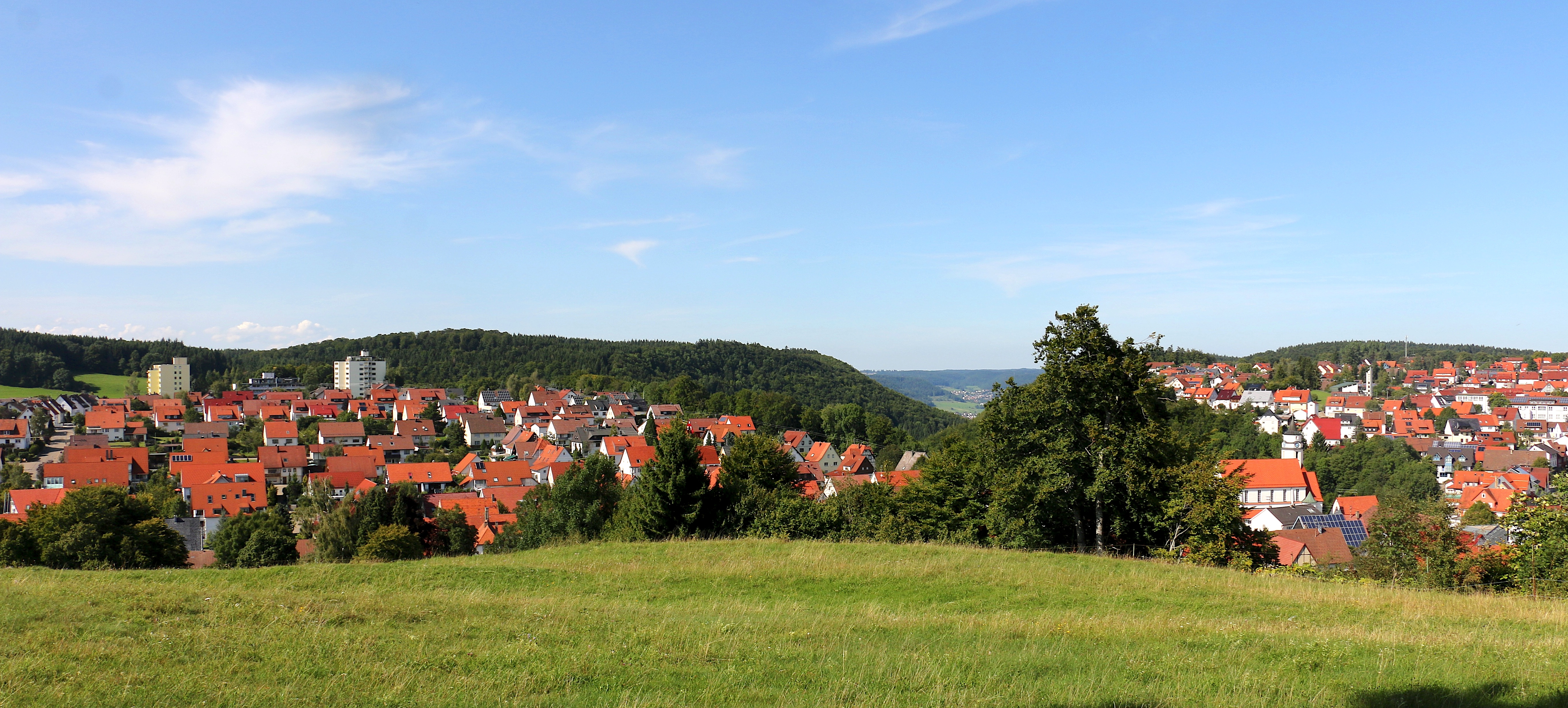
- View across Meßstetten

- Coat of arms

- Location of Meßstetten within Zollernalbkreis district
- Interactive map of Meßstetten
- Location within Germany Location within Baden-Württemberg
- Coordinates: 48°10′50″N 08°57′45″E
- Country: Germany
- State: Baden-Württemberg
- Admin. region: Tübingen
- District: Zollernalbkreis

Government
  - Mayor (2023–31): Frank Schroft (CDU)

Area
  - Total: 76.8 km^{2} (29.7 sq mi)
- Elevation: 907 m (2,976 ft)

Population (2025-12-31)
  - Total: 10,521
  - Density: 137/km^{2} (355/sq mi)
- Time zone: UTC+01:00 (CET)
  - Summer (DST): UTC+02:00 (CEST)
- Postal codes: 72465–72469
- Dialling codes: 07431, 07579, 07436
- Vehicle registration: BL, HCH
- Website: www.stadt-messstetten.de

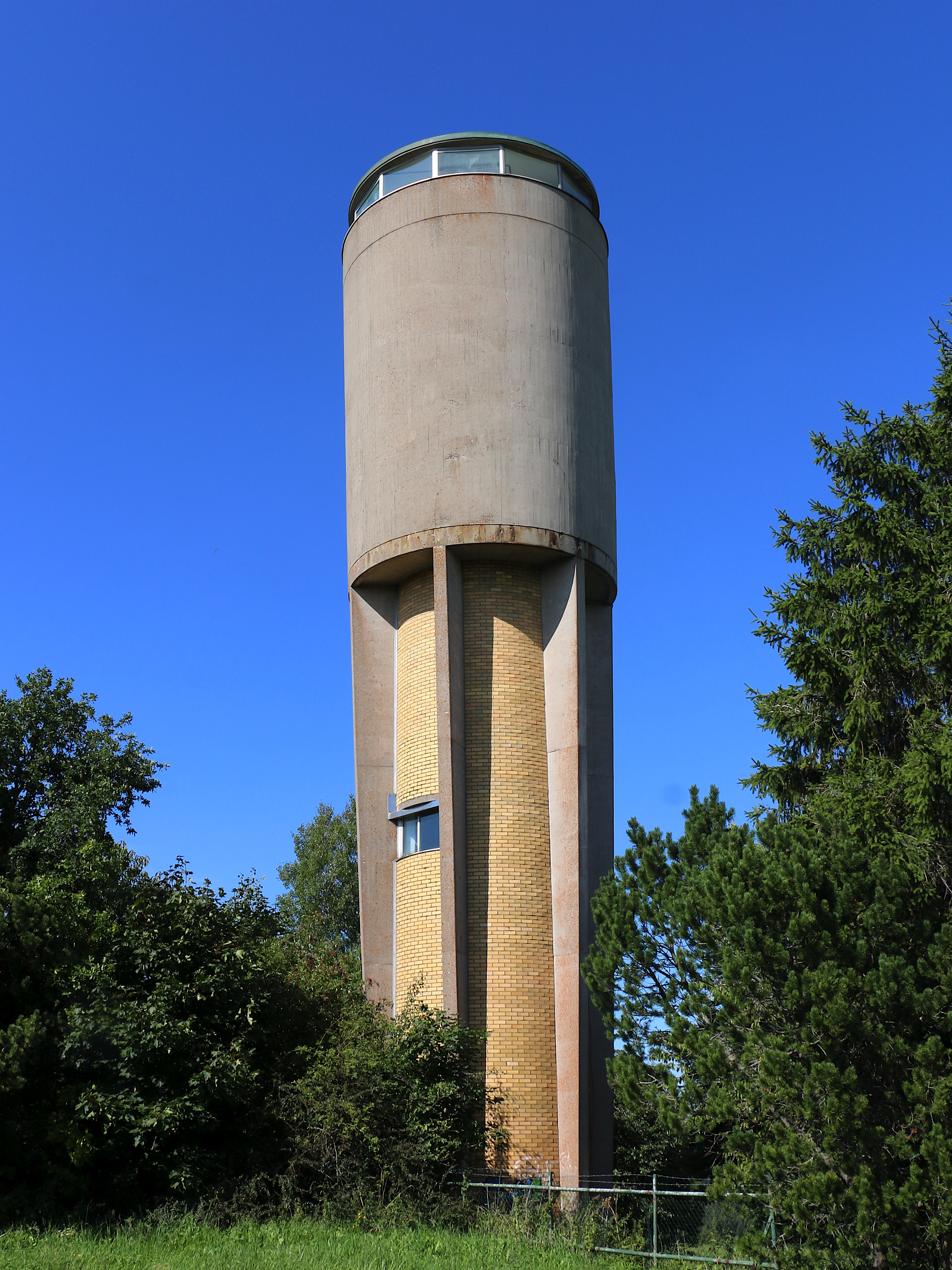
Water tower Rauer Bühl, a landmark of Meßstetten.

Meßstetten (German: [mɛsˈʃtɛtn]) is a town in the Zollernalbkreis district, in Baden-Württemberg, Germany, which is situated in the Swabian Jura, 24 km southeast of Balingen. At an altitude of 907 m (2,976 ft), Meßstetten is the highest city (of more than 10,000 inhabitants) in Germany. It is close to the Heuberg Training Area with the Lager Heuberg. Within the Heuberg Training Area there is the legendary Dreibannmarke, also called the "Bahn", a 17th-century border, which today marks the border between three different municipalities, formerly in the three states of Württemberg, Baden, and Hohenzollern. The meadow at the Dreibannmarke served as a stopping place for traveling merchants, wagons and craftsmen. With care it is possible to identify traces of the border. After the inauguration of the firing ranges, a meadow in Meßstetten was allocated as a camping site at the edge of the restricted area. Until 1835 merchandise was smuggled over the customs borders guarded by local hunters. Coffee smuggler Haux had was killed on 21 July 1831 in Pfaffental. Between 1934 and 1942, many men were sterilized because of "hereditary diseases". Under the program known as Aktion T4, the Nazis murdered mentally handicapped and mentally ill patients. These men and women were deported to the Grafeneck Killing Facility, where they were killed as "life unworthy of life". After the closure of Grafeneck in December 1940, a further deportation to the Hadamar Killing Facility occurred on 1941. After war a new city called Ostlandsiedlung was built.

== Economy and Infrastructure ==
The local economy mixes agriculture with services and small-scale industry. Most of the textiles industry (among them Göla, Sauter, branches and many Löhnnähereien) is gone today, Most of Meßstetten today has a residential character with many citizens working in the highly industrial areas near the railway of Albstadt or in Balingen. Only in Tieringen is an industrial area. A blacksmith developed to an industrial character, also a textile firm.

== Geography ==
=== Location ===
Meßstetten lies in the Swabian Jura on the Heuberg mountain at an elevation of 737 to 988 metres. Lying within the borough of Meßstetten, (917 m) Heinstetten is the highest village in the Swabian Alb. Measured by the elevation of the parish churches, the town is higher than Furtwangen im Schwarzwald, which claims to be the "highest town in Baden-Württemberg". Meßstetten is content with the statement, "one of the highest cities in the Federal Republic of Germany".

=== Administrative structure ===
The formerly independent municipalities of Hartheim, Heinstetten, Hossingen, Oberdigisheim, Tieringen and Unterdigisheim and Meßstetten itself were merged to form the municipal subdivisions of the town. The urban centre of Meßstetten and 19 other villages, hamlets, farms and (individual) houses are divided among the seven districts. The former military base of Bueloch for example has a primary school, gym, kindergarten and a church house, As such the former quartering patch, however, is not an official district, but only one of the city's 18 residential areas.

With the exception of the district of Meßstetten, all six other districts have the status of Ortschaften ("civil parishes") within the meaning of the Baden-Württemberg Gemeindeordnung each with their own local council (Ortschaftsrat) and council chair (Ortsvorsteher) as its chairman.

With the town borough there are several abandoned, now non-existent, villages. In the east of the district of Hossingen was the Riedhof, built around 1800 and demolished in 1918. In the district of Meßstetten there was a castle with a farmyard in the military training area on the Schlossberg. In the military training area there is an historical storage area for travelling traders, carters and craftsmen at the Dreibannmarke. With finesse it was possible to profit from the customs borders that existed until 1835. After the firing range was established, a meadow on the edge of the restricted area was allocated as a storage area until the Porajmos. The plot of land named in 1600 Freithof and the Kirchlesfels witness to an abandoned village, as does Immishofen, a farm in the Eichhalde, which presumably existed until the 15th century and is documented as a field name in 1496. In the Oberdigisheim district are the deserted villages of Ägelkofen and the hamlet of Geyerbad (Schwefelbad). Ägelkofen was named in 1253 and ceased to exist in the 14th century. North of Wolfenhof in the Unterdigisheim district, there was Beuren, mentioned in 1654 as Beyrental. Unterdigisheim is located southwest of Meßstetten and has about 650 inhabitants.

=== Protected areas ===
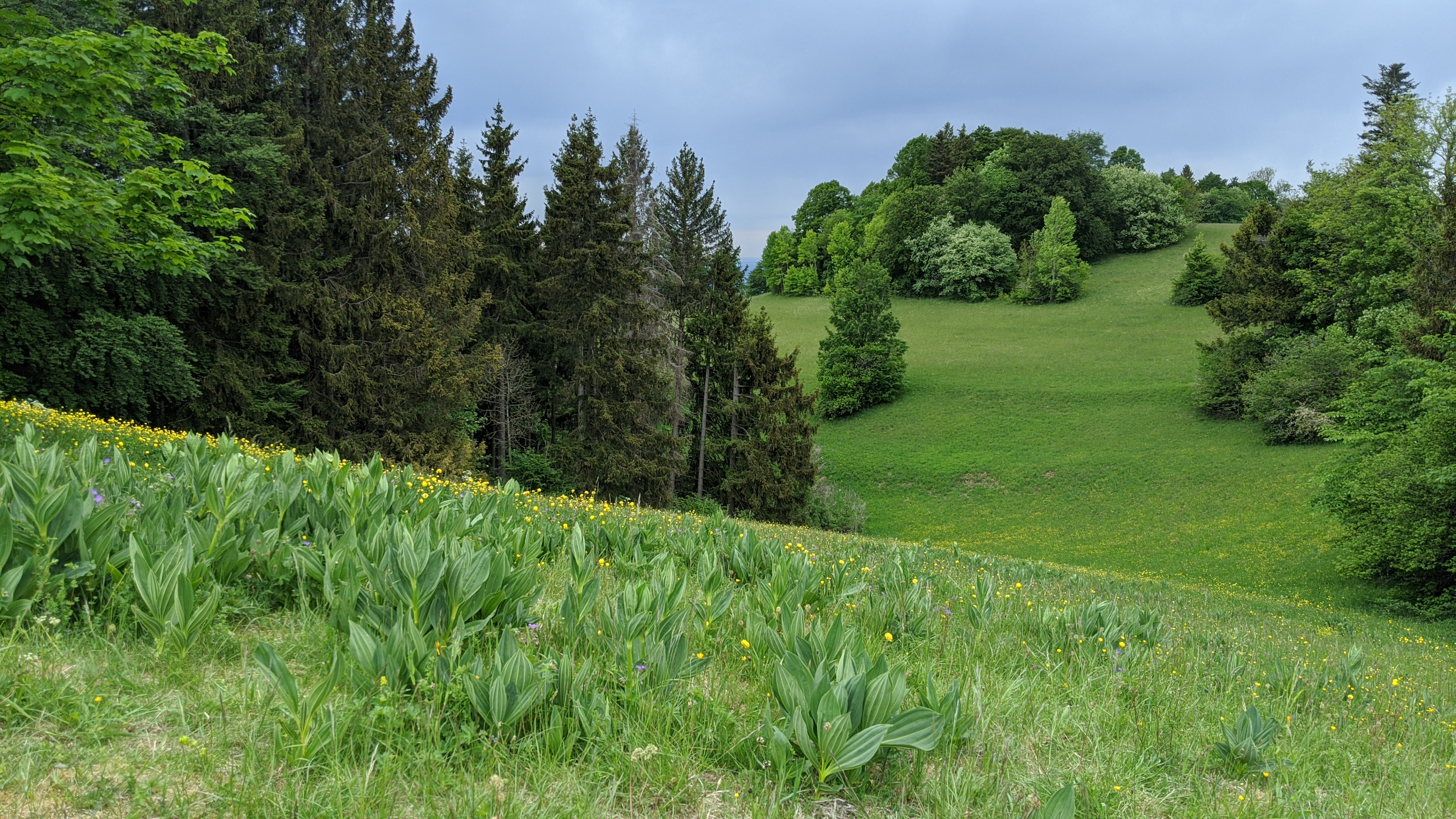
Hülenbuchwiesen nature reserve

There is a total of five nature reserves in the borough of Meßstetten. The nature reserve of Heimberg lies on a slope above Unterdigisheim, the Scheibhalden reserve is east of Oberdigisheim. In the far north of Tieringen lie the Hülenbuchwiesen and immediately adjacent to it the nature reserve of Untereck. The nature reserve of Stromelsberg-Hessenbühl is also in the Tieringen parish, but to the west. Almost the entire area of the borough is part of the protected landscape of the Großer Heuberg. Only the populated areas, nature reserves and the military training area are excluded from this.

Meßstetten shares two Special Areas of Conservation: the Eastern Großer Heuberg and Heuberg Military Training Area. The town also shares the bird reserve of the Southwestern Jura and Upper Danube Valley.

The entire borough minus the area of the military training area also belongs to the Upper Danube Nature Park.

== History ==
=== Prehistory ===
The area of today's Meßstetten was already settled in the Neolithic era. There are finds from the hohlen Fels ("hollow rock" in the Heuberg Training Area. The reason for this could be the very old trade route, the Bschorner Weg ("Bschorn Road"), which led from the Schmiecha valley via Meßstetten Castle into the Danube valley. The earliest of the established settlements was on the Lochen and dates from the 9th century BC, when Celts increasingly populated the Swabian Jura. Celtic burial mounds have been excavated on the terrain of Weichenwang, Wangen, Frankenreis and Hofen.

=== Ancient history ===
As a result of the Roman conquests in the south of today's Germany, which began in 15 BC, the Celts were subjugated by the Romans. Several finds are documented from this period, including the Celtic Gräbelesberg Castle and road structures. Meßstetten was part of the Roman Empire in the hinterland of the Alb Limes protected by Lautlingen Castle. In the area of the town of Meßstetten, pastor Alfred Ludwig Oetinger (from 1856 to 1868 pastor in Meßstetten and Hossingen) initially had extensive excavations carried out on his own account and later on behalf of the State Collection of Patriotic Antiquities. The extensive finds of grave goods indicate an early settlement of the region by the Celts. According to this, there was a settlement of wooden houses that were terraced on the rocks. Such a settlement could have been near Schreifels. Also the Heuneburg and a source in Egesheim provide rich finds. A Hunnish metal mirror was made from an unusual metal alloy (59% copper, 40% tin, 1% lead). Corresponding workshops have been found on the Gräbelesberg and the Meßstetter Talbach in Lautlingen.

=== Middle Ages ===
Meßstetten was first mentioned in AD 854 in a deed of gift from a high Franconian nobleman named Adelhard. Meßstetten was a transit area and settlement area for Celts and Romans, until the Alamanni invaded the area after 260.

The suffix "-stetten" indicates an Alemannic settlement. The "stetten" places on the Heuberg - such as Meßstetten, Heinstetten, Stetten am kalten Markt and Frohnstetten - were probably founded from Ebingen as shepherds' settlements in the 4th century. In the centre of Meßstetten, local pastor Oetinger investigated three Alemanni cemeteries between 1864 and 1867.

In the early Middle Ages, Meßstetten belonged to the Scherragau, the name Scherra meaning rock. In the 12th century most of it was owned by the Counts of Hohenberg, who were also local lords of Meßstetten and some of today's districts. The gentlemen of Meßstetten were a noble Dienstmannen family and had their seat in a castle. There used to be several castles and tower houses in Meßstetten. Four larger castle sites are located on the historic Bschorner Weg into the Danube Valley in the restricted area: these are the castles of Meßstetten, Oberdigisheim, Tieringen and on the mountain path in the direction of Unterdigisheim, Hossingen.

The current district of Unterdigisheim was part of the Lordship of Werenwag, which also belonged to the County of Hohenberg.

Just like the lords of Hohenstetten (Heinstetten), the lords of Meßstetten emigrated to Ebingen in the 13th century to form a military upper class in the young town. Their coat of arms, a silver cup on a red background, is now the coat of arms of Meßstetten. It was adopyted in 1376 by the Ebingen Schultheiß John of Meßstetten.

From an ecclesiastical point of view, the Heuberg belonged to the St. Martin's parish in Ebingen and to the cemetery church in Nusplingen until Meßstetten received a church.

St. Lambert's Church was first mentioned in 1275. In 1360, the Tierbergs instituted a Jahrzeit in the church of St. Lambert at Meßstetten, in whose crypt a number of Tierbergs are buried.

In the 14th century, three more altars, each with a chaplain, were donated. The parish was also endowed with the patronage rights of Meßstetten and Frohnstetten and formed a small collegiate church with its four clergy in 1354. George of Werenwag ceded the tithe in Meßstetten to Beuron Abbey on 14 October 1477. In 1557, separate churches were built in the Nusplingen parish villages of Hartheim and Unterdigisheim.

Around 1300, Count Frederick of Zollern owned land and serfs in Meßstetten.

Count Henry of Hohenberg sold the village to Henry of Tierberg in 1347, who acquired Hossingen at the same time. Together with Tieringen, which he had also bought from Hohenberg in 1345, and his possession of other places he was able to form his own lordship in Meßstetten. In 1370, the Barony of Meßstetten was transferred to the Wildentierberger line.

=== Mining ===
In former times iron ore was mined on the Heuberg. Fidel Eppler was the name of the mine inspector. The buttress wood was bought in Truchtelfingen and used by Lautlingen miners at the Hörnle area. In Oberdigisheim Geppert in 1738 SHW-Ludwigsthal produced iron ore. From an old 3.5 km mine in an ooidal iron ore seam (Doggererzflöz) in Weilheim is wood in the Tuttlinger Fruchtkasten. Steel was produced in Tuttlingen by the Schwäbische Hüttenwerke in Ludwigstal, which produces now iron brakes. In Meßstetten-Michelfeld sand was found in an old arm of Danube. Christian Kiesinger (1876-1969) father of Kurt Georg Kiesinger had a factory. Ooidal iron ore (Bohnerz aus Eisenroggenstein) was found. After the Franco-Prussian War the mining was stopped. Jet work (to make black jewellery which was very fashionable), was called Beinschnitzen.

=== Smuggling until 1835 ===
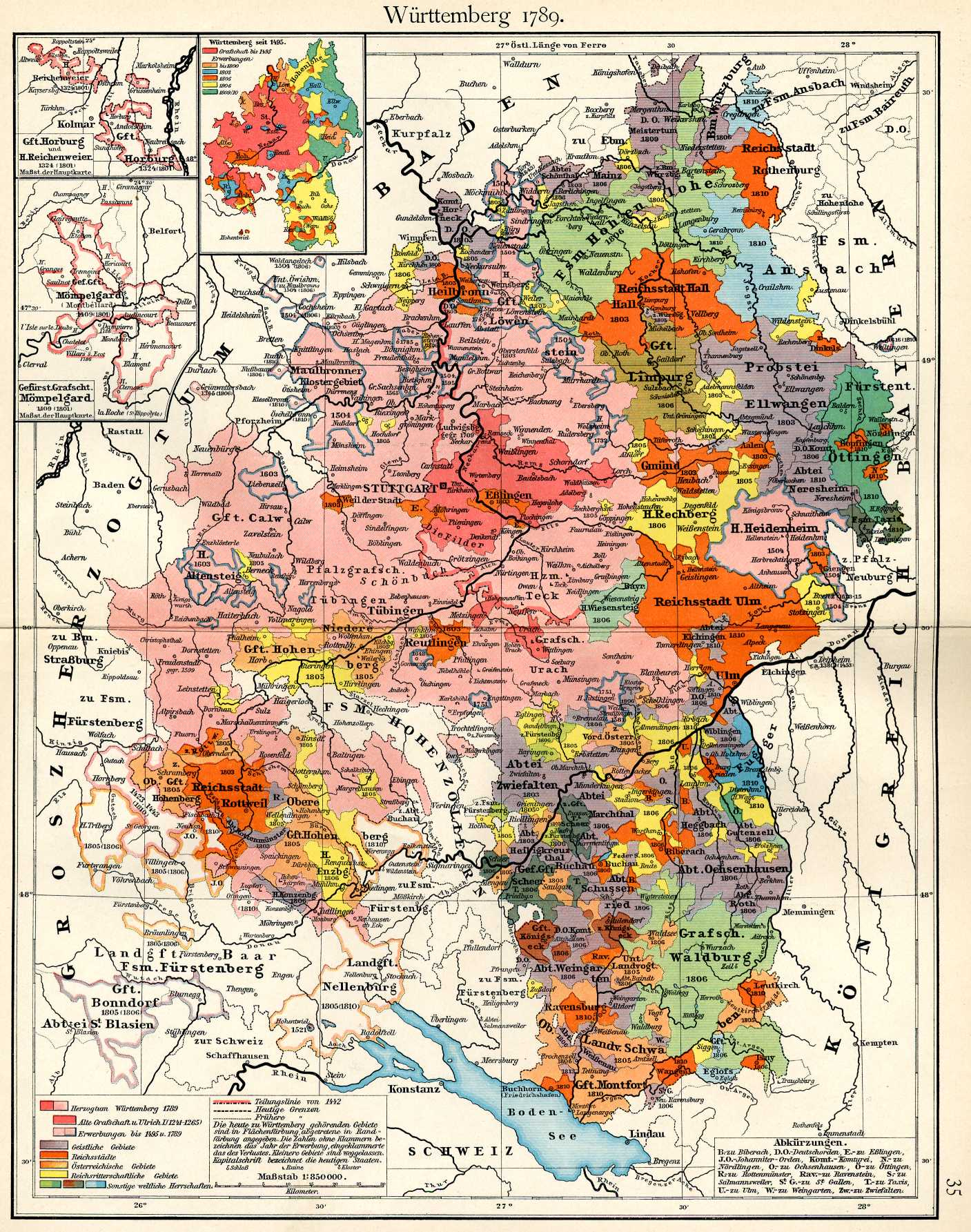
Württemberg and 15 Free Cities (in orange) and other territories during the mediatisations of 1803 and 1806.

Smuggling across the border (Württemberg, Baden, Province of Hohenzollern) in Meßstetten to, from Meßsteten- Heinstetten, Straßberg. 30,000 Bibles (Martin Luther) to Habsburg: Hans Ungnad von Weißenwolff, Freiherr von Sonneck, Hans III (1493–1564), famous Bible printer and smuggler in Bad Urach Smuggler, translator and Slovene refugee Protestant preacher Primož Trubar, who published the first books in Slovene and is regarded as the key consolidator of the Slovene identity, lived in Tübingen Derendingen. The smuggler was called Schwärzer in the local dialect due to the black camouflage color on his face.

=== Torfels ===
The Friederich List Straße is the way to Torfels(48.20063°N 8.9767°E) the Rock of Meßstetten. The Lautlinger Ortvorsteher : Meeting Point, a new conspiratorial group formed from castle Lautlingen, 20.Juli 1944

Erste Aufgabe ist die Wiederherstellung der vollkommenen Majestät des Rechts. Die Regierung selbst muss darauf bedacht sein, jede Willkür zu vermeiden, sie muss sich daher einer geordneten Kontrolle durch das Volk unterstellen“.„Die zerbrochene Freiheit des Geistes, des Gewissens, des Glaubens und der Meinung wird wiederhergestellt.

The statement of the new government, if the attempt to assassinate Adolf Hitler was successful known at the Torfels beforehand, bombing attack failed.

== Religion ==
The following religions are present in Meßstetten:

- Roman Catholic Church
- Evangelische Landeskirche in Württemberg in the former Württemberg
- Evangelische Landeskirche in Baden in the former Baden, parish in Stetten am kalten Markt
- Friedenskirche, United Methodist Church parish in Ebingen
- Versammlung of the Brüderbewegung, John Nelson Darby
- Gemeinschaftsstunde Süddeutsche Gemeinschaft, Liebenzell Mission, Evangelischer Gnadauer Gemeinschaftsverband
- Russian Orthodox Church guest service in Lamprechtskirche Evangelische Landeskirche in Württemberg

On 11 May 1525 the priest of (Meßstetten-Ober) Digisheim blessed the army in the German Peasants' War.

- Evangelisches Jugendwerk in Württemberg, Part of YMCA,local chairman in Hossingen and Meßstetten. Schutzkonzept
- Evangelisches Jugendwerk Überlingen-Stockach, in Hartheim ,Heinstetten Prävention
- Kath Jugenddekanat, Prävention
- Christian Endeavour, Schutzkonzept
- Kath Jugenddekanat Balingen

== Culture and sights ==
=== Food and drink ===
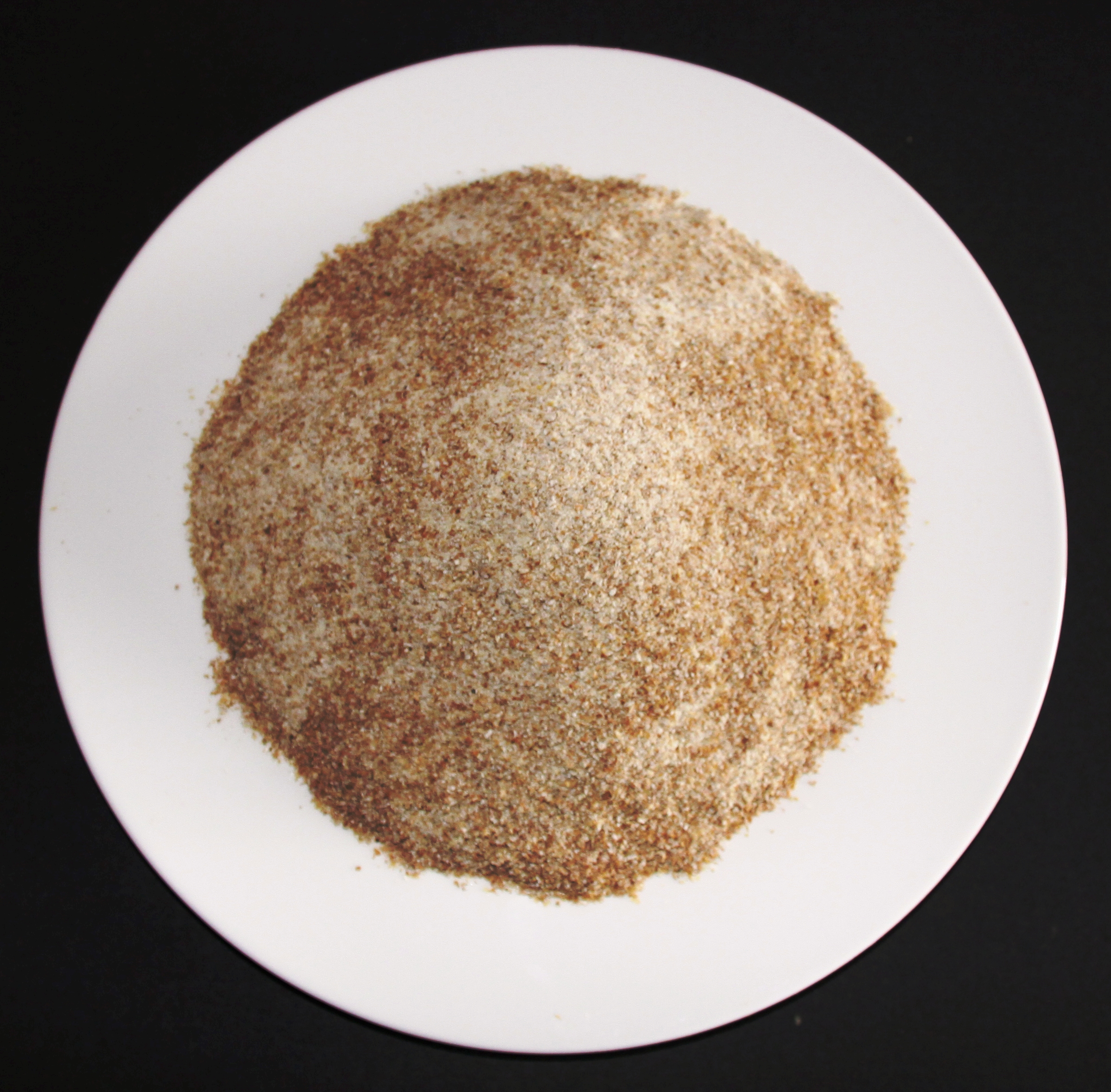
Musmehl, main ingredient of Brenntar

- Brenntar, was a Swabian staple foodstuff, of the old Meßstetten. It is made of a specially roasted flour called Musmehl. Roggensuppe (breakfast) is made of rye flour.
- Alb-Leisa, traditional lentil varieties of this region.
- Most traditional production of perry.
- Dubaknudeln, sweet bread.

=== Shrove Thursday ===
On this day the townhall is in the hands of the Fasnetsnarren. In Meßstetten the carnival play "Müllers Schuh im Mehlkasten" is historical. The Heuberg Training Area was criticized in the construction phase. "Funkenfeuer/Spark-Fire" is historical. In 2018 the ladies of the Royal Harem and Scheich Schrofti criticized the Police School in the construction phase. An old historical "freier Markt" is in the near Oberndorf am Neckar, also in Rottweil. During Fasnet the famous Fasnet-Küchle are made. Persons come with "Affagsichter" and "Schnitzbuckel" In 2017 was a big event in Hartheim. All roads were closed for over five hours. Sitting Bull (Mayor Frank Schroft) had big problems to put in the faucet to get the first beer In 2020 the assault gun fell out because of a barrel burst.

=== Sport ===
==== Mountains ====
The mountain range is protected as Upper Danube Nature Park, and is a popular tourist destination, especially for hiking, camping, mountaineering, horse back riding, mountain biking, skiing and snowboarding. The Schwäbischer Albverein and the Naturschutzbund Deutschland Alb Guides made many tours.

==== Hiking ====
The Schwäbische-Alb-Nordrand-Weg is a long distance way. The most famous is the Hossinger Leiter. It is an old way to the Tübingen–Sigmaringen railway from Hossingen and Oberdigisheim.

==== Fitness Course ====
On the Blumersberg Sport- und Freizeitgelände Blumersberg

==== Dirt Park ====
Only for bikes without engine drive mechanisms. Hill on the Blumersberg Sport- und Freizeitgelände Blumersberg no taxes.

==== Downhill ====
===== Tieringen-Balingen =====
legal trail, no taxes, for mountainbike from Meßstetten- Tieringen down the Albtrauf to Balingen-Weilstetten Lochenpass 4,7 km car road -bike trail shorten the hairpin bend down to 1,9 km by downhill single trail.

=== (Danube) tour guides ===
- Historic backdrop as an event location. Door to door saleswoman (Hausierin), Schwärzerin and Schlimmeres. Father: smuggling iron ore Tuttlingen (Eisenschmelze Ludwigstal).
- Hiking with the Ortsgruppe Hossingen of the Schwäbischer Albverein

Startingpoint: Sportheim Eichhalde, Schelmenwasenstraße 11, 72469 Meßstetten. Bibles of Martin Luther paid with cows way Bad Urach smuggler cave Meßstetten border to Crypto-Protestantism in Habsburg Empire Smuggler used caves in Meßstetten and Hossingen. Bibles of Martin Luther, coffee, corn and steel was smuggled. In 1831 the smuggler Haux was shot dead on the path. In the book Via Bologna a murder is on the secret path to the smuggler cave (48.188521°N 8.962843°E), today a hiking way.

=== Graves ===
- WW2 Graves

=== Heimatlied ===
Johannes Strölin wrote the traditional Hossingen song. Digital Drawing in the Hossingen Heimatmuseum. Melody: Wohl ist die Welt so groß und weit

Gruß an Hossingen

1.Oh Dörflein traut auf Bergeshöhen
du liegst mut Stolz im Sinn
Wo ich auch immer weilen mag
zu dir zieht es mich hin
Da wo die Jugendzeit entfloh
wie eine Frühlingsnacht
mit Wehmut denke ich zurück
an die vergangene Pracht

Refr. Oh Heimat mein dein Name klingt wie
heller Glockenschall in Berg und Tal
von Fels und Hang im sanftem Widerhall

2.Wenn ich vom Berg gezogen komm
dem stillen Dörflein zu
mein Herz schlägt schnell und voller Freud
mein liebes Hossingen du
Dem Hergott Dank für diesen Platz
auf den man dich gebaut
Im Blütenkleid erscheinst du
so schön wie eine Braut

3.Im Tal auf felsgem Grunde
das Lauterbächlein fließt
und auch an steiler Felsenwand
die Leiter mich begrüßt
Durch Felsenkluft und Buchenwald
zieh ich der Höhe zu
Das grüne Dach des Kirchenturms
schau ich in seliger Ruh

4.Und noch ein still verträumter Ort
soll nicht vergessen sein
Dort stand in längst vergangener Zeit
ein Ritterschloß so fein
Verfallen und vergessen ist
Das Schloß - die Herrn - die Macht
durch grüne Matten schlängelt sich
so schön der Burtelbach

5. Auch aus der Ferne grüß ich dich
du heißgeliebter Ort
im Herzen stets behalt ich dich
als einen goldenen Hort
wenn dann mein letztes Stündlein schlägt
will ich begraben sein
in Heimaterde bettet mich
zur ewigen Ruhe ein

Heimatlied actor: Harmonie Lautlingen: Wo auf des Tales schmalen Weg ein Wanderbursch am Bächlein geht 1998

=== Legends ===
==== Wangen ====
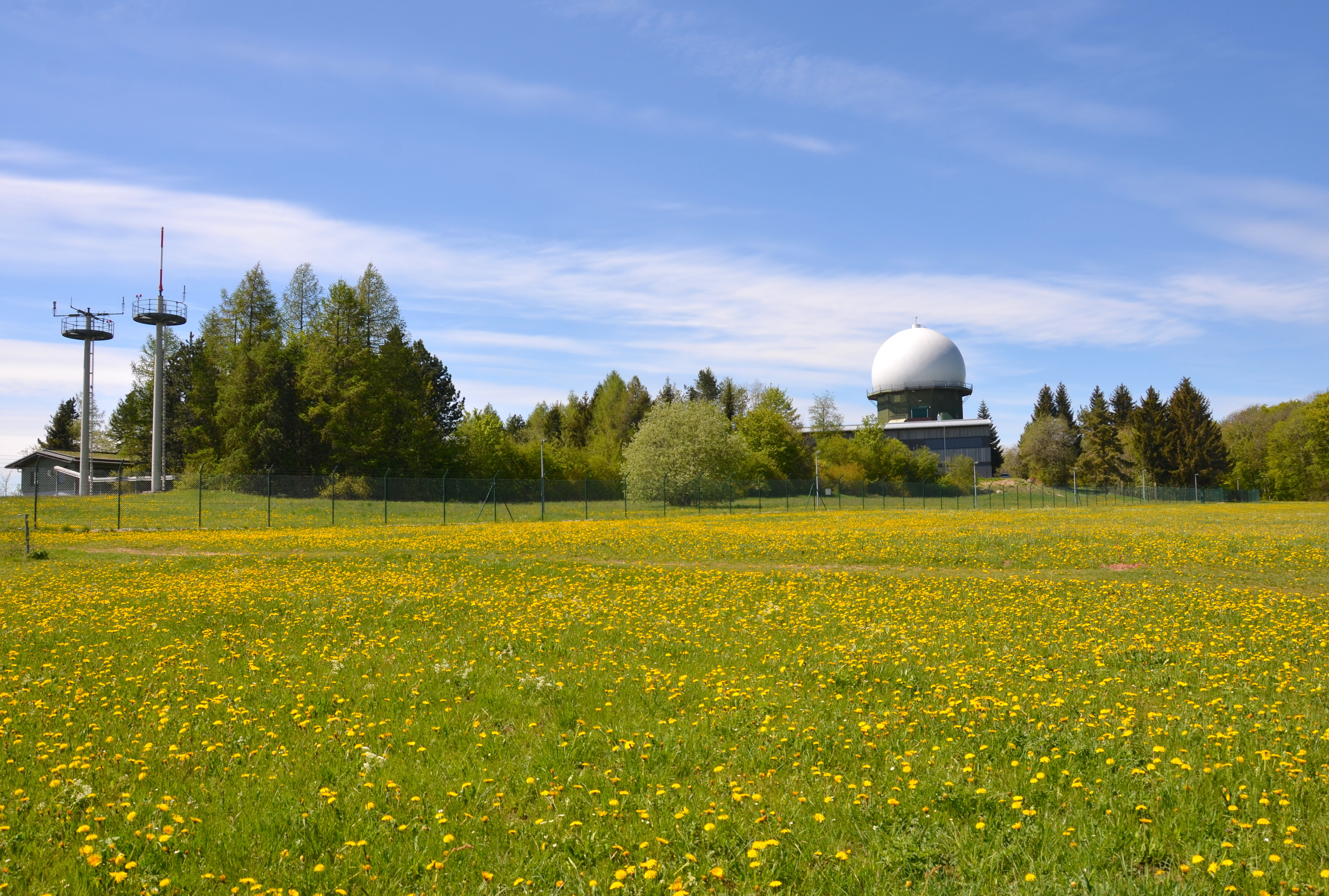
Radome on Weichenwang at Meßstetten

Places now lost are remembered in legend. A town called "Wangen" between Hossingen and Meßstetten has now disappeared. An as-yet undiscovered Celtic town of Pyrene was mentioned in ancient sources. The identification of Pyrene would bring special honor to researchers, since it is the oldest town in the Upper Danube region known from written sources. In 2010 more vague evidence occurs in old blood in the region of the Upper Danube: a virus of Crimean-Congo hemorrhagic fever, CCHF which mostly led to death in earlier times.

The locality "Neu-Wangenhausen" (Nüwenghausen), mentioned in a document from 1477, could be no other place in the district.

The microtoponyms (flurnamen) of the mountaintop "Weng" in the Heuberg Training Area and "Wangen" by the radar installation Weichenwang are in common use.

==== Antiquities ====
During the construction of a drainage ditch Alfred Ludwig Oetinger, pastor in Meßstetten und Hossingen from 1856 to 1868, discovered a bronze cauldron and potsherds near the Weichenwang. To the great derision of the workmen he secured the finds and forwarded them for scientific evaluation. Around 1850 the area was a frequent target of grave robbers.

The pastor then carried out systematic excavations, first on his own, and later on behalf of the "Staatssammlung vaterländischer Alterthümer" (State Collection of Patriotic Antiquities). The investigators documented unique finds of Celtic wagon burials with preserved wooden pieces and jeweled harness fittings. In 1869 it was impossible to exactly date the finds. Without evidence a very extensive, but short-lived, settlement was postulated at the time of the burials.

==== Hemmadhäddler ====
An old story talks about the Hemmadhäddlers, which are said to appear at certain times. A bold teamster from Tieringen was driving an empty wagon over the Weichenwang to Baienberg with a group of men from Hausen am Tann. At midnight he chanced to invoke the Hemmadhäddlers. All passengers survived the encounter with the apparitions, but they had to cut the traces of the skittish horses and abandon the wagon stuck in the deep loam.

==== Schimmelreiter's secret love-affair ====
Another old tale tells of a spectral rider on a white horse (Schimmelreiter), who secretly visited his lover on the Weichenwang. Many times in stormy autumn weather a Schimmelreiter is said to be seen riding toward the Weichenwang (Heiligenwang) from the old castle of Burtel near Hossingen, the remains of which are visible today. Regarding the couple, there was a recorded relationship between a knight and the daughter of the lord of the castle, whose homes are said to be the castles of Hossingen and Tierburg. In 1898, Emil Schweizer included a version of this story in his article on the Balingen Mountains (Balinger Bergen). More vague evidence occurs in an old document: the noble knight Kunz acquired a castle in Meßstetten on July 14, 1327, from the Lord of Bubenhofen. It may be that lord of Castle Hossingen in financial difficulties so that he had to pawn his fiefdom to the rich lord of Bubenhofen. Perhaps the Schimmelreitier was Kunz, from Neuentierberg Castle, and had he acquired for his beloved her father's castle in Hossingen. In the Herrschaft Werenwag(Unterdigisheim, Hartheim) old tale tells of a spectral rider on a withe horse. His name is Doctor Schroff.

==== Bells in Schwenningen ====
Another old tale tells the transport of the Bells from St Lamprecht to st Columban Church in Schwenningen Heubeg. The local teachers found long time no documents- the message of bells is incredible. The greeting to normal people was Grüß Gott-Hört ihr eure Glocke, to Meßstetten. In 2023 the University of Tübingen found Hans Stokar in Switzerland On 11 May 1525 the priest of (Meßstetten-Ober) Digisheim (since 31.10 1519 Johannes Rieß in Oberdigisheim) blessed the army in the German Peasants' War. Germanus Kopp was the name of the priest of St Lamprecht in the time of German Peasants' War. Roland Steidle, a hobby historian located a Tyrannenbrief of Kallenberg in Karlsruhe archive. People from Hatheim and Unterdigisheim prevent, investigate, prosecute and punish. The church bells was taken away.

== Nature ==
=== Fruit trees ===
To help people to help themselves Württemberg plant an alley of trees. (Dienstbarkeit on private ground). Hossingen Parkplatz Oberbuch (48.191868°N 8.942837°E) Meßstetten Unterdigisheim (48.171666°N 8.947783°E) Alte Landstraße Obedigisheim (48.170788°N 8.900050°E)

The tree farms of Wilhelm and the Brüdergemeinde delivered for free. Today in a collective purchase order typical of old apple varieties.Collection point:Naturschutzzentrum in Beuron. The famous old Engelsbirne is produced today in a tree surgery Karle in Dautmergen.

==== Butterflies ====
On 7 July 2017 permission was specially granted by the Regierungspräsidium Karlsruhe for everybody to catch butterflies in Hossingen Rastplatz Oberbuch. It was called Schmetterlingsnacht (Butterflynight). The idea was born at the Schwäbischer Albverein in Hossingen. The state action: Dr. Robert Trusch, Dipl.-Biol, zentrale Landesdatenbank Schmetterlinge, State Museum of Natural History Karlsruhe (SMNK), Entomologische Abteilung.

Herbert Fuchs (Naturschutzbüro Zollernalb) was the leader of the training course.

== Twin towns ==
- There are links with Savigné-sur-Lathan and Luynes, both in France.

== Notable people ==
The following list includes notable people who were born or have lived in Meßstetten.

- Batian Dreher (Dreer) (born in Heinstetten) poacher, kept prisoner in Bärenthal
- Simon Weinckler (born in Heinstetten) poacher, 1538 kept prisoner in Bärenthal
- Stefan Löffler (born in Meßstetten) killed the forest keeper
- Hans Löffler (born in Meßstetten) poacher
- Veltin Walz, forester
- Agnesa Decker (born in Meßstetten, died 1587) not guilty in fire as witch
- Louis Schroff (1781-1816) doctor in Werenwag, old tale tells of a spectral rider on a white horse (Schimmelreiter)
- Friedrich Maier (1875-1945) major, peace provider 1945, killed in action
- Christian Kiesinger (1876-1969) farmer, brick factory in Michelfeld, father of Kurt Georg Kiesinger
- Martin Stengel (1877-1945) Lammwirt peace provider 1945, killed in action.
- Oskar Riegraf (1911-unknown) Oberleutnant, tribunal Standgericht in townhall in Meßstetten 21 April 1945. Under wrong name in America.
- Walter Strich-Chapell (1877–1960), actor
- Elisabeth Walter (1897–1956), teacher in Heinstetten. On the Heuberg Training Area was a place for gypsies before the Porajmos. In a book from Elisabeth Walter is narrated the story of Schmiedledick by the gypsy.
- Wilhelm Strienz (1900–1987), singer
- Berthold Schenk Graf von Stauffenberg (1905–1944), member of the failed 20 July plot of 1944 to assassinate Adolf Hitler and remove the Nazi Party from power - hunter in the wood of Meßstetten
- Claus Schenk Graf von Stauffenberg (1907–1944), member of the failed 20 July plot of 1944 to assassinate Adolf Hitler and remove the Nazi Party from power. Often on the way from Bueloch to Torfels. Hunter in the wood of Meßstetten.
- Hans-Joachim Eckstein (born 1950), university teacher, vicar
- Thomas Bareiß (born 1975), member of the Bundestag
- Pascal Bodmer (born 1991), Olympic Games 2010

== Gallery ==
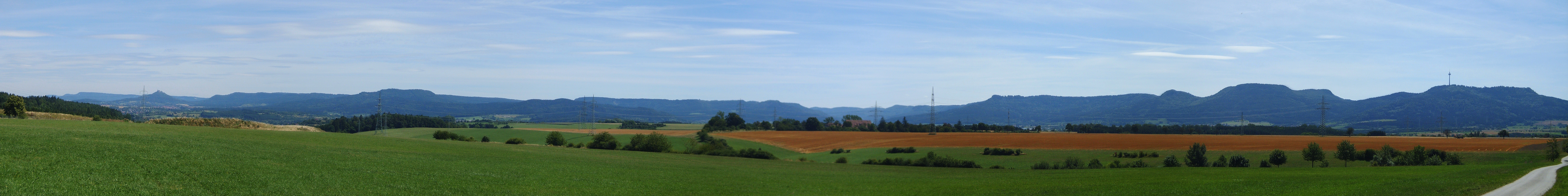
View of the Albtrauf. From left to right: Farrenberg, Hohenzollern Castle Meßstetten and Plettenberg.
