= Großer Heuberg =

Mountain range in Germany

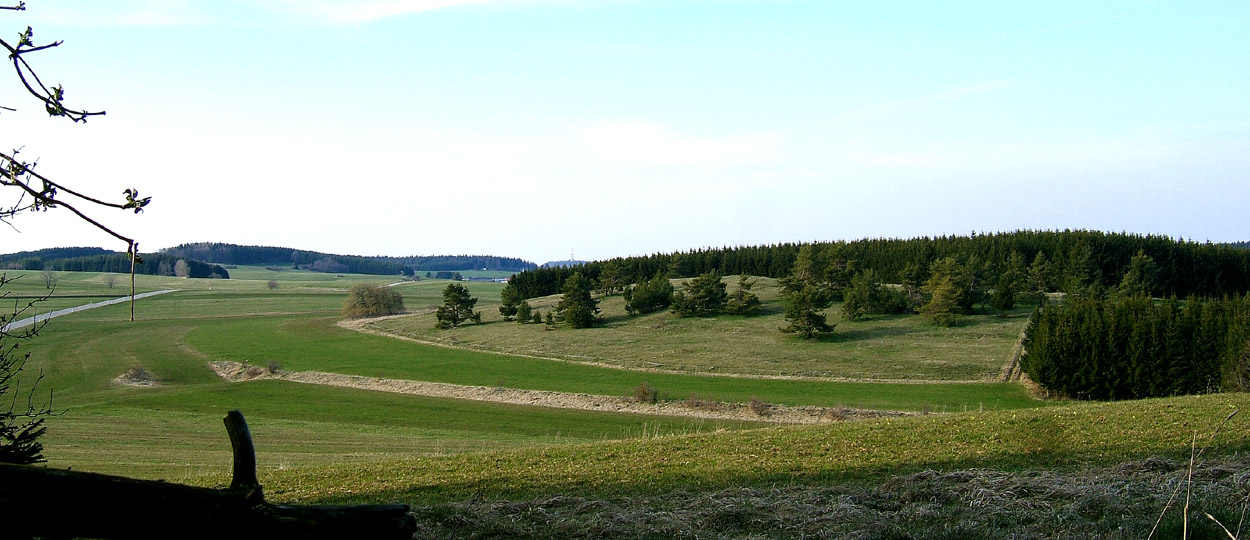
Upland plateau on the Great Heuberg

Großer Heuberg (Great Heuberg) or Grosser Heuberg, often simply called Heuberg (Swabian: Haiberg), is the name of a sparsely populated plateau in the southwestern Swabian Jura with mountains of about 1,000 metres above sea level or even higher. The word beginning Heu is German for hay, which was the major income source for the inhabitants in recent times and is until today formative for the landscape of the Heuberg. The word ending berg means mountain.

== Smuggling until 1835 ==
Smuggling across the border (Württemberg, Baden, Province of Hohenzollern) in Meßstetten. 30,000 Bibles (Martin Luther) to Habsburg: Hans Ungnad von Weißenwolff, Freiherr von Sonneck, Hans III (1493–1564), famous Bible printer and smuggler in Bad Urach Smuggler, translator and Slovene refugee Protestant preacher Primož Trubar, who published the first books in Slovene and is regarded as the key consolidator of the Slovene identity, lived in Tübingen Derendingen. The smuggler was called Schwärzer in the local dialect due to the black camouflage color on his face.

=== (Danube) tour guides ===
- Historic backdrop as an event location. Door to door saleswoman (Hausierin), Schwärzerin and Schlimmeres. Father: smuggling iron ore Tuttlingen (Eisenschmelze Ludwigstal).
- Hiking with the Ortsgruppe Hossingen of the Schwäbischer Albverein

Startingpoint: Sportheim Eichhalde, Schelmenwasenstraße 11, 72469 Meßstetten. Bibles of Martin Luther paid with cows way Bad Urach smuggler cave Meßstetten border to Crypto-Protestantism in Habsburg Empire Smuggler used caves in Meßstetten and Hossingen. Bibles of Martin Luther, coffee, corn and steel was smuggled. In 1831 the smuggler Haux was shot dead on the path. In the book Via Bologna a murder is on the secret path to the smuggler cave (48.188521°N 8.962843°E), today a hiking way.

== Rocket ==
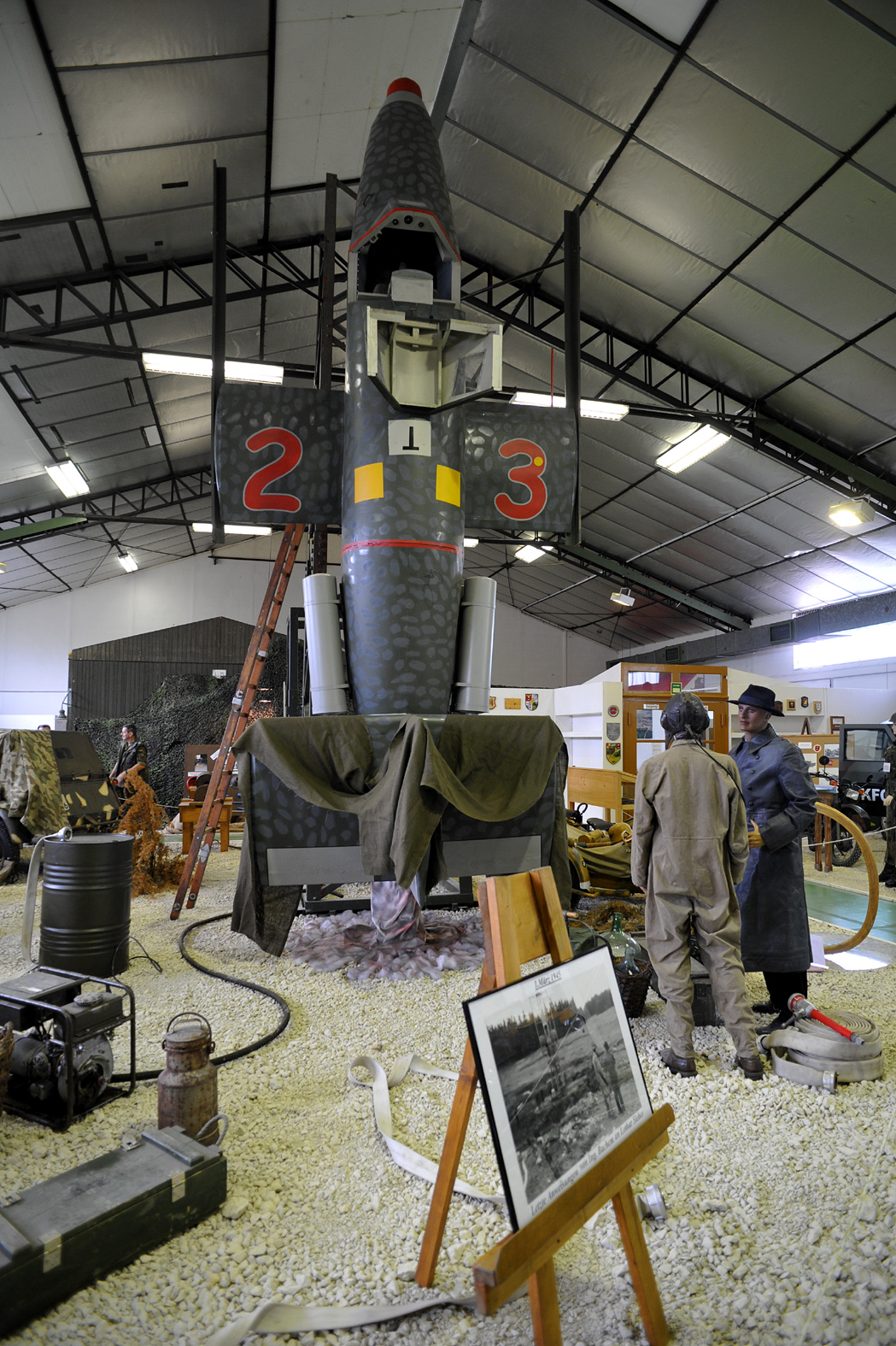
Trailing scene, Sieber discusses with Erich Bachem the final launch preparations, at the Militärgeschichtliche Sammlung Stetten am kalten Markt

in 1945 the rocket Bachem Ba 349 startet on the Heuberg Ochsenkopf in Straßberg-Kaiseringen. On March 1, 1945, Lothar Sieber died near Nusplingen. The first manned rocket flight in history. In 2010 Oliver Gortat and Philip Schneider made a documentary film about the Bachem Ba 349.

== Allenspach ==
The Überbündische Meeting (in short "ÜT") took place 1977 and 2017 in Allenspach near Böttingen courtyard of the evangelical church youth, Jungenschaft Horte. A total of 3.400 people took part in at least 45 different societies and institutions of scouts and youth movement.

== Climate ==
The climate of the Heuberg is harsh and cold; precipitation averages 1,000–1,100 millimetres (39–43 in) annually.

== Legends ==
=== Wangen ===
Places now lost are remembered in legend. A town called "Wangen" between Hossingen and Meßstetten has now disappeared. An as-yet undiscovered Celtic town of Pyrene was mentioned in ancient sources. The identification of Pyrene would bring special honor to researchers, since it is the oldest town in the Upper Danube region known from written sources. In 2010 more vague evidence occurs in old blood in the region of the Upper Danube: a virus of Crimean-Congo hemorrhagic fever, CCHF which mostly led to death in earlier times. The locality "Neu-Wangenhausen" (Nüwenghausen), mentioned in a document from 1477, could be no other place in the district.

The microtoponyms (flurnames) of the mountaintop "Weng" in the Heuberg Training Area and "Wangen" by the radar installation are in common use.

=== Antiquities ===
During the construction of a drainage ditch Alfred Ludwig Oetinger, pastor in Meßstetten und Hossingen from 1856 to 1868, discovered a bronze cauldron and potsherds near the Weichenwang. To the great derision of the workmen he secured the finds and forwarded them for scientific evaluation. Around 1850 the area was a frequent target of grave robbers.

The pastor then carried out systematic excavations, first on his own, and later on behalf of the "Staatssammlung vaterländischer Alterthümer" (State Collection of Patriotic Antiquities). The investigators documented unique finds of Celtic wagon burials with preserved wooden pieces and jeweled harness fittings. In 1869 it was impossible to exactly date the finds. Without evidence a very extensive, but short-lived, settlement was postulated at the time of the burials.

=== Hemmadhäddler ===
An old story talks about the Hemmadhäddlers, which are said to appear at certain times. A bold teamster from Tieringen was driving an empty wagon over the Weichenwang to Baienberg with a group of men from Hausen am Tann. At midnight he chanced to invoke the Hemmadhäddlers. All passengers survived the encounter with the apparitions, but they had to cut the traces of the skittish horses and abandon the wagon stuck in the deep loam.

=== Schimmelreiter's secret love-affair ===
Another old tale tells of a spectral rider on a white horse (Schimmelreiter), who secretly visited his lover on the Weichenwang. Many times in stormy autumn weather a Schimmelreiter is said to be seen riding toward the Weichenwang (Heiligenwang) from the old castle of Burtel near Hossingen, the remains of which are visible today. Regarding the couple, there was a recorded relationship between a knight and the daughter of the lord of the castle, whose homes are said to be the castles of Hossingen and Tierburg. In 1898, Emil Schweizer included a version of this story in his article on the Balingen Mountains (Balinger Bergen). More vague evidence occurs in an old document: the noble knight Kunz acquired a castle in Meßstetten on July 14, 1327, from the Lord of Bubenhofen. It may be that lord of Castle Hossingen in financial difficulties so that he had to pawn his fiefdom to the rich lord of Bubenhofen. Perhaps the Schimmelreitier was Kunz, from Neuentierberg Castle, and had he acquired for his beloved her father's castle in Hossingen.
