= Weichenwang =

Mountain in Baden-Württemberg, Germany

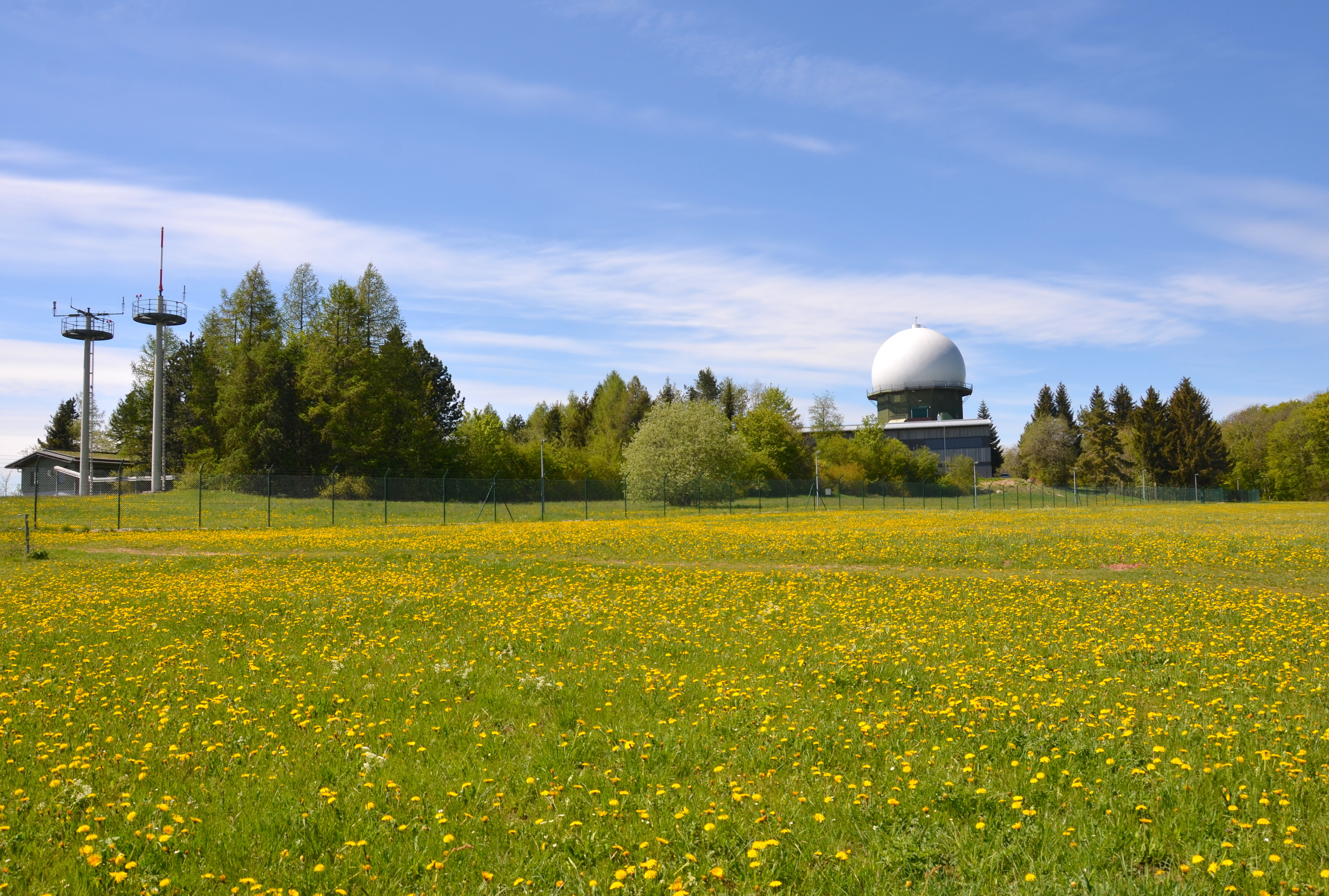
- Radome on Weichenwang

Highest point
- Elevation: 988.5 m (3,243 ft)
- Prominence: 116 m (381 ft)
- Parent peak: Schafberg (line parent)
- Isolation: 8.72 km (5.42 mi) to Schafberg Southern Summit
- Coordinates: 48°11′08″N 08°56′44″E

Geography
- Location within Germany
- Location: Zollernalbkreis, Baden-Württemberg, Germany

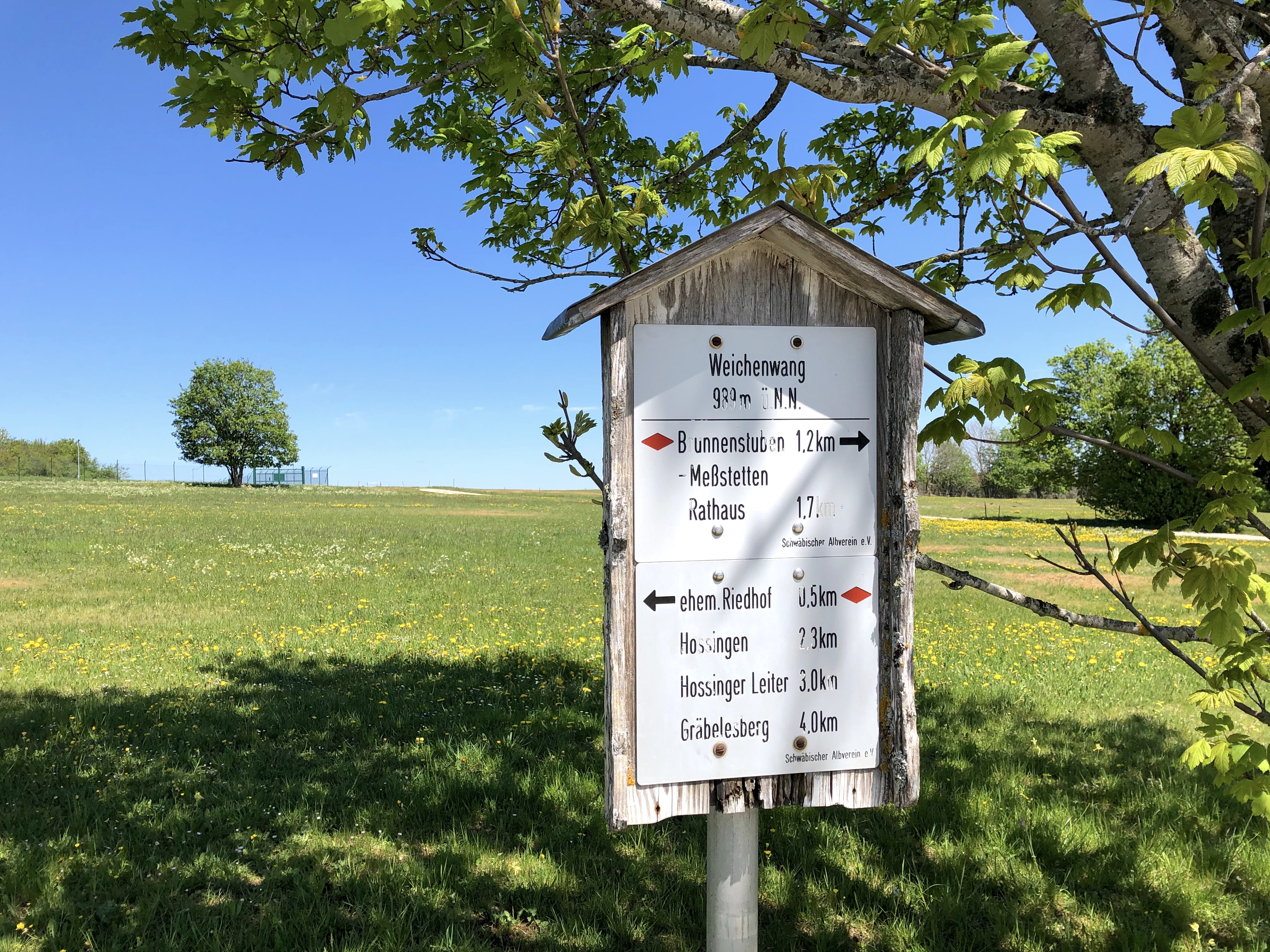
Information board of Weichenwang

Weichenwang is a 988.5 m-high (3,243 ft) mountain in the Swabian Jura in the town of Meßstetten, Zollernalbkreis in Baden-Württemberg, Germany. Since 1963 a radome of the Bundeswehr has been there, but its use as a military site is considerably older. Before the radome was built there had been a radio listening-post there.

== Legends ==
=== Wangen ===
Places now lost are remembered in legend. A town called "Wangen" between Hossingen and Meßstetten has now disappeared. An as-yet undiscovered Celtic town of Pyrene was mentioned in ancient sources. The identification of Pyrene would bring special honor to researchers, since it is the oldest town in the Upper Danube region known from written sources. In 2010 more vague evidence occurs in old blood in the region of the Upper Danube: a virus of Crimean-Congo hemorrhagic fever, CCHF which mostly led to death in earlier times. In Southern Germany Physalis food had been cultivated . The locality "Neu-Wangenhausen" (Nüwenghausen), mentioned in a document from 1477, could be no other place in the district.

The microtoponyms (flurnames) of the mountaintop "Weng" in the Heuberg Training Area and "Wangen" by the radar installation are in common use.

=== Antiquities ===
During the construction of a drainage ditch Alfred Ludwig Oetinger, pastor in Meßstetten und Hossingen from 1856 to 1868, discovered a bronze cauldron and potsherds near the Weichenwang. To the great derision of the workmen he secured the finds and forwarded them for scientific evaluation. Around 1850 the area was a frequent target of grave robbers.

The pastor then carried out systematic excavations, first on his own, and later on behalf of the "Staatssammlung vaterländischer Alterthümer" (State Collection of Patriotic Antiquities). The investigators documented unique finds of Celtic wagon burials with preserved wooden pieces and jeweled harness fittings. In 1869 it was impossible to exactly date the finds. Without evidence a very extensive, but short-lived, settlement was postulated at the time of the burials.

=== Hemmadhäddler ===
An old story talks about the Hemmadhäddlers, which are said to appear at certain times. A bold teamster from Tieringen was driving an empty wagon over the Weichenwang to Baienberg with a group of men from Hausen am Tann. At midnight he chanced to invoke the Hemmadhäddlers. All passengers survived the encounter with the apparitions, but they had to cut the traces of the skittish horses and abandon the wagon stuck in the deep loam.

=== Schimmelreiter's secret love-affair ===
Another old tale tells of a spectral rider on a white horse (Schimmelreiter), who secretly visited his lover on the Weichenwang. Many times in stormy autumn weather a Schimmelreiter is said to be seen riding toward the Weichenwang (Heiligenwang) from the old castle of Burtel near Hossingen, the remains of which are visible today. Regarding the couple, there was a recorded relationship between a knight and the daughter of the lord of the castle, whose homes are said to be the castles of Hossingen and Tierburg. In 1898, Emil Schweizer included a version of this story in his article on the Balingen Mountains (Balinger Bergen). More vague evidence occurs in an old document: the noble knight Kunz acquired a castle in Meßstetten on July 14, 1327, from the Lord of Bubenhofen. It may be that lord of Castle Hossingen in financial difficulties so that he had to pawn his fiefdom to the rich lord of Bubenhofen. Perhaps the Schimmelreitier was Kunz, from Neuentierberg Castle, and had he acquired for his beloved her father's castle in Hossingen.

=== Pyrene? ===
Pyrene (disambiguation) In the mid-5th century BC, the Greek historian Herodotus (Book 2.33) made a brief passing reference to a Celtic city called by the Greek "Pyrene": "For the Ister flows from the land of the Celts and the city of Pyrene through the very middle of Europe..." Since the Weichenwang area is roughly in the right location and was a small regional centre just before that time, it is possible, but is rather unlikely, that it is the settlement in the area referred that name.

== Web ==
- Sammlung Hieronymus Edelmann (1853–1921), Hyronimus Edelmann British Museum
- Morrissey Time 1:35
