= Heuberg Training Area =

Coordinates: 48.1681°N 9.0247°E

Arms of Heuberg Training Area

The Truppenübungsplatz Heuberg is a training ground of the German armed forces (Bundeswehr) in the districts of Sigmaringen and Zollernalbkreis, in the German state of Baden-Württemberg. Since the establishment of the Wilhelmine Empire it has always been a reflection of German history.

== Geography ==
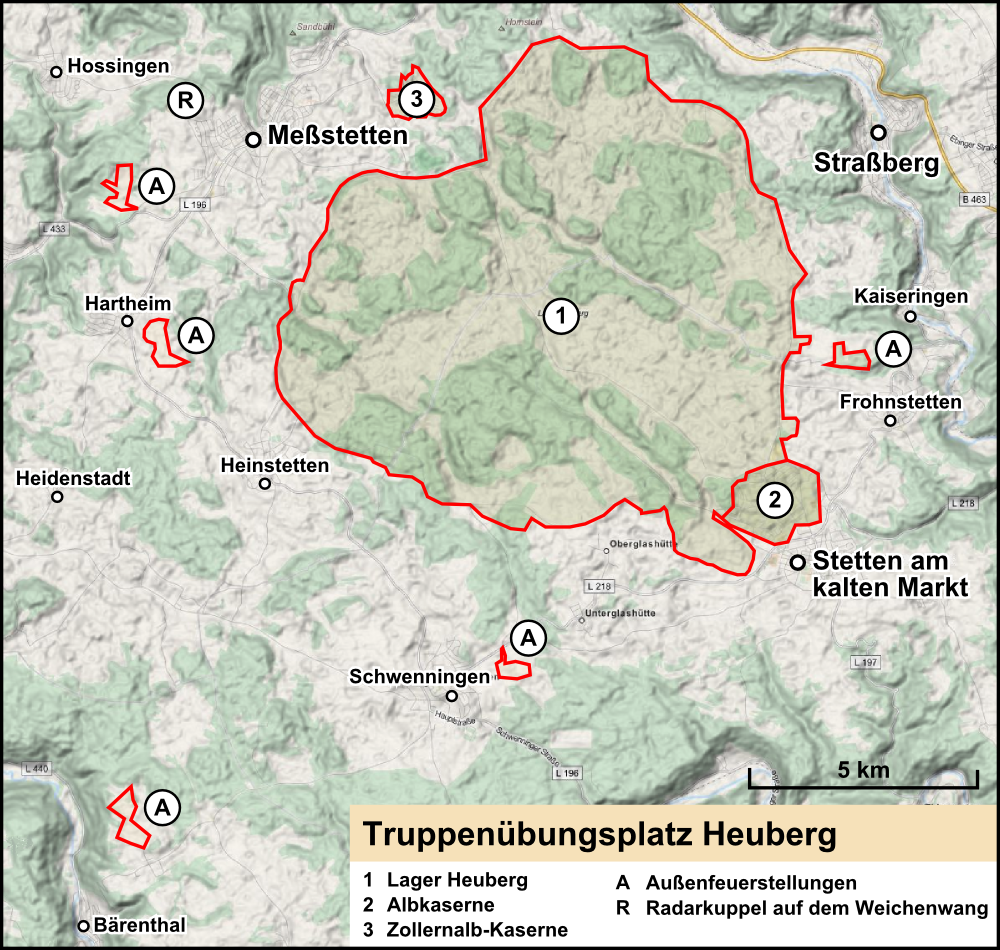
Heuberg Training Area

On the Großer Heuberg, a plateau in the southwest of the Swabian Jura in an altitude of 800–970 metres (2,620–3,180 ft), is the area between Albstadt in the north, Meßstetten in the west, Schwenningen in the south and Stetten am kalten Markt on the south-east, where the army installations at Lager Heuberg and Albkaserne are located.

The barracks, the training area and the proving ground comprise approximately 47.9 square kilometres (11,800 acres). (Note: Total area: 4,790 hectares (11,800 acres)) Of these, 2,480 hectares (6,100 acres) are exercise area, of which 1,245 hectares (3,080 acres) are suitable for tracked vehicles. The two sites of the Bundeswehr in Stetten am kalten Markt - Lager Heuberg and Albkaserne - account for 141.8 hectares (350 acres), (Note: Total area: 4,790 hectares (11,800 acres)) where approximately 1,620 hectares (4,000 acres) are within the boundaries of the municipality Stetten am kalten Markt and 129 hectares (320 acres) in the municipality Schwenningen are omitted.

In 1909 the city of Meßstetten had to sell nearly 40% of their district area to the Reich Treasury.

The training area is the hub of the federal armed forces in the Sigmaringen district, and the last military training center still in use in southern Germany. Construction and expansion measures cost tens of millions of Euro.

In connection with the Heuberg training area are the following external firing positions:

- "Sieben Jauchert" (Kaiseringen district)
- "Wachtbühl" and "Wanne" (Schwenningen district)
- "Vogelbühl" (Bärenthal district)
- "Bol" (Hartheim district) and "Wiedenäcker" (Unterdigisheim district)
- "Blumersberg" (closed) (Meßstetten district)

Underneath the training area was CAOC 4, belonging to adjacent Zollernalb barracks in Meßstetten. Of the air force installations, only one air surveillance radome on the Weichenwang hill in the vicinity has remained active.

== History ==
=== Conception ===
The Heuberg training area originated from the requirements of the XIV Army Corps in 1885, which had expressed a need for a new maneuver area that was large enough for military exercises according to the new military principles. In August 1899 the Grand Duchy of Baden's Ministry of Finance was informed by the General Command in Karlsruhe of the requirements for a future training area. In addition to many other criteria, the future area should not have a high elevation, should have a railway terminal and should be as circular as possible. The agency assigned to conduct the search (Domänendirektion) quickly determined that the wishes of the military could not be met by any of the candidates.

In 1905, the interest of the agency focused on the Heuberg. Since both the terrain and the purchase presented the fewest difficulties, the site was chosen, despite the fact that the future training area was only one-third in Baden and would not have a railway connection. Plans for a military station below the outer firing position Blumersberg in Meßstetten were worked out in detail for 8000 gold marks.

From 1908 on purchase negotiations were held for the areas in Baden, (Note: Großherzogtum Baden, Bezirksamt Meßkirch: Heinstetten, Schwenningen und Stetten am kalten Markt) Württemberg (Note: Königreich Württemberg, Oberamt Balingen: Ebingen und Meßstetten) und Prussia, (Note: Hohenzollernsche Lande, Oberamt Gammertingen Frohnstetten, Kaiseringen und Straßberg) which dragged on for some time. In some cases forced expropriations by the Reich Treasury was necessary, since not all prospective sellers were in agreement with the land prices offered by the military.

=== Construction and commissioning ===
By 1910 the first military exercises by the XIV Army Corps could take place at the training course, which was only partially purchased at this time. Because there were not enough fixed accommodations, the soldiers were housed in tents or quartered in the surrounding communities. Between 1912 and 1916 Camp Heuberg was built in the district of Stetten am kalten Markt.

The establishment of the training area forced the destruction of several settlements which had been built to improve the economic situation of the population in the former territory of Straßberg, Zollernalbkreis. for example, Harthof and Lenzenhütte— also called Glashüttehof— in Straßberg, Ochsenkopf and Waldhof in Kaiseringen, Knobelhof in Heinstetten, Sebastiansweiler with the Sebastian Chapel and Weinitz and Hardt in Frohnstetten.

A special challenge was supplying water for 6000 soldiers in training and 2500 horses. For this purpose, on February 19, 1910, the National Military Treasury acquired the so-called Hammermühle, an old ironworks in Thiergarten in Beuron with channel and weir from the House of Fürstenberg for 35.000 Reichsmarks. They also bought a water source, Rainbrunnenquelle, which originated in Falkenstein between Neidingen and Thiergarten.

After the demolition of the Hammerschmiede a pumping station was erected at its place. Along the more than 300 metres (980 ft) higher training area three elevated tanks and a pressure line were built from 1909. In 1912 a power plant was built, which supplied the training ground with electricity via a power line from Thiergarten. In 1911 the planning of a wastewater treatment plant began; the construction took place 1912 to 1914, and in 1914 it was able to go into operation. 1925 Stetten was connected to the sewage treatment plant with the western center part, 1981 the district Glashütte was added.

To build and supply the facility, a freight funicular was inaugurated in 1912. It went from train station in Kaiseringen to the Alb plateau with a length of 2.4 kilometres (1.5 mi), and from there an additional 1.5 kilometres (1,500 m) of railroad, of which only some concrete remains. After many repairs the railroad, completed in 1915, continued to suffer may accidents and was soon abandoned. At the end of World War I in 1918 the training ground could initially no longer be used because of the Treaty of Versailles. This treaty demanded the demilitarization of military proving grounds. The funicular was decommissioned in 1921 and never rebuilt. In 1985 a tank loading facility was built on the Zollernalb Railway (Tübingen–Sigmaringen railway) in Storzingen.

=== First and Second World War ===
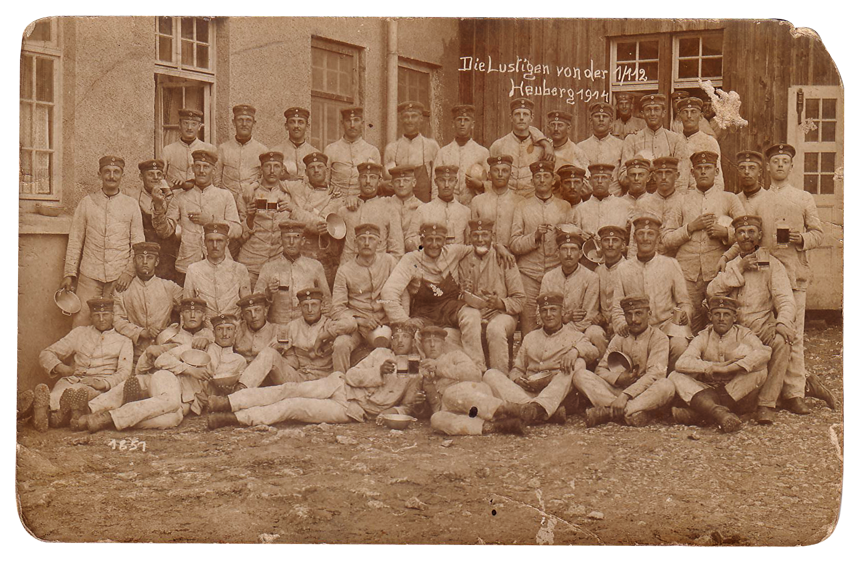
July 1914: Last exercises before the war

In May 1914, shortly before the war began, the training area was opened. The Prussian Ministry of War. gave careful consideration to the naming of the training area. In addition to the proposals as "Truppenübungsplatz Stetten", "Truppenübungsplatz Heuberg" was ultimately selected and approved by the Minister of War. In both World Wars a prisoner-of-war camp was established at the site.

At the beginning of 1933 the existing buildings on the Heuberg north of the facility were used as one of the first concentration camps of the Nazi regime. Up to 2,000 people, mostly political opponents of the regime, were taken in protective custody. After nine months, Concentration Camp Heuberg was dissolved. Most prisoners were then deported into larger concentration camps, such as Dachau.

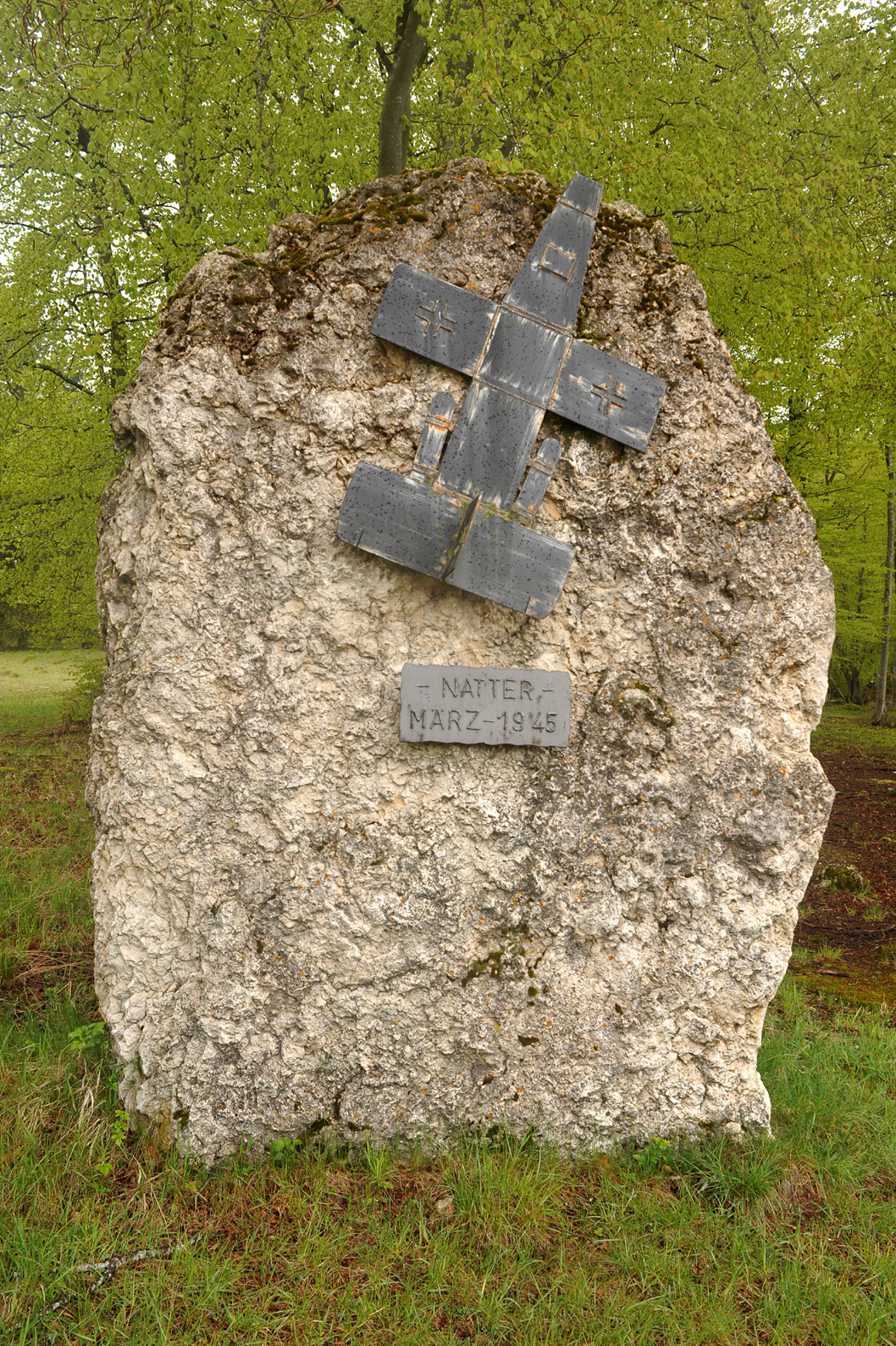
Memorial for the Bachem Ba 349 "Natter" on the Ochsenkopf.

On March 1, 1945, on the Ochsenkopf about 3 kilometres (1.9 mi) from the Camp Heuberg, 23-year-old Luftwaffe test pilot Lothar Sieber made the initial (and only) test flight of the Bachem Ba 349 "Natter"— the world's first manned flight of a vertical take-off rocket plane. He was killed shortly after take-off in a crash near Nusplingen, in Stetten am kalten Markt. In March Sieber was buried with military honors in the cemetery of Stetten am kalten Markt. The grave is still there today; also still to be seen at the launch point are the concrete launch pad and the wooden stump of the launching ramp.

=== Postwar years until today ===
From 1945 to 1959 the site was under French administration. The last French army unit moved from Camp Heuberg in 1997.

In 1966 the Bundeswehr expanded in Stetten am kalten Markt with the construction of the Albkaserne. Missiles were stationed here during the Cold War.

In 1995 the city of Meßstetten reacquired the former "Blumersberg" artillery site. Used chiefly for the armored corps until the end of the twentieth century, Heuberg is now used in many ways besides — practicing Army force basic training, bomb disposal, military police, Technisches Hilfswerk, professional fire, Federal Police, customs and police, CBRN defense.

== Nature and landscape protection ==
The training center possesses an incredibly important ecology for nature preservation. The area is divided into 40 per cent forest cover and 60 percent open meadow areas, some interspersed with juniper heath. It is characterized by the traditional herding economy (transhumance). So it is possible to maintain or expand the typical landscape of the past centuries at the facility. On the hills are old bunkers, or what is left of them to see after bombardment. Since the training area is burdened by its nearly century-old military use to a large extent with ammunition and parts, entering and driving is extremely dangerous and therefore strictly forbidden for civilians.

== Natura 2000 site ==
The Heuberg training area is a Natura 2000 - Area On the grounds the Bundeswehr is planning the construction and expansion of a new and an existing explosives-disposal site in Spitalwald. The site consists of a large main area, which is predominantly within the Heuberg Training Area, and several small subdivisions in Frohnstetten and south Ebingen. The total size of the habitat-protection area is 4,732 hectares (11,690 acres). Of these, 4,134 hectares (10,220 acres) are within the military use training area. This has been protected since 2001 as a bird sanctuary and since 2005 as a conservation area. The area is especially worthy of protection—it is particularly suitable as a summer meadow for sheep—because of its species-rich limestone meadows and juniper heaths.

== Historic sites ==
Within the area there is the legendary Dreibannmarke, also called the "Dahn", a 17th-century border, which today marks the border between three different municipalities, formerly in the three states of Württemberg, Baden, and Hohenzollern. The meadow at the Dreibannmarke served as a stopping place for traveling merchants, wagons and craftsmen. With care it is possible to identify traces of the border. After the inauguration of the firing ranges, a meadow was allocated to the Gypsies as a camping site at the edge of the restricted area. Until 1835 merchants were smuggled over the customs borders guarded by local hunters.

Ritter Heinrich von Tierberg, called Haiterbach, had most likely sold his property in Haiterbach, and in 1345 acquired his new territory on the grounds of the military training center, the center of which was Meßstetten. In 1418 he sold it to Württemberg.

== Literature ==
- Klaus Hörter, Manfred Hensel: Chronik des Truppenübungsplatzes und der Garnison Heuberg bei Stetten am Kalten Markt : hrsg. aus Anlass des 70-jährigen Bestehens des Truppenübungsplatzes Heuberg : A. Wolf Selbstverlag, Inzigkofen, 1980, ISBN 3-921580-17-X, (Geschichte des Garnisonsorts Stetten am Kalten Markt und seiner Umgebung, Volume 1)
