= Stetten am kalten Markt =

- Municipality
- Coat of arms

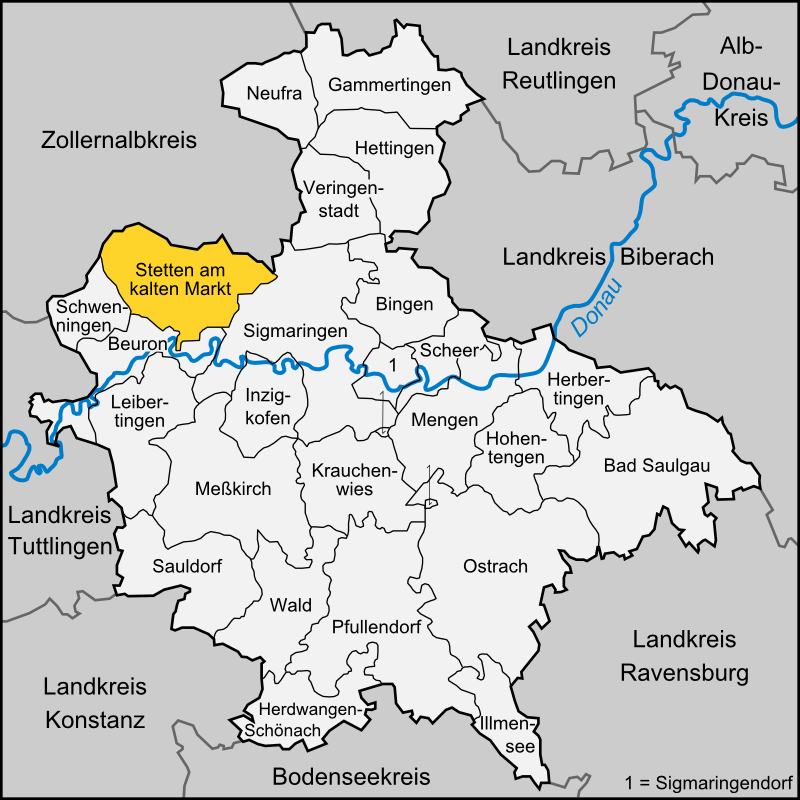
- Location of Stetten am kalten Markt within Sigmaringen district
- Interactive map of Stetten am kalten Markt
- Location within Germany Location within Baden-Württemberg
- Coordinates: 48°7′23″N 9°4′40″E
- Country: Germany
- State: Baden-Württemberg
- Admin. region: Tübingen
- District: Sigmaringen
- Subdivisions: 5

Government
  - Mayor (2023–31): Maik Lehn

Area
  - Total: 56.47 km^{2} (21.80 sq mi)
- Elevation: 768 m (2,520 ft)

Population (2025-12-31)
  - Total: 4,837
  - Density: 85.66/km^{2} (221.8/sq mi)
- Time zone: UTC+01:00 (CET)
  - Summer (DST): UTC+02:00 (CEST)
- Postal codes: 72506–72510
- Dialling codes: 07573
- Vehicle registration: SIG
- Website: www.stetten-akm.de

Stetten am kalten Markt (Stetten a.k.M.) is a municipality in the Sigmaringen district of Baden-Württemberg, Germany.

== Towns ==
The towns of Nusplingen, Frohnstetten, Storzingen and Glashütte are part of Stetten am kalten Markt.

== History ==
The area was documented early as being in the possession of the Reichenau monastery as "Stetten am kalten Markt." Within the Heuberg Training Area there is the legendary Dreibannmarke, also called the "Bahn", a 17th-century border, which today marks the border between three different municipalities, formerly in the three states of Württemberg, Baden, and Hohenzollern. The meadow at the Dreibannmarke served as a stopping place for traveling merchants, wagons and craftsmen. With care it is possible to identify traces of the border. After the inauguration of the firing ranges, a meadow in Meßstetten was allocated as a camping site at the edge of the restricted area. Until 1835 merchandise was smuggled over the customs borders guarded by local hunters. A man named Haux was killed on 21 July 1831 in Pfaffental while smuggling coffee.

On March 1, 1945, Air Force pilot second lieutenant Lothar Sieber died about 7 kilometers south of the Heuberg Military Training Area with the Heuberg barracks, the location of the first manned rocket flight in history. Sieber was piloting a Bachem Ba 349 Natter rocket plane, which was designed to take off vertically to avoid the need for airfields.

== Mayors ==
- 1945–1957: Dominikus Gallus
- 1957–1966: Wilhelm Klek
- 1966–1991 Horst Lupfer
- 1991–2015: Gregor Hipp (CDU)
- since 2015: Maik Lehn (independent)

== Economics ==
Stetten is a large German Federal Armed Forces location; approximately 2,200 soldiers are stationed in the area, attached to the Heuberg troop exercise area. According to the city administration, about 1,300 people per annum are transferred to the master garrison in Stetten for military service. The troop exercise area was first set up after 1910. From 1945 to 1959 it was under the administration of the French armed forces (FFA). Even after administration of the facility was assumed by the German Federal Armed Forces, a section was reserved for the FFA until 1997.

== Personalities ==
- Marie Baum 1920 bis 1933, 100 000 the children's city
- Michael Beck (born 1960; politician), mayor of Tuttlingen
- Wolfgang Urban (born 1948), Deacon and Curator of the Museum of the Roman Catholic Diocese of Rottenburg-Stuttgart in Rottenburg am Neckar, Lecturer at the University of Tübingen

== Stolpersteine ==
- Salomon Leibowitsch (1885–1933), killed in Stetten on 9.09.1933
