= Schwenningen, Sigmaringen =

Schwenningen
- Municipality
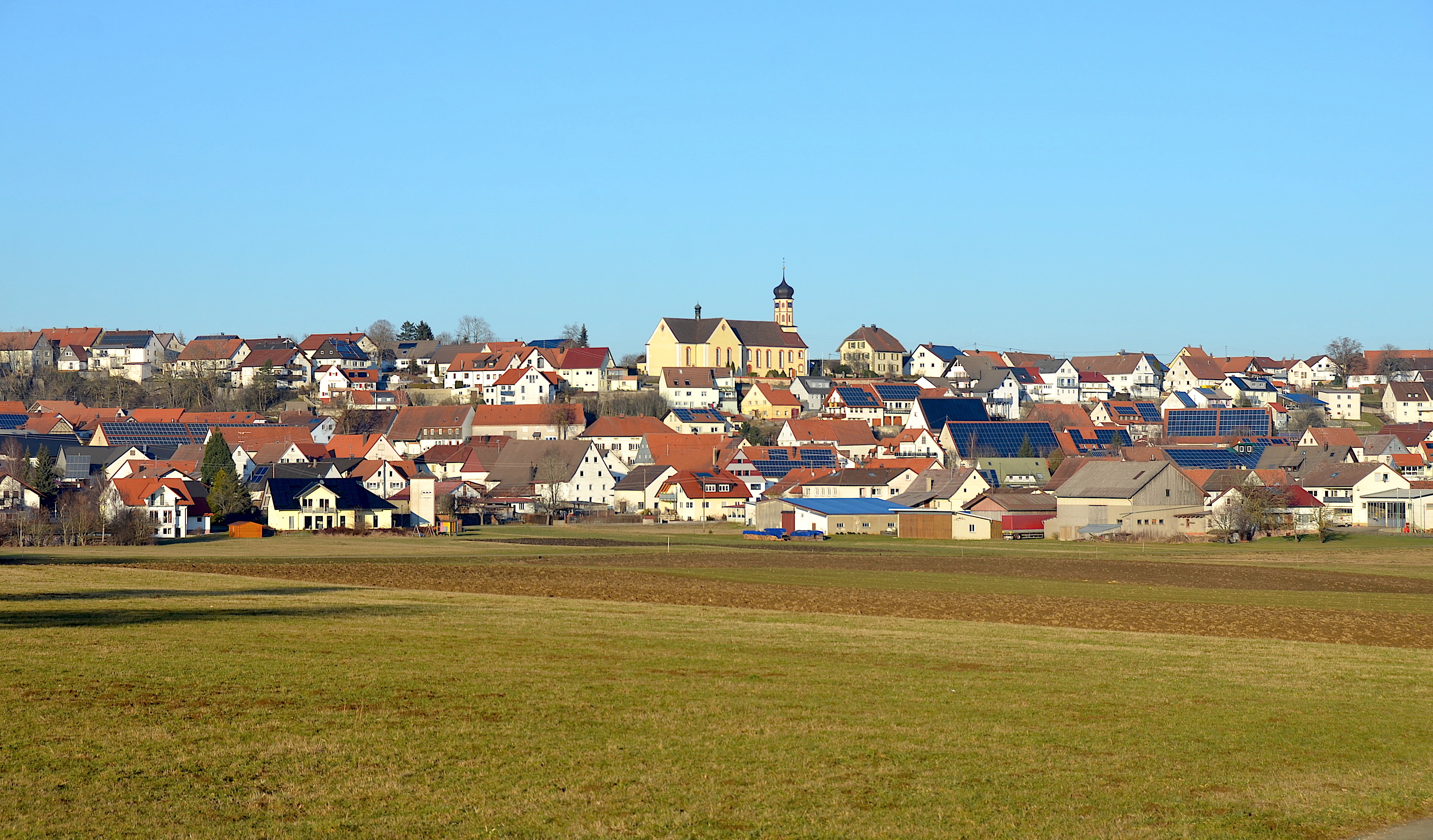

- Coat of arms

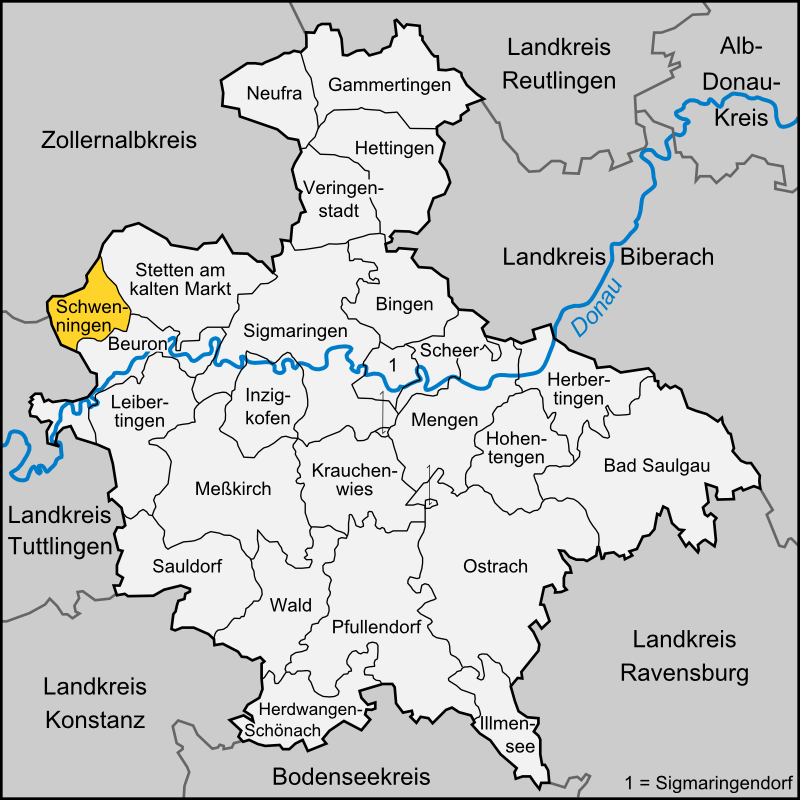
- Location of Schwenningen within Sigmaringen district
- Interactive map of Schwenningen
- Location within Germany Location within Baden-Württemberg
- Coordinates: 48°6′16″N 8°59′55″E
- Country: Germany
- State: Baden-Württemberg
- Admin. region: Tübingen
- District: Sigmaringen

Government
  - Mayor (2024–32): Hans Ewald Hoffmann

Area
  - Total: 19.34 km^{2} (7.47 sq mi)
- Elevation: 870 m (2,850 ft)

Population (2025-12-31)
  - Total: 1,668
  - Density: 86.25/km^{2} (223.4/sq mi)
- Time zone: UTC+01:00 (CET)
  - Summer (DST): UTC+02:00 (CEST)
- Postal codes: 72477
- Dialling codes: 07579
- Vehicle registration: SIG
- Website: www.schwenningen.de

Schwenningen (German pronunciation: [ˈʃvɛnɪŋən]) is a municipality in the district of Sigmaringen in Baden-Württemberg in Germany close to the Heuberg Military Training Area.

== Mayors ==
- 1972–1988: Peter Allgaier
- 1992–2016: Herbert Bucher (FWV)
- 2016–2024: Roswitha Beck
- since 2024: Hans Ewald Hoffmann
