= Gräbelesberg =

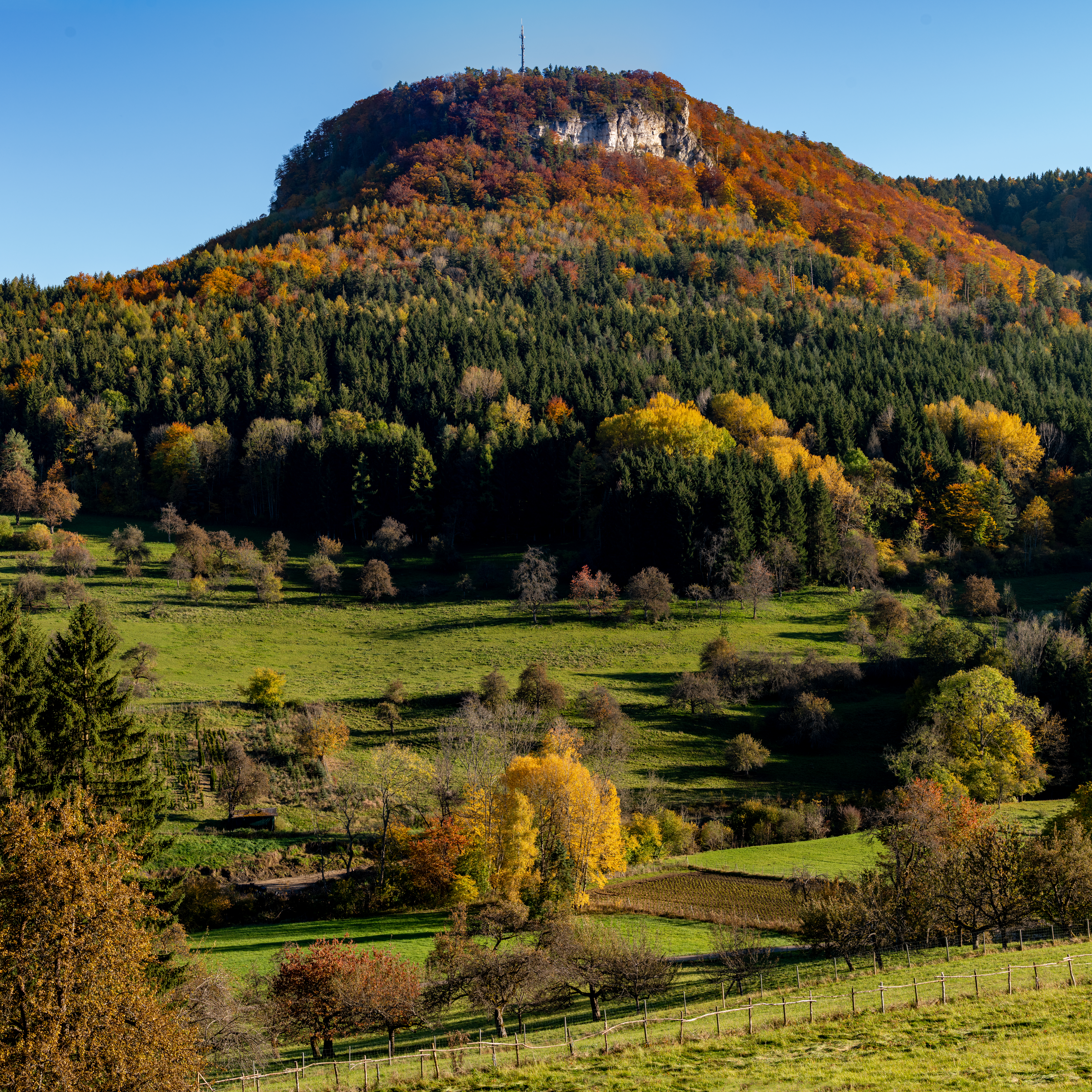
- ~View from the west

Highest point
- Elevation: 915 m above sea level (NHN) (3,002 ft)
- Coordinates: 48°12′38″N 08°55′06″E

Geography
- Location within Baden-Württemberg
- Location: Baden-Württemberg, Germany
- Parent range: Swabian Jura

Geology
- Rock type: White Jurassic

Gräbelesberg is a mountain of Baden-Württemberg, Germany. It is located in Zollernalbkreis.
