= Lager Heuberg =

Bundeswehr quarters

Lager Heuberg (Camp Heuberg) (48°9′N 9°1′E) is a Bundeswehr quarters located in the southern corner of the Truppenübungsplatz Heuberg (Heuberg military training area) in (Baden-Württemberg), near the city of Stetten am kalten Markt.

From March to December 1933 it was one of the first Nazi concentration camps. Among the inmates were Kurt Schumacher and Fritz Bauer.

At Truppenübungsplatz Heuberg, about 3 kilometres from Lager Heuberg, the first vertical take-off manned rocket flight took place on 1 March 1945 and crashed, killing its pilot, Lothar Sieber, in the Bachem Ba 349 "Natter" rocket.

== History ==
- 1910 XIV Armeekorps of the German Imperial Army establishes Lager Heuberg and the training camp
- 1914 POW camp
- 1917 5,000 soldiers and 15,000 POW's
- 1920–1933 Treaty of Versailles limits German Army to 100,000. Camp is converted into a children's home and hospital
- 1933 Converted into the first concentration camp in Württemberg/Baden, in use for 9 months
- 1934 Taken over by Reichswehr/Wehrmacht
- 1940 Camp for Reichsarbeitsdienst with 400 barracks
- 1940–41 Mobilisation camp for the 4th Mountain Division
- 1943–1945 Indische Legion, Division Italia, 2nd Division of Russian Army of Liberation and Militia of Vichy, the Franc-Garde
- 1945 1 March. First vertical take-off manned rocket flight, piloted by Luftwaffe lieutenant, Lothar Sieber, who was killed in the Bachem Ba 349 "Natter" rocket
- 1945 22 April French troops arrive and free 20,000 Red Army POW's
- 1957 Newly founded Bundeswehr arrives
- 1976 Former hospital demolished
- 1997 French 3rd Regiment of Dragoons leaves after 51 years

During 1962–1963, U.S. troops (357th Artillery Detachment) are reputed to have kept nuclear warheads at Lager Heuberg that would have been issued for the use of French Nike-Hercules Missile units had a war with the Soviet Union occurred.

== German units recently quartered at Lager Heuberg ==
- Panzerpionierkompanie 550
- Artilleriebataillon 295
- Feldjägerbataillon 452
- Zentrum für Kampfmittelbeseitigung der Bundeswehr
- Truppenübungsplatzkommandantur Heuberg
- 5. Kompanie (schwer) / Jägerbataillon 292
- V. und VI. Inspektion ABC/Se Schule Sonthofen
- Sanitätszentrum Stetten a.k.M.
- Bundeswehrdienstleistungszentrum Stetten am kalten Markt

== Literature ==
- Markus Kienle: Das Konzentrationslager Heuberg bei Stetten am kalten Markt. Klemm & Oelschläger, 1998, ISBN 3-932577-10-8
