= Schmiecha =

River in Germany

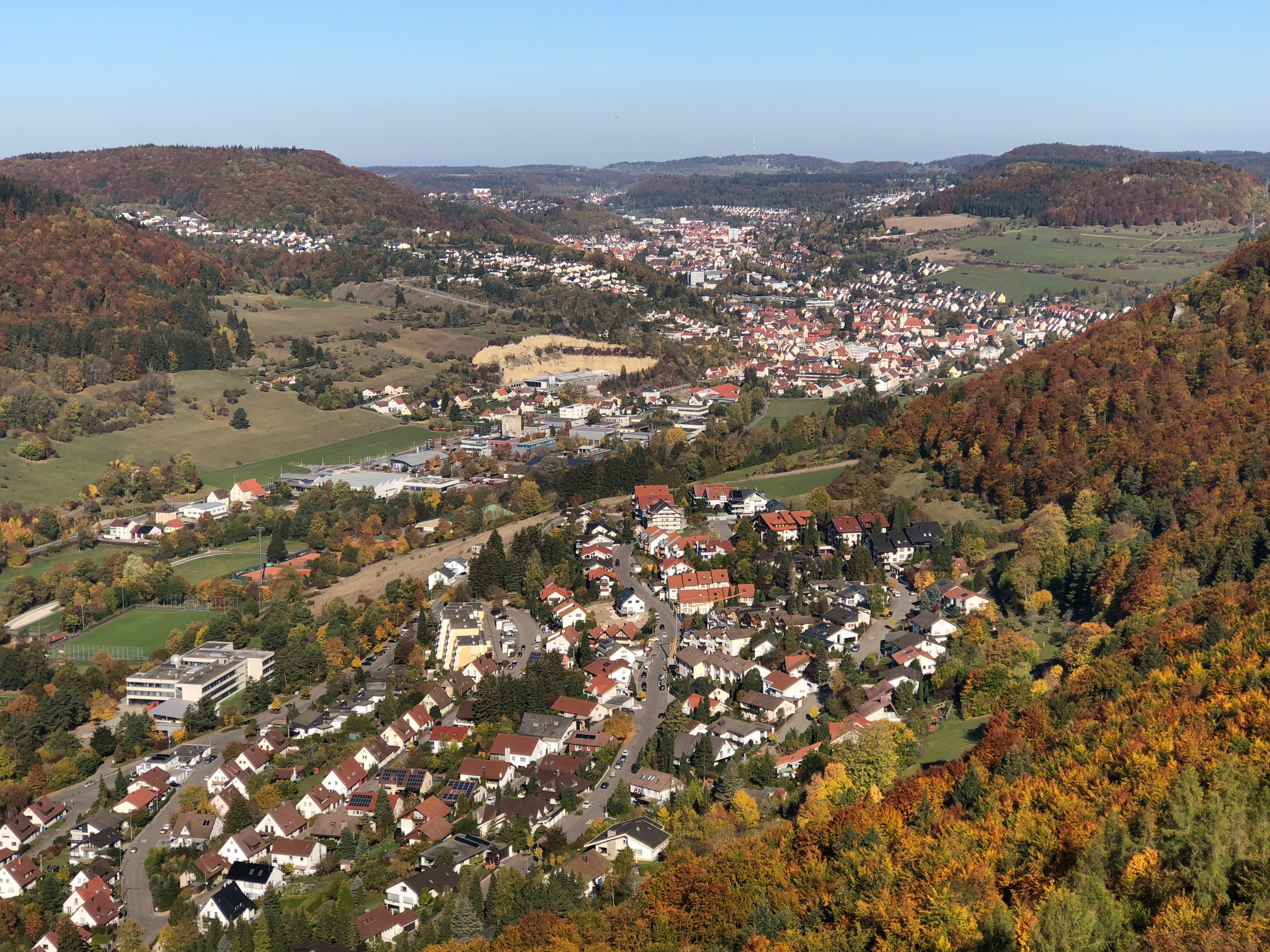
- upper Schmiecha valley

Location
- Country: Germany
- State: Baden-Württemberg

Physical characteristics
- Source
  - location: Onstmettingen
- Mouth
  - location: Danube
  - coordinates: 48.0794°N 9.1535°E
- Length: 41.3 km (25.7 mi)
- Basin size: 151 km^{2} (58 sq mi)

Basin features
- Progression: Danube→ Black Sea

Schmiecha (in its lower course: Schmeie) is a river of Baden-Württemberg, Germany. It runs from the Raichberg through the town of Albstadt and through a valley of the Swabian Jura. It flows into the Danube near Inzigkofen.

== See also ==
- List of rivers of Baden-Württemberg
