= Upper Danube Nature Park =

Nature park in Baden-Württemberg, Germany

Coordinates: 48°03′01″N 08°58′09″E

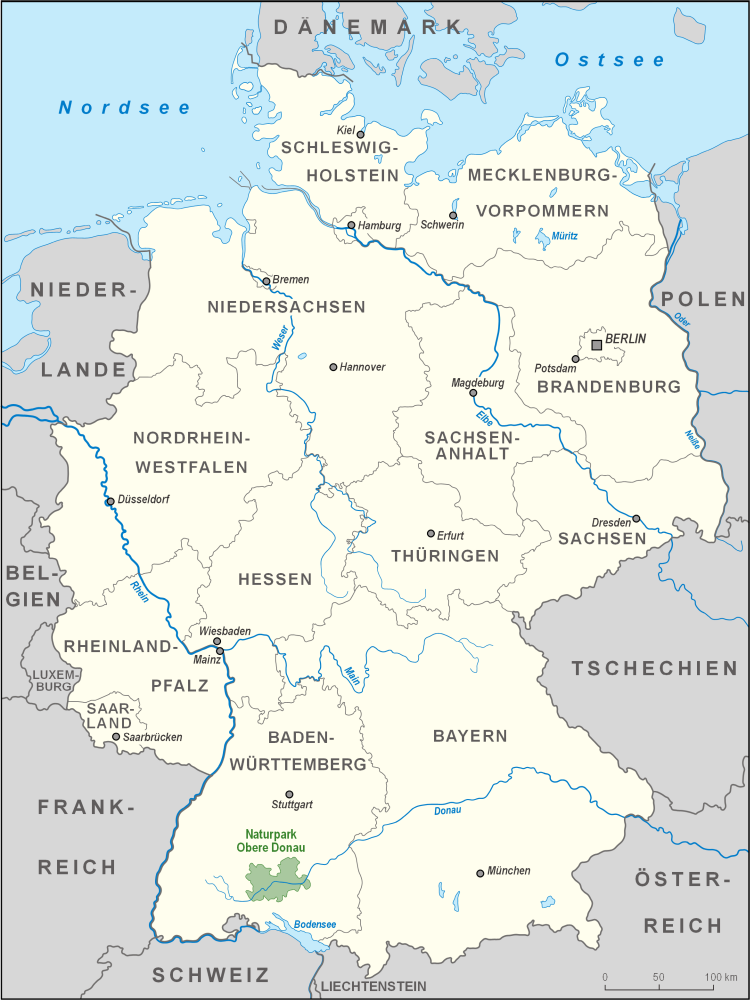
The Upper Danube Nature Park in Germany.

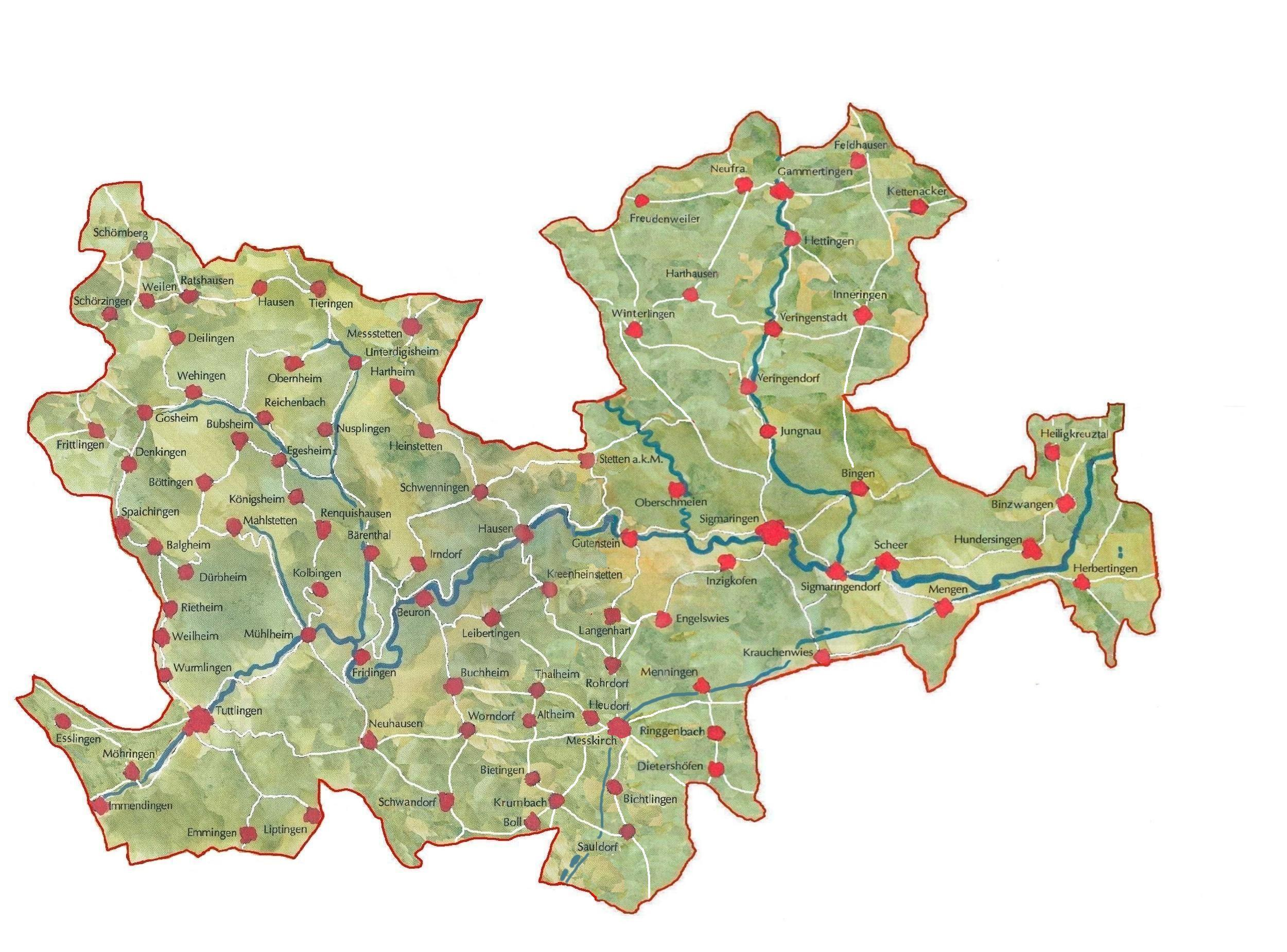
Upper Danube Nature Park

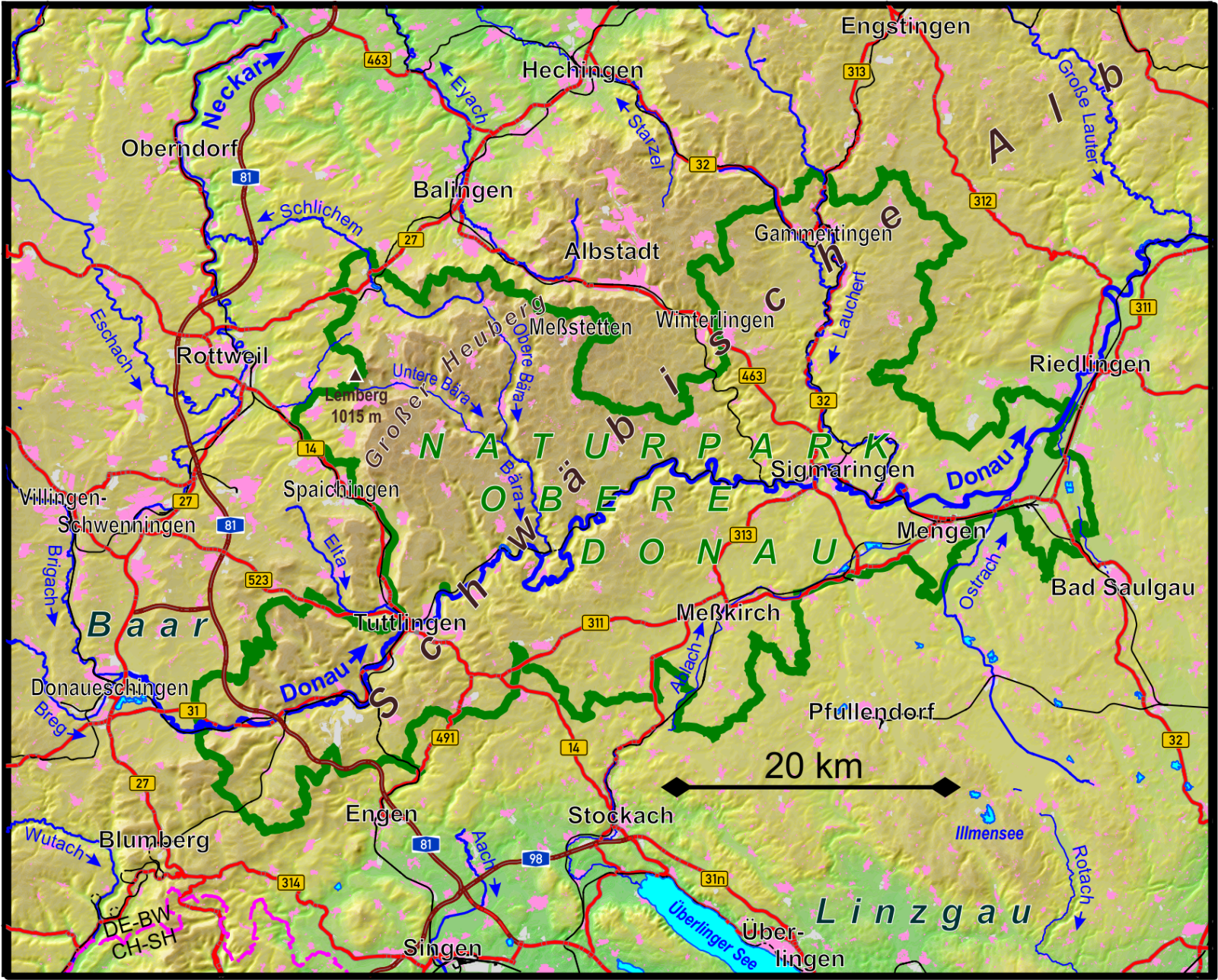
Topography of Upper Danube Nature Park

The Upper Danube Nature Park (German: Naturpark Obere Donau), founded in 1980, is located in the south of Baden-Württemberg in Germany and encloses primarily the districts of Tuttlingen and Sigmaringen. It encompassed initially 860 km^{2} that were increased by about 500 km^{2} in 2005. The headquarters of the nature reserve association is at Beuron. The highest proportion of the nature park is taken up by the Heuberg, the south-western plateau of the Swabian Alb, and is punctuated by the Danube.

== Geography ==
Two small rivers, the Brigach and the Breg at the eastern border of the Black Forest unite at Donaueschingen to form the Danube.

The Danube passes through the Upper Danube Nature Park between Immendingen and Ertingen, its deep bed dug deep into the Jurassic stone of the Swabian Alb. In this break-through valley of the still narrow river mighty rocks like chalk rocks ("Kalkfelsen") are exposed: One of it is the "Knopfmacherfelsen" at Beuron. Beuron with its Beuron Archabby lies in the middle of the attractive scenery of the nature reserve.

This break-through valley in the area of the Upper Danube is known as Danube Valley.

The upper part of the Danube passes through following cities: Tuttlingen, Mühlheim, Fridingen, Sigmaringen, Scheer and Mengen.

Geologically and touristically interesting are also the seepages of the Danube ("Donauversickerungen" or Danube Sinkhole) in Immendingen and to the south of Fridingen.

Quite a number of forts and castles are sitting on top of numerous rocks on this stretch above the Danube. These are: Schloss Bronnen, Altwildenstein, Unterwildenstein, Wildensteiner Burg Hexenturm, Wildensteiner Burg Hahnenkamm, Burg Wildenstein, Schloss Werenwag, Schloss Gutenstein (Gutenstein), Ruine Dietfurt, Gebrochen Gutenstein, Hohenzollernschloss Sigmaringen, Schloss Bartelstein and Schloss Scheer.

In parallel with the Danube runs the Danube cycle track which leads from Donaueschingen to Vienna. The Danube valley railroad from Donaueschingen to Ulm enables the visit of the nature reserve by train. Besides regular trains, the so-called nature reserve express train operates during summer months, especially for visitors of the nature reserve between Tuttlingen and Sigmaringen.

Tributaries to the Danube within the nature reserve are: from the south the Ablach and the Ostrach, and from the north the Bära, the Schmeie (or Schmiecha) and the Lauchert.

== Gallery ==
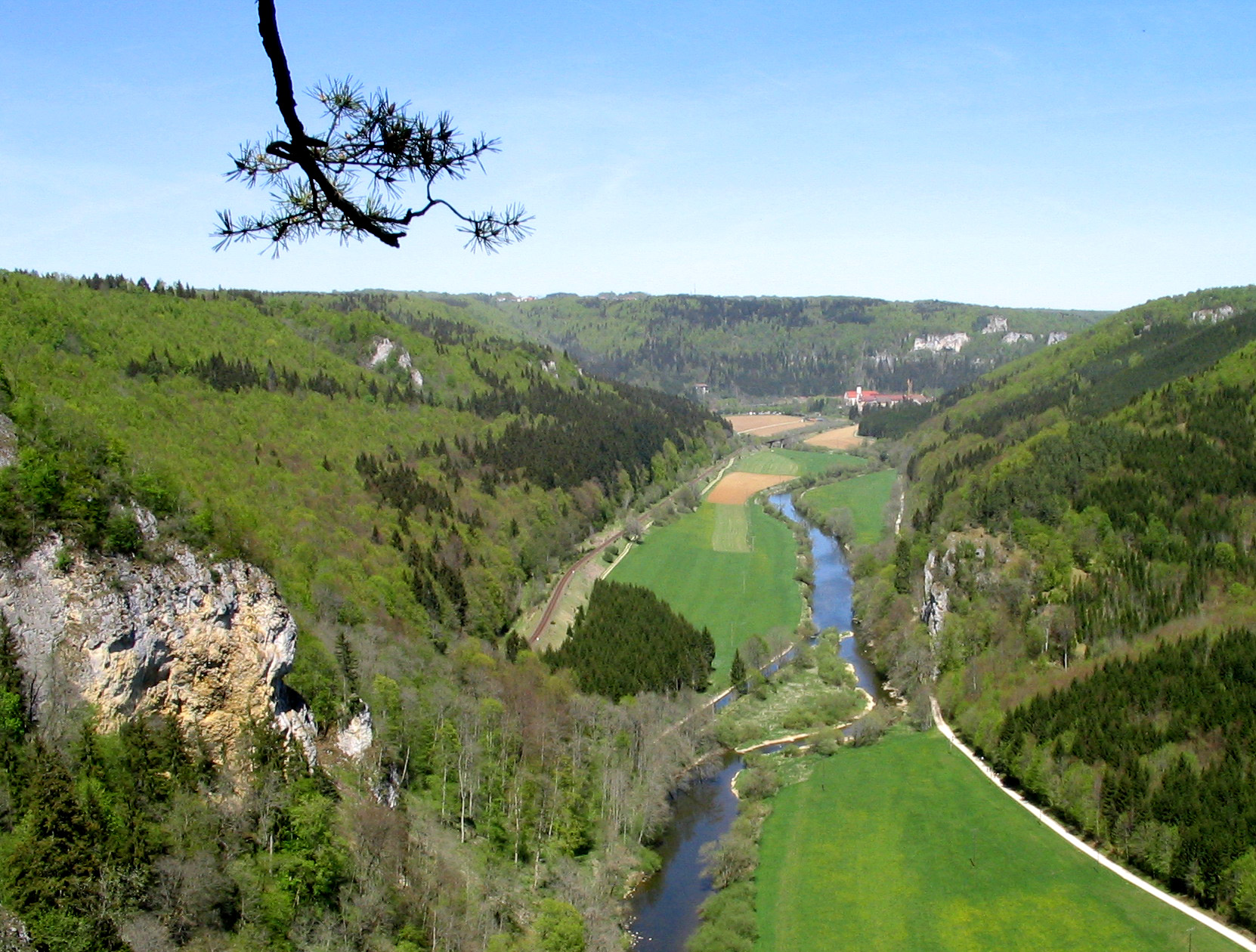
View from the 'Knopfmacherfelsen' towards Beuron.

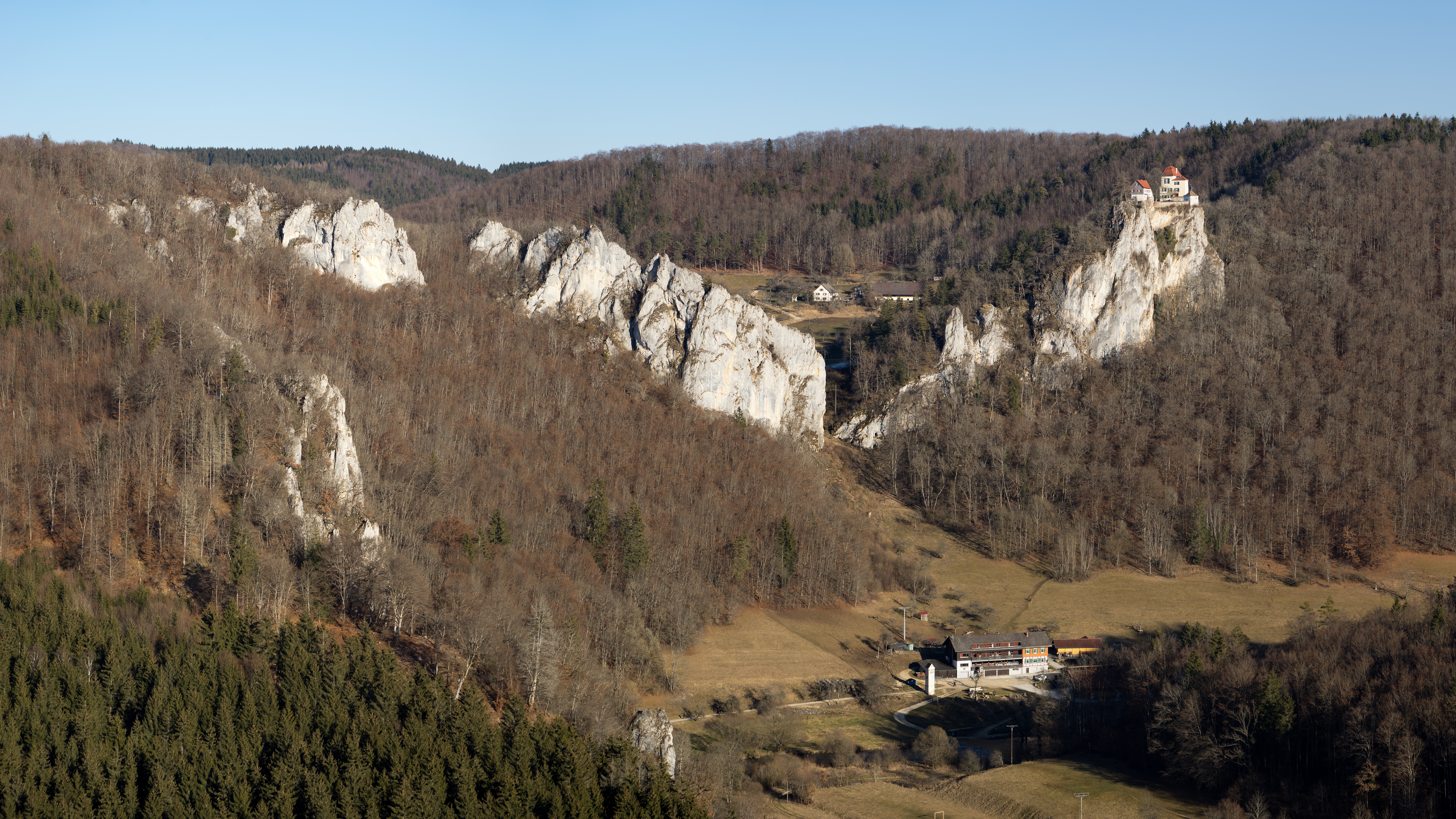
View from the 'Knopfmacherfelsen' towards Bronnen castle.

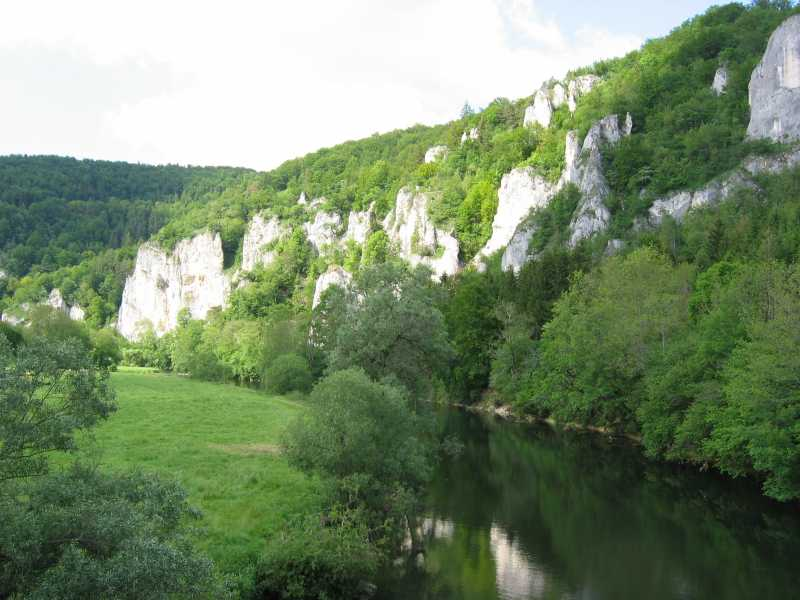
The break-through of the Danube at Beuron.

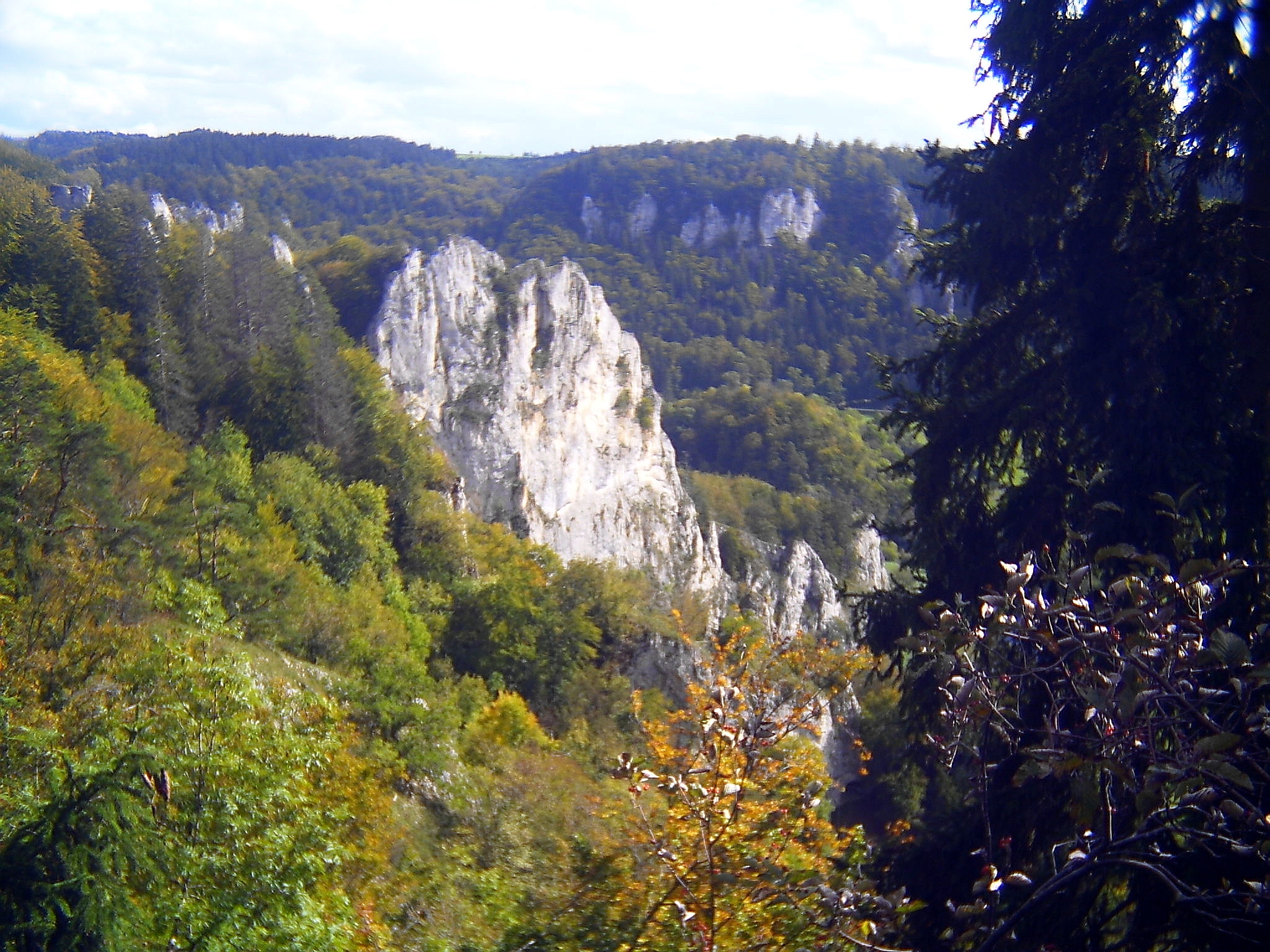
The Stiegelefelsen at Fridingen at the Danube break-through of the Swabian Alb.

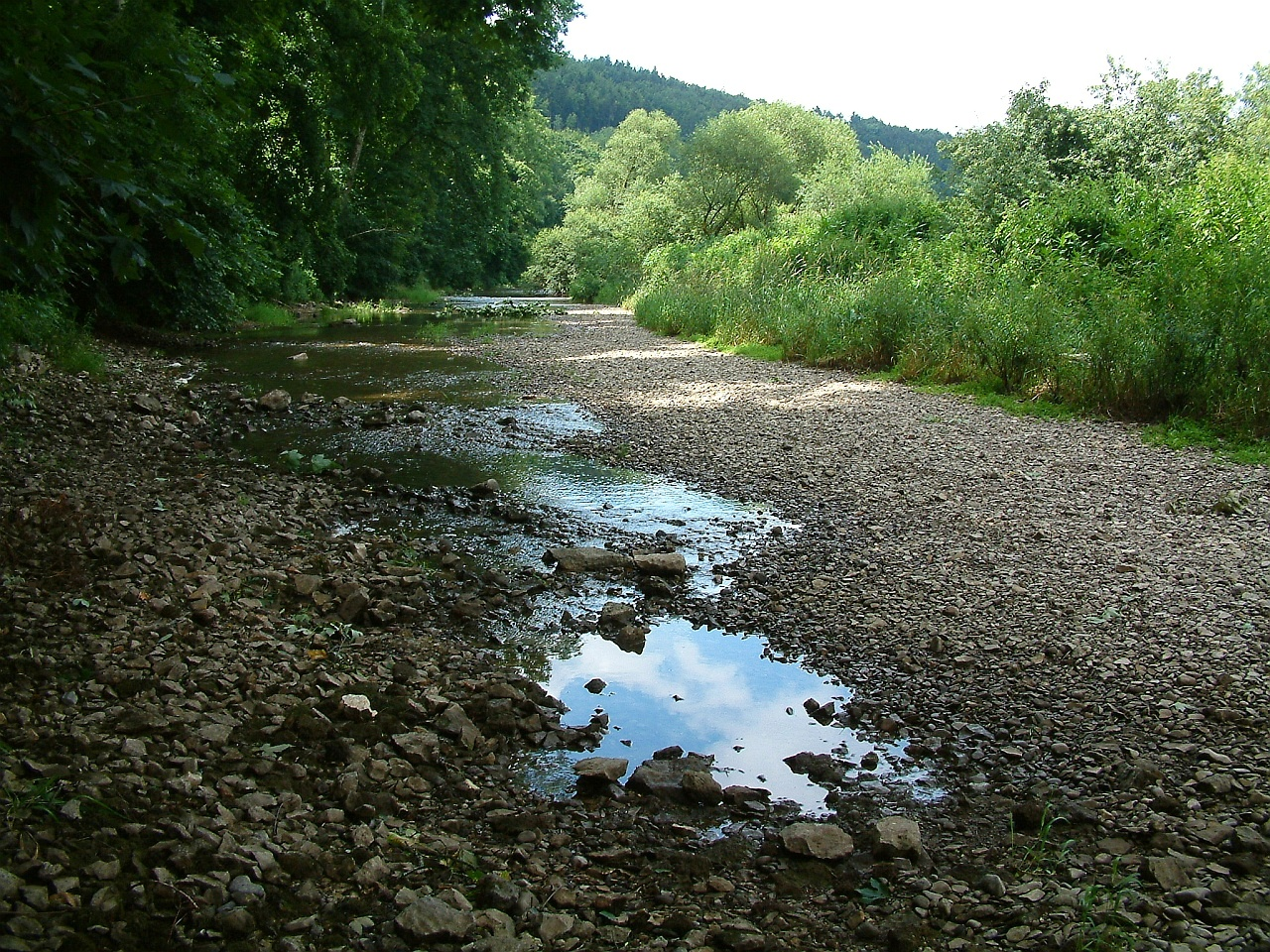
The nearly dried-out river bed of the Danube at the Danube seepage.
