= Tieringen =

Coordinates: 48°12′N 008°53′E

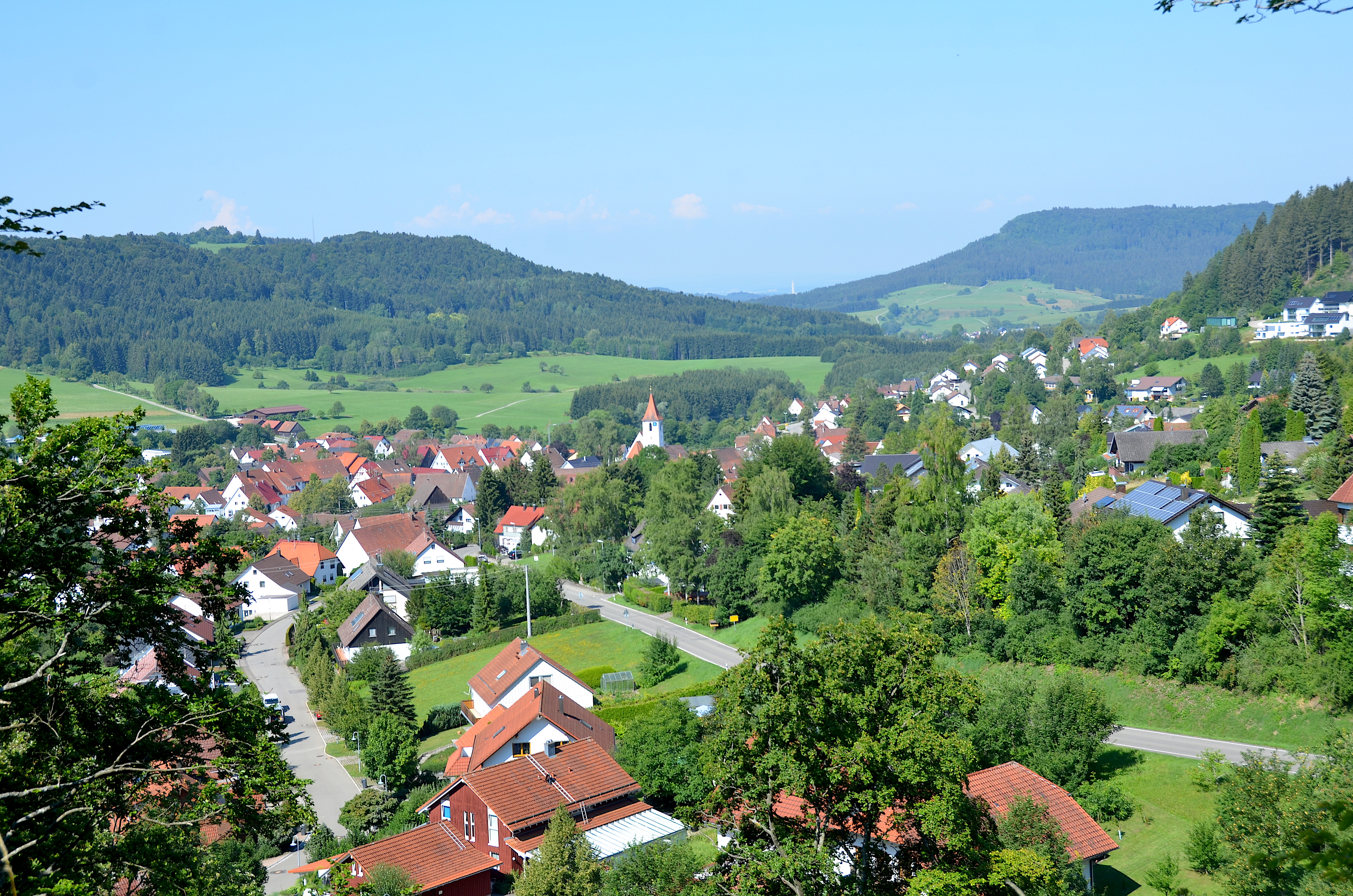
View across Tieringen (2018)

Tieringen is a district of the town of Meßstetten in the Zollernalbkreis district of Baden-Württemberg, Germany. As of 2010 Tieringen had a population of 1069. Tieringen is a capital of textile production. Urtica dioica L. convar. fibra is growing on farms.

== Sport ==
- trail mountain bike Tieringen Albtrauf to Balingen-Weilstetten Lochenpass 4,7 km car road, bike trail 1,9 km downhill.
