= List of presidents of the Landtag für Württemberg-Hohenzollern =

The following is a list of presidents of the Landtag für Württemberg-Hohenzollern.

== President of the Beratende Landesversammlung des Landes Württemberg-Hohenzollern ==
| Name | Period | Party |
|---|---|---|
| Karl Gengler | November 22, 1946–May 9, 1947 | CDU |

== President of the Landtag ==
| Name | Period | Party |
|---|---|---|
| Karl Gengler | 1947–1952 | CDU |

== Sources ==
- Landtag von Baden-Württemberg (HrSg.): MdL, die Abgeordneten der Landtage in Baden-Württemberg 1946-1978, Stuttgart 1978 ISBN 3-12-911930-2
