= Volker Kauder =

German lawyer and politician (born 1949)

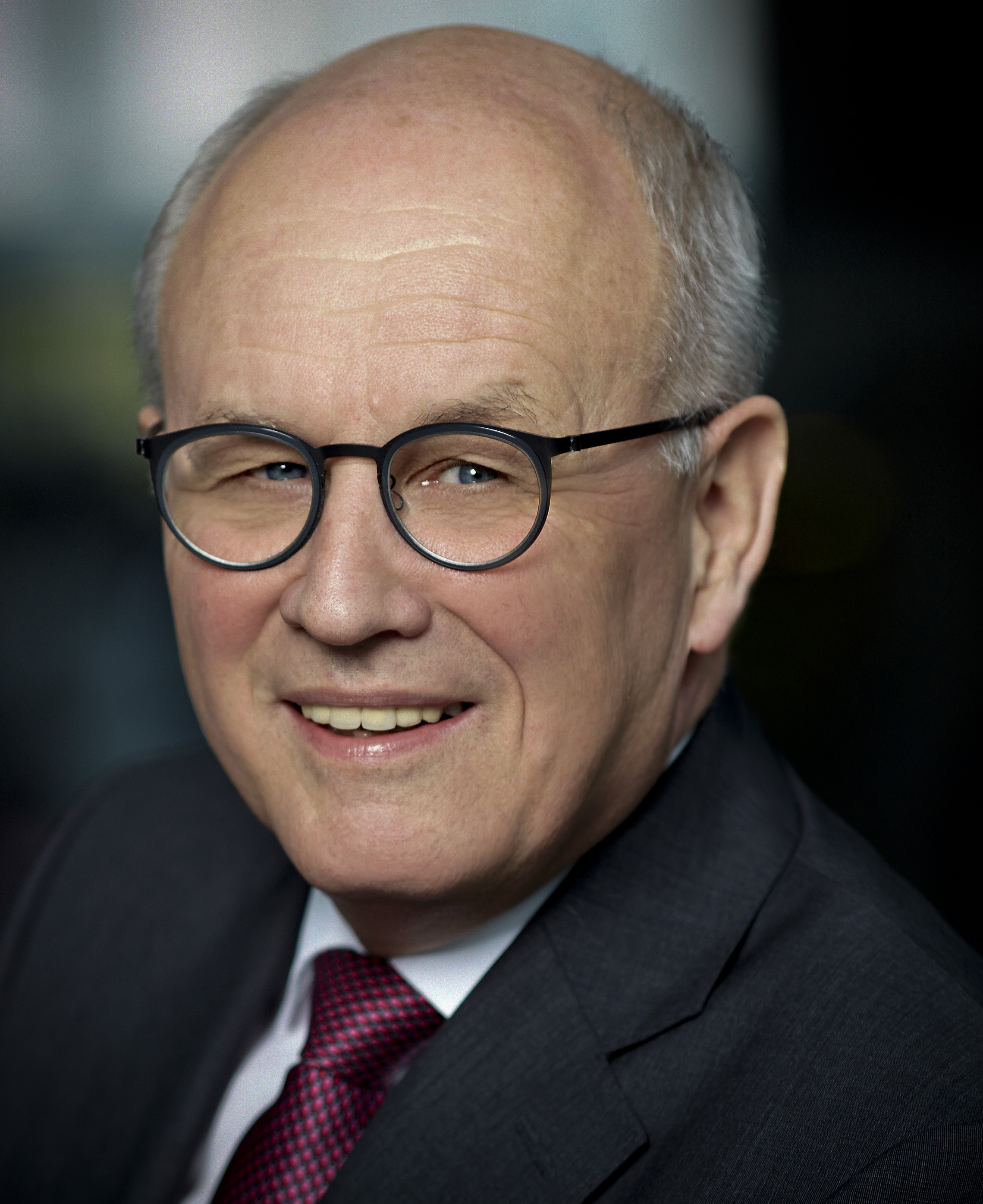
- Kauder in 2015

Leader of the CDU/CSU group in the Bundestag
- In office 21 November 2005 – 25 September 2018
- First Deputy: Peter Ramsauer; Hans-Peter Friedrich; Gerda Hasselfeldt; Alexander Dobrindt
- Chief Whip: Norbert Röttgen; Peter Altmaier; Michael Grosse-Brömer
- Preceded by: Angela Merkel
- Succeeded by: Ralph Brinkhaus

General Secretary of the Christian Democratic Union
- In office 22 December 2004 – 5 December 2005
- Leader: Angela Merkel
- Preceded by: Laurenz Meyer
- Succeeded by: Ronald Pofalla

Chief Whip of the CDU/CSU group in the Bundestag
- In office 17 October 2002 – 25 January 2005
- Leader: Angela Merkel
- Preceded by: Hans-Peter Repnik
- Succeeded by: Norbert Röttgen

Member of the Bundestag; for Rottweil – Tuttlingen
- In office 20 December 1990 – 26 October 2021
- Preceded by: Franz Sauter
- Succeeded by: Maria-Lena Weiss

Personal details
- Born: 3 September 1949 (age 77) Hoffenheim, West Germany
- Party: Christian Democratic Union
- Spouse: Elisabeth Biechele (m. 1976)
- Relatives: Hermann Biechele (father-in-law)
- Education: University of Freiburg

Volker Kauder (born 3 September 1949) is a German lawyer and politician of the Christian Democratic Union (CDU). He served as parliamentary group leader of the ruling CDU/CSU faction in the German Bundestag from 2005 to 2018, during which he was frequently referred to as the "right hand" of Chancellor Angela Merkel.

== Political career ==
=== Career in state politics ===
Kauder was born in Hoffenheim. A student of the Hegau-Gymnasium in Singen, he became a member of Junge Union in the age of 17. In 1991, he became Secretary General of Baden-Württemberg CDU and subsequently served as the party's campaign manager for the state elections in 1992, 1996 and 2001. He served in this office until the resignation of party chairman Erwin Teufel in 2005.

=== Career in national politics ===
A trained lawyer, Kauder has been a member of the German Bundestag since the 1990 elections, representing the town of Rottweil in southwestern Germany (Rottweil – Tuttlingen). In parliament, he first served on the Committee on Labour and Social Affairs. Between 1998 and 2002, he led the Bundestag group of CDU parliamentarians from Baden-Württemberg. In this capacity, he publicly endorsed Edmund Stoiber as the joint CDU/CSU candidate for the 2002 national elections.

Kauder later served as First Parliamentary Secretary of the CDU/CSU parliamentary group from 2002 until 2005, under the leadership of the group's then-chairwoman Angela Merkel.

In early 2005, Merkel nominated Kauder as Secretary General of the CDU, after his predecessor Laurenz Meyer was forced to quit over payments he had received from his past employment with RWE, the power company. Ahead of the 2005 federal elections, he became Merkel's confidante and campaign coordinator while spearheading CDU proposals to increase VAT by 2 per cent to fund non-wage labour cost-cutting.

Following his party's victory in the elections, Kauder was elected chairman of the CDU/CSU parliamentary group in the Bundestag. He led the group with changing co-chairs from the CSU, Peter Ramsauer (2005–09), Hans-Peter Friedrich (2009–11), Gerda Hasselfeldt (2011-2018), and Alexander Dobrindt (2017-2018). Since 2005, he has served on the Committee on the Election of Judges (Wahlausschuss), which is in charge of appointing judges to the Federal Constitutional Court of Germany.

In the negotiations to form a coalition government following the 2013 federal elections, Kauder was part of the 15-member leadership circle chaired by Angela Merkel, Horst Seehofer and Sigmar Gabriel.

In a surprising vote among members of the CDU/CSU group in September 2018, Kauder was ousted after 13 years as chair. His deputy Ralph Brinkhaus received 125 votes to Kauder's 112 in a secret ballot.

In 2019, Kauder announced that he would not stand in the 2021 federal elections but instead resign from active politics by the end of the parliamentary term.

== Political positions ==
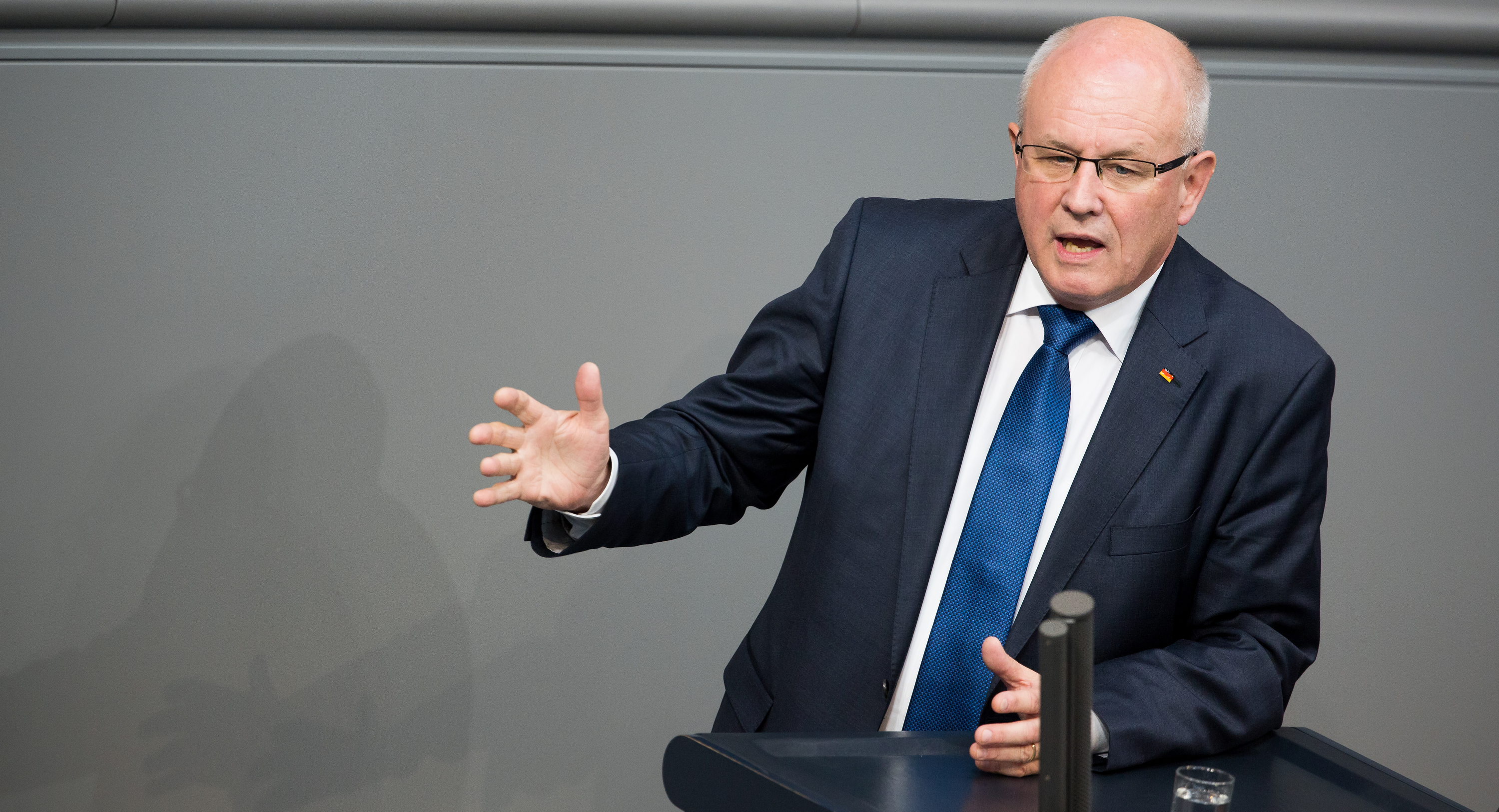
Volker Kauder in the German Bundestag, 2014

=== Social policy ===
Kauder is strictly against recognizing Islam as an equal religion within Germany. In an interview with news magazine Der Spiegel, he replied to the question if Islam is a part of Germany with: "No, Muslims are a part of Germany, Islam is not." In 2012, he told daily newspaper Passauer Neue Presse: "Islam is not part of our tradition and identity in Germany and so does not belong in Germany." He also appealed to Turkish-Islamic Union for Religious Affairs (DITIB), which represents more than 70 percent of Muslims living in Germany, to make clear to its members that Germany's constitution and law were above religion.

In response to increasing numbers of people leaving organized religion, Kauder also criticized the churches in Germany for not proselytizing enough. In 2011, he condemned Turkey's record on religious freedom and suggested that EU accession talks with Turkey should be suspended until the country supports the rights of Christians to ordain priests.

Kauder raised eyebrows in January 2005 when he compared draft anti-discrimination legislation to Nazi and Communist laws, arguing that the legislation would require people to hold the same political attitudes. In September 2013, Claudia Roth of the Green Party criticized Kauder for his voting against the criminal liability of rape within a marriage in 1997.

In an interview with the German newspaper Frankfurter Rundschau in December 2010, Kauder argued against the right of adoption for homosexual couples, his reasoning being that he doesn't "believe that children would like to get raised in a homosexual partnership." His position regarding this topic was explained by several German media outlets with his closeness to the evangelical organisation Deutsche Evangelische Allianz.

When the Federal Constitutional Court of Germany ruled the unequal treatment of registered civil partnerships and married couples regarding income splitting for spouses unconstitutional in May 2013, Kauder expressed that with his party, there will not be any equality of traditionally married couples and homosexual partnerships. In June 2017, he voted against Germany's introduction of same-sex marriage.

=== European integration ===
Kauder's criticism of British opposition to the introduction of a financial transaction tax, to curb speculative trading in financial markets, was seized upon by British media in 2011 as an indication of a dire confrontation between the two governments of Germany and the United Kingdom. He courted controversy the same year when he declared, in the context of ongoing European austerity measures, that, "Suddenly Europe is speaking German."

In 2012, Kauder criticized the European Central Bank's measures to buy the debt of troubled eurozone states that request a European bailout and fulfill strict domestic policy conditions, arguing that "the ECB has reached the border of what is permitted, also because it is moving into the area of state financing."

In discussions on whether there would be a renegotiation of France's 2015 deadline for bringing its deficit in line with the EU Stability and Growth Pact’s limit of 3 percent, Kauder said in a parliamentary debate that it was "high time that everyone understood that we must uphold the rules that we have adopted as law".

In August 2014, Kauder called for the EU to adopt common arms export regulations, saying there would be an increasing number of European defense companies in the future, "especially German-French ones."

=== Transatlantic relations ===
Reacting to revelations about NSA surveillance activities in Germany in 2013, Kauder blamed the United States for a "grave breach of trust" and demanded it should drop its "global power demeanor." However, he did not want a publicly accessible investigation into the claims of US surveillance of chancellor Merkel's mobile phone, insisting that only a secretly operating committee can effectively handle the issue.

In 2014, Kauder stated that the United States – through their military engagement in Iraq – “acquired a special responsibility for the country" and that "[i]t's the Americans' task to deal with security in Iraq."

Regarding the latest developments of the Euro crisis in Greece, Kauder stated in June 2015 that an essential condition for granting further financial aids for Greece would be that the IMF would be involved in the process as well, not only as a consultant but also financially.

=== Corruption ===
Kauder has voted no on legislative proposals against parliamentary corruption; he did so again in spring 2013.

=== Smoking ===
According to health politician Karl Lauterbach (SPD), Kauder was the driving force blocking a ban of smoking that Germany already in 2004 committed to the World Health Organization to introduce until 2010.

== Religious affiliation ==
Kauder is a confessing evangelical and has expressed his trust in the Bible. He also supports persecuted Christians in other countries.

== Other activities ==
- Jewish Museum Berlin, Alternate Member of the Board of Trustees
- Friends of the Deutsches Theater, Member of the Advisory Board
- Konrad Adenauer Foundation, Member of the Executive Board

== Recognition ==
- 2010 Medienpreis “Goldener Kompass”
- 2014 Order of St. Gregory the Great
- 2022 Knight Commander's Cross of the Order of Merit of the Federal Republic of Germany

== Controversy ==
In 2015, Kauder provoked fury among fellow conservatives by proposing that MPs from the CDU/CSU parliamentary group who dissent on Greek bailout votes should be punished, warning that lawmakers should not expect positions on important parliamentary committees if they broke ranks. He was vocal in his disapproval of the Greek Prime Minister Alexis Tsipras's rejection of offers throughout the negotiation process.

Party political offices
Preceded by Laurenz Meyer	Secretary General of the Christian Democratic Union of Germany; 2005	Succeeded by Ronald Pofalla
Preceded by Angela Merkel	Chairman of the CDU/CSU Parliamentary Group; 2005–2018	Succeeded by Ralph Brinkhaus
