= Wurmberg =

German municipality

- Municipality
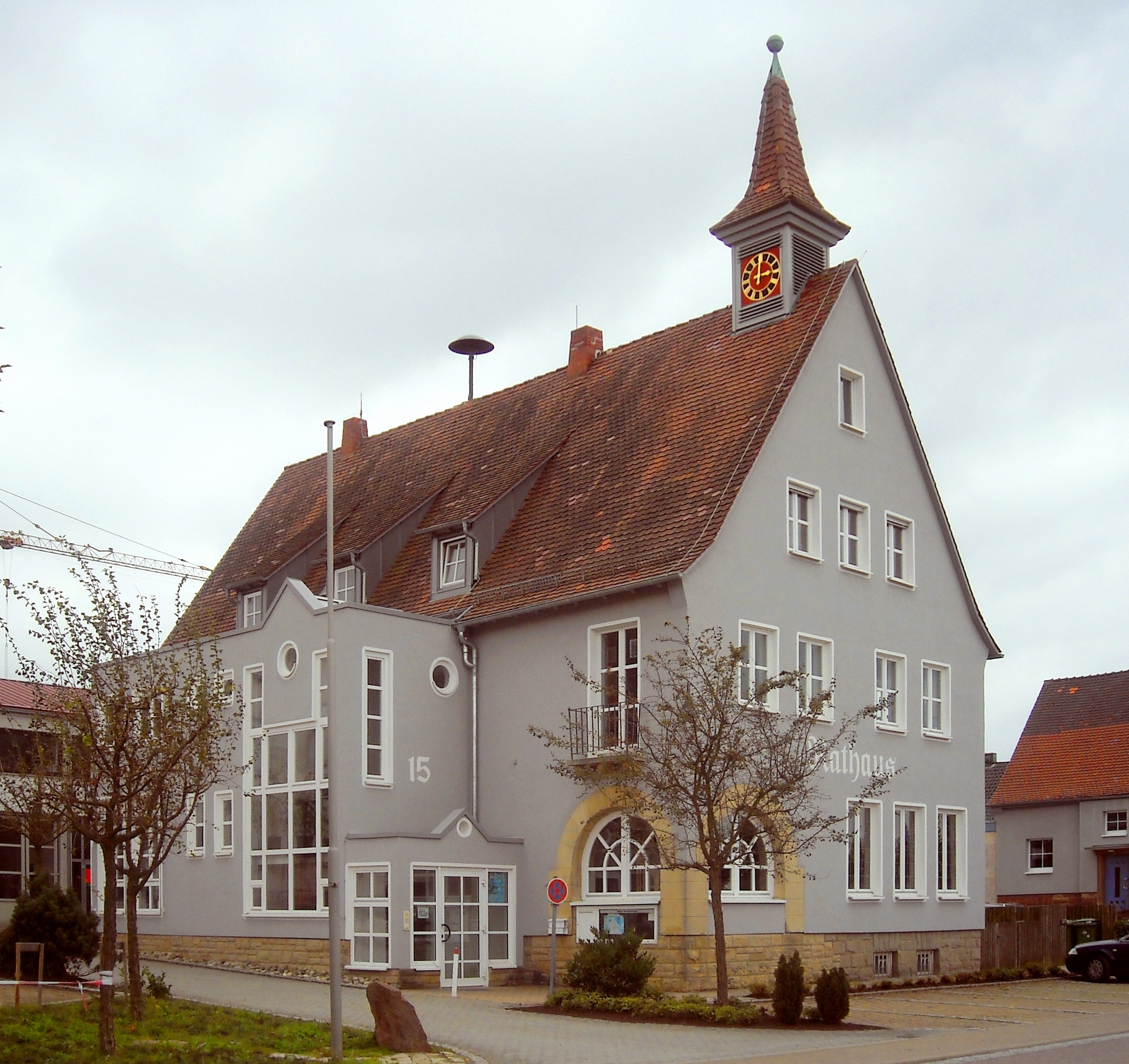
- Town hall

- Coat of arms

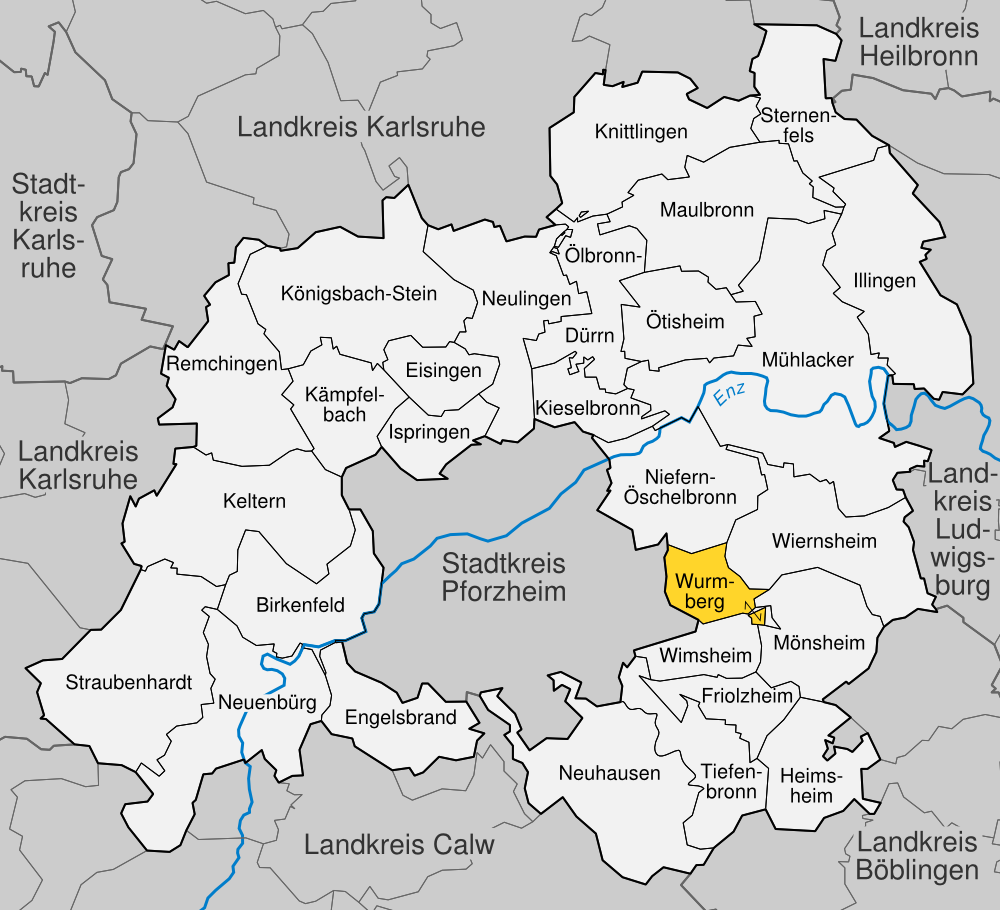
- Location of Wurmberg within Enzkreis district
- Interactive map of Wurmberg
- Location within Germany Location within Baden-Württemberg
- Coordinates: 48°52′16″N 8°49′6″E
- Country: Germany
- State: Baden-Württemberg
- Admin. region: Karlsruhe
- District: Enzkreis

Government
  - Mayor (2018–26): Jörg-Michael Teply

Area
  - Total: 7.36 km^{2} (2.84 sq mi)
- Elevation: 450 m (1,480 ft)

Population (2025-12-31)
  - Total: 3,300
  - Density: 450/km^{2} (1,200/sq mi)
- Time zone: UTC+01:00 (CET)
  - Summer (DST): UTC+02:00 (CEST)
- Postal codes: 75449
- Dialling codes: 07044
- Vehicle registration: PF
- Website: www.wurmberg.de

Wurmberg is a municipality in the district of Enz in Baden-Württemberg in Germany.

== Geography ==
Wurmberg is located on the so-called Platte, a Karst mountain range in the northern Black Forest (Schwarzwald).

== Municipality ==
The municipality Wurmberg includes the districts Wurmberg and Neubärental. Wurmberg was a settlement of the Waldensians from Lucerne.

== History ==
Wurmberg was first mentioned in documents in 1221 as a chapel was built at that time. In the following period, the Maulbronn Monastery secured the rule of Wurmberg. The monastery of Wurmberg came into Württemberg in 1504 following the Bavarian-Palatine War of Succession. At the end of the 17th Century Waldensian Protestants forced to flee from Italy settled in Wurmberg. The establishment of the district of Neubärental in 1721 goes back to these religious refugees. An originating theologian of Bärenthal (Hohenzollern) who had converted with some families from Catholicism to Protestantism, had to leave his home in the southern German town of Bärenthal.

== Religion ==
In 1534, Ulrich, Duke of Württemberg enforced the Protestant Reformation in his Duchy of Württemberg. Waldensians immigrants had found refuge in Wurmberg-Lucerne. 40 people form Bärenthal in Hohenzollern had found refuge in Wurmberg-Neubärental.

=== Population growth ===
The population figures for the respective area of jurisdiction are estimates, census results (¹) or official updates of the State Statistical Office Baden-Württemberg (only primary residences ).

Year	Population figures
1654	c. 79
December 1, 1871¹	1,126
December 1, 1880 ¹	1,181
December 1, 1890 ¹	1,258
December 1, 1900 ¹	1,229
December 1, 1910 ¹	1,213
June 16, 1925 ¹	1,176
June 16, 1933 ¹	1,193
May 17, 1939 ¹	1,146
1946
September 13, 1950 ¹	1,393
June 6, 1961 ¹	1,571
May 27, 1970 ¹	2,025
June 30, 1980	2,191
May 27, 1987 ¹	2,241
December 31, 1990	2,519
December 31, 1995	2,620
December 31, 2000	2,826
December 31, 2005	2,904
December 31, 2010	3,014

== Economy and infrastructure ==
The nearest railway station is Pforzheim main station, located about 10 km west of Wurmberg. Even closer to the breakpoint is Niefern on the route Pforzheim Mühlacker. Bus lines 739, 761, 763 and 769 of the Verkehrsverbund Pforzheim-Enzkreis connect Wurmberg with Pforzheim.

== Education ==
Wurmberg has its own primary school.
