= Rottweil – Tuttlingen =

Electoral constituency represented in the Bundestag

285 Rottweil – Tuttlingen
- Electoral district for the Bundestag
- Rottweil – Tuttlingen in 2025
- State: Baden-Württemberg
- Population: 280,600 (2019)
- Electorate: 198,182 (2021)
- Major settlements: Tuttlingen; Rottweil; Schramberg
- Area: 1,503.8 km^{2}

Current Electoral district
- Created: 1949
- Party: CDU
- Member: Maria-Lena Weiss
- Elected: 2021, 2025

Rottweil – Tuttlingen is an electoral constituency (German: Wahlkreis) represented in the Bundestag. It elects one member via first-past-the-post voting. Under the current constituency numbering system, it is designated as constituency 285. It is located in southwestern Baden-Württemberg, comprising the districts of Rottweil and Tuttlingen.

Rottweil – Tuttlingen was created for the inaugural 1949 federal election. Since 2021, it has been represented by Maria-Lena Weiss of the Christian Democratic Union (CDU).

== Geography ==
Rottweil – Tuttlingen is located in southwestern Baden-Württemberg. As of the 2021 federal election, it comprises the districts of Rottweil and Tuttlingen.

== History ==
Rottweil – Tuttlingen was created in 1949, then known as Rottweil. It acquired its current name in the 1987 election. In the 1949 election, it was Württemberg-Hohenzollern constituency 3 in the numbering system. In the 1953 through 1961 elections, it was number 192. In the 1965 through 1983 elections, it was number 196. In the 1987 through 1998 elections, it was number 189. In the 2002 and 2005 elections, it was number 286. Since the 2009 election, it has been number 285.

Originally, the constituency comprised the districts of Rottweil and Tuttlingen. In the 1965 through 1976 elections, it also contained the municipality of Wilflingen from the Hechingen district and the municipalities of Bärenthal and Beuron from the Sigmaringen district. Since the 1980 election, it has again comprised the Rottweil and Tuttlingen districts.

| Election | No. | Name | Borders |
|---|---|---|---|
| 1949 | 3 | Rottweil | Rottweil district; Tuttlingen district |
| 1953 | 192 | Rottweil | Rottweil district; Tuttlingen district |
| 1957 | 192 | Rottweil | Rottweil district; Tuttlingen district |
| 1961 | 192 | Rottweil | Rottweil district; Tuttlingen district |
| 1965 | 196 | Rottweil | Rottweil district; Tuttlingen district; Hechingen district (only Wilflingen municipality); Sigmaringen district (only Bärenthal and Beuron municipalities) |
| 1969 | 196 | Rottweil | Rottweil district; Tuttlingen district; Hechingen district (only Wilflingen municipality); Sigmaringen district (only Bärenthal and Beuron municipalities) |
| 1972 | 196 | Rottweil | Rottweil district; Tuttlingen district; Hechingen district (only Wilflingen municipality); Sigmaringen district (only Bärenthal and Beuron municipalities) |
| 1976 | 196 | Rottweil | Rottweil district; Tuttlingen district; Hechingen district (only Wilflingen municipality); Sigmaringen district (only Bärenthal and Beuron municipalities) |
| 1980 | 196 | Rottweil | Rottweil district; Tuttlingen district |
| 1983 | 196 | Rottweil | Rottweil district; Tuttlingen district |
| 1987 | 189 | Rottweil – Tuttlingen | Rottweil district; Tuttlingen district |
| 1990 | 189 | Rottweil – Tuttlingen | Rottweil district; Tuttlingen district |
| 1994 | 189 | Rottweil – Tuttlingen | Rottweil district; Tuttlingen district |
| 1998 | 189 | Rottweil – Tuttlingen | Rottweil district; Tuttlingen district |
| 2002 | 286 | Rottweil – Tuttlingen | Rottweil district; Tuttlingen district |
| 2005 | 286 | Rottweil – Tuttlingen | Rottweil district; Tuttlingen district |
| 2009 | 285 | Rottweil – Tuttlingen | Rottweil district; Tuttlingen district |
| 2013 | 285 | Rottweil – Tuttlingen | Rottweil district; Tuttlingen district |
| 2017 | 285 | Rottweil – Tuttlingen | Rottweil district; Tuttlingen district |
| 2021 | 285 | Rottweil – Tuttlingen | Rottweil district; Tuttlingen district |
| 2025 | 285 | Rottweil – Tuttlingen | Rottweil district; Tuttlingen district |

== Members ==
The constituency has been held continuously by Christian Democratic Union (CDU) since its creation. It was first represented by Karl Gengler from 1949 to 1957, followed by Bruno Heck from 1957 to 1976. Franz Sauter was representative from 1976 to 1990. Volker Kauder was representative from 1990 to 2021, a total of eight consecutive terms. He was succeeded by Maria-Lena Weiss in 2021.

| Election | Member | Party | % |
|---|---|---|---|
| 1949 | Karl Gengler | CDU | 50.5 |
| 1953 | Karl Gengler | CDU | 56.6 |
| 1957 | Bruno Heck | CDU | 55.6 |
| 1961 | Bruno Heck | CDU | 49.6 |
| 1965 | Bruno Heck | CDU | 55.9 |
| 1969 | Bruno Heck | CDU | 55.4 |
| 1972 | Bruno Heck | CDU | 57.8 |
| 1976 | Franz Sauter | CDU | 61.2 |
| 1980 | Franz Sauter | CDU | 57.6 |
| 1983 | Franz Sauter | CDU | 64.0 |
| 1987 | Franz Sauter | CDU | 56.5 |
| 1990 | Volker Kauder | CDU | 53.2 |
| 1994 | Volker Kauder | CDU | 53.7 |
| 1998 | Volker Kauder | CDU | 46.5 |
| 2002 | Volker Kauder | CDU | 52.6 |
| 2005 | Volker Kauder | CDU | 52.2 |
| 2009 | Volker Kauder | CDU | 48.1 |
| 2013 | Volker Kauder | CDU | 57.8 |
| 2017 | Volker Kauder | CDU | 43.0 |
| 2021 | Maria-Lena Weiss | CDU | 31.5 |
| 2025 | Maria-Lena Weiss | CDU | 38.9 |

== Election results ==
=== 2025 election ===
Federal election (2025): Rottweil – Tuttlingen
| Notes: | Blue background denotes the winner of the electorate vote. Pink background denotes a candidate elected from their party list. Yellow background denotes an electorate win by a list member, or other incumbent. A ✓ or ✗ denotes status of any incumbent, win or lose respectively. | | | | | | |
| Party | Candidate | Votes | % | ±% | Party votes | % | ±% |
|---|---|---|---|---|---|---|---|
| CDU | ✓ Maria-Lena Weiss | 62,241 | 38.9 | ▲7.5 | 55,063 | 34.4 | ▲6.7 |
| AfD | Joachim Bloch | 43,998 | 27.5 | ▲13.8 | 43,400 | 27.1 | ▲13.7 |
| SPD | Mirko Witkowski | 17,696 | 11.1 | ▼5.2 | 17,306 | 10.8 | ▼7.8 |
| Greens | Andreas Ragoschke-Schumm | 12,461 | 7.8 | ▼4.5 | 12,443 | 7.8 | ▼3.1 |
| FDP | Andreas Anton | 8,723 | 5.5 | ▼11.3 | 9,737 | 6.1 | ▼12.0 |
| Left | Anastacia Lausen | 7,144 | 4.5 | ▲2.3 | 7,540 | 4.7 | ▲2.5 |
| FW | Hermann Regele | 4,794 | 3.0 | ▲0.5 | 2,350 | 1.5 | ▼0.4 |
| Volt | Marius Dettki | 2,763 | 1.7 | | 1,264 | 0.8 | ▲0.5 |
| dieBasis | | 0 | 0 | ▼3.4 | 632 | 0.4 | ▼2.4 |
| Humanists | | 0 | 0 | ▼0.4 | 0 | 0 | ▼0.2 |
| ÖDP | | 0 | 0 | ▼1.0 | 522 | 0.3 | ▼0.2 |
| BSW | | | | | 7,248 | 4.5 | |
| Tierschutzpartei | | | | | 1,504 | 0.9 | ▼0.4 |
| PARTEI | | | | | 637 | 0.4 | ▼0.3 |
| Bündnis C | | | | | 356 | 0.2 | Steady |
| BD | | | | | 229 | 0.1 | |
| MLPD | | | | | 30 | 0.0 | Steady |
| Pirates | | | | | | | ▼0.4 |
| NPD | | | | | 221 | 0.1 | ▼0.2 |
| Gesundheitsforschung | | | | | | | ▼0.1 |
| Team Todenhöfer | | | | | | | ▼0.4 |
| Informal votes | | 1,586 | | | 1,145 | | |
| Total valid votes | | 159,820 | | | 160,261 | | |
| Turnout | | 161,406 | 82.3 | ▲6.7 | | | |
| CDU hold | Majority | 18,243 | 11.4 | ▲7.5 | | | |

=== 2021 election ===
Federal election (2021): Rottweil – Tuttlingen
| Notes: | Blue background denotes the winner of the electorate vote. Pink background denotes a candidate elected from their party list. Yellow background denotes an electorate win by a list member, or other incumbent. A ✓ or ✗ denotes status of any incumbent, win or lose respectively. | | | | | | |
| Party | Candidate | Votes | % | ±% | Party votes | % | ±% |
|---|---|---|---|---|---|---|---|
| CDU | Maria-Lena Weiss | 46,535 | 31.5 | ▼11.6 | 40,818 | 27.6 | ▼10.4 |
| FDP | Andreas Anton | 24,784 | 16.8 | ▲5.9 | 26,768 | 18.1 | ▲4.6 |
| SPD | Mirko Witkowski | 23,989 | 16.2 | ▲0.3 | 27,523 | 18.6 | ▲4.0 |
| AfD | Joachim Bloch | 20,293 | 13.7 | ▲0.7 | 19,747 | 13.4 | ▼0.6 |
| Greens | Annette Reif | 18,184 | 12.3 | ▲2.8 | 16,036 | 10.8 | ▲0.6 |
| dieBasis | Andreas Moritz | 5,058 | 3.4 | | 4,135 | 2.8 | |
| FW | Carmen Spiegelhalder-Schäfer | 3,733 | 2.5 | ▲1.3 | 2,726 | 1.8 | ▲0.9 |
| Left | Aynur Karlikli | 3,177 | 2.1 | ▼1.7 | 3,320 | 2.2 | ▼2.5 |
| Tierschutzpartei | | | | | 1,965 | 1.3 | ▲0.7 |
| PARTEI | | | | | 973 | 0.7 | ▲0.1 |
| ÖDP | Tobias Raffelt | 1,541 | 1.0 | ▼0.2 | 827 | 0.6 | ▼0.2 |
| Team Todenhöfer | | | | | 644 | 0.4 | |
| Volt | | | | | 371 | 0.3 | |
| Bündnis C | | | | | 299 | 0.2 | |
| Humanists | Mario Caraggiu | 544 | 0.4 | | 243 | 0.2 | |
| Pirates | | | | | 221 | 0.1 | ▼0.2 |
| NPD | | | | | 221 | 0.1 | ▼0.2 |
| Gesundheitsforschung | | | | | 216 | 0.1 | |
| Bürgerbewegung | | | | | 188 | 0.1 | |
| DiB | | | | | 106 | 0.1 | 0.0 |
| Bündnis 21 | | | | | 65 | 0.0 | |
| LKR | | | | | 37 | 0.0 | |
| DKP | | | | | 24 | 0.0 | 0.0 |
| MLPD | | | | | 12 | 0.0 | 0.0 |
| Informal votes | | 1,826 | | | 1,851 | | |
| Total valid votes | | 147,838 | | | 147,813 | | |
| Turnout | | 149,664 | 75.5 | ▼0.8 | | | |
| CDU hold | Majority | 21,751 | 14.7 | ▼12.4 | | | |

=== 2017 election ===
Federal election (2017): Rottweil – Tuttlingen
| Notes: | Blue background denotes the winner of the electorate vote. Pink background denotes a candidate elected from their party list. Yellow background denotes an electorate win by a list member, or other incumbent. A ✓ or ✗ denotes status of any incumbent, win or lose respectively. | | | | | | |
| Party | Candidate | Votes | % | ±% | Party votes | % | ±% |
|---|---|---|---|---|---|---|---|
| CDU | ✓ Volker Kauder | 64,558 | 43.0 | ▼14.8 | 57,060 | 38.0 | ▼13.7 |
| SPD | Georg Sattler | 23,855 | 15.9 | ▼1.9 | 21,900 | 14.6 | ▼2.9 |
| AfD | Reimond Hoffmann | 19,543 | 13.0 | ▲8.0 | 20,942 | 14.0 | ▲8.1 |
| FDP | Marcel Aulila | 16,255 | 10.8 | ▲7.5 | 20,328 | 13.5 | ▲7.2 |
| Greens | Hubert Nowack | 14,299 | 9.5 | ▲2.0 | 15,329 | 10.2 | ▲2.9 |
| Left | Laura Halding-Hoppenheit | 5,825 | 3.9 | ▲0.1 | 7,141 | 4.8 | ▲0.8 |
| Tierschutzallianz | Harald Becker | 2,012 | 1.3 | | 875 | 0.6 | |
| FW | Carmen Spiegelhalder-Schäfer | 1,869 | 1.2 | ▼0.2 | 1,418 | 0.9 | 0.0 |
| ÖDP | Verena Föttinger | 1,814 | 1.2 | ▼0.5 | 1,103 | 0.7 | ▼0.2 |
| Tierschutzpartei | | | | | 893 | 0.6 | ▼0.1 |
| PARTEI | | | | | 788 | 0.5 | |
| Pirates | | | | | 567 | 0.4 | ▼1.5 |
| NPD | | | | | 527 | 0.4 | ▼1.1 |
| DM | | | | | 337 | 0.2 | |
| BGE | | | | | 213 | 0.1 | |
| Menschliche Welt | | | | | 178 | 0.1 | |
| V-Partei³ | | | | | 168 | 0.1 | |
| DiB | | | | | 162 | 0.1 | |
| MLPD | | | | | 49 | 0.0 | 0.0 |
| DIE RECHTE | | | | | 44 | 0.0 | |
| DKP | | | | | 28 | 0.0 | |
| Informal votes | | 1,971 | | | 1,951 | | |
| Total valid votes | | 150,030 | | | 150,050 | | |
| Turnout | | 152,001 | 76.3 | ▲4.3 | | | |
| CDU hold | Majority | 40,703 | 27.1 | ▼12.9 | | | |

=== 2013 election ===
Federal election (2013): Rottweil – Tuttlingen
| Notes: | Blue background denotes the winner of the electorate vote. Pink background denotes a candidate elected from their party list. Yellow background denotes an electorate win by a list member, or other incumbent. A ✓ or ✗ denotes status of any incumbent, win or lose respectively. | | | | | | |
| Party | Candidate | Votes | % | ±% | Party votes | % | ±% |
|---|---|---|---|---|---|---|---|
| CDU | ✓ Volker Kauder | 81,517 | 57.8 | ▲9.8 | 72,998 | 51.7 | ▲13.0 |
| SPD | Ergun Can | 25,044 | 17.8 | ▲1.5 | 24,757 | 17.5 | ▲1.2 |
| Greens | Susanne Kieckbusch | 10,546 | 7.5 | ▼0.9 | 10,385 | 7.4 | ▼2.0 |
| AfD | Nikolaus Kinzler | 7,112 | 5.0 | | 8,214 | 5.8 | |
| Left | Edmond Jäger | 5,290 | 3.8 | ▼2.2 | 5,601 | 4.0 | ▼2.4 |
| FDP | Mechthild Wolber | 4,714 | 3.3 | ▼14.4 | 9,025 | 6.4 | ▼15.5 |
| Pirates | | | | | 2,582 | 1.8 | ▲0.1 |
| ÖDP | Bernhard Richter | 2,419 | 1.7 | ▲0.2 | 1,250 | 0.9 | ▼0.2 |
| NPD | Wolfram Fischer | 2,296 | 1.6 | ▼0.6 | 2,080 | 1.5 | ▼0.2 |
| FW | Hans-Gerd Hoffmann | 1,992 | 1.4 | | 1,383 | 1.0 | |
| Tierschutzpartei | | | | | 968 | 0.7 | ▼0.1 |
| RENTNER | | | | | 418 | 0.3 | |
| REP | | | | | 413 | 0.3 | ▼0.5 |
| PBC | | | | | 361 | 0.3 | ▼0.3 |
| Volksabstimmung | | | | | 353 | 0.3 | ▼0.1 |
| Party of Reason | | | | | 171 | 0.1 | |
| PRO | | | | | 99 | 0.1 | |
| BIG | | | | | 54 | 0.0 | |
| MLPD | | | | | 29 | 0.0 | 0.0 |
| BüSo | | | | | 27 | 0.0 | ▼0.1 |
| Informal votes | | 2,519 | | | 2,281 | | |
| Total valid votes | | 140,930 | | | 141,168 | | |
| Turnout | | 143,449 | 72.0 | ▲1.6 | | | |
| CDU hold | Majority | 56,473 | 40.0 | ▲9.6 | | | |

=== 2009 election ===
Federal election (2009): Rottweil – Tuttlingen
| Notes: | Blue background denotes the winner of the electorate vote. Pink background denotes a candidate elected from their party list. Yellow background denotes an electorate win by a list member, or other incumbent. A ✓ or ✗ denotes status of any incumbent, win or lose respectively. | | | | | | |
| Party | Candidate | Votes | % | ±% | Party votes | % | ±% |
|---|---|---|---|---|---|---|---|
| CDU | ✓ Volker Kauder | 66,104 | 48.0 | ▼4.2 | 53,547 | 38.7 | ▼6.1 |
| FDP | Ernst Burgbacher | 24,395 | 17.7 | ▲8.5 | 30,249 | 21.9 | ▲9.0 |
| SPD | Peter Fischer | 22,388 | 16.3 | ▼10.1 | 22,550 | 16.3 | ▼10.1 |
| Greens | Max Burger-Heidger | 11,503 | 8.4 | ▲2.3 | 12,924 | 9.3 | ▲2.3 |
| Left | Hans-Ulrich Bünger | 8,140 | 5.9 | | 8,753 | 6.3 | ▲3.2 |
| Pirates | | | | | 2,396 | 1.7 | |
| NPD | Michael Kerber | 3,006 | 2.2 | ▼0.3 | 2,298 | 1.7 | ▲0.1 |
| ÖDP | Bernhard Richter | 2,039 | 1.5 | | 1,498 | 1.1 | |
| REP | | | | | 1,126 | 0.8 | ▼0.3 |
| Tierschutzpartei | | | | | 1,022 | 0.7 | |
| PBC | | | | | 782 | 0.6 | ▼0.2 |
| Volksabstimmung | | | | | 502 | 0.4 | |
| DIE VIOLETTEN | | | | | 294 | 0.2 | |
| ADM | | | | | 140 | 0.1 | |
| DVU | | | | | 131 | 0.1 | |
| BüSo | | | | | 110 | 0.1 | 0.0 |
| MLPD | | | | | 45 | 0.0 | 0.0 |
| Informal votes | | 3,816 | | | 3,024 | | |
| Total valid votes | | 137,575 | | | 138,367 | | |
| Turnout | | 141,391 | 70.4 | ▼6.5 | | | |
| CDU hold | Majority | 41,709 | 30.3 | ▲4.5 | | | |

=== 2005 election ===
Federal election (2005):Rottweil – Tuttlingen
| Notes: | Blue background denotes the winner of the electorate vote. Pink background denotes a candidate elected from their party list. Yellow background denotes an electorate win by a list member, or other incumbent. A ✓ or ✗ denotes status of any incumbent, win or lose respectively. | | | | | | |
| Party | Candidate | Votes | % | ±% | Party votes | % | ±% |
|---|---|---|---|---|---|---|---|
| CDU | ✓ Volker Kauder | 78,062 | 52.2 | ▼0.4 | 67,326 | 44.8 | ▼5.8 |
| SPD | Peter Fischer | 39,405 | 26.4 | ▼5.3 | 39,596 | 26.4 | ▼2.9 |
| FDP | Ernst Burgbacher | 13,768 | 9.2 | ▼0.2 | 19,357 | 12.9 | ▲5.1 |
| Greens | Martin Lohrmann | 9,064 | 6.1 | ▲1.0 | 10,539 | 7.0 | ▼0.4 |
| Familie | Verena Föttinger | 5,473 | 3.7 | | 2,540 | 1.7 | |
| Left | | | | | 4,693 | 3.1 | ▲2.4 |
| NPD | Roland Kiesel | 3,681 | 2.5 | | 2,297 | 1.5 | ▲1.2 |
| REP | | | | | 1,655 | 1.1 | ▼0.1 |
| PBC | | | | | 1,113 | 0.7 | ▲0.2 |
| GRAUEN | | | | | 763 | 0.5 | ▲0.4 |
| BüSo | | | | | 161 | 0.1 | ▲0.1 |
| MLPD | | | | | 92 | 0.1 | |
| Informal votes | | 3,804 | | | 3,125 | | |
| Total valid votes | | 149,453 | | | 150,132 | | |
| Turnout | | 153,257 | 77.0 | ▼3.2 | | | |
| CDU hold | Majority | 38,657 | 25.8 | | | | |
