= Bruno Heck =

German politician (1917–1989)

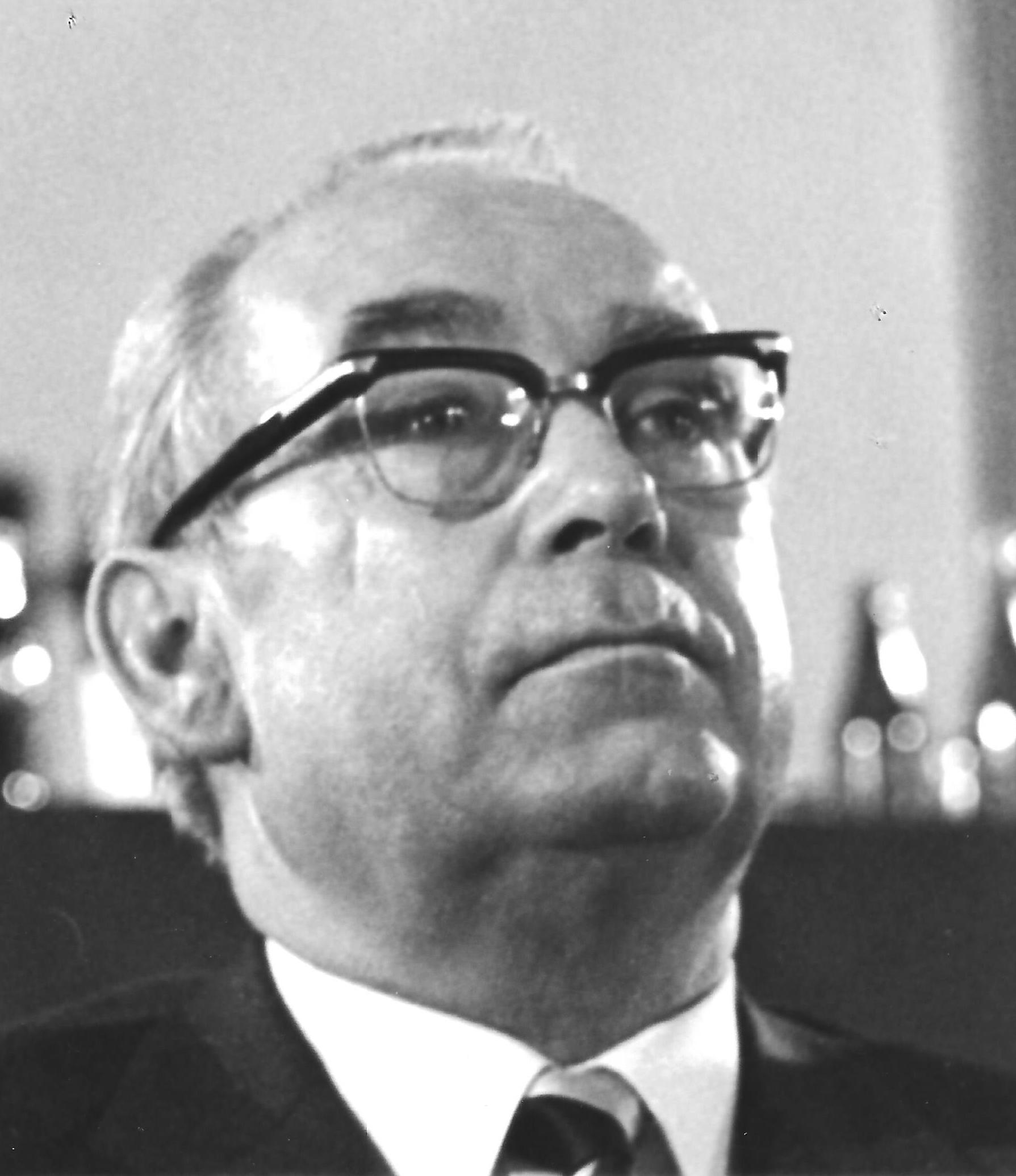
- Heck in 1971

Minister of Family Affairs and Youth
- In office 13 December 1962 – 1 October 1968
- Chancellor: Konrad Adenauer; Ludwig Erhard; Kurt Georg Kiesinger
- Preceded by: Franz-Josef Wuermeling
- Succeeded by: Aenne Brauksiepe

Minister of Housing and Urban Development
- In office 8 November 1966 – 1 December 1966
- Chancellor: Ludwig Erhard
- Preceded by: Ewald Bucher
- Succeeded by: Lauritz Lauritzen

Member of the Bundestag; for Rottweil
- In office 15 October 1957 – 14 December 1976
- Preceded by: Karl Gengler
- Succeeded by: Franz Sauter

Personal details
- Born: 20 January 1917 Aalen, Germany
- Died: 16 September 1989 (aged 72) Blaubeuren, West Germany
- Party: Christian Democratic Union
- Education: University of Tübingen

Bruno Heck (20 January 1917 – 16 September 1989) was a German politician of the Christian Democratic Union (CDU).

Heck was born into a poor Swabian Catholic family. He studied philosophy and theology at the University of Tübingen. From 1957 to 1976, Heck was a member of the German Bundestag.

Heck was Minister of Family Affairs and Youth from 1962 to 1968. After the resignation of the FDP ministers in 1966, he additionally headed the Ministry of Housing and Urban Development for a short time.

Heck headed the Konrad Adenauer Foundation from 1968 to 1989. The Bruno Heck Science Prize, awarded biannually by the Konrad Adenauer Foundation, was named in his honour.
