= Katrin Staffler =

German politician

Katrin Staffler MdB
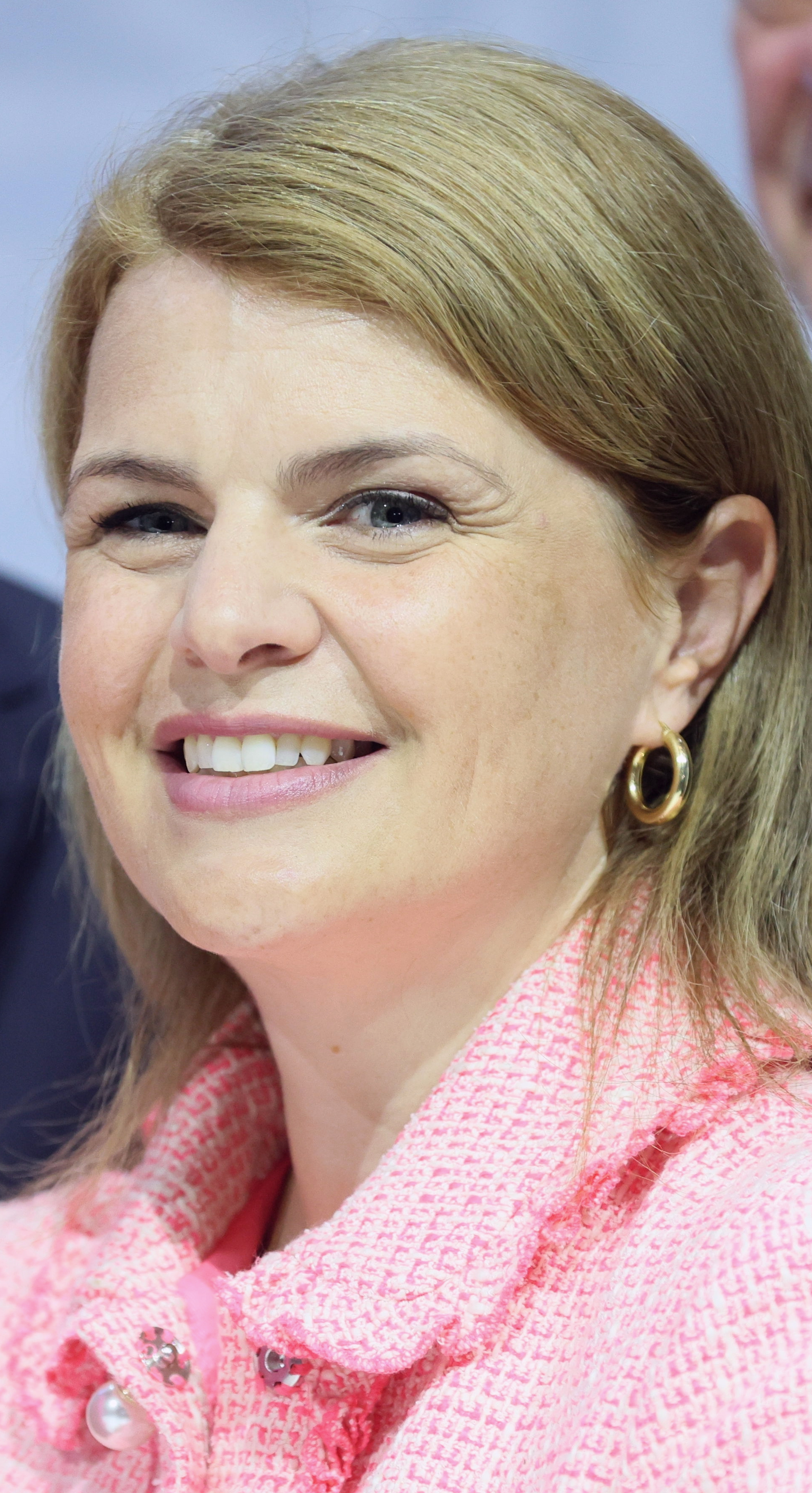
- Katrin Staffler in 2025

Member of the Bundestag; for Fürstenfeldbruck
- Incumbent
- Assumed office 24 October 2017
- Preceded by: Gerda Hasselfeldt

Personal details
- Born: Katrin Mair; 4 November 1981 (age 44) Dachau, West Germany
- Party: Christian Social Union
- Children: 1
- Education: TU Munich

Katrin Staffler (née Mair; born 4 November 1981) is a German politician of the Christian Social Union (CSU) who has been serving as a member of the Bundestag from the state of Bavaria since 2017, representing the constituency of Fürstenfeldbruck.

In addition to her parliamentary work, Staffler was nominated as Commissioner for Long-Term Care at the Federal Ministry of Health in the government of Chancellor Friedrich Merz in 2025.

== Early life and career ==
Staffler studied biochemistry at the Technical University of Munich from 2001 until 2006. After working at the university for several years, she became a spokesperson at HypoVereinsbank in 2015.

== Political career ==
Staffler became member of the Bundestag after the 2017 German federal election, representing Fürstenfeldbruck in Bavaria. She is a member of the Committee on Education, Research and Technology Assessment and the Committee on European Union Affairs. In this capacity, she serves as her parliamentary group's rapporteur on universities.

In addition to her committee assignments, Staffler is part of the German Parliamentary Friendship Group for Relations with Slovakia, the Czech Republic and Hungary. Since 2019, she has also been a member of the German delegation to the Franco-German Parliamentary Assembly.

== Other activities ==
- University of Hagen, Member of the Parliamentary Advisory Board (since 2022)
