= Maria-Lena Weiss =

German politician

Maria-Lena Weiss MdB

Member of the Bundestag; for Rottweil – Tuttlingen
- Incumbent
- Assumed office 26 October 2021
- Preceded by: Volker Kauder

Personal details
- Born: 4 April 1981 (age 45) Tuttlingen, West Germany
- Party: Christian Democratic Union
- Children: 3
- Education: University of Konstanz

Maria-Lena Weiss (born 4 April 1981) is a German politician for the CDU and since 2021 has been a member of the Bundestag, the federal diet.

== Life and politics ==
Weiss was born 1981 in the West German town of Tuttlingen and studied law at the University of Konstanz.

Weiss was elected directly to the Bundestag in 2021.
