= Gerda Hasselfeldt =

German politician (born 1950)

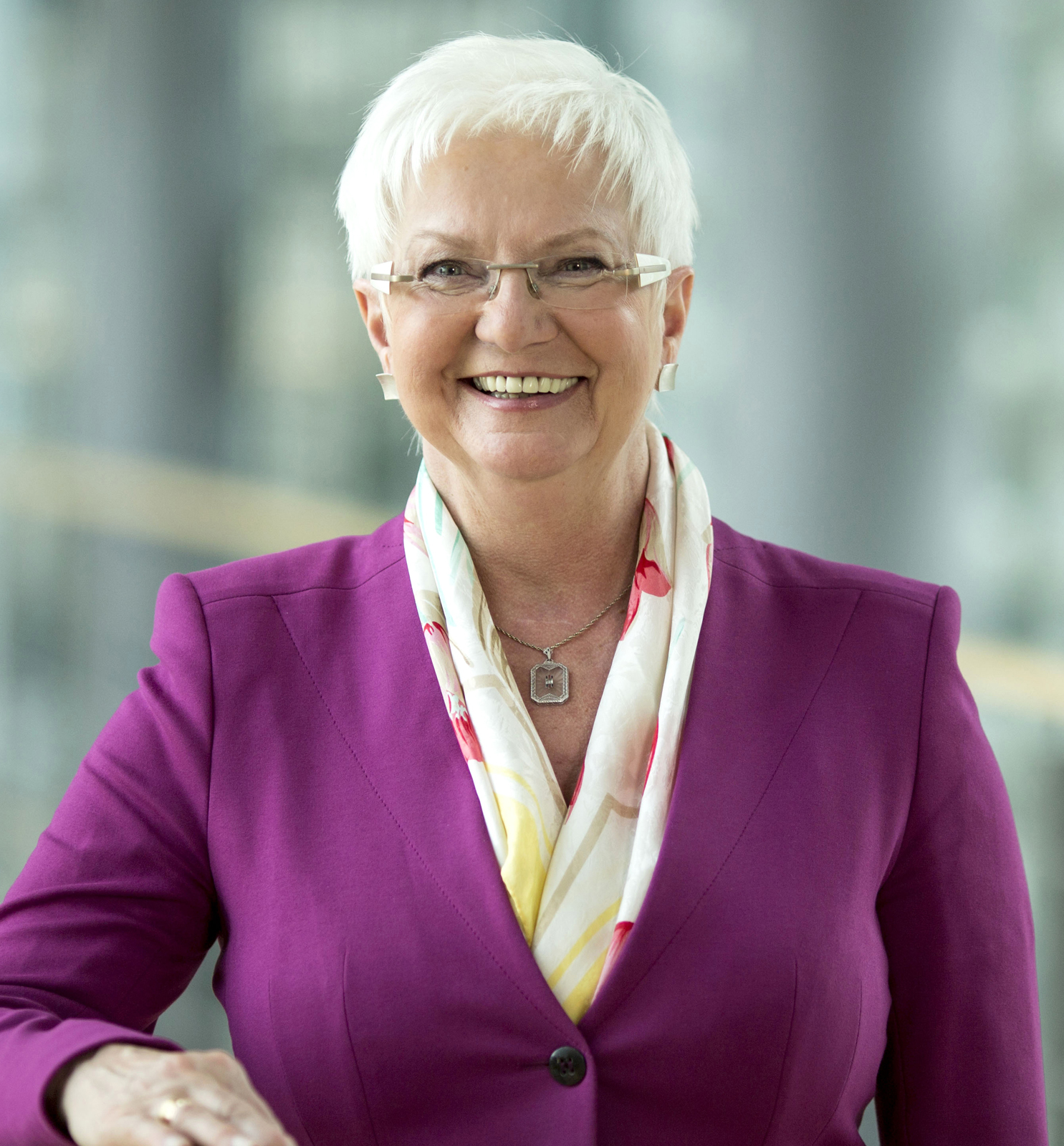

President of the German Red Cross
- In office 1 December 2017 – 29 November 2025
- Preceded by: Rudolf Seiters
- Succeeded by: Hermann Gröhe

First Deputy Leader of the CDU/CSU Group in the Bundestag
- In office 14 March 2011 – 24 October 2017
- Leader: Volker Kauder
- Preceded by: Hans-Peter Friedrich
- Succeeded by: Alexander Dobrindt

Vice President of the Bundestag
- In office 18 October 2005 – 14 March 2011
- President: Norbert Lammert
- Preceded by: Norbert Lammert
- Succeeded by: Eduard Oswald

Minister of Health
- In office 18 January 1991 – 5 May 1992
- Chancellor: Helmut Kohl
- Preceded by: Ursula Lehr
- Succeeded by: Horst Seehofer

Minister for Regional Planning, Building and Urban Development
- In office 21 April 1989 – 18 January 1991
- Chancellor: Helmut Kohl
- Preceded by: Oscar Schneider
- Succeeded by: Irmgard Schwaetzer

Member of the Bundestag; from Bavaria
- In office 24 March 1987 – 24 October 2017
- Preceded by: Franz Josef Strauss
- Succeeded by: Katrin Staffler
- Constituency: State list (1987–1990); Fürstenfeldbruck (1990–2017)

Personal details
- Born: 7 July 1950 (age 76) Straubing, West Germany
- Party: Christian Social Union
- Spouse: Wolfgang Zeitlmann (m. 2004; div. 2019)
- Children: 2
- Relatives: Alois Rainer (brother)
- Education: University of Regensburg; LMU Munich

Gerda Hasselfeldt (born 7 July 1950) is a German politician of the Christian Social Union (CSU) who served as deputy chairperson of the CDU/CSU parliamentary group and chairwoman of the Bundestag group of CSU parliamentarians.

Following her departure from active politics, Hasselfeldt served as President of the German Red Cross from 2018 to 2025.

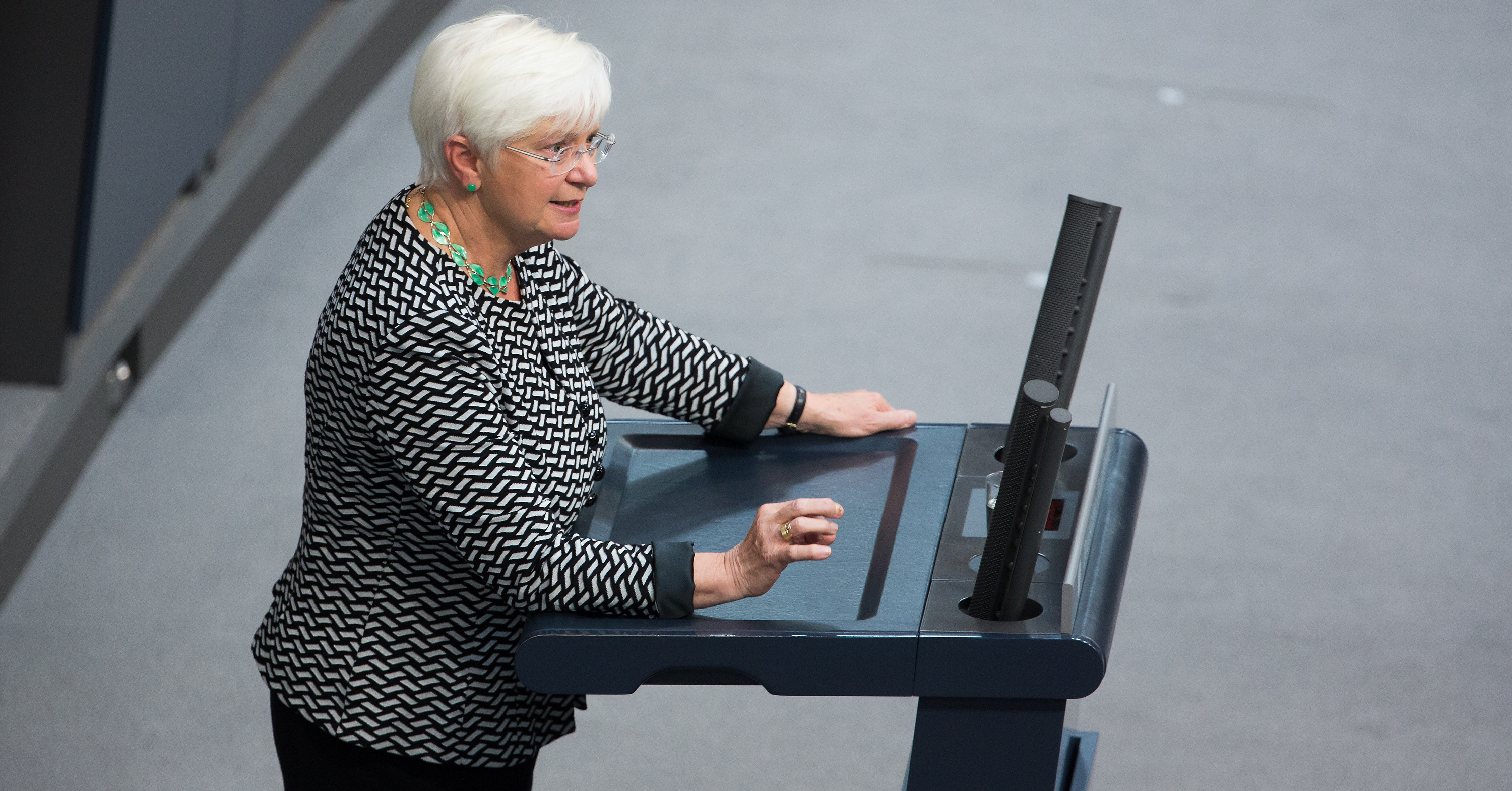
Gerda Hasselfeldt in the German Bundestag, 2014

== Political career ==
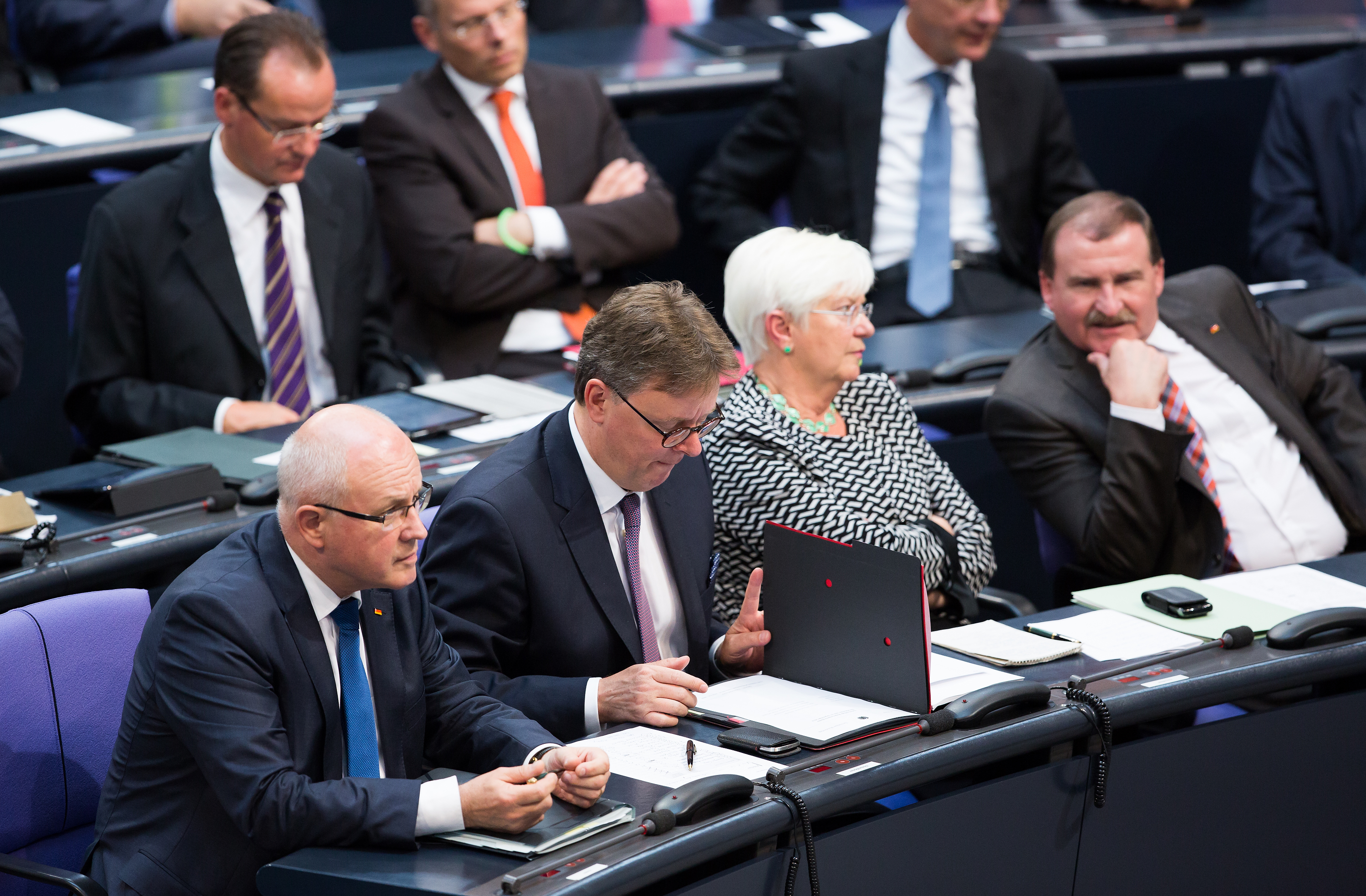
Gerda Hasselfeldt alongside Volker Kauder, Michael Grosse-Brömer and Max Straubinger at the Bundestag, 2014

An economist by training, Hasselfeldt first became a Member of the German Bundestag after the 1987 federal elections. She was appointed Federal Minister for Regional Planning, Building and Urban Development by then-Chancellor Helmut Kohl in a cabinet reshuffle two years later.

From 1991, Hasselfeldt served as Federal Minister for Health. She announced her resignation on 27 April 1992, saying the arrest of her close aide Reinhard Hoppe for allegedly spying for Poland had damaged her health. She was succeeded by Horst Seehofer.

Hasselfeldt was financial policy spokeswoman for the CDU/CSU parliamentary group for seven years. In 2002, she became the first deputy chairwoman of the parliamentary group, under the leadership of chairwoman Angela Merkel. During the 2005 election campaign, she took charge of agriculture, consumer protection and the environment in Merkel's nine-member shadow cabinet.

After the federal elections in 2005 and 2009, Hasselfeldt was elected Vice President of the German Bundestag. She held this office until she was elected to the head of the Bundestag group of CSU parliamentarians in 2011, succeeding Hans-Peter Friedrich. From 2011 until 2017, she led the group with her co-chair from the CDU, Volker Kauder.

In that capacity, Hasselfeldt was also a member of the parliament's Council of Elders, which – among other duties – determines daily legislative agenda items and assigning committee chairpersons based on party representation. Hasselfeldt also served on the Committee on the Election of Judges, which is in charge of appointing judges to the Federal Constitutional Court of Germany. From 2014, she was also a member of a parliamentary body in charge of appointing judges to the other Highest Courts of Justice, namely the Federal Court of Justice (BGH), the Federal Administrative Court (BVerwG), the Federal Fiscal Court (BFH), the Federal Labour Court (BAG), and the Federal Social Court (BSG).

In the negotiations to form a coalition government following the 2013 federal elections, Hasselfeldt was part of the 15-member leadership circle chaired by Angela Merkel, Horst Seehofer and Sigmar Gabriel.

In April 2016, Hasselfeldt announced that she would not stand in the 2017 federal elections and, instead, resign from active politics by the end of the parliamentary term.

== Life after politics ==
From 2018 until 2019, Hasselfeldt served on the German government's so-called coal commission, which is tasked to develop a masterplan before the end of the year on how to phase-out coal and create a new economic perspective for the country's coal-mining regions. In 2019, she was appointed by Federal Minister for Economic Cooperation and Development Gerd Müller as co-chair (alongside Bärbel Dieckmann) of a commission in charge of drafting recommendations on how to address the causes of displacement and migration.

== Political views ==
=== Social policy ===
When members of the Merkel's Christian Democrats in 2012 called on parliament to grant gay couples the same tax benefits as married heterosexuals, Hasselfeldt successfully railed against the idea. "Marriage between a man and a woman must be especially protected because it is fundamentally oriented towards the propagation of life —which isn't the case in homosexual relationships," said Hasselfeldt. In June 2017, she voted against Germany's introduction of same-sex marriage.

In a 2012 letter to Amazon.com CEO Jeff Bezos, Hasselfeldt asked the online retailer to suspend sales of a children's puzzle bearing the image of the crematorium at the Dachau concentration camp, calling the product 'a slap in the face' for Holocaust victims. Just 12 miles (19 km) from the Bavarian capital of Munich, Dachau lies within Hasselfeldt's constituency.

In 2014, Hasselfeldt publicly rejected complaints against her party over its slogan "those who commit fraud will be [kicked] out" - a claim that migrant workers could exploit social welfare.

=== European policies ===
A proponent of strict austerity policies during the Eurozone crisis, Hasselfeldt helped organize a majority of German lawmakers to approve a series of measures to assist Greece recover from its government debt crisis. In 2011, she demanded that Italy must do more to convince financial markets of its creditworthiness after a rating downgrade by Standard & Poor's. In 2013, she said Germany was watching France "with a degree of concern" and criticized French President François Hollande for not implementing spending cuts and structural reforms with "sufficient vigor." In a reaction to the European Commission's decision to give France two extra years to cut its deficit in early 2015, Hasselfeldt wrote to the body's president Jean-Claude Juncker in a letter to say that the timing of the decision – coinciding with the euro zone vehemently urging Greece to stick to rules set by the Eurogroup despite significant domestic resistance – "should not create the dangerous impression that we want to apply double standards," and that the same rules needed to apply to all countries whatever their size.

Criticizing Herman Van Rompuy's 2012 road map for a eurozone-wide fiscal policy, Hasselfeldt rejected proposals for a "eurozone fiscal capacity", arguing the idea looked to her like a "transfer union."

In the context of Turkey's largely failed attempted to ban microblogging service Twitter in 2014, Hasselfeldt reaffirmed that "[her] position has always been that Turkey should not be allowed into the EU, and that we are pursuing the principle of privileged partnership." In 2016, Hasselfeldt warned that Britain should not expect to have preferential treatment in case of a Brexit, saying "to me, it is clear: exit means exit. Citizens have to know that with this decision there will be no special treatment for Britain."

=== NSA surveillance and Edward Snowden ===
In 2014, Hasselfeldt blocked an opposition bid to bring Edward Snowden to Germany to testify, saying that inviting Snowden to Germany would harm relations with the U.S. and probably force the German government to extradite him to face U.S. espionage charges for unveiling National Security Agency data on surveillance.

== Awards ==
- 2023 Grand Cross of the Order of Merit of the Federal Republic of Germany

== Other activities ==
- German Foundation for Active Citizenship and Volunteering (DSEE), Member of the Board of Trustees (since 2020)
- Deutsches Museum, Member of the Board of Trustees
- Eugen Biser Foundation, Member of the Advisory Board
- Hanns Seidel Foundation, Member of the Board
- Jewish Museum, Berlin, Member of the Board of Trustees
- Federal Academy for Security Policy (BAKS), Member of the advisory board (2015–2018)
- Arnold Knoblauch Institute, chairwoman of the Board of Trustees (2002–2011)
- Federal Financial Supervisory Authority (BaFin), Member of the Administrative Council (1998–2011)
