= Bära =

River in Germany

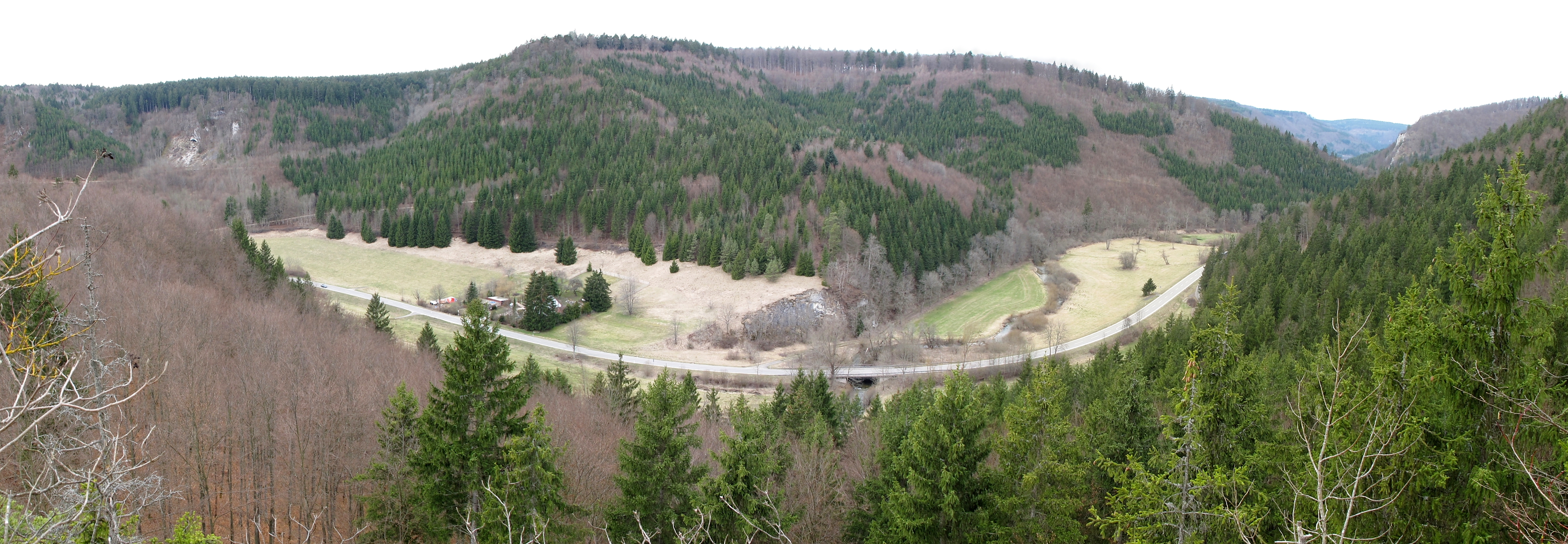
- View of the Bära looking northwest from the ruins of Castle Kreidenstein

Location
- Country: Germany
- State: Baden-Württemberg

Physical characteristics
- Source
  - location: Obere Bära in Tieringen; Untere Bära at Gosheim
  - elevation: 833 m (2,733 ft)
- Mouth
  - location: In Fridingen into the Danube
  - coordinates: 48.0289°N 8.9345°E
  - elevation: 623 m (2,044 ft)
- Length: 26.5 km (16.5 mi)

Basin features
- Progression: Danube→ Black Sea

The Bära is a river in Baden-Württemberg, Germany. The Bära is a tributary of the Danube, and originates at the confluence of the Obere Bära (Upper Bära) and the Untere Bära (Lower Bära). The 12.7 kilometres (7.9 mi) Bära, together with the Lower Bära, which is longer and has a larger drainage basin, has a combined length of 26.5 kilometres (16.5 mi).

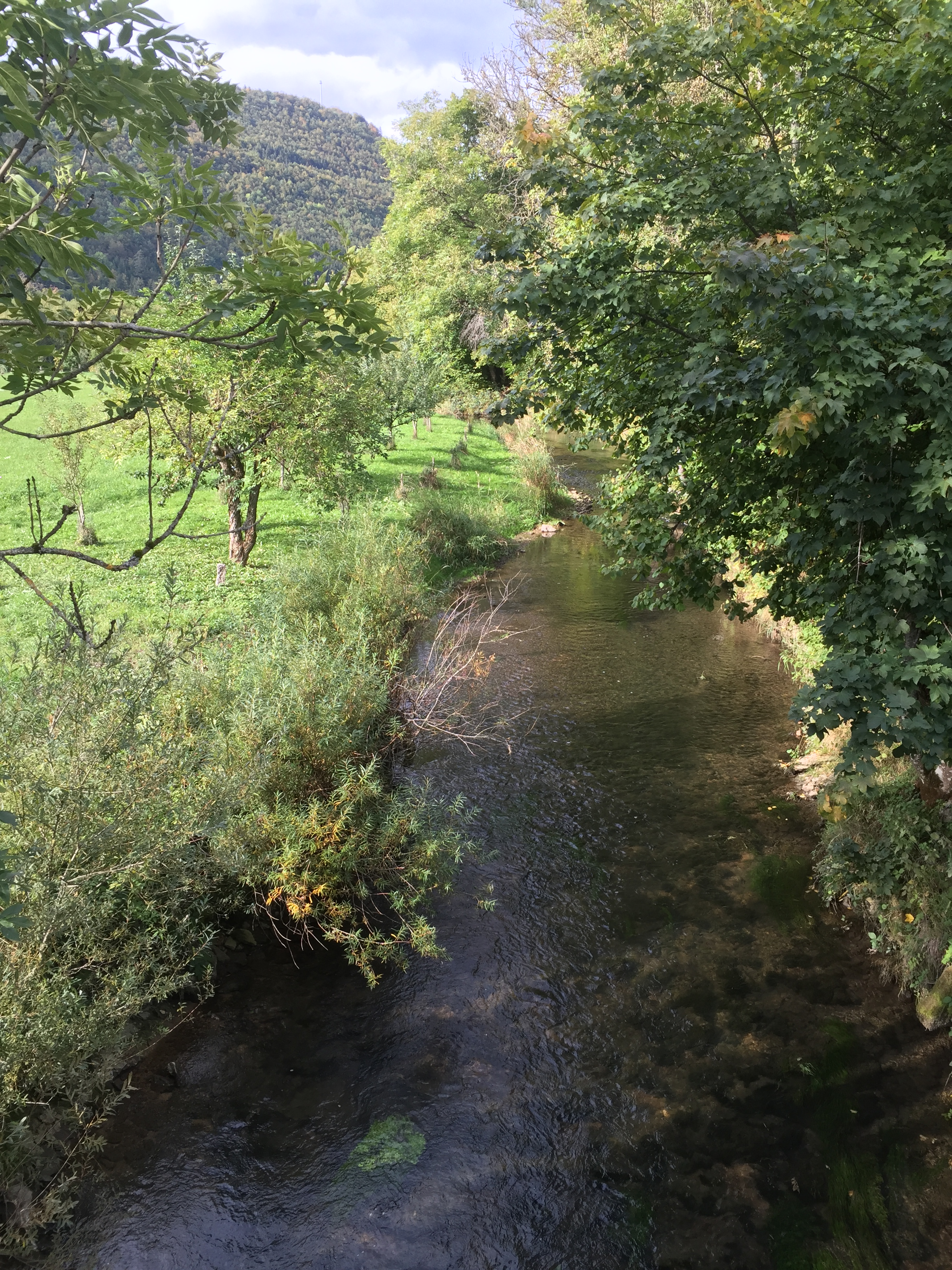
Bära, north of Bärenthal

Obere and Untere Bära join to form the Bära in the Galgenwiesen ("gallows meadow"), about four kilometers above the resort of Bärenthal. This runs moderately without significant inflow a further 12.7 kilometres (7.9 mi) south-southeast in Talschlingen, draining an additional area of 31.2 square kilometres (12.0 sq mi). Passing through Bärenthal at last it flows into Fridingen and there, near the town mill, it flows last of all in a southwesterly direction into the upper Danube, approximately at the entrance to the Fridingen Danube Bend.

== See also ==
- List of rivers of Baden-Württemberg
