= Fürstenfeldbruck (electoral district) =

Federal electoral district of Germany

214 Fürstenfeldbruck
- Electoral district for the Bundestag
- Fürstenfeldbruck in 2025
- State: Bavaria
- Population: 333,800 (2019)
- Electorate: 231,905 (2021)
- Major settlements: Dachau; Fürstenfeldbruck; Olching
- Area: 992.4 km^{2}

Current electoral district
- Created: 1949
- Party: CSU
- Member: Katrin Staffler
- Elected: 2017, 2021

Fürstenfeldbruck is an electoral constituency (German: Wahlkreis) represented in the Bundestag. It elects one member via first-past-the-post voting. Under the current constituency numbering system, it is designated as constituency 214. It is located in southern Bavaria, comprising the districts of Dachau and Fürstenfeldbruck.

Fürstenfeldbruck was created for the inaugural 1949 federal election. Since 2017, it has been represented by Katrin Staffler of the Christian Social Union (CSU).

== Geography ==
Fürstenfeldbruck is located in southern Bavaria. As of the 2021 federal election, it comprises the district of Dachau and the entirety of the Fürstenfeldbruck district excluding the municipality of Germering.

== History ==
Fürstenfeldbruck was created in 1949. In the 1949 election, it was Bavaria constituency 2 in the numbering system. In the 1953 through 1961 elections, it was number 197. In the 1965 through 1972 elections, it was number 201. In the 1976 election, it was number 202. In the 1980 through 1998 elections, it was number 201. In the 2002 and 2005 elections, it was number 217. In the 2009 and 2013 elections, it was number 216. In the 2017 and 2021 elections, it was number 215. From the 2025 election, it has been number 214.

Originally, the constituency comprised the independent city of Landsberg am Lech and the districts of Fürstenfeldbruck, Dachau, and Landkreis Landsberg am Lech. In the 1976 election, it comprised the districts of Fürstenfeldbruck, Dachau, and Landsberg. In the 1980 through 2009 elections, it comprised the districts of Fürstenfeldbruck and Dachau. In the 2013 election, it lost the municipality of Petershausen from the Dachau district. In the 2017 election, it regained Petershausen while losing Germering from the Fürstenfeldbruck district.

Election	No.	Name	Borders
1949	2	Fürstenfeldbruck	Landsberg am Lech city; Fürstenfeldbruck district; Dachau district; Landkreis Landsberg am Lech district
1953	197	Fürstenfeldbruck	Landsberg am Lech city; Fürstenfeldbruck district; Dachau district; Landkreis Landsberg am Lech district
1957	197	Fürstenfeldbruck	Landsberg am Lech city; Fürstenfeldbruck district; Dachau district; Landkreis Landsberg am Lech district
1961	197	Fürstenfeldbruck	Landsberg am Lech city; Fürstenfeldbruck district; Dachau district; Landkreis Landsberg am Lech district
1965	201	Fürstenfeldbruck	Landsberg am Lech city; Fürstenfeldbruck district; Dachau district; Landkreis Landsberg am Lech district
1969	201	Fürstenfeldbruck	Landsberg am Lech city; Fürstenfeldbruck district; Dachau district; Landkreis Landsberg am Lech district
1972	201	Fürstenfeldbruck	Landsberg am Lech city; Fürstenfeldbruck district; Dachau district; Landkreis Landsberg am Lech district
1976	202	Fürstenfeldbruck	Fürstenfeldbruck district; Dachau district; Landsberg district
1980	201	Fürstenfeldbruck	Fürstenfeldbruck district; Dachau district
1983	201	Fürstenfeldbruck	Fürstenfeldbruck district; Dachau district
1987	201	Fürstenfeldbruck	Fürstenfeldbruck district; Dachau district
1990	201	Fürstenfeldbruck	Fürstenfeldbruck district; Dachau district
1994	201	Fürstenfeldbruck	Fürstenfeldbruck district; Dachau district
1998	201	Fürstenfeldbruck	Fürstenfeldbruck district; Dachau district
2002	217	Fürstenfeldbruck	Fürstenfeldbruck district; Dachau district
2005	217	Fürstenfeldbruck	Fürstenfeldbruck district; Dachau district
2009	216	Fürstenfeldbruck	Fürstenfeldbruck district; Dachau district
2013	216	Fürstenfeldbruck	Fürstenfeldbruck district; Dachau district (excluding Petershausen municipality)
2017	215	Fürstenfeldbruck	Fürstenfeldbruck district (excluding Germering municipality); Dachau district
2021	215	Fürstenfeldbruck	Fürstenfeldbruck district (excluding Germering municipality); Dachau district
2025	214	Fürstenfeldbruck	Fürstenfeldbruck district (excluding Germering municipality); Dachau district

== Members ==
The constituency has been held continuously by the Christian Social Union (CSU) since its creation. It was first represented by Richard Jaeger from 1949 to 1980, a total of eight consecutive terms. He was succeeded by Eicke Götz from 1980 to 1990. Gerda Hasselfeldt was then representative from 1990 to 2017, a total of seven consecutive terms. Katrin Staffler was elected in 2017 and re-elected in 2021.

Election	Member	Party	%
1949	Richard Jaeger	CSU	27.1
1953	Richard Jaeger	CSU	51.1
1957	Richard Jaeger	CSU	54.5
1961	Richard Jaeger	CSU	56.2
1965	Richard Jaeger	CSU	57.9
1969	Richard Jaeger	CSU	51.1
1972	Richard Jaeger	CSU	53.8
1976	Richard Jaeger	CSU	60.2
1980	Eicke Götz	CSU	56.1
1983	Eicke Götz	CSU	61.5
1987	Eicke Götz	CSU	58.4
1990	Gerda Hasselfeldt	CSU	53.2
1994	Gerda Hasselfeldt	CSU	55.6
1998	Gerda Hasselfeldt	CSU	52.6
2002	Gerda Hasselfeldt	CSU	59.4
2005	Gerda Hasselfeldt	CSU	55.5
2009	Gerda Hasselfeldt	CSU	48.9
2013	Gerda Hasselfeldt	CSU	55.6
2017	Katrin Staffler	CSU	43.6
2021	Katrin Staffler	CSU	38.0

== Election results ==
=== 2025 election ===
Federal election (2025): Fürstenfeldbruck
Notes:	Blue background denotes the winner of the electorate vote. Pink background denotes a candidate elected from their party list. Yellow background denotes an electorate win by a list member, or other incumbent. A ✓ or ✗ denotes status of any incumbent, win or lose respectively.						
Party	Candidate	Votes	%	±%	Party votes	%	±%
CSU	✓ Katrin Staffler	84,648	42.6	▲4.6	78.928	39.7	▲6.4
SPD	Michael Schrodi	29.795	15.0	▼4.3	23.134	11.6	▼4.6
AfD	Braun, Jürgen	27.997	14.1	▲7.3	29.818	15.0	▲8.1
Greens	Britta Jacob	23,886	12.0	▼1.2	27,778	14.0	▼2.0
FW	Dagmar Wagner	8.829	4.4	▼2.4	6,926	3.5	▼2.9
FDP	Susanne Seehofer	8,748	4.4	▼4.0	10,015	5.0	▼7.0
Left	Alexander Bayas	7,312	3.7	▲2.0	10,605	5.3	▲3.1
Tierschutzpartei	Susanne Baur	2,870	1.4		1,634	0.8	▼0.4
Volt	Thomas Matern	2.541	1.3	▲0.5	1,703	0.9	▲0.4
ÖDP	Wolf Home	1.971	1.0	▼0.1	924	0.5	▼0.2
dieBasis					654	0.3	▼1.8
PARTEI					785	0.4	▼0.3
BSW					5,339	2.7	
Humanists					151	0.1	0.0
BD					150	0.1	
Marxist-Leninist Party of Germany					25	0.0	0.0
Gesundheitsforschung							▼0.1
Unabhängige							▼0.4
Team Todenhöfer							▼0.3
Pirates							▼0.4
Bündnis C							▼0.0
Informal votes		822			523		
Total valid votes		198,597			198,896		
Turnout		199.419	86.6	▲3.5			
CSU hold	Majority			▲4.6			

=== 2021 election ===
Federal election (2021): Fürstenfeldbruck
Notes:	Blue background denotes the winner of the electorate vote. Pink background denotes a candidate elected from their party list. Yellow background denotes an electorate win by a list member, or other incumbent. A ✓ or ✗ denotes status of any incumbent, win or lose respectively.						
Party	Candidate	Votes	%	±%	Party votes	%	±%
CSU	✓ Katrin Staffler	72,721	38.0	▼5.6	63,944	33.3	▼6.5
SPD	Michael Schrodi	36,831	19.3	▲0.5	31,141	16.2	▲2.6
Greens	Beate Walter-Rosenheimer	25,363	13.3	▲4.2	30,537	15.9	▲4.9
FDP	Ulrich Bode	16,029	8.4	▲1.2	23,046	12.0	▲0.4
FW	Susanne Droth	13,085	6.8	▲3.7	12,325	6.4	▲4.0
AfD	Florian Jäger	13,056	6.8	▼3.4	13,209	6.9	▼4.7
dieBasis	Christian Kreiß	5,075	2.7		4,102	2.1	
Left	Ernestine Martin-Köppl	3,216	1.7	▼2.4	4,192	2.2	▼2.9
Tierschutzpartei					2,388	1.2	▲0.3
PARTEI	Fabian Handfest	2,384	1.2		1,274	0.7	0.0
ÖDP	Stephanie Sichelschmidt	2,122	1.1	▼0.5	1,359	0.7	▼0.2
Volt	Daniel Burandt	1,408	0.7		863	0.4	
BP					795	0.4	▼0.6
Pirates					683	0.4	0.0
Team Todenhöfer					631	0.3	
Unabhängige					323	0.2	
Gesundheitsforschung					230	0.1	0.0
V-Partei3					203	0.1	▼0.1
Humanists					178	0.1	
du.					103	0.1	
NPD					91	0.0	▼0.1
Bündnis C					90	0.0	
The III. Path					72	0.0	
LKR					44	0.0	
MLPD					16	0.0	0.0
DKP					13	0.0	0.0
Informal votes		1,489			927		
Total valid votes		191,290			191,852		
Turnout		192,779	83.1	▲0.9			
CSU hold	Majority	35,890	18.7	▼6.1			

=== 2017 election ===
Federal election (2017): Fürstenfeldbruck
Notes:	Blue background denotes the winner of the electorate vote. Pink background denotes a candidate elected from their party list. Yellow background denotes an electorate win by a list member, or other incumbent. A ✓ or ✗ denotes status of any incumbent, win or lose respectively.						
Party	Candidate	Votes	%	±%	Party votes	%	±%
CSU	Katrin Staffler	82,602	43.6	▼12.3	75,621	39.8	▼11.1
SPD	Michael Schrodi	35,454	18.7	▼1.1	25,929	13.7	▼4.5
AfD	Florian Jäger	19,352	10.2	▲5.6	21,934	11.6	▲6.3
Greens	Beate Walter-Rosenheimer	17,244	9.1	▲1.6	20,886	11.0	▲2.2
FDP	Andreas Schwarzer	13,661	7.2	▲5.0	22,005	11.6	▲6.7
Left	Renate Schiefer	7,699	4.1	▲1.4	9,633	5.1	▲2.1
FW	Lilian Edenhofer	5,882	3.1	▼0.2	4,545	2.4	▼0.4
BP	Sebastian Kellerer	3,080	1.6		1,946	1.0	▼0.1
ÖDP	Jürgen Loos	3,018	1.6	0.0	1,790	0.9	▼0.2
Tierschutzpartei					1,773	0.9	▲0.2
PARTEI					1,270	0.7	
Independent	Christian Kreiß	793	0.4				
Pirates					636	0.3	▼1.6
Independent	Hansjörg Tschan	515	0.3				
DiB					343	0.2	
V-Partei³					327	0.2	
DM					322	0.2	
NPD					295	0.2	▼0.3
BGE					279	0.1	
Gesundheitsforschung					219	0.1	
MLPD					44	0.0	0.0
DKP					28	0.0	
BüSo					22	0.0	0.0
Informal votes		1,469			922		
Total valid votes		189,300			189,847		
Turnout		190,769	82.2	▲7.0			
CSU hold	Majority	47,148	24.9	▼10.6			

=== 2013 election ===
Federal election (2013): Fürstenfeldbruck
Notes:	Blue background denotes the winner of the electorate vote. Pink background denotes a candidate elected from their party list. Yellow background denotes an electorate win by a list member, or other incumbent. A ✓ or ✗ denotes status of any incumbent, win or lose respectively.						
Party	Candidate	Votes	%	±%	Party votes	%	±%
CSU	✓ Gerda Hasselfeldt	103,904	55.6	▲6.6	94,458	50.4	▲7.7
SPD	Michael Schrodi	37,575	20.1	▲1.1	34,660	18.5	▲2.8
Greens	Beate Walter-Rosenheimer	14,515	7.8	▼3.0	16,586	8.9	▼3.6
AfD	Florian Jäger	8,672	4.6		9,807	5.2	
FW	Bernd Heilmeier	6,009	3.2		5,051	2.7	
Left	Irina Graf	5,096	2.7	▼1.1	5,711	3.0	▼1.7
Pirates	Ralf Reinhardt	4,259	2.3		3,599	1.9	0.0
FDP	Andreas Schwarzer	4,196	2.2	▼8.9	9,455	5.0	▼11.1
BP					2,086	1.1	0.0
ÖDP		2,814	1.5	▼0.2	2,056	1.1	▲0.1
Tierschutzpartei					1,401	0.7	0.0
NPD					901	0.5	▼0.3
REP					540	0.3	▼0.2
DIE FRAUEN					275	0.1	
DIE VIOLETTEN					240	0.1	▼0.1
PRO					161	0.1	
Party of Reason					141	0.1	
RRP					62	0.0	▼1.2
MLPD					40	0.0	0.0
BüSo					23	0.0	0.0
Informal votes		1,377			1,164		
Total valid votes		187,040			187,253		
Turnout		188,417	75.0	▼1.3			
CSU hold	Majority	66,329	35.5	▲5.7			

=== 2009 election ===
Federal election (2009): Fürstenfeldbruck
Notes:	Blue background denotes the winner of the electorate vote. Pink background denotes a candidate elected from their party list. Yellow background denotes an electorate win by a list member, or other incumbent. A ✓ or ✗ denotes status of any incumbent, win or lose respectively.						
Party	Candidate	Votes	%	±%	Party votes	%	±%
CSU	✓ Gerda Hasselfeldt	91,947	48.9	▼6.6	80,517	42.7	▼7.1
SPD	Peter Falk	35,851	19.1	▼7.6	29,734	15.8	▼7.5
FDP	Daniela Seidl	20,997	11.2	▲4.9	30,319	16.1	▲5.2
Greens	Beate Walter-Rosenheimer (Note: Walter-Rosenheimer entered the Bundestag on the Greens list after the resignation of Christine Scheel in January 2012.)	20,344	10.8	▲2.8	23,583	12.5	▲2.4
Left	Fridolin Brandt	7,311	3.9	▲1.5	8,969	4.8	▲2.0
Pirates					3,649	1.9	
ÖDP	Adrian Heim	3,197	1.7		1,902	1.0	
BP	Konrad Wirtz	3,172	1.7		2,027	1.1	▲0.6
RRP	Hans Lampl	2,462	1.3		2,230	1.2	
NPD	Roland Wuttke	2,053	1.1	▼0.2	1,536	0.8	0.0
Tierschutzpartei					1,350	0.7	
FAMILIE					1,086	0.6	0.0
REP					895	0.5	▼0.1
Independent	Reimund Acker	793	0.4				
DIE VIOLETTEN					417	0.2	
PBC					157	0.1	0.0
CM					141	0.1	
DVU					105	0.1	
BüSo					74	0.0	0.0
MLPD					37	0.0	0.0
Informal votes		2,171			1,570		
Total valid votes		188,127			188,728		
Turnout		190,298	76.4	▼5.6			
CSU hold	Majority	56,096	29.8	▲1.0			

=== 2005 election ===
Federal election (2005):Fürstenfeldbruck
Notes:	Blue background denotes the winner of the electorate vote. Pink background denotes a candidate elected from their party list. Yellow background denotes an electorate win by a list member, or other incumbent. A ✓ or ✗ denotes status of any incumbent, win or lose respectively.						
Party	Candidate	Votes	%	±%	Party votes	%	±%
CSU	✓ Gerda Hasselfeldt	108,897	55.5	▼3.9	98,089	49.7	▼8.3
SPD	Peter Falk	52,329	26.7	▼0.6	45,927	23.3	▼0.6
Greens	Markus Rainer	15,698	8.0	▲0.9	19,959	10.1	0.0
FDP	Annette Bulfon	12,199	6.2	▲2.0	21,471	10.9	▲5.8
Left	Wolf-Dieter Krämer	4,764	2.4	▲1.5	5,430	2.8	▲2.1
NPD	Manfred Saur	2,466	1.3		1,591	0.8	▲0.7
REP					1,205	0.6	0.0
Familie					1,122	0.6	
BP					969	0.5	▲0.4
GRAUEN					678	0.3	▲0.2
Feminist					407	0.2	▲0.1
PBC					244	0.1	0.0
BüSo					104	0.1	0.0
MLPD					66	0.0	
Informal votes		2,785			1,876		
Total valid votes		196,353			197,262		
Turnout		199,138	82.0	▼2.6			
CSU hold	Majority	56,568	28.8				
