= Obere Bära =

River in Germany

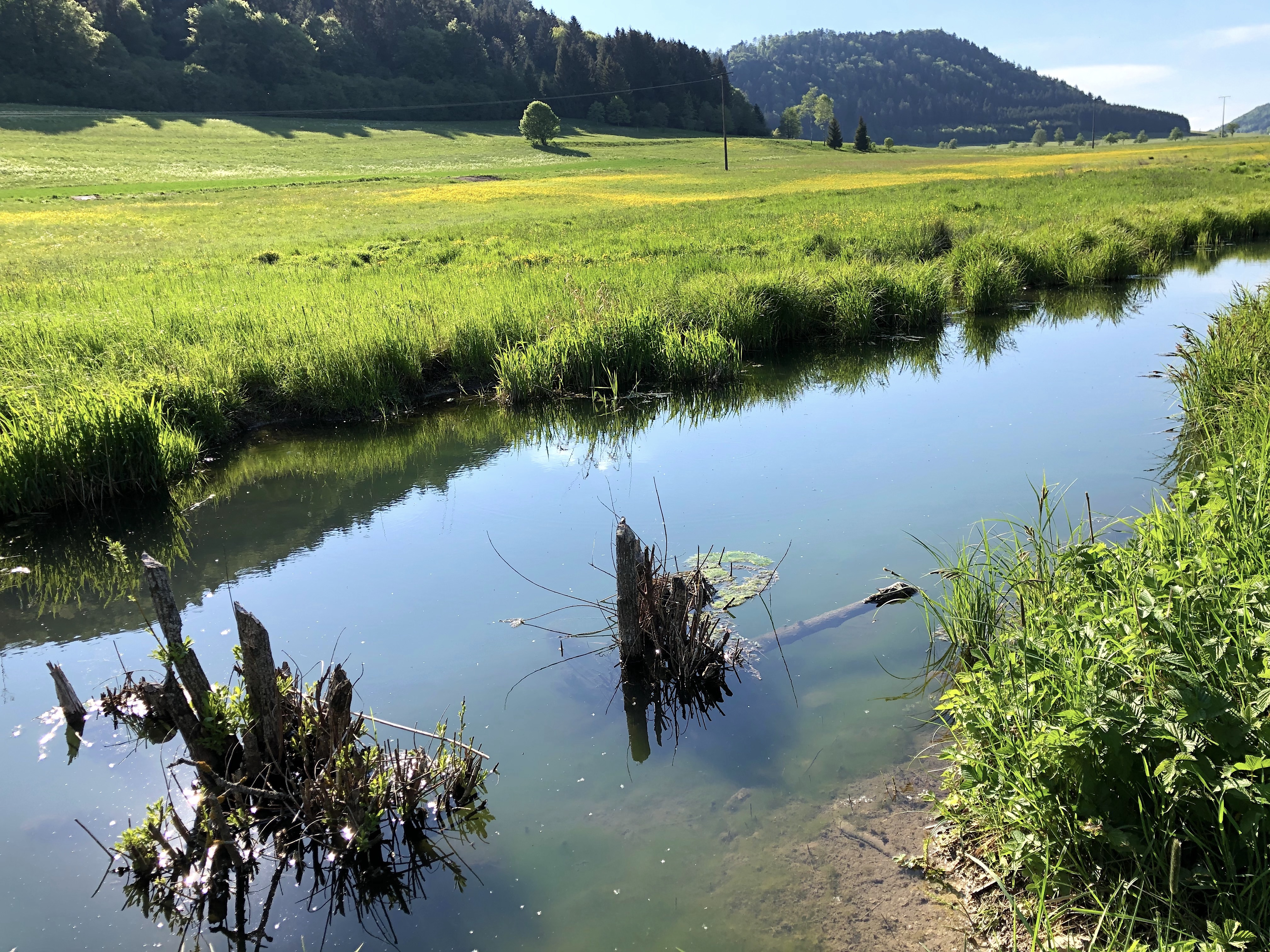
- Obere Bära south of Tieringen

Location
- Country: Germany
- State: Baden-Württemberg

Physical characteristics
- Mouth
  - location: Bära
  - coordinates: 48.1052°N 8.8962°E
- Length: 12.9 km (8.0 mi)

Basin features
- Progression: Bära→ Danube→ Black Sea

Obere Bära is a river of Baden-Württemberg, Germany. It is a headstream of the Bära.

The Obere Bära originates in the western part of the Swabian Jura directly on the European Watershed, near the albtrauf at the village of Tieringen in Meßstetten. Just .5 kilometres (0.31 mi) northwest of its upper course, on the other side of Tieringen, runs the Schlichem, which flows northwest by way of the Neckar to the Rhine.

The Obere Bära runs 12.8 kilometres (8.0 mi) southward, draining an area of 50.9 square kilometres (19.7 sq mi), and runs through the following towns and cities:

- Tieringen
- Oberdigisheim
- Unterdigisheim
- Nusplingen

== See also ==
- List of rivers of Baden-Württemberg
