= Laurenz Meyer =

German politician

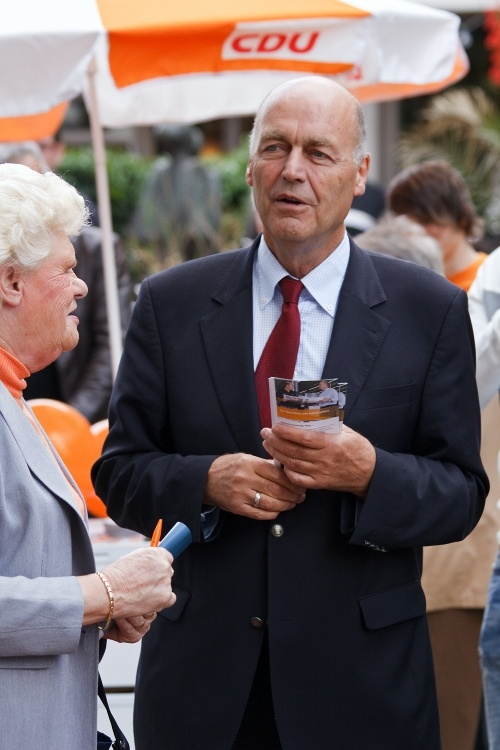
Meyer in 2009

Laurenz Meyer (born 15 February 1948) is a German politician of the Christian Democratic Union (CDU). From 2000 to 2004 he was general secretary of the CDU.

== Early life and education ==
Meyer was born in Salzkotten, North Rhine-Westphalia. After his Abitur (school-leaving) examinations in 1968, he completed a course of study in economics at the University of Münster, leaving in 1975 as a qualified economist. He was then employed at Vereinigte Elektrizitätswerke Westfalen, or VEW AG (which was later taken over by the RWE group) in Dortmund.

== Career ==
=== Party ===
Meyer has been a member of the CDU since 1968. From 1997 to 2001, he was state treasurer of the CDU in North Rhine-Westphalia. He has belonged to the federal executive of the CDU since April 2000 and was general secretary of the CDU from 20 November 2000 to 22 December 2004.

=== Elected representative ===
Meyer was on the Hamm city council from 1975 to 1995 and was CDU leader on the council from 1989 to 1995. In 1994, he campaigned for the office of Lord Mayor, but lost to Jürgen Wieland, the candidate of the SPD (Social Democratic Party).

From 1990 until 2003, Meyer was a member of the state parliament (Landtag) of North Rhine-Westphalia. Here he was party spokesperson for economic issues from 1990 to 1999, deputy leader from 1997 to 1999, and leader of the CDU in the state parliament from 23 February 1999 to 2 June 2000. After losing the 2000 election, Meyer had to give up his office as party leader to Jürgen Rüttgers. From 6 June to 6 December 2000, Meyer was then deputy speaker of the state parliament of North Rhine-Westphalia.

Since 2002 Laurenz Meyer has been a member of the German Federal Parliament (Bundestag). He entered parliament by being on the CDU's party list for North Rhine-Westphalia, in Germany's proportional representation electoral system.

=== RWE affair and resignation ===
On 10 December 2004, it was reported that Meyer (nicknamed Laurenz Nimmersatt, "Gluttonous Laurenz") was receiving power from RWE (which had taken over his former employer VEW in 2000) at a discounted employee rate, although he had parted company with the group in 1999. One week later, new allegations surfaced, according to which he was receiving payments from RWE even while he was General Secretary of the CDU. Meyer described these as "special dividends". In addition, Meyer was still receiving earnings as deputy speaker in the North Rhine-Westphalian state parliament and was thus receiving three salaries. The Bild am Sonntag newspaper reported on 19 December that CDU boss Angela Merkel had stripped her General Secretary of his powers. Close party colleagues demanded his resignation. On 20 December, Meyer announced that he would donate the amount in question (€81,800) to the charity SOS Children's Villages.

After pressure from the party's rank and file, Meyer resigned as general secretary on 22 December 2004. The reason for his resignation was that contrary to his description, the special payment was not a severance pay since Meyer returned to the company only after the CDU defeat at the North Rhine-Westphalian election in May 2000. This fact and the false information he provided to Angela Merkel made his situation untenable for the party. The received payments admitted by him and the announcement of a donation to SOS-Kinderdörfer were especially unable to pacify the party's branches in North Rhine-Westphalia and Schleswig-Holstein, which were involved with their area's election campaigns.

As a member of parliament, Meyer continued to receive the usual salary of €7,009 a month (€7,960 as of 2012, €8,252 as of 2013), plus the tax-free monthly expense allowance of €3,551 (€4,123 in 2013). Furthermore, he may reactivate his employment contract with the RWE energy company, from which he last drew an annual income of €112,381.

On 23 December 2004, RWE announced the result of an internal investigation into the payments made to Meyer. It found that 160,000 of 250,000 Deutsche Mark were unjustified and had been made by VEW as a result of a "communication error". In a statement on 17 December, Meyer had described this payment as "legally correct", but also admitted "...I have nevertheless become aware of the fact that many people have a problem understanding that at that time I accepted this money, since I went back into the company...".

Most recently, Meyer was employed as RWE's commercial director in the Arnsberg regional office.

== Personal life ==
Meyer is married and has four daughters. He is separated from his wife and lives with his partner in Hamm.
