= Karl Gengler =

German politician (1886–1974)

Member of the Bundestag; for Rottweil
- In office 7 September 1949 – 15 October 1957
- Preceded by: Constituency established
- Succeeded by: Bruno Heck

Personal details
- Born: 8 October 1886 Haguenau, German Empire
- Died: 9 October 1974 (aged 88) Rottweil, West Germany
- Party: Christian Democratic Union
- Children: 2

Karl Gengler (8 October 1886 – 9 October 1974) was a German politician of the Christian Democratic Union (CDU) and former member of the German Bundestag.

== Political career ==
From the first election until 1957 he was a member of the German Bundestag. He won the direct mandate in the Rottweil constituency in both 1949 and 1953. In the Bundestag he was deputy chairman of the Committee on Rules of Procedure and Immunity.

== Literature ==
Herbst, Ludolf; Jahn, Bruno (2002). Vierhaus, Rudolf (ed.). Biographisches Handbuch der Mitglieder des Deutschen Bundestages. 1949–2002 [Biographical Handbook of the Members of the German Bundestag. 1949–2002] (in German). München: De Gruyter - De Gruyter Saur. p. 1715. ISBN 978-3-11-184511-1.
