= Bärenthal =

German municipality

- Municipality
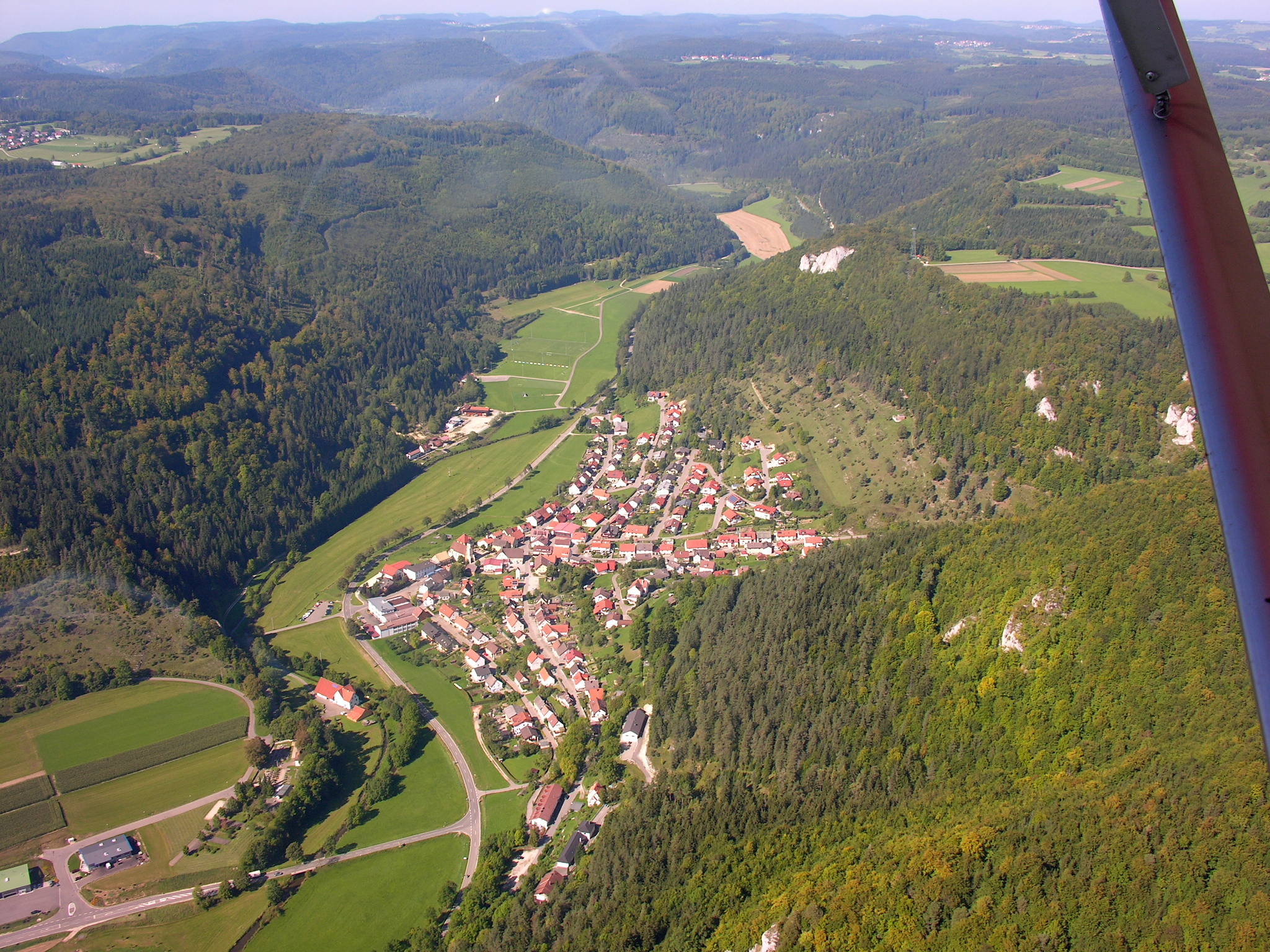
- Aerial view of Bärenthal

- Coat of arms

- Location of Bärenthal within Tuttlingen district
- Interactive map of Bärenthal
- Location within Germany Location within Baden-Württemberg
- Coordinates: 48°04′25″N 08°55′40″E
- Country: Germany
- State: Baden-Württemberg
- Admin. region: Freiburg
- District: Tuttlingen

Government
  - Mayor (2023–31): Morris Stoupal

Area
  - Total: 12.69 km^{2} (4.90 sq mi)
- Elevation: 669 m (2,195 ft)

Population (2025-12-31)
  - Total: 484
  - Density: 38.1/km^{2} (98.8/sq mi)
- Time zone: UTC+01:00 (CET)
  - Summer (DST): UTC+02:00 (CEST)
- Postal codes: 78580
- Dialling codes: 07466
- Vehicle registration: TUT
- Website: www.baerenthal.de

Bärenthal is a municipality in the district of Tuttlingen in Baden-Württemberg, Germany.

== History ==
Beuron Abbey gained possession of Bärenthal in 1751. It became a possession of the Principality of Hohenzollern-Sigmaringen in 1803 and was assigned to Oberamt Beuren until 1820 and then Oberamt Wald until 1860. In 1938, the district of Wald was dissolved and Bärenthal was assigned to the newly created Landkreis Sigmaringen. This district, too, was abolished in the 1973 Baden-Württemberg district reform and Bärenthal was placed in the newly organized district of Tuttlingen. The village grew to about its present size in 1960 and has, since 1999, been the least-populated municipality in the district of Tuttlingen.

== Geography ==
The municipality (Gemeinde) of Bärenthal is part of the Tuttlingen district of Baden-Württemberg, a state of the Federal Republic of Germany. It lies on the eastern extremity of the district, along its border with the Zollernalb district to the north. Bärenthal is physically located in the Großer Heuberg region of the High Swabian Jura, in the box valley of the Bära, which flows from north to south through the municipal area. Elevation above sea level in the municipal area ranges from a high of 930 meters (3,050 ft) Normalnull (NN) in the north to a low of 650 meters (2,130 ft) NN along the Bära.

Portions of the Federally-protected Hüttenberg and Galgenwiesen nature reserves are located in Bärenthal's municipal area.

== Coat of arms ==
Bärenthal's coat of arms is divided into two fields: the upper field is yellow and contains a blue bear, walking to the left, while the lower is blue and contains a yellow "b" whose stem is crossed. The bear is a folk etymological reference to the Bära river as the origin of "Bärenthal", and the crossed "b" to Beuron Abbey, from whom the blue-yellow tincture is also derived. This coat of arms was first proposed by the Sigmaringen State Archive in 1947 and was accepted by the municipal council in 1954. Official use was approved on 8 May 1973 by the Federal Ministry of the Interior, who also issued a municipal flag to Bärenthal on that date.

== Transportation ==
The primary road in Bärenthal is the L440, following the Bära.
