= Raichberg =

Mountain in Baden-Württemberg, Germany

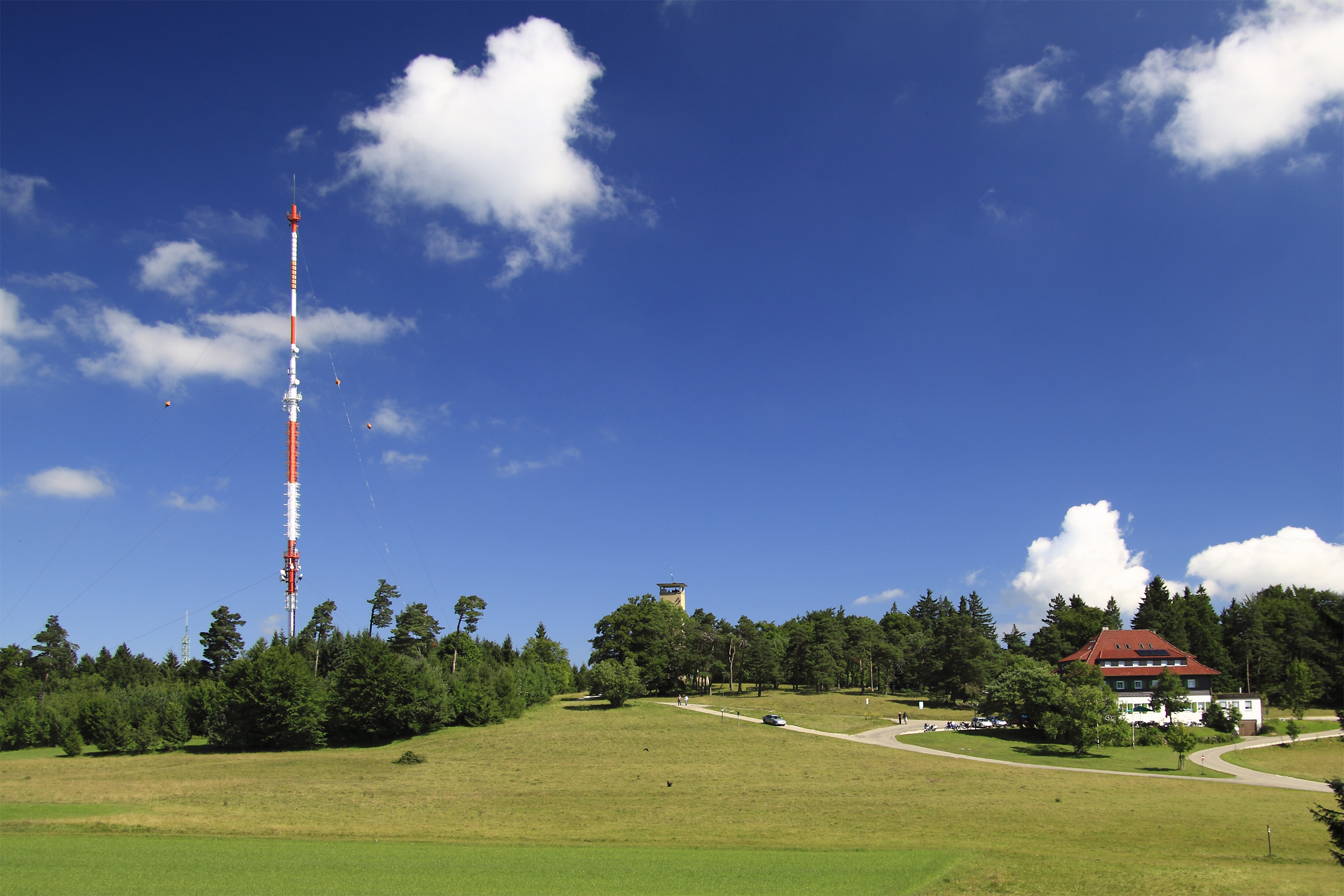
- Raichberg mountain with broadcast transmitter

Highest point
- Elevation: 956 m (3,136 ft)
- Coordinates: 48°18′20″N 8°59′35″E

Geography
- Location within Baden-Württemberg
- Location: Albstadt, Zollernalbkreis, Baden-Württemberg, Germany

Raichberg is a mountain of Baden-Württemberg, Germany, with an elevation of 956 meters (3,136 ft) above sea level. It is located in Zollernalbkreis close to the northwestern edge of the Schwäbische 'Alb'.

Situated on the summit is Nägelehaus, a guesthouse, as well as a 22-meter-high observation tower and the 137 meter high broadcast tower. In clear weather conditions, the observation tower offers an excellent panoramic view of the Black Forest and the Alps.

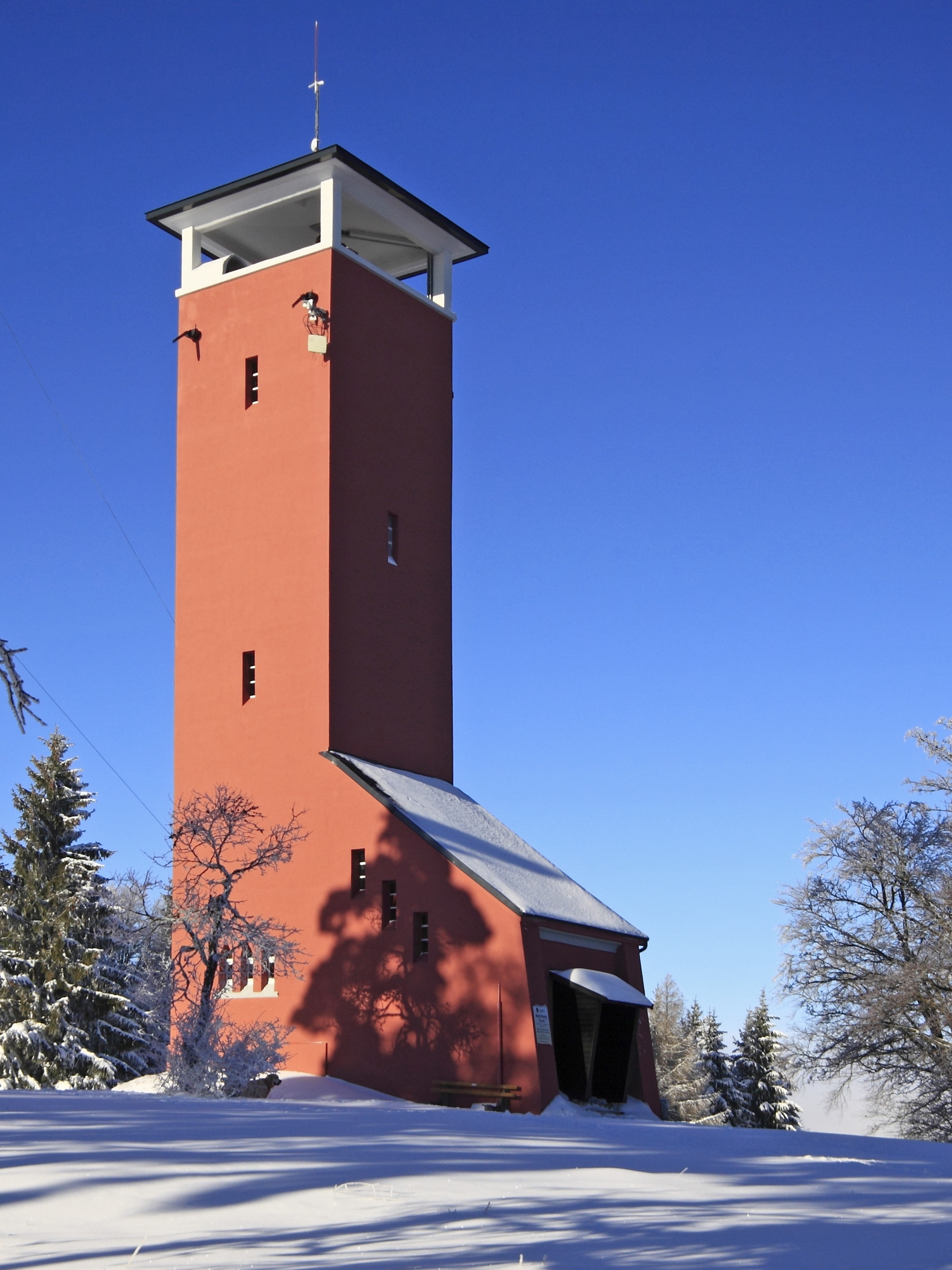
Observation tower
