= Raichberg Transmitter =

Coordinates: 48°18′21.15″N 8°59′31.96″E

The mast of Raichberg Transmitter until 2007

Raichberg transmitter is a broadcast facility for various FM radio and television programs operated by the Südwestrundfunk (SWR, "Southwest Broadcasting") on the Raichberg mountain (elevation 956 meters (3,136 ft)) in Albstadt, Baden-Württemberg, Germany. It uses a 137 meter (449 ft) guyed steel tube mast as the antenna tower. There is also a free-standing lattice tower for microwave radio.

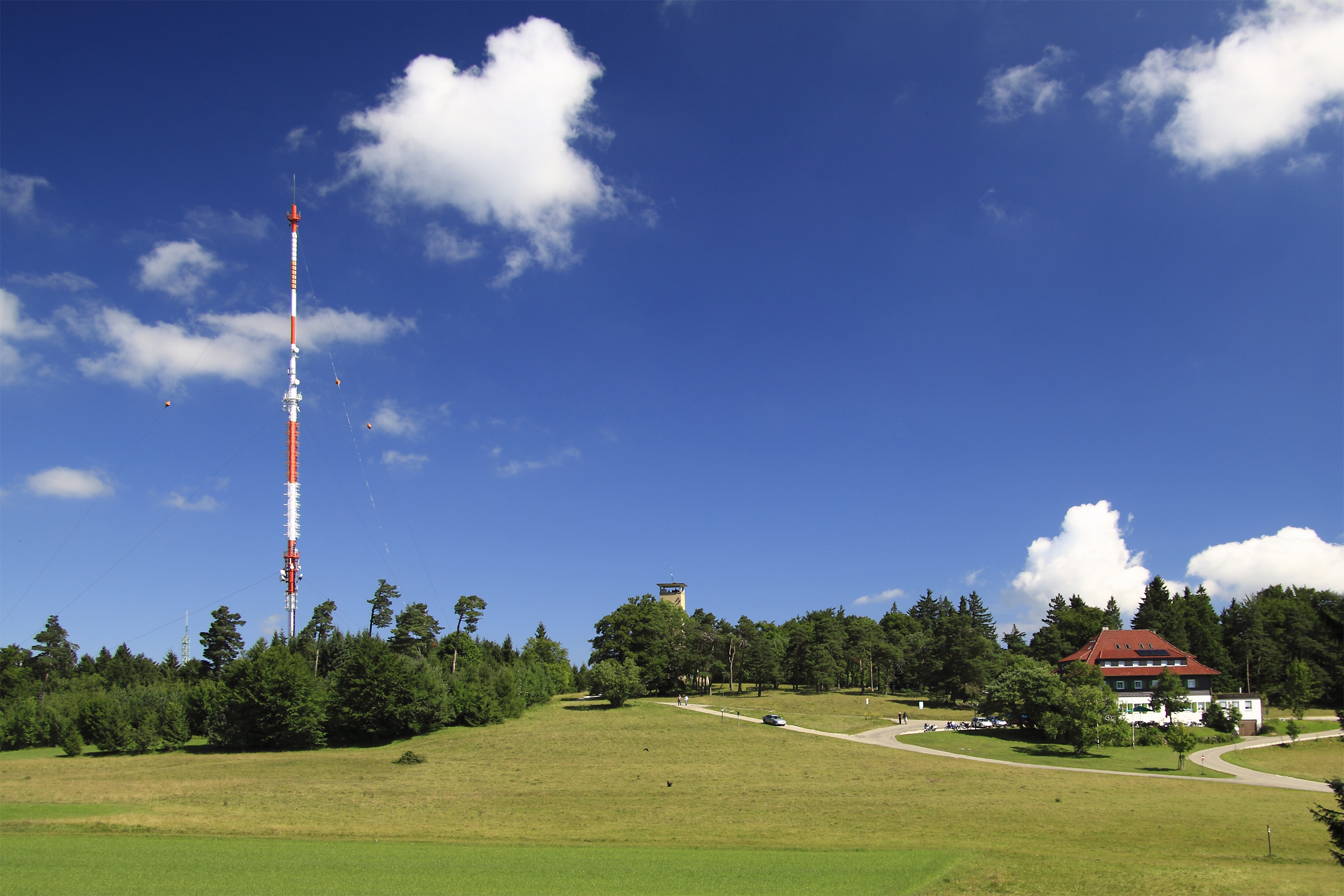
Raichberg mountain with broadcast transmitter

== History ==
The Raichberg station started broadcast service on 23 December 1950 (74 years ago) as an FM radio transmitter operating the Südwestfunks program SWF 1. The first transmitting antenna was installed at this time on the observation tower “Raichbergturm”, which is close to the current station. Since December 1954, a 57-meter (187 ft) high steel tube mast was used as an antenna support. As this tower could not carry TV broadcasting antennas, a new steel tube mast went into operation starting in 1971 (54 years ago). Between September and November 2007, the originally 147-meter (482 ft) high mast was converted to the upcoming digital DVB-T. The old analog VHF antenna was dismantled and a new 62-meter (203 ft) high UHF antenna segment for DVB-T was mounted on top, thereby shrinking the transmission tower from 147 to 137 meters (482 to 449 ft).

== See also ==
- List of masts
