= Venus of Hohle Fels =

Oldest known depiction of a human being

- Two views of the Venus of Hohle Fels figurine
- Material: Mammoth ivory
- Size: Height: 6 cm
- Created: 41,000 years ago
- Discovered: September 2008; Baden-Wurttemberg, Germany
- Present location: Blaubeuren, Baden-Wurttemberg, Germany

The Venus of Hohle Fels (also known as the Venus of Schelklingen; in German variously Venus vom Hohlen Fels, vom Hohle Fels; Venus von Schelklingen) is an Upper Paleolithic Venus figurine made of mammoth ivory that was unearthed in 2008 in Hohle Fels, a cave near Schelklingen, Germany, part of the Caves and Ice Age Art in the Swabian Jura UNESCO World Heritage Site. It is dated to between 42,000 and 40,000 years ago, belonging to the early Aurignacian, at the very beginning of the Upper Paleolithic, which is associated with the earliest presence of Cro-Magnons in Europe.

The figure is the oldest undisputed example of a depiction of a human being. In terms of figurative art only the lion-headed, zoomorphic Löwenmensch figurine is possibly older. The Venus is housed at the Prehistoric Museum of Blaubeuren (Urgeschichtliches Museum Blaubeuren).

== Context ==
The Swabian Alb region of Germany has a number of caves that have yielded many mammoth-ivory artifacts of the Upper Paleolithic period. Approximately 25 items have been discovered to date. These include the Löwenmensch figurine of Hohlenstein-Stadel dated to 40,000 years ago and an ivory flute found at Geißenklösterle, dated to 42,000 years ago. This mountainous region is located in Baden-Württemberg and is bounded by the Danube in the southeast, the upper Neckar in the northwest, and in the southwest it rises to the higher mountains of the Black Forest.

This concentration of evidence of full behavioral modernity, including figurative art and instrumental music among humans in the period of 30,000 to 40,000 years ago, is unique worldwide and its discoverer, archaeologist Nicholas Conard, speculates that the bearers of the Aurignacian culture in the Swabian Alb may be credited with the invention, not just of figurative art and music, but possibly, the earliest religious practices as well. Within a distance of 70 cm (27.6 in) to the Venus figurine, Conard's team also found a flute made from a vulture bone. Additional artifacts excavated from the same cave layer included flint-knapping debris, worked bone, and carved ivory as well as remains of tarpans, reindeer, cave bears, woolly mammoths, and Alpine ibexes.

== Discovery ==
External videos
- , Nature - an extensive discussion of the artifact by two team members who discovered and study the figurine

The discovery of the Venus of Hohle Fels by the archaeological team led by archaeology professor Nicholas Conard of the University of Tübingen pushed back the date of the oldest known human figurative art, (Note: The grid or cross-hatch patterns found engraved at the Blombos Cave in South Africa, dating to 75,000 years ago, may or may not be considered "abstract art".) by several millennia, (Note: by at least 5,000 years, if the 35,000 BP date is compared to that of the Venus of Galgenberg, or by as much as 10,000 years if the 40,000 BP date is accepted.) establishing that works of art were being produced throughout the Aurignacian Period.

The remarkably early figurine was discovered in September 2008 in a cave called Hohle Fels (Swabian German for 'hollow rock') near Schelklingen, some 15 km (9 mi) west of Ulm, Baden-Württemberg, in southwestern Germany. The find was reported by Conard and his team in Nature. The figurine was found in the cave hall, approximately 20 m (66 ft) from the entrance and 3 m (10 ft) below the current ground level. Nearby a bone flute dating to approximately 42,000 years ago was found, the oldest known uncontested musical instrument.

In 2015, the team presented two further pieces of carved mammoth ivory discovered at the site that have been identified as parts of a second female figurine.

== Description ==
The figurine was sculpted from a woolly mammoth tusk and it has broken into fragments, of which six have been recovered, with the left arm and shoulder still missing. In place of the head, the figurine has a perforated protrusion, which may have allowed it to be worn as an amulet.

== Interpretation ==
The discoverer, anthropologist Nicholas Conard, said: "This [figure] is about sex, reproduction... [it is] an extremely powerful depiction of the essence of being female". Anthropologist, Paul Mellars of Cambridge University has suggested that—by modern standards—the figurine "could be seen as bordering on the pornographic".

Anthropologists from Victoria University of Wellington have suggested that such figurines were not depictions of beauty, but represented "hope for survival and longevity, within well-nourished and reproductively successful communities", reflecting the conventional interpretation of these types of figurines as representing a fertility goddess.

== See also ==
- List of Stone Age art
- Löwenmensch figurine
- Prehistoric art
- Venus of Berekhat Ram
- Venus of Tan-Tan
- Venus of Willendorf
- Venus of Dolní Věstonice
