= Sirgenstein Cave =

Cave in Germany

- Sirgensteinhöhle
- The Sirgenstein
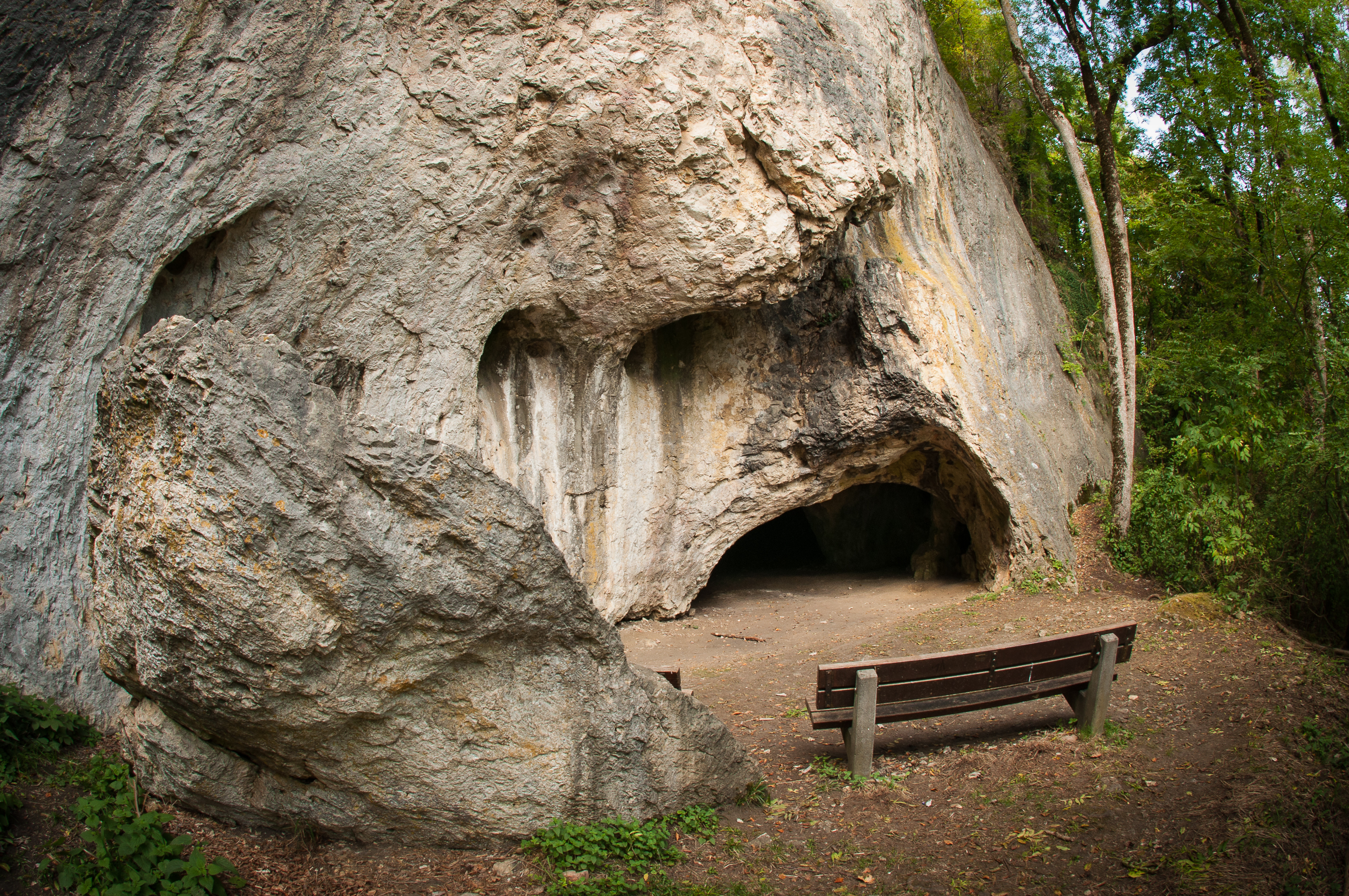
- Sirgenstein Cave entry

- location in Germany Sirgenstein Cave (Germany)
- 48°23′13″N 9°45′40″E
- Type: karst cave
- Periods: Palaeolithic, Neolithic, Bronze Age, Iron Age
- Cultures: Mousterian, Aurignacian, Gravettian, Magdalenian
- Associated with: Homo neanderthalensis, Homo sapiens
- Location: Ach River valley
- Region: Swabian Jura, Baden-Württemberg, Germany

Site notes
- Material: limestone
- Length: 40 m (130 ft)
- Excavation dates: 1906
- Archaeologists: Robert Rudolf Schmidt (1882–1950)

UNESCO World Heritage Site
- Official name: Caves and Ice Age Art in the Swabian Jura
- Type: Cultural
- Criteria: iii
- Designated: 2017 (41st session)
- Reference no.: 1527
- Region: Europe and North America

The small Sirgenstein Cave, German: Sirgensteinhöhle is situated 565 m (1,854 ft) above sea level inside the 20 m (66 ft) high Sirgenstein, a limestone rock. The cave sits 35 m (115 ft) above the Ach River valley bottom in the central Swabian Jura, southern Germany. Archaeologist R. R. Schmidt excavated the site in 1906 during which he identified indices of prehistoric human presence. He recorded the complete stratigraphic sequence of Palaeolithic and Neolithic origin. In his 1910 analysis Schmidt inspired future archaeologists with his pioneering concept of including the excavation site within its geographic region, contextualizing it within a wide scientific spectrum and demonstrated valuable results as he correlated the Sirgenstein layer structure to those of prehistoric sites in France. Mammoth ivory beads dating from 39,000 to 35,000 years ago have been uncovered at the cave. Because of its historical and cultural significance and its testimony to the development of Paleolithic art, the cave was inscribed on the UNESCO World Heritage List as part of the Caves and Ice Age Art in the Swabian Jura site in 2017.

== Site ==
Sirgenstein Cave is besides the better known sites Hohle Fels and Geissenklösterle, one of three caves that bear evidence of prehistoric human presence, located in the Ach River valley within a distance of 5 km (3.1 mi) between Schelklingen village and Blaubeuren village, around 20 km (12 mi) west of Ulm city in Baden-Württemberg.

The 6 m (20 ft) wide cave entrance is located under a rock overhang and opens to the southwest and in a pair of ceiling openings at the opposite end. Its total length is 40 m (130 ft), its width around 5 m (16 ft) and an average height of 3 to 4 m (9.8 to 13.1 ft). Situated at the Sirgenstein limestone rock's southern face is a rockshelter (Abri). Its sediment analysis revealed temporary occupation phases of Magdalenian hunter groups.

The oldest known written record of the site dates to the Dominican clergyman Felix Fabri's 1488 book Historia Suevorum (Swabian History). Oscar Fraas, another clergyman and 19th century scientist, educated at the University of Tübingen initiated systematic studies of the area in 1866.

== Stratigraphy ==
Schmidt, who had the site completely excavated in summer and autumn 1906, finished his analysis in 1910 and published the 1912 monograph "The diluvial prehistory of Germany" (Die diluviale Vorzeit Deutschlands). In a synthesis of his own field data and the contemporary state of research he addressed archaeological questions interdisciplinary and placed the Sirgenstein Cave's research within the Ach River cave context, the Swabian Jura and the then known European context. He also recognized and articulated obvious correlations between the already voluminous French and German records of human, biological and cultural prehistory. Schmidt divided the Sirgenstein Cave sediments into eight (I to VIII) relevant and one sterile strata. Although stratigraphically consistent, the most recent cultures of the Upper Paleolithic layers received clarification.

- VIII and VII: The lowest Middle Palaeolithic strata with material of Neanderthal Mousterian cultural assemblages. Lithic objects and stone tools were re-dated in 1996, re-analysis of the sediments suggests that these layers represent in fact only one horizon.
- no label: A thin and archaeologically sterile layer, that contained arctic microfauna of small rodents, distinctly separates the deeper Mousterian Middle Palaeolithic deposits from the Aurignacian Upper Paleolithic sediments.
- VI, V and IV: Upper Paleolithic layers of the Aurignacian culture that contain bone tools and stone tools, retouched blades, gouges, nosed end scrapers, ivory items, arrow heads and perforated ivory beads. New among the animal fossils are Woolly rhinoceros, Cave lion, Red deer and wolf. Very sparse Homo sapiens dental remains, one canine and two molars account for two individuals.
- III, II and I: Incorrectly labeled Proto-Solutréen by Schmidt, layer III and II were later correctly assigned to the Gravettian culture, that apart from bone fragments and ivory items, contained hardly any stone tools. reindeer, horse and snowshoe hare are most abundant.
- The top layer I was re-attributed to the Magdalenian culture. It contained gouges, drills, scrapers and fragmented arrow tips made from antlers and ivory. Among the animal fossils are reindeer, horse, snowshoe hare, grouse, cave bear, mammoth and a small number of ibex remnants.
- unlabeled sediments deposited during the Bronze Age and Iron Age cover the prehistoric sequence
- AMS dating of bone point samples from the Aurignacian and Gravettian layers to an age between 30,000 and 27,000 years ago confirmed consistency of subsequent cultural corrections.

=== Rock shelter ===
Excavated in 1937 by Gustav Riek, the rock shelter (Abri) on the Sirgenstein's southern face is about 2.5 m (8.2 ft) wide, 1.5 m (4.9 ft) deep and situated around 7 m (23 ft) above the cave site. The small number of distinct stone tools and animal remains retrieved reasonably supports the idea of occasional use during the Late Magdalenian period.

== Human occupation ==
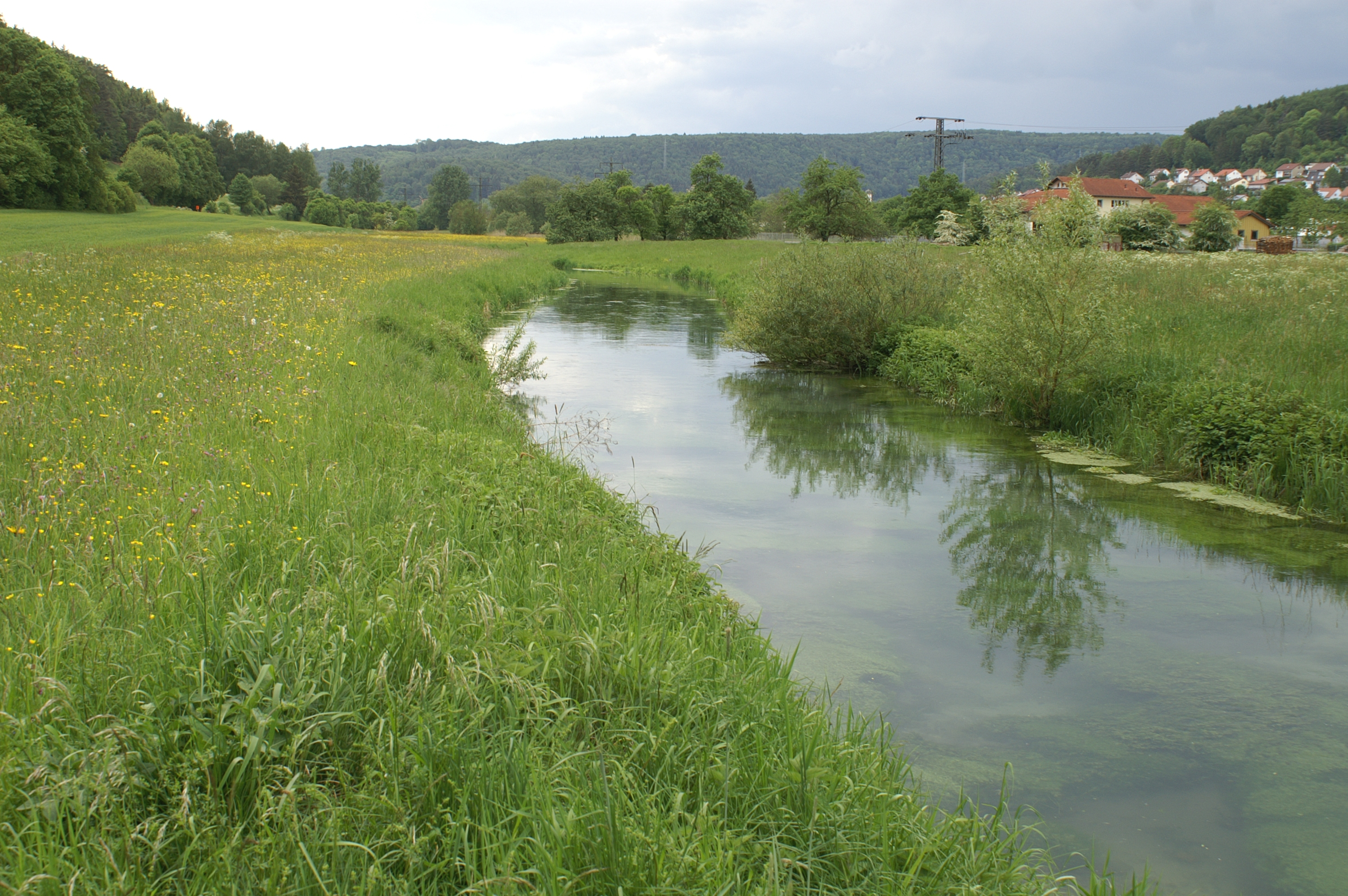
Ach River valley near Schelklingen

Humans predominantly occupied the cave entrance, where fireplaces and hearths were preferably placed during the entire occupation sequence. The oldest traces of human activity between 50,000 and 35,000 years ago are Neanderthal fireplaces and pits with charred bones, that had been split for marrow extraction. Stone tools were crafted from local materials. The study of juvenile remains among the wild horse fossils lead Schmidt to conclude that the site was only occupied during the winter season.

A thin sediment layer without traces of human presence suggests that Sirgenstein was not a location where Neanderthals had yielded to sudden Homo sapiens intrusion.

The following Aurignacian cultural sequence is characterized by bone points with simple bases and numerous end scrapers. AMS dates for the Sirgenstein Aurignacian obtained in 2003 produced an average date range of around 27,000 years ago for layer V and 30,500 years ago for layer VI. These periods are distinctly more recent than those of the merely 5 km (3.1 mi) distant Geissenklösterle Aurignacian. Ivory figurines or other individual abstract pieces of art for which the region is well known are absent at Sirgenstein, however, objects of personal decoration like perforated ivory beads are documented. The inner parts of the cave were more frequented only after the last glacial period beginning in the Magdalenian period.

== Faunal deposits ==
Tübingen University palaeontologist E.F. Koken conducted a faunal analysis in 1912, but he published no exact quantitative list and rather organized all species' occurrence in unreliable categories, such as "common" or "very common". Researchers reported in a publication of 2004, that an attempt to reanalyze and quantify the faunal fossils of the Middle Palaeolithic layers failed, because many of the fossils Schmidt had excavated and mentioned in his analysis are missing in the collections of the University of Tübingen. Schmidt then wrote, which can no longer be confirmed, that 90% of the remains in the Middle Palaeolithic layers were cave bear fossils, wild horse was the second most abundant species, followed by reindeer and giant deer. Mammoth is represented by a tusk fragment from only a single juvenile individual. As numerous of the large bones, the cave bears included, were split or showed cut marks and impact fractures, Schmidt reasoned that all these animals were hunted by the human occupants.

In the context of a 2002 to 2012 morphological and biometrical analysis and study on European Pleistocene species migration and extinction a Tübingen research team reconstructed an evolutionary process in the Ach Valley sites Hohle Fels, Geissenklösterle and Sirgenstein by observing replacement among the cave bear species of Ursus spelaeus by Ursus ingressus. Based on mitochondrial DNA analysis of fossils, the latest occurrence of Ursus spelaeus dates to around 31,500 years ago, the earliest record of a single specimen of Ursus ingressus dates to 36,300 years ago. Only around 32,000 years ago Ursus ingressus fossils of various mtDNA haplotypes begin to appear again. The five hundred-year span until the final disappearance of the Ursus spelaeus, around 31,500 years ago, is considered to be the main intrusion/replacement phase of Ursus ingressus.

== See also ==
- Brillenhöhle
- Bockstein Cave
- Hohle Fels
