= Geissenklösterle =

Cave in Germany

- Geißenklösterle (German)
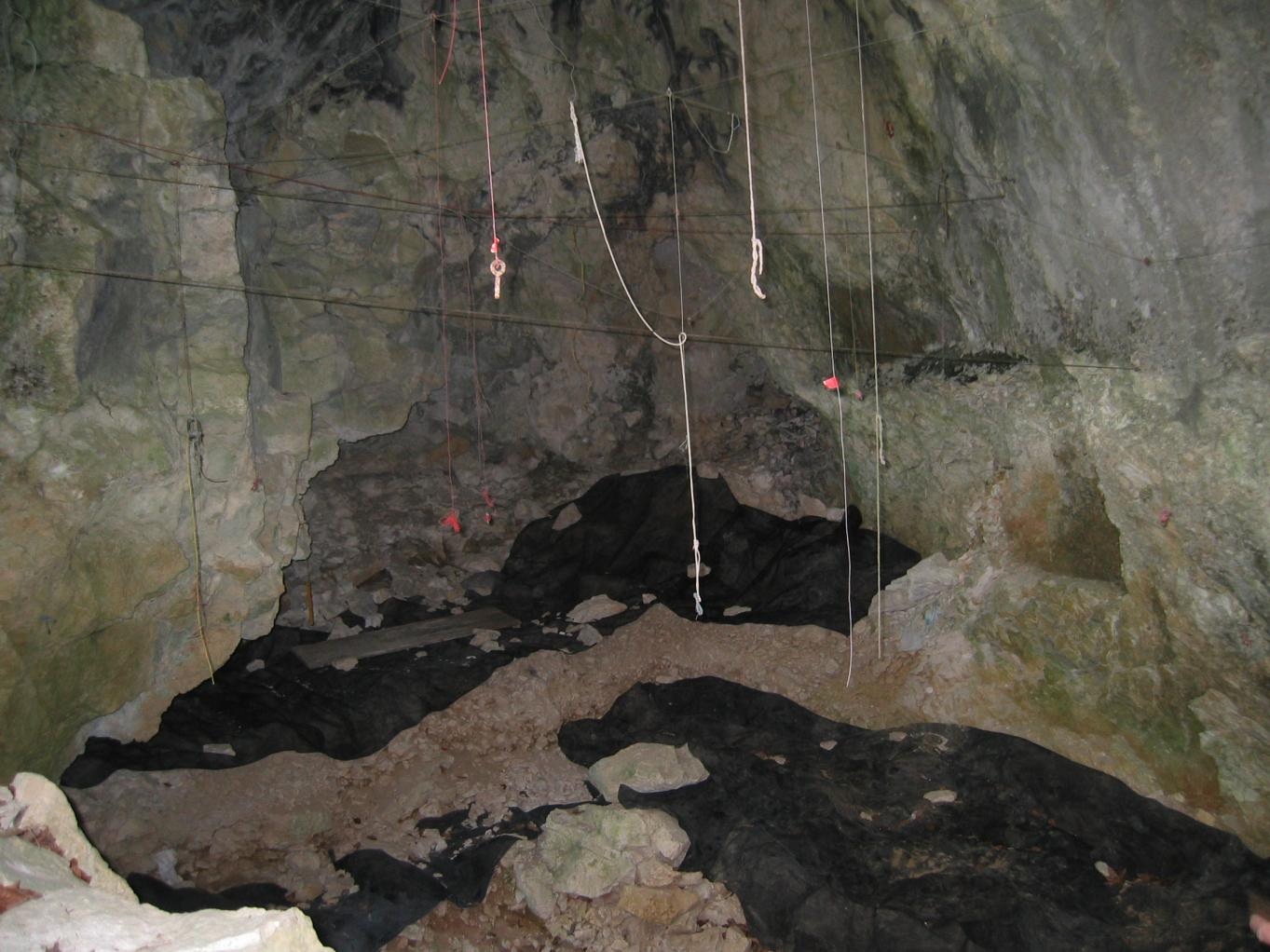
- Geissenklösterle Cave interior

- Location in Germany Geissenklösterle (Baden-Württemberg)
- 48°23′54″N 9°46′20″E
- Type: karst cave
- Periods: Upper Palaeolithic to Middle Ages
- Cultures: Aurignacian
- Location: Blaubeuren
- Region: Ach Valley, Swabian Jura, Baden-Württemberg, Germany

Site notes
- Material: limestone Karst
- Excavation dates: 1973, 1991, 2001 to 2002
- Archaeologists: Eberhard Wagner, Joachim Hahn, Nicholas Conard

UNESCO World Heritage Site
- Official name: Caves and Ice Age Art in the Swabian Jura
- Type: Cultural
- Criteria: iii
- Designated: 2017 (41st session)
- Reference no.: 1527
- Region: Europe and North America

Geissenklösterle (German: Geißenklösterle) is an archaeological site of significance for the central European Upper Paleolithic, located near the town of Blaubeuren in the Swabian Jura in Baden-Württemberg, southern Germany. First explored in 1963, the cave contains traces of early prehistoric art from between 43,000 and 30,000 years ago, including some of the oldest-known musical instruments and several animal figurines. Because of the historical and cultural importance of these findings, in 2017 the site became part of the UNESCO World Heritage Site Caves and Ice Age Art in the Swabian Jura.

== Overview ==
It is one of a number of caves where early modern humans in the Aurignacian, between 43,000 and 30,000 years ago left traces of early artwork, including the Vogelherd, Brillenhöhle, Grosse Grotte, Hohle Fels and Hohlenstein-Stadel caves. The cave contains sediments, that were divided into six levels belonging to the Aurignacian and seven levels of the Gravettian. Levels below are accredited to the Middle Paleolithic and those on top reach from the Western European Magdalenian (between 17,000 and 12,000 years ago) to the Middle Ages.

The Aurignacian levels date to between 43,000 and 32,000 years ago, and have yielded stone tools, artefacts made from antlers, bones and ivory. Among the most notable items are two flutes carved from bird bone and mammoth ivory, the oldest known musical instruments with an age of 42,000 to 43,000 years. The flutes were able to play distinct melodies, and music was likely an integral part of the societies living in the region at the time.

In addition to the flutes, many carved figurines were uncovered in Geissenklösterle. Many of these figurines depict typical Ice Age animals, including mammoths, bison, and cave lions. They are generally very small, measuring between 2.5 and 10 cm (1 and 4 in). An ivory relief of a human was also uncovered. Called the Adorant of Geißenklösterle, it depicts a figure with raised arms and rows of small notches on the reverse. Although the significance of these figurines is still unknown, they may have been effigies of a primitive religion.

== Modern history ==
Geissenklösterle was first archaeologically explored in 1963. Systematic excavations began in 1973, from 1974 to 2002 sponsored by the State of Baden-Württemberg. A 1983 monographic publication summarizes the excavation results up to that time. However, only a small amount of the cave has been excavated.

== UNESCO World Heritage Site ==
In January 2016, the federal government of Germany applied for the status of World Heritage Site for two valleys with six caves named Höhlen der ältesten Eiszeitkunst ("Caves with the oldest Ice Age art"). The site would encompass areas in the Lonetal (valley of the Lone) and the Achtal (valley of the Ach) both in the southern Swabian Jura. The former includes the caves Hohlenstein-Stadel, Vogelherd and Bocksteinhöhle, the latter Geissenklösterle, Hohle Fels and Sirgenstein Cave. Each valley would contain a core area of around 3 to 4 km (1.9 to 2.5 mi) length, surrounded by a buffer zone of a least 100 m (330 ft) width.

In the argument why these sites deserve recognition as a part of the universal human heritage, the area is described as the source of the currently oldest known (non-stationary) works of human art in the form of carved animal and humanoid figurines as well as the oldest surviving musical instruments. Their creators lived, were inspired and worked in and around these caves. The caves also served as the repositories of the figurines which may have been used in a religious context. In addition, they were the venue where performers used the excavated musical instruments and where the social groups lived from which the artists sprang.

The committee awarded the status of WHS in July 2017.

== Gallery ==
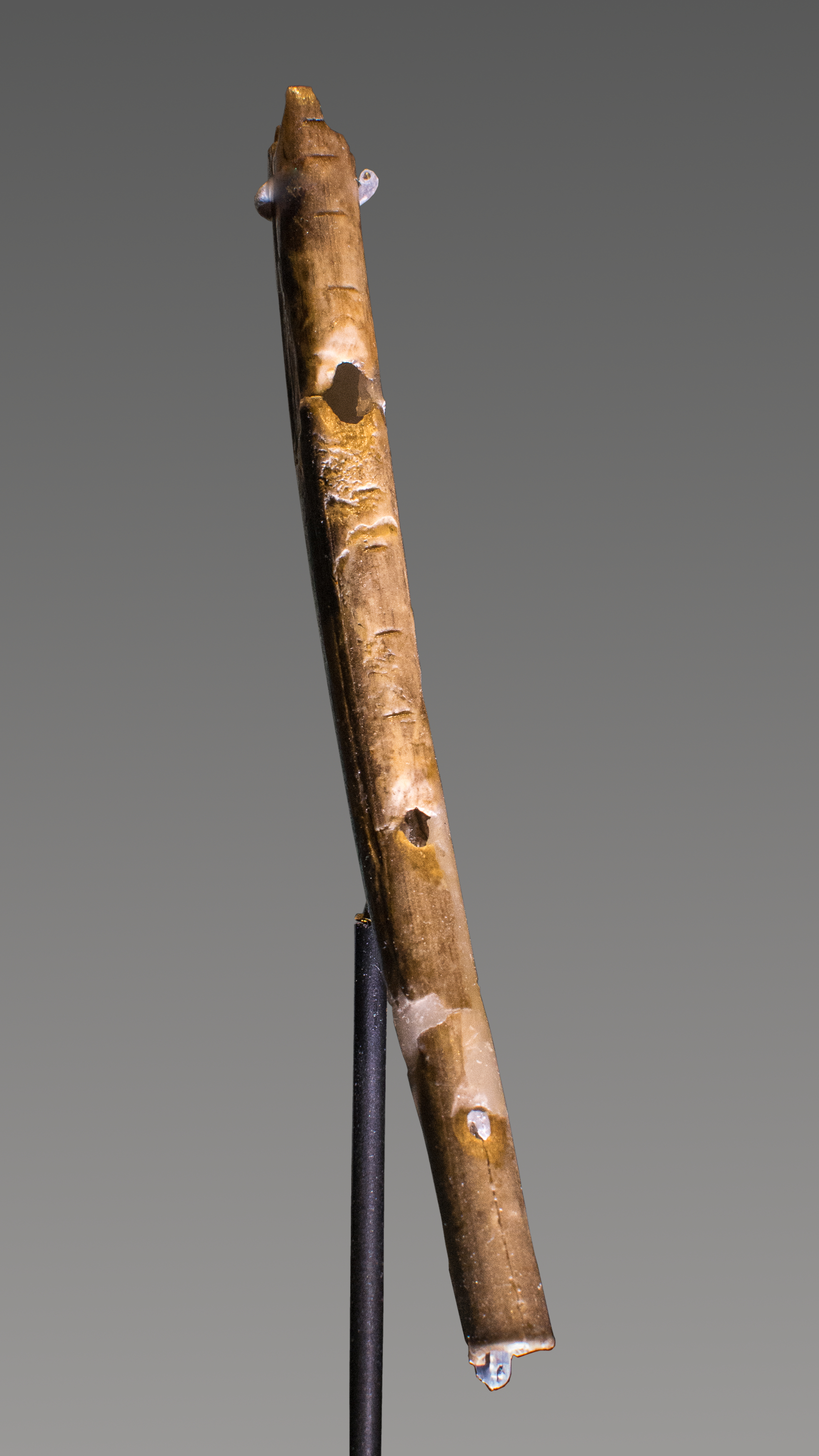
Bone flute from Geißenklösterle. Aurignacian culture

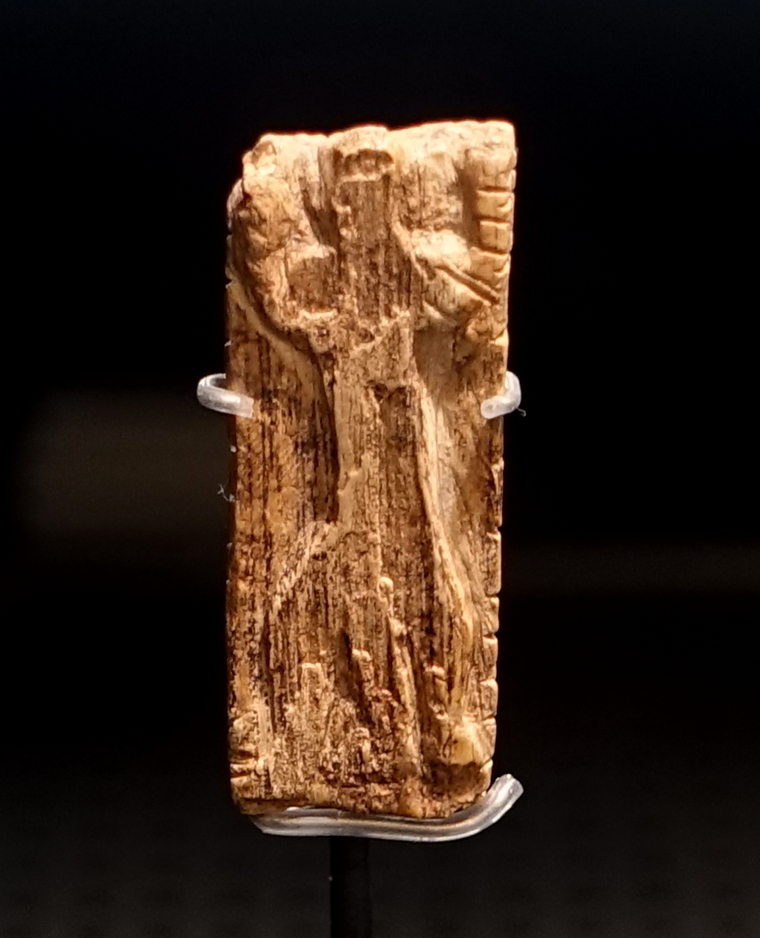
Adorant from the Geißenklösterle cave, mammoth ivory, Aurignacian culture

== See also ==
- Adorant from the Geißenklösterle cave
- Venus of Hohle Fels
- Vogelherd Cave
- Brillenhöhle

== Literature ==
- Nicolas Conard, Maria Malina: Abschließende Ausgrabungen im Geißenklösterle bei Blaubeuren, Alb-Donau-Kreis. in: Archäologische Ausgrabungen Baden-Württemberg, Theiss, Stuttgart 2001, p. 17–21. ISSN 0724-8954
- J. Hahn: Die Geißenklösterle-Höhle im Achtal bei Blaubeuren. in: Forschungen und Berichte zur Vor- und Frühgeschichte in Baden-Württemberg, Theiss, Stuttgart, 21, 1988,262. ISBN 3-8062-0794-1 ISSN 0724-4347
