= Ach (Blau) =

River in Germany

- The Ach at Schelklingen

- Mouth of Ach

Location
- Country: Germany
- State: Baden-Württemberg

Physical characteristics
- Mouth
  - location: Blau
  - coordinates: 48°24′57″N 9°47′10″E
- Length: 10.2 km (6.3 mi)

Basin features
- Progression: Blau→ Danube→ Black Sea

The Ach, also called Aach, is a river of Baden-Württemberg, Germany. It flows into the Blau in Blaubeuren.

== Geography ==
=== Source ===
The river Ach has its source west of Schelklingen in the Achursprung (535 m above sea level), a karst spring at the Dreikönigsmühle and about 500 m south of the monastery Urspring. It is a circular, bluish shimmering spring pot with an average flow of 440 litres per second (min. 110 L/s, max. 1,200 L/s).

=== Course ===
After only about 100 m of river, the longer and more water-rich Urspring, which has its source near the monastery Urspring, flows into the river on the left side. The Ach runs along its entire length in a valley of the Urdonau. Until Schelklingen it flows in an easterly direction, but then turns to the northeast. Before its mouth, the Ach flows around the Bruckfels near Weiler at the Geißenklösterle and the Weilerhalde in two wide river loops before it flows through Blaubeuren and joins the still young Blau at 515 m above sea level.

On its 10.2 km long path the Ach falls 20 m in height, which corresponds to a mean bed gradient of 2 ‰.

== Sights and structures ==
In Schelklingen are the ruins of Hohenschelklingen Castle and Saint Afra's Chapel with its Gothic fresco cycle. In the Ach valley are the Hohler Fels, one of the largest caverns in the Swabian Jura and south Germany, in which archaeologically important discoveries were made. On the opposite side of the valley stands the Sirgenstein, a twenty-metre-high rock with the Sirgenstein Cave with traces of the Stone Age and with a medieval ruined castle. Further down the valley are the ruins of Günzelburg Castle and another Stone Age cave, Geißenklösterle, and yet another Stone Age cave, the Brillenhöhle. In Blaubeuren are the Blautopf and, nearby, the former Blaubeuren Abbey with its abbey church, the ruins of the Rusenschloß and the hammer mill.

== See also ==
- List of rivers of Baden-Württemberg
