= Urspring =

Urspring may refer to:

- Urspring (Ach), a river of Baden-Württemberg, Germany, tributary of the Ach
- Ehingen Urspring, a professional basketball team based in Ehingen, Germany
- Urspring, a village of the town Lonsee, Baden-Württemberg, Germany
- Urspring, a quarter of the municipality Steingaden, Bavaria, Germany
