= Schelklingen =

- Town
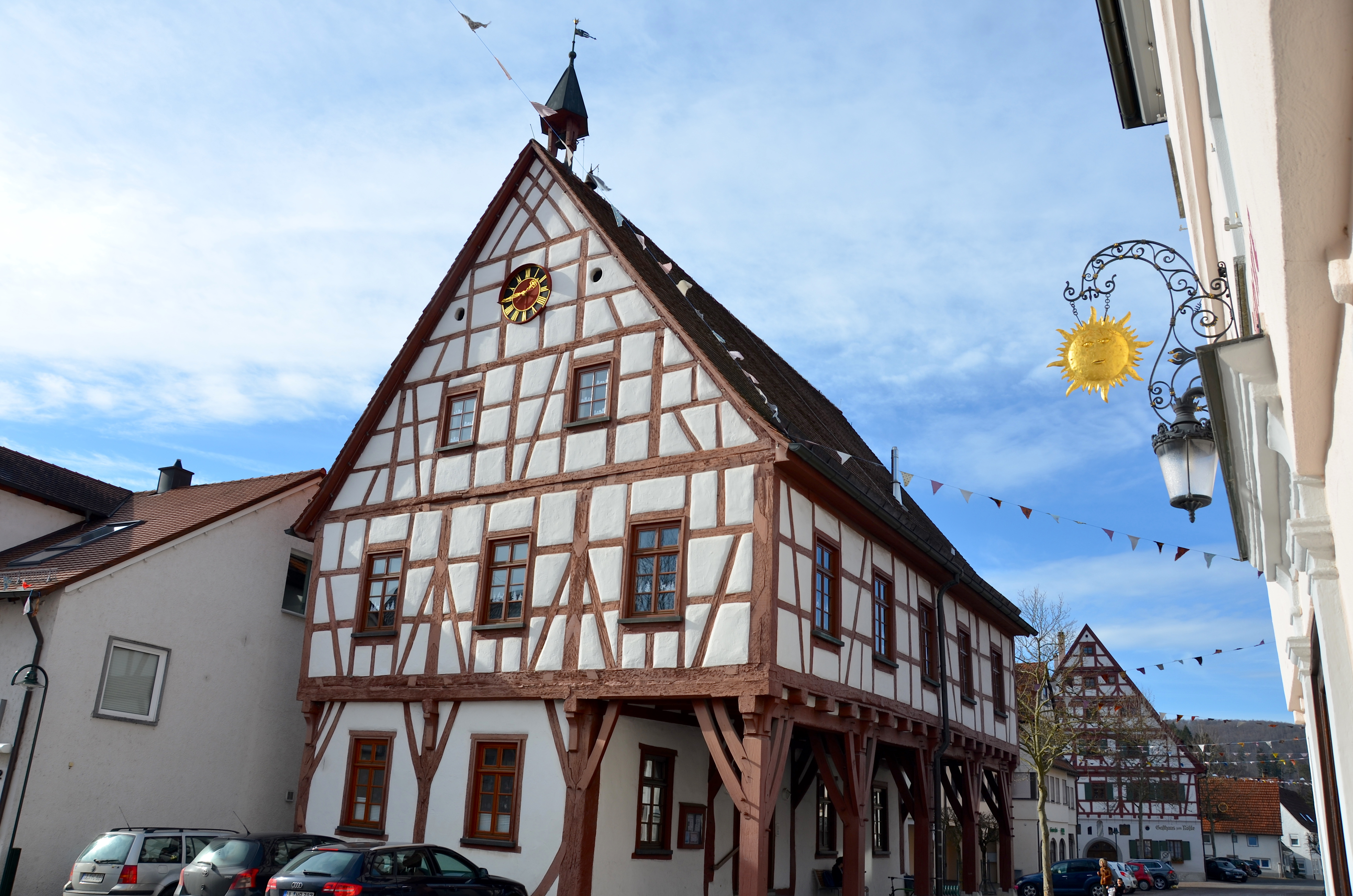
- Old Town Hall

- Flag Coat of arms

- Location of Schelklingen within Alb-Donau-Kreis district
- Interactive map of Schelklingen
- Location within Germany Location within Baden-Württemberg
- Coordinates: 48°22′32″N 9°43′57″E
- Country: Germany
- State: Baden-Württemberg
- Admin. region: Tübingen
- District: Alb-Donau-Kreis

Government
  - Mayor (2023–31): Ulrich Ruckh

Area
  - Total: 75.24 km^{2} (29.05 sq mi)
- Elevation: 540 m (1,770 ft)

Population (2025-12-31)
  - Total: 6,564
  - Density: 87.24/km^{2} (226.0/sq mi)
- Time zone: UTC+01:00 (CET)
  - Summer (DST): UTC+02:00 (CEST)
- Postal codes: 89598–89601
- Dialling codes: 07394, 07384
- Vehicle registration: UL
- Website: www.schelklingen.de

Schelklingen (German pronunciation: [ˈʃɛlklɪŋən]) is a town in the district of Alb-Donau in Baden-Württemberg in Germany. It is situated 10 km north of Ehingen, and 20 km west of Ulm. Schelklingen and 82% of its territory form part of the Swabian Jura Biosphere Reserve.

== Geography ==
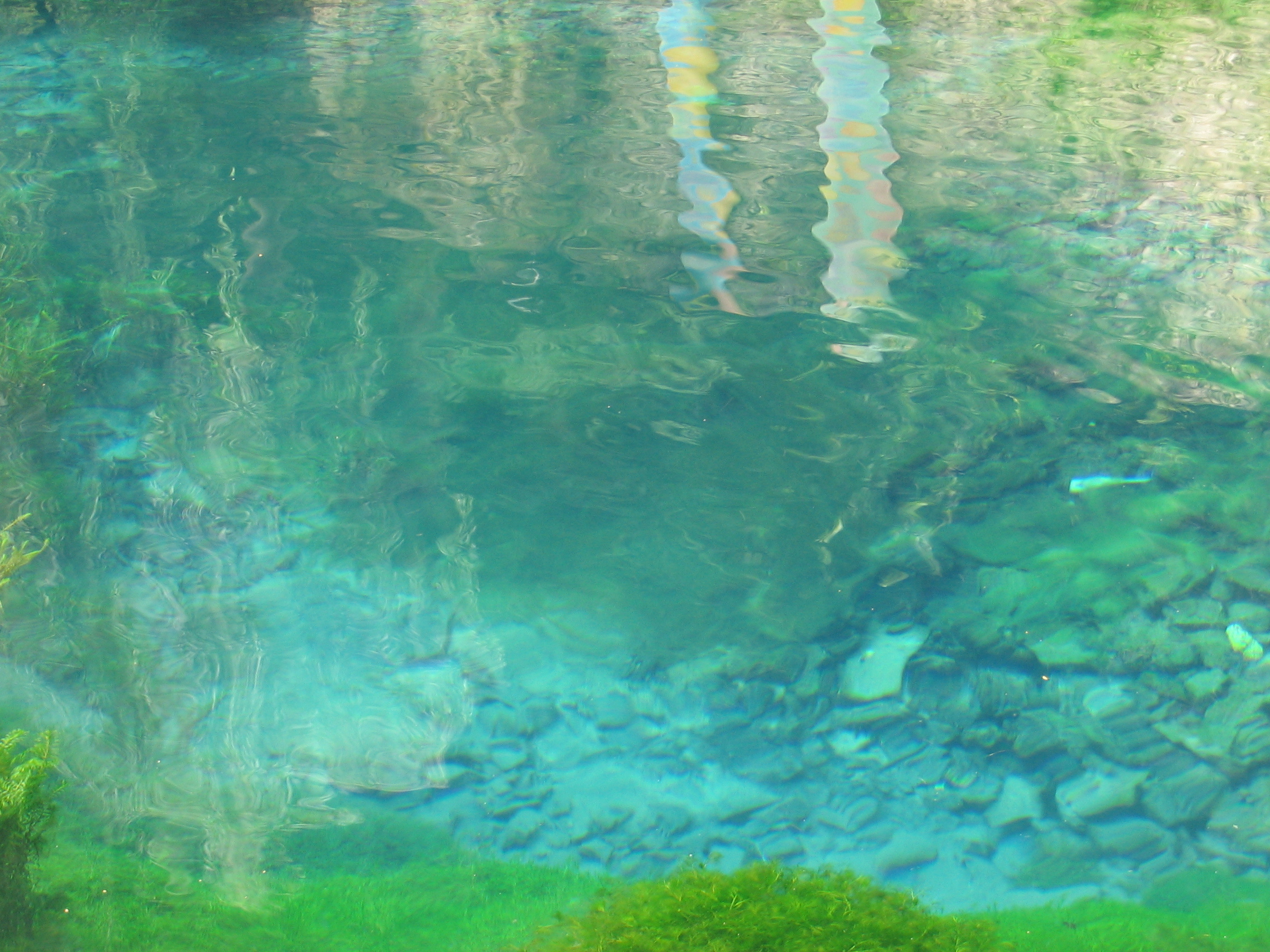
Spring of the small river Urspring

The town centre of Schelklingen is located in the prehistoric valley of the Danube at the feet of the Swabian Alb or Swabian Jura (547 m above NN). The villages of Hausen ob Urspring, Justingen, and Ingstetten are located on the table land of the Swabian Alb. In the Schmiech valley are located the villages of Schmiechen, Hütten, Gundershofen, and Sondernach.

=== Neighbouring municipalities ===
To the north of Schelklingen is the town of Heroldstatt, to the east the town of Blaubeuren, to the south-east the town of Erbach, to the south are Altheim and Allmendingen, and to the west are Mehrstetten and the town of Münsingen, the latter both belonging to the county of Reutlingen.

=== Municipal structure ===
The borough of Schelklingen has the following municipal subdivisions: the villages of Schmiechen, Hausen ob Urspring, Justingen, Ingstetten, Hütten, Gundershofen and Sondernach. Within the borough are the municipalities of Schmiechen, Hausen ob Urspring, Justingen, Ingstetten, Hütten, Gundershofen and Sondernach. Also within the borough are smaller hamlets, individual farms, old corn mills, castles and an old monastery: Muschenwang Farm (Hausen ob Urspring), Oberschelklingen Farm (to Schelklingen), the hamlet of Sotzenhausen (former cement factory, Schelklingen: not to be confused with the hamlet of Sotzenhausen which was incorporated in 1835 into Pappelau, today the town of Blaubeuren), the corn mill hamlet of Springen (Gundershofen), the Riedmühle mill (Sondernach), the hamlet of Talsteußlingen and Neusteußlingen Castle (Hütten), the hamlet of Teuringshofen (Hütten) and the old monastery of Urspring (Schelklingen).

=== Rivers and lakes ===
- The little river of Urspring begins near the former monastery of Urspring and discharges after approximately 500 m into the river Ach.
- The Ach originates near Urspring and empties into the Blau at Blaubeuren.
- The Schmiech has its source in Springen and discharges into the Danube at Ehingen.
- The Sondernach stream originates in the Sondernach valley and empties into the Schmiech near the Riedmühle mill.

=== Landmarks ===
- The Hohle Fels (Hohler Fels, hollow rock) is a huge limestone rock in the Ach valley, its interior almost completely excavated by water. The cave was inhabited at least during the Stone Age. In September 2008, the Venus of Hohle Fels, the earliest known figurine in the world was discovered in the cave. Visits are possible.
- The Schmiechener See or Schmiecher See (d’r Sai) (Lake of Schmiechen) is a remnant from the ice age, and today forms part of a nature reserve.
- The Sirgenstein, like the Hohle Fels a huge limestone rock, but located on the opposite side of the Ach valley. During the Stone Age this cave was inhabited as well. During the Middle Ages a castle was built on the top of the rock. Some remains are still visible.
- The karst springs of the rivers Urspring, Ach (Blau) and Schmiech.

== History ==
=== Middle Ages and early modern times ===
Castro et villae Schälkalingen (castle and village of Schelklingen) were first mentioned in an 1127 deed. The first owners were the Swabian edelfrei Lords of Schelklingen, three brothers: Rüdiger, Adalbert and Walter, who donated property to the newly established Benedictine abbey of Urspring nearby. In the early 13th century, by the way of purchase, marriage or inheritance, the Schelklingen territory was acquired by the Swabian counts of Berg (Grafen von Berg, not to be confused with the Rhenish Berg dynasty). Descending from Berg Castle near Ehingen, Count Henry III (d. 1242), also Margrave of Burgau, appeared as the holder of Schelklingen from 1234 onwards, at the time when for the first time the settlement was called a town (civitas, according to municipal law). His son and heir Ulrich II adopted the title of a Count of Berg-Schelklingen in 1248. In 1343, the last Count of Berg-Schelklingen, Conrad, sold the estates to the Habsburg dukes of Austria and received it back as fief. When he died three years later, the territory of Schelklingen fell to the Austrian dukes as a reverted fief.

Schelklingen was later administered within Further Austria (Vorderösterreich) and remained with the Habsburg monarchy until 1806. The Peace of Pressburg (Frieden von Pressburg) of 1805 brought Schelklingen to the Electorate of Württemberg as reward for the military help given to Napoleon by the Württemberg rulers.

The permanent shortage of money on the side of the Dukes of Austria and the high prestige connected with an own dominion on the side of the landed gentry were the reasons why the territory of Schelklingen (together with Ehingen and Berg) most of the time was mortgaged and given away as a fief. While during the period from 1346 to the end of the 15th century the masters of the mortgage changed fast, the situation became more stable afterwards. Up to 1568 the territories of Ehingen, Schelklingen and Berg were possessed by the following persons respectively families:

- John the Rich of Stadion (Hans der Reiche von Stadion) and his inheritants (from the beginning of the 15th century to 1507)
- Ludwig of Freyberg, residing in Öpfingen (1507–1530)
- Konrad of Boyneburg (or Bemelberg) (1530–1568)

In 1568, the town of Ehingen was able to free herself from a new mortgage, while paying a large sum of money to the Austrian rulers residing in Innsbruck. This way, the direct aristocratic rule ended, and the territories of Ehingen, Schelklingen and Berg in future were administered by Austrian governors, most of the time noblemen. In 1680 the Count of the Empire (Reichsgraf) and bishop of Eichstätt Marquard Schenk von Castell reminded the German Emperor of his merits and services. Thus, thanks to his efforts, the family Schenk von Castell first received the territories of Schelklingen and Berg (without Ehingen) first as a mortgage and finally in 1732 as a personal fief. The feudal rule of this family over Schelklingen and Berg lasted until the middle of the 19th century when the last obligations were abolished. Franz Ludwig Schenk von Castell (1736–1821), a prosecutor of criminals, was the most influential owner of the two territories during the 18th century.

In 1806, Schelklingen was acquired by Württemberg, and the King of Württemberg was busy to end feudal rule in his new Kingdom. Mediatization ended the rule of the Schenk von Castell family in Schelklingen, and the counts step-by-step sold their properties there.

=== 19th and 20th century ===
During the 19th century Schelklingen evolved from a town of artisans and peasants towards an industrial town. In 1806 the monastery of Urspring was secularized. High costs of maintaining the many buildings finally caused Württemberg to sell the former monastery. In 1832 most of the buildings were bought by the cotton manufacturer Georg Reichenbach with the intention to build up a cotton weaving factory. This factory later adopted the name of Mechanical Weaving Factory Urspring (Mechanische Weberei Urspring, MWU). In 1907, the factory was transferred to Schelklingen into a new building along the Ehingerstraße. In Urspring, most of the factory buildings were removed. Caused by international competition from low-wage countries, the MWU in the 1950s got financial problems and was closed.

In Urspring in 1912, after the grain mill (Dreikönigsmühle) at the Ach spring (Achtopf) was changed into the municipal electricity and water factory, a new grain mill was built which is today used as a school building. From 1907 to 1930 the buildings in Urspring were not inhabited except for a tavern. Only in 1930 the former monastery found a new utilization by the foundation of the Urspring School (Urspringschule), a Protestant country boarding school and gymnasium.

A second industry branch which developed during the 1830s, was the production of matches. This innovation was based on the invention of the phosphor match. Three factories were founded employing many women and children in home work. These factories were closed at the beginning of the 20th century.

During the late 19th century in the valleys of the rivers Blau, Ach and Schmiech evolved the cement industry, based on the invention of the Portland cement. In 1889, the first Barbey factory was built, later called Hammerstein cement factory, and shortly after 1900 the large plant of the Stuttgarter Immobilien- und Baugeschäft. The Hammerstein factory was closed and changed into dwellings for cement workers. This new factory attracted many external workers, especially also many Italian migrant workers: some of them remained in Schelklingen. Later, this cement factory was bought by the Portland-Cement-Fabrik AG Heidelberg und Mannheim AG, today HeidelbergCement.

During the 1870s a Catholic institution for boys living in bad social conditions (Katholische Rettungsanstalt für Knaben) was founded, the St.-Konradihaus. During World War II the town was a place of internment for POWs from Poland. In 1941 the St.-Konradihaus was requisitioned by the government and until 1945 was used as a resettlement camp (Umsiedlungslager (SS-Lager)) in order to reeducate people from Alsace.

After the end of the World War II, Schelklingen was being part of the French occupation zone and in 1947, it was assigned to the newly founded state of Württemberg-Hohenzollern, which was incorporated in the state of Baden-Württemberg in 1952.

=== Territorial development of the town ===
According to the administrative reorganization of the municipalities (Gemeindegebietsreform in Baden-Württemberg) the following communes have been incorporated into (or merged with) the town of Schelklingen:

- 1 March 1972: Hausen ob Urspring and Justingen
- 1 April 1972: Ingstetten and Hütten
- 1 July 1974: Schmiechen (unification with Schelklingen forming the new borough of Schelklingen)
- 1 January 1975: Gundershofen and Sondernach

Before the district reform, Schelklingen, Hausen ob Urspring and Schmiechen belonged to the district of Ehingen, the other municipalities to the district of Münsingen. During the Baden-Württemberg district reform in 1973, all of Schelklingen's towns came to the Alb-Donau district.

=== Religions ===
Schelklingen is predominantly Catholic. The territory of the former dominion of Schelklingen (Herrschaft Schelklingen), consisting of the town of Schelklingen, Hausen ob Urspring and Schmiechen and the territory of the former Urspring monastery until 1806 belonged to Further Austria (Vorderösterreich). During the 16th century until the end of the 30 Years War, the villages of the former territory of Justingen (Reichsherrschaft Justingen, Justingen, Ingstetten, Gundershofen and Hütten) adhered to the belief of Caspar Schwenckfeld, promoted by the lords of Freyberg (Freiherren von Freyberg). When the territory of Justingen was newly acquired again by the prince bishop (Fürstbischof) of Augsburg Johann Christoph von Freyberg (1665–1690), Catholicism was reintroduced. The village of Sondernach was part of the territory of Neusteußlingen; under the rule of the lords of Freyberg residing in the castle Neusteußlingen (not identical with the former, but related) it was Catholic. When this territory went back to the Dukes of Württemberg in the late 16th century, the Reformation was introduced there.

In Schelklingen at the moment exist each one Roman Catholic (Römisch-Katholische Kirche), Lutheran Protestant (Evangelische Kirche) and New-Apostolic (Neuapostolische Kirche) community. In addition, Muslim inhabitants (primarily Sunni) live in Schelklingen. The Islamic citizens came to Schelklingen since the early 1960s by the way of labour migration, mainly from the Republic of Turkey. Some years ago, the Muslim inhabitants built a small mosque (Gebetsstätte) at the outskirts of the town.

== Politics ==
=== Mayors ===
During Austrian times the town was administered by the governing official mayor (regierender Amtsbürgermeister) and his predecessor, the lower mayor (Unterbürgermeister). These were supported by an internal and external council (innerer und äußerer Rat) with four members each, called councilors or deputies (Ratsherren, Deputierte). The town offices like town, church, and hospital accountancy, etc. (Stadtrechner, Kirchenpfleger, Spitalpfleger) were distributed among the councilors. The mayors were elected for one year, but reelections were possible, proved by the mayors' partly long years in office. After 1806 Württemberg introduced the position of the Schultheiß, elected for life. Later for towns the title Stadtschultheiß was introduced. In 1930 in Württemberg the title Bürgermeister (mayor) was adopted which is used until the present day. The mayor is currently elected for a term of eight years.

- Haintz Pfortzer 1433
- Ulrich Gyger 1446
- Hans Seiner 1481

...

- Hans Minderer 1560

...

- Franz Bischof 1800
- Franz Joseph Eberle 1800–1823
- Johann Nikolaus Heyschmid 1823–1825
- Johann Baptist Bauer 1826–1835
- Georg Martin Betz 1836–1847
- Philipp Scheitenberger 1847–1873
- Anton Fischer, from Justingen 1873–1906
- Anton Fischer 1906–1946, son of the former
- Karl Oßwald 1946–1960
- Hans-Joachim Baeuchle (SPD) 1961–1974
- Rudolf Stützle (CDU) 1975–2000
- Michael Knapp (without party affiliation) 2000–2016
- since 2016: Ulrich Ruckh
- First deputy mayor: Jürgen Haas
- Second deputy mayor: Reiner Blumentritt

=== Municipal council ===
As of the municipal election of 2009, the following was the distribution of seats on the town council:

- Christian Democratic Union (Christlich Demokratische Union (CDU)): 31.6% (-26.8), 9 seats (−5)
- Free Voters (Freie Wähler (FW)): 18.0% (-6.4), 5 seats (+0)
- Social Democratic Party of Germany (Sozialdemokratische Partei (SPD)): 19.0% (+1.8), 5 seats (+1)
- Pro Schelklingen e.V.: 38.4% (+38.4), 8 seats (+8)

=== Coat of arms ===
The coat of arms of Schelklingen is the coat of arms of the former Counts of Berg-Schelklingen except that the red and white strips are organized in the opposite way. They are not running from left to right (coat of arms of Ehingen), but from the right upper side to the lower left side. The municipal colours are white and red.

Coat of arms of the parts of the municipality
Gundershofen	Hausen ob Urspring	Hütten	Ingstetten	Justingen	Schmiechen	Sondernach

== Economy and infrastructure ==
=== Traffic ===
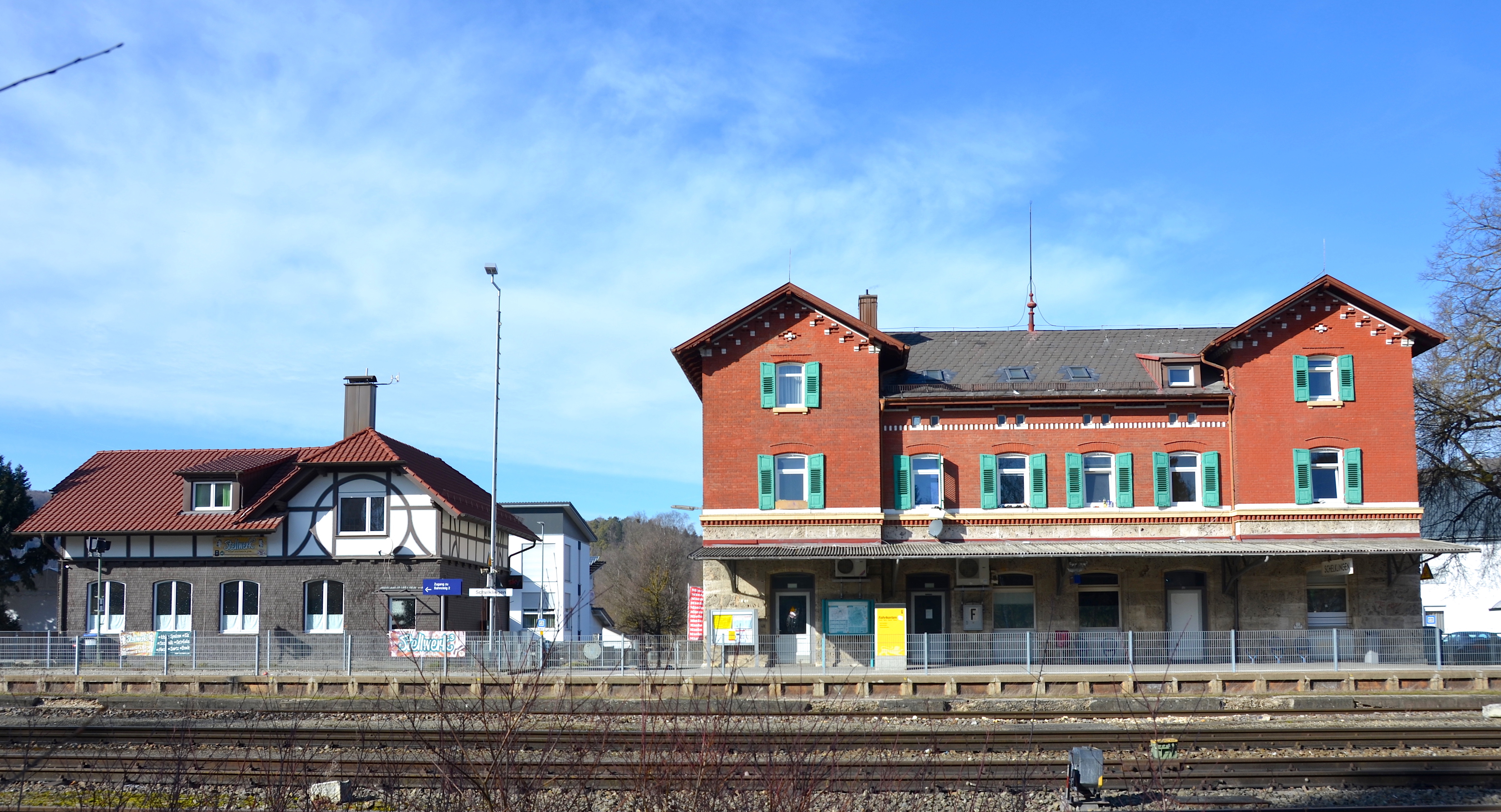
Railway station Schelklingen

Schelklingen is a small regional railway junction. At this place the Ulm–Sigmaringen railway meets the Swabian Alb Railway which comes from Kleinengstingen over Münsingen to Schelklingen. While traffic on the Swabian Alb Railway is quite low, departures and arrivals are frequent on the Ulm–Sigmaringen railway. Schelklingen is a stop for both Regional-Express and Regionalbahn (stopping) trains. Therefore, at least two trains per hour leave for Ulm. In the opposite direction for Sigmaringen, a train leaves every hour; and trains leave every two hours for the much more remote town of Titisee-Neustadt. Every hour, via Ulm station, regional trains leave for Memmingen. Schelklingen is a member of the Donau-Iller regional transport association Donau-Iller-Nahverkehrsverbund.

Schelklingen is connected to the supraregional road network via Federal Road 492 (Bundesstraße 492) (Blaubeuren–Ehingen). Schelklingen has access to the Federal motorway system via the Federal Motorway A 8 (A 8) – exit Merklingen respectively Federal Motorway A 7 (A 7) – exit Ulm/Langenau.

=== Local enterprises ===
Larger plants of the HeidelbergCement AG and Cooper Standard Automotive are located in the town.

=== Education ===
Schelklingen has an elementary school (Grundschule), an extended elementary school (Hauptschule) with a practical secondary school (Werkrealschule), all included in the Heinrich-Kaim-school, as well as four additional elementary schools in the parts of the town, all supervised by the municipality.

In addition, the Urspring School (Urspringschule) offers high school studies (Gymnasium) accompanied by a boarding school, under the supervision of the Protestant Church. In addition to the Abitur, practical studies can be finished as well.

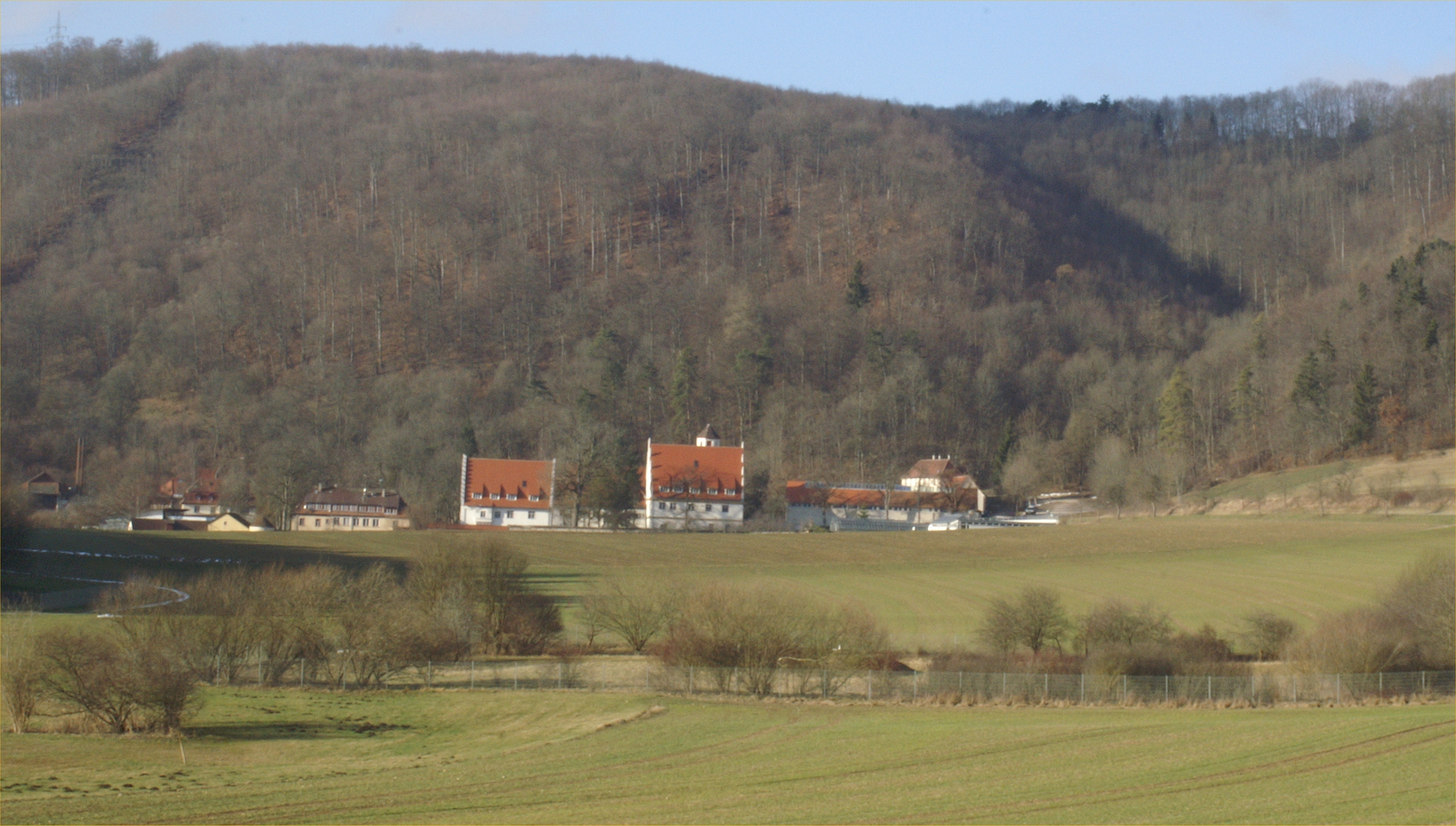
View of the Urspring School

The St. Konradihaus is an institution for youth assistance with a boarding school, where young people from the age of 12 years onwards may obtain general schooling and occupational education.

Furthermore, four Roman Catholic, two municipal and one Protestant kindergarten exist in the town.

== Culture and things to see ==
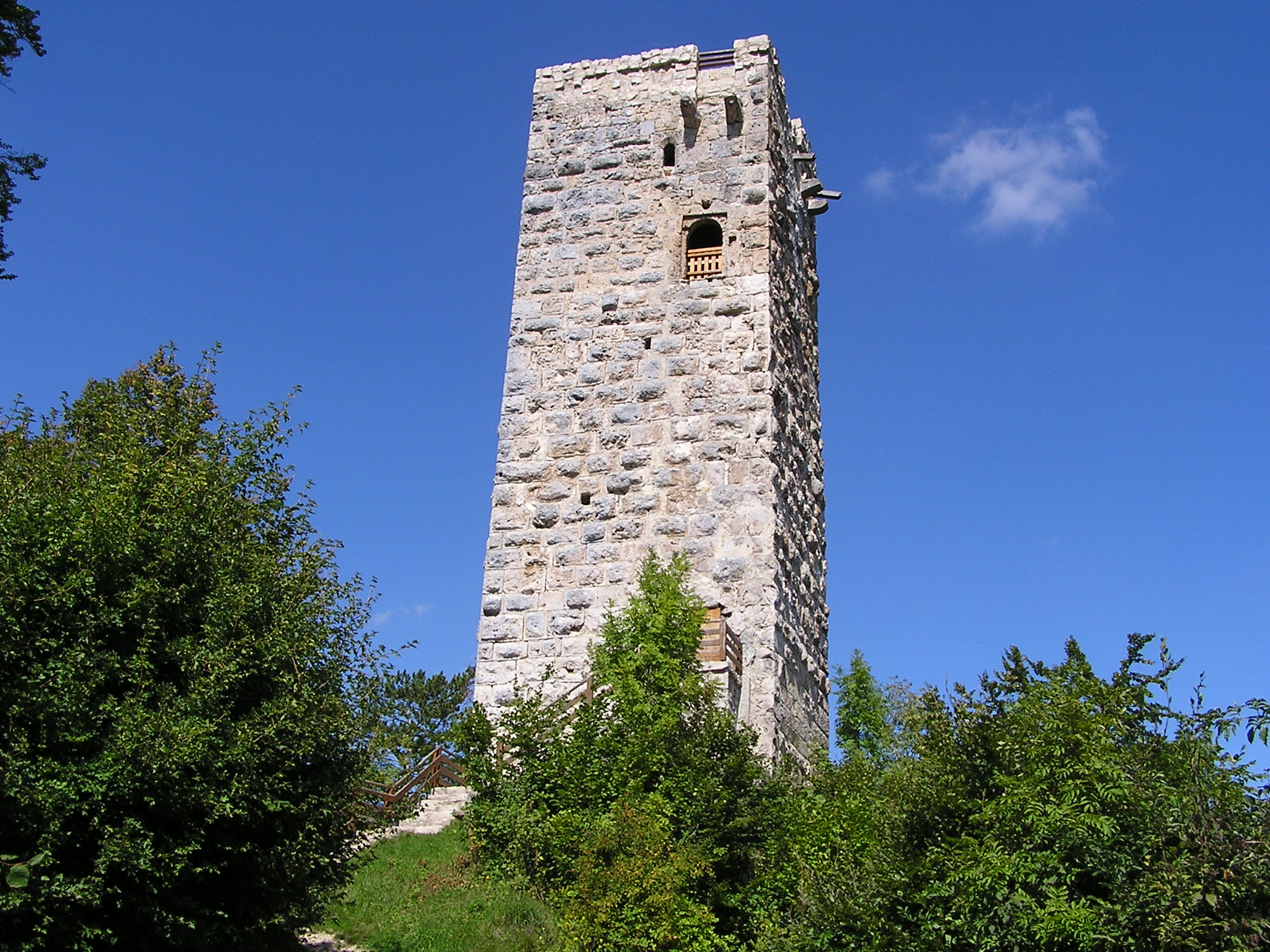
Tower of the Hohenschelklingen castle

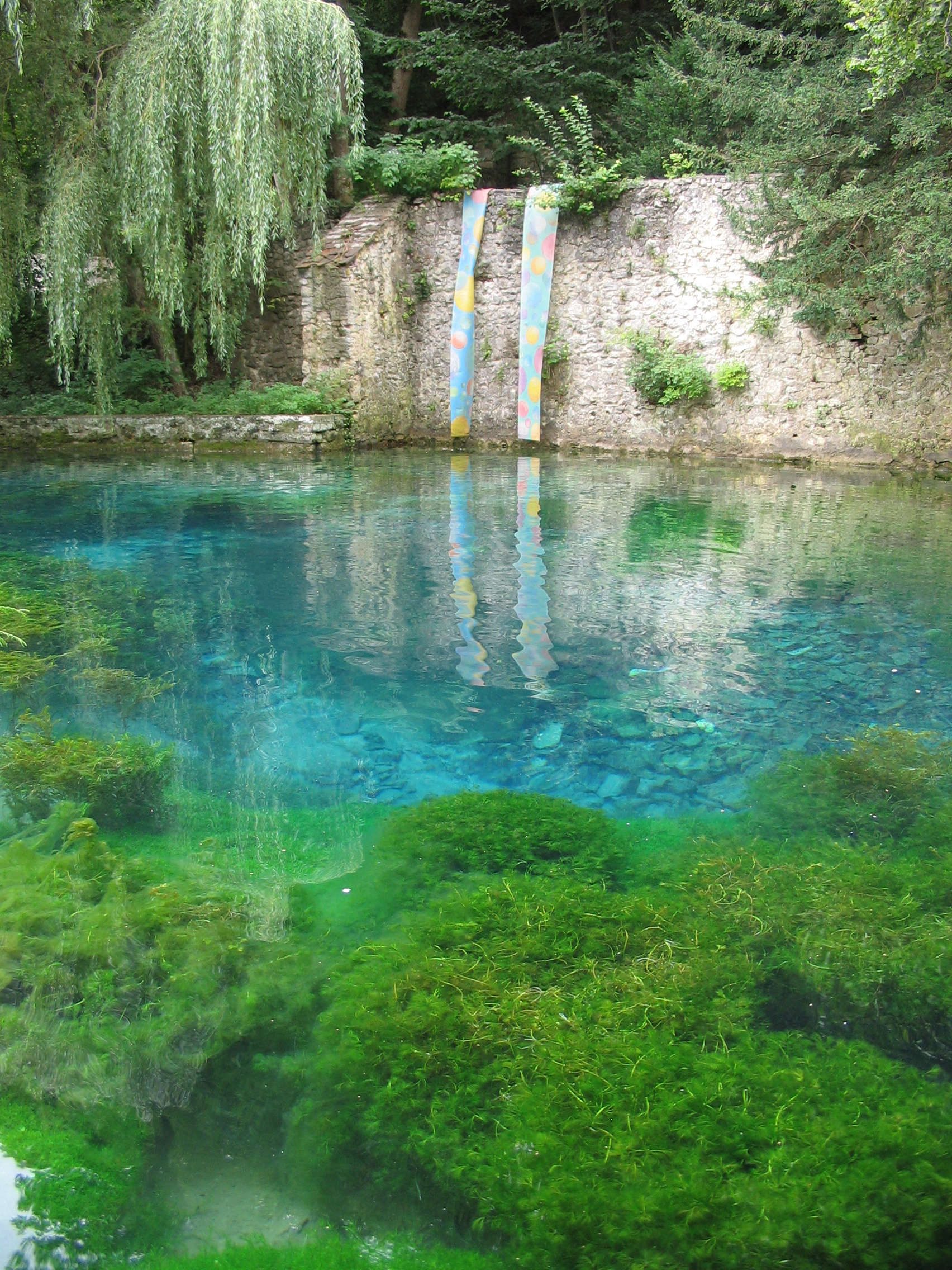
The spring of the river Urspring in the former monastery of Urspring

=== Library ===
The municipal public library is located in the Old Townhall. Its holdings are stored in an online library catalogue.

=== Theatres ===
A theatre club exists, presenting popular performances. There is no theatre in the strict sense of the word any more.

=== Museums ===
- Municipal museum in the former Hospital of the Holy Spirit (Spital zum Heiligen Geist)

=== Orchestras and clubs ===
- Musikverein Stadtkapelle Schelklingen
- Musikverein Schmiechen
- Brassband
- TSV Schelklingen
- Liederkranz Schelklingen
- DLRG
- Förderverein Freibad Schelklingen

=== Buildings ===
==== Castles and manor houses ====
- Within the borough are the ruins of several castles: Hohenschelklingen, Muschenwang, Sirgenstein and Studach. Furthermore, there are remains of the palaces of Hohenjustingen and of the medieval castle Neusteußlingen. In 1897 the Neusteußlingen castle was rebuilt in historicist style by the newspaper publisher and economic historian Eugen Nübling from Ulm.

==== Religious buildings ====
- The Benedictine monastery of Urspring was founded in 1127. Some buildings date from approximately 1500 (two buildings for visitors and the east branch of the enclosure), otherwise mostly 17th century.
- The Sacred Heart of Jesus parish church (German: Herz-Jesu-Kirche) was newly built in 1934. The former sacristy from the late Gothic period, today used as a sidechapel, and the church tower, in its lower parts stemming from Romanesque times with hump square stones, were preserved. The upper part of the church tower and the onion tower were built by Joseph Cades in 1905.

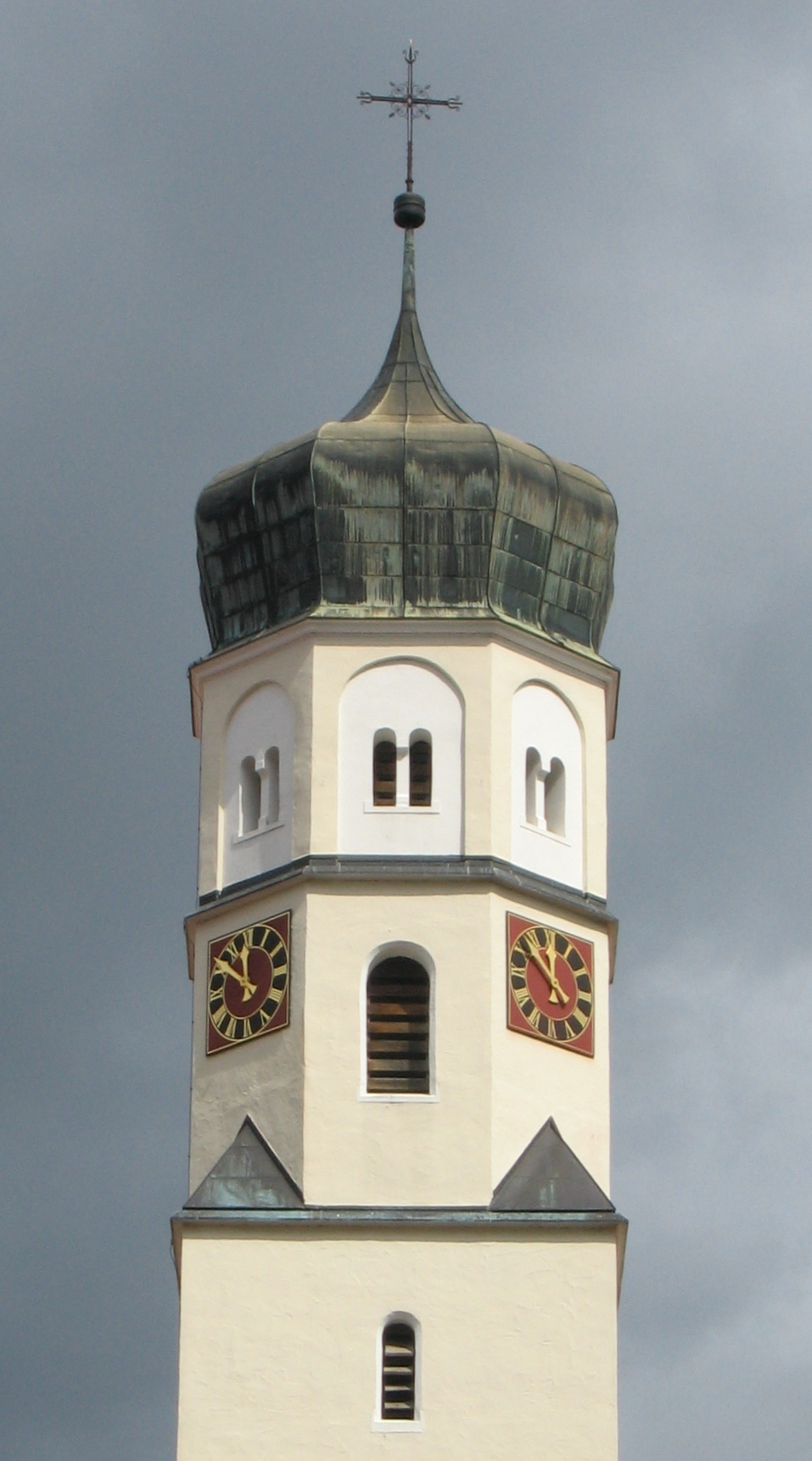
Bell tower of the parish church of the Sacred Heart of Jesus (Herz-Jesu)

- St. Afra-Chapel (built in the 14th century).
- Herz-Jesu-Chapel (built in 1708–9).

==== Parish and curate houses ====
- The old clergyman's house, an impressive timber framing, approximately built in 1600.
- The new clergyman's house, originally a curate house, donated by the of Westernach noble family for the family altar in the Urspring monastery, later used as municipal chancellery (newly built in 1599).
- The curate house of the of Wernau noble family in the Kanzleigasse: a baroque building in the French style of that time, approximately built in 1750.
- The curate house of the Roth von Bußmannshausen noble family in the Stadtschreibereigasse: baroque building from approximately 1750, today strongly modified.

==== Houses of the nobility ====
- Hospital of the Holy Spirit (Spital zum Heiligen Geist), former residence of the lords of Wernau (built in the 14th century) with the former hospital well.
- Bemelberg Castle, residence of Conrad of Boyneburg (or Bemelberg) (built approximately in 1550).
- Tavern of the Small Horse (Gasthaus zum Rößle), former residence of the nobleman Hans Reuß of Reussenstein (built in the second half of the 16th century).
- Stauffenberg Castle, residence of the family of the Schenk of Stauffenberg (built approximately 1600).
- The Rennhof, residence of the noble family of the Renner of Allmendingen (built in the second half of the 16th century).

==== Municipal buildings ====
- The old town hall, in the centre of the Market Street, approximately built in 1450.
- The town walls: original parts have survived in the external walls of houses. The town wall is preserved up to its full height near the Bemelberg castle. Part of the town wall was rebuilt near the Hospital of the Holy Spirit
- The back well (Hinterer Brunnen): public well.

==== Houses of citizens ====
- House of a citizen with a beautifully restored framework at the Maximilian-Kottmann-Platz (with an unidentified inscription at the south-eastern beam "R.C.I.R. 1544").
- House of a citizen-peasant (Ackerbürger) near the former back gate (Hinteres Tor), attached to the town wall, in the Stadtschreibereigasse, with restored framework (dated 1705).
- The so-called New House (Neues Haus), a baroque building of Franz Xaver Schalch, a steward of the Urspring monastery (built in 1717).
- Tavern of the Sun (Gasthaus zur Sonne), formerly called Gasthaus zur Güldenen Sonne, the oldest tavern and hotel (strongly rebuilt or newly built in 1724).

=== Sport ===
- Public outdoor swimming pool
- Skate board pipe
- Soccer place and sporting facilities in the Längental

=== Regular festivals ===
- Parade of Swabian-Alemannic Fastnacht groups
- St. Nicolas market on the first Saturday of each December
- Peasant and street market each Wednesday a.m.

=== Culinaric specialties ===
Typical Swabian dishes (like Spätzle, Maultaschen, Saure Kutteln, Sauerbraten, etc.) are served by different restaurants and taverns.

== Personalities ==
=== Honorary citizens ===
Schelklingen has awarded the rights of honorary citizenship to the following persons:

- 23 June 1879: Robert Rall (1841–1935), manufacturer of cotton cloth
- 9 March 1923: Heinrich Günter (1870–1951), professor of medieval history
- 22 November 1946: Max Kottmann (1867–1948), prelate and general curate
- 11 April 1956: Anton Fischer (1876–1956), mayor
- 2000: Rudolf Stützle, mayor
- Year?: Erich Karl (1924–), manager and local politician

=== Sons and daughters of the town ===
The following list contains important personalities, born in Schelklingen, arranged by year of birth. Persons are included in this list irrelevant of the fact if they lived and worked in Schelklingen later in their life or not.

- Christoph von Stadion (* Schelklingen 1478, † Nürnberg 15 April 1543): Dr. iur., bishop of Augsburg 1517–1543
- Johannes Bumüller (* Schelklingen 29 December 1811, † Ravensburg 13 September 1890): Dr. phil., professor at a "Gymnasium", editor and Catholic writer
- Ludwig Lutz (*Schelklingen 27 August 1820, † Ellwangen/Jagst 1889): tinsmith master, manufacturer of tin toys in Ellwangen/Jagst; precursor of the Märklin toy factory
- Franz Sales Günter (*Schelklingen 9 November 1830, † Oberndorf am Neckar 1 September 1901): since 1855 administrative official (Verwaltungsaktuar) of the district (Oberamt) of Oberndorf a.N., mayor (Stadtschultheiß) of Oberndorf a.N. from 1870 to 1899; he was granted the golden medal for civil merits (Goldene Zivilverdienstmedaille), the silver jubilee medal (Silberne Jubiläumsmedaille) by the King of Württemberg and the Order of Osmanieh 4th class by the Turkish sultan
- Sebastian Luz (*Schelklingen 7 March 1836, † Freiburg/Breisgau 2 May 1898): painter of religious topics, historical motifs, portraits and landscapes
- Maximilian Kottmann (* Sotzenhausen near Schelklingen 16 June 1867, † Rottenburg am Neckar 22 March 1948): Dr. phil., Dr. theol. h.c., general curate of the diocese of Rottenburg, honorary senator of the University of Tübingen, 1946 honorary citizen of Schelklingen and honorary citizen of Rottenburg am Neckar
- Heinrich Günter (* Schelklingen 15 February 1870, † Munich 13 Mai 1951): Dr. phil., Dr. theol. h.c., professor of history at the Universities of Tübingen and München, 1923 honorary citizen of Schelklingen
- Heribert Jone (* Schelklingen 30 January 1885, † Stühlingen/Baden 25 December 1967): Dr. iur. can., Catholic priest, professor of canon law and moral theologist

=== Other important personalities ===
In this place well-known personalities are listed which in Schelklingen have spent parts of their life or have died there.

- Johann Georg Wolcker the Older (* Burgau?, ∞ 1700 or earlier, † Augsburg?): baroque painter in Schelklingen
- Friedrich List (* at the latest 6 August 1789 in Reutlingen; † 30 November 1846 in Kufstein, Austria): 1809-1810 tax renovator of the Kingdom of Württemberg in Schelklingen, author of the Schelklingen tax register of 1810 (2 volumes)
- Johann Georg Friedrich Reichenbach (* Montbéliard, France 22 Juni 1791 as son of the medical doctor (Kammerchirurgus) Wilhelm Heinrich Reichenbach, † Stuttgart 1873): founder and owner of the cotton weaving factory Urspring from 1832 to 1852, politician of the 1830s and 1840s (Vormärz)
- Robert Rall (* Eningen under Achalm 3 Juni 1841, † Ulm/Donau 2 März 1935): owner and director of the Mechanical Weaving Factory (Mechanische Weberei Urspring, MWU) from 1870 to 1930; on 23 June 1879 honorary citizen of Schelklingen with the argument "that he treated his factory workers much better, more respectful and more just than it was usually the case"
- Otto Merz (* Esslingen am Neckar 12 June 1889, † Berlin 18 May 1933): chauffeur, race car driver, test driver and mechanic (Mercedes)
- Franz Beyer (* Weingarten 26 February 1922 as son of Otto Paul Beyer, music director in Weingarten (* 12 September 1885, † Weingarten 22 November 1973) and of Anna Günter (* Schelklingen 16 July 1895, † Weingarten 7 January 1992)): retired professor for music at the University for Music and Theatre Munich (Hochschule für Musik und Theater München); spent the years of his youth in Schelklingen with his relatives there
- Erich Karl (* Ulm 1924), manager and local politician
- Marie-Louise Roth-Zimmermann (* Haguenau, Alsace 1 August 1926), literary scholar
