= Urspring (Ach) =

River in Germany

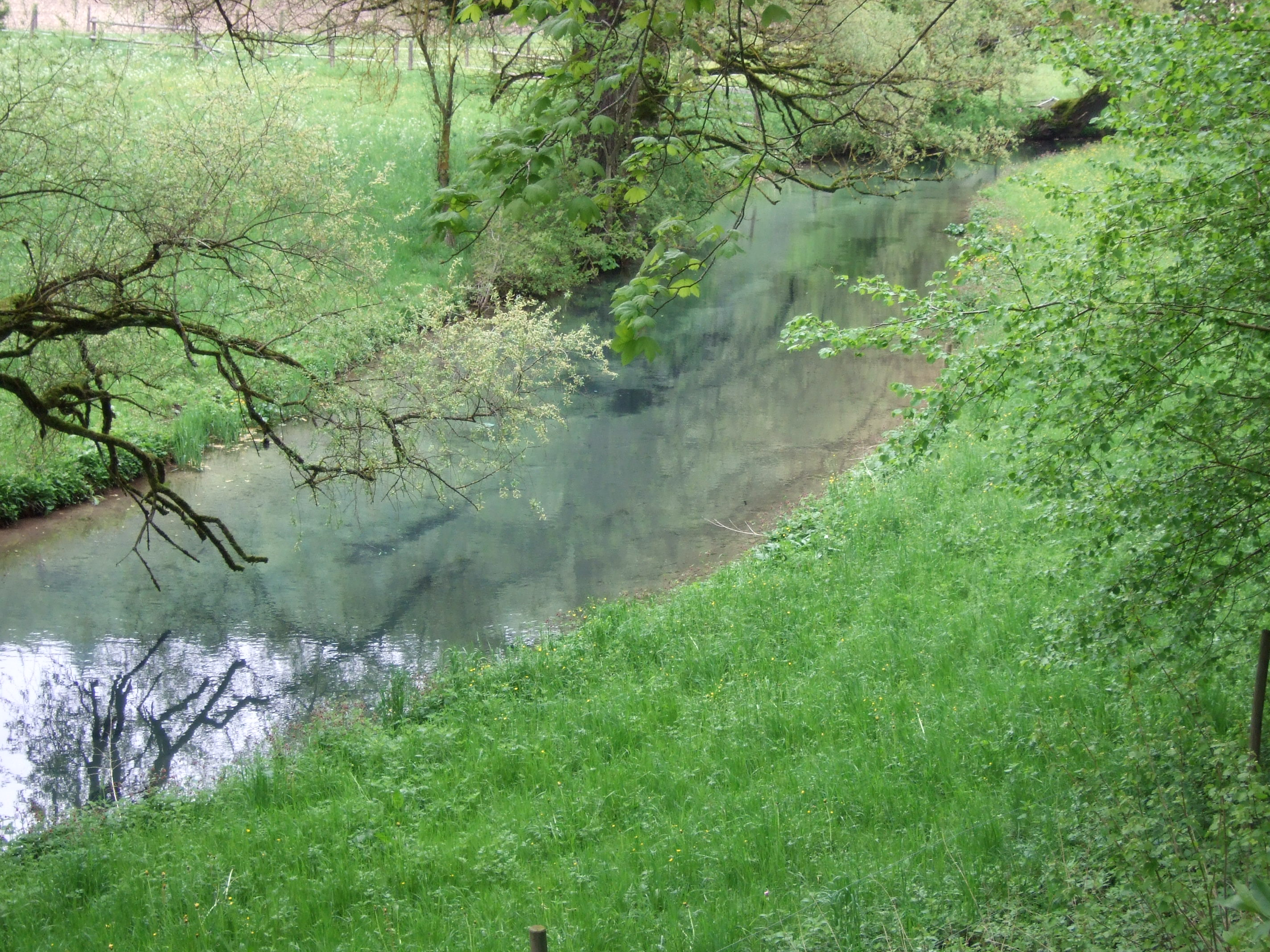

Location
- Country: Germany
- State: Baden-Württemberg

Physical characteristics
- Mouth
  - location: Ach
  - coordinates: 48.3764°N 9.7179°E

Basin features
- Progression: Ach→ Blau→ Danube→ Black Sea

Urspring is a short river of Baden-Württemberg, Germany. It is a left tributary of the Ach near Schelklingen.

== See also ==
- List of rivers of Baden-Württemberg
