= Brillenhöhle =

Cave and archaeological site in Germany

- Brillenhöhle (German)
- (formerly) Zwickerhöhle
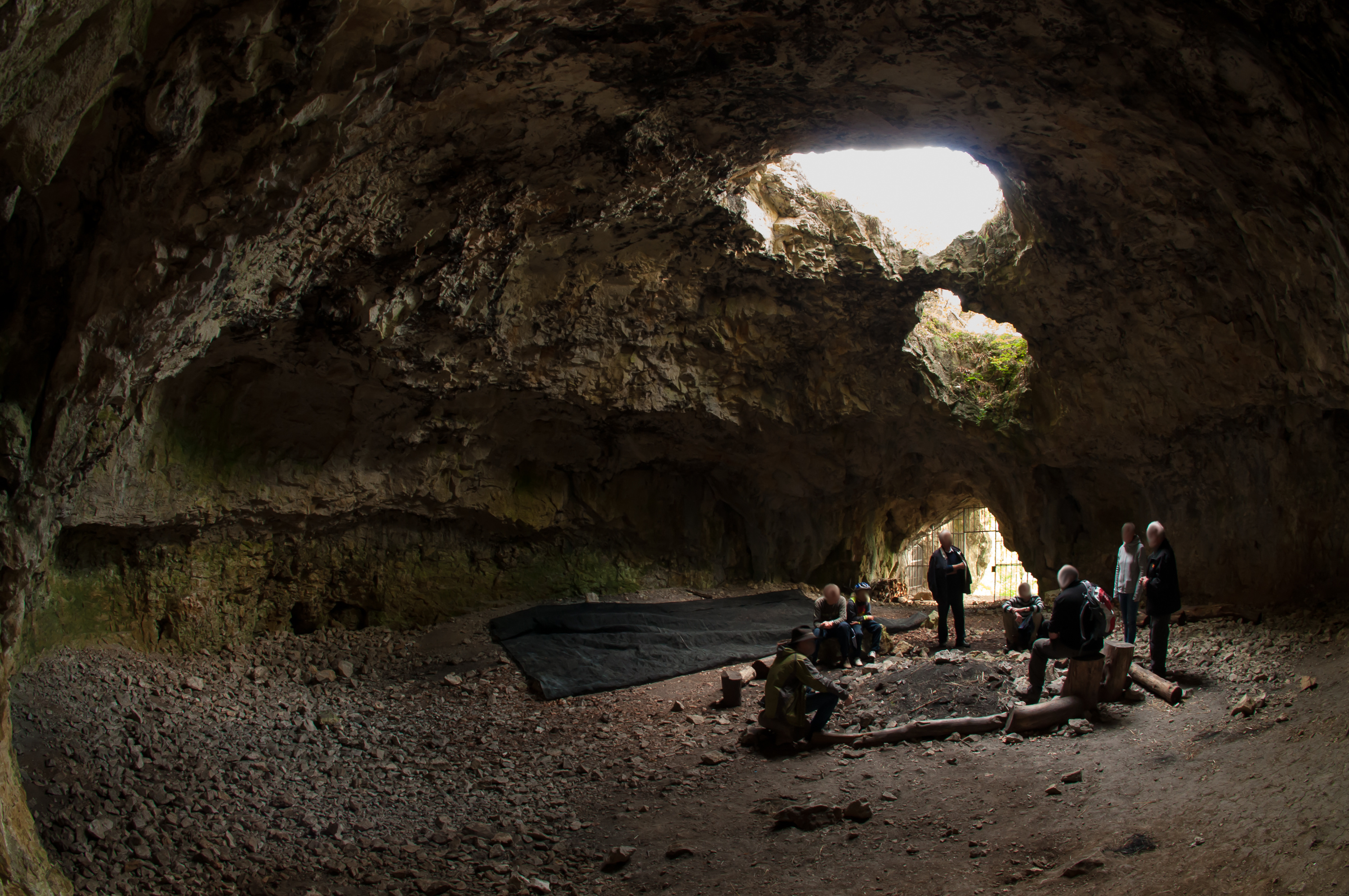
- interior of Brillenhöhle

- Location in Germany Brillenhöhle (Germany)
- 48°24′20″N 9°46′40″E
- Type: Jurassic limestone
- Periods: Upper Palaeolithic
- Cultures: Aurignacian, Gravettian, Magdalenian
- Location: near Blaubeuren
- Region: Ach Valley, Swabian Jura, Baden-Württemberg, Germany

Site notes
- Material: limestone Karst
- Length: 23 m (75.46 ft)
- Excavation dates: 1906, 1911, 1951, 1955, 1963
- Archaeologists: Robert Rudolf Schmidt, Peter Goessler, Albert Kley, Gustav Riek
- Condition: advanced decay, ruin

The Brillenhöhle (German: Brillenhöhle, literally spectacles cave) is a cave ruin, located 16 km (9.94 mi) west of Ulm on the Swabian Alb in south-western Germany, where archaeological excavations have documented human habitation since as early as 30,000 years ago. Excavated by Gustav Riek from 1955 to 1963, the cave's Upper Paleolithic layers contain a sequence of Aurignacian, Gravettian and Magdalenian artifacts. In 1956 the first human fossils were discovered within a fireplace in the center of the cave, a discovery which made important contributions to the foundational understanding of the Magdalenian culture of central Europe.

== Site ==
Brillenhöhle is located in the Ach Valley, lying about 80 m (262.47 ft) above the Ach River below. The site derives its name from the two holes in the cave's ceiling, which together resemble a pair of spectacles. The cave is essentially a single room with a diameter of 17 m (55.77 ft), an average height of 4.50 m (14.76 ft) and a length of 23 m (75.46 ft). A small side cave of 2.50 m (8.20 ft) width and 6 m (19.69 ft) height, called Vespershöhle runs from the entrance around 5 m (16.40 ft) towards the east. As the site is in an advanced state of decay, it has been designated a cave ruin. However, the openings in the roof allow smoke to escape and sufficient light to enter, while still being small enough to keep the cave mostly dry during periods of rainfall. Recurrent prehistoric human occupation at the site indicates that conditions at the cave were tolerable enough to provide reasonable protection from the elements. In the north-western corner, a chimney-like shape tapers towards a 17 cm (6.69 in) wide gap in the ceiling, a gap which allowed a large quantity of reddish-brown clay to ooze into the cave's interior during the Pleistocene.

== Stratigraphy ==
Explorations by discoverer Robert Rudolf Schmidt and historians Peter Goessler and Albert Kley did not yield notable results. Tübingen historian Gustav Riek eventually took up systematic work in September 1955. Over the course of eleven excavation sessions that lasted until October 1963, he unearthed eleven sediment profiles. Riek recognized and determined a total of 22 distinct layers, of which only 3 were considered post-Pleistocene in origin. The work yielded numerous stone and bone tools, ivory jewelry, human skeletal remains and pottery shards.

During the early 1990s, Tübingen archaeologist Anne Scheer succeeded in conclusively demonstrating that the occupations of Brillenhöhle, Hohle Fels and Geissenklösterle during the Gravettian were interrelated and contemporaneous in nature, by refitting stone artifacts found in the three site's Gravettian sediment horizons.

== Discoveries ==
It is assumed that the cave was not frequently inhabited by humans during the Aurignacian since only two broken bone tools were found in layer XIV.

Gravettian finds originate in layer VII. In addition to 52 tools made of animal bones, reindeer antler and mammoth ivory, more than 1000 stone tools were unearthed, including blades, gouges and scrapers. More than 80 artifacts were identified as jewelry, including numerous ivory beads, beaded bones, perforated animal teeth and notched bone rods.

Most discoveries were made in the Magdalenian strata, coming primarily from layers VI to IV. Stone tools, fireplaces, smashed bones and more than 1100 stone tools were found. Notable artifacts include harpoons of ivory or reindeer antler with barbed hooks on one or both sides. Animal bones include mammoth, wild horse, reindeer and cave bear. Smashed human skull fragments with traces of exposure to fire were repeatedly regarded as evidence of cannibalism, but according to Gustav Riek, the lack of powdered ochre is evidence that excludes head burials. Nevertheless, the theory of cannibalism has not entirely been repudiated. The skeletal remains of the central fireplace in the Magdalenian-layer IV had been arranged in deliberate burial fashion.

Neolithic and Bronze Age: In the heavily mixed upper layers II and I, Neolithic as well as Early and Late Bronze Age ceramic vascular and wall shards were found.

Some layers were permanently destroyed during the various excavations. Nonetheless, the cave still holds potential value for future archaeologists, since some areas formerly deemed "unproductive" have still remained untouched. In order to preserve these undocumented areas, the cave was protected by an armored, latticed gate, to prevent access but enable inspection.

== Gallery ==
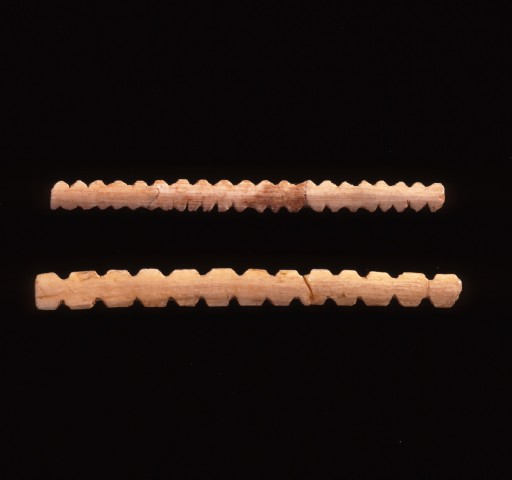
Carved ivory, Aurignacian culture

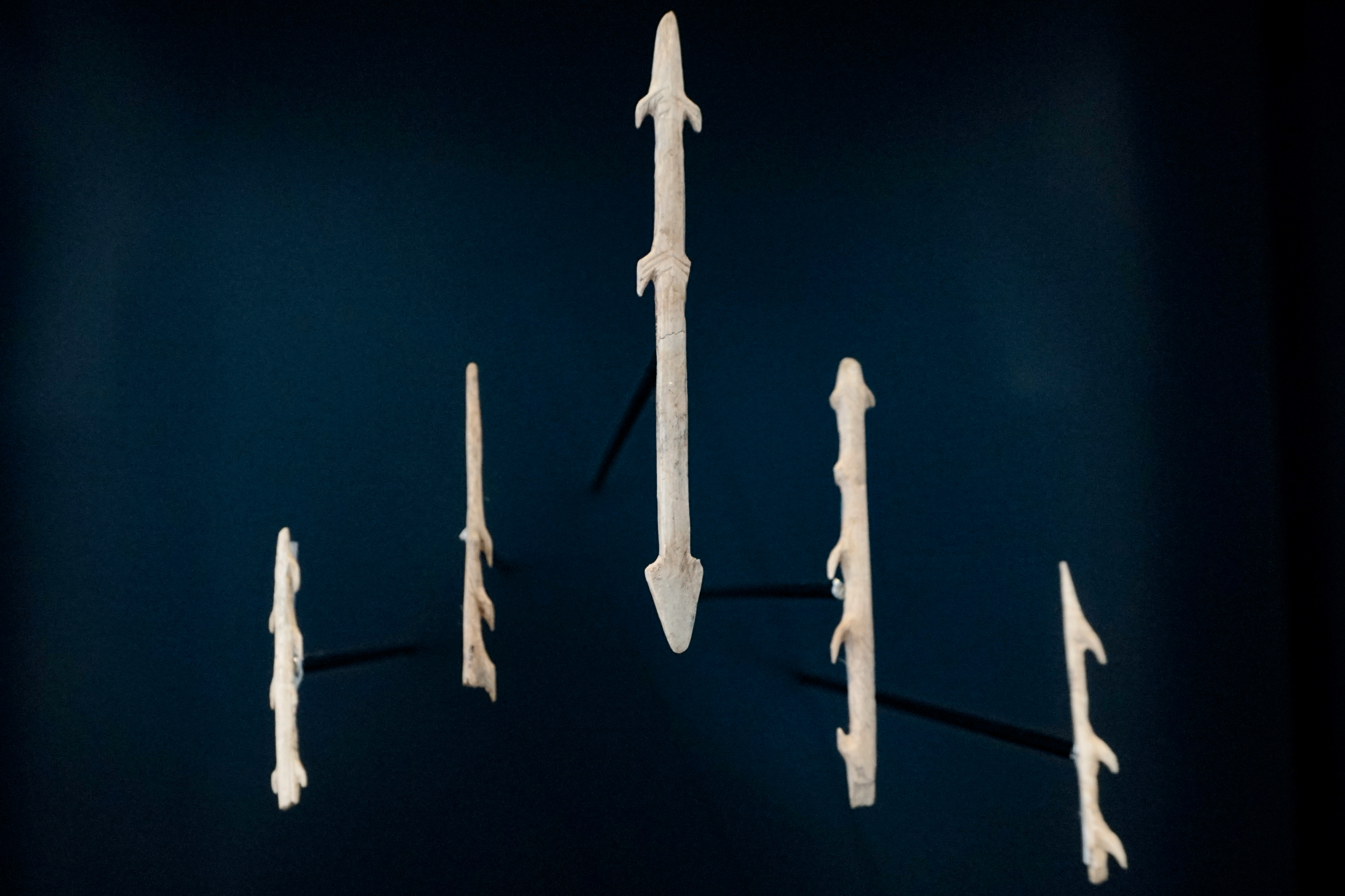
Harpoons made from reindeer antler, Gravettian culture, c. 16,000-12,000 years ago, Landesmuseum Württemberg

== Carbon dated fossils ==
Lab number	Material	Normalized Age	Locality
KIA-19551	Collagen bone tip with massive base	32470 ± 270	local
KIA-19950	Bone tip (cleaved base)	32110 ± 480	local
KIA-19550	Collagen bone tip (cleaved base)	30400 ± 240	local
B-491	charred bone	29000 ± 0	local
KIA-19549	(Mammoth)/Rhino rib	27030 ± 180	local
KIA-19553	(Mammoth)/rhino rib point	25870 ± 230	local
B-492	charred bone	25000 ± 0	local
OxA-23414	bone (Homo sapiens skull fragments)	12535 ± 50	local

== Archaeogenetics ==
The remains of at least four distinct individuals, all associated with the Magdalenian, were discovered at Brillenhöhle. In 2016, researchers successfully extracted the DNA from the parietal bone of one of the individuals. The bone fragment was directly dated to around 15,120-14,440 BP. The individual in question was found to belong to mtDNA Haplogroup U8a. The Brillenhöhle individual was found to be genetically closest to other ancient samples from the Magdalenian, showing closest genetic affinity for other samples taken from the Swabian Jura, such as Hohle Fels, while also showing genetic affinity for another Magdalenian sample, taken from the Red Lady of El Mirón, as well as a sample from the Aurignacian, GoyetQ116-1, taken from Goyet Caves.

== See also ==
- Geissenklösterle
- Sirgenstein Cave

== Bibliography ==
- Nicholas J. Conard, Michael Bolus, Ewa Dutkiewicz, Sibylle Wolf: Eiszeitarchäologie auf der Schwäbischen Alb Kerns Verlag, Tübingen 2015, ISBN 978-3-935751-24-7, S. 153–156.
- Luc Moreau: Geißenklösterle. Das Gravettien der Schwäbischen Alb im europäischen Kontext. Kerns Verlag, Tübingen 2009, ISBN 978-3-935751-11-7, Kapitel 3: Das Gravettien der Brillenhöhle S. 135-176.
- Hans Binder, Herbert Jantschke: Höhlenführer Schwäbische Alb. DRW-Verlag, Leinfelden-Echterdingen 2003, ISBN 3-87181-485-7, S. 143.
- Gustav Riek: Das Paläolithikum der Brillenhöhle bei Blaubeuren (Schwäbische Alb), Teil I. Verlag Müller & Gräff, Stuttgart 1973. ISBN 3-87532-055-7.
- Gustav Riek: Das Paläolithikum der Brillenhöhle bei Blaubeuren (Schwäbische Alb), Teil II, Die jungpleistozänen Tierknochenfunde aus der Brillenhöhle Verlag Müller & Gräff, Stuttgart 1973. ISBN 3-87532-056-5.
