= Hohle Fels =

Cave in Germany

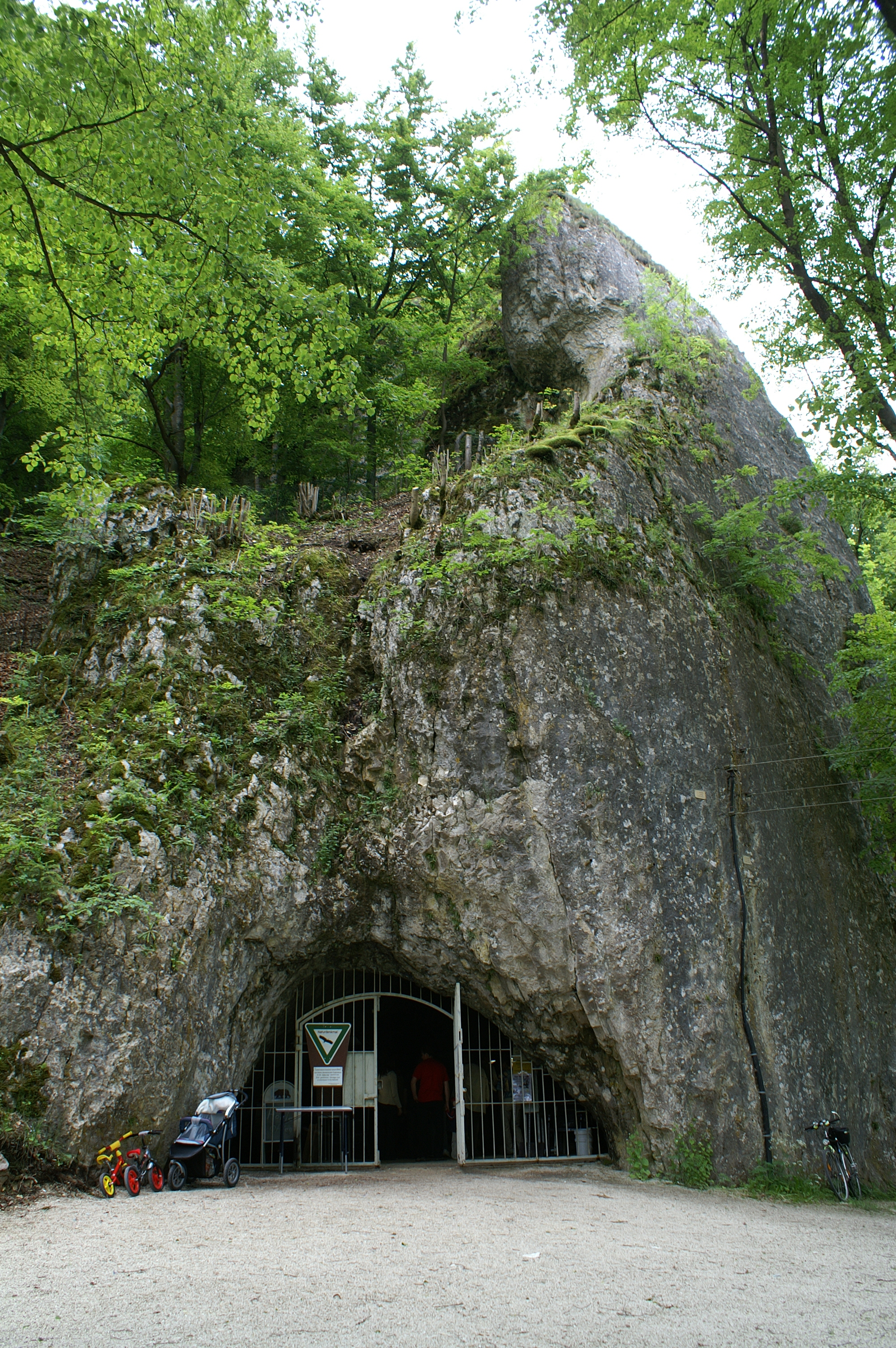
- The entrance of the Hohle Fels cave

- location in Baden-Württemberg, Germany Hohle Fels (Germany)
- Interactive map of Hohle Fels
- 48°22′45″N 9°45′20″E
- Periods: Upper Paleolithic
- Cultures: Aurignacian
- Location: Schelklingen, Baden-Württemberg, Germany
- Region: Ach Valley, Swabian Jura

UNESCO World Heritage Site
- Official name: Caves and Ice Age Art in the Swabian Jura
- Type: Cultural
- Criteria: iii
- Designated: 2017 (41st session)
- Reference no.: 1527
- Region: Europe and North America

The Hohle Fels (German pronunciation: [ˈhoːləˈfɛls]; also Hohlefels, Hohler Fels, German for "hollow rock") is a cave in the Swabian Jura of Germany that has yielded a number of important archaeological finds dating from the Upper Paleolithic. Artifacts found in the cave represent some of the earliest examples of prehistoric art and musical instruments ever discovered. The cave is just outside the town of Schelklingen in the state of Baden-Württemberg, near Ulm. Because of the outstanding archeological finds and their cultural significance, in 2017 the site became part of the UNESCO World Heritage Site Caves and Ice Age Art in the Swabian Jura.

== Discoveries ==
The first excavation took place in 1870, yielding remnants of cave bears, reindeer, mammoths and horses as well as tools belonging to the Aurignacian culture of the Upper Paleolithic.

Further excavations during 1958 to 1960, 1977, and 2002 yielded a number of notable finds, including several specimens of prehistoric sculpture such as an ivory bird and a human-lion hybrid figure similar to the Löwenmensch figurine but only 2.5 cm tall. In 2005, one of the oldest phallic representations was discovered.

In 2008, a team from the University of Tübingen, led by archaeologist Nicholas Conard, discovered an artifact known as the Venus of Hohle Fels, dated to about 35,000 to 40,000 years ago. This is the earliest known Venus figurine and the earliest undisputed example of expressly human figurative art. The team also unearthed a bone flute in the cave, and found two fragments of ivory flutes in nearby caves. The flutes date back at least 35,000 years and are some of the earliest musical instruments ever found. In 2012, it was announced that an earlier discovery of bone flute fragments in Geißenklösterle Cave now date back to about 42,000 years, instead of 37,000 years, as earlier perceived.

In 2020 a 20-centimetre long, 40,000 year old mammoth tusk with a line of four holes drilled into it was interpreted as being a device for making rope. Grooves around each hole would have held plant fibres in place. The instrument was found near the base of the Aurignacian deposits at Hohle Fels by a team led by Nicholas Conard of the institute of archaeological sciences at the University of Tübingen. Veerle Rots, of the University of Liège in Belgium was able to make four twisted strands of twine, using a bronze replica of the Hohle Fels cave device, an example of reconstruction archaeology. A similar 15,000 years old device, made of reindeer antler, was found in Gough's Cave in Cheddar Gorge, Somerset and at many other sites. The existence of these tools at different locations indicates rope-making had already become an important human activity by the Upper Paleolithic. Chris Stringer, Research Leader in Human Origins at the Natural History Museum, London, said, "These devices were called batons and were originally thought to have been carried by chiefs as badges of rank. However, they had holes with spirals round them and we now realise they must have been used to make or manipulate ropes." The ropes could then have been used to construct fishing nets, snares and traps, bows and arrows, clothing and containers for carrying food. Heavy objects, such as sleds, could now be hauled on ropes while spear points could be lashed to poles.

In July 2026, archaeologists excavating the cave in southwestern Germany uncovered two finely carved bird figurines made from mammoth ivory, each measuring only the size of a thumbnail and dating to approximately 40,000 years ago. Recovered from Aurignacian deposits about 1.5 metres apart, the carvings represent the earliest phases of modern human occupation in Europe and increase the total number of bird figurines known from the site to three. The sculptures display detailed anatomical features that may depict ptarmigans or other bird species, indicating careful observation of the natural environment and advanced ivory-carving techniques. The discovery contributes to the study of Upper Palaeolithic symbolic behaviour, artistic traditions, and figurative art among early Homo sapiens in Europe.

== Archaeogenetics ==
The remains of at least five distinct individuals were found at Hohle Fels. In 2016, researchers successfully extracted the DNA from three samples taken from the Magdalenian period found at Hohle Fels. The tests were performed on two femur fragments, HohleFels10 and HohleFels49, and a cranial fragment, HohleFels79. The two femur fragments possibly came from one individual. HohleFels10 and HohleFels49 were indirectly dated to around 16,000–14,260 BP BP, while HohleFels79 was directly dated to around 15,070–14,270 BP. All three samples were found to belong to mtDNA Haplogroup U8a. The Hohle Fels samples were found to be genetically closest to other ancient samples from the Magdalenian, showing closest genetic affinity to each other and for other samples taken from the Swabian Jura, such as Brillenhöhle, while also showing genetic affinity for another Magdalenian sample, taken from the Red Lady of El Mirón, as well as a sample from the Aurignacian, GoyetQ116-1, taken from Goyet Caves.

== UNESCO World Heritage Site ==
In January 2016, the federal government of Germany applied for the status of World Heritage Site for two valleys with six caves named Höhlen der ältesten Eiszeitkunst ("Caves with the oldest Ice Age art"). The site would encompass areas in the Lonetal (valley of the Lone) and the Achtal (valley of the Ach) both in the southern Swabian Jura. The former includes the caves Hohlenstein-Stadel, Vogelherd and Bocksteinhöhle, the latter Geissenklösterle, Hohle Fels and Sirgenstein Cave. Each valley would contain a core area of around 3 to 4 km (1.9 to 2.5 mi) length, surrounded by a buffer zone of a least 100 m (330 ft) width.

In the argument why these sites deserve recognition as a part of the universal human heritage, the area is described as the source of the currently oldest (non-stationary) works of human art in the form of carved animal and humanoid figurines as well as the oldest musical instruments. Their creators lived, were inspired and worked in and around these caves. The caves also served as the repositories of the figurines which may have been used in a religious context. In addition, they were the venue where performers used the excavated musical instruments and where the social groups lived from which the artists sprang.

The committee awarded the status of WHS in July 2017.

== See also ==
- Art of the Upper Paleolithic
