= Gustav Riek =

German archaeologist from the University of Tübingen who worked with the SS Ahnenerbe

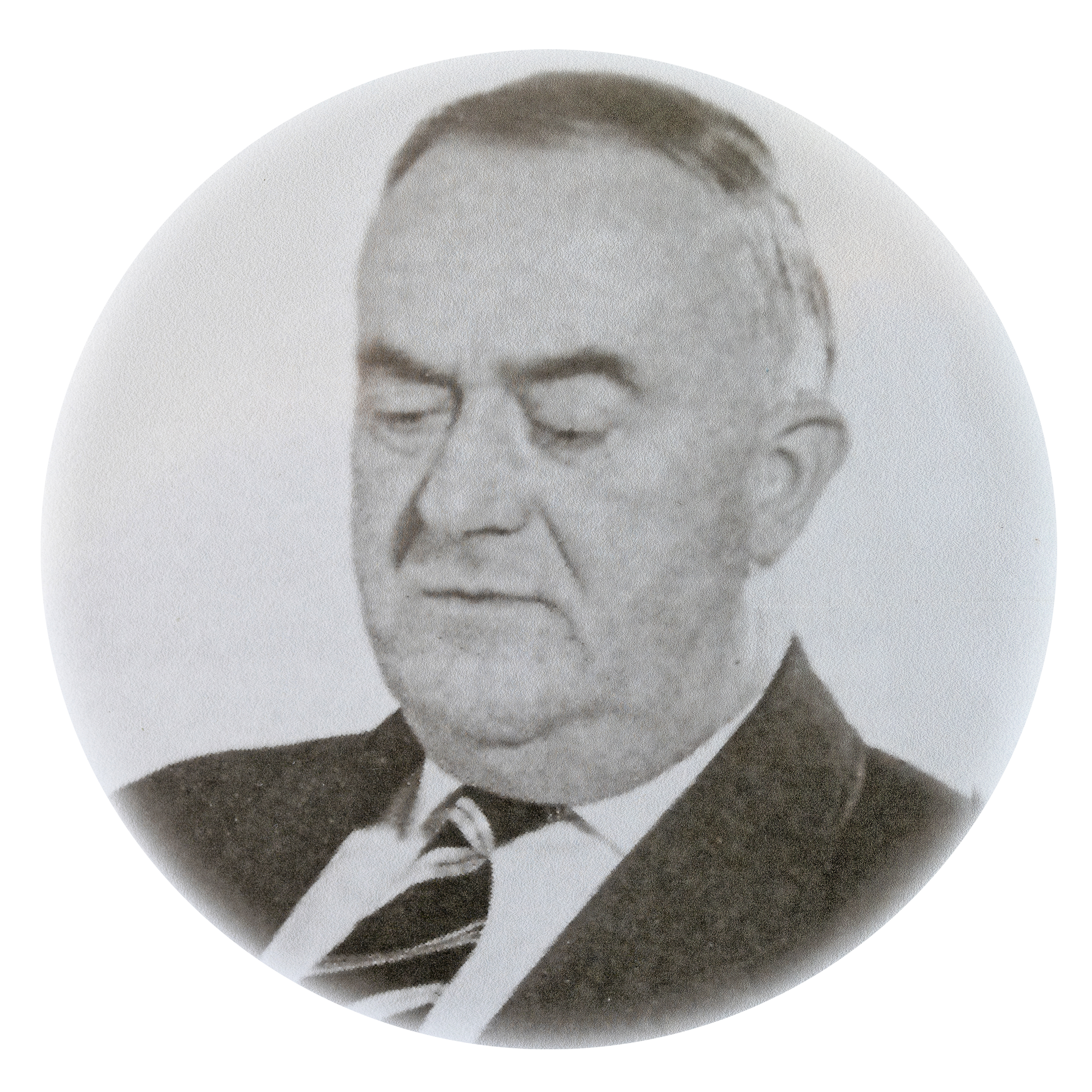
Image of Johannes Gustav Riek

Johannes Gustav Riek (May 23, 1900 in Stuttgart − November 1, 1976 in Feldstetten) was a German archaeologist from the University of Tübingen who worked with the SS Ahnenerbe in their excavations, and led the teams that excavated the Vogelherd Cave in 1931, the Heuneburg Tumulus burial mounds in 1937 and the Brillenhöhle 1955–63.

At Vogelherd, Riek discovered ivory figurines of the Aurignacian archeological tradition.

== Works ==
- Die Eiszeitjägerstation am Vogelherd im Lonetal (1934)
- Kulturbilder aus der Altsteinzeit Württembergs (1935)
- Die Mammutjäger vom Lonetal (1951)
