= Paleolithic flute =

Old Stone Age musical instruments

During regular archaeological excavations, several flutes that date to the European Upper Paleolithic were discovered in caves in the Swabian Alb region of Germany. Dated and tested independently by two laboratories, in England and Germany, the artifacts are authentic products of the Aurignacian archaeological culture. The Aurignacian flutes were created between 43,000 and 35,000 years ago. The flutes, made of bone and ivory, represent the earliest known musical instruments and provide unmistakable evidence of prehistoric music.

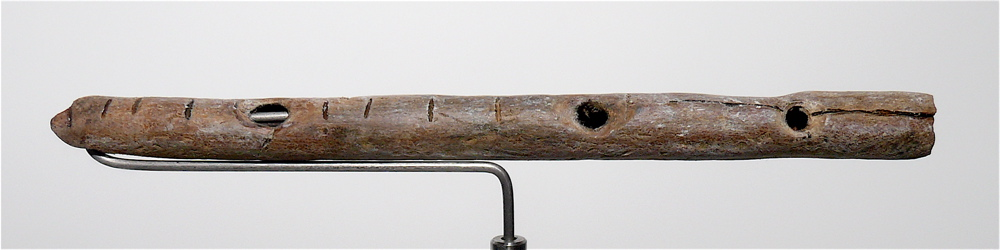
Aurignacian flute made from an animal bone, 43,000 to 39,000 years old, Geissenklösterle (Swabia)

The flutes were found in caves with the oldest known examples of figurative art. Music and sculpture as artistic expression have developed simultaneously among the first humans in Europe, as the region is considered a key area in which various cultural innovations have developed. In addition to recreational and religious purposes, such ritual music might have helped to maintain larger social networks. This may have provided a competitive advantage over the Neanderthals.

== Early flutes ==
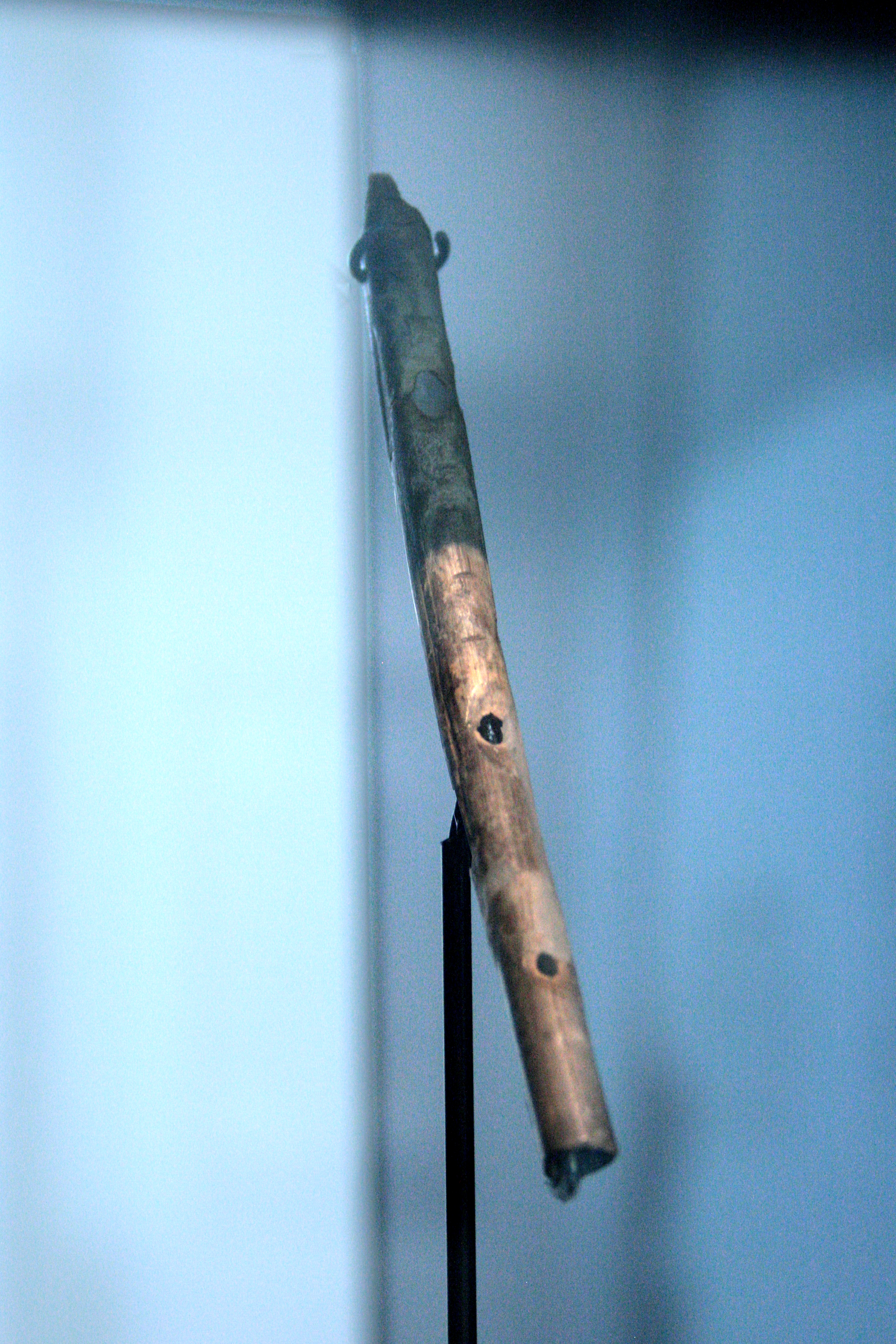
Aurignacian flute, 43,000–39,000 years old. Landesmuseum Württemberg, Stuttgart

In 2006, the Hohle Fels flute was discovered in the Hohle Fels cave in Germany's Swabian Alb. The flute is made from a vulture radius bone perforated with five finger holes, and dates to approximately 35,000 years ago. Several years before, two flutes made of mute swan bone and one made of woolly mammoth ivory were found in the nearby Geissenklösterle cave. The team that made the Hohle Fels discovery wrote that these finds were, at the time, the earliest evidence of humans being engaged in musical culture. They suggested music may have helped to maintain bonds between larger groups of humans, and that this may have helped the species to expand both in numbers and in geographical range. In 2012, a fresh high-resolution carbon dating examination revealed an age of 42,000 to 43,000 years for the Geissenklösterle cave flutes, suggesting that they could be older than the one from the Hohle Fels cave.

The artifact known as the Divje Babe flute, which was discovered in Slovenia in 1995, has also been suggested as the oldest Paleolithic flute, though this claim has been disputed. The artifact is AMS-14C dated to 43100 ± 700 year old cave bear femur pierced with spaced holes. Later dating using the more powerful ESR method has shown that the layer containing the flute is outside the dating range of the AMS-14C method and that the original dating of samples from this layer was incorrect. According to ESR dating, the age of the bone is now estimated at 50,000 to 60,000 years BP. Its discoverer suggested the holes were manmade and that there may have been four originally before the item was damaged. However, other scientists have argued that the holes were chewed by an animal.

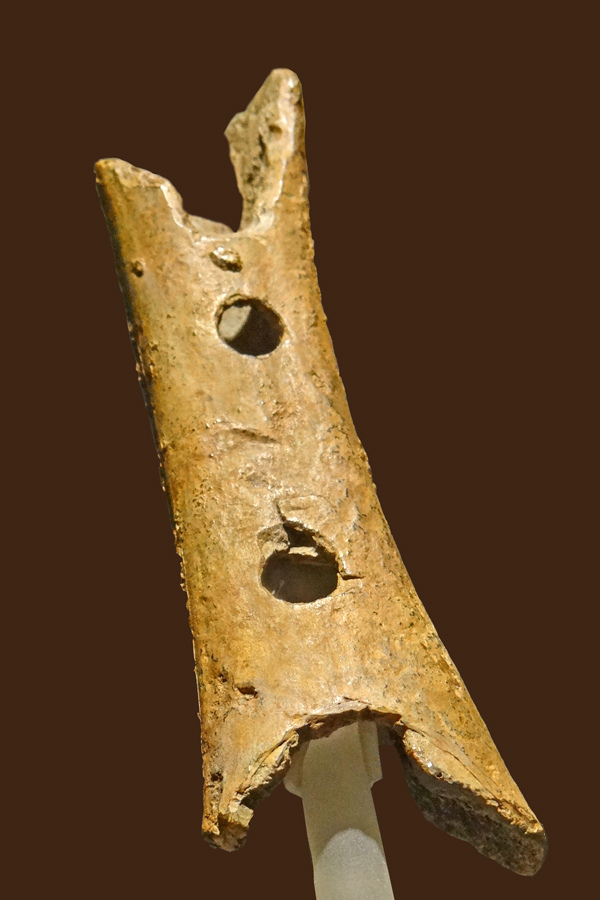
The Divje Babe "flute"

== See also ==
- Art of the Upper Paleolithic
