= Blau (Danube) =

River in Germany

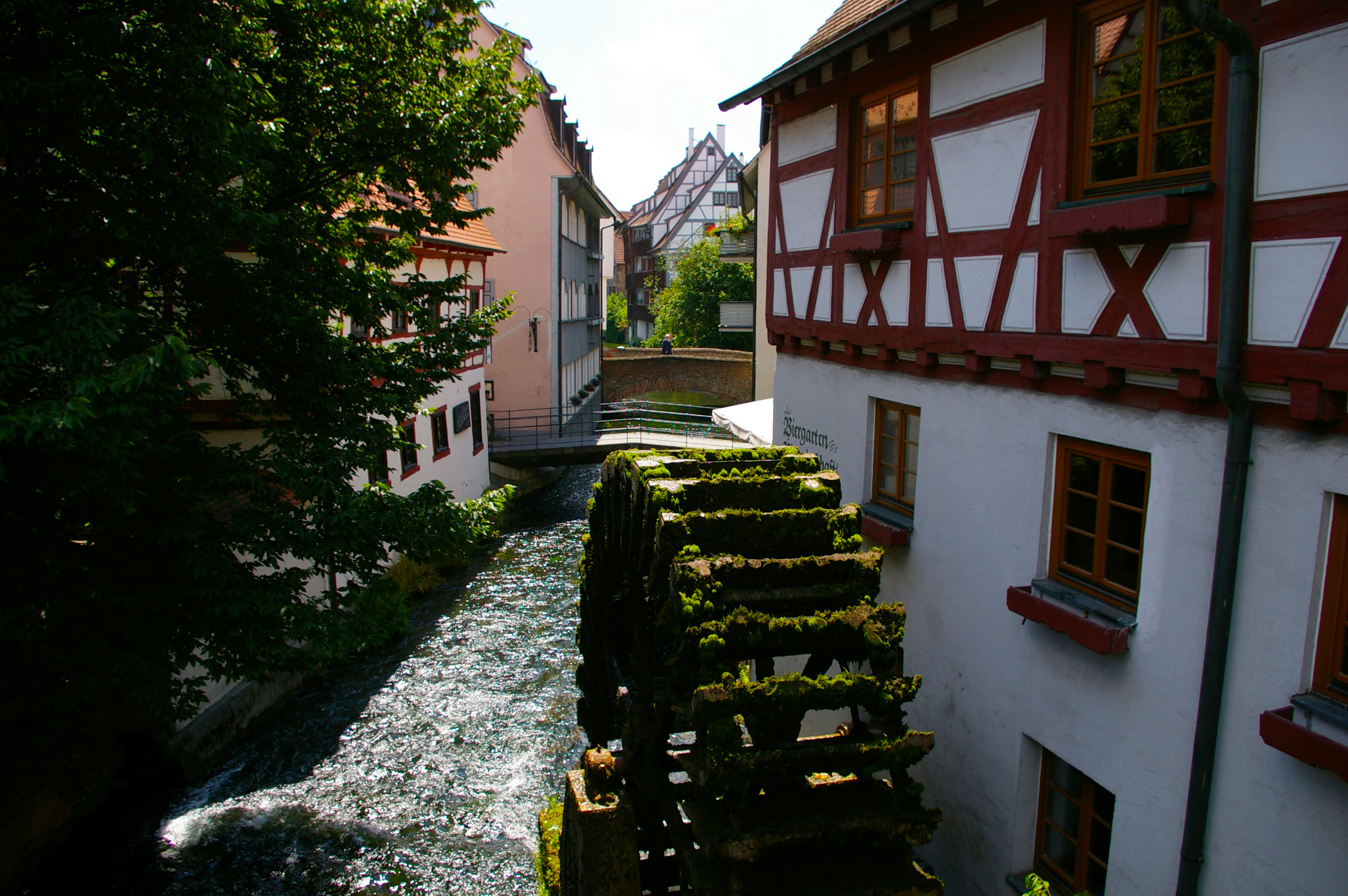
- The Blau in Ulm's historic "Fischerviertel", about 300 m before it flows into the Danube

Location
- Country: Germany
- State: Baden-Württemberg

Physical characteristics
- Mouth
  - location: Danube
  - coordinates: 48.38°N 9.7861°E
- Length: 22.2 km (13.8 mi)
- Basin size: 499 km^{2} (193 sq mi)

Basin features
- Progression: Danube→ Black Sea

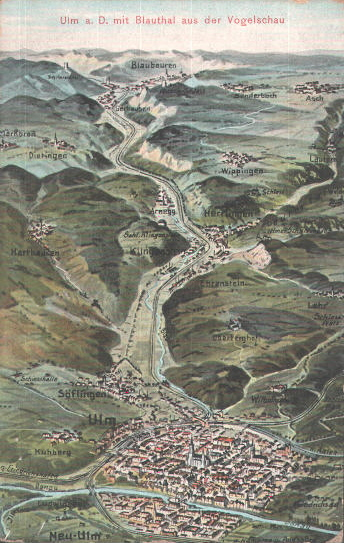
The course of the Blau from Blaubeuren to Ulm (Postcard by Eugen Felle, ca. 1900)

The Blau (German pronunciation: [blaʊ]) is a 22-kilometre-long (14 mi) river in Baden-Württemberg, southern Germany, and a left tributary of the Danube. The source of the Blau is the karst spring of Blautopf, in the town Blaubeuren, in the Swabian Jura. It flows east through Blaustein to the city of Ulm, where it empties into the Danube.

== Blau valley ==
The valley of the Blau was formed by the Danube. When the Swabian Jura rose, the Danube initially incised a deeper and deeper valley but finally chose a course to the southwest. In the valley it left behind today, the Schmiech river flows south meeting the Danube in Ehingen (Donau), whereas the Blau flows east towards Ulm.

== See also ==
- List of rivers of Baden-Württemberg
