= Nicholas Conard =

American archaeologist and prehistorian

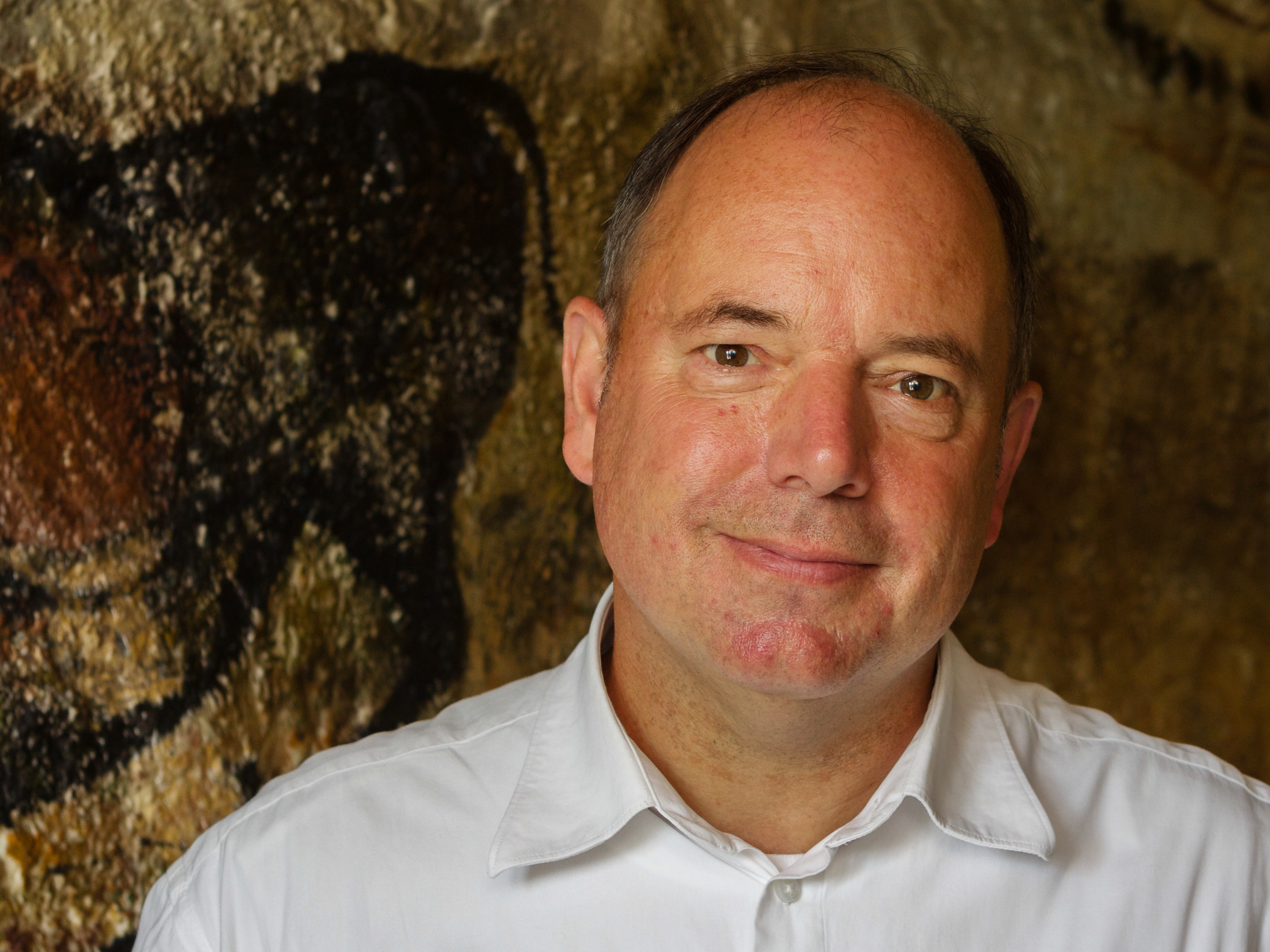
Nicholas Conard at the University of Tübingen Museum (2013)

Nicholas J. Conard (born July 23, 1961) is an American and naturalized German citizen who works as an archaeologist and prehistorian. He is the director of the department for early prehistory and quaternary ecology and the founding director of the Institute of Archaeological Sciences (Institut für Naturwissenschaftliche Archäologie) at the University of Tübingen in Germany.

Conard was born in Cincinnati.

== Education and career ==
Conard received his bachelor's degrees in anthropology and chemistry at the University of Rochester in 1983. He continued at the University of Rochester to be awarded with an interdisciplinary master's degree in physics, geology and anthropology in 1986. Conard earned an additional master's degree and a doctoral degree in anthropology at Yale University in 1988 and 1990, respectively. After achieving his Ph.D. he worked at the University of Connecticut as an assistant professor in anthropology from 1991 until 1993. In the mid-1990s, he worked at the Römisch-Germanisches Zentralmuseum in Mainz/Neuwied as a Humboldt Research Fellow. He was appointed to the position Chair of Early Prehistory and Quaternary Ecology at the University of Tübingen in 1995.

== Research ==
Conard is a specialist in the study of Paleolithic archaeology. He mainly works on sites from the middle to late Pleistocene of Germany and South Africa, but has also directed and co-directed fieldwork taking place in Iran, the United Arab Emirates, and Syria. His research combines analysis of stone tools, faunal remains, and site formation processes to better understand the context of late human evolution, including the evolution of modern humans and their subsequent dispersal out of Africa.

Some of his most important scientific contributions have come as the project leader of a team working on an archaeological examination of the Hohle Fels cave in the Swabian Jura area, a low mountain range in Baden-Württemberg, Germany, bounded by the Danube in the southeast and the upper Neckar in the northwest. This is near where the Löwenmensch figurine (meaning "lion-human") was found in 1939, forgotten due to the war, and reexamined only following a 1997 discovery of additional parts of the figurine. Conard's team has been exploring the Hohe Fels site since the mid- to late 2000s. In 2015 they uncovered more fragments of human female figurines that date to the Aurignacian, an Upper Paleolithic culture, confirming dates exceeded only by the Löwenmensch figurine and that such female figurines are more widely distributed than had been thought previously. While under his direction, the Caves and Ice Age Art in the Swabian Jura were inscribed on the UNESCO World Heritage List in 2017.

Conard is leader of the research project at Schöningen, a 300,000-year-old site where prehistoric humans made and used wooden spears and throwing sticks, hunted horses, butchered straight-tusked elephants, and processed bear pelts.

Sibudu Cave is a prehistoric rock shelter and an important archaeological site from the Middle Stone Age in South Africa, dating between 77,000 and 38,000 years ago. Conard, director of excavations at the site since 2011, has lauded it for the quality of preservation of an extensive Middle Stone Age record, as shown by the large assemblage of stone tools and organic materials.

== Honors and awards ==
- 2010 Order of Merit of Baden-Württemberg
- 2011 Member of the Heidelberg Academy for Sciences and Humanities
- 2021 Distinguished Alumnus, Oakwood High School, Ohio

== Selected articles ==
- Conard, Nicholas J.; Rots, Veerle (February 2, 2024). "Rope making in the Aurignacian of Central Europe more than 35,000 years ago". Science Advances. 10 (5) eadh5217. Bibcode:2024SciA...10H5217C. doi:10.1126/sciadv.adh5217. PMC 10830101. PMID 38295167.
- Kandel, Andrew W.; Sommer, Christian; Kanaeva, Zara; Bolus, Michael; Bruch, Angela A.; Groth, Claudia; Haidle, Miriam N.; Hertler, Christine; Heß, Julia; Malina, Maria; Märker, Michael; Hochschild, Volker; Mosbrugger, Volker; Schrenk, Friedemann; Conard, Nicholas J. (August 1, 2023). "The ROCEEH Out of Africa Database (ROAD): A large-scale research database serves as an indispensable tool for human evolutionary studies". PLOS ONE. 18 (8) e0289513. Bibcode:2023PLoSO..1889513K. doi:10.1371/journal.pone.0289513. PMC 10393170. PMID 37527270.
- Venditti, Flavia; Rodríguez-Álvarez, Bárbara; Serangeli, Jordi; Cesaro, Stella Nunziante; Walter, Rudolf; Conard, Nicholas J. (December 15, 2022). "Using microartifacts to infer Middle Pleistocene lifeways at Schöningen, Germany". Scientific Reports. 12 (1): 21148. Bibcode:2022NatSR..1221148V. doi:10.1038/s41598-022-24769-3. PMC 9755147. PMID 36522355.
- Conard, Nicholas J.; Serangeli, Jordi; Bigga, Gerlinde; Rots, Veerle (April 20, 2020). "A 300,000-year-old throwing stick from Schöningen, northern Germany, documents the evolution of human hunting". Nature Ecology & Evolution. 4 (5): 690–693. Bibcode:2020NatEE...4..690C. doi:10.1038/s41559-020-1139-0. PMID 32313174.
- Posth, Cosimo; Wißing, Christoph; Kitagawa, Keiko; Pagani, Luca; van Holstein, Laura; Racimo, Fernando; Wehrberger, Kurt; Conard, Nicholas J.; Kind, Claus Joachim; Bocherens, Hervé; Krause, Johannes (July 4, 2017). "Deeply divergent archaic mitochondrial genome provides lower time boundary for African gene flow into Neanderthals". Nature Communications. 8 (1) 16046. Bibcode:2017NatCo...816046P. doi:10.1038/ncomms16046. PMC 5500885. PMID 28675384.
- Riehl, Simone; Zeidi, Mohsen; Conard, Nicholas J. (July 5, 2013). "Emergence of Agriculture in the Foothills of the Zagros Mountains of Iran". Science. 341 (6141): 65–67. Bibcode:2013Sci...341...65R. doi:10.1126/science.1236743. PMID 23828939.
- Conard, Nicholas J.; Malina, Maria; Münzel, Susanne C. (August 2009). "New flutes document the earliest musical tradition in southwestern Germany". Nature. 460 (7256): 737–740. Bibcode:2009Natur.460..737C. doi:10.1038/nature08169. PMID 19553935.
- Conard, Nicholas J. (May 2009). "A female figurine from the basal Aurignacian of Hohle Fels Cave in southwestern Germany". Nature. 459 (7244): 248–252. Bibcode:2009Natur.459..248C. doi:10.1038/nature07995. PMID 19444215.
- Conard, Nicholas J.; Grootes, Pieter M.; Smith, Fred H. (July 2004). "Unexpectedly recent dates for human remains from Vogelherd". Nature. 430 (6996): 198–201. Bibcode:2004Natur.430..198C. doi:10.1038/nature02690. PMID 15241412.
- Conard, Nicholas J. (December 2003). "Palaeolithic ivory sculptures from southwestern Germany and the origins of figurative art". Nature. 426 (6968): 830–832. Bibcode:2003Natur.426..830C. doi:10.1038/nature02186. PMID 14685236.
- Conard, Nicholas; Asch, David L.; Asch, Nancy B.; Elmore, David; Gove, Harry; Rubin, Meyer; Brown, James A.; Wiant, Michael D.; Farnsworth, Kenneth B.; Cook, Thomas G. (March 1984). "Accelerator radiocarbon dating of evidence for prehistoric horticulture in Illinois". Nature. 308 (5958): 443–446. Bibcode:1984Natur.308..443C. doi:10.1038/308443a0.
