= Schmiech =

River in Germany

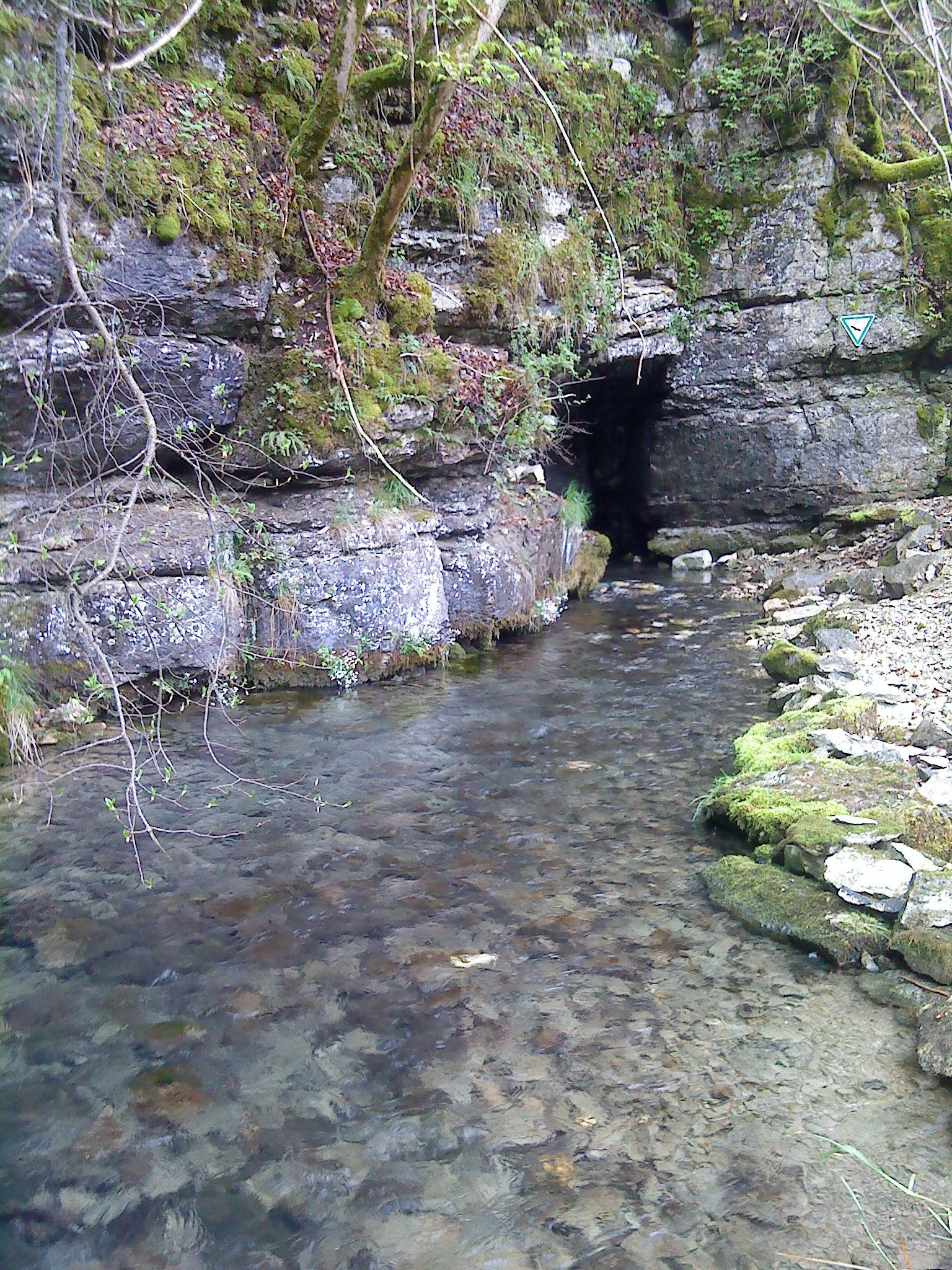

Location
- Country: Germany
- State: Baden-Württemberg

Physical characteristics
- Source
  - location: Swabian Alb
- Mouth
  - location: Danube
  - coordinates: 48.2740°N 9.7403°E
- Length: 25.4 km (15.8 mi)

Basin features
- Progression: Danube→ Black Sea

Schmiech is a small river in the Swabian Alb, Baden-Württemberg, Germany. Its source is a karst spring. It flows into the Danube in Ehingen (Donau).

== See also ==
- List of rivers of Baden-Württemberg
