= HFZ =

HFZ or HfZ may refer to:

- HFZ Capital Group, American investment company
- HFZ, current code of HUB Delivery Set #117 and #118, types of New South Wales HUB type carriage stock, Australia
- HFZ, station code for Hafizpet railway station, India
- Hunter fracture zone, fault zone south of Fiji
- Hydrate formation zone, used in mineralization and deep sea sediments of carbon sequestration
- HFZ, short name for Homofenazine, antipsychotic medication
- HfZ, short name for Hotelfachschule Zürich, school of Swiss businessman Andreas Meier
