= Kunsthalle Weishaupt =

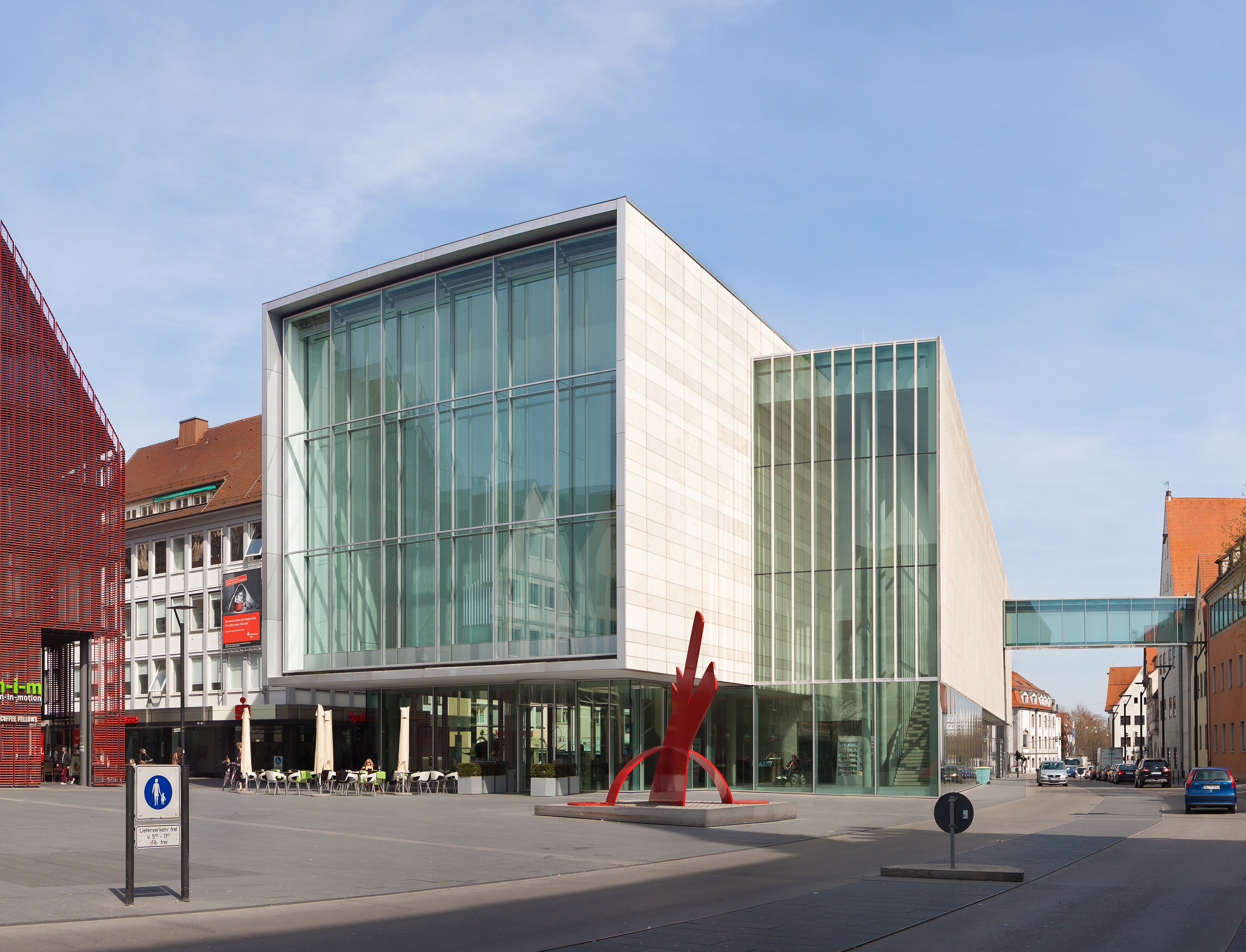
- Established: 2007
- Location: Ulm, Baden-Württemberg, Germany
- Type: Art gallery
- Website: kunsthalle-weishaupt.de

Kunsthalle Weishaupt is an art gallery located in Ulm, in Baden-Würtemberg, Germany. It houses a private collection of modern art. The Kunsthalle Weishaupt was founded in 2007.

== History ==
The Kunsthalle Weishaupt is owned by entrepreneur Siegfried Weishaupt. The construction of the building took place from 2005 to 2007, and cost 10 million euros. Weishaupt was awarded the contract for the design of the Kunsthalle Weishaupt.

== Collection ==
Siegfried Weishaupt and his wife have collected modern art since 1967. Weishaupt stated that the collection does not follow a specific concept but is compiled by gut feeling. However, some focuses have evolved within the collection.

The collection comprises over 400 paintings and sculptures; drawings, graphic works and other works on paper not included in the number. Among the collected works are important works of modern art from the 1950s and 1960s, for example by Roy Lichtenstein, Andy Warhol (who painted the Weishaupt company founder Max Weishaupt), Willem de Kooning, Keith Haring and Karl Gerstner. International colour field painting of the 1960s is a focus of the collection, with works by Mark Rothko, Ad Reinhardt, Frank Stella, Agnes Martin, Morris Louis and Kenneth Noland. It further contains works by the artist group ZERO, among them works by the founders Heinz Mack and Otto Piene, by Günther Uecker, Pol Bury, as well as works by artists who influenced this group such as Lucio Fontana, Piero Manzoni and Enrico Castellani. Another focus are paintings by the hard-edge artist Josef Albers. From Imi Knoebel, Günther Förg, Markus Oehlen, Robert Longo, Yves Klein, Barry Flanagan, John Armleder, Nam June Paik, Jean Tinguely, John Chamberlain, François Morellet, Maurizio Nannucci, Keith Sonnier, Hans Arp and Erich Hauser, exemplary works are included in the collection.
