= Hermann Duckek =

Hermann Duckek (September 9, 1936 in Ulm/Donau, Germany, - March 3, 2001 in Hoersholm, Denmark) was a German farmer and riding-master known for his expertise in equestrian sports surfaces. He dedicated his professional life to international equestrian competitions. Known as the "Duke of Dirt" (in German, Bodenpapst), Duckek was considered the world's preeminent authority on riding arenas. He built sports surfaces globally for hundreds of top events, notably at the Olympic Games.

== Background and Career ==
At the age of 26, Duckek decided to hand over the daily running of his parents' farms to another family member and to turn his hobby, riding, into his métier.

In 1966, at the age of 29, after an education in Flensburg, Germany with the old-master Karl Diel, Duckek achieved his riding-master title.

Duckek's riding lessons brought him into contact with a group of Danes, who asked him to come to Denmark after his graduation as the leader of the Nordborg Riding Club.

At the end of 1966, Duckek married his German born wife Wiltrud, and the couple moved to their new country.

After working some years in Nordborg, Sønderborg and Hvam in Southern Jutland, he was asked in 1971 to continue his work at Holte Riding Club in the north of Copenhagen. As riding-master and daily leader of the school, he felt the need for international contact and competition. With the consent of the Board of Directors, and by special agreement with Holte's president, Jørn Engel-Møller, Holte Ugerne, the highly successful Holte Week was created.

At Holte, the most famous riders he trained with were Lis Hartel and Ulla Håkansson. Between 1966 and 1978, Duckek taught another 19 students seeking recognition as dressage riding masters.

=== Arena surfaces ===
Known for his well-kept arenas in Holte, Duckek was asked in 1974 to maintain the existing arena for the Dressage World Championship in Copenhagen. On this occasion, he met the chairman of the Canadian Equestrian Federation, George Jacobsen, who asked him for his cooperation to build the riding stadium for the Montréal Olympic Games in Bromont, Canada in 1976.

In 1986, Duckek founded the "International Dressage Trainer Club, serving as President.

When constructing arenas, Duckek assumed full responsibility for each project. He was regarded as an effective problem-solver who balanced the financial interests of event organizers with the expectations of riders and the public.

Fibresand in Stockholm, rubber-mats in the park of Wiesbaden, Geotex-sand-mixture in Gothenburg, and other locations were Duckek's idea.

When in 1991 he brought the Volvo World Cup to Brøndby/Denmark (later to Vilhelmsborg), he created the idea of 4-in-hand driving in a hall, an idea which has been adopted by several event organizers.

=== Death ===
While preparing the footing for the equestrian events at the 2000 Summer Olympic Games in Sydney, Duckek began to feel fatigued. On his return home to Denmark, he was diagnosed with cancer. Duckek died in Hoersholm, Denmark on 3 March 2001 at age 64.

== Arenas ==
Duckek was - fully or partly - responsible, in accordance with the organizers, for the choice of materials, construction, installation, re-installation and maintenance of dressage and jumping arenas:

- Olympic arenas: 1976 Montréal, Canada, 1988 Seoul, Korea, 1992 Barcelona, Spain, 1996 Atlanta, USA and 2000 Sydney, Australia
- World Championship arenas dressage: 1974 Copenhagen, Denmark, 1978 Goodwood, Great Britain, 1982 Lausanne, Switzerland, 1986 Cedar Valley, Canada, 1990 Stockholm, Sweden, 1994 The Hague, Netherlands, 1998 Rome, Italy
- World Championship arenas jumping: 1990 Stockholm, Sweden, 1998 Rome, Italy
- European Championship arenas dressage: 1977 St. Gallen/Switzerland, 1979 Aarhus/Denmark, 1983 Aachen/Germany, 1987 Goodwood/Great Britain, 1989 Mondorf-les-Bains/Luxemburg, 1991 Donaueschingen/Germany, 1993 Lipica/Slovenia, 1995 Mondorf-les-Bains/Luxemburg, 1997 Verden/Germany, 1999 Arnhem/Netherlands
- Volvo World Cup final arenas jumping from 1978 to 1985, and from 1986 both jumping and dressage in Gothenburg/Sweden, 1989 Gothenburg and Tampa/USA, 1990 Gothenburg and Dortmund/Germany, 1991 Gothenburg and Paris-Bercy/France, 1992 Gothenburg and Del Mar/USA, 1993 Gothenburg and s’Hertogenbosch/Netherlands, 1994 Gothenburg and s’Hertogenbosch/Netherlands, 1995 Gothenburg and Los Angeles/USA, 1996 Gothenburg and Genève/Switzerland, 1997 Gothenburg and s’Hertogenbosch/Netherlands, 1998 Gothenburg and Helsinki/Finland
- World Cup final jumping: 2000 Las Vegas, USA
- Annual international competitions: Aachen, Dortmund, Berlin, Wiesbaden, Bremen, Hamburg, Düsseldorf, Stuttgart, Frankfurt, Donaueschingen, Spangenberg, Gera, Kiel and Neumünster in Germany, New York/USA, Toronto/Canada, Zürich and Genève/Switzerland, Oberanven/Luxemburg, Sevilla/Spain, St. Petersburg/Russia, Dublin/Ireland
- Others: Münster, Bad Salzuflen, Bad Honnef in Germany, Flyinge/Sweden, Modena/Italy, Punchestown/Ireland, Lugano/Switzerland, Monterrey/Mexico, São Paulo/Brazil, Hamilton/Bermuda.

== Special events ==
The lost Gold Medal

The Olympic Games were held in Montréal, Canada in 1976. The Olympic riding competitions were held in Bromont, one hour drive from Montréal. Germany, with Harry Boldt/Woyceck, Dr. Reiner Klimke/Mehmed and Gabriela Grillo/Ultimo, won the team competition in dressage. After the victory ceremony the riders made, as usual, the honorary round on horseback, happily waving to the big crowd. The shock was incredible when Gabriela Grillo realized that she had lost her medal during the ride, knowing that a medal is not replaceable. While the public was leaving the area, Duckek, surrounded and supported by his 12 volunteers, promised to do his best to find the lost medal in the sand of the big stadium - an enterprise similar to find a needle in the haystack. He succeeded.

Hermann Duckek at fibresand, Stockholm. Photo: Franz Steindl

Decoration for Holte Weeks

Having a calendar in his home showing the Ridinger drawings of dressage horses, Duckek got the idea to ask a specialist to enlarge several of these drawings to the size about 2 x 2.50 m for decoration of the indoor arena in Holte in the Seventies. This decoration is still used when Holte Riding Club arranges dressage competitions.

Fibresand 1990 in Stockholm

Stockholms Olympiastadium was opened in 1912 to host the Olympic Equestrian Games. In 1990 it was chosen for the World Equestrian Championships, including Dressage, Jumping and 4-in-hand-driving. The competition ground became a big challenge for Duckek. Olympia stadium had also been used for concerts from artists such as The Rolling Stones, Robbie Williams and Kent, and consequently the drainage in a big section of the competition area had collapsed. What to do? A safe footing had to be created for dressage, jumping, and 4-in-hand driving. For this situation Duckek invented fibresand. In this special arena, unique for Stockholm, the sand was coloured green. The fibresand was produced in Luxembourg, coloured in Denmark and, finally, sent by ship to Stockholm.

Hermann's Hill

1986's World Championships in Dressage, Cedar Valley, Canada. The evening before the opening day Duckek and his wife, Wiltrud, were invited for dinner at the property of the hosts of these championships, Eva-Maria Pracht and her husband Hans. Eva-Maria's parents, Dr. and Mrs. Joseph Neckermann, were also present. During the dinner it started to rain and Duckek asked if he was allowed to put a water-glass outside to measure how much rain had fallen. After 30 minutes the glass was full. Duckek returned to the stadium as darkness was falling. The recently built stadium, built under Canadian management and to a Canadian concept design, had hilly surroundings and no illumination. For the competition area itself, some 35 m x 75 m, Duckek had used rocks, plants, flowers, and as a special tribute to emphasize the beauty of Canadian nature, he used large wooden chips to decorate the judge boxes. Standing on one of the hills in the stadium, Duckek could not believe his own eyes. The drainage did not work and, worst of all, the wooden chips were drifting all over this newborn "lake". Concerned about the heavy rain, other stadium personnel arrived. In the darkness headlights illuminated a ghostly scene. It took considerable time for the "lake" to drain and it took many hours to replace the wooden chips. The competition, and the worldwide TV-transmission started the next day with only two hours delay. Duckek's observation hill, from which he looked down at the disastrous situation the previous night, received without his knowledge, a name-plate: "Hermann's Hill". After the championship Duckek took the name-plate home to Denmark.

International Dressage Trainer Seminars

These seminars were held every second year at different locations and different countries. In 1997 the seminar took place at the stud Flyinge in Sweden. The gala-evening was arranged at the small and beautiful castle "Trollenäs" in Esløv, a 30 minutes drive from Lund. The trainers and special invited guests, about 40 persons in all including Princess Benedikte (the younger sister of the Danish Queen), enjoyed each other's company, meals and drinks. Just before the end of the dinner the Princess wished to say some words. She closed her speech by asking the participants to join her in giving a toast to the horses. This toast involves participants climbing onto their chairs, placing the tip of their left shoe on the table (you always put the left foot into the stirrup mounting a horse) and, following the command of the speaker who proposes the toast, the participants answer as the speaker proposed: To the horses. The princess was given big applause, nobody fell off their chair, and the guests, most of whom knew nothing of this tradition, enjoyed this experience.

The tree in Aachen

Aachen, Germany has the biggest competition stadium for horses worldwide. At the end of the millennium the organizers decided to carry out a major renovation of the old dressage stadium and to give the whole area a new face: The Garden of Eden Garten Eden – Garten der Pferde im Tal der Soers. To obtain financial support, the organizers had the idea to offer sponsorships for trees and plants. Duckek, who had his birthday shortly before the opening of the Sydney 2000 Olympic Games September 15, 2000, was happily surprised when his wife gave him his birthday present, a tree in Aachen including a plate inscribed with his name. Meeting one of the organizers during the Olympics, Frank Kempermann, he discussed the placement of "his tree". Duckek remarked that it should be closest to the trainer seat, where he, for many years in a row, had discussed with his colleagues the performances of the most famous dressage riders and horses in the world. The trainer seat has gone – Duckek too – but his tree is growing.
