= Ulm =

City in Baden-Württemberg, Germany

- City
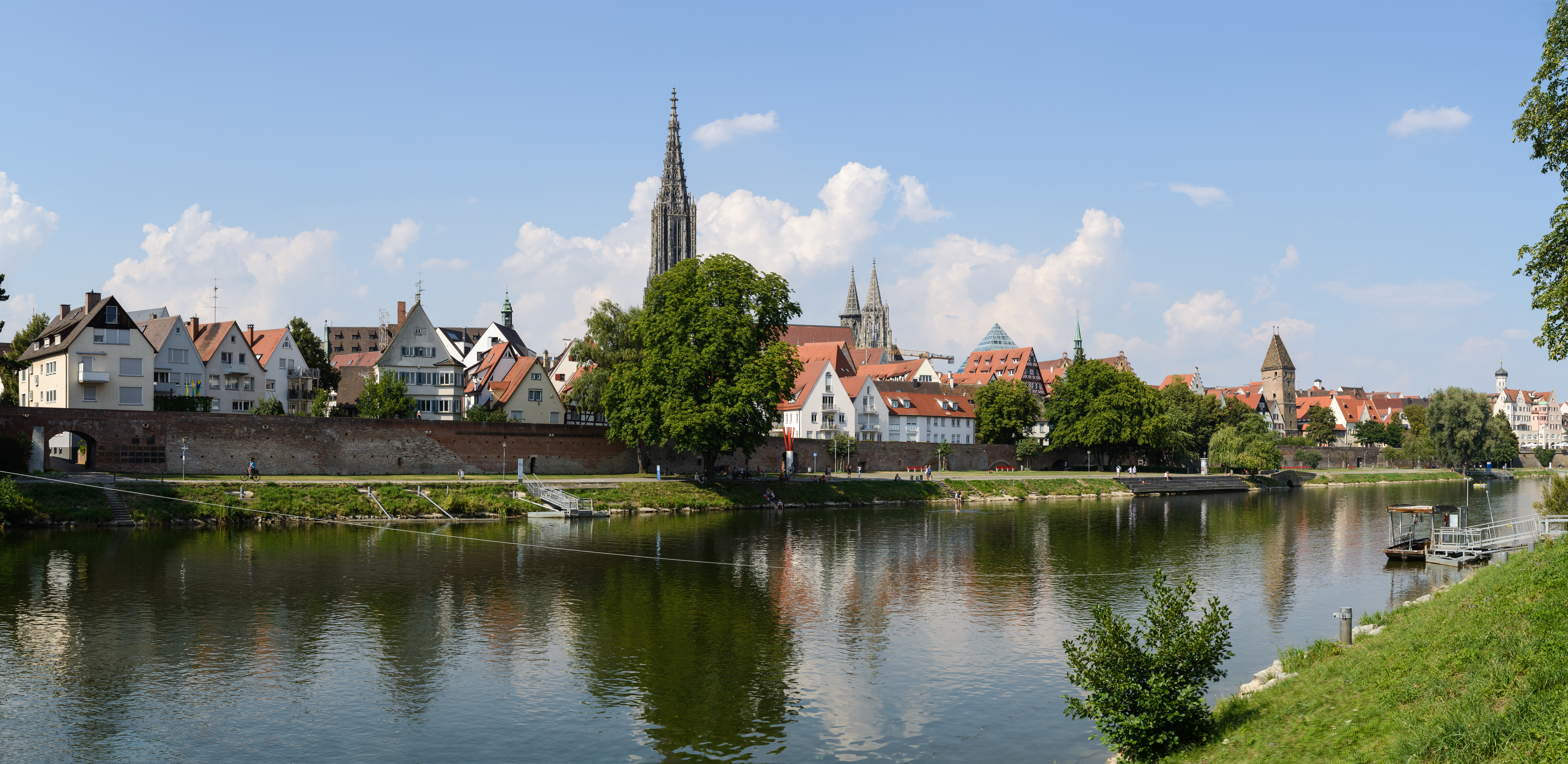
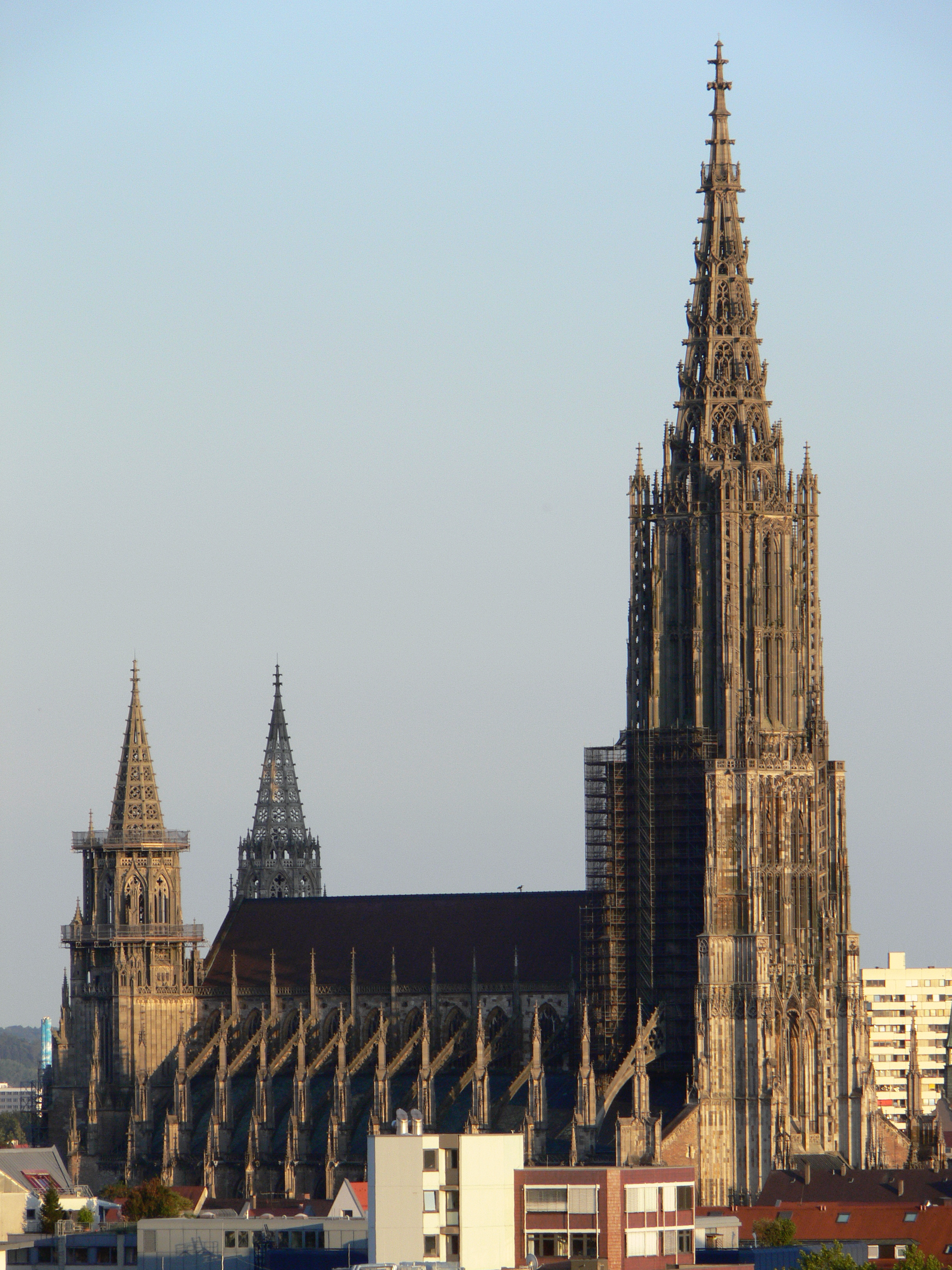
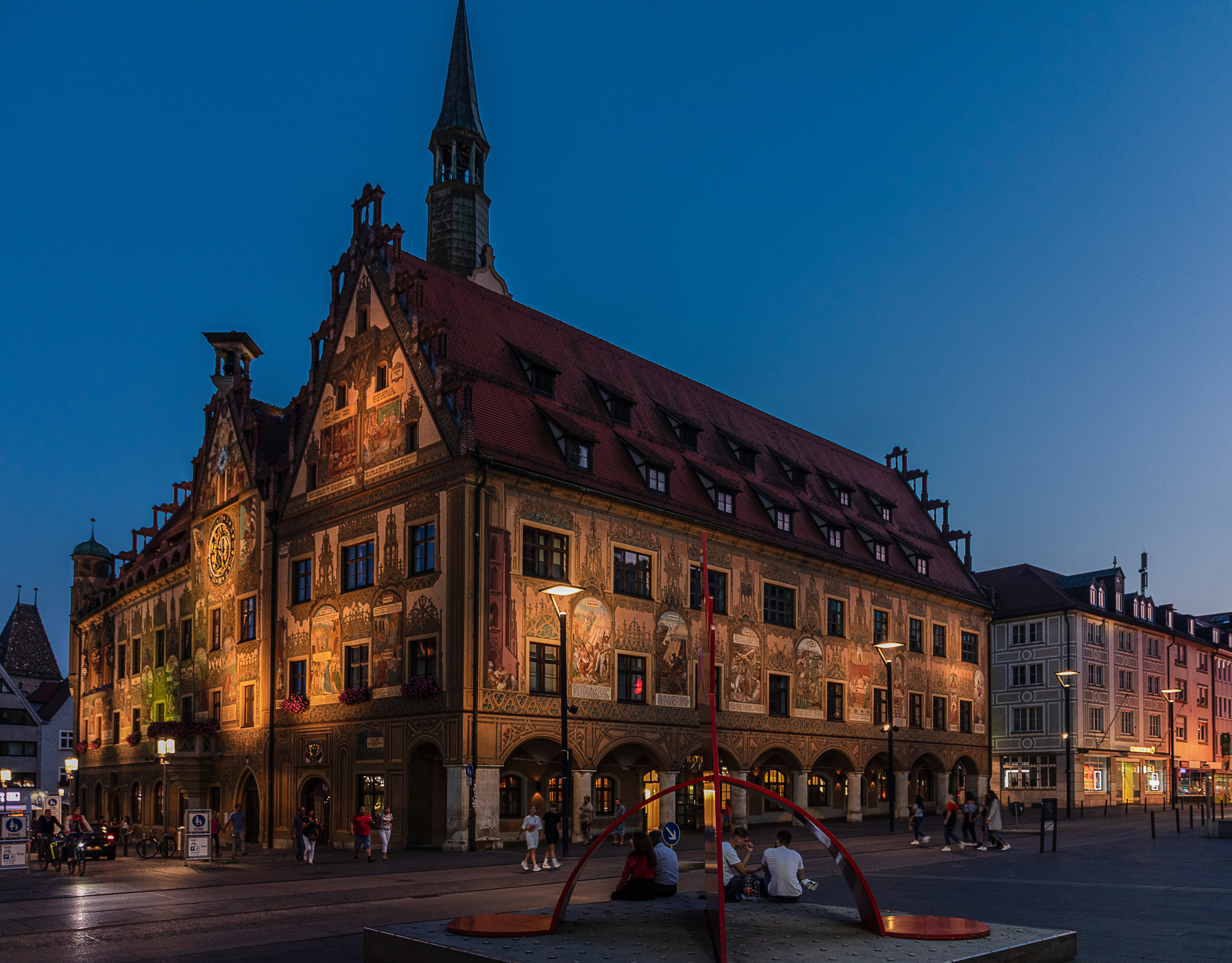
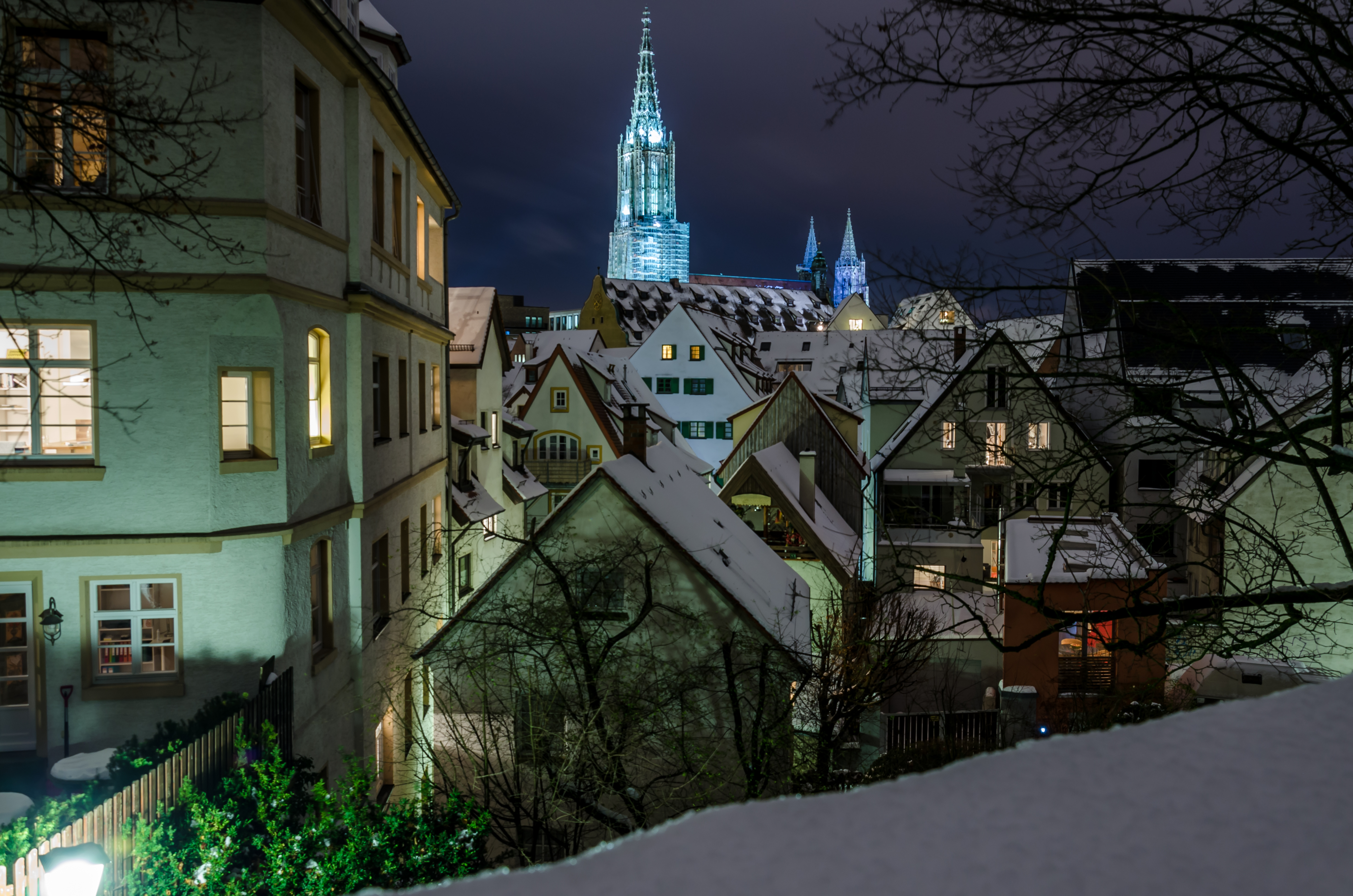
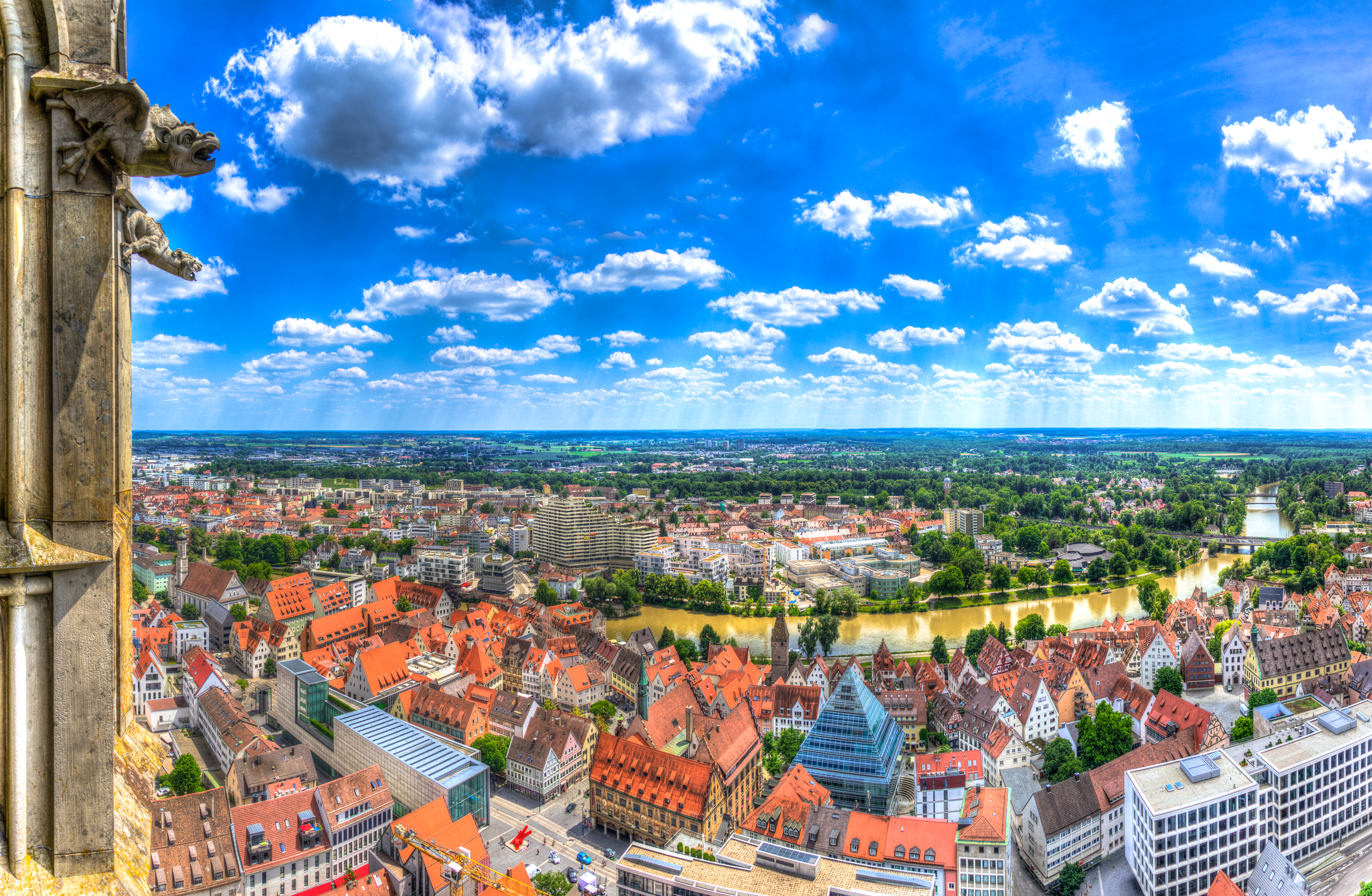
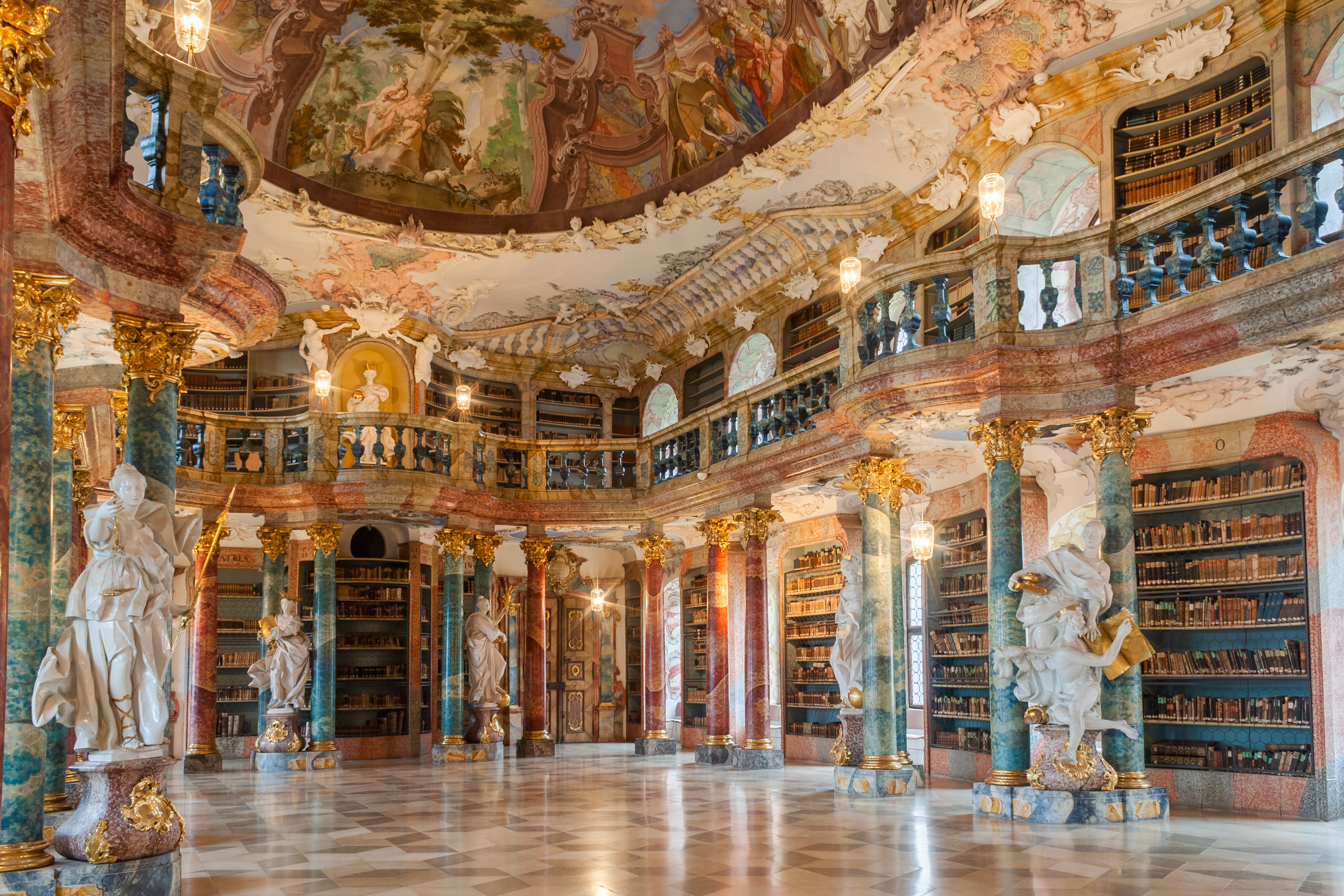
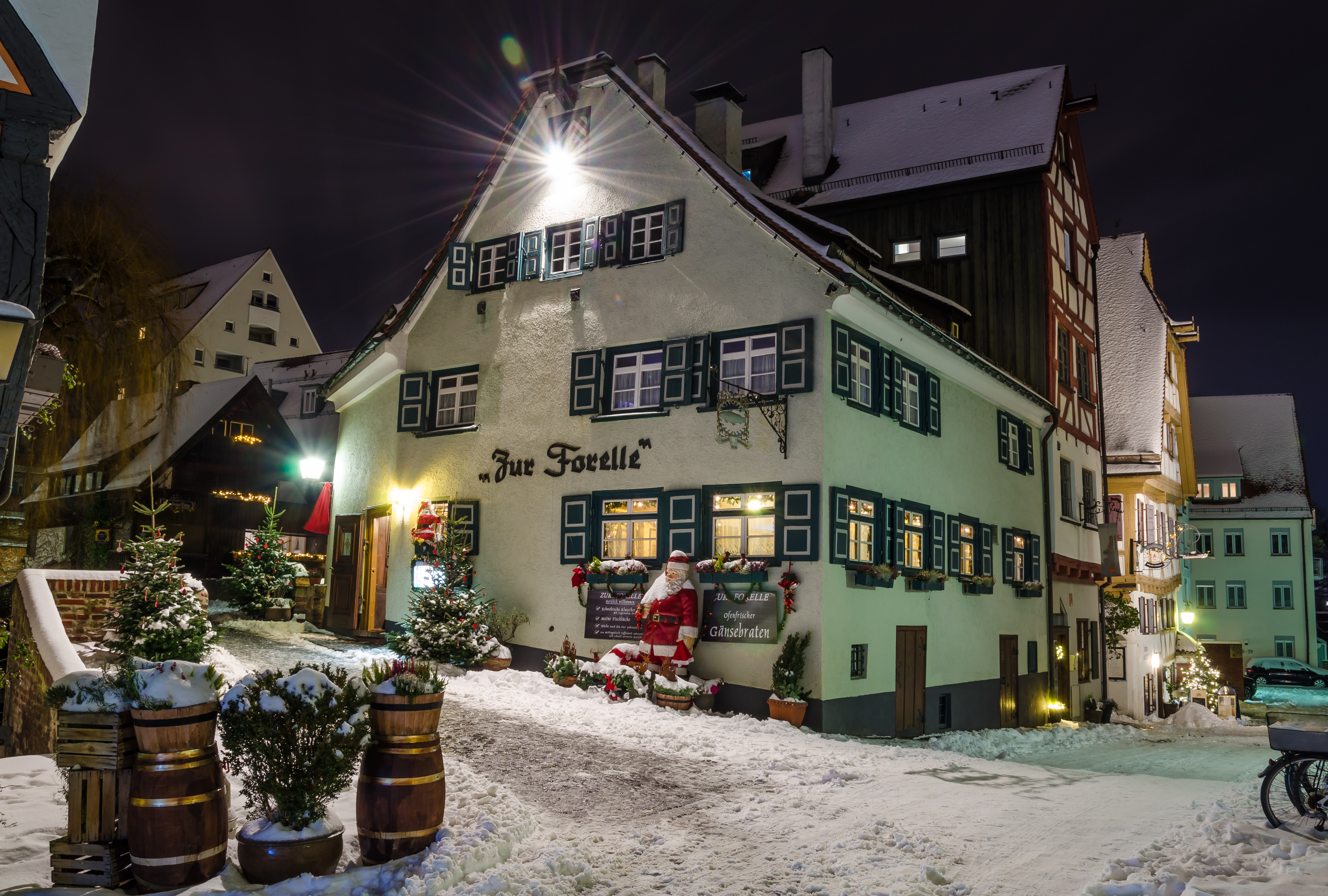
- Ulm on the banks of the Danube Ulm Minster City Hall Wintry Ulm View from the Minster Wiblingen Abbey Fishermen's Quarter

- Flag Coat of arms
- Interactive map of Ulm
- Location within Germany Location within Baden-Württemberg
- Coordinates: 48°23′55″N 9°59′28″E
- Country: Germany
- State: Baden-Württemberg
- Admin. region: Tübingen
- District: Urban district
- First mentioned: 854 AD
- Subdivisions: 18 Stadtteile

Government
  - Mayor (2024–32): Martin Ansbacher (SPD)

Area
  - Total: 118.69 km^{2} (45.83 sq mi)
- Elevation: 478 m (1,568 ft)

Population (2025-12-31)
  - Total: 130,288
  - Density: 1,097.7/km^{2} (2,843.1/sq mi)
- Time zone: UTC+01:00 (CET)
  - Summer (DST): UTC+02:00 (CEST)
- Postal codes: 89073–89081
- Dialling codes: 0731, 07304, 07305, 07346
- Vehicle registration: UL
- Website: www.ulm.de

Ulm (German: [ʊlm]) is the sixth-largest city of the southwestern German state of Baden-Württemberg, and with around 130,000 inhabitants, it is Germany's 60th-largest city.

Ulm is located on the eastern edges of the Swabian Jura mountain range, on the upper course of the River Danube, at the confluence with the small Blau Stream, coming from the Blautopf in the west. The mouth of the Iller also falls within Ulm's city limits. The Danube forms the border with Bavaria, where Ulm's twin city Neu-Ulm lies. The city was part of Ulm until 1810, and Ulm and Neu-Ulm have a combined population of around 190000. Ulm forms an urban district of its own (Stadtkreis Ulm), and is the administrative seat of the Alb-Donau-Kreis, the district that surrounds it on three sides, but which the city itself is not a part of. Ulm is the overall 11th-largest city on the river Danube, and the third-largest German Danubian city after Regensburg and Ingolstadt.

Founded around 850, Ulm is rich in history and traditions as a former free imperial city. Ulm is an economic centre due to its varied industries, and is the seat of the University of Ulm (Universität Ulm), and of the Ulm University of Applied Sciences (Technische Hochschule Ulm, THU). The city lies on the international railway corridor "Main Line for Europe", from Paris to Bratislava and Budapest, via Strasbourg, Karlsruhe, Stuttgart, Ulm, Augsburg, Munich, Salzburg, Linz and Vienna. The Ulm Minster (Ulmer Münster) is the second tallest church in the world (161.53 m or 529.95 ft).

In 1927, the then tiny village of Wiblingen was incorporated into Ulm, which led to that Wiblingen Abbey with its monastic library and its True Cross reliquary (Heilig-Kreuz-Reliquie), that allegedly contains wood particles from the True Cross, is now part of Ulm.

Famous personalities born in Ulm include Johann Georg Niederegger (1777–1859), Karl Heinrich Kässbohrer (1864–1922), Albert Einstein (1879–1955), Otto Kässbohrer (1904–1989), Hildegard Knef (1925–2002) and Ursula Karven (b.1964).

== Geography ==
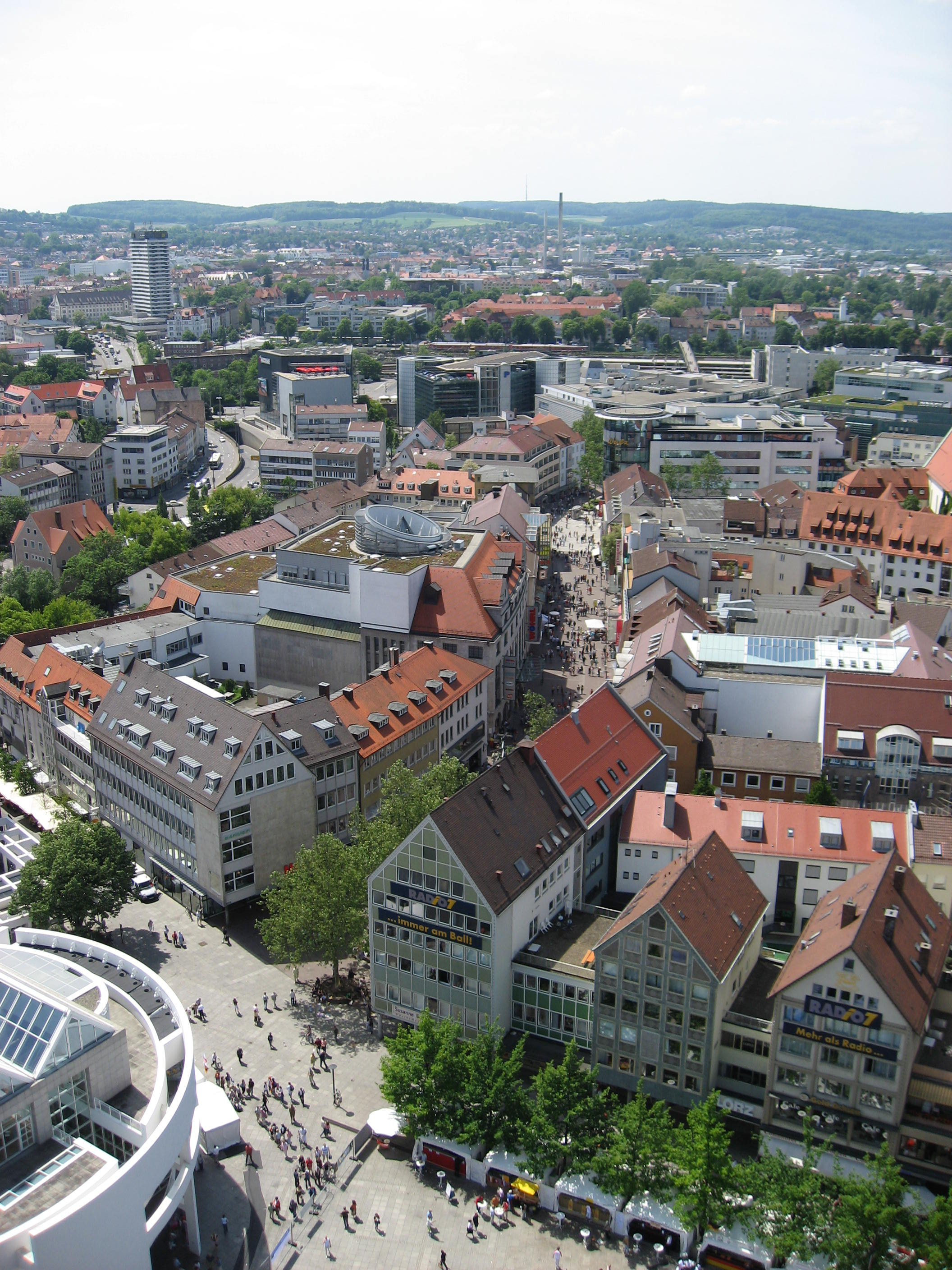
View from Ulm Minster towards Hirschstraße

Ulm lies at the point where the rivers Blau and Iller join the Danube, at an altitude of 479 m (1,571.52 ft) above sea level. Most parts of the city, including the old town, are situated on the northern bank of the Danube; only the districts of Wiblingen, Gögglingen, Donaustetten and Unterweiler lie on the southern bank. Across from the old town, on the other side of the river, lies the twin city of Neu-Ulm in the state of Bavaria, smaller than Ulm and, until 1810, a part of it (population c. 50,000).

Except for the Danube in the south, the city is surrounded by forests and hills which rise to altitudes of over 620 metres (2,034.12 feet), some of them part of the Swabian Alb. South of the Danube, plains and hills finally end in the northern edge of the Alps, which are approximately 100 kilometres (62 miles) from Ulm and are visible from the city on clear days.

The city of Ulm is situated in the northern part of the North Alpine Foreland basin, where the basin reaches the Swabian Alb. The Turritellenplatte of Ermingen ("Erminger Turritellenplatte") is a famous palaeontological site of Burdigalian age.

== Neighboring communes ==
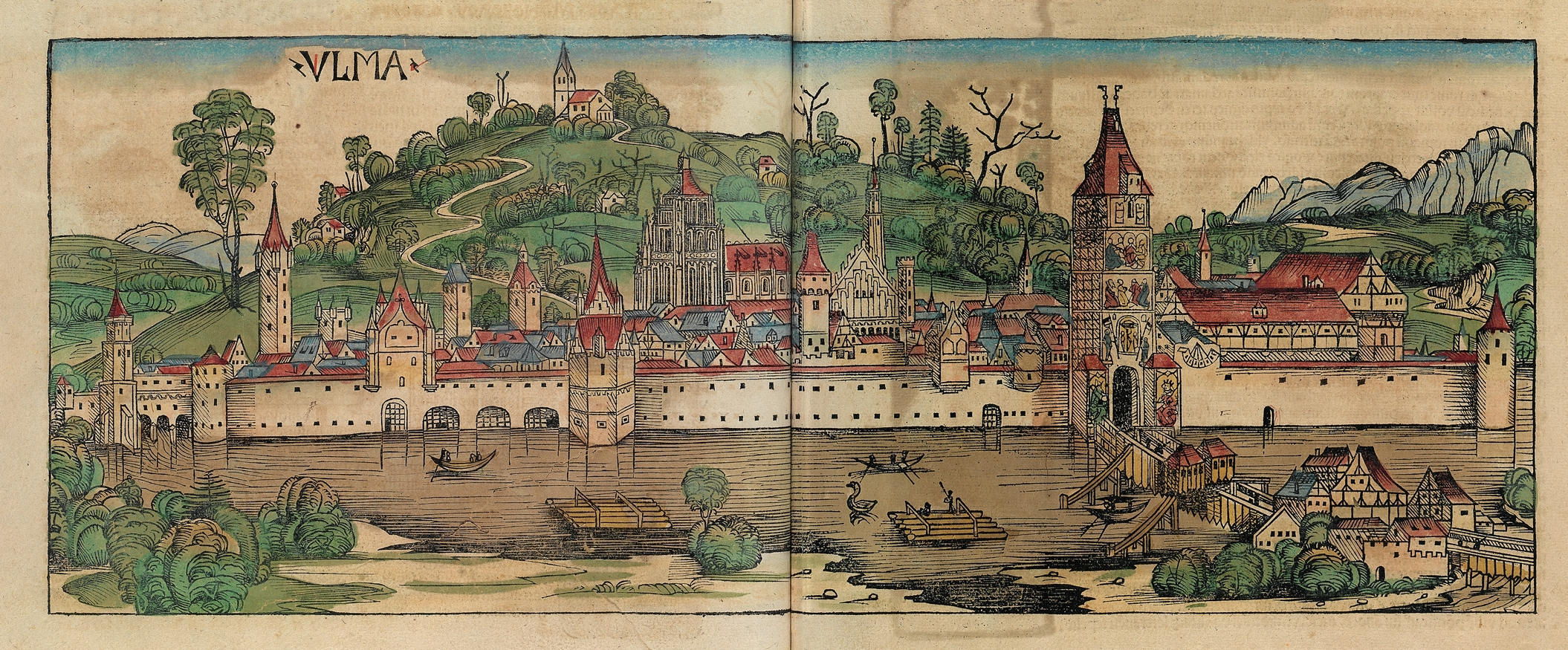
Ulm in the 1493 Nuremberg Chronicle

On the right (south-eastern) side of Danube and Iller there is the Bavarian district town Neu-Ulm. On the left (north-western) side Ulm is almost completely surrounded by the Alb-Danube district. The neighbouring communes of Baden-Württemberg are the following: Illerkirchberg, Staig, Hüttisheim, Erbach (Donau), Blaubeuren, Blaustein, Dornstadt, Beimerstetten and Langenau as well as the eastern neighbouring community Elchingen.

== Town subdivisions ==
The city is divided into 18 districts:

Ulm-Mitte, Böfingen, Donaustetten, Donautal, Eggingen, Einsingen, Ermingen, Eselsberg, Gögglingen, Grimmelfingen, Jungingen, Lehr, Mähringen, Oststadt, Söflingen (with Harthausen), Unterweiler, Weststadt, and Wiblingen.

Nine districts were integrated during the latest municipality reform in the 1970s: Eggingen, Einsingen, Ermingen, Gögglingen-Donaustetten, Jungingen, Lehr, Mähringen und Unterweiler. They have their own local councils which acquire an important consulting position to the whole city council concerning issues that are related to the prevailing districts. But at the end, final decisions can only be made by the city council of the entire city of Ulm.

== History ==
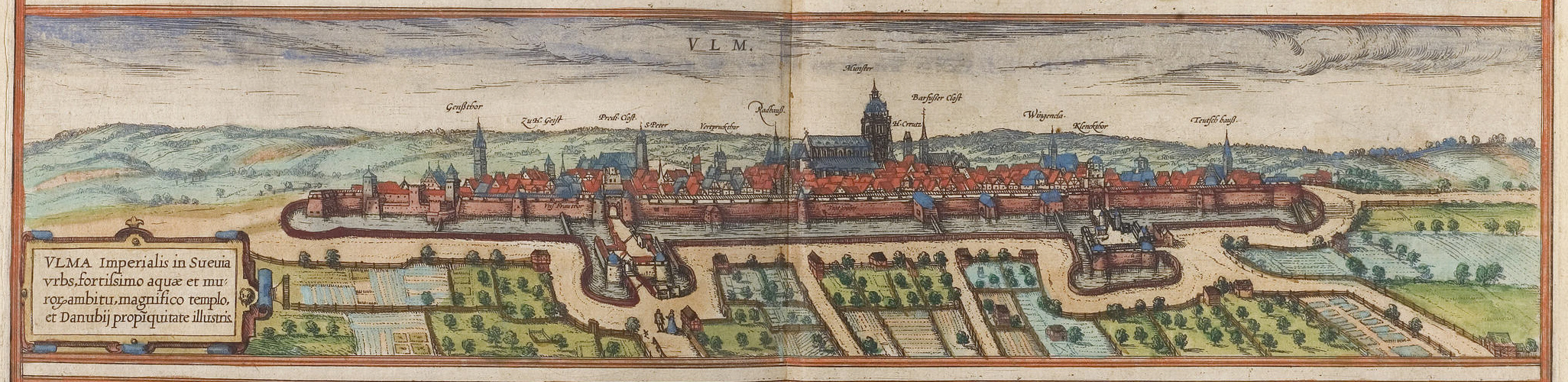
Ulm in 1572 by Frans Hogenberg

The oldest traceable settlement of the Ulm area began in the early Neolithic period, around 5000 BC. Settlements of this time have been identified at the villages of Eggingen and Lehr, today districts of the city. In the city area of Ulm proper, the oldest find dates from the late Neolithic period. The earliest written mention of Ulm is dated 22 July 854 AD, when King Louis the German signed a document in the King's palace of "Hulma" in the Duchy of Swabia. The city was declared an Imperial City (German: Reichsstadt) by Friedrich Barbarossa in 1181.

At first, Ulm's significance was due to the privilege of a Königspfalz, a place of accommodation for the medieval German kings and emperors on their frequent travels. Later, Ulm became a city of traders and craftsmen. One of the most important legal documents of the city, an agreement between the Ulm patricians and the trade guilds (German: Großer Schwörbrief), dates from 1397. This document, considered an early city constitution, and the beginning of the construction of an enormous church (Ulm Minster, 1377), financed by the inhabitants of Ulm themselves rather than by the church, demonstrate the assertiveness of Ulm's medieval citizens. Ulm blossomed during the 15th and 16th centuries, mostly due to the export of high-quality textiles. The city was situated at the crossroads of important trade routes extending to Italy. These centuries, during which many important buildings were erected, also represented the zenith of art in Ulm, especially for painters and sculptors like Hans Multscher and Jörg Syrlin the Elder. During the Reformation, Ulm became Protestant (1530). With the establishment of new trade routes following the discovery of the New World (16th century) and the outbreak and consequences of the Thirty Years' War (1618–1648), the city began to decline gradually. During the War of the Spanish Succession (1701–1714), it was alternately invaded several times by French and Bavarian soldiers.

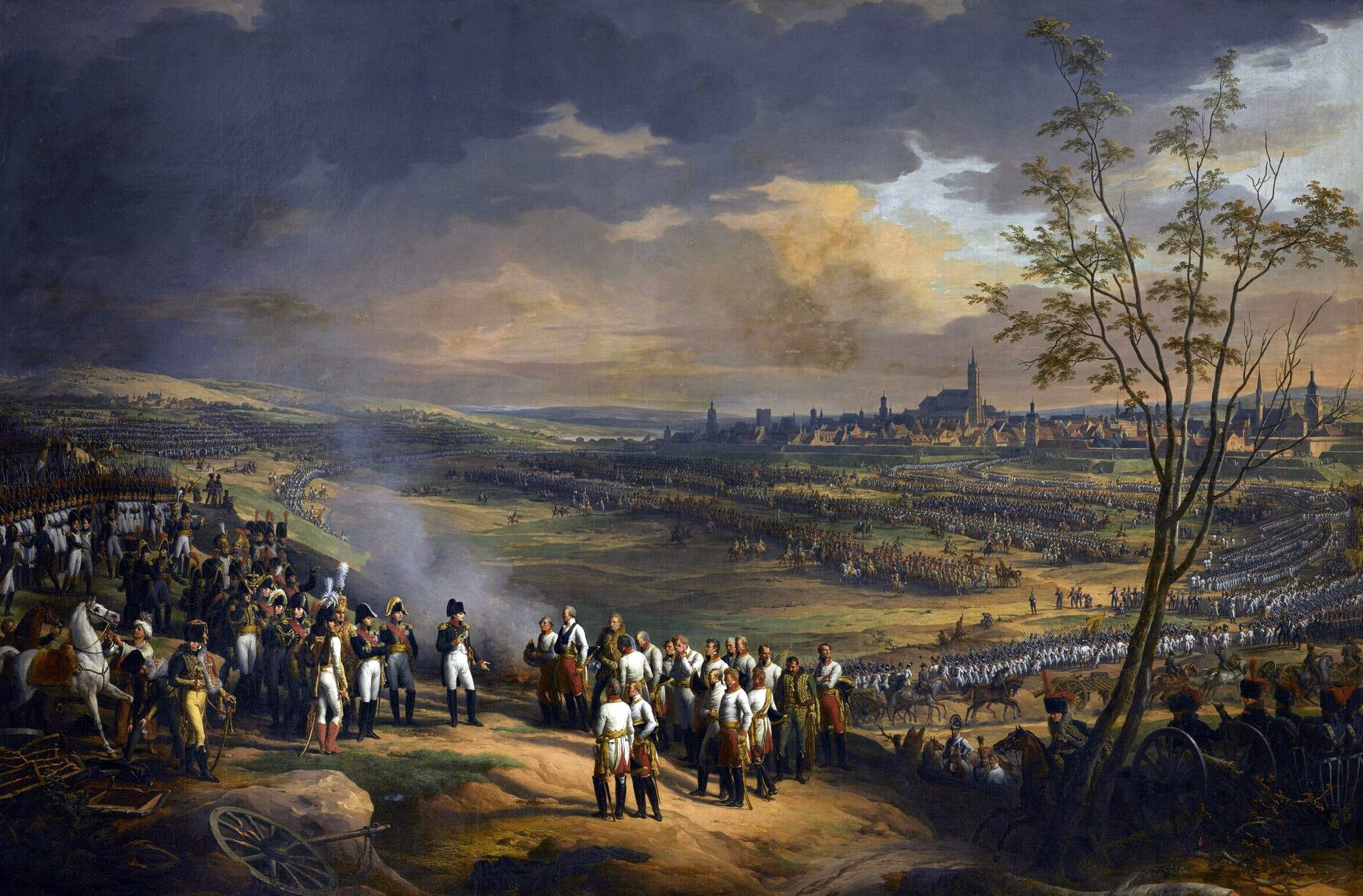
The capitulation of Ulm. General Mack and 23,000 Austrian troops surrendered to Napoleon.

In the wars following the French Revolution, the city was alternately occupied by French and Austrian forces, with the former ones destroying the city fortifications. In 1803, it lost the status of Imperial City and was absorbed into Bavaria. During the campaign of 1805, Napoleon managed to trap the invading Austrian army of General Mack and forced it to surrender in the Battle of Ulm. In 1810, Ulm was incorporated into the Kingdom of Württemberg and lost its districts on the other bank of the Danube, which came to be known as Neu-Ulm (New Ulm).

In the mid-19th century, the city was designated a fortress of the German Confederation with huge military construction works directed primarily against the threat of a French invasion. The city became an important centre of industrialisation in southern Germany in the second half of the 19th century, its built-up area now being extended beyond the medieval walls. The construction of the huge minster, which had been interrupted in the 16th century for economic reasons, was resumed and eventually finished (1844–1891) in a wave of German national enthusiasm for the Middle Ages.

From 1933 to 1935, a concentration camp primarily for political opponents of the regime was established on the Kuhberg, one of the hills surrounding Ulm. The Jews of Ulm, around 500 people, were first discriminated against and later persecuted; their synagogue was torn down during Kristallnacht in November 1938. Of 116 Jews deported from Ulm during World War II (45 were sent to Theresienstadt on 22 August 1942), only four returned. Approximately 25 Jews were living in Ulm in 1968.

The sole RAF strategic bombing during World War II against Ulm occurred on 17 December 1944, against the two large lorry factories of Magirus-Deutz and Kässbohrer, as well as other industries, barracks, and depots in Ulm. The Gallwitz Barracks and several military hospitals were among 14 Wehrmacht establishments destroyed. The raid killed 707 Ulm inhabitants and left 25,000 homeless and after all the bombings, over 80% of the medieval city centre lay in ruins. The Magirus factory hosted a subcamp of the Dachau concentration camp.

Some parts of the city were rebuilt in the plain and simple style of the 1950s and 1960s, but most parts of the historic old town have been restored. Due to its almost complete destruction in 1944, the Hirschstraße part of the city primarily consists of modern architecture. Ulm experienced substantial growth in the decades following World War II, with the establishment of large new housing projects and new industrial zones. In 1967, Ulm University was founded, which proved to be of great importance for the development of the city. Particularly since the 1980s, the transition from classical industry towards the high-tech sector has accelerated, with, for example, the establishment of research centres of companies like Daimler, Siemens and Nokia and a number of small applied research institutes near the university campus. The city today is still growing, forming a twin city of 170,000 inhabitants together with its neighbouring Bavarian city of Neu-Ulm, and seems to benefit from its central position between the cities of Stuttgart and Munich and thus between the cultural and economic hubs of southern Germany.

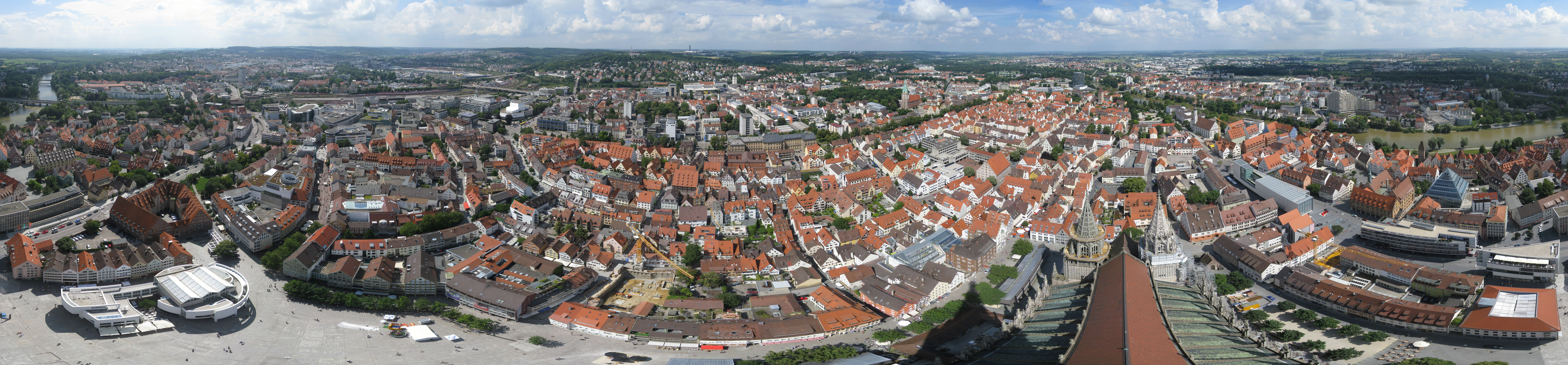
Panorama of Ulm from the Ulm Minster

Significant minority groups
Nationality	Population (2018)
Turkey	4,782
Italy	2,009
Croatia	1,557
Bosnia & Herzegovina	1,532
Romania	1,319
Kosovo	959
Syria	823
Serbia	783
Hungary	740
Iraq	678
Poland	626

== Demographics ==
Historical population
Year	Pop.	±%
1300	4,000	—
1400	9,000	+125.0%
1550	19,000	+111.1%
1750	15,000	−21.1%
1818	13,000	−13.3%
1871	26,290	+102.2%
1900	42,982	+63.5%
1910	56,109	+30.5%
1919	56,020	−0.2%
1925	57,278	+2.2%
1933	62,472	+9.1%
1939	75,503	+20.9%
1946	58,087	−23.1%
1950	71,132	+22.5%
1956	90,530	+27.3%
1961	92,705	+2.4%
1970	92,943	+0.3%
1987	103,494	+11.4%
2011	117,541	+13.6%
2017	125,596	+6.9%
2018	125,805	+0.2%
2019	126,329	+0.4%
Population size may be affected by changes in administrative divisions. source:

== Climate ==
Ulm has a humid continental climate (Köppen: Dfb; Trewartha: Dcbo). Compared with the plains, the temperature fluctuates greatly, with the average temperature ranging from −1 °C (30 °F) in winter to 18 °C (64 °F) in summer, and precipitation is concentrated from May to August.

The Lübeck weather station has recorded the following extreme values:

- Highest Temperature 37.4 °C (99.3 °F) on 27 July 1983.
- Warmest Minimum 20.6 °C (69.1 °F) on 1 July 1950.
- Coldest Maximum −16.8 °C (1.8 °F) on 7 January 1985.
- Lowest Temperature −25.5 °C (−13.9 °F) on 10 February 1956.
- Highest Daily Precipitation 77.9 mm (3.07 in) on 2 July 1956.
- Wettest Month 237.5 mm (9.35 in) in July 1956.
- Wettest Year 928.1 mm (36.54 in) in 2002.
- Driest Year 501.4 mm (19.74 in) in 1949.
- Longest annual sunshine: 2,211.5 hours in 2022.
- Shortest annual sunshine: 1,401.5 hours in 1995.

Climate data for Ulm (1991–2020 normals, extremes 1944–present (Note: Temperature data for Ulm have been recorded since 1944. The weather station data used from 1 January 1944 to 31 August 2014 came from Ulm weather station, and temperature data from 1 September 2014 to the present are from Mähringen.))
Month	Jan	Feb	Mar	Apr	May	Jun	Jul	Aug	Sep	Oct	Nov	Dec	Year
Record high °C (°F)	16.0 (60.8)	19.6 (67.3)	24.3 (75.7)	29.7 (85.5)	29.9 (85.8)	33.8 (92.8)	37.4 (99.3)	35.4 (95.7)	31.5 (88.7)	27.3 (81.1)	19.6 (67.3)	15.1 (59.2)	37.4 (99.3)
Mean maximum °C (°F)	10.0 (50.0)	12.8 (55.0)	18.0 (64.4)	22.8 (73.0)	26.5 (79.7)	29.7 (85.5)	31.3 (88.3)	30.8 (87.4)	26.0 (78.8)	21.2 (70.2)	14.5 (58.1)	10.6 (51.1)	32.4 (90.3)
Mean daily maximum °C (°F)	1.9 (35.4)	3.8 (38.8)	8.9 (48.0)	13.7 (56.7)	18.2 (64.8)	21.4 (70.5)	23.3 (73.9)	23.2 (73.8)	18.2 (64.8)	12.5 (54.5)	6.1 (43.0)	2.3 (36.1)	12.7 (54.9)
Daily mean °C (°F)	−0.6 (30.9)	0.3 (32.5)	4.5 (40.1)	8.8 (47.8)	13.2 (55.8)	16.4 (61.5)	18.2 (64.8)	17.9 (64.2)	13.5 (56.3)	8.6 (47.5)	3.4 (38.1)	0.0 (32.0)	8.6 (47.5)
Mean daily minimum °C (°F)	−3.0 (26.6)	−2.8 (27.0)	0.6 (33.1)	4.1 (39.4)	8.2 (46.8)	11.4 (52.5)	13.2 (55.8)	12.9 (55.2)	9.2 (48.6)	5.3 (41.5)	1.0 (33.8)	−2.2 (28.0)	4.8 (40.6)
Mean minimum °C (°F)	−11.0 (12.2)	−10.4 (13.3)	−5.7 (21.7)	−2.4 (27.7)	2.0 (35.6)	5.6 (42.1)	7.9 (46.2)	7.3 (45.1)	3.3 (37.9)	−1.0 (30.2)	−5.0 (23.0)	−10.0 (14.0)	−14.2 (6.4)
Record low °C (°F)	−24.6 (−12.3)	−25.5 (−13.9)	−17.5 (0.5)	−8.2 (17.2)	−2.8 (27.0)	0.4 (32.7)	4.0 (39.2)	3.0 (37.4)	−1.0 (30.2)	−6.6 (20.1)	−14.2 (6.4)	−20.2 (−4.4)	−25.5 (−13.9)
Average precipitation mm (inches)	42.9 (1.69)	35.3 (1.39)	47.5 (1.87)	45.5 (1.79)	81.2 (3.20)	82.7 (3.26)	88.6 (3.49)	85.1 (3.35)	58.2 (2.29)	57.5 (2.26)	50.9 (2.00)	57.6 (2.27)	731.5 (28.80)
Average extreme snow depth cm (inches)	10.9 (4.3)	11.0 (4.3)	4.6 (1.8)	1.9 (0.7)	0 (0)	0 (0)	0 (0)	0 (0)	0.1 (0.0)	0.3 (0.1)	2.8 (1.1)	8.6 (3.4)	17.2 (6.8)
Average precipitation days (≥ 1.0 mm)	15.3	14.1	15.0	13.8	15.8	15.4	15.8	14.4	13.7	16.2	15.8	17.9	182.9
Average relative humidity (%)	89.7	84.4	76.3	70.0	71.3	71.8	71.9	72.9	79.5	87.1	91.0	91.2	79.8
Mean monthly sunshine hours	54.7	84.0	134.5	175.9	209.1	221.1	233.9	218.6	151.2	94.1	47.4	43.5	1,652.8
Source 1: World Meteorological Organization
Source 2: DWD Open Data

== Economy ==
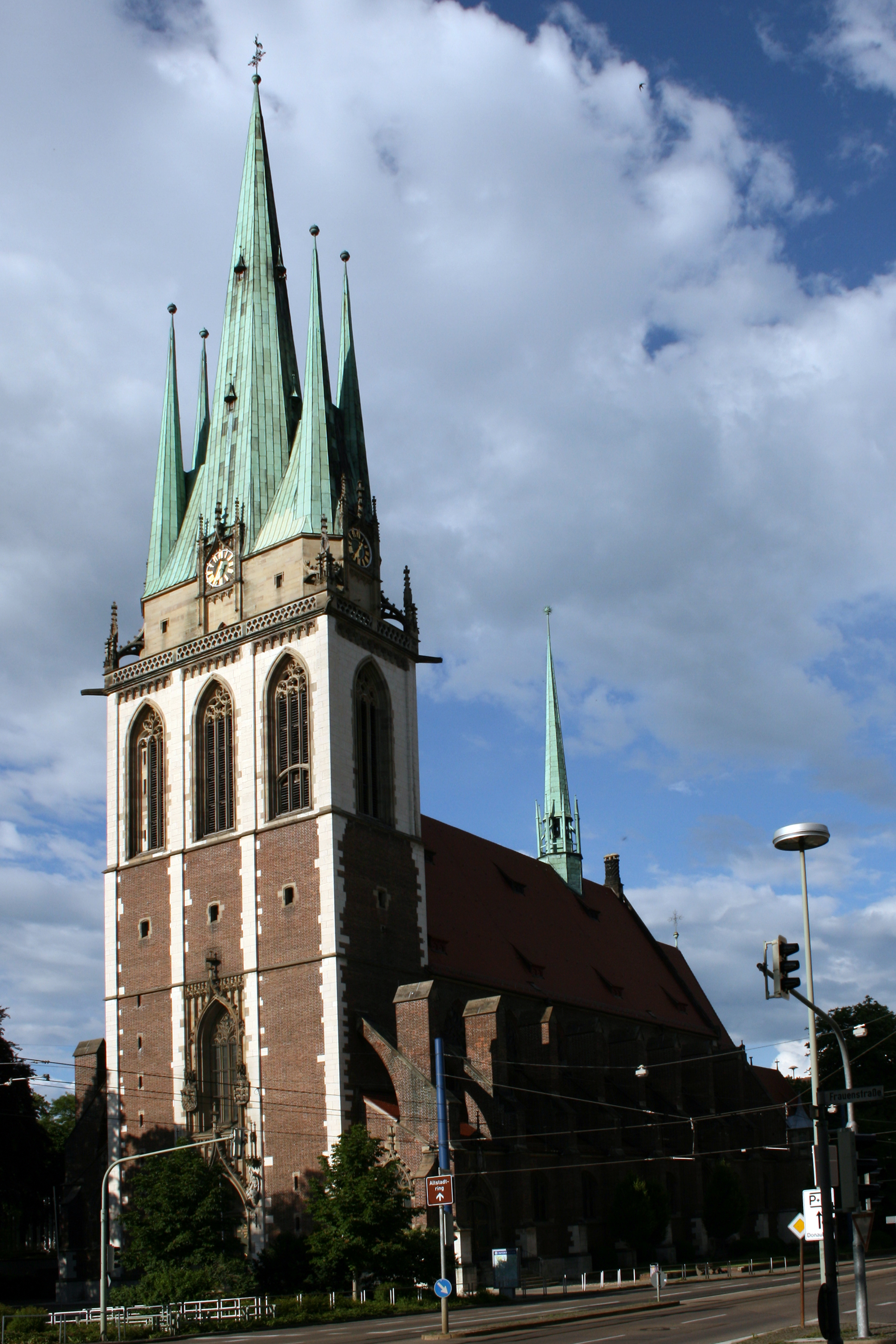
Saint George's Catholic church, Ulm

The city has very old trading traditions dating from medieval times and a long history of industrialisation, beginning with the establishment of a railway station in 1850. The most important sector is still classical industry (machinery, especially motor vehicles; electronics; pharmaceuticals). The establishment of the University of Ulm in 1967, which focuses on biomedicine, the sciences, and engineering, helped support a transition to high-tech industry, especially after the crisis of classical industries in the 1980s.

Companies with headquarters in Ulm include:

- Britax (child safety products) European headquarters in nearby Leipheim
- Ebner & Spiegel (book printing)
- Gardena (gardening tools)
- Krieghoff (weapons for hunting and sports since 1886)
- Iveco Magirus
- J. G. Anschütz (firearms for sports and hunting)
- Liqui Moly (additives, oils, car care products)
- Müller (major German trade company)
- Ratiopharm (pharmaceuticals)
- Seeberger (dried fruits, coffee, tea)
- Uzin Utz (construction materials)
- Walther Arms (firearms, especially pistols)
- Wieland Group (non-ferrous semi-finished products)
- Zwick Roell Group www.zwick.de (Materials Testing Machines)

Companies with important sites in Ulm include:

- AEG
- Atmel
- BMW Car IT
- Continental
- Daimler: Daimler Forschungszentrum (research centre) and Daimler TSS (car IT specialist)
- Deutsche Telekom
- Elektrobit Automotive
- EADS, European Aeronautic Defence and Space Company
- Nokia Networks
- Nuance Communications Speech Recognition (research departments)
- Siemens
- Harman International Industries

The Blautal-Center, which opened in 1997 as one of the largest shopping centres in southern Germany, largely ceased operations in 2024 and is planned to be redeveloped as the mixed-use Blau.Quartier.

== Ecology ==
In 2007 the City of Ulm was awarded the European Energy Award for its remarkable local energy management and its efforts to combat climate change. Examples of these efforts are a biomass power plant operated by the Fernwärme Ulm GmbH (10 MW electrical output), and the world's biggest passive house office building, the so-called Energon, located in the "Science City" near the university campus. Moreover, the city of Ulm boasts the second largest solar power production in Germany. For all new buildings, a strict energy standard (German KFW40 standard) has been mandatory since April 2008. Ulm Minster has been fully powered by renewables since January 2008. Until the end of 2011 as a European pilot project a self-sustaining data centre will be constructed in the west-city of Ulm. There is a solar-powered ferry that crosses the Danube 7 days a week in summer. The "Bündnis 100% Erneuerbare Energien" was founded in February 2010 with the aim of bringing together the people and organisations seeking to promote the transition to 100% renewable energy in Ulm and Neu-Ulm by 2030.

== Transportation ==
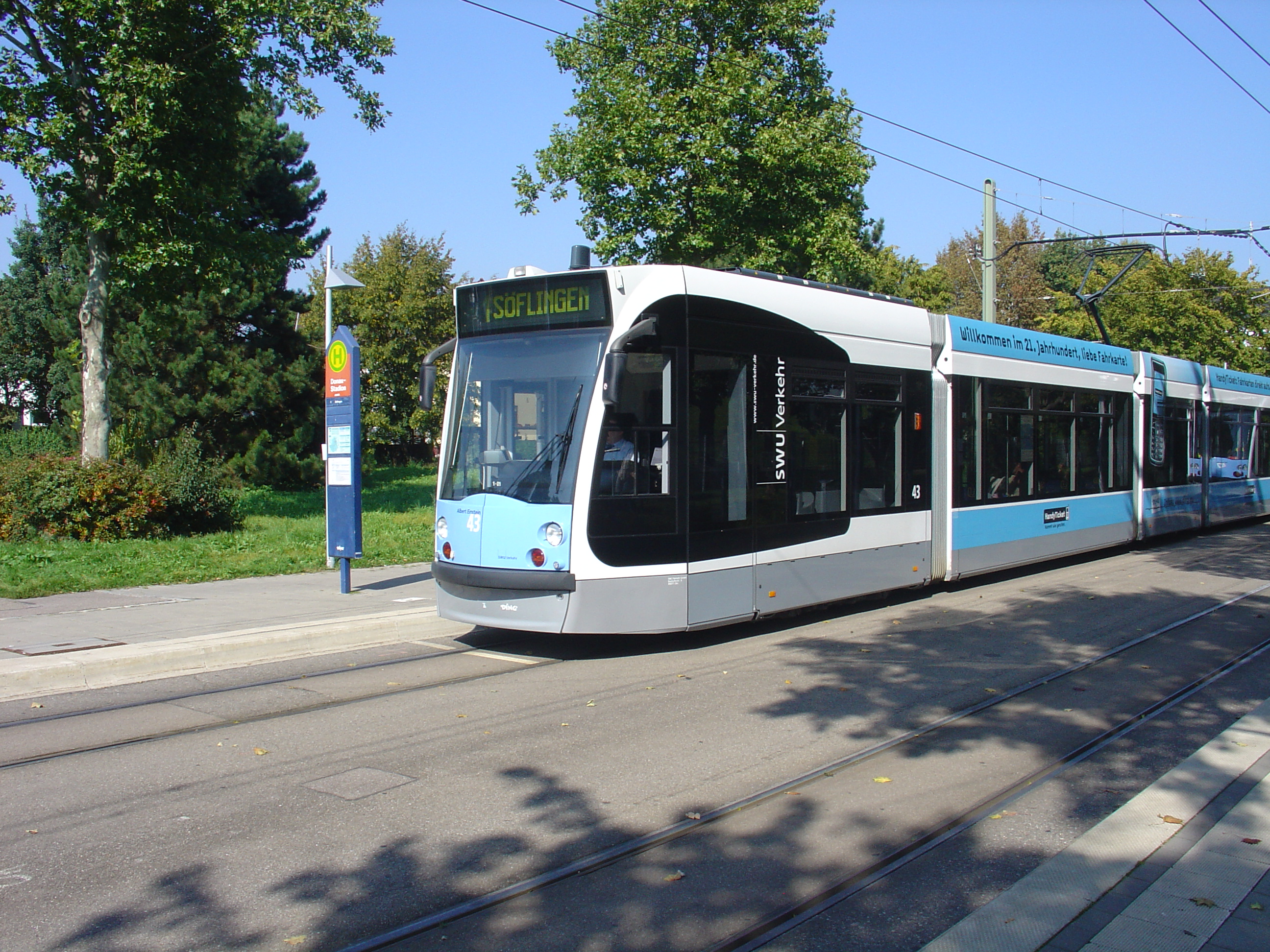
Tram in Ulm

Ulm is situated at the crossroads of the A8 motorway (connecting the principal cities of southern Germany, Stuttgart and Munich), and the A7 motorway (one of the motorways running from northern to southern Europe).

The city's railway station is served, among other lines, by one of the European train routes (Paris – Strasbourg – Stuttgart – Ulm – Munich – Vienna – Budapest). Direct connections to Berlin are also available.

Ulm's public transport system is based on several bus lines and two tram lines. Several streets in the old town are for the use of pedestrians and cyclists only. Ulm was the first area to be served by the Daimler AG's Car2Go carsharing service in 2008. However, the service in Ulm was discontinued at the end of 2014.

The nearest airports to Ulm are Memmingen Airport, located 60 km (37 mi) to the south and Stuttgart Airport, located 80 km (50 mi) to the north west. Munich Airport is also at a reasonable distance located 162 km (101 mi) east of Ulm.

== Education and culture ==
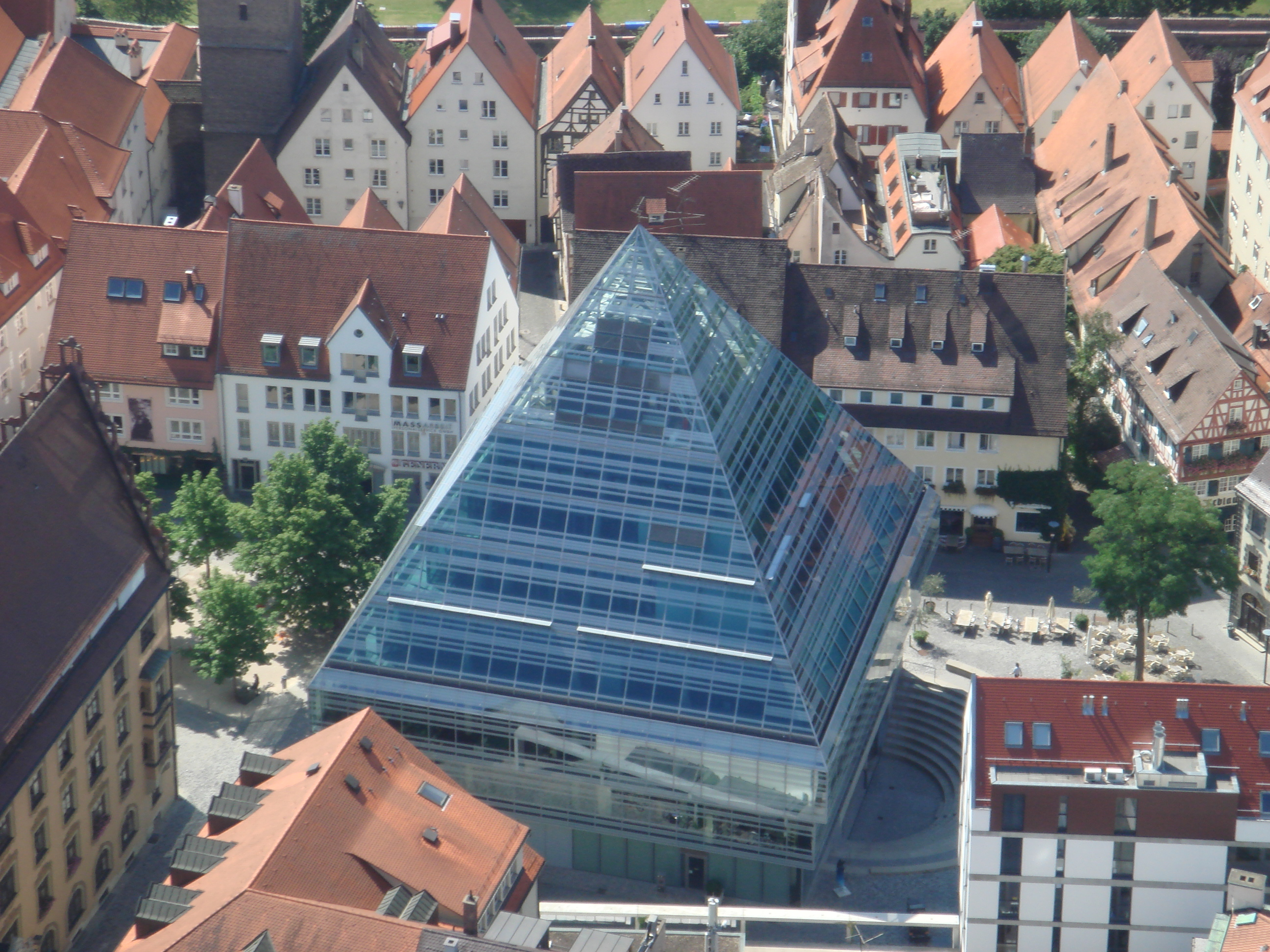
The Ulm Public Library

The University of Ulm was founded in 1967 and focuses on the sciences, medicine, engineering, and mathematics / economics. With about 10,000 students, it is one of the smaller universities in Germany.

Ulm is also the seat of the city's University of Applied Sciences (German: Fachhochschule), founded in 1960 as a public school of engineering. The school also houses numerous students from around the world as part of an international study abroad programme.

In 1953, Inge Aicher-Scholl, Otl Aicher and Max Bill founded the Ulm School of Design (German: Hochschule für Gestaltung – HfG Ulm), a design school in the tradition of the Bauhaus, which was, however, closed in 1968.

Ulm's public library features over 480,000 print media. The city has a public theatre with drama, opera and ballet, several small theatres, and a professional philharmonic orchestra.

== Sport ==
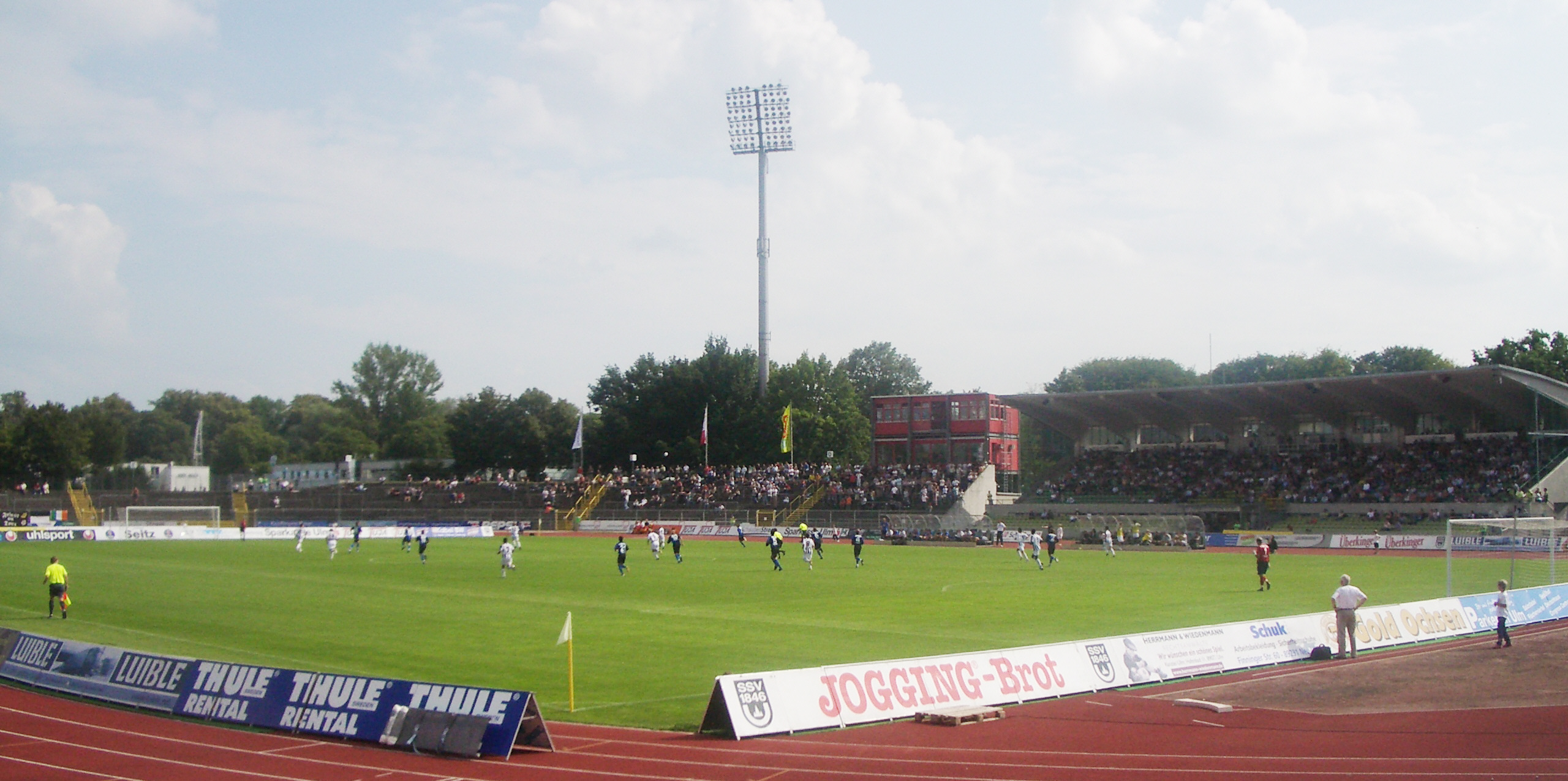
The Donaustadion is the stadium of football club SSV Ulm 1846.

- SSV Ulm 1846, multi-sports club, playing in the 3. Liga for football clubs
- Ratiopharm Ulm, basketball club, Basketball Bundesliga

Club	Founded	League	Sport	Venue	Capacity
SSV Ulm 1846	1846	3. Liga	Football	Donaustadion	19,500
Ratiopharm Ulm	2001	Basketball Bundesliga	Basketball	Ratiopharm arena	6,000

== Sights ==
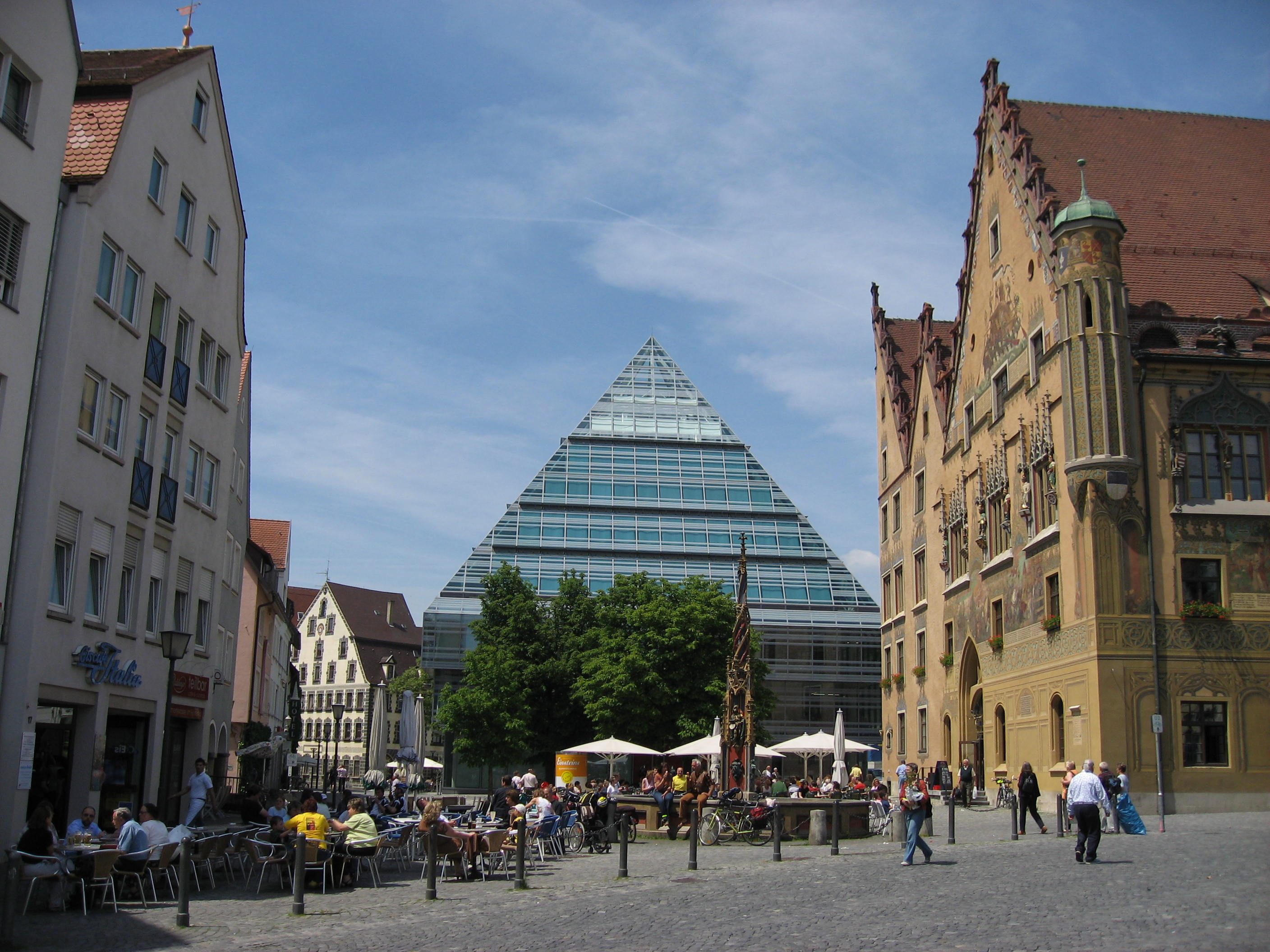
Ulm Marktplatz (market square) with town hall (right) and public library (center)

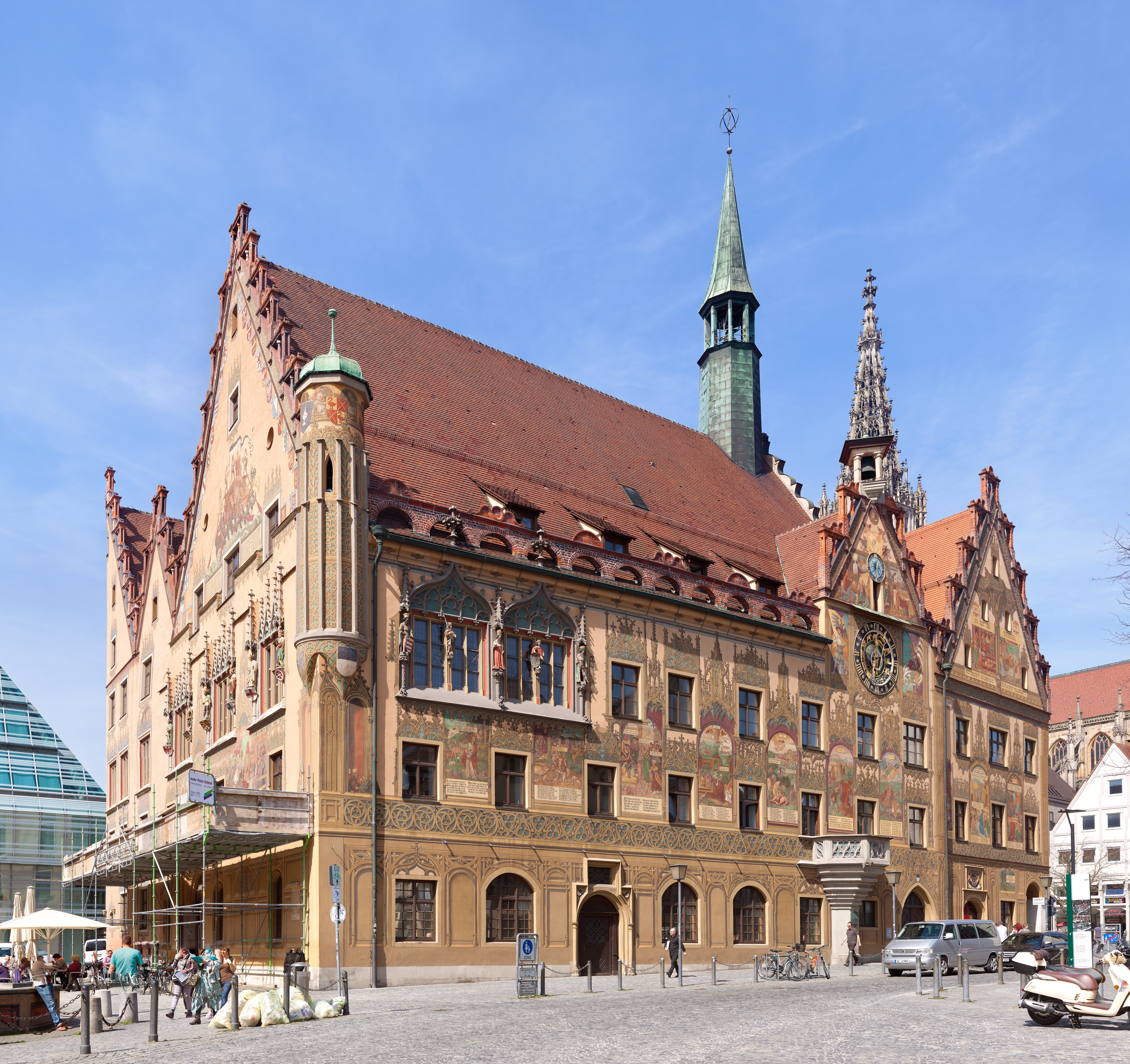
Town hall

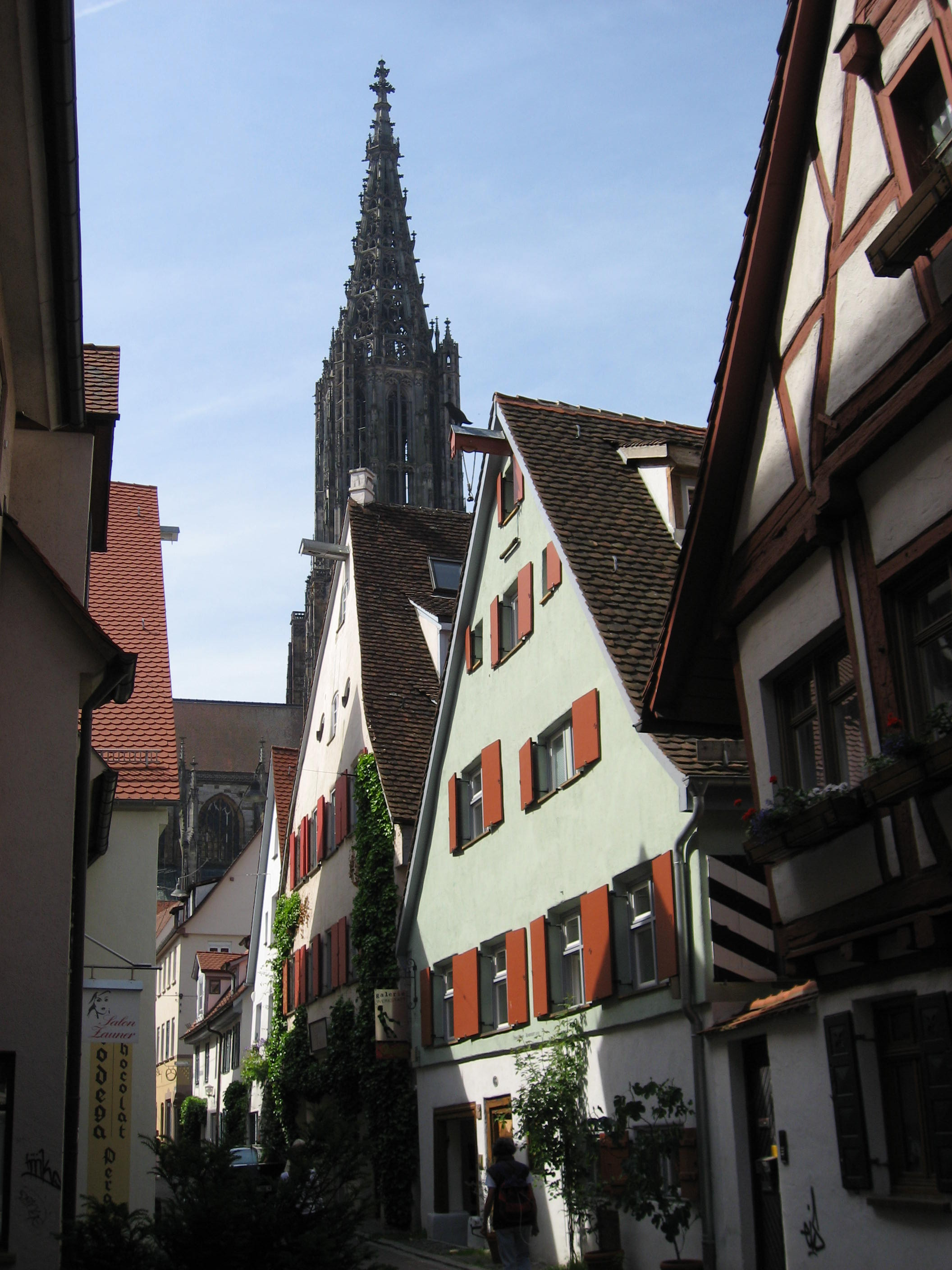
Ulm: View through Rabengasse towards the minster

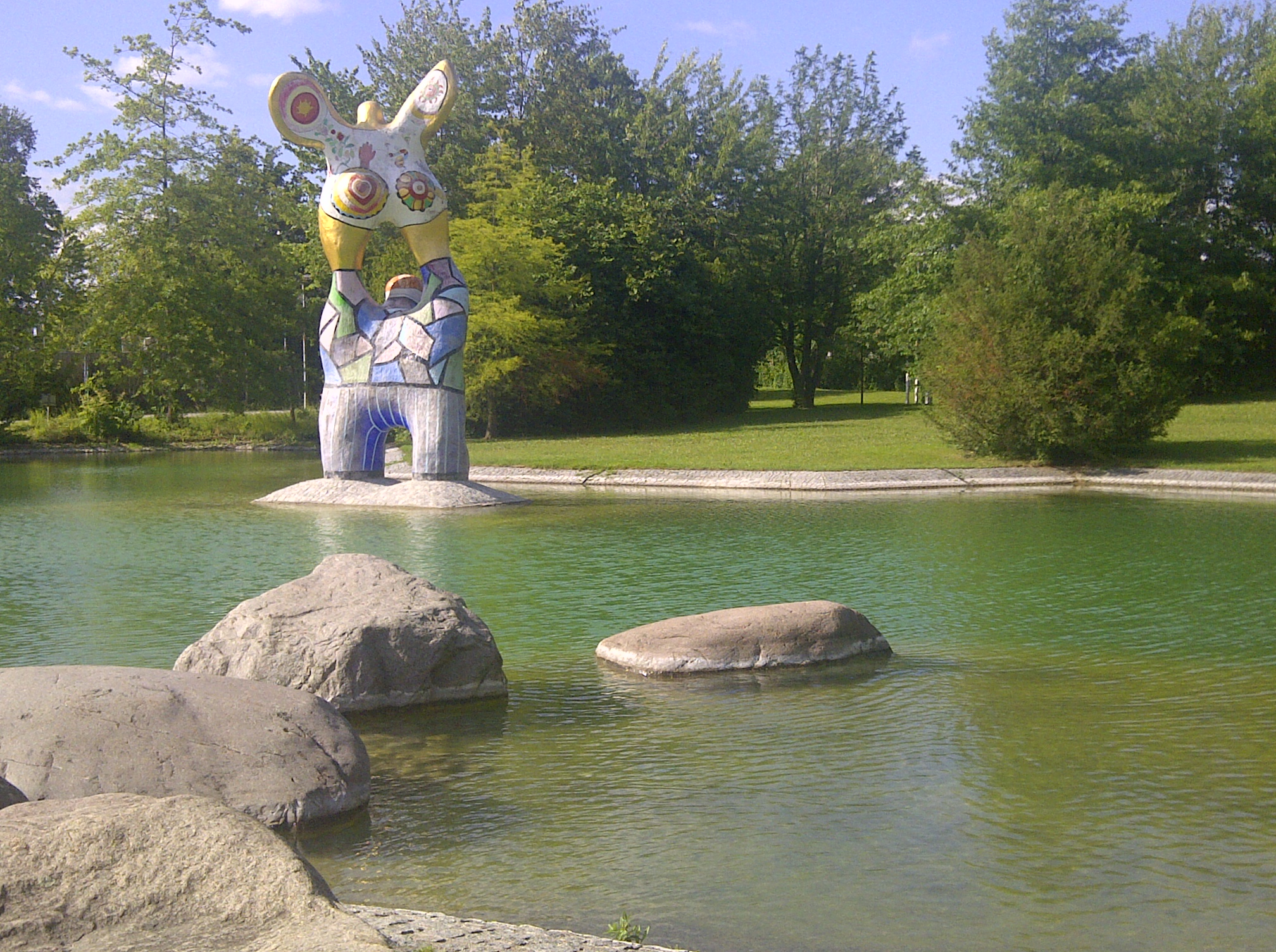
Sculpture by Niki de Saint Phalle (The poet and his muse) in front of Ulm University

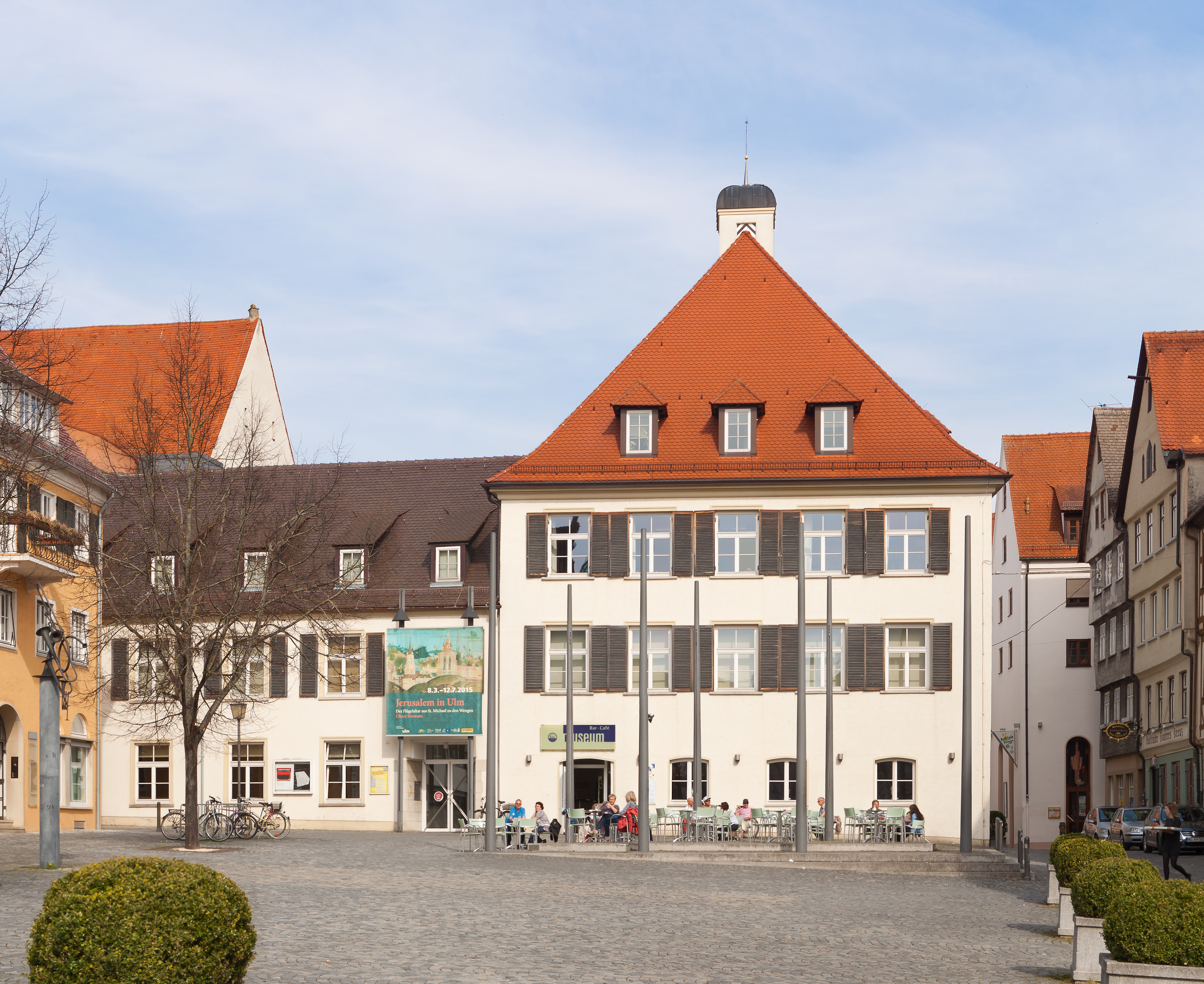
Museum Ulm, home of the Lion-man, oldest sculpture in the world

=== Historic ===
- Ulm Minster (German: Ulmer Münster, built 1377–1891) with the world's second highest church steeple (161.53 m (529.95 ft) high and 768 steps). Choir stalls by Jörg Syrlin the Elder (1469–1474), famous sculpture Schmerzensmann (Man of Sorrows) by Hans Multscher (1429).
- The old Fischerviertel (fishermen's quarter) on the River Blau, with half-timbered houses, cobblestone streets, and picturesque footbridges. Interesting sights here are the Schiefes Haus Ulm (crooked house), a 16th-century house today used as a hotel, and the Alte Münz (Old Mint), a mediaeval building extended in the 16th and 17th centuries in Renaissance style.
- The remaining section of the city walls, along the river, with the 14th-century Metzgerturm (butchers' tower) (36 m (118.11 ft) high).
- The Rathaus (Town Hall), built in 1370, featuring some brilliantly coloured murals dating from the mid-16th century. On the gable is an astronomical clock dating from 1520. Restored after serious damage in 1944.
- The Krone inn, a medieval complex of several houses (15th / 16th century, extensions from the 19th century), where German kings and emperors were accommodated during their travels.
- Several large buildings from the late Middle Ages / renaissance used for various purposes (especially storage of food and weapons), e.g. Schwörhaus, Kornhaus, Salzstadel, Büchsenstadel, Zeughaus, Neuer Bau.
- Ulm Federal Fortifications are the largest preserved fortifications and were built from 1842 to 1859 to protect from attacks by France.
- The historic district Auf dem Kreuz, a residential area with many buildings from before 1700.
- Wiblingen Abbey, a former Benedictine abbey in the suburb of Wiblingen in the south of Ulm. The church shows characteristics of late baroque and early classicism. Its library is a masterpiece of rococo.

=== Contemporary ===
- Building of the Ulm School of Design (German: Hochschule für Gestaltung – HfG Ulm), an important school of design (1953–1968) in the succession of the Bauhaus.
- Stadthaus, a house for public events built by Richard Meier, directly adjacent to the minster.
- Stadtbibliothek, the building of the public library of Ulm was erected by Gottfried Böhm in the form of a glass pyramid and is situated directly adjacent to the town hall.
- Kunsthalle Weishaupt is the highlight in Ulm's New Centre.

=== Museums ===
- The Kunsthalle Weishaupt, whose private collection shows modern art from 1945.
- Museum Ulm houses a significant collection of art and craftwork from the Middle Ages, the Löwenmensch figurine – a 40,000-year-old lion-headed figurine which is the oldest known human/animal shaped sculpture in the world – and various European and American art from the years after 1945. The museum has alternating exhibitions.
- The Museum of Bread Culture offers a permanent exhibition about the history of grain, baking, milling and bread culture.
- The exhibitions in the Danube Swabian Museum follow the varied history of the Danube Swabians (Donauschwaben) emigrants.

=== Memorials ===
- Albert Einstein Memorial – A small memorial at the site of the house where Albert Einstein was born in Bahnhofstraße, between the present-day newspaper offices and the bank. The house itself and the whole district were destroyed in the firebombing of 1944.
- Memorial to Hans and Sophie Scholl – A small memorial on the Münsterplatz in memory of these two members of the Weiße Rose (White Rose, a resistance group opposed to the Nazi regime), who spent their youth in Ulm. Their family's house near the memorial was destroyed in the firebombing of 1944.
- The Memorial to Deserters – Located near the university's botanical garden, it commemorates those who deserted from the Wehrmacht during World War II. It was originally erected on 9 September 1989, and was moved to its current location in July 2005. The Monument represents the idea: "Desertion is not reprehensible, war is".

=== Other landmarks ===
- The Botanischer Garten der Universität Ulm, the university's botanical garden
- Silo tower of the mill company Schapfenmühle (Schapfen Mill Tower)
- Sender Ulm-Ermingen, television and radio tower
- Medium wave transmission mast Ulm-Jungingen
- FM and TV mast Ulm-Kuhberg
- The Tiergarten Ulm, the zoo. It was opened in 1935, closed in 1944 and reopened in 1966.

== Notable people ==
=== Born in Ulm ===
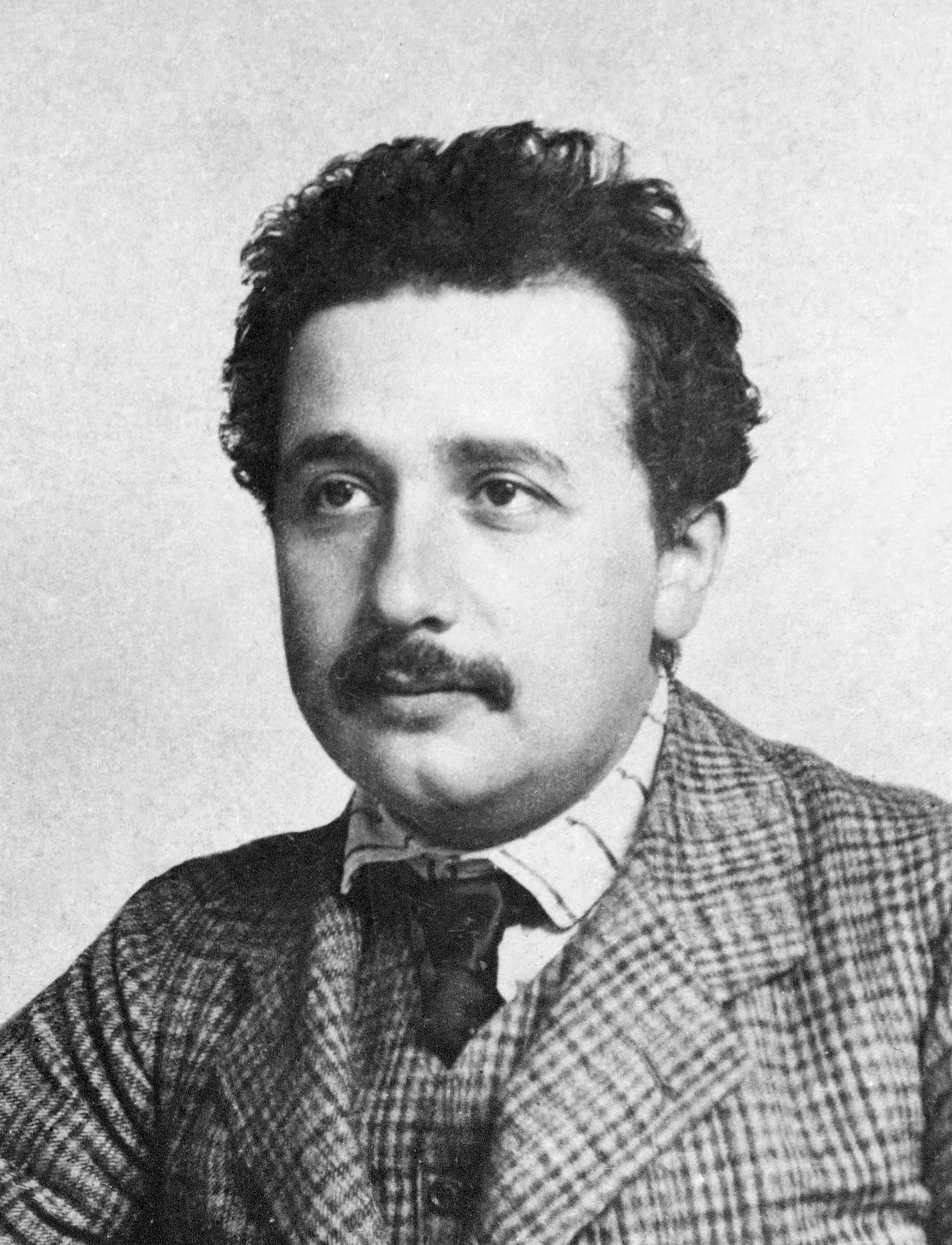
Albert Einstein, 1904, age 25

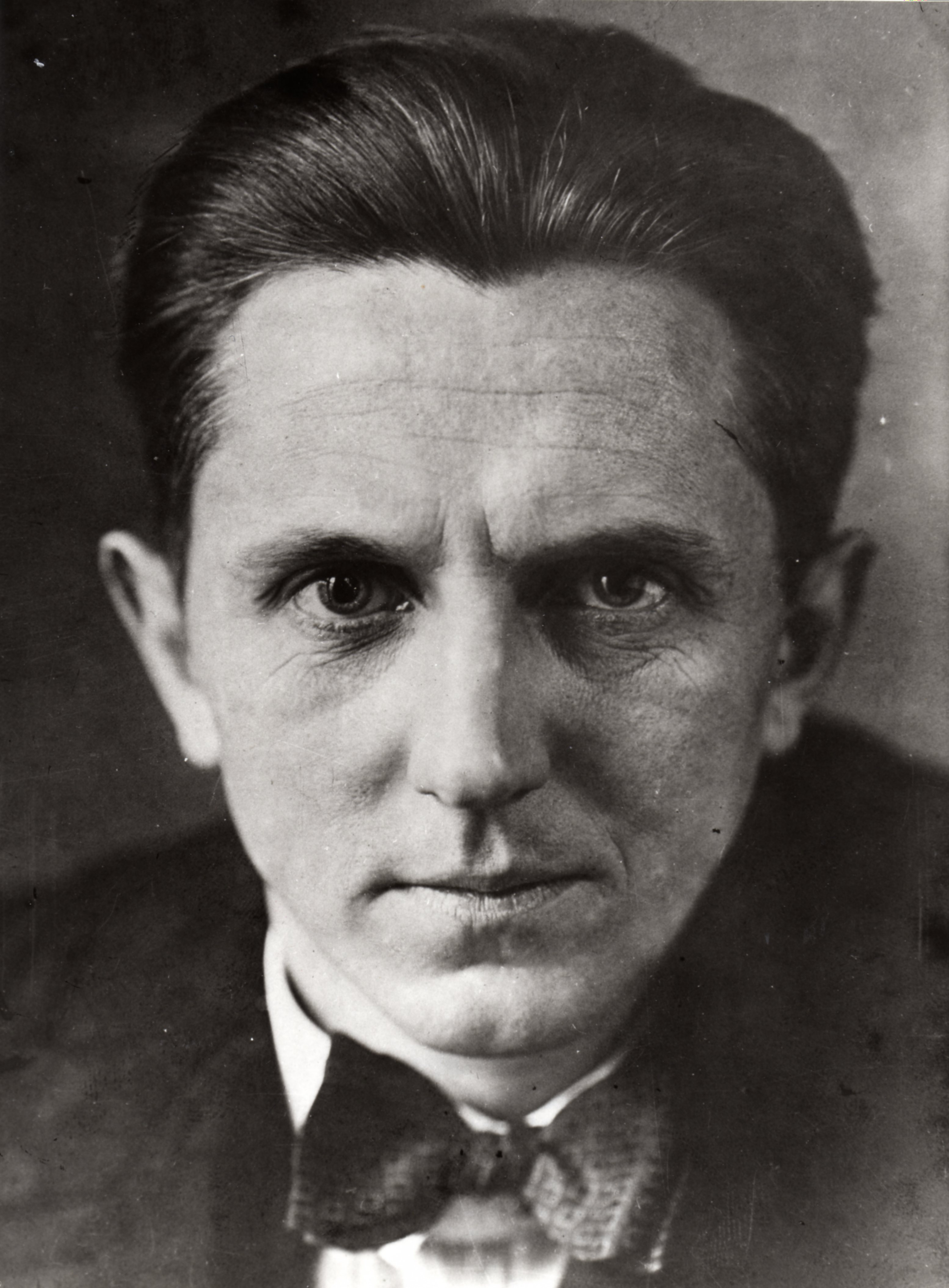
Erwin Piscator, c. 1929

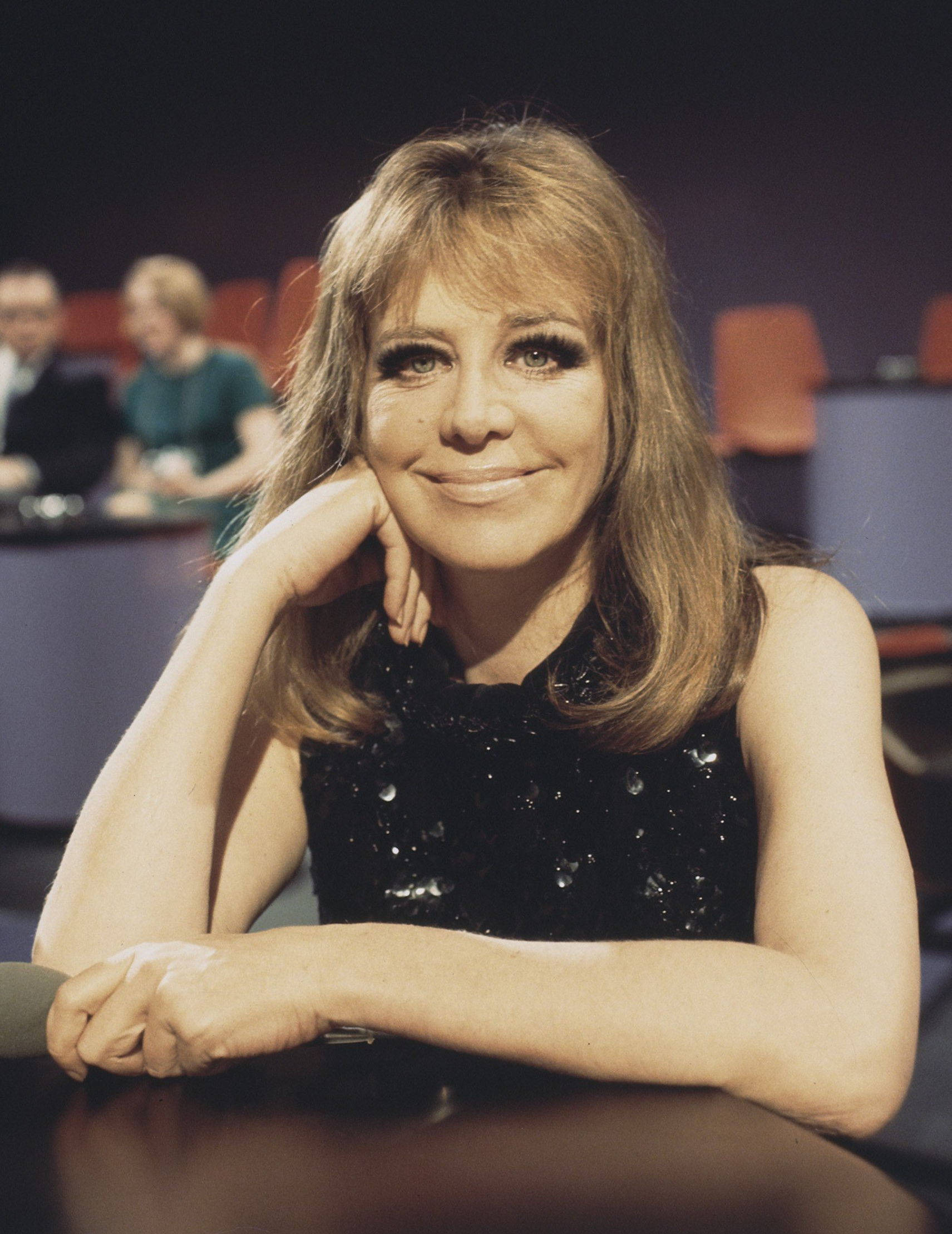
Hildegard Knef, 1969

- Jörg Syrlin the Elder (ca.1425–1491), sculptor of the carvings for the choir stalls of the Ulm Minster.
- Jerome Emser (1477–1527), a German theologian and antagonist of Luther.
- Hans Maler zu Schwaz (1480/1488 – 1526/1529), painter, active as portraitist at Schwaz near Innsbruck.
- Nikolaus Federmann (1505–1542), conquistador in today's Venezuela and Colombia, co-founder of Bogotá.
- Agatha Streicher (1520–1581), physician, referred to as the first female physician in Germany
- Johann Faulhaber (1580–1635), mathematician, inventor of Faulhaber's formula.
- Johann Freinsheim (1608–1660), a German classical scholar and critic.
- Johann Christoph Heilbronner (1706–1745) mathematical historian and theologian.
- Albrecht Berblinger (1770–1829), flight pioneer.
- Mathilde Planck (1861–1955), teacher, the first female member of the Landtag of Württemberg.
- Eugen Haile (1873–1933), composer, singer and accompanist.
- Albert Einstein (1879–1955), physicist, philosopher, scientist, Nobel Prize in Physics, 1921
- Anna Essinger (1879–1960) educator; co-founder and headmistress of Bunce Court School.
- Karl Kimmich (1880–1945), banker, chairman of Deutsche Bank, 1942 to 1945
- Erwin Piscator (1893–1966), theatre director and innovator.
- Robert Lusser (1899–1969), German engineer, aircraft designer and developed ski bindings
- Hellmuth Laegeler, (DE Wiki) (1902–1972), major general in the Wehrmacht.
- Otto Kässbohrer (1904–1989), entrepreneur and vehicle constructor.
- Leo Hepp (1907–1987), officer of the Wehrmacht and General of the Bundeswehr.
- Max Bentele (1909–2006), mechanical engineer, jet-engine pioneer, father of the Wankel rotary engine.
- Helmut Ensslin, (DE Wiki) (1909–1984), Protestant parson and father of RAF-member Gudrun Ensslin.
- Wilhelm Schuler (1914–2010), chemist, inventor and entrepreneur in the second half of the 20th century.
- Ernst Bauer, (DE Wiki) (1916–1991), resistance fighter and publisher.
- Fritz Hartnagel (1917–2001), officer and jurist, fiancé of Sophie Scholl.
- Peter Ury (1920–1976), Jewish composer, moved to England in 1939
- Otl Aicher (1922–1991), graphic designer, co-founder of Ulm School of Design, and creator of Rotis font.
- Franz Josef Müller (1924–2015), member of the WWII-era White Rose resistance group
- Hildegard Knef (1925–2002), actress, singer and writer.
- Otto Eckstein (1927–1984), economist, advisor to Lyndon B. Johnson, co-founder of Data Resources Inc.
- Annemarie Huste (1943–2016), chef to Jackie Kennedy, executive chef Gourmet Magazine, author of 6 cookbooks.
- Wolfgang Schuster (born 1949), politician (CDU), former Lord Mayor of Stuttgart, 1997 to 2013.
- Hellmut Hattler (born 1952), jazz and rock bass player (Kraan.)
- Claudia Roth (born 1955), politician, chairman of the German Green Party.
- Ursula Karven (born 1964), actress, writer, model and yoga instructor.
- Max Hattler (born 1976), artist and film-maker.
- Simone Schürle-Finke (born 1986), biomedical engineer, pioneer in magnetic servoing technologies.
- Katharina Sophia Volz (born 1987), a medical researcher, develops drugs for brain diseases and entrepreneur.
- Rudolf Rahn (1900–1975), a high ranking German diplomat and Plenipotentiary of the Italian Social Republic.
- Sam Rosen (born 1947), a German-born American sportscaster and Hockey Hall of Famer.

=== Sport ===
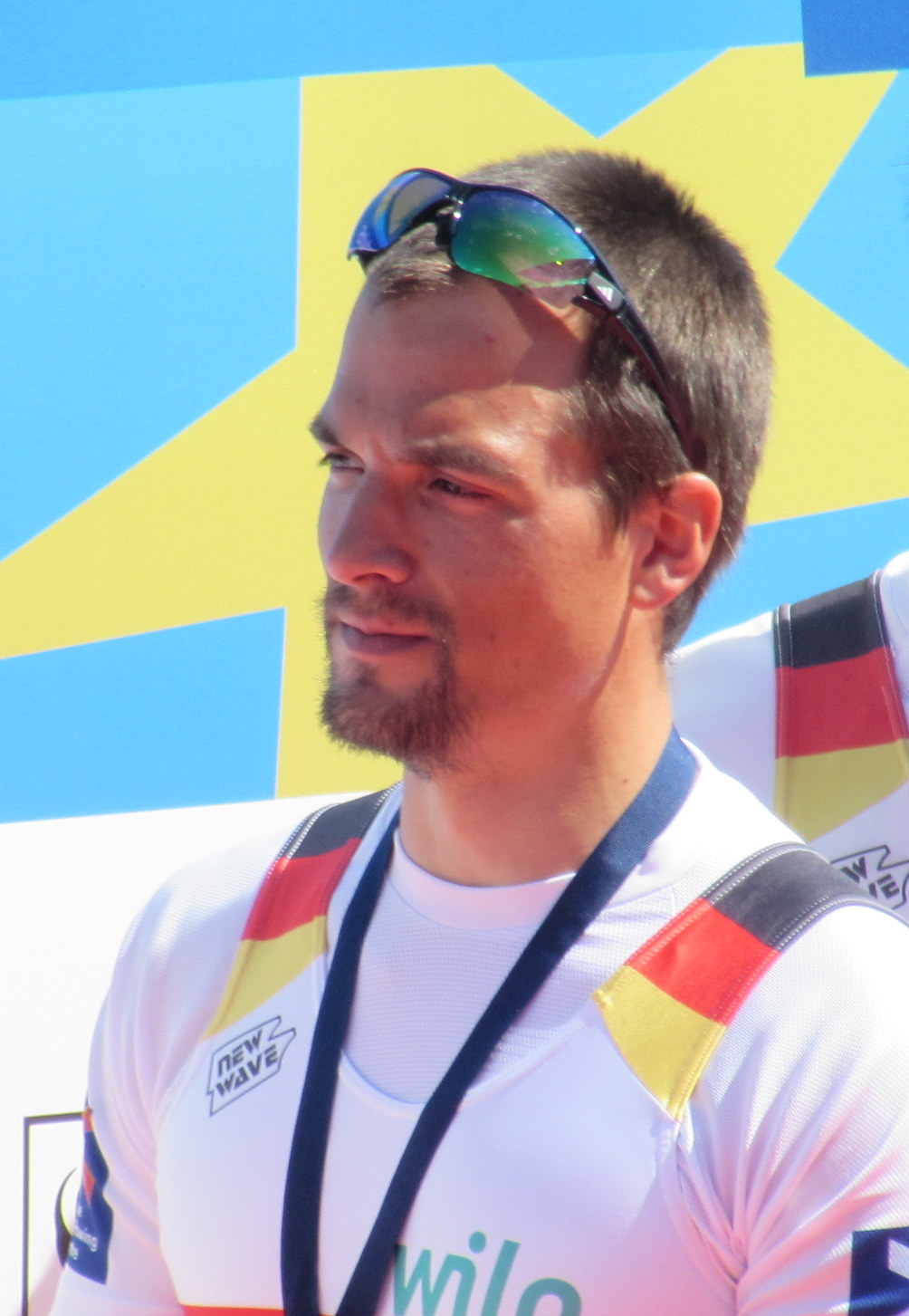
Maximilian Reinelt, 2016

- Hermann Duckek (1936–2001), riding master and Olympic equestrian arena designer.
- Dieter Braun (born 1943), Motorcycle Grand Prix racer.
- Uli Hoeneß (born 1952), former footballer, president of Bayern Munich FC, for whom he played 239 games
- Dieter Hoeneß (born 1953), former footballer & manager of Hertha BSC and VfL Wolfsburg; played 432 games.
- Raimund Hörmann (born 1957), a retired German rower and gold medallist at the 1984 Summer Olympics
- Dieter Wiedenmann (1957–1994), a German rower and gold medallist at the 1984 Summer Olympics
- Nico Frommer (born 1978), a German former footballer who played 336 games
- Matthias Lehmann (born 1983), a German former footballer who played 524 games
- Alper Bagceci (born 1984), a German footballer who has played over 420 games
- Maximilian Reinelt (1988–2019), a German rower and physician; gold medallist at the 2012 Summer Olympics and silver medal at the 2016 Summer Olympics
- Sandro Sirigu (born 1988), an Italian-German footballer who has played over 325 games
- Sebastian Griesbeck (born 1990), a German footballer who has played over 390 games
- Maxim Rehm (born 2007), racing driver who currently competes in the Italian F4 Championship and the GB3 Championship
- Emilia Wickert (born 2007), a German rhythmic gymnast who competed in the 2024 Olympic Games

=== Otherwise associated with Ulm ===
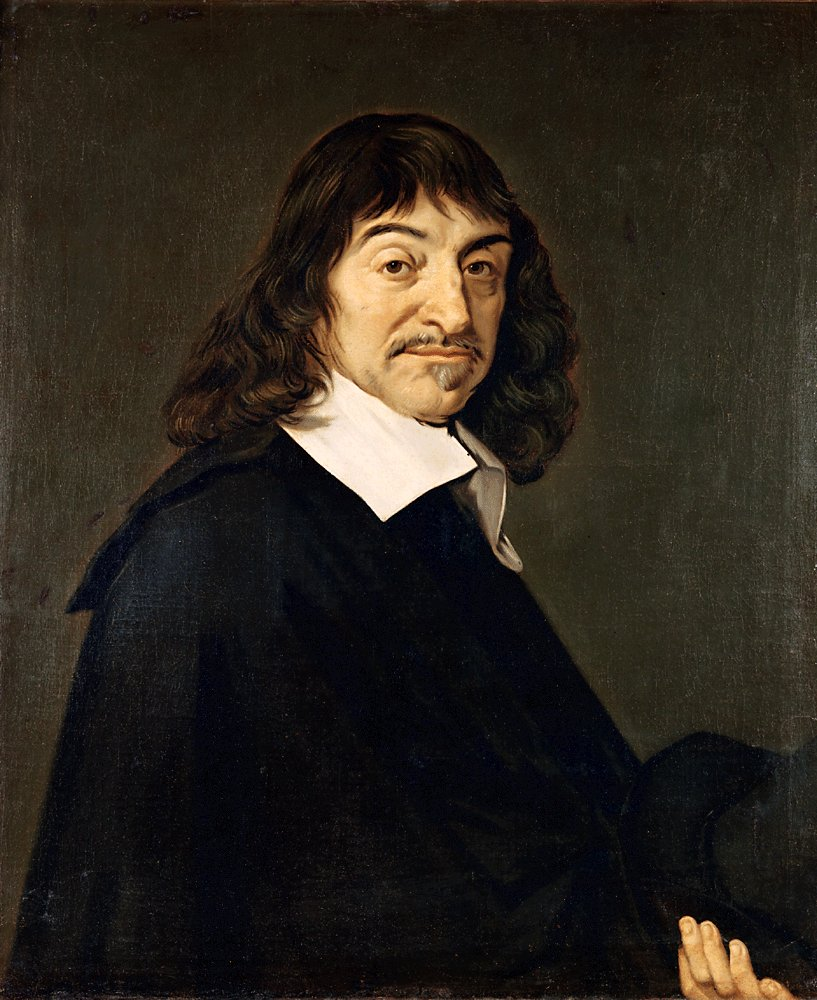
Portrait of René Descartes

- Ulrich Ensingen (1350/60 – 1419), master builder, helped construct Ulm Minster and Strasbourg Cathedral.
- Hans Multscher (ca.1400 – 1467 in Ulm), a German sculptor and painter, became a free citizen of Ulm in 1427.
- Matthäus Böblinger, (DE Wiki) (1450–1505), stonemason and master builder, helped construct Ulm Minster
- Leonhard Hutter (1563 in Nellingen – 1616), a German Lutheran theologian.
- Johannes Kepler (1571–1630), a German mathematician, astronomer and astrologer; lived in Ulm.
- René Descartes (1596–1650), philosopher, experienced a powerful vision near Ulm in 1619.
- Robert Bosch (1861 in Albeck – 1942), industrialist, engineer and inventor, founder of Robert Bosch GmbH.
- Carl Teike (1864–1922), composed the military march Alte Kameraden in Ulm in 1889
- Erwin Rommel (1891 in Heidenheim – 1944 at Herrlingen), a German field marshal in WWII.
- Gerhard Klopfer (1905–1987), senior Nazi official, SS General. attended the Wannsee Conference
- Herbert von Karajan, (1908–1989), conductor, Kapellmeister in Ulm, 1929–1934.
- Max Bill (1908–1994), architect and artist, co-founder and director of the Ulm School of Design
- Hans Scholl (1918–1943) & Sophie Scholl (1921–1943), founded the White Rose, spent their youth in Ulm
- Ivo Gönner (born 1952 in Laupheim), politician (SDP), Lord Mayor of Ulm, 1992 to 2016.
- Ludwig Merckle (born 1965), billionaire businessman.

== International relations ==
Ulm is a member city of the Eurotowns network.

Ulm is officially not twinned. But there are relations with:

- Arad, Romania
- Baja, Hungary
- Bratislava, Slovakia
- Budapest, Hungary
- Cluj-Napoca, Romania
- Jinotega, Nicaragua
- Kladovo, Serbia
- New Ulm, Minnesota, United States
- Novi Sad, Serbia
- Sibiu, Romania
- Silistra, Bulgaria
- Subotica, Serbia
- Timișoara in Romania
- Tulcea, Romania
- Vidin, Bulgaria
- Vukovar, Croatia
