= Katharina Volz =

Medical researcher and entrepreneur

Katharina Sophia Volz
- Born: 1987 (age 38–39); Ulm
- Education: Stanford University Harvard Medical School Graz University of Technology
- Employer: OccamzRazor

Katharina Sophia Volz (born in Ulm, Germany, 1987) is a German-American medical researcher and entrepreneur. She is the founder and chief executive officer of OccamzRazor, a biotechnology start-up based in New York City and San Francisco. OccamzRazor uses machine learning to discover and develop drugs for brain diseases.

== Early life and education ==
Volz was born and raised in Erbach near Ulm, Germany. After completing secondary school, with average grades, she obtained the Abitur at the grammar school "Valckenburgschule" in Ulm. She began studying molecular biology at the University of Graz, carrying out research in the United States. She has worked at Harvard Medical School, Ohio State University, UCLA, Howard Hughes Medical Institute, and Stanford University.

In 2012, Volz became the first Ph.D. in stem cell biology and regenerative medicine at Stanford University. She completed her Ph.D. in a record time of 2.5 years. She was the first person to identify the stem cells that form the coronary arteries. The progenitor stem cell named pericytes turn into smooth muscle cells in response to increased blood flow.

== Research and career ==
Volz is one of UNESCO's trusted speakers and was a United Nations WED fellow in 2015. Volz made it on the global Forbes 30 Under 30 list in 2017. Volz was a participant at the 2017, 2018, 2019 Science Foo Camp. She got accepted into the first cohort of the United Nations Nexus Accelerator program in 2020. She was named in MIT technology review's top 35 under 35 innovators.

=== OccamzRazor ===
Volz is the founder and chief executive officer of OccamzRazor, a biotechnology startup using machine learning to identify cures for brain-aging diseases such as Parkinson's. OccamzRazor is partnering with or has received grant funding from institutions the Michael J Fox Foundation, the Sergey Brin Family Foundation, and Stanford. OccamzRazor is further supported by investors Jeff Dean and Randy Schekman.
