= Homofenazine =

Antipsychotic medication

Clinical data
- Trade names: Pasaden, Oldagen (in Argentina)
- Other names: HFZ
- ATC code: N05A

Legal status
- Legal status: BR: Class C1 (Other controlled substances)

Identifiers
- CAS Number: 3833-99-6
- PubChem CID: 19687
- ChemSpider: 18545
- UNII: PEL7G6VRZ2
- ChEBI: CHEBI:59071
- ChEMBL: ChEMBL2105000
- CompTox Dashboard (EPA): DTXSID30191697

Chemical and physical data
- Formula: C_{23}H_{28}F_{3}N_{3}OS
- Molar mass: 451.55 g·mol^{−1}
- 3D model (JSmol): Interactive image
- Boiling point: 230–240 °C (446–464 °F)
- SMILES: C1CN(CCN(C1)CCO)CCCN2C3=CC=CC=C3SC4=C2C=C(C=C4)C(F)(F)F
- InChI: InChI=1S/C23H28F3N3OS/c24-23(25,26)18-7-8-22-20(17-18)29(19-5-1-2-6-21(19)31-22)12-4-11-27-9-3-10-28(14-13-27)15-16-30/h1-2,5-8,17,30H,3-4,9-16H2; Key:LOHNHQLZFYCAEQ-UHFFFAOYSA-N

Homofenazine is an antipsychotic drug of the phenothiazines class. It was synthesized by Wilhelm Schuler and colleagues at Degussa. In 1966, it was released in Belgium under the brand name Pasaden. At some point, it was quietly discontinued and is no longer marketed.

== Synthesis ==
Thieme Patents (Ex 5&6):

The alkylation between 2-(Trifluoromethyl)Phenothiazine [92-30-8] (1) and 1-(3-bromopropyl)-1,4-diazepane (2) led to 10-[3-(1,4-diazepan-1-yl)propyl]-2-(trifluoromethyl)phenothiazine, CID:110174391 (3). Further alkylation with 2-Chloroethanol [107-07-3] (4) completed the synthesis of homofenazine (5).
