= Wilhelm Schuler =

German chemist (1914–2010)

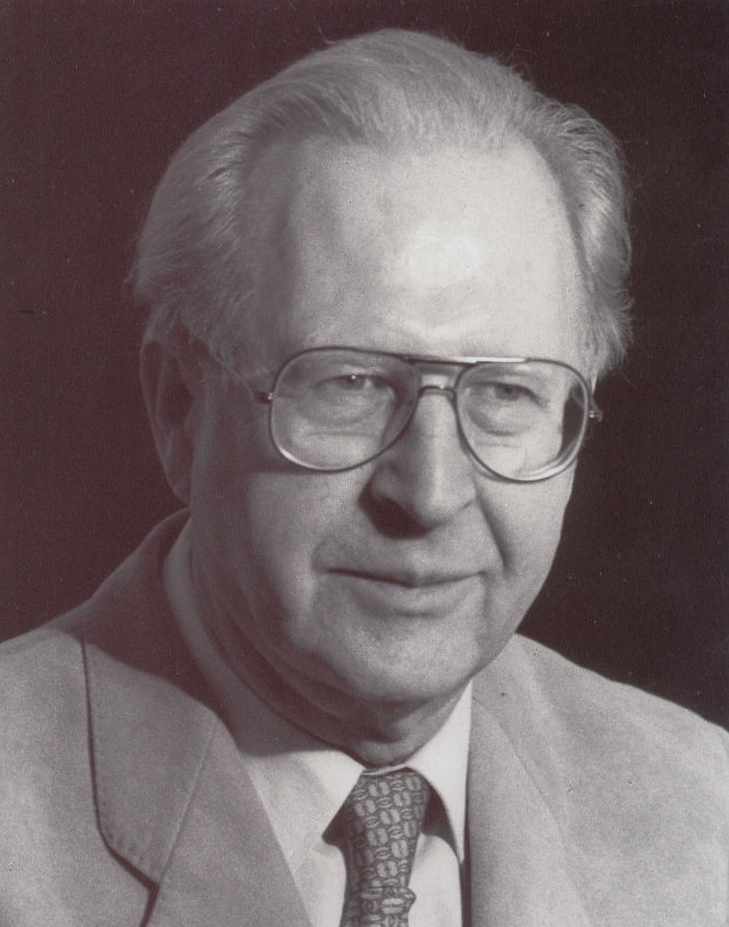
Wilhelm Schuler (1977)

Wilhelm Alfons Schuler (27 December 1914 in Ulm, Germany – 5 June 2010 in Bad Homburg vor der Höhe, Germany) was a chemist, inventor and entrepreneur in the second half of the 20th century.

== Biography ==
Schuler studied chemistry at the Königliche Technische Hochschule zu Danzig from 1934 onwards. After he obtained the title of Diplomchemiker (~Master of Chemistry) in 1939 he was drafted to the Wehrmacht. Just after 6 months of service he was discharged after Paul Rabe (Universität Hamburg) requested Schuler for important research projects in the field of pharmaceutical ingredients at the University of Danzig. Schuler worked in the research group of Henry Albers studying organic phosphorus compounds. In 1941 he received his PhD. He remained at the University of Danzig as assistant to Henry Albers, working on alkaloids. In 1944 Schuler started working on his professorial dissertation. Shortly before the end of World War II he joined the University of Hamburg. In the research group of Ilse Esdorn (1897–1985) he worked on the analysis of natural products, mainly alkaloids, glucosides and mucus from medicinal plants. He discovered a method for the production of a gelling agent made from heather, erica. This method became popular in the food and cosmetics industry. Schuler licensed the process to the company Spangenberg . With this income Schuler—only 32 years old—was able to start his own business. Together with a partner he founded “Dr. Schuler & Lange, Chemisches und Pharmazeutisches Laboratorium GmbH, Hamburg”. Schuler & Lange produced drug ingredients and performed pharmaceutical contract research. The main client for chemical research was the company Promonta, which later merged with Byk Gulden (today Altana). In cooperation with the biologist and pharmacologist Otto Nieschulz a couple of highly successful drugs were developed, amongst them:

- the neuroleptic drug Pecazine [Pacatal(D)],
- the antihistaminic drug Kolton (D), an 8-chlorotheophylline salt of diphenylpyraline, and
- Vaditon (D), a special galenic form of pyramidones, which could now be applied by injection.

In 1953 Degussa AG offered Schuler a rather unusual contract which allowed him to continue and expand his "private entrepreneurial activities" whilst working for Degussa. Schuler started as head of pharmaceutical research at the Degussa subsidiary (Chemiewerk Homburg). In this position Schuler was very creative and successful. In 1959 Wilhelm Schuler became head of the entire Degussa research and implemented new structures to their R&D-department. Schuler focused on the development of zeolites as components in detergents, the development of automotive catalysts and various further strategic solutions, which are paramount for Evonik Degussa GmbH and other companies until today. Schuler was an inspiring mentor for the chemists Gunther Dittrich, Rudolf Fahnenstich, Axel Kleemann, Peter Kleinschmit, Heribert Offermanns and Gerd Schreyer (selection).

In 1960 Schuler further expanded his “private” activities and founded Loftus Bryan Chem. Ltd. in County Wicklow, Ireland. 20 years later the company was sold to the US pharma giant Schering-Plough. In 1982 Wilhelm Schuler and his daughter started a new company, Iropharm Ltd., again in Ireland. It focused on the production of generic pharmaceutical ingredients and intermediates. In 1997 this company was sold to Allied Signal and was later acquired by Sigma-Aldrich. Schuler lived most of his life in Bad Homburg vor der Höhe. He is also buried there. He is survived by his daughter Beate.

== Literature ==
- Immer eine Idee besser, published by Degussa AG, Frankfurt am Main (Germany) 1998, pp 238–258, written by Axel Kleemann „Aufbau einer modernen Chemieforschung – Wilhelm Schuler“, ISBN 3-00-002389-5.
