= Lion-man of Hohlenstein-Stadel =

Prehistoric ivory sculpture discovered in the Hohlenstein-Stadel, a cave in Germany

Löwenmensch (Lion-man)
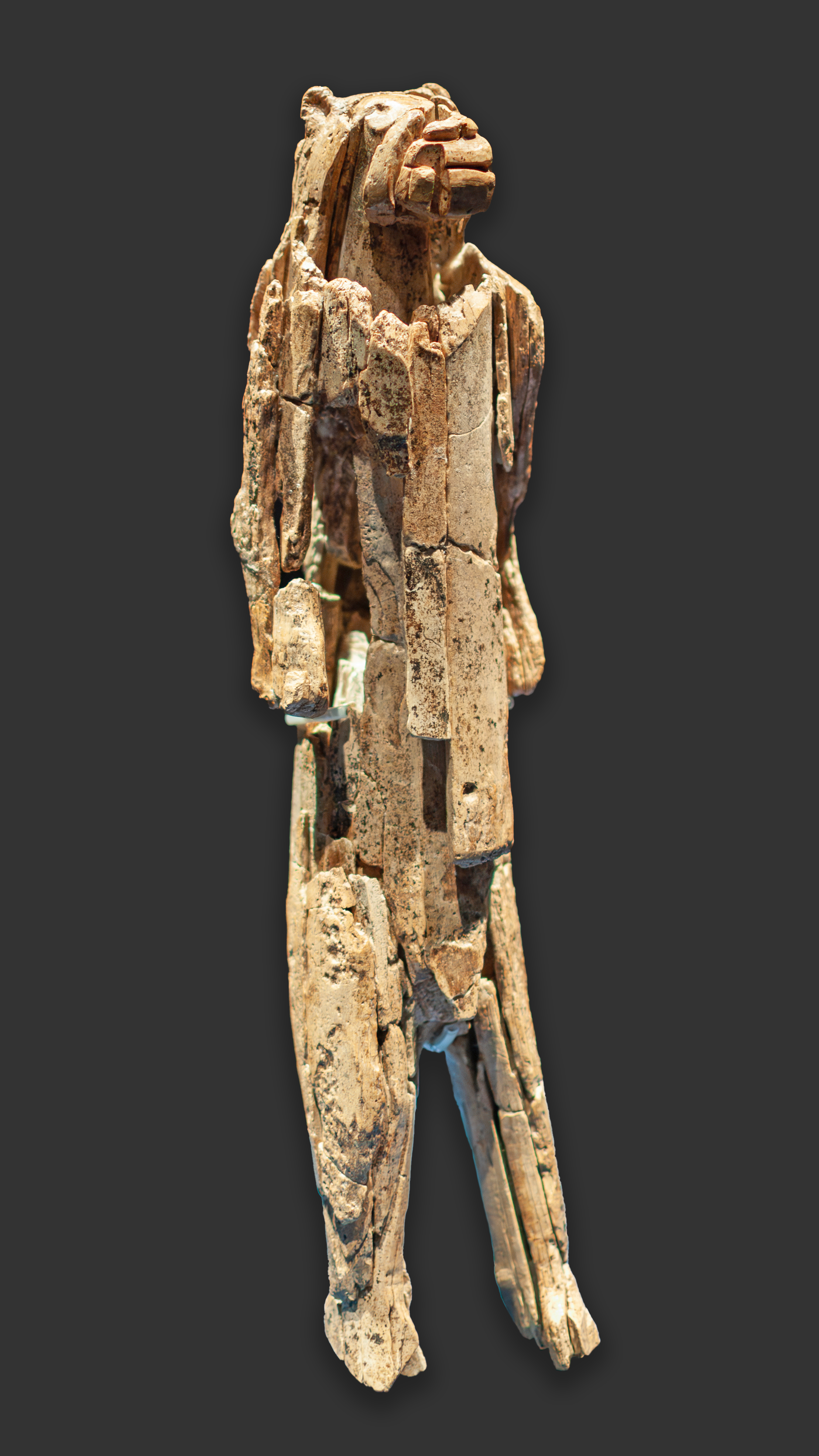
- Material: Mammoth ivory
- Created: c. 40,000 years ago
- Discovered: 25 August 1939; Asselfingen, Baden-Wurttemberg, Germany
- Discovered by: Otto Völzing
- Present location: Museum Ulm, Ulm, Baden-Wurttemberg, Germany

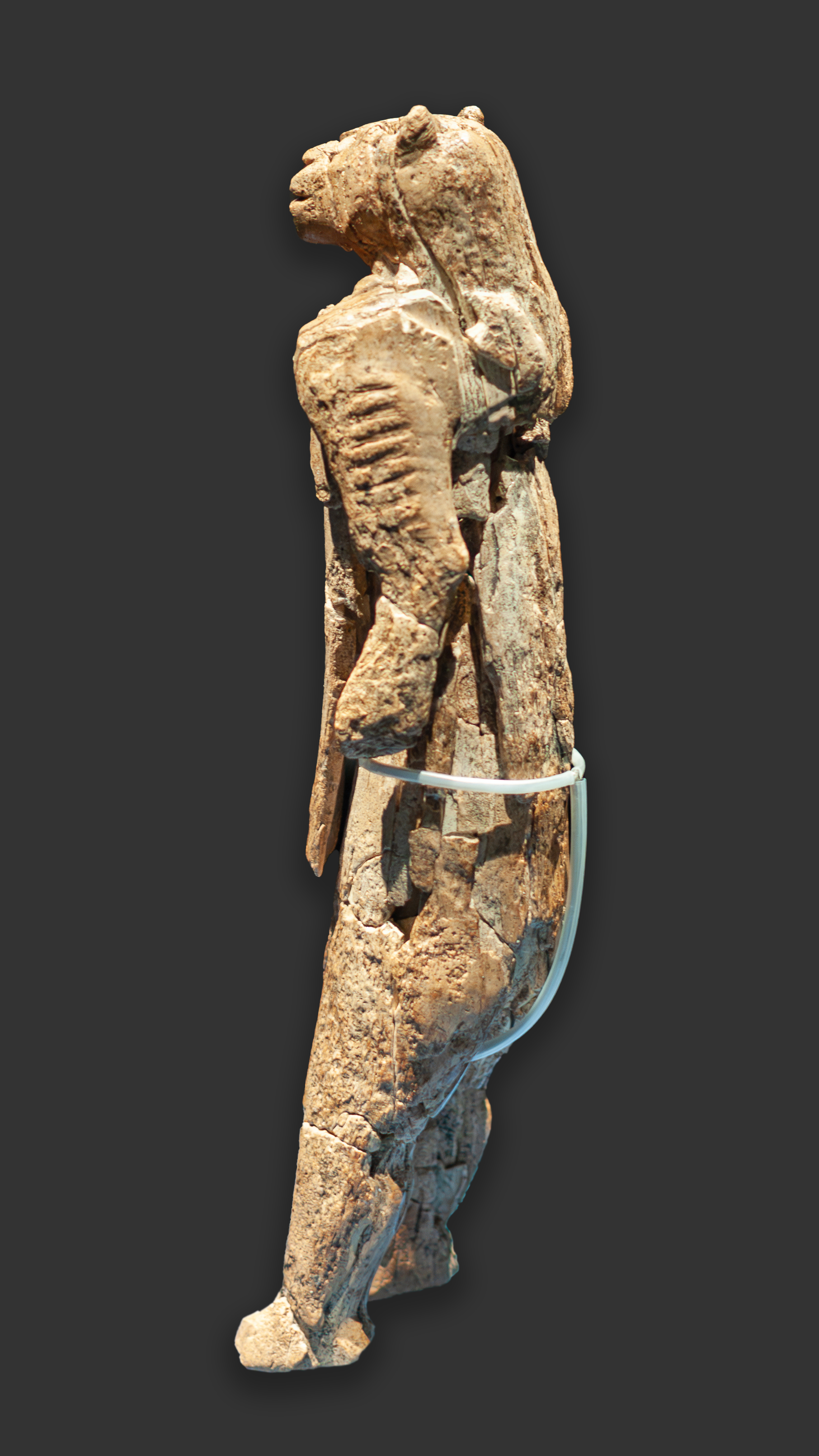
Side view showing the transverse gouges on the left arm

The Löwenmensch figurine, also called the Lion-man of Hohlenstein-Stadel, is a prehistoric sculpture discovered in Hohlenstein-Stadel, a German cave, part of the Caves and Ice Age Art in the Swabian Jura UNESCO World Heritage Site, in 1939. The German name, Löwenmensch, meaning "lion-person" or "lion-human", is used most frequently because it was discovered and is exhibited in Germany. It is an anthropomorphic figurine combining a human-like body with the head of a cave lion (Panthera spelaea).

Determined by carbon dating of the layer in which it was found to be between 35,000 and 41,000 years old, it is one of the oldest-known examples of an artistic representation and the oldest confirmed statue ever discovered. Its age associates it with the archaeological Aurignacian culture of the Upper Paleolithic. An example of zoomorphic art, it was carved out of mammoth ivory using a flint stone knife. Seven parallel, transverse, carved gouges are on the left arm.

After several reconstructions that have incorporated newly found fragments, the figurine stands 31.1 cm (12.2 in) tall, 5.6 cm (2.2 in) wide, and 5.9 cm (2.3 in) thick. It is currently displayed in the Museum Ulm, in the city of Ulm.

== History ==
Systematic excavations at Hohlenstein-Stadel cave began in 1937 under the direction of historian Robert Wetzel.

The discovery of a fragmented mammoth ivory figurine was made on 25 August 1939 by geologist Otto Völzing. The start of World War II just one week later meant that the fieldwork was left incomplete and analysis of the finds was not undertaken. The excavation trenches were back-filled with the same soil in which the ivory had been found. For approximately thirty years, the fragments lay forgotten at the nearby Museum Ulm. It was not until archaeologist Joachim Hahn started an inventory and assembly of more than 200 fragments that a figurine with animal and human features began to emerge.

Wetzel continued to spend summers digging at the site until 1961, and further finds of ivory were made on the cave floor in the 1970s. In 1982, paleontologist Elisabeth Schmid combined the new fragments with Hahn's reconstruction, correcting some errors and adding pieces of the nose and mouth which emphasized the figurine's feline characteristics. (Note: The images at this reference: show how much has been achieved after years of painstaking reconstruction.)

In 1987, a comprehensive restoration began in the workshops of the Landesmuseum Württemberg by Ute Wolf in cooperation with Schmid. During the work, which took more than six months, it was realized that the figurine was only about two-thirds complete. The back was severely damaged and the legs were missing some ivory lamellae. The ears, eye-holes, two-thirds of the mouth and nose, and the back of the head were preserved. To fill gaps in the head and body, a reversible substance consisting of a mixture of beeswax, artificial wax, and chalk was used.

In 2008, further excavations were carried out in the cave. All layers were sifted systematically, which led to many minute fragments being discovered. The first new adjustments were simulated virtually so that fragments could be added without having to disassemble the original recreation. (Note: This reference: shows the lion-man after restoration 1987–1988 with new fragments from the 2010 excavation (red) and free fragments from the stock of the museum (green).)

In 2012, a second restoration was begun in the workshops of the State Office for the Preservation of Historical Monuments in Esslingen under the leadership of Nicole Ebinger-Rist. The figurine was disassembled into its individual parts and newly discovered fragments were added along with the old ones, allowing further completion of areas of the head, back, and right side of the body, and artificial additions used during the first restoration were discarded. The Löwenmensch figurine grew in height from 296 to 311 millimetres. Work was completed in late 2013.

== Interpretation ==
Some researchers have ascribed sexual characteristics to the object. Initially, the figurine was classified as male by Hahn who suggested a plate on the abdomen could be a flaccid penis. Schmid later classified this feature as a pubic triangle; however, from examination of new parts of the sculpture, she proposed that the figurine was that of a woman with the head of a female cave lion. Male European cave lions appear to have largely or completely lacked the distinctive manes of their African counterparts, so the absence of a mane could not determine categorically that the figurine was that of a lioness, and a debate about its sex ensued among some involved in the research and the popular press. Kurt Wehrberger, of the Museum Ulm, stated that the statue had become an "icon of the feminist movement".

After the 2012–2013 restoration, it was realized that the triangular platelet in the genital area was processed all around, separating it from the figurine. A fracture point suggests that originally it may have been square in shape, which most commonly could be interpreted as a stylized male sex organ. Debate continues, even though an objective determination of the intended sex of the Löwenmensch figurine may be impossible.

The Löwenmensch figurine laid in a chamber almost 30 metres (98 ft) from the entrance of the Stadel cave, accompanied by many other objects. Bone tools and worked antlers were found, along with jewellery consisting of pendants, beads, and perforated animal teeth. The chamber was probably a special place, possibly used as a storehouse, hiding-place, or maybe as an area for cultic rituals.

A similar but smaller lion-headed human figurine was found in Hohle Fels. Archaeologist Nicholas Conard suggested that "the occupants of Hohle Fels in the Ach Valley and Hohlenstein-Stadel in the Lone Valley must have been members of the same cultural group and shared beliefs and practices connected with therianthropic images of felids and humans" and that "the discovery of a second Löwenmensch lends support to the hypothesis that Aurignacian people practised a form of shamanism."

The figurine shares certain similarities with later French cave paintings, which also show hybrid creatures with human-like lower bodies and animal heads, such as the "Sorcerer" from the Trois Frères in the Pyrenees or the "Bison-man" from the Grotte de Gabillou in the Dordogne.

Debate exists as to whether the figurine depicts a lion or human-lion hybrid figure at all; with similarities to a standing bear, and the unreliable nature of the reconstructions cited.

== Manufacture ==
The carving of the figurine from hard mammoth tusk would have been a complex and time-consuming task. (Note: This reference: shows the position of the figurine inside the original tusk. Schmid found that the groin area coincided with the apex of the tusk's pulp cavity. "The long axis of the figure follows the nerve canal with the head at the narrowing end. This expert positioning suggests that the maker deliberately selected a portion of the tusk suitable for a preconceived work." (Cook, 2013)) A similarly sized tusk found in the same cave has marks that "indicate that the skin and thin bone around the tooth cavity of the upper jaw were cut through to the surface of the tooth, which was then exposed for detachment with a hammer. The tip was harder and had to be removed by wedging and splitting."

Wulf Hein and Kurt Wehrberger conducted an experimental replication with the kinds of stone tools available at the time. Removing the base of the tusk took ten hours. The body was carved with a steep-fronted scraper; the burins requiring regular resharpening. Several tools were needed to separate the torso from the insides of the arms while shaping the head and shoulders, which involved difficult cutting across the grain of the ivory, often requiring two hands on the tool. The basic shaping is estimated to have taken around 200 hours, and in total the recreation likely took more than 370 hours. (Note: The Ulm Museum site says 360 hours, Cook (2013) says 320 hours, whereas the video made by the team says 370+ hours.) Jill Cook, Curator of Palaeolithic collections at the British Museum, suggests that "unless the sculpture was created slowly at odd moments over several months, someone as skilled as an artist may have been excused from other subsistence tasks to work specially on this piece."

In his October 2017 BBC Radio 4 series Living with the Gods, Neil MacGregor asked Cook

... so why would a community living on the edge of subsistence, whose primary concerns were finding food, keeping that fire going, protecting children from predators, allow someone to spend so much time away from those tasks?

She replied that it was about

... a relationship to things unseen, to the vital forces of nature, that you need to perhaps propitiate, perhaps connect to, in order to ensure your successful life.

== Exhibitions ==
In 1956 Robert Wetzel, leader of the original excavation expedition, endowed all his archaeological finds from the Lonetal to the city Ulm. They are still owned by the city today. The original figurine is part of the permanent archaeological exhibition of Museum Ulm since its first re-assembly in the 1970s.

=== Special exhibitions ===
- 2009/2010 Der Löwenmensch – Das Experiment (“The lion-man – The experiment”), Museum Ulm: The focus of this exhibition was a reproduction of the figurine carved under historically authentic conditions. The facsimile figurine was made by archaeotechnician Wulf Hein using flintstone tools in 320 hours. In 2010 this exhibition was shown in Stadtmuseum Erlangen together with additional paleolithic ivory artifacts from the University of Erlangen collection.
- 2013/2014 Die Rückkehr des Löwenmenschen. Geschichte – Mythos – Magie (“The Return of the Lion Man: History – Myth – Magic”), Museum Ulm: exhibition of the newly re-assembled figurine. An accompanying booklet was published in English.
- 2025/2026 Fabelhaft! Der Löwenmensch und seine Nachfahren, Kunsthalle Weishaupt: exhibition of the reassembled figurine together with portrayals of other hybrid creatures from human cultural history.

== See also ==
General stone age art topics

- Art of the Upper Paleolithic
- List of Stone Age art
- Prehistoric art

Examples of zoomorphic stone age art

- Lascaux
- Bird-horse-man from Hornos de la Peña
- Vogelherd figurines
- Venus of Hohle Fels

Related ancient history lion-headed figures

- Arimanius – obscure lion-headed god in Mithraism
- Bastet – cat-headed goddess in Ancient Egypt (originally lion-headed)
- Sekhmet – lion-headed war goddess in Ancient Egypt
- Narasimha - lion-headed Hindu god, an avatar of Vishnu.
