= Hohlenstein-Stadel =

Cave in the Swabian Jura

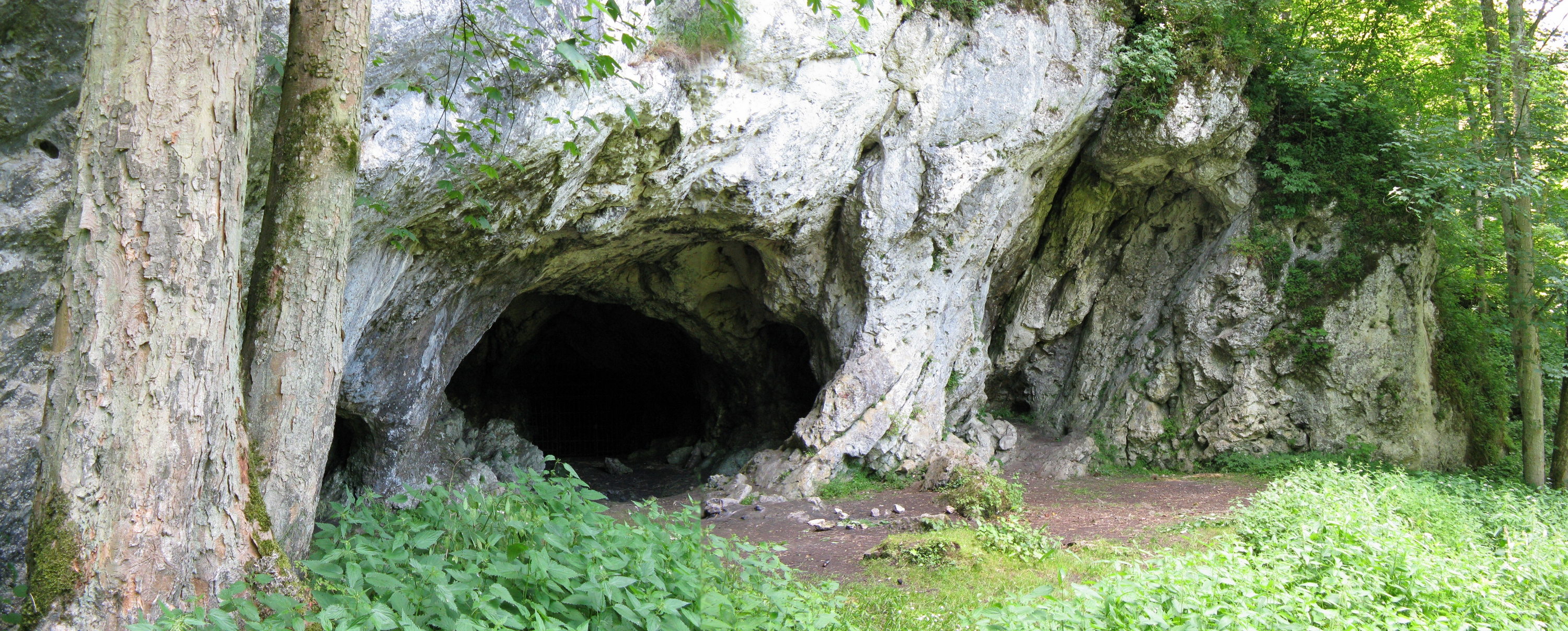
- Hohlenstein-Stadel, a cave

- Location within Germany Location within Baden-Württemberg
- Interactive map of Hohlenstein-Stadel
- Location: Lone valley, Swabian Jura, Germany
- Coordinates: 48°32′57″N 10°10′21″E

UNESCO World Heritage Site
- Official name: Caves and Ice Age Art in the Swabian Jura
- Type: Cultural
- Criteria: iii
- Designated: 2017 (41st session)
- Reference no.: 1527
- Region: Europe and North America

Hohlenstein-Stadel is a cave located in the Hohlenstein cliff (not to be confused with the Hohle Fels) at the southern rim of the Lonetal (valley of the Lone) in the Swabian Jura in Germany. While first excavations were started after the second half of the 19th century, the significance of some of the findings was not realized until 1969. The most significant finding was a small ivory statue called the Löwenmensch, which is one of the oldest pieces of figurative art ever found.

The Hohlenstein cliffs are made of limestone which was hollowed out by natural causes to create caves. The Stadel (meaning "barn") is one of three caves in the area that are of important paleontological and archaeological significance. The other two are the Kleine Scheuer ("little barn") and the Bärenhöhle ("bears' cave"). In 2017 the site became part of the UNESCO World Heritage Site Caves and Ice Age Art in the Swabian Jura.

== Excavations ==
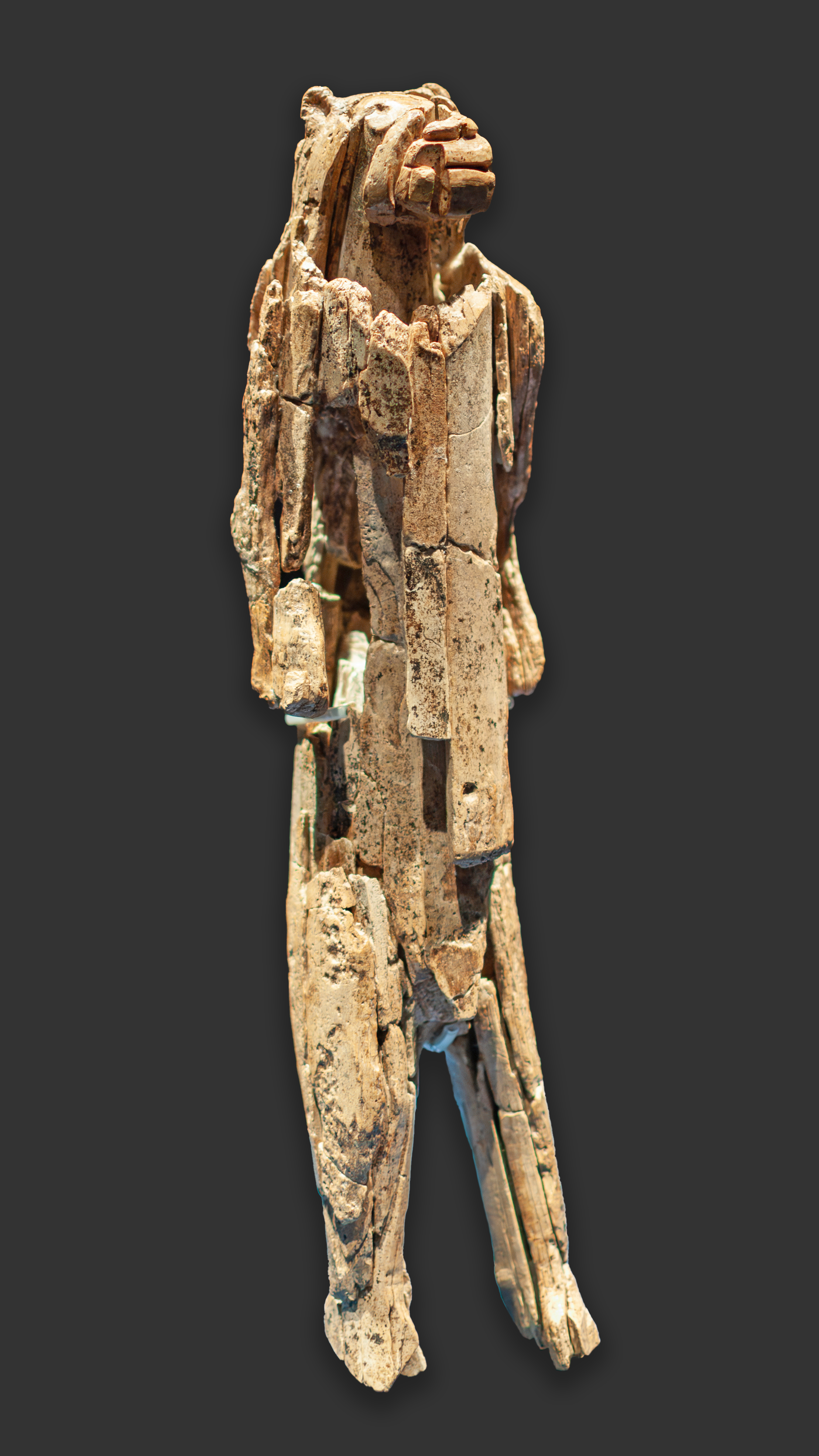
The Löwenmensch figure, one of the most spectacular finds from the cave, after restoration in 2013

The first excavations at Hohlenstein were made in 1861 by Oskar Fraas, geologist and paleontologist, who was searching for cave bear bones at the Bärenhöhle and the Stadel. He returned in 1866, realizing the archeological importance of the site.

In 1935, archaeologists returned to excavate the cave. An initial trial dig under Robert Wetzel was followed by further work in 1936. Between 1937 and 1939 further excavations were conducted directed by Wetzel and Otto Völzing, a geologist. On the last day of digging, on 25 August 1939, Völzing found a large number of broken pieces of ivory. They were little noted and went into storage at the Museum Ulm.

It was not until 1969 that Joachim Hahn came across the more than 200 pieces and assembled them into a 31-cm-tall figurine of a humanoid with a lion's head. This is now known as the Löwenmensch. At 35,000 to 40,000 years old, it qualifies as one of the oldest pieces of figurative art ever discovered. Although the significance of figurines such as this is still unknown, they may have been effigies of a primitive religion.

Further excavations followed in 1956 and 1957, and between 1959 and 1961. The stratigraphy includes layers from the Neolithic, Mesolithic, Upper Paleolithic, notably the Magdalenian and the Aurignacian periods and finally the Middle Paleolithic.

More work followed in 1996 and 1997, when a dig led by Nicholas Conard, Michael Bolus and Andrew Kandel was conducted in the valley in front of the caves. Interior excavation was resumed in 2008 to 2013 by the Landesamt für Denkmalpflege Baden-Württemberg (state office for monument protection). This work, led by Thomas Beutelspacher and C.J. Kind managed to locate the exact spot in which the Lion-man had been discovered and to find numerous additional ivory splinters that were found to fit onto the figurine. Dating of bones found immediately next to them yielded an age of 35,000 to 41,000 years.

In addition to the Lion-man figurine, pendants carved from mammoth ivory and perforated animal teeth dating from the Aurignacian have been uncovered at the cave.

== Archaeogenetics ==
On 27 August 1937, excavators discovered the right femur diaphysis, measuring around 25 cm (10 in) in length, of an archaic hominin in the cave. The femur came from a layer associated with Middle Paleolithic Mousterian artefacts. This femur represents the only archaic hominin fossil found in a Mousterian context within the entire Swabian Jura region. Attempts to radiocarbon date the femur have yielded inconsistent results; however, molecular dating suggests that the femur is roughly 124,000 years old.

In 2017, researchers successfully sequenced the full mtDNA genome from the femur. The results confirmed that the femur belonged to a Neanderthal. The mtDNA from the Hohlenstein-Stadel sample is highly divergent from those of other available Neanderthal samples. The addition of this mtDNA sample itself results in a near doubling of the genetic diversity of available Neanderthal mtDNA using Watterson's estimator theta; this suggests that Neanderthal mtDNA diversity was higher than previously presumed. Researchers estimate that the Hohlenstein-Stadel mtDNA diverged from other Neanderthal lineages around 270,000 years ago.

== UNESCO World Heritage Site ==
In January 2016, the federal government of Germany applied for the status of World Heritage Site for two valleys with six caves named Höhlen der ältesten Eiszeitkunst ("caves with the oldest Ice Age art"). The site would encompass areas in the Lonetal (valley of the Lone) and the Achtal (valley of the Ach), both in the southern Swabian Jura. The former includes the caves Hohlenstein-Stadel, Vogelherd and Bocksteinhöhle, the latter Geissenklösterle, Hohle Fels and Sirgenstein Cave. Each valley would contain a core area of around 3 to 4 km (1.9 to 2.5 mi) length, surrounded by a buffer zone of a least 100 m (330 ft) width.

In the argument why these sites deserve recognition as a part of the universal human heritage, the area is described as the source of the currently oldest (non-stationary) works of human art in the form of carved animal and humanoid figurines as well as the oldest musical instruments. Their creators lived, were inspired, and worked in and around these caves. The caves also served as the repositories of the figurines which may have been used in a religious context. In addition, they were the venue where performers used the excavated musical instruments and where the social groups lived from which the artists sprang.

The committee awarded the status of WHS in July 2017.
