= Elisabeth Schmid =

Geologist, paleontologist, archaeologist and prehistorian (1912-1994)

- Born: 1912; Freiburg im Breisgau
- Died: 27 March 1994, age 81 or 82
- Occupation: Archaeologist

Academic background
- Education: University of Freiburg

Academic work
- Notable works: Atlas of Animal Bones (1972)

Elisabeth Schmid (1912–27 March 1994) was a German archaeologist and osteologist. She is best known for her work concerning the prehistoric ivory statue, the Lion-man, and for her book, Atlas of Animal Bones. Schmid was the first woman to serve as dean of the natural sciences faculty of the University of Basel. In 1953 she co-founded the Swiss Archaeological Society with Rudolf Laur-Belart.

== Early life and career ==
Schmid was born in Freiburg im Breisgau in 1912 and graduated with a PhD from the University of Freiburg. She was habilitated in Freiburg and Basel.

Over her career, Schmid published over two hundred papers and two books. She began studying animal bones from Augusta Raurica in the 1950s, and her analysis of those bones was the subject of her most well-known book, Atlas of Animal Bones, which was published in 1972 and is still used worldwide today. In 1953, she established a laboratory at the University of Basel for prehistoric studies. In 1975 she became the first woman to serve as dean of the natural sciences faculty. She co-founded the Swiss Archaeological Society with Rudolf Laur-Belart in 1953. In 1987 she was made an honorary member of the Swiss Prehistoric Society.

In the 1980s, Schmid became involved with the prehistoric ivory sculpture known as the Lion-man. It was first discovered in 1939 in a cave in southwestern Germany by Otto Völzing. Around 30 percent of the statue is missing, and its gender is heavily disputed. German archaeologist Joachim Hahn interpreted part of the statue as representing male genitalia; however, Schmid later interpreted the same part of the statue as a pubic triangle. Further restoration of the statue began in autumn 1987 by Schmid and restorer Ute Wolf.

Schmid died on 27 March 1994.
