= Bockstein Cave =

Cave in Germany

- Bocksteinhöhle
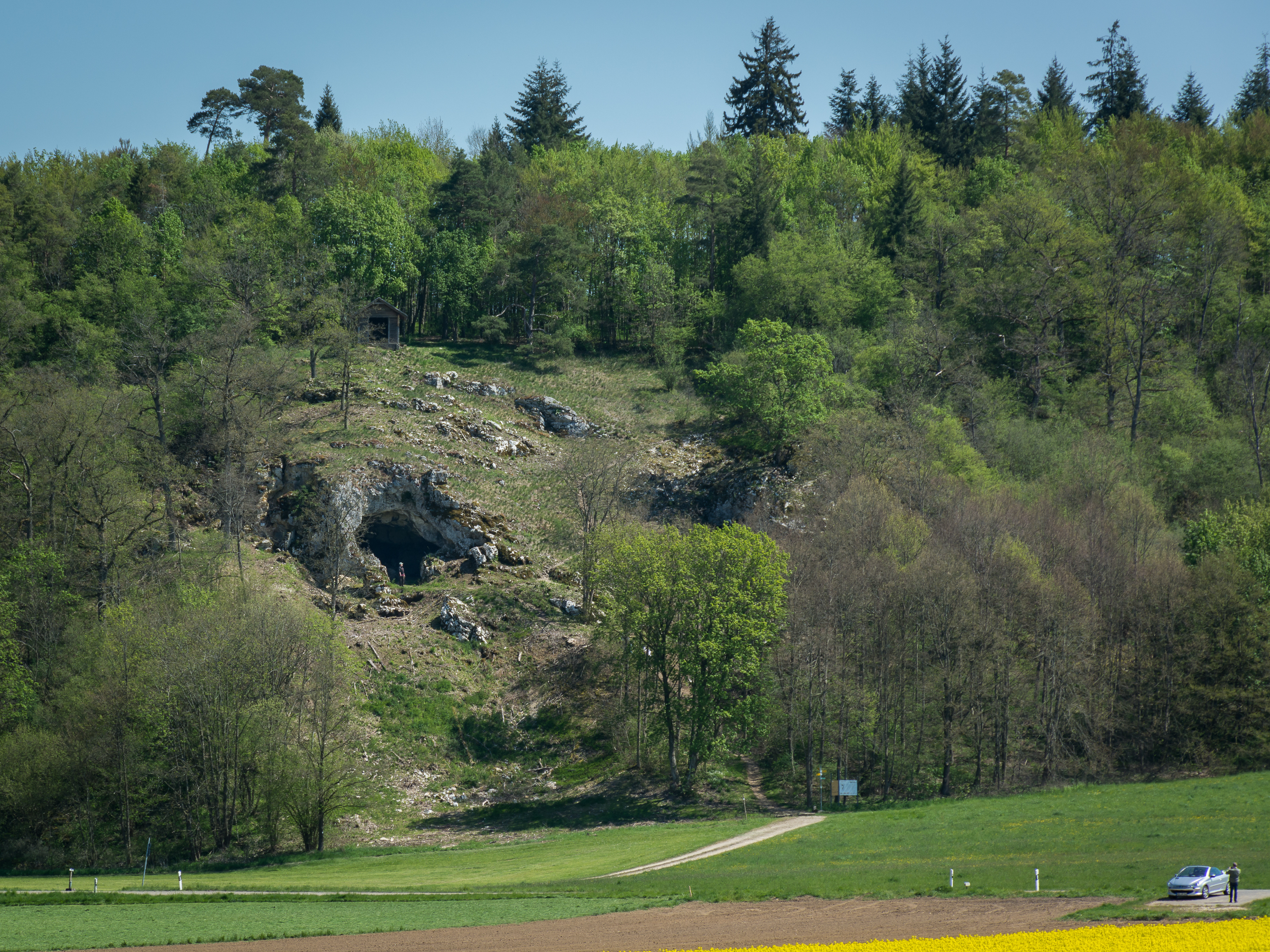
- Bockstein Cave entry

- location in Germany Bockstein Cave (Germany)
- 48°34′47″N 10°12′45″E
- Type: karst cave
- Cultures: Mousterian, Aurignacian, Micoquien, Magdalénien
- Associated with: Homo neanderthalensis, Homo sapiens
- Location: Lone River valley
- Region: Swabian Jura, Baden-Württemberg, Germany

Site notes
- Material: limestone
- Length: 20 m (66 ft)
- Width: 15 m (49 ft)
- Excavation dates: 1881, 1932, 1933, 1953
- Archaeologists: Ludwig Bürger, Friedrich Lösch, Robert Wetzel, Anton Bamberger

UNESCO World Heritage Site
- Official name: Caves and Ice Age Art in the Swabian Jura
- Type: Cultural
- Criteria: iii
- Designated: 2017 (41st session)
- Reference no.: 1527
- Region: Europe and North America

The Bockstein Cave, German: Bocksteinhöhle is part of the Bockstein complex – a White Jurassic limestone rock massif. The 15 by 20 m (49 by 66 ft) rock shelter, among small peripheral caves is situated around 12 m (39 ft) above the Lone River valley bottom, north of the towns of Rammingen and Öllingen, Heidenheim district in the central Swabian Jura, southern Germany. Several small openings, that are the actual entrances to the site, lead to various cave sections. The large frontal opening is of modern origin, created during the first excavation works in the late 19th century.

Among Mesolithic and Neolithic stone tools and artefacts numerous bone fossils, that date back 50,000 to 70,000 years were found, making the location the oldest known settlement complex of Neanderthals in southern Germany. Moreover, the ca. 8,000 year old and relatively well preserved skeletons of a woman and an infant were discovered. Because of its historical and cultural significance and its testimony to the development of Paleolithic culture, the cave was inscribed on the UNESCO World Heritage List as part of the Caves and Ice Age Art in the Swabian Jura site in 2017.

== Site ==
The Bockstein is one of the Lonetal caves that didn't need to be discovered as it had always been open and accessible. Amateurs Ludwig Bürger and Dr. Friedrich Lösch first probed the site in 1881 and, well funded by the local Association for Art and Antiquity in Ulm und Oberschwaben, undertook excavations in 1883/84.

In a thorough excavation of the central rock shelter down to the rock bottom, rich sediments of cultures of the younger Paleolithic (Aurignacian and Magdalénien) were dug out and examined. The soils of around a dozen layers contained a great number of fossilized objects (tools, bones, charcoal etc.). The artefacts included flint blades, bone tips, pierced teeth for attachments and a worked reindeer antler rod. In addition, personal ornaments were found, including pendants made out of ivory and stone. From Neolithic cultural stratae on top of the glacial layers, fossilized bone fragments and debris and ceramic shards were salvaged. The quality and composition of these Neolithic objects suggests, that the site was only used as a temporary shelter by the local Homo sapiens population.

In 1908, in a small test excavation Tübingen scholar R. R. Schmidt dug a control profile in order to probe the western hatching of the cave, which however only brought limited stratigraphic results.

From 1932 to 1935 Robert Wetzel excavated the Bockstein massif's peripheral sections, such as the Bocksteinschmiede and the Western Hole. There he found and documented Mesolithic sediments, that contained Micoquien hand axes, celts, adzes and very distinct flint blade knives, which he subsequently referred to as the Bocksteinmesser (Bockstein knife).

In the summer and autumn of 1953 he excavated the slopes in front and the entrance areas of the central cave and the Bocksteinschmiede, where he came upon still undisturbed layers. Just west of the large entrance hole, which had only been made by Ludwig Bürger during the 1883/84 excavation, these reached a depth of up to three meters. The actual Paleolithic entrance location of the cave, named (German: das Törle - the small gate) by Wetzel, could be determined after a broad connection between the newly found and exposed layers and the inner cave sediments was discovered.

== Stratigraphy ==
The profile found below the old Paleolithic entrance (das Törle - the small gate) from top to bottom:

- Layer I: Black humus with limestone pieces and fine limestone debris (Neolithic).
- Layer II: Gravel with black-brown to brown soil (microlithic culture).
- Layer III: fine gravel in yellowish loess soil (above microlithic culture).
- Layer IV: loess soil with coarse limestone pieces (Magdalenian).
- Layer V: loess soil with even coarser lime (Magdalenian).
- Layer VI: Loess with coarse chunks of limestone and traces of fireplaces (Aurignacian).
- Layer VII: Reddish violet-brown culture soil and large quantity of small to medium-sized limestone debris (Aurignacian).
- Layer VIII: brownish yellow clay (Mousterian).
- Layer IX: yellow clay, often sintered.
- Layer X: brown clay and bone deposit.
- Layer XI: yellow, partly reddish soil.

=== Carbon dated fossils ===
Lab number	Material	Normalized Age	Locality
KIA-8955	horse metapodal, fresh break	46380 ± 1360	local
KIA-8954	reindeer femur(?), fresh break	44390 ± 990	local
H-4059-3527	mixed bone sample	31965 ± 790	local
KIA-8953	reindeer radius-ulna, fresh break	31530 ± 230	local
KIA-8952	reindeer metatarsal, fresh break	30130 ± 260	local
W-279	Rangifer tarandus antler	24000 ± 3000	local
H-4049-3356	mixed bone sample	26133 ± 376	local
KIA-8956	long bone fragment with fresh break	20990 ± 120	local

The rock shelter is now in danger of collapse. There is a wooden shelter above the cave. In 2017, the cave was included in the UNESCO World Heritage list as part of the Caves and Ice Age Art in the Swabian Jura.

The Bockstein fossils and artefacts are exhibited in the Ulm City Museum.

== See also ==
- Brillenhöhle
- Vogelherd Cave
- Hohle Fels
