= Friedrich August von Quenstedt =

German geologist and palaeontologist

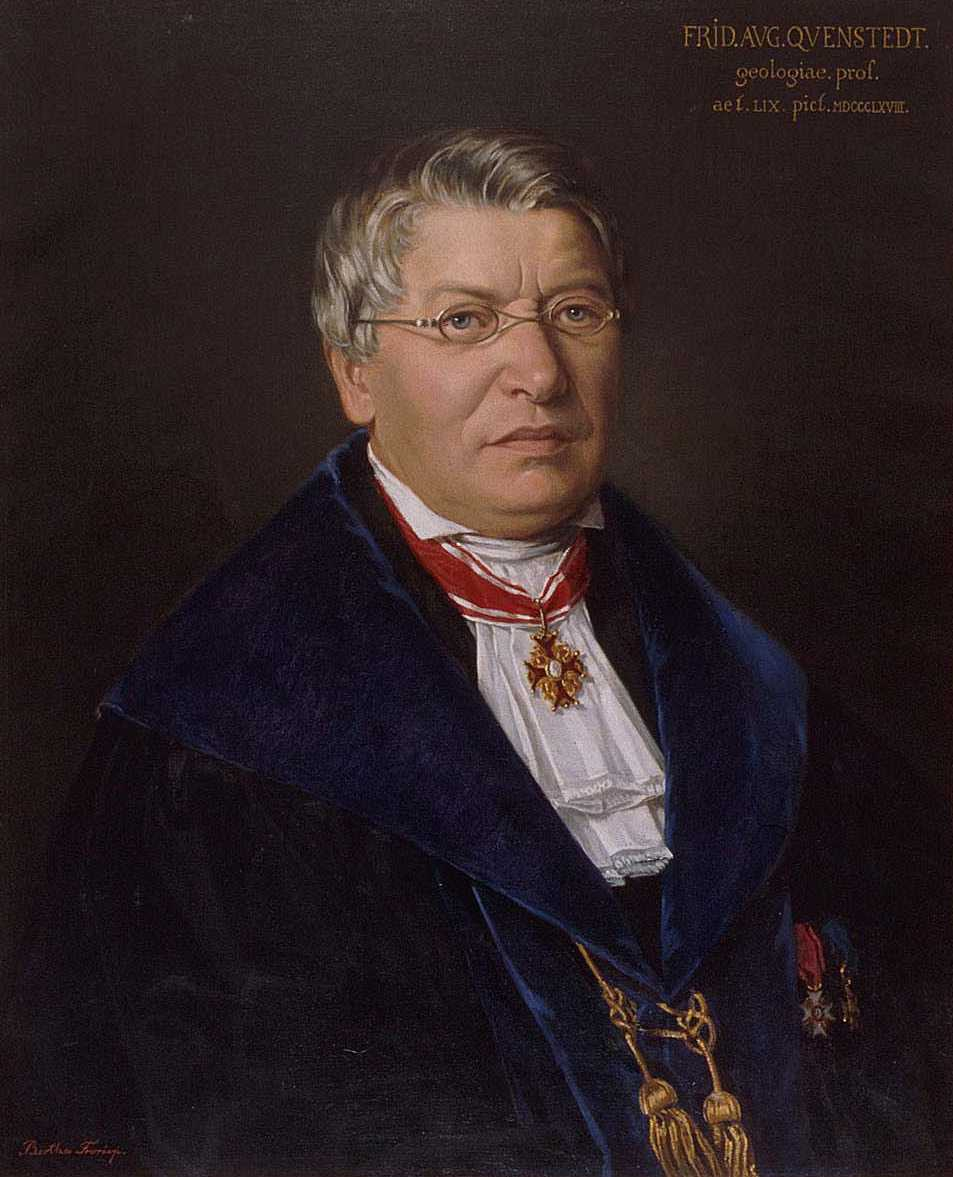
Friedrich August von Quenstedt.

Friedrich August von Quenstedt (9 July 1809 – 21 December 1889) was a German geologist and palaeontologist.

== Life ==
Von Quenstedt was born at Eisleben in Saxony, and educated at the Humboldt University of Berlin. After a period as assistant in the mineralogical museum, he was appointed associate professor (1837) and then professor (1841) of mineralogy and geognosy at the Eberhard Karls Universität Tübingen.

== Work ==
His earlier work related chiefly to crystallography and mineralogy, on which subjects he published text-books that were widely used. However, he also became distinguished for his researches on palaeontology, and especially for those on the fossils of the Jurassic system.

In 1845, he devised a trinomial system of nomenclature for Jurassic ammonites, which has caused some difficulty for later taxonomists. He investigated series of ammonite fossils which appeared to represent the coiled and uncoiled forms of similar shells, and considered that they arose as 'pathological' forms. He also wrote several articles on pterosaurs.

Five genera were named in his honour: the bivalve mollusc genus Quenstedtia Morris & Lycett 1854 and the (homonymous) coelenterate genus Quenstedtia Rominger 1876, coelenterate genus Quenstedtiphyllia Melnikova 1975, ammonite genus Quenstedtoceras Hyatt, 1876, and crinoid genus Quenstedticrinus Klikushin 1987. Also the specific epithet of Proganochelys quenstedti was named after him.

The mineral quenstedtite was named in his honour by G. Linck in 1888.

When Maria von Linden wrote her first paper on the mineral deposits in the River Hürbe it was read at Karlsruhe's geological society (by a man) in 1890. The paper was noticed by Quenstedt who supported her ambitions. Linden went on to be the first woman in Germany to be called a professor.

== Chief publications ==
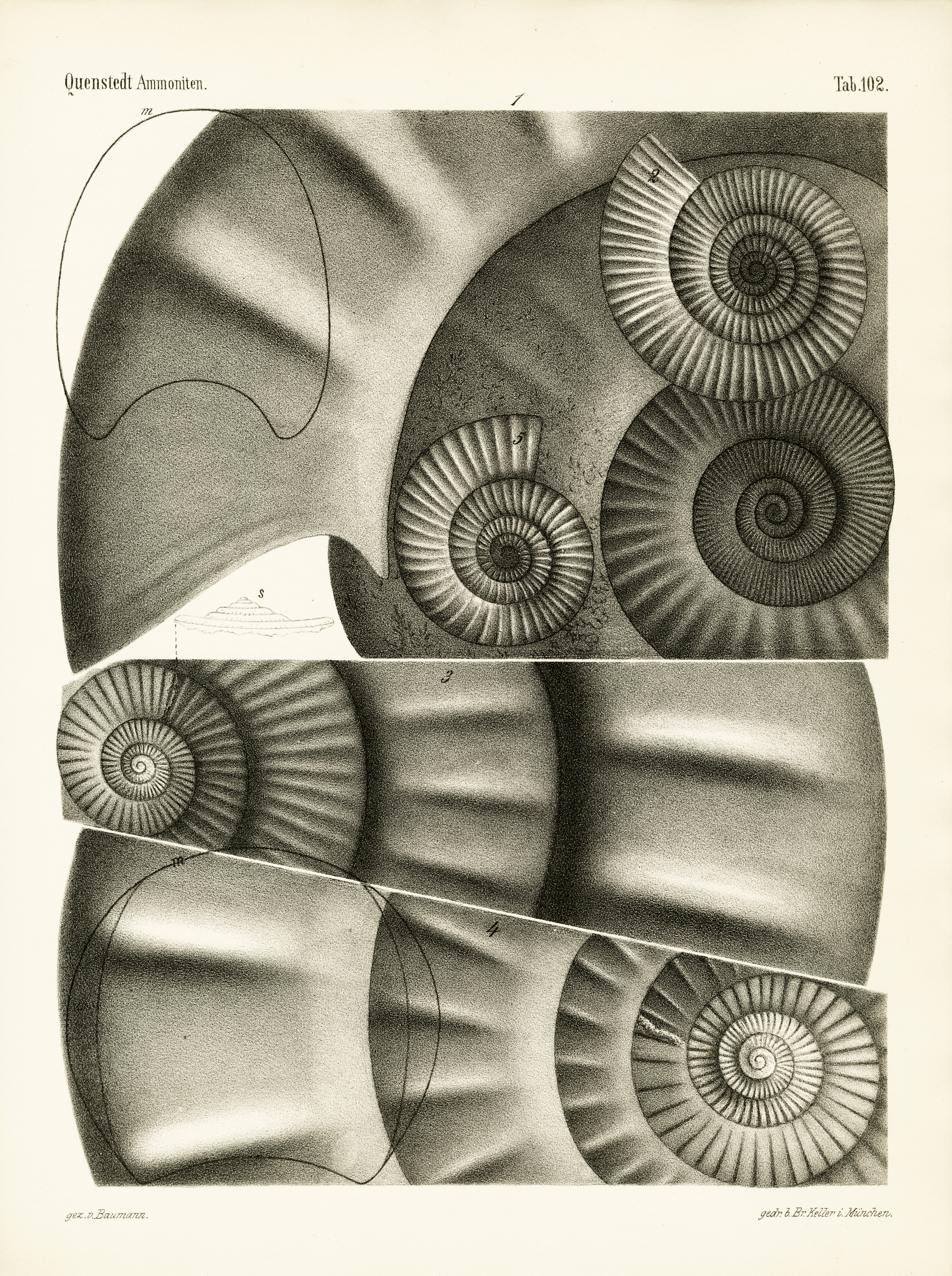
Plate 102 from Die Ammoniten des Schwäbischen Jura (1883-85) by Friedrich August von Quenstedt.

His chief publications were:

- Method der Krystallographie (1840)
- Das Flözgebirge Wurttembergs (1843)
- Petrefactenkunde Deutschlands (7 vols. and atlases, 1846–84)
- Die Cephalopoden (1846–49)
- Handbuch der Petrefactenkunde (2 vols., 1852, 2nd ed. 1867, 3rd ed. 1882-85)
- Der Jura (2 vols, 1858)
- Handbuch der Mineralogie (1855, 3rd ed. 1877)
- Die Ammoniten des Schwäbischen Jura (1883–84).

== Other references ==
Obituary by WT Blanford, Quart. Journ. Geol. Soc. vol. xlvi. pp. 51–52,1890.
