= Caves and Ice Age Art in the Swabian Jura =

UNESCO World Heritage Site in Germany

UNESCO World Heritage Site
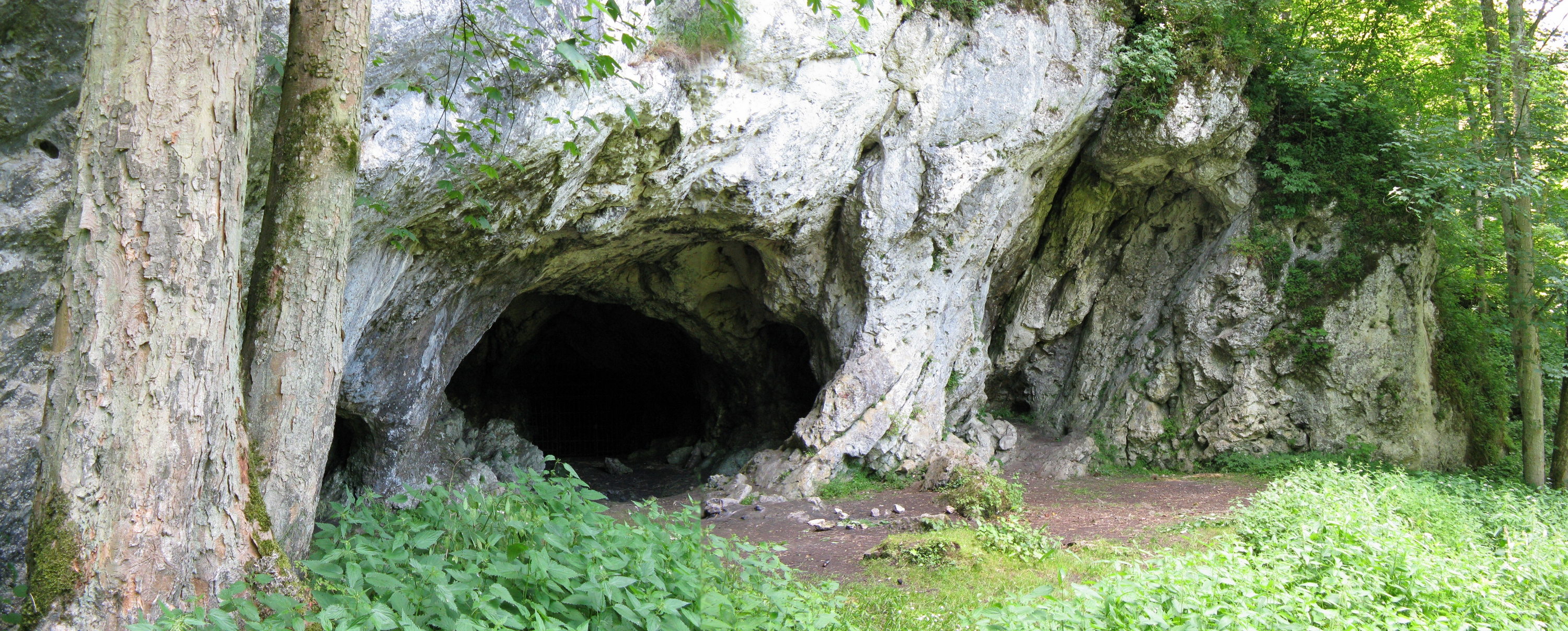
- Hohlenstein-Stadel, one of the six caves that makes up the site
- Interactive map of Caves and Ice Age Art in the Swabian Jura
- Location: Swabian Jura, Germany
- Criteria: Cultural: (iii)
- Reference: 1527
- Inscription: 2017 (41st Session)
- Area: 462.1 ha (1,142 acres)
- Buffer zone: 1,158.7 ha (2,863 acres)
- Coordinates: 48°23′16″N 9°45′56″E

The Caves and Ice Age Art in the Swabian Jura are a collection of six caves in southern Germany which were used by Ice Age humans for shelter about 33,000 to 43,000 years ago. Within the caves were found the oldest non-stationary works of human art yet discovered, in the form of carved animal and humanoid figurines, in addition to the oldest musical instruments ever found. One statuette of a female form, carved figurines of animals (including cave lions, mammoths, horses and cattle), musical instruments and items of personal adornment have been discovered. Some of the figurines depict creatures that are half animal, half human. Because of their testimony to the development of Paleolithic art and culture, the six caves were inscribed on the UNESCO World Heritage List in 2017.

The caves are seen as the first centre of human art, were named "cradle of art" and "cradle of civilization", with a continuous cultural heritage over 6000 years, and are among the first settlements of modern humans in Europe.

Bone flutes from the Geissenklösterle cave, dated around c. 43,150–39,370 BP, are the oldest musical instruments ever found. The 41,000 to 39,000-year-old Lion-man and the 42,000 to 41,000-year-old Venus of Hohle Fels are the oldest confirmed sculptures in the world.

== Location ==
2017 VOA report about the caves

The World Heritage comprises six caves which are distributed across two valleys in the Swabian Jura: Lone (river) Valley and Ach Valley. The former includes the caves Hohlenstein-Stadel, Vogelherd and Bocksteinhöhle; the latter Geissenklösterle, Hohle Fels and Sirgenstein Cave. Each valley would contain a core area of around 3 to 4 km (1.9 to 2.5 mi) length, surrounded by a buffer zone of a least 100 m (330 ft) width.

A documentation center not far from Ulm in the town of Blaubeuren, the "Urgeschichtliches Museum Blaubeuren", displays archaeological findings, including the Venus of Hohle Fels, the earliest known undisputed example of a depiction of a human being in prehistoric art. Scientific findings, experimental archeology and modern museum education can be found under one roof.

== Geology and History ==
The bedrock of the caves began to form roughly 200 million years ago, at the beginning of the Jurassic Period, when the super-continent Pangaea began to break apart. The area was inundated by the Neotethys Sea, and limestone formed from the marine sediments. During the early Cenozoic, the area was uplifted by the collision of the Eurasian Plate and the African and Adriatic plates. Once this occurred, the sinkholes and caves of the region were formed as rain seeped into the limestone. When the Lone and Ach valleys formed, access to the caves from the surface became possible, and the caves gradually dried out and filled in with sediment, preserving materials brought into the cave by humans.

The caves of the Swabian Jura are particularly famous for their high density of artifacts from the Aurignacian tradition, ranging from roughly 43,000 to 26,000 years ago. The Aurignacian tradition is characterized by the advent of symbolic communication (in the form of beads and pendants), specialized flint blades, and figurative art, all of which have been found in high numbers within these six caves. During this time, early modern humans migrated into Europe, probably from the southeast along the Danube River, and settled in the easily accessible caves in the area. There, they likely lived and worked in and around these caves. The caves also served as the repositories of the figurines which may have been used in a religious context. In addition, they were the venue where performers used the excavated musical instruments and where the social groups lived from which the artists sprang.

== Caves ==
| Picture of the cave | Name | Location | Description | Discoveries | Picture of an important discovery |
|---|---|---|---|---|---|
| additional pictures | Bocksteinhöhle | Lone Valley (48.55424°N 10.15469°E) | Reaches 16 m (52 ft) deep and 9 m (30 ft) wide | Large Hand axe (known as the Bocksteinmesser) | Bocksteinmesser |
| additional pictures | Geißenklösterle | Ach Valley (48.39821°N 9.77138°E) | | Orans (hands upraised posture) half-animal/half-human figure in ivory | additional pictures |
| additional pictures | Hohle Fels | Ach Valley (48.37926°N 9.75409°E) | Entry corridor leads into large cavern measuring 500 m^{2} (5,400 ft^{2}) in surface area, with a height of 30 m (98 ft). | Hohlefels Venus of mammoth ivory, flute from a Griffon vulture bone. | additional pictures |
| additional pictures | Hohlenstein-Stadel | Lone Valley (48.54931°N 10.17294°E) | 50 m (160 ft) long, narrow cave. Entrance 8 m × 4 m (26 ft × 13 ft) wide by high. | Lion-man figure carved from mammoth ivory | additional pictures |
| additional pictures | Sirgensteinhöhle | Ach Valley (48.38704°N 9.76119°E) | Total length of the cave 42 m (138 ft) with a maximum height of 10 m (33 ft); in the rear the cavity is lit by natural openings in the ceiling. | Approx. 5000 flint points, awls and smoothing stones | additional pictures |
| additional pictures | Vogelherd Cave | Lone Valley (48.55865°N 10.19428°E) | Originally had 3 entrances, connect to one another by a corridor 40 m (130 ft) long and up to 7 m (23 ft) wide | Animal figure of mammoth ivory, venus figurine from a wild boar's tusk | additional pictures |
