= Quenstedtite =

Uncommon iron sulfate mineral

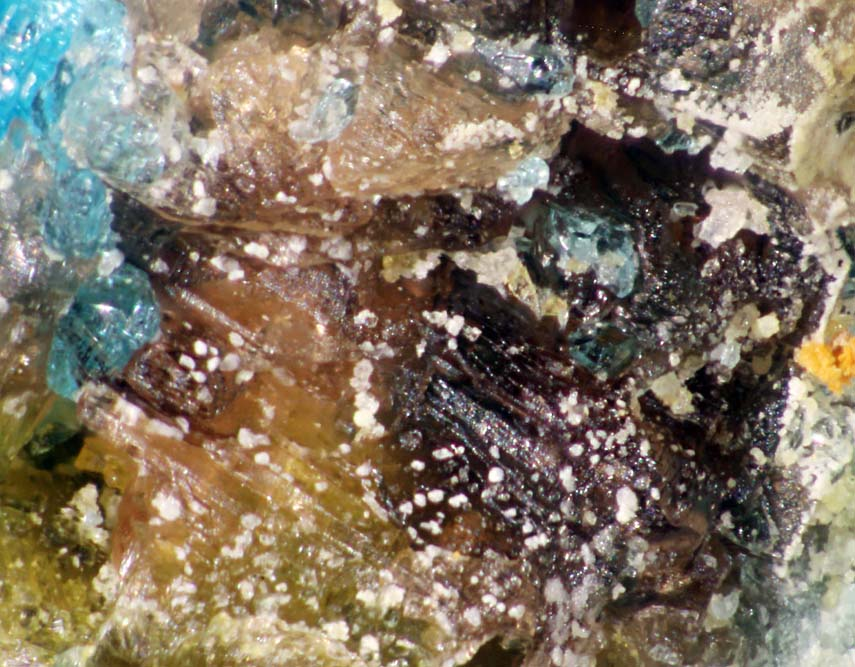

General
- Category: sulfate minerals
- Formula: Fe_{2}(SO_{4})_{3}·11H_{2}O
- IMA symbol: Qst
- Strunz classification: 7.CB.65
- Crystal system: Triclinic
- Crystal class: Pinacoidal (1̅) (same H-M symbol)
- Space group: P1̅
- Unit cell: a = 6.184 Å, b = 23.6 Å c = 6.539 Å; α = 94.18° β = 101.73°, γ = 96.27°; Z = 2

Identification
- Color: white to very pale violet to red-violet

Quenstedtite is an uncommon iron sulfate mineral with chemical formula Fe_{2}(SO_{4})_{3}·11H_{2}O. It forms violet or white triclinic crystals. Found in oxidized zones of pyrite-rich orebodies, especially in arid climates. It was first reported in 1888 for an occurrence in Tierra Amarilla, Copiapó Province, Atacama Region, Chile and named by G. Linck in 1889 for the German mineralogist F. A. von Quenstedt (1809–1889).
