= Vogelherd Cave =

Cave in Niederstotzingen, Germany

- Vogelherdhöhle
- Vogelherd
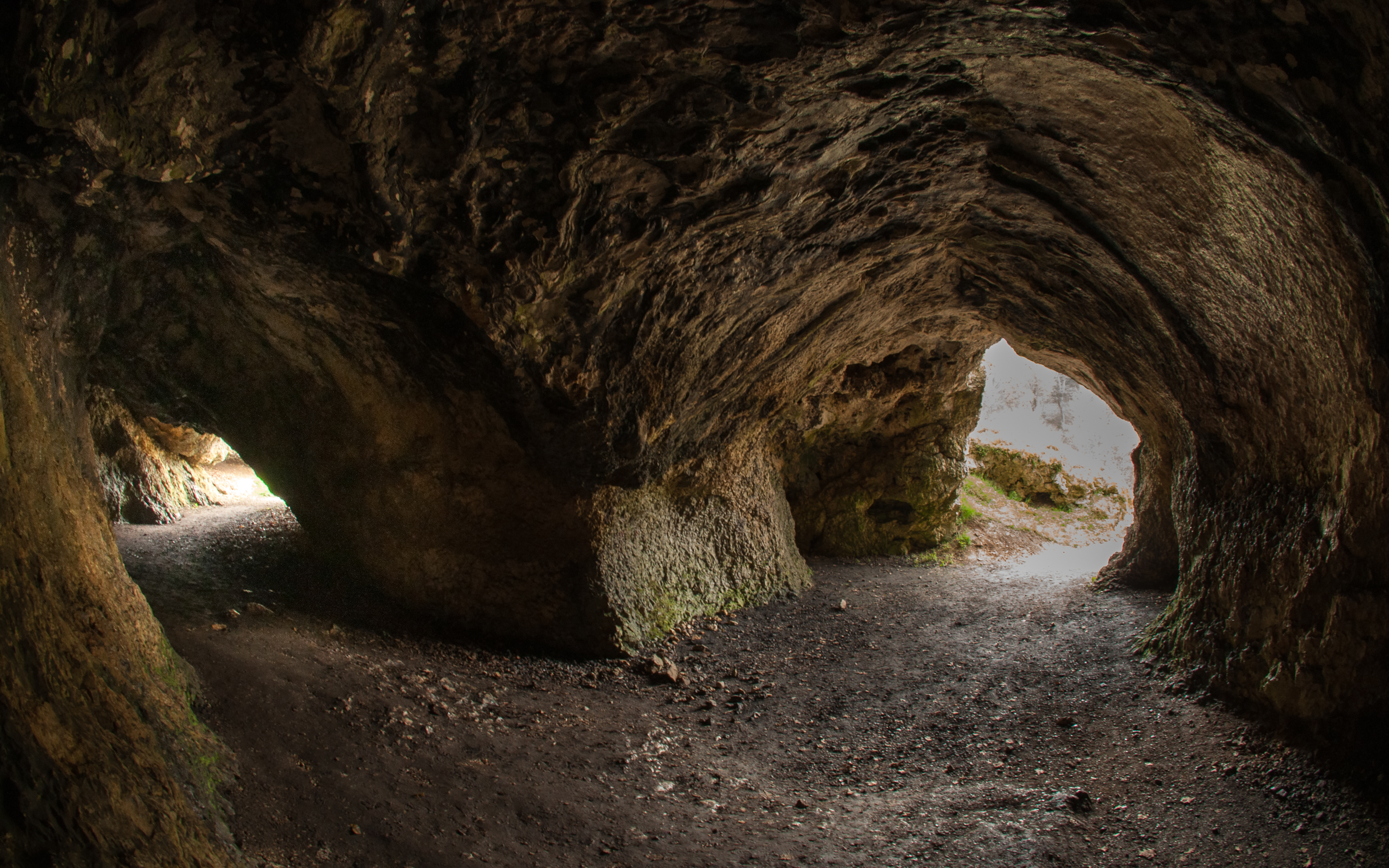
- Vogelherd Cave interior

- Location in Germany Vogelherd Cave (Baden-Württemberg)
- 48°33′31″N 10°11′39″E
- Type: karst cave
- Periods: Upper Palaeolithic
- Cultures: Aurignacian
- Associated with: paleo-humans
- Location: Archäopark Vogelherd, Stetten ob Lontal
- Region: Swabian Jura, Baden-Württemberg, Germany

Site notes
- Material: limestone Karst
- Length: 40 m (130 ft)
- Area: 170 m^{2} (1,800 sq ft)
- Excavation dates: 1931, 2005 to 2012
- Archaeologists: Gustav Riek
- Website: Archäopark Vogelherd

UNESCO World Heritage Site
- Official name: Caves and Ice Age Art in the Swabian Jura
- Type: Cultural
- Criteria: iii
- Designated: 2017 (41st session)
- Reference no.: 1527
- Region: Europe and North America

The Vogelherd Cave (German: Vogelherdhöhle , or simply Vogelherd) is located in the eastern Swabian Jura, south-western Germany. This limestone karst cave came to scientific and public attention after the 1931 discovery of the Upper Palaeolithic Vogelherd figurines, attributed to paleo-humans of the Aurignacian culture. These miniature sculptures made of mammoth ivory rank among the oldest uncontested works of art of mankind. Because of the cultural importance of these sculptures and the cave's testimony to the development of Paleolithic art and culture, in 2017 the site became part of the UNESCO World Heritage Site called Caves and Ice Age Art in the Swabian Jura.

== Location ==
The site is located on the edge of the valley of the river Lone near Stetten ob Lontal, part of Niederstotzingen in the eastern Swabian Jura, Baden-Württemberg, southern Germany. It is not publicly accessible, but since 2013 has been embedded in the Archäopark Vogelherd that includes a museum and a visitor center.

The cave is located on a hill 20 m (66 ft) above the river Lone with a 180 degree view over the valley. The Y-shaped cave occupies about 170 m^{2} (1,800 sq ft) and had an initial height of three to four meters. There are three entrance holes. Two large, 2.5 to 3.5 meter high entrance holes are connected by an approximately 40 m (130 ft) long curved gallery – called the "Big Cave". The second gallery, the "Small Cave", is of the same length but very narrow, the entrance being too small to be used. A passage between the two caves is except for a tiny gap at the top completely filled with debris and sediment deposits.

== Discovery and excavation ==
On 23 May 1931 amateur archeologist Hermann Mohn unearthed a number of flintstone flakes while examining a badger's den. He informed the University of Tübingen. Excavations in the cave were undertaken in the same year by paleo-historian Gustav Riek from Tübingen over the course of three months from 15 July until 1 October 1931. Human occupation of the site was documented, as sediments from the Palaeolithic to the Bronze Age yielded tools and artefacts. The excavation also yielded several figurines of 5 to 10 cm length carved from mammoth ivory, found in an Aurignacian layer (see below). They featured ornamentation like dots, lines and x-shaped markings. These seem to be not an attempt to depict actual surface features of the creature in question, but may well be of a ritual or even religious character.

Riek's excavation completely cleared out all the sediments from inside the cave. More excavations at the cave began in the summer of 2005, conducted by the Institut für Ur- und Frühgeschichte of the University of Tübingen. The target was the waste material of Riek's dig, heaped in front of the cave entrance. With more modern methods and technology, a large number of findings were discovered. These included (on 22 June 2006) the mammoth figurine described below.

Due to the large number of discoveries, the excavations went on much longer than expected. Until 2012, each year digging continued for five to nine weeks. A total of around 90% of the waste heap has been examined. The findings include a total of 217,000 stone artefacts of various sizes. There are also 479 kg of bones (plus 235 kg of burned bones), mostly from hunted animals. Among 28 kg of mammoth ivory are 326 pierced pendants/pieces of jewelry. 1,713 tools made from bone, antlers or ivory and 64 broken pieces of ivory were found, the later definitely part of some form of figurative art. An additional 112 fragments were likely part of figures. Various pieces of flutes (made from bird bones and ivory) were also found.

== Stratigraphy ==
Riek defined nine cultural horizons. The oldest scattered objects – stone artifacts – date back to the Middle Paleolithic – older than 40,000 years, representing traces and remains of occasional occupation by late Neanderthals.

Although hundreds of tools and artifacts made of stone, bone, ivory and antler are documented in all sediment layers beginning in the Eemian (ca. 130,000 years ago) to the top strata of the Bronze Age, human fossil discoveries are rare and most are attributed to the late Neolithic (ca. 5,000 years ago).

=== Middle Paleolithic ===
- Mousterian VII

Layer Mousterian VII contained a hand axe shaped, broad fragment of yellow and white silex, a brown and grey silex tip which has been retouched on one side, a hollowed-out tip of grey-yellow silex; a total of three curved scrapers and two straight scrapers. Furthermore, an upper jaw fragment of a wild horse was found, of which five incisors have been preserved.

=== Upper Paleolithic ===
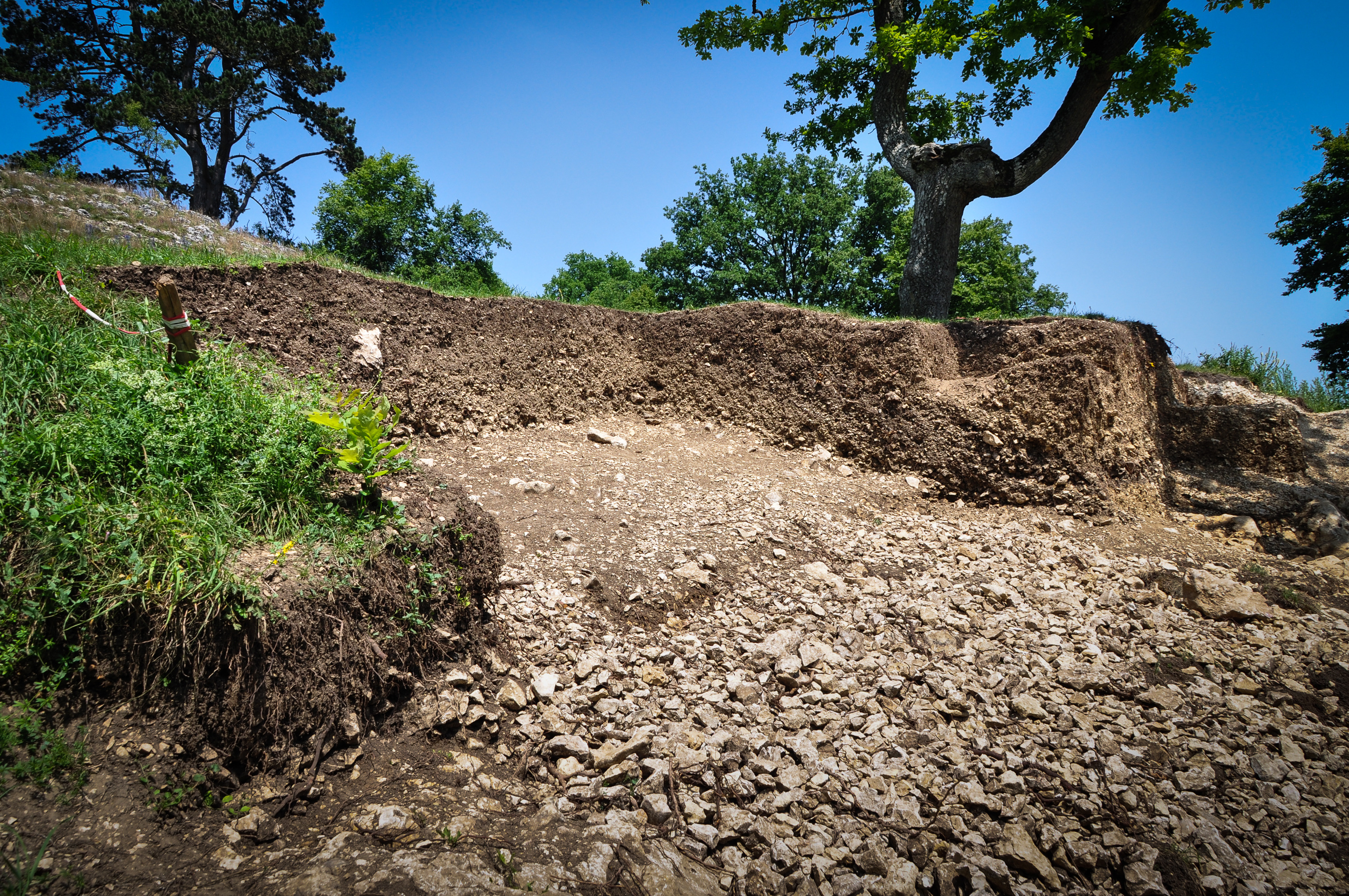
Excavation in 2012

Frequent and widespread occupation took place during the Upper Palaeolithic – between 40,000 and 10,000 years ago – the Aurignacian deposits offer the primary source of information, the Gravettian is not present. Organic objects, fireplaces and missile tips were found.

- Aurignacian V

In layer Aurignacian V two independent fireplaces were found, one in the main hall, the other near the south-western entrance. A total of 910 stone tools were recorded, distributed mainly in the vicinity of these fireplaces, the most common items being scrapers and gouges. Numerous bone and ivory artifacts were discovered, among the most common objects of organic material are missile tips.

- Aurignacian IV

Gustav Riek dubbed this layer "Upper Aurignacian". Large-scale occupation in several settlement phases is documented. According to Riek's excavation report 1,729 stone artifacts and 82 organic artifacts were discovered. Among them were some pieces which were decorated by serrations. Of further interest are missile heads that are actually less frequent in this strata. However, one of these has a split base, four others have a solid base, and three are only fragmentary preserved as one of these fragments received lateral notches and X-marks.

- Magdalenian III

Stone artifacts were discovered in layer Magdalenian III. Among the finds are four blade knives, three blades, a gouge, and two lateral flakes and a fragment of a reindeer antler with several cut marks and cut faces.

- Magdalenian II

Layer Magdalenian II was rich in stone artifacts. These include eleven blades of varied quality and execution. Other finds include a reindeer's antler with a cut face and cut marks at the fork as well as an ivory palette with finely carved grooves.

== Vogelherd figurines ==
The Vogelherd figurines are some of the world's oldest-known works of figurative art, artefacts "made from the ivory of woolly mammoths" and "finely carved and exquisitely detailed." The 1931 excavation yielded 11 figurines, found in the Aurignacian layers.

Interpretations of the carvings have been made in the context of these animals' great importance for paleo-human survival and related hunting rituals and they may have served a purpose in pre-historic beliefs, cults and shamanistic practices.

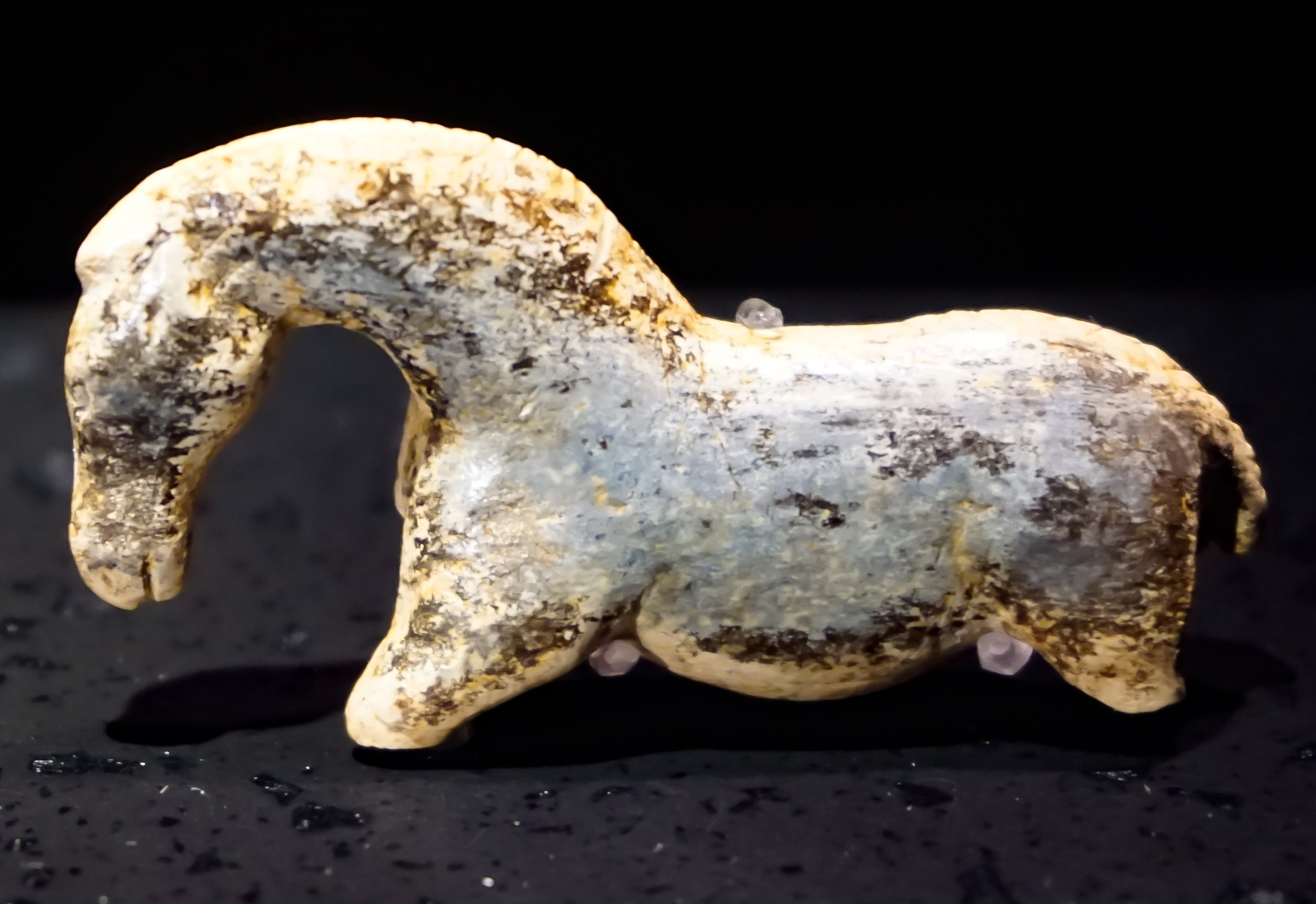
Wild horse

=== Sculpture of a horse ===
Length: 4.8 cm (ca. 30,000 – 29,000 years old)

"Exceptionally accurately shaped, perfect in form and remarkably expressive. Due to the curved neck, it is usually thought to represent a stallion with an aggressive or imposing bearing. Only the head is completely preserved. Due to the flaking of external ivory layers, the width has been reduced and the legs have broken off. There are engraved symbols, including cross marks and angular signs, on the back of the neck, as well as on the back and the left chest."

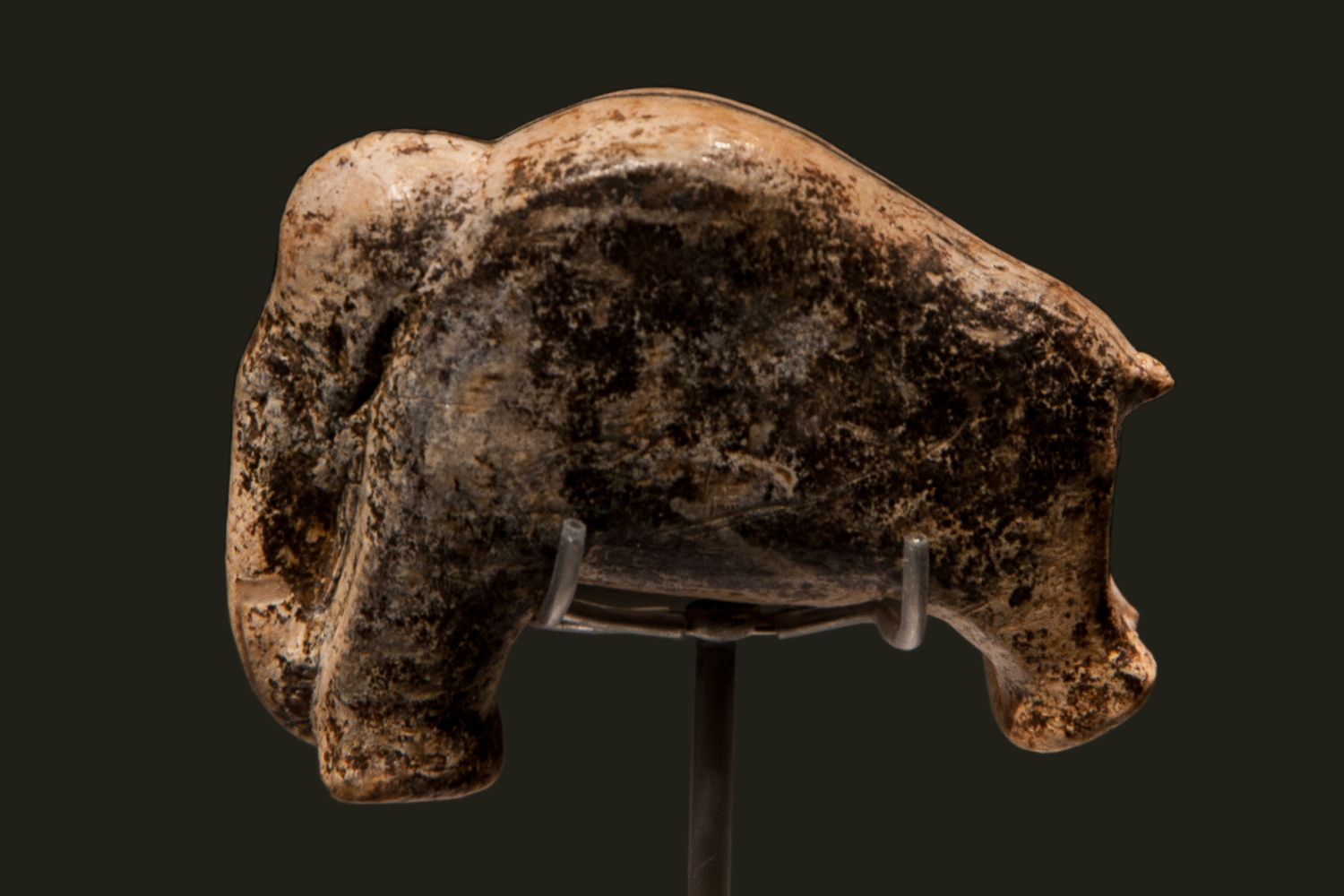
Woolly mammoth figurine

=== Sculpture of a woolly mammoth ===
Length: 3.7 cm (ca. 35,000 years old)

The entirely intact woolly mammoth figurine displays skilfully detailed carvings. It is unique in its slim form, pointed tail, powerful legs and dynamically arched trunk. It is decorated with six short incisions, and the soles of the pachyderm's feet show a crosshatch pattern.

In 2009, the figurine became the central exhibit of a large Landesausstellung.

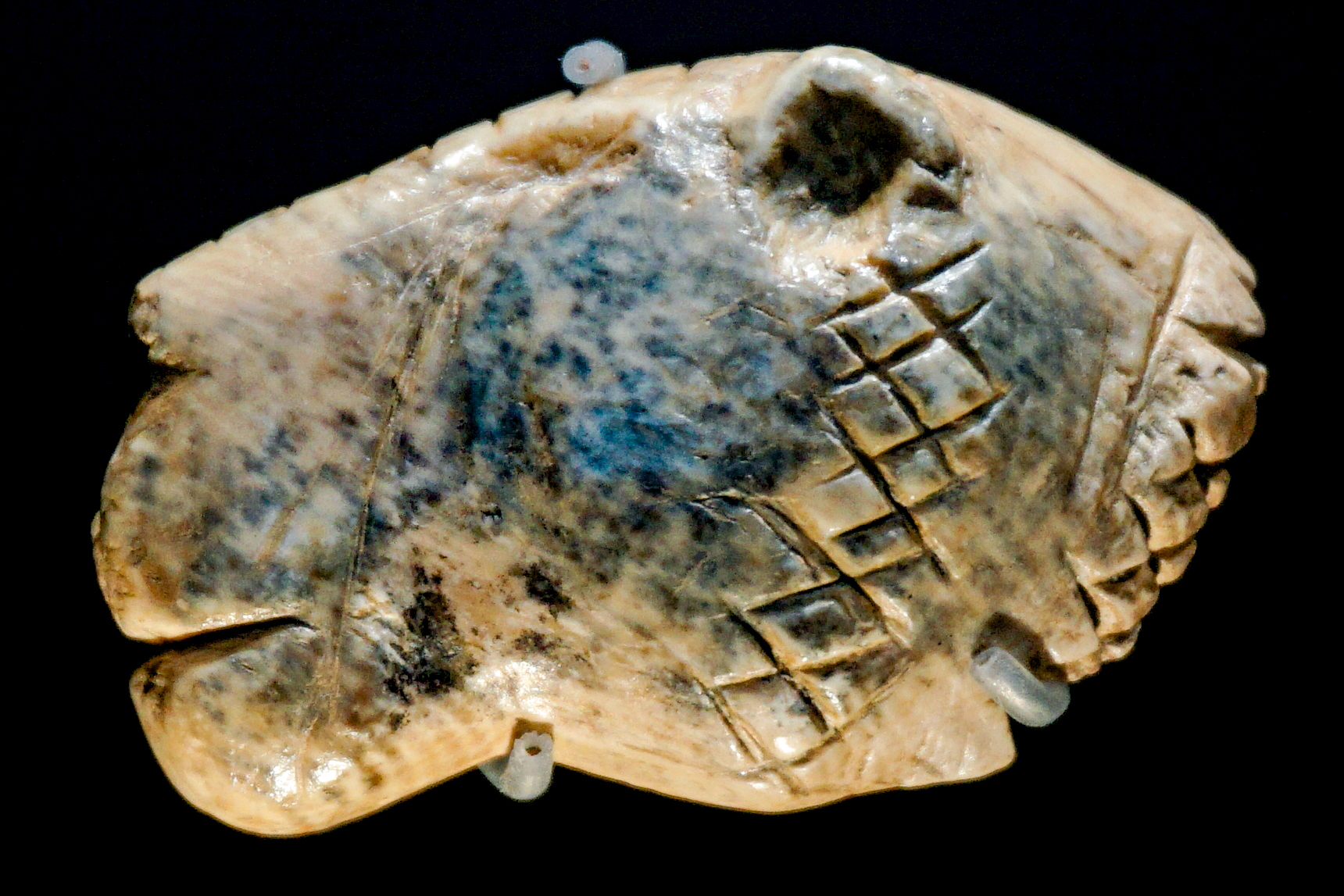
Cave lion head

=== Sculpture of a cave lion ===
Length: 5.6 cm (ca. 40,000 years old)

Found in 1931 with an incomplete head and thought to be a relief. The missing piece was found during the excavations between 2005 and 2012 and were successfully reattached, thus confirming that the figurine is in fact a three-dimensional sculpture. It is decorated with approximately 30 finely incised crosses on its spine.

=== Other figurines ===
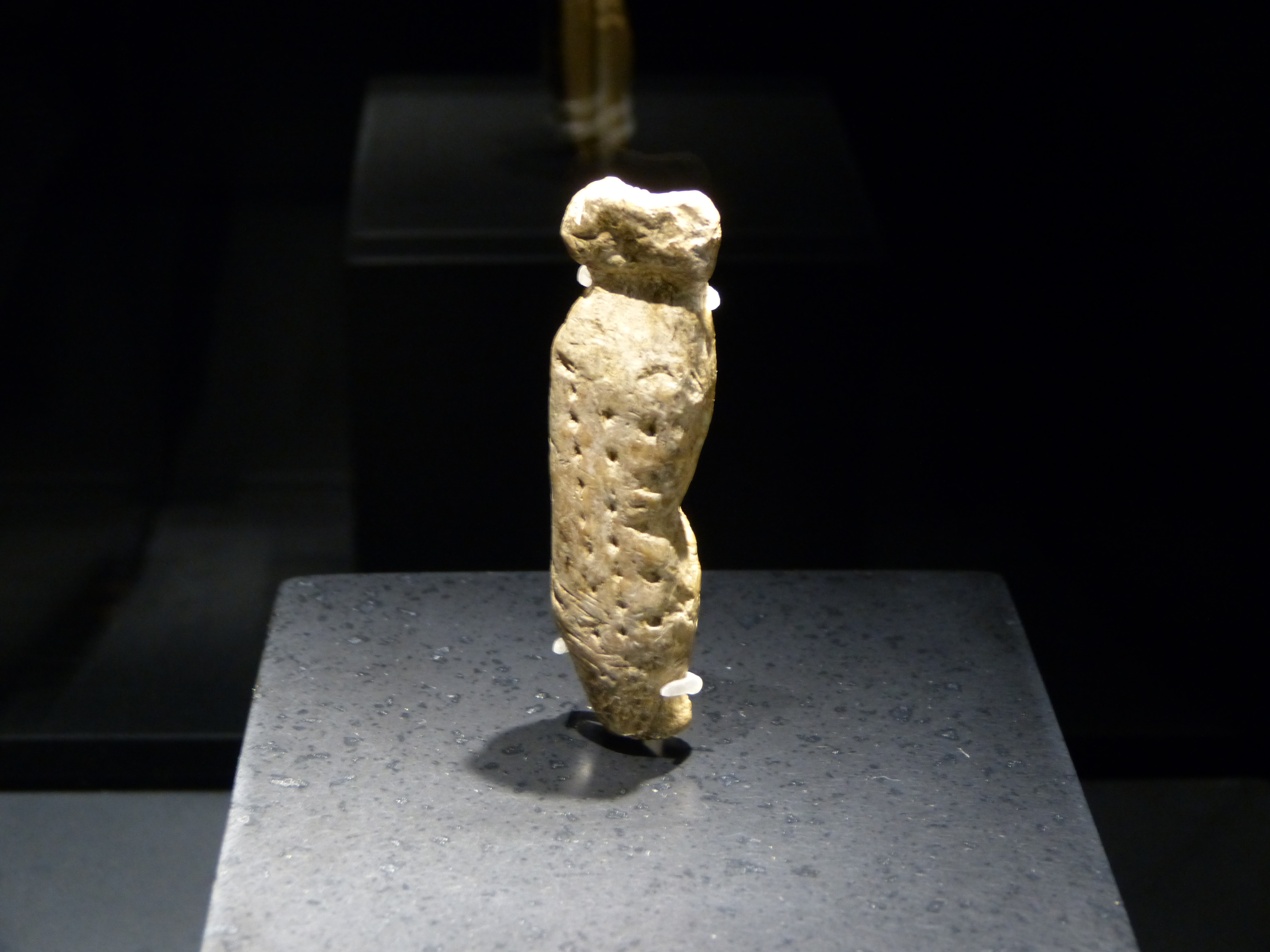
Human-like figure

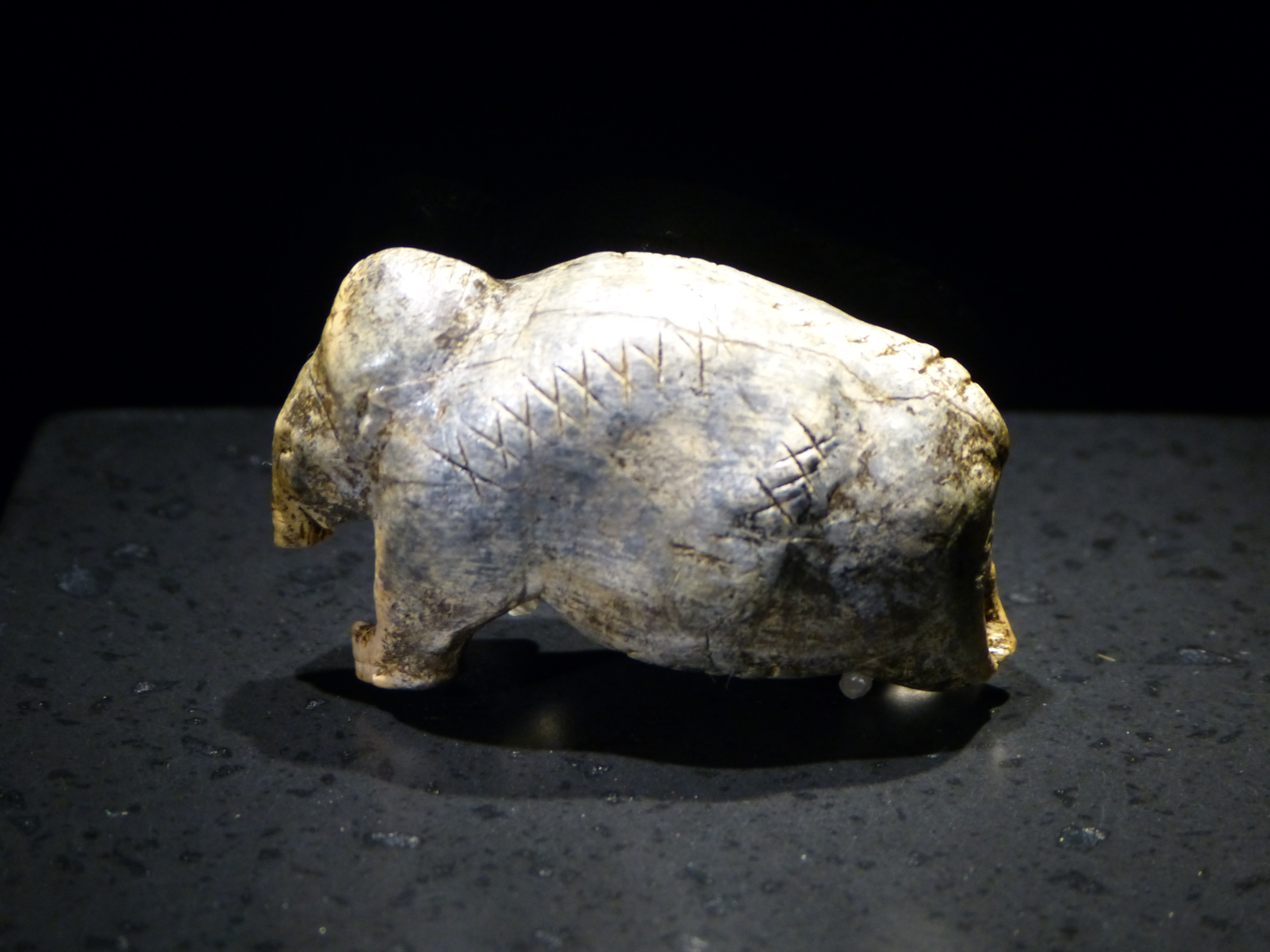
Woolly mammoth

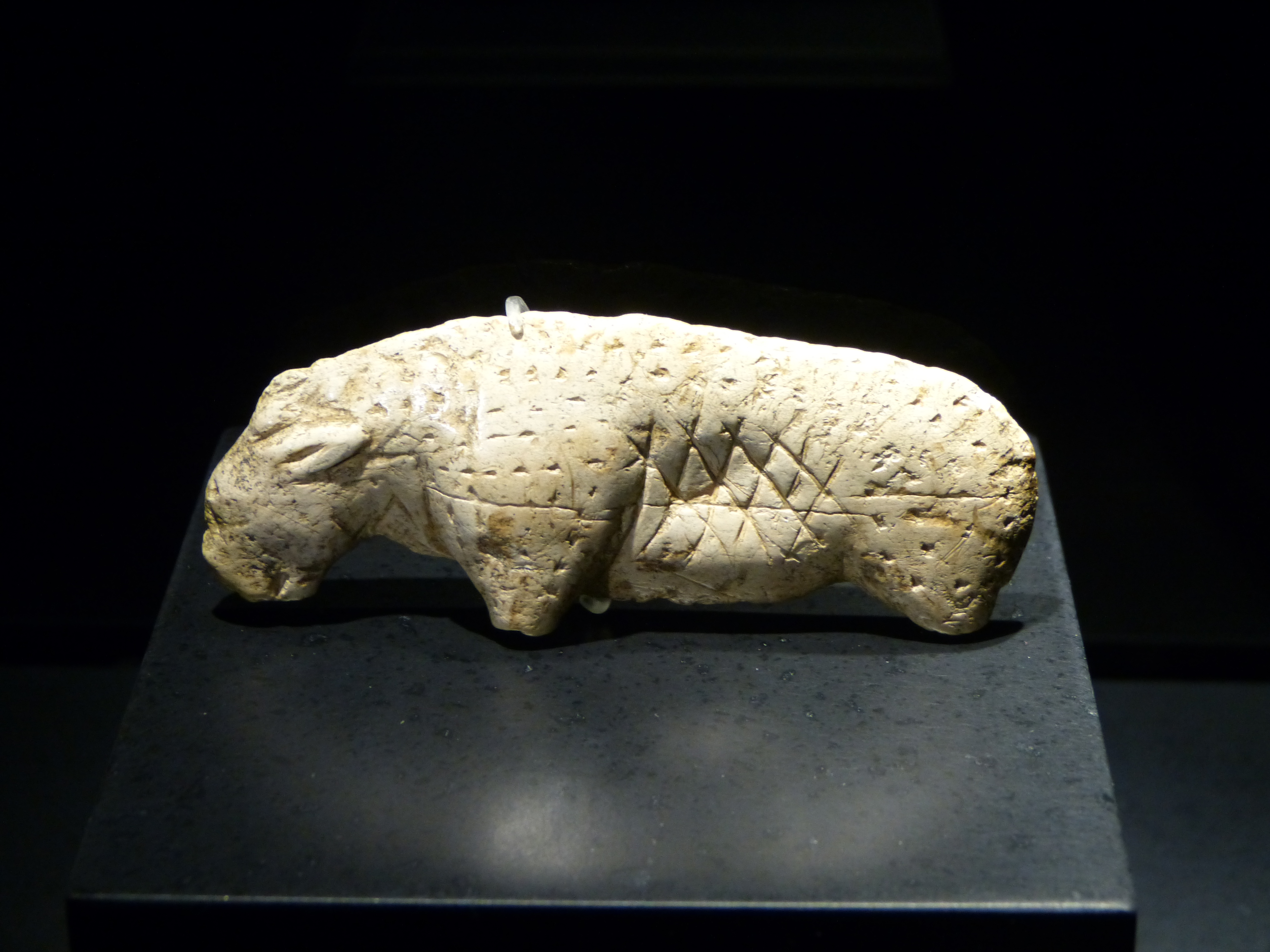
Half-sculpture of a cave lion

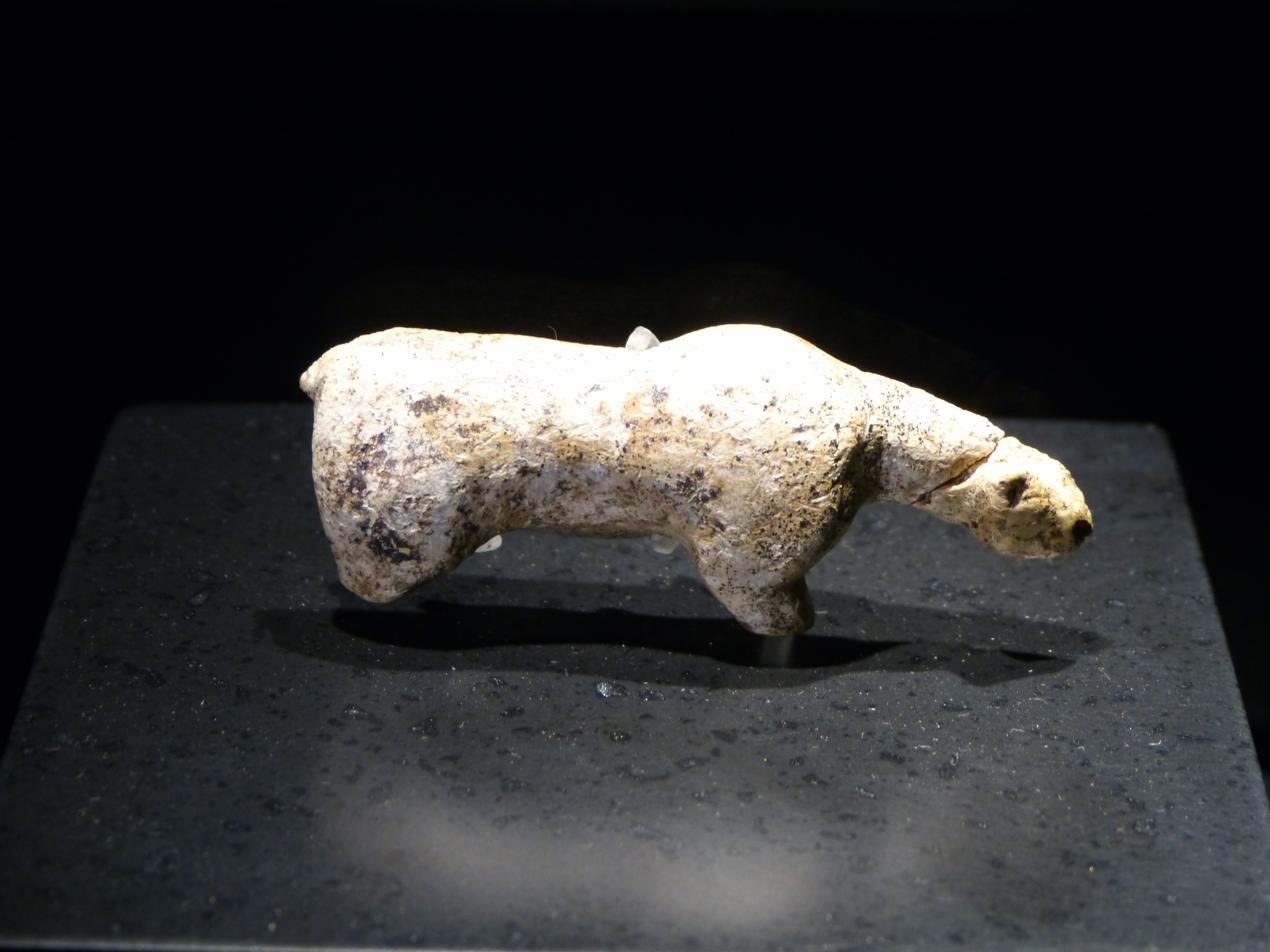
Lion or bear

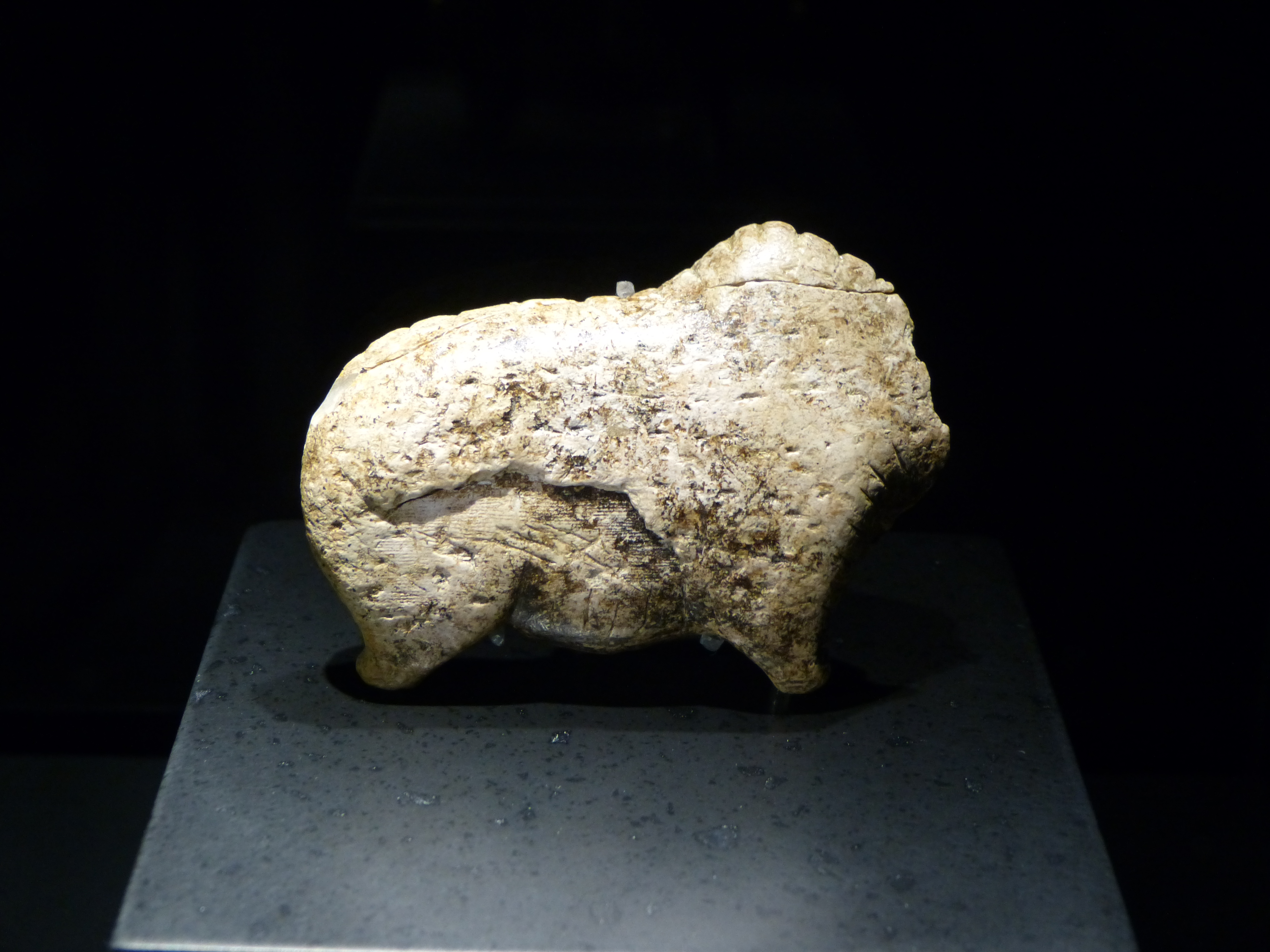
Bison

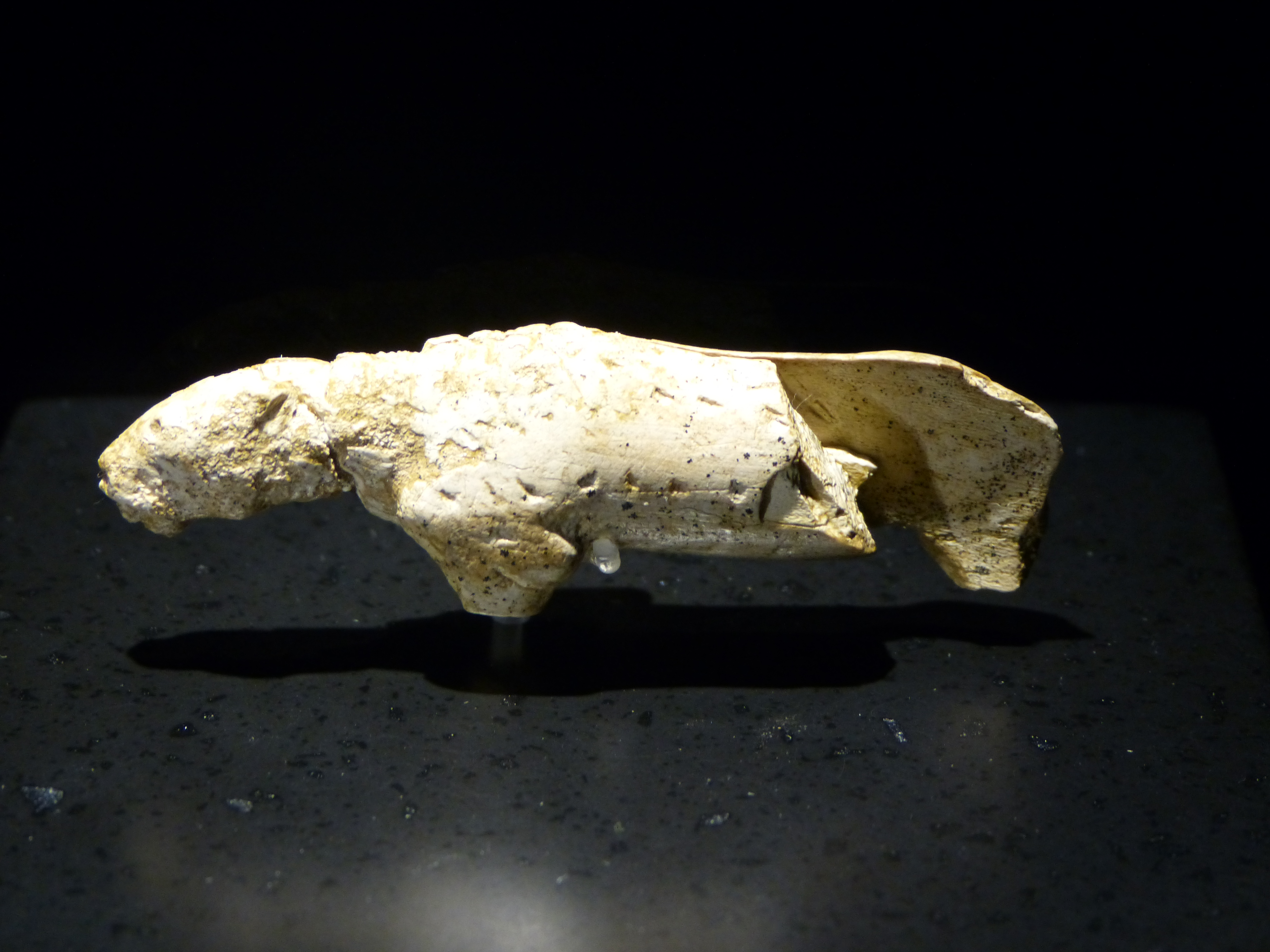
Lion

== The faunal assemblage ==
Among the faunal fossils of the Aurignacian, sixteen mammalian and seven avian taxa are represented. Reindeer and horse represent the primary prey. Although nearly equal in number, mammoth was according to the excavation data not actively hunted, but collected from natural death sites. Large bovid, red deer, wild boar, bison and chamois are also documented, but seem to have been secondary game. Small numbers of birds such as goose, ptarmigan, black grouse, and capercaillie suggest only occasional exploitation.

Moderate evidence of Middle Paleolithic presence of late Neanderthals suggests sporadic, non-frequent and seasonal occupation. Very few animal bones indicate regular intrusion of carnivores and bone dispersion by hyenas and wolves.

== UNESCO World Heritage Site ==
In January 2016, the federal government of Germany applied for the status of World Heritage Site for two valleys with six caves named Höhlen der ältesten Eiszeitkunst ("Caves with the oldest Ice Age art"). The site would encompass areas in the Lonetal (valley of the Lone) and the Achtal (valley of the Ach) both in the southern Swabian Jura. The former includes the caves Hohlenstein-Stadel, Vogelherd and Bocksteinhöhle, the latter Geissenklösterle, Hohle Fels and Sirgenstein Cave. Each valley would contain a core area of around 3 to 4 km (1.9 to 2.5 mi) length, surrounded by a buffer zone of a least 100 m (330 ft) width.

In the argument why these sites deserve recognition as a part of the universal human heritage, the area is described as the source of the currently oldest (non-stationary) works of human art in the form of carved animal and humanoid figurines as well as the oldest musical instruments. Their creators lived, were inspired and worked in and around these caves. The caves also served as the repositories of the figurines which may have been used in a religious context. In addition, they were the venue where performers used the excavated musical instruments and where the social groups lived from which the artists sprang.

The committee awarded the status of WHS in July 2017.

== See also ==
- Art of the Upper Paleolithic
- Bockstein Cave
- Brillenhöhle
