= Hürbe =

River in Germany

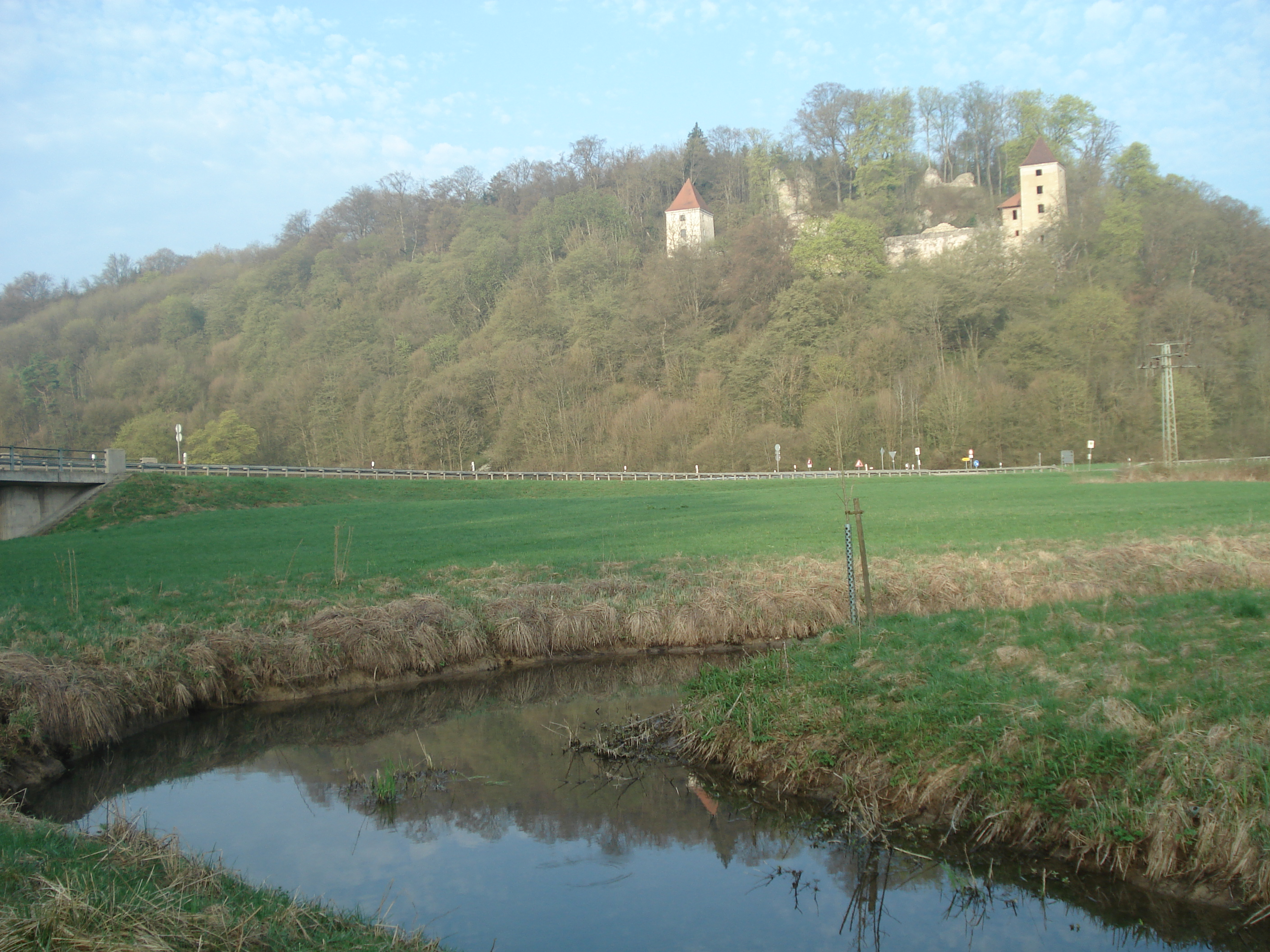

Location
- Country: Germany
- State: Baden-Württemberg

Physical characteristics
- Mouth
  - location: Brenz
  - coordinates: 48.5883°N 10.2669°E
- Length: 7.3 km (4.5 mi)
- Basin size: 327 km^{2} (126 sq mi)

Basin features
- Progression: Brenz→ Danube→ Black Sea
- Tributaries
  - right: Lone

Hürbe is a 7 km long river of Baden-Württemberg, Germany. It flows into the Brenz near Hermaringen.

== See also ==
- List of rivers of Baden-Württemberg
