= Stadtmuseum Erlangen =

Local history museum in Erlangen, Germany

Coordinates: 49°36′6.5″N 11°00′13″E

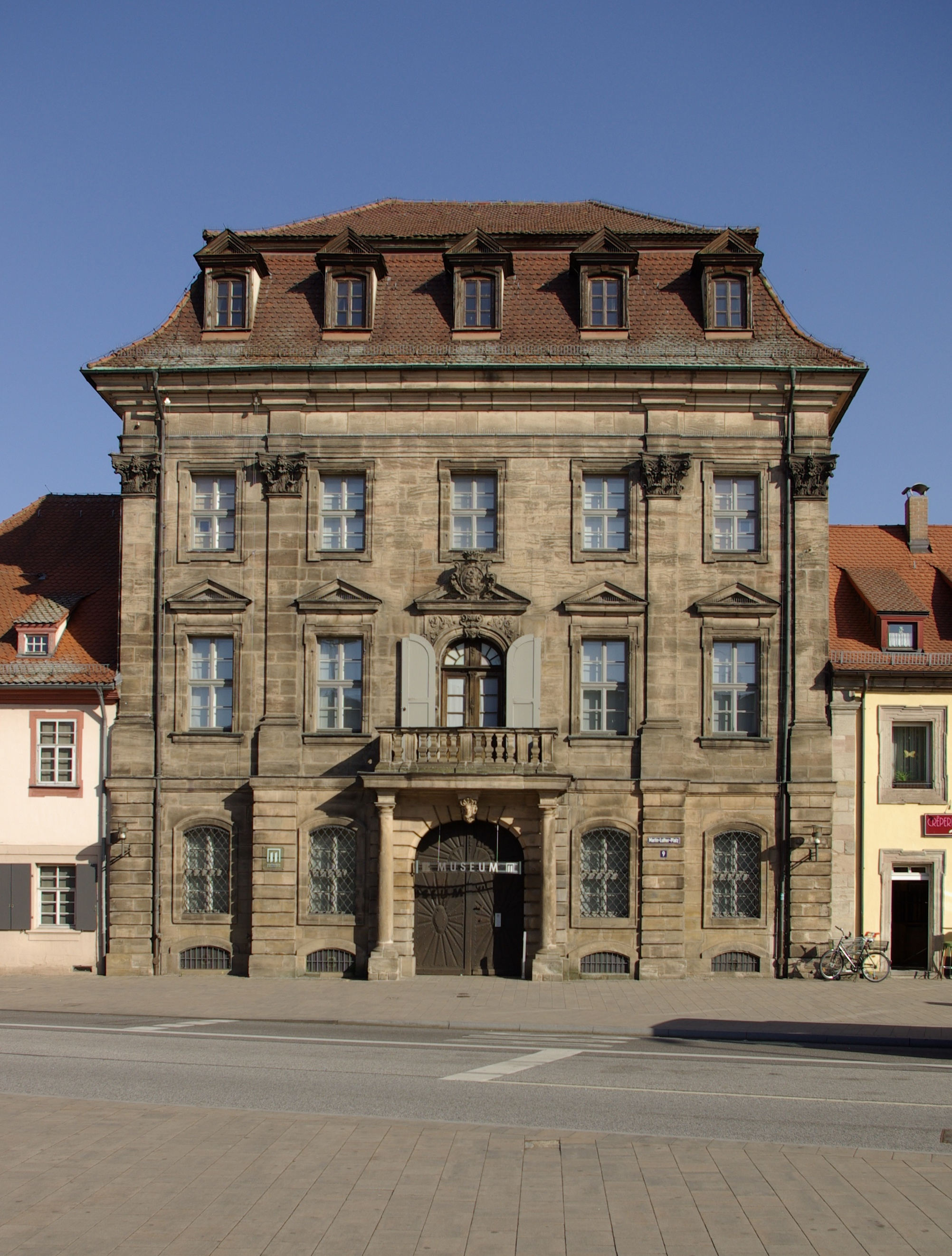
- Erlangen City Museum
- Established: 1919/1964
- Location: Martin-Luther-Platz 9, Erlangen
- Type: local history museum
- Director: Brigitte Korn
- Website: http://www.stadtmuseum-erlangen.de

Stadtmuseum Erlangen, or Erlangen City Museum, is a municipal museum dedicated to the history of the city of Erlangen, Germany. The museum is housed in the former Old Town 'Rathaus' (town hall), built in 1733/40, and an adjoining town house. Its courtyard serves as a venue for concerts, readings, film screenings, and other open-air events.

== History ==
Erlangen's first local history museum ('Heimatmuseum') was opened in 1919 in the former water tower (previously the university 'Karzer'). In 1964, the city museum was re-established and reopened in the former Old Town Hall under its current name.

== Exhibitions ==
The permanent exhibition documents the region's history from pre-historic times to the 20th century, with a focus on Erlangen's Baroque era with the erection of the planned New Town, its Huguenot manufacturies, the Margravial residence, and the founding of today's Friedrich-Alexander-Universität Erlangen-Nürnberg, Bavaria's second-biggest university. Other topics include the Industrial Age and the transformation of the city within the context of German history. The tour ends with Erlangen's development as a "Siemens town" following the end of World War II. The museum houses a significant collection on Huguenot trades (stocking weavers, glove makers, white tanners and carpet weavers).

Changing exhibitions cover a broad variety of topics, such as important events in the city's history, the history of science and medicine, and the visual arts.

== Gallery ==
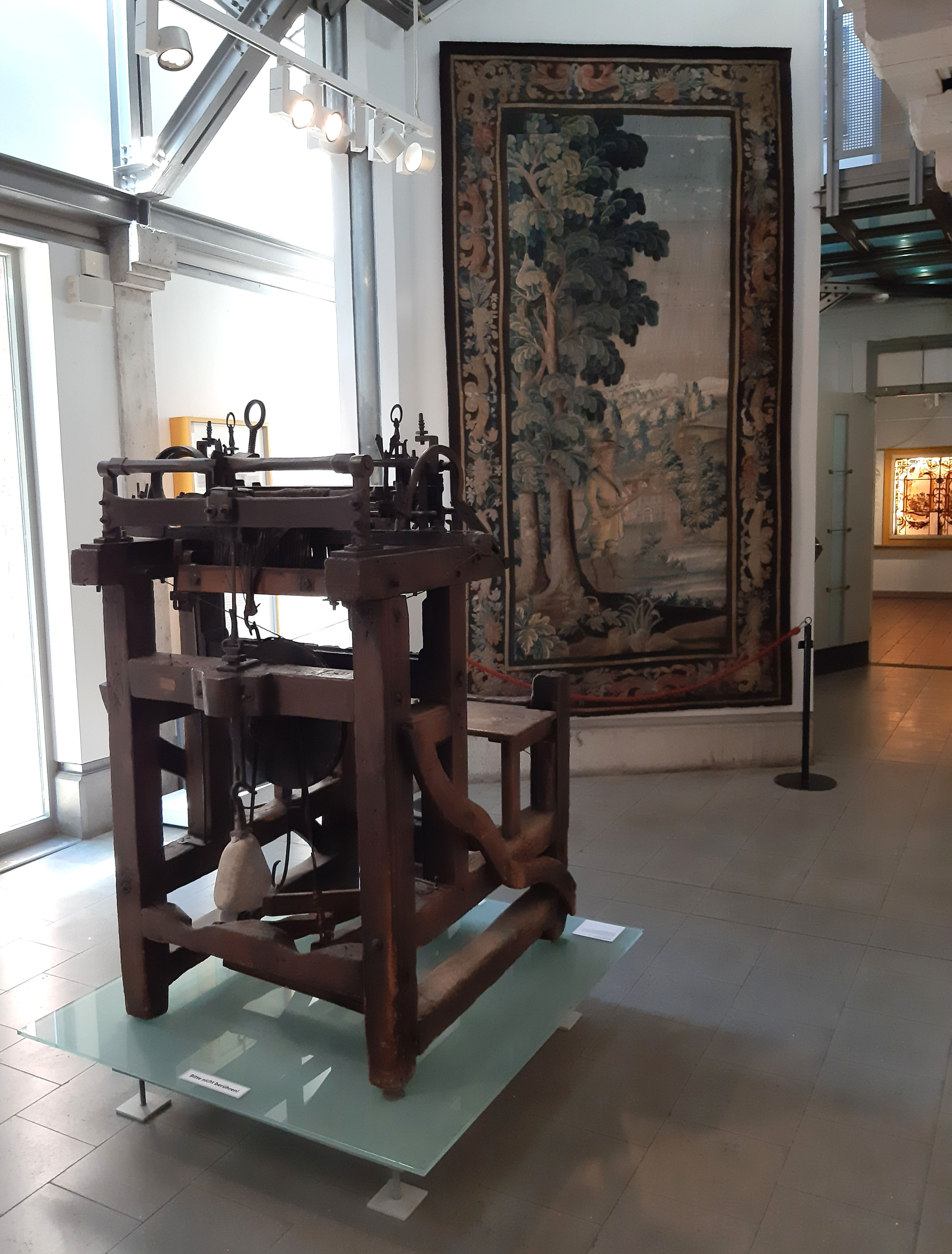
A hosier's stocking frame from the 18th century

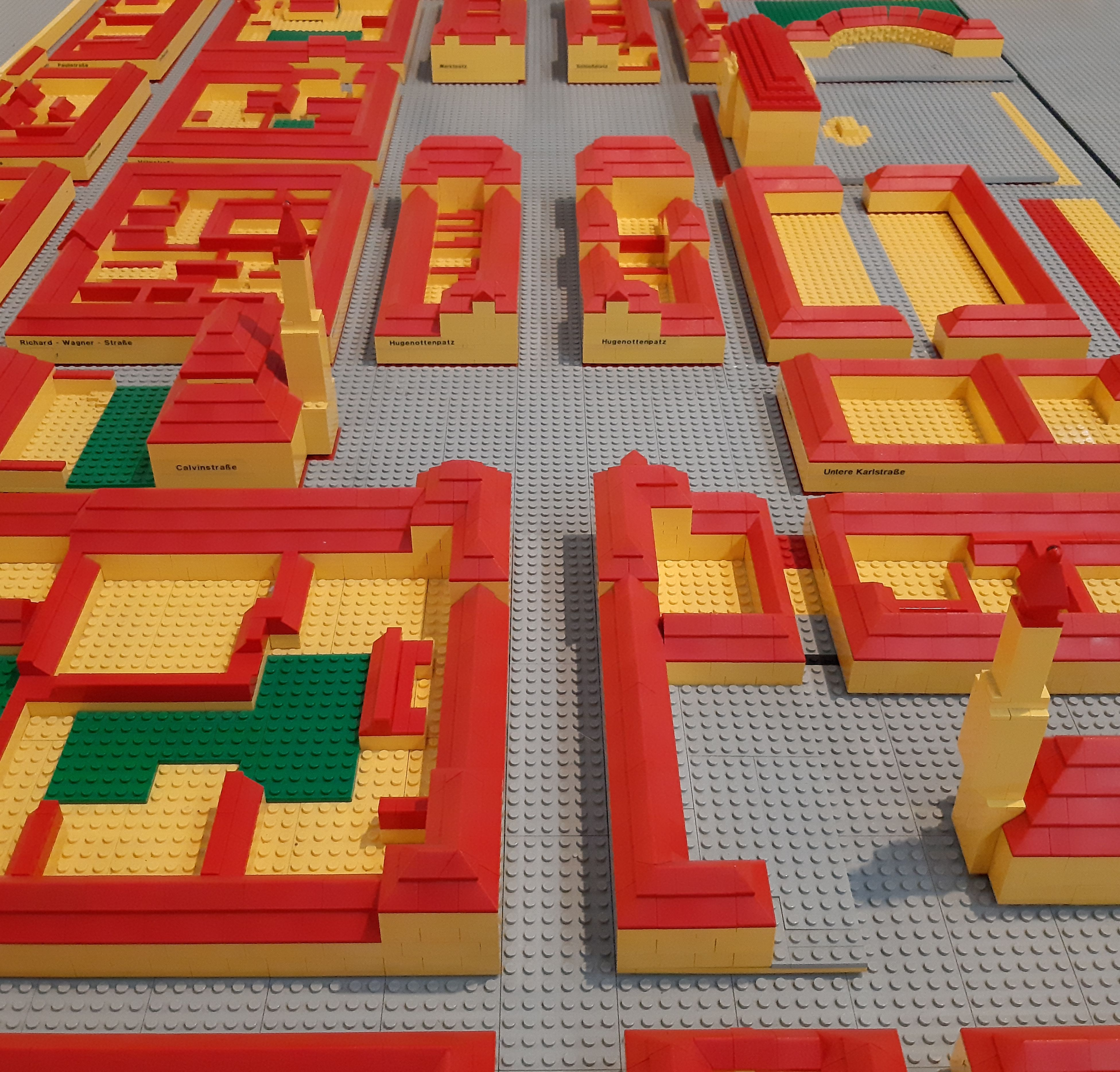
"Lego model" of the planned New Town

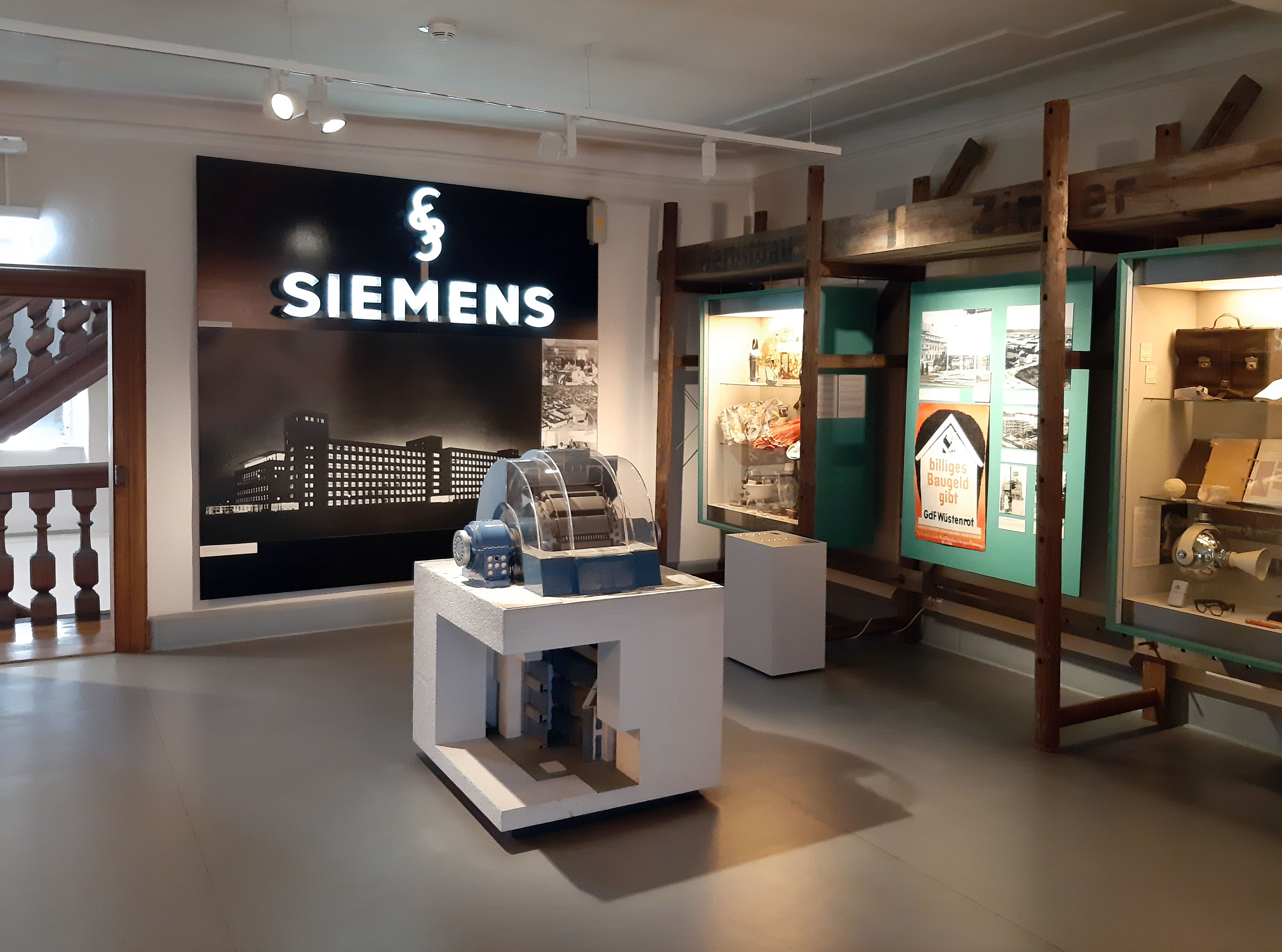
Exhibition area about Erlangen's post-war history

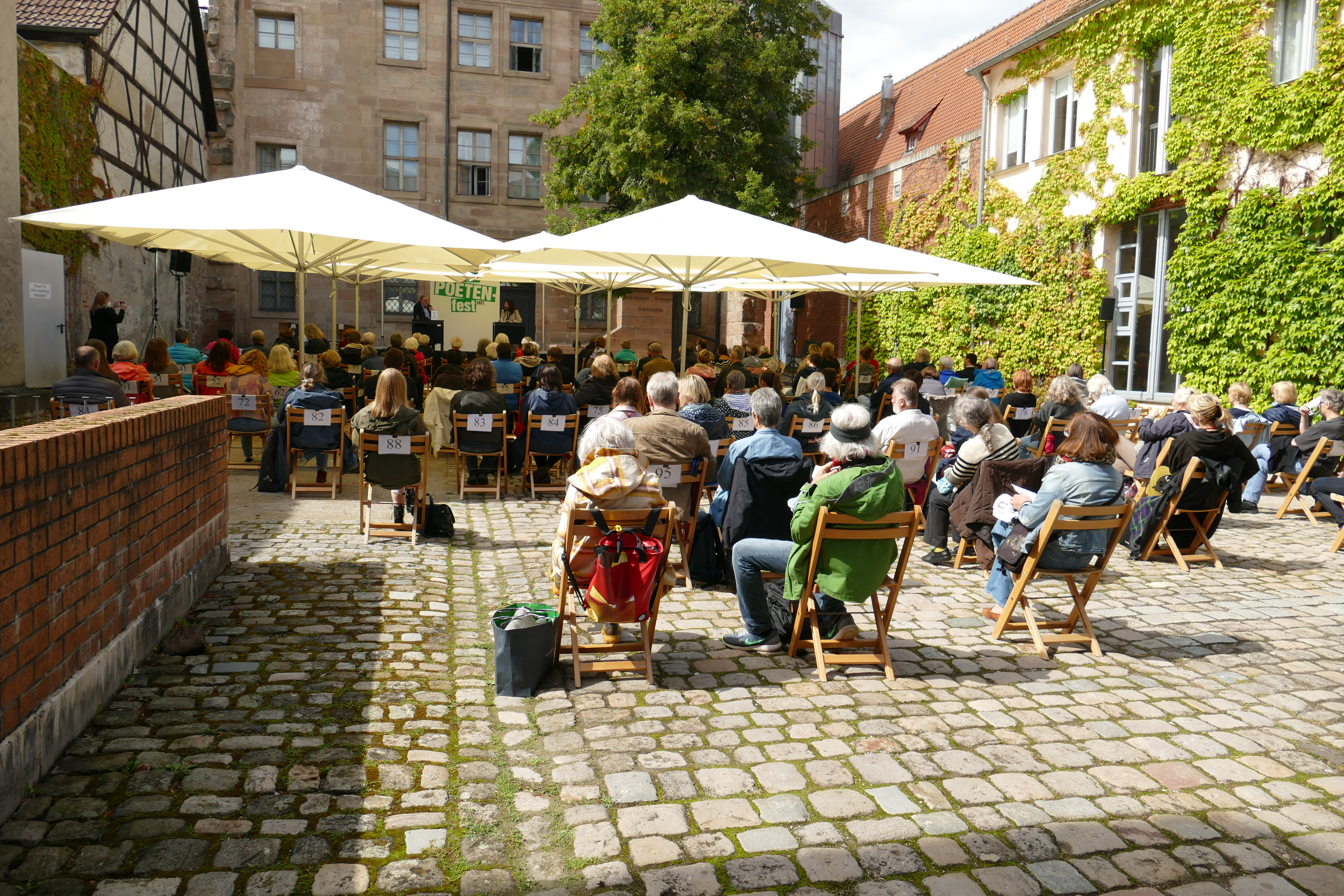
The museum's courtyard during Poetenfest
