= Lone (river) =

River in Germany

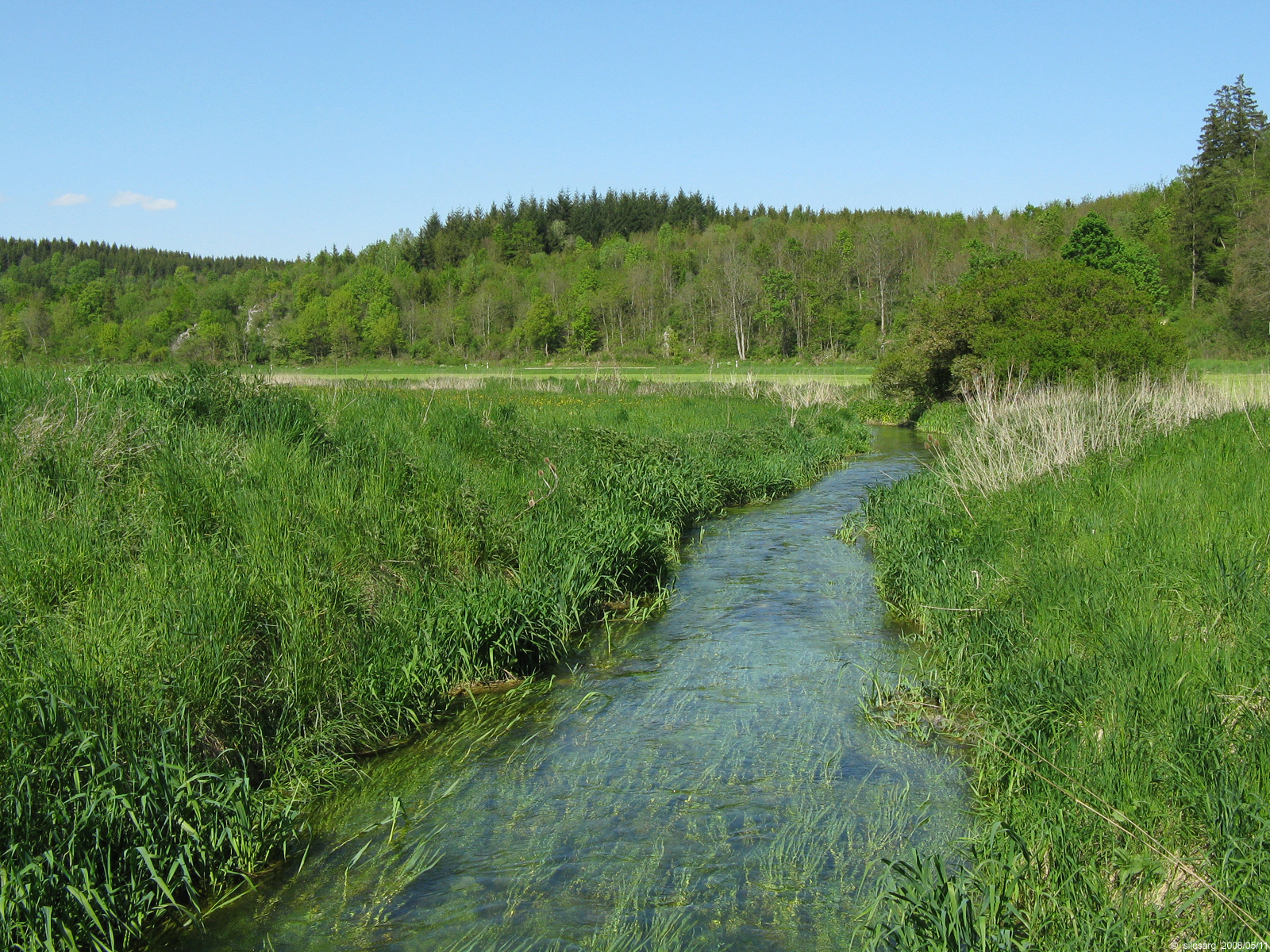

Location
- Country: Germany
- State: Baden-Württemberg

Physical characteristics
- Source
  - location: near Urspring, Lonsee
- Mouth
  - location: Hürbe
  - coordinates: 48.5815°N 10.2157°E
- Length: 37.8 km (23.5 mi)

Basin features
- Progression: Hürbe→ Brenz→ Danube→ Black Sea

The Lone is a river in Baden-Württemberg, Germany. It flows into the Hürbe river, a tributary of the Brenz, which in turn discharges into the Danube.

== Course ==
The Lone rises from a Karst spring with a large discharge near Urpsring, in the municipality of Lonsee, Baden-Württemberg. It flows southeast and then turns northeast. After around 37 km it flows into the Hürbe, which in turn is a tributary of the Brenz.

The valley of the Lone is fairly shallow, with rises of only around 50 m on both sides. The valley's width is up to 200 m. The flat valley floor is covered by meadows and fields, the slopes of reef limestone are mostly wooded. The karst on the slopes contains various caves and protuberances which were repeatedly visited by prehistoric hunter/gatherer groups as long ago as the Paleolithic and post-Ice Age Mesolithic.

Among these are the Bocksteinhöhle, Hohlenstein-Stadel and Vogelherd Cave, locations of important pre-historic findings.

== See also ==
- List of rivers of Baden-Württemberg
