= Joachim Hahn =

German archaeologist

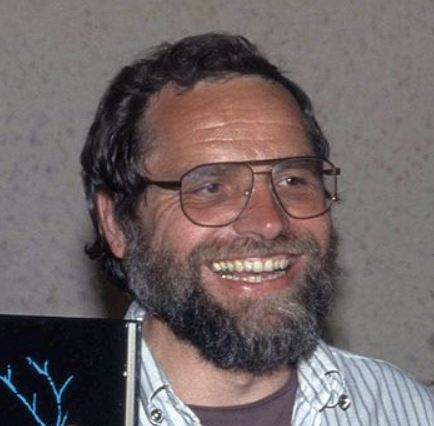
- Born: 12 August 1942; Dresden, Saxony, Germany
- Died: 27 April 1997 (aged 54)

Academic background
- Education: University of Cologne; University of Bordeaux; University of Tübingen

Academic work
- Discipline: Archaeology
- Sub-discipline: Prehistory; Upper Paleolithic
- Institutions: University of Tübingen

Joachim Hahn (12 August 1942 in – 27 April 1997) was a German archaeologist and expert on the Upper Paleolithic era.

Beginning in 1962, he studied at the University of Cologne, University of Bordeaux and the University of Tübingen. At the latter, he was promoted to research fellow in 1973. He published a thesis in 1977 at the University of Cologne, entitled "The Aurignacian in Central and Eastern Europe", and subsequently published several more papers.

Beginning in 1985, Hahn was a prehistory and early history professor and member of the Academic Council at the University of Tübingen, where he was promoted to adjunct professor in 1988. He was a guest teacher at the University of Michigan, the State University of New York, the University of Paris and the University of Zurich, as well as being active in research, excavation and public relations. He led excavations in the Ach Valley and the caves of the Swabian Alb, where important discoveries were made, and he worked with some of the oldest man-made works of art. His publications number over 100. In 1997, at age 54, he died of complications of cancer.

== Publications ==
- Eiszeithöhlen im Lonetal. Archäologie einer Landschaft auf der. Schwäb. Alb (mit Hansjürgen Müller-Beck und Wolfgang Taute), Müller und Gräff, Stuttgart 1973 (Führer zu vor- und frühgeschichtlichen Denkmälern in Baden-Württemberg, H. 3)
- Aurignacien. Das ältere Jungpaläolithikum in Mittel- und Osteuropa, Böhlau, Köln und Wien 1977 (Fundamenta. Reihe A, Bd. 9) ISBN 3-412-04376-1
- Archäologie des Jungpaläolithikums, Lassleben, Kallmünz 1982 (Der Speckberg bei Meilenhofen, Teil 2/Kataloge der Prähistorischen Staatssammlung, Nr. 20) ISBN 3-7847-5120-2
- Kraft und Aggression. Die Botschaft der Eiszeitkunst im Aurignacien Süddeutschlands? Archaeologica Venatoria 7, Tübingen 1986.
- Die Geißenklösterle-Höhle im Achtal bei Blaubeuren I. Forsch. u. Ber. Vor- u. Frühgesch. Bad.-Württ. 26, Stuttgart 1988
- Erkennen und Bestimmen von Stein- und Knochenartefakten. Einführung in die Artefaktmorphologie. Archaeologica Venatoria 10, Tübingen 1991.
- Eiszeitschmuck auf der Schwäbischen Alb. Ulm 1992.
