= Konrad Gehringer =

German inventor, mechanic, and bus driver

Konrad Gehringer (4 June 1939 – 12 December 2003) was a German car mechanic and bus driver who had a one-man operation for producing electronic organs in Pforzheim, Germany.

Gehringer was best known as the inventor and developer of the one-man submersible Speleonaut, the first submarine designed for cave diving. The Speleonaut was designed in collaboration with Gehringer's friend, the cave diver Jochen Hasenmayer, who has used it since 1996 to explore the Blautopf cave system.
