= Aborichthys cataracta =

Scientific classification
- Kingdom: Animalia
- Phylum: Chordata
- Class: Actinopterygii
- Order: Cypriniformes
- Family: Nemacheilidae
- Genus: Aborichthys
- Species: A. cataracta

Binomial name
- Aborichthys cataracta Arunachalam, Raja, Malaiammal & Mayden, 2014

Species of fish

Aborichthys cataracta is a species of stone loach endemic to streams joining the Ranga River in Upper Subansiri district, India. This fish grows to a length of 9.3 centimetres (3.7 in) SL.
