= Faulenbach =

River in Germany

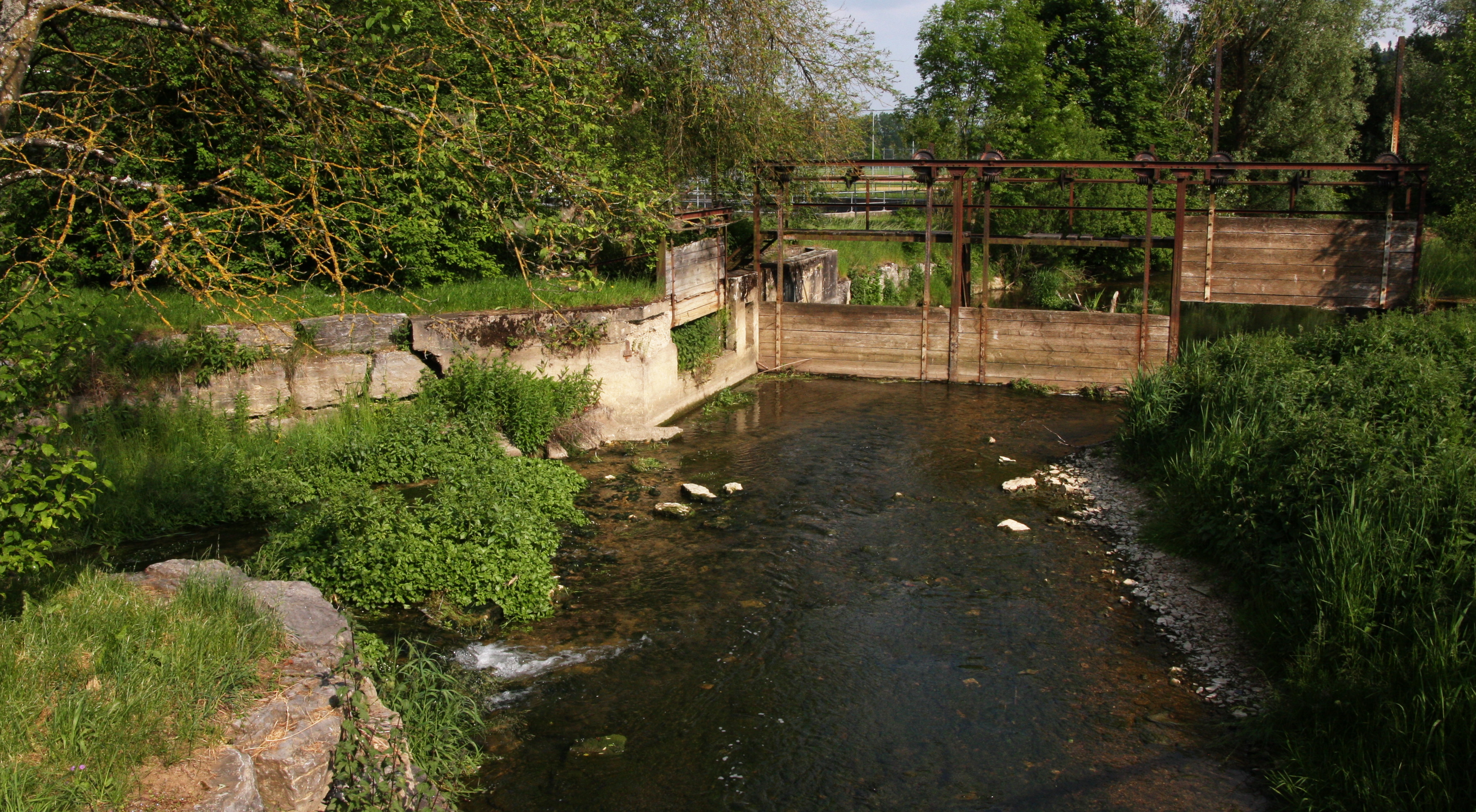

Location
- Country: Germany
- State: Baden-Württemberg

Physical characteristics
- Mouth
  - location: Elta
  - coordinates: 47.9971°N 8.7799°E

Basin features
- Progression: Elta→ Danube→ Black Sea

Faulenbach is a river in Baden-Württemberg, Germany. It flows into the Elta in Wurmlingen.

== See also ==
- List of rivers of Baden-Württemberg
