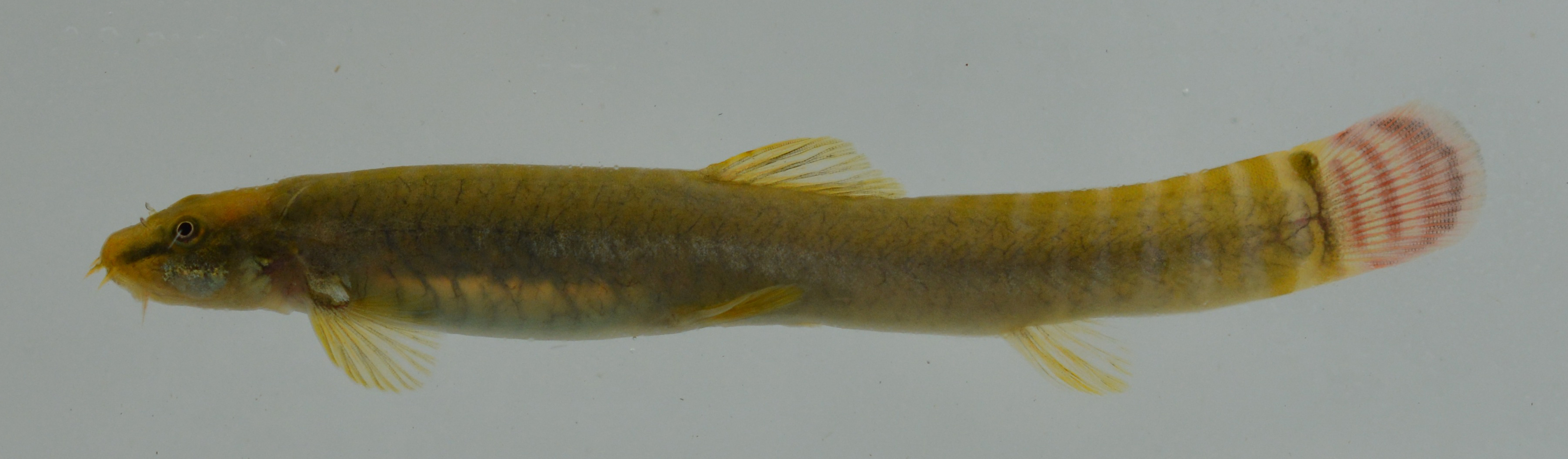

Conservation status
- Least Concern (IUCN 3.1)

Scientific classification
- Kingdom: Animalia
- Phylum: Chordata
- Class: Actinopterygii
- Order: Cypriniformes
- Family: Nemacheilidae
- Genus: Aborichthys
- Species: A. elongatus

Binomial name
- Aborichthys elongatus Hora, 1921

Synonyms
- Noemacheilus elongatus (Hora, 1921)

= Aborichthys elongatus =

Species of fish

Aborichthys elongatus is a species of freshwater fish in the stone loach family. A. elongatus can be found in North Bengal as well as Arunachal Pradesh in India.
