= Barbatula cobdonensis =

Conservation status
- Least Concern (IUCN 3.1)

Scientific classification
- Kingdom: Animalia
- Phylum: Chordata
- Class: Actinopterygii
- Order: Cypriniformes
- Family: Nemacheilidae
- Genus: Barbatula
- Species: B. cobdonensis

Binomial name
- Barbatula cobdonensis (Gundriser, 1973)

Synonyms
- Nemacheilus cobdonensis Gundriser, 1973

Species of fish

Barbatula cobdonensis is a species of freshwater ray-finned fish belonging to the family Nemacheilidae, the stone loaches. This loach is found in the lakes Khintiktig-Khol and Ak-Khol and in the Mogen-Buren River all within the drainage basin of the Kobdo River in northwestern Mongolia and the Tuva Republic in Russia. This taxon is placed with some uncertainty within the genus Barbatula as a species inquirenda, or it may be a junior synonym of B. compressirostris.
