= Schönbach =

Schönbach may refer to:

== People ==
- Kay-Achim Schönbach, German vice-admiral

== Places ==
- Schönbach, Austria, in Lower Austria
- Schönbach, Saxony, in the district Löbau-Zittau, Saxony, Germany
- Schönbach, Sebnitz, a former municipality in Saxony, now part of the town Sebnitz, Germany
- Schönbach, Rhineland-Palatinate, in the district Vulkaneifel, Rhineland-Palatinate, Germany
- Schönbach, the German name for Meziboří, in Ústí nad Labem Region, Czech Republic
- Schönbach, the German name for Luby (Cheb District), Czech Republic
- Schönbach bei Asch, the German name for Krásná (Cheb District), Czech Republic
- Schönbach, the German name for Zdislava (Liberec District), Liberec District, Czech Republic
- Schönbach (river), a river of Baden-Württemberg, Germany, tributary of the Elta
