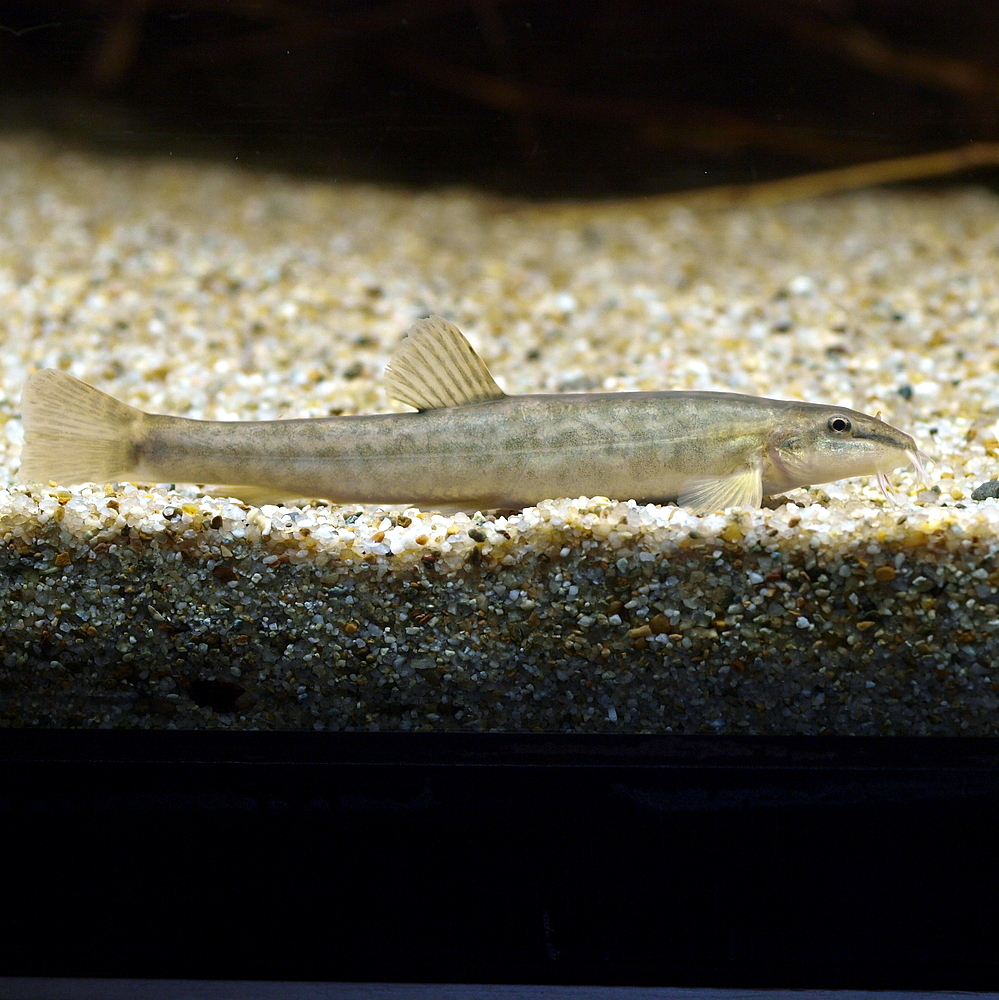
- Barbatula barbatula

Scientific classification
- Kingdom: Animalia
- Phylum: Chordata
- Class: Actinopterygii
- Division: Teleostei
- Order: Cypriniformes
- Family: Nemacheilidae
- Genus: Barbatula; H. F. Linck, 1790

Type species
- Cobitis barbatula Linnaeus, 1758

Synonyms
- Cobites Swainson, 1839; Orthrias Jordan & Fowler, 1903

= Barbatula =

Genus of fishes

Barbatula is a genus of fish in the family Nemacheilidae native to Europe and Asia. They are found in streams, rivers and lakes, and the genus also includes Europe's only cavefish, which only was discovered in the Danube–Aachtopf system in Germany in 2015.

Barbatula formerly included many more species, but these have been moved to other genera, notably Oxynoemacheilus.

== Species ==
These are the currently recognized species in this genus:

- Barbatula altayensis S. Q. Zhu, 1992
- Barbatula barbatula (Linnaeus, 1758) (Stone loach)
- Barbatula caucasica (Berg, 1898)
- Barbatula cobdonensis (Gundriser 1973) incertae sedis
- Barbatula compressirostris (Warpachowski, 1897)
- Barbatula conilobus Prokofiev, 2016
- Barbatula dgebuadzei (Prokofiev, 2003)
- Barbatula dsapchynensis Prokofiev, 2016
- Barbatula emuensis H. Chen, H. Zhang, Y. Chen & Freyhof, 2019
- Barbatula fluvicola Calegari, Freyhof, Waldock, Wegscheider, Josi, Rüber & Seehausen, 2025
- Barbatula gibba L. Cao, Causse & E. Zhang, 2012
- Barbatula golubtsovi (Prokofiev, 2003)
- Barbatula hispanica (Lelek, 1987)
- Barbatula karabanowi Prokofiev, 2018
- Barbatula kirinensis T.-L. Tchang, 1932
- Barbatula leoparda Gauliard, Dettai, Persat, Keith & Denys, 2019
- Barbatula liaoyangensis Chen, Zhang, Chen & Freyhof, 2019
- Barbatula linjiangensis Chen, Zhang, Chen & Freyhof, 2019
- Barbatula markakulensis (Men'shikov, 1939)
- Barbatula nuda (Bleeker, 1864)
- Barbatula ommata Calegari, Freyhof, Waldock, Wegscheider, Josi, Rüber & Seehausen, 2025
- Barbatula oreas (D. S. Jordan & Fowler, 1903)
- Barbatula pechiliensis (Fowler, 1899)
- Barbatula potaninorum (Prokofiev, 2007)
- Barbatula restricta Prokofiev, 2015
- Barbatula sawadai (Prokofiev, 2007)
- Barbatula selengensis Prokofiev, 2024
- Barbatula sturanyi (Steindachner, 1892)
- Barbatula taurica (Kessler, 1877)
- Barbatula tomiana (Ruzsky (ru), 1920)
- Barbatula toni (Dybowski, 1869)
- Barbatula vardarensis (Karaman, 1928)
- Barbatula zetensis (Šorić, 2000)
- Barbatula zhangwuensis Chen, Zhang, Chen & Freyhof 2019

Synonyms

- Barbatula quignardi (Băcescu-Meşter, 1967); valid as B. barbatula
