= Krähenbach =

Krähenbach may refer to:

- Krähenbach (Danube), a river of Baden-Württemberg, Germany, tributary of the Danube
- Krähenbach (Kammel), a river of Bavaria, Germany, tributary of the Kammel
