= Aborichthys garoensis =

Conservation status
- Vulnerable (IUCN 3.1)

Scientific classification
- Kingdom: Animalia
- Phylum: Chordata
- Class: Actinopterygii
- Order: Cypriniformes
- Family: Nemacheilidae
- Genus: Aborichthys
- Species: A. garoensis

Binomial name
- Aborichthys garoensis Hora, 1925

Species of fish

Aborichthys garoensis is a species of stone loach found in the Garo Hills of Meghalaya, India. This fish grows to a length of 9.0 centimetres (3.5 in) SL.
