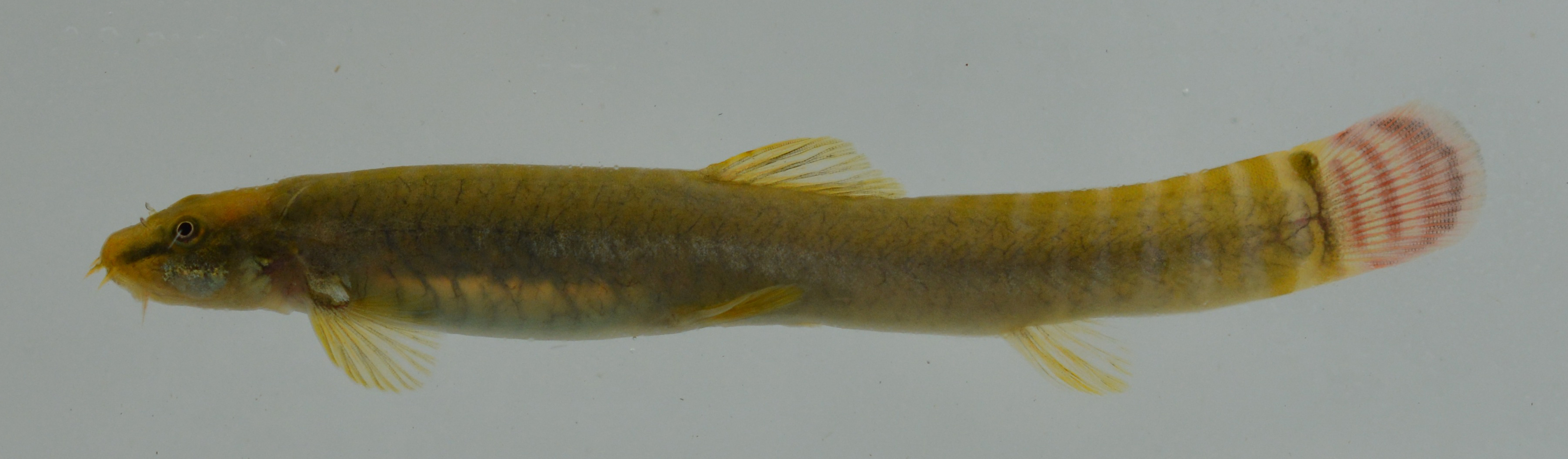
- Aborichthys elongatus

Scientific classification
- Kingdom: Animalia
- Phylum: Chordata
- Class: Actinopterygii
- Division: Teleostei
- Order: Cypriniformes
- Family: Nemacheilidae
- Genus: Aborichthys; B. L. Chaudhuri, 1913

Type species
- Aborichthys kempi Chaudhuri, 1913

= Aborichthys =

Genus of fishes

Aborichthys is a genus of stone loaches. It can be found in freshwater streams of India, though one species also found in Myanmar.

== Species ==
There are at least 15 recognized species in this genus:

- Aborichthys bajpaii (P. Singh & Kosygin, 2022)
- Aborichthys barapensis Nanda & Tamang, 2021
- Aborichthys boutanensis (McClelland, 1842)
- Aborichthys cataracta Arunachalam, Raja, Malaiammal & Mayden, 2014
- Aborichthys elongatus Hora, 1921
- Aborichthys garoensis Hora, 1925
- Aborichthys iphipaniensis Kosygin, Gurumayum, P. Singh & Chowdhury, 2019
- Aborichthys kailashi Shangningam, Kosygin, Sinha & Gurumayum, 2019
- Aborichthys kempi Chaudhuri, 1913
- Aborichthys palinensis Nanda & Tamang, 2021
- Aborichthys pangensis Shangningam, Kosygin, Sinha & Gurumayum, 2019
- Aborichthys tikaderi Barman, 1985
- Aborichthys uniobarensis Prasanta Nanda, Krima Queen Machahary, Tamang & D. N. Das, 2021
- Aborichthys verticauda Arunachalam, Raja, Malaiammal & Mayden, 2014
- Aborichthys waikhomi Kosygin, 2012
