= Stirner (surname) =

Stirner is a German cognominal surname, originating from German Stirn 'forehead'. Notable people with the surname include:

- Max Stirner, pseudonym of Johann Caspar Schmidt (1806–1856), German philosopher and journalist
- Karl Stirner (1923–2016), American sculptor
- Karl Stirner (painter) (1882–1943), German painter, watercolorist, illustrator and writer
