= Aborichthys waikhomi =

Scientific classification
- Kingdom: Animalia
- Phylum: Chordata
- Class: Actinopterygii
- Order: Cypriniformes
- Family: Nemacheilidae
- Genus: Aborichthys
- Species: A. waikhomi

Binomial name
- Aborichthys waikhomi Kosygin, 2012

Species of fish

Aborichthys waikhomi is a species of stone loach found in the Noa-Dihing River, upper Brahmaputra basin in the Namdapha National Park and Tiger Reserve in Arunachal Pradesh, India. This fish grows to a length of 6.8 centimetres (2.7 in) SL.

The fish is named in honor of ichthyologist Waikhom Vishwanath (b. 1954) of Manipur University, in thanks for his encouragement of the author’s work on this species.
