= Aborichthys verticauda =

Scientific classification
- Domain: Eukaryota
- Kingdom: Animalia
- Phylum: Chordata
- Class: Actinopterygii
- Order: Cypriniformes
- Family: Nemacheilidae
- Genus: Aborichthys
- Species: A. verticauda

Binomial name
- Aborichthys verticauda Arunachalam, Raja, Malaiammal & Mayden, 2014

Species of fish

Aborichthys verticauda is a species of stone loach found in a stream joining the Ranga River in the Lower Subanshri district in India. This fish grows to a length of 7.8 centimetres (3.1 in) SL.
