= Speleonaut =

Diver propulsion vehicle designed for cave exploration by a disabled diver

History

Germany
- Name: Speleonaut
- Builder: Konrad Gehringer
- Launched: 1996
- Status: Active

General characteristics
- Class & type: Research submarine
- Beam: 0.72 metres (2 ft 4 in)
- Propulsion: 9 engines
- Test depth: 105 metres (344 ft)
- Complement: 1 pilot

Speleonaut (named from the Greek words for "cave" and "sailor") is the submersible used by the cave diver Jochen Hasenmayer. After the 1989 decompression accident that left his legs paralyzed, Hasenmayer designed the Speleonaut with his friend Konrad Gehringer in order to continue exploring the Blauhöhle cave system, which begins at the base of the Blautopf spring in the Swabian Jura mountain range. The Speleonaut is 72 centimetres (28 in) wide and has nine engines, making it easy to maneuver in all directions. It is the first submarine designed specifically for the exploration of caves. According to Hasenmayer, the Speleonaut has been tested in Lake Constance to a depth of 105 metres (344 ft) and has a design limit of 180 metres (590 ft).

The Speleonaut was first used at the Blautopf in 1996. In 2001 Hasenmayer reached the Mörikedom ("Mörike cathedral") chamber of the Blauhöhle, which he had discovered in 1985, in the Speleonaut. In 2004 he reached a point beyond the Mörikedom 1,800 metres (5,900 ft) into the mountain. In the same year he discovered two more large chambers in the Blauhöhle: the Mittelschiff (or "nave") and the Äonendom.
