= Aborichthys iphipaniensis =

Scientific classification
- Kingdom: Animalia
- Phylum: Chordata
- Class: Actinopterygii
- Order: Cypriniformes
- Family: Nemacheilidae
- Genus: Aborichthys
- Species: A. iphipaniensis

Binomial name
- Aborichthys iphipaniensis Kosygin, Gurumayum, P. Singh & Chowdhury, 2019

Species of fish

Aborichthys iphipaniensis is a species of freshwater fish in the stone loach family. This species can be found in the Iphipani River drainage, of the upper Brahmaputra river basin, in Arunachal Pradesh, India.
