= Aborichthys tikaderi =

Conservation status
- Vulnerable (IUCN 3.1)

Scientific classification
- Kingdom: Animalia
- Phylum: Chordata
- Class: Actinopterygii
- Order: Cypriniformes
- Family: Nemacheilidae
- Genus: Aborichthys
- Species: A. tikaderi

Binomial name
- Aborichthys tikaderi Barman, 1985

Species of fish

Aborichthys tikaderi is a species of stone loach endemic to Arunachal Pradesh, India where it is only known from streams in the Namdapha Wildlife Sanctuary. This fish grows to a length of 10.5 centimetres (4.1 in) SL. The validity of this taxon is in doubt as it is similar to other species of the genus Aborichthys and more research is needed. If it is a valid species then it may be threatened by deforestation and the building of dams.
