= Barbatula dgebuadzei =

Scientific classification
- Kingdom: Animalia
- Phylum: Chordata
- Class: Actinopterygii
- Order: Cypriniformes
- Family: Nemacheilidae
- Genus: Barbatula
- Species: B. dgebuadzei

Binomial name
- Barbatula dgebuadzei (Prokofiev, 2003)

Synonyms
- Orthrias dgebuadzei Prokofiev, 2003

Species of fish

Barbatula dgebuadzei is a species of ray-finned fish in the genus Barbatula, which belongs to the family Nemacheilidae, the stone loaches. This loach is endemic to Mongolia where it occurs in the Baidrag-Gol River drainage, Gobi Lakes Valley.

== Footnotes ==
- Froese, Rainer; Pauly, Daniel (eds.). "Barbatula dgebuadzei". FishBase.
