= Aborichthys bajpaii =

Scientific classification
- Kingdom: Animalia
- Phylum: Chordata
- Class: Actinopterygii
- Order: Cypriniformes
- Family: Nemacheilidae
- Genus: Aborichthys
- Species: A. bajpaii

Binomial name
- Aborichthys bajpaii P. Singh & Kosygin, 2022

Species of freshwater fish

Aborichthys bajpaii is a species of small, benthic fish, observed in the Siang River, and in the Brahmaputra River drainage, of Arunachal Pradesh, India.

== Description ==
A. bajpaii has a vent and anus that is closer to the caudal fin base than to the snout, and 17–22 stripes that converge to the mid-dorsal line which are branched into 26–38 bars along the flank. The vertical bars on the caudal peduncle, an incomplete lateral line that continues to the end of the pectoral fin, a long head (20.2-21.5% SL) and a deep body (12.2-15.3% SL) all help to distinguish this species from other members of its genus. A. bajpaii's pectoral fin has 91/2 branched rays, its dorsal fin origin is equidistant to the snout and to the base of caudal fin, its pelvic fin origin is closer to the pectoral fin origin than to the anal fin origin, there are 2–3 irregular black stripes on the dorsal fin, it's a maxillary barbel extends over the posterior edge of the orbit, and its caudal fin is truncate with 2–4 irregular black stripes.
