= Aborichthys boutanensis =

Scientific classification
- Kingdom: Animalia
- Phylum: Chordata
- Class: Actinopterygii
- Order: Cypriniformes
- Family: Nemacheilidae
- Genus: Aborichthys
- Species: A. boutanensis

Binomial name
- Aborichthys boutanensis (McClelland, 1842)

Synonyms
- Cobitis boutanensis McClelland, 1842; Paracobitis boutanensis (McClelland, 1842)

Species of loach

Aborichthys boutanensis is a species of stone loach native to the Helmand river basin in Afghanistan. This species reaches a length of 5 cm (2.0 in).
