= Barbatula altayensis =

Conservation status
- Least Concern (IUCN 3.1)

Scientific classification
- Kingdom: Animalia
- Phylum: Chordata
- Class: Actinopterygii
- Order: Cypriniformes
- Family: Nemacheilidae
- Genus: Barbatula
- Species: B. altayensis

Binomial name
- Barbatula altayensis S. Q. Zhu, 1992

Species of fish

Barbatula altayensis is one of seventeen species of ray-finned fish in the genus Barbatula. It is found in Mongolia and Xinjiang Province in China.
