= Blauhöhle =

Flooded cave system in Southern Germany

Coordinates: 48°24′59″N 9°47′02″E

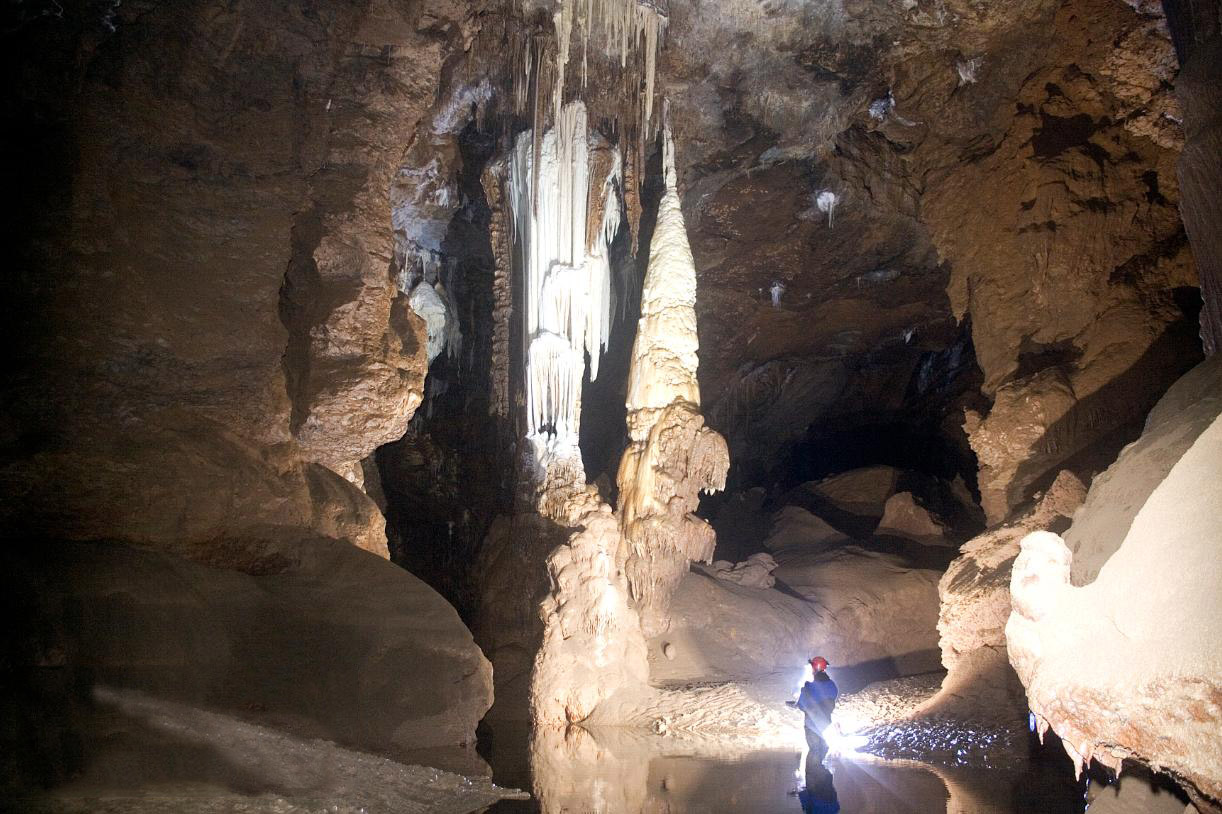
- Interactive map of Blauhöhle
- Location: Blautopf
- Depth: 42 metres (138 ft)
- Length: 13,100 metres (43,000 ft)
- Discovery: 1980
- Geology: Limestone
- Entrances: 2
- Hazards: Extended cave dive with current
- Translation: Blue cave (German)

The Blauhöhle is the largest known cave system in the Swabian Alps in southern Germany. The Blauhöhle presumably originated in a time when the Danube still flowed through the Blau valley. Since the shifting of the Danube, several small rivers, the Schmiech, the Ach, and the Blau, have flowed through this valley. The cave system begins about 21 meters under water at the base of the Blautopf. It continues west and northwest, rising and falling several times until after a horizontal distance of about 1,200 metres (3,900 ft) it comes above the level of ground water and opens into the second big air-filled chamber. The maximum depth of the cave under water is 42 metres (138 ft).

This chamber was first discovered in 1985 by Jochen Hasenmayer, who named it Mörikedom (Mörike Cathedral, named after Eduard Mörike). Hasenmayer's diving accident in the Wolfgangsee resulted in a long break in its exploration. For several years the cave has been explored by the Arbeitsgemeinschaft Blautopf (Blautopf Study Group, or Consortium), a team of cave divers from several different regional groups. This group has made progress exploring the cave, including making exact measurements of the way to the Mörikedom. The improvement of underwater breathing technology, especially the rebreather, has allowed for longer dives carrying less weight. The discovery of the Wolkenschloss (Castle of Clouds), another large, air-filled cavern, and the so-called Landweg (land-way), a long, open cave river behind the Mörikedom, were great successes for the Arbeitsgemeinschaft.

Hasenmayer continued his attempts to explore the cave system in his cave submersible, Speleonaut.

Since 2002 the Arbeitsgemeinschaft Höhle und Karst Grabenstetten (Cave and Karst Consortium of Grabenstetten), as a part of their work on a neighboring cave system, the Vetterhöhle, have attempted to dig a dry entrance into the Blauhöhle. In 2006 several large caverns were discovered in the Vetterhöhle, and in the autumn a connection was discovered between the Vetterhöhle and the Wolkenschloss.

Also in the autumn of 2006, the Arbeitsgemeinschaft Blautopf discovered a chamber at the end of the Landweg, measuring 170 m (560 ft) long by 50 m (160 ft) wide by 50 m high, which was named Apokalypse. The groups are now also working with yet another Arbeitsgemeinschaft on a sinkhole north of Blaubeuren, which is believed to be connected with the Blauhöhle beyond the Apokalypse.
