= Schönbach (river) =

River in Germany

Location
- Country: Germany
- State: Baden-Württemberg

Physical characteristics
- Mouth
  - location: Elta
  - coordinates: 48.0156°N 8.7261°E
- Length: 10.2 km (6.3 mi)

Basin features
- Progression: Elta→ Danube→ Black Sea

Schönbach is a river of Baden-Württemberg, Germany. It is a right tributary of the Elta in Seitingen-Oberflacht.

== See also ==
- List of rivers of Baden-Württemberg
