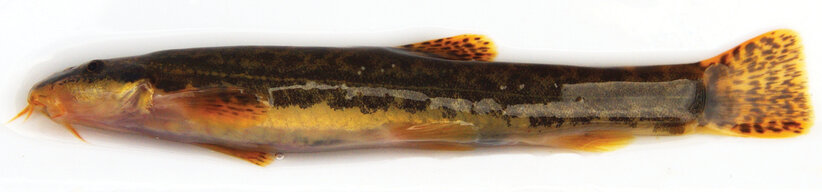

Conservation status
- Least Concern (IUCN 3.1)

Scientific classification
- Kingdom: Animalia
- Phylum: Chordata
- Class: Actinopterygii
- Order: Cypriniformes
- Family: Nemacheilidae
- Genus: Barbatula
- Species: B. toni

Binomial name
- Barbatula toni (Dybowski, 1869)

Synonyms
- Cobitis toni Dybowski, 1869; Noemacheilus toni (Dybowski, 1869); Barbatula compressirostris Warpachowsky, 1897; Nemacheilus sibiricus Gratzianov, 1907

= Barbatula toni =

Species of fish

Barbatula toni is a species of ray-finned fish in the genus Barbatula.

A freshwater fish, it is found in rivers in Russia, Mongolia, China and Japan that flow into the northwestern Pacific.
