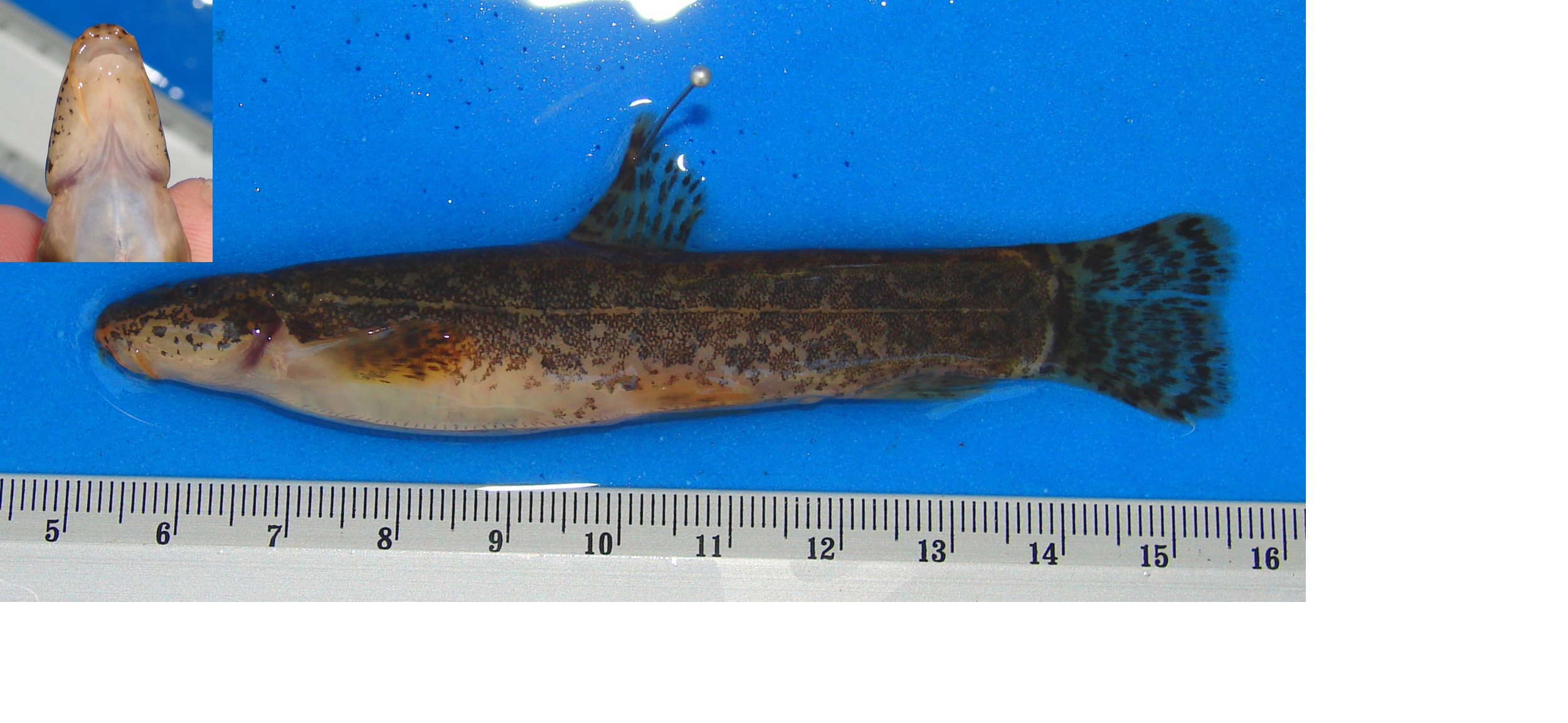
- Languedoc stone loach

Conservation status
- Critically Endangered (IUCN 3.1)

Scientific classification
- Kingdom: Animalia
- Phylum: Chordata
- Class: Actinopterygii
- Order: Cypriniformes
- Family: Nemacheilidae
- Genus: Barbatula
- Species: B. quignardi

Binomial name
- Barbatula quignardi (Băcescu-Mester, 1967)
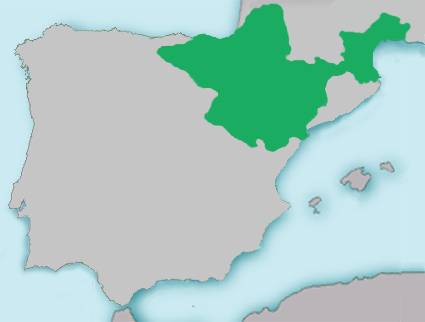

Synonyms
- Nemacheilus barbatulus quignardi Băcescu-Meşter, 1967

= Barbatula quignardi =

Species of fish

Barbatula quignardi, the Languedoc stone loach or Les stone loach,, is a species of ray-finned fish in the genus Barbatula, which belongs to the family Nemacheilidae, the stone loaches.

== Habitat ==
This loach is found in the drainage of Ebro, Bidasoa and Nervión in Spain and Lez, Tech, Adour and Garonne drainages in France.

Populations of B. quignardi in the Iberian Peninsula have been negatively impacted by various invasive species, including the aggressive signal crayfish (Pacifastacus leniusculus).

== Size ==
This species reaches a length of 7.0 cm (2.8 in).

== Etymology ==
The species honors ichthyologist Jean‑Pierre Quignard (b. 1934), then of the Marine Station at Sète and later Montpellier University, whose courtesy allowed the author to secure the type specimens.
