= Krähenbach (Danube) =

River in Baden-Württemberg, Germany

Location
- Country: Germany
- State: Baden-Württemberg
- District: Tuttlingen

Physical characteristics
- Source
  - location: About 200 m (660 ft) east of the clay pit in the Haldenwald forest in Tuningen
  - coordinates: 48°1′11″N 8°37′16″E
  - elevation: 806 m (2,644 ft)
- Mouth
  - location: Confluence with Danube at Tuttlingen-Möhringen
  - coordinates: 47°57′21″N 8°46′8″E
  - elevation: 644 m (2,113 ft)
- Length: 16.5 km (10.3 mi)
- Basin size: 33.2 km^{2} (12.8 sq mi)

Basin features
- Progression: Danube→ Black Sea
- Tributaries
  - left: Greutgraben
  - right: Zimmerthälebach, Lachengraben, Röhrenbrunnenbach, Schlösslegraben, Tiefentalbach, Kühltalbach

The Krähenbach is a tributary of the Danube on the Baar plateau in Tuttlingen in the Upper Danube Nature Park, Baden-Württemberg, Germany.

== Course ==
The Krähenbach rises some 200 m east of the clay pit in the Haldenwald forest in the municipality of Tuningen, next to a forest road at about 806 m above sea level (NN). From there it flows northeast through the Haldenwald forest past a Celtic square earthwork, underneath the Bundesstraße B 523 and then across the fen into the municipality of Talheim. Here is reaches its northernmost point, a sharp turn to the southeast. Next to the K5919, it leaves its narrow valley and takes up the Zimmerthälebach from the right, and, less than 200m further, the Krähenbach the Greutgraben form the left. It then flows past two small lakes, the second of which is used as a swimming pool. If then takes up the Lachengraben from the right and flows through the village of Talheim. It then takes up the Röhrenbrunnenbach from the right, then turns to the east.

At the Upper Mill outside the village of Weichbild, the direction changes back to southeast. Here, the stream is accompanied by the K5944 and the B 523 on the right bank. It flows through a valley with wooded slopes, past the Götzenloch court on the left and the Lower Mill on the right, below the ruins of Klingenberg Castle. Past mount Reisenberg, the B 523 changes to the left bank. The Krähenbach then flows past mount Sommerbergs and takes up some minor tributaries on both sides, before flowing into the village Eßlingen in the municipality of Tuttlingen, which is the seat of the eponymous Landkreis. Some of the water is diverted into a several kilometers long mill stream, which rejoins the Krähenbach before Eßlingen Mill, right below a pass across which the B 523 continues into the adjacent Elta valley. At this point, the distance between the Krähenbach and the Elta is slightly more than 600 meters.

The Tiefentalbach flows down from mount Möhringer Berg through a wooded valley and joins the Krähenbach from the right, opposite Eßlingen Mill, which is situated below the ruins of Konzenberg Castle. Further downstream, a reservoir fills almost the entire width of the valley. The Krähenbach flows to the right of this reservoir and on through the Bächetal valley. After a recent nature restoration project, the Krähenbach is once again able to meander through this valley. It then reaches the northern edge of the village of Möhringen an der Donau. This village is now part of Tuttlingen and lies in the floodplain on the left side of the Danube. Inside Möhringen, the Krähenbach takes up a stream coming down from the Kühltal valley on the right.

In summer, when all of the water of the upper Danube disappears into the Danube Sinkhole, the Krähenbach is the first river to provide water to the dry Danube bed.

== Tributaries ==
- Zimmerthälebach, from right at 747.6 m above NN
- Greutgraben, from left shortly after the previous, 0.8 km
- Two lakes on the right of the stream of about 0.4 and 0.2 ha
- Lachengraben, from right to 743.3 m above NN, opposite the sports field in Talheim, 0.9 km
- Röhrenbrunnenbach, from the right in Talheim, 2.2 km
- Schlösslegraben, from the right, from the direction of the former Klingenberg Castle, 0.8 km
- Mühlengraben, right in just before mill Eßlingen Mill, 1.1 km
- Tiefentalbach from the Eslinger Tiefental valley, right across from the Eßlingen Mill, 1.6 km
- stream from the Kühltal, from the right in Möhringen an der Donau, 1.5 km

== Catchment area ==
The catchment area of the Krähenbach measures 33.2 km². It borders on the left side to the north and northwest to that of the Elta, on the south by that of the Weißenbach, on the west briefly to that of Amtenhauser Bach, in the north-west of the Kötach, all of which also flow to the southeast to the upper Danube.

== See also ==
- List of rivers of Baden-Württemberg

== References and sources ==
- "TK50": 1:50,000 Topographic map of Baden-Württemberg
