= Barbatula potaninorum =

Scientific classification
- Kingdom: Animalia
- Phylum: Chordata
- Class: Actinopterygii
- Order: Cypriniformes
- Family: Nemacheilidae
- Genus: Barbatula
- Species: B. potaninorum

Binomial name
- Barbatula potaninorum (Prokofiev, 2007)

Synonyms
- Orthrias potaninorum Prokofiev, 2007

Species of fish

Barbatula potaninorum is a species of ray-finned fish in the genus Barbatula, which belongs to the family Nemacheilidae, the stone loaches. This loach is found in northern China and Inner Mongolia.
