= Danube Sinkhole =

Hydrologic feature in the Danube and Rhine watersheds

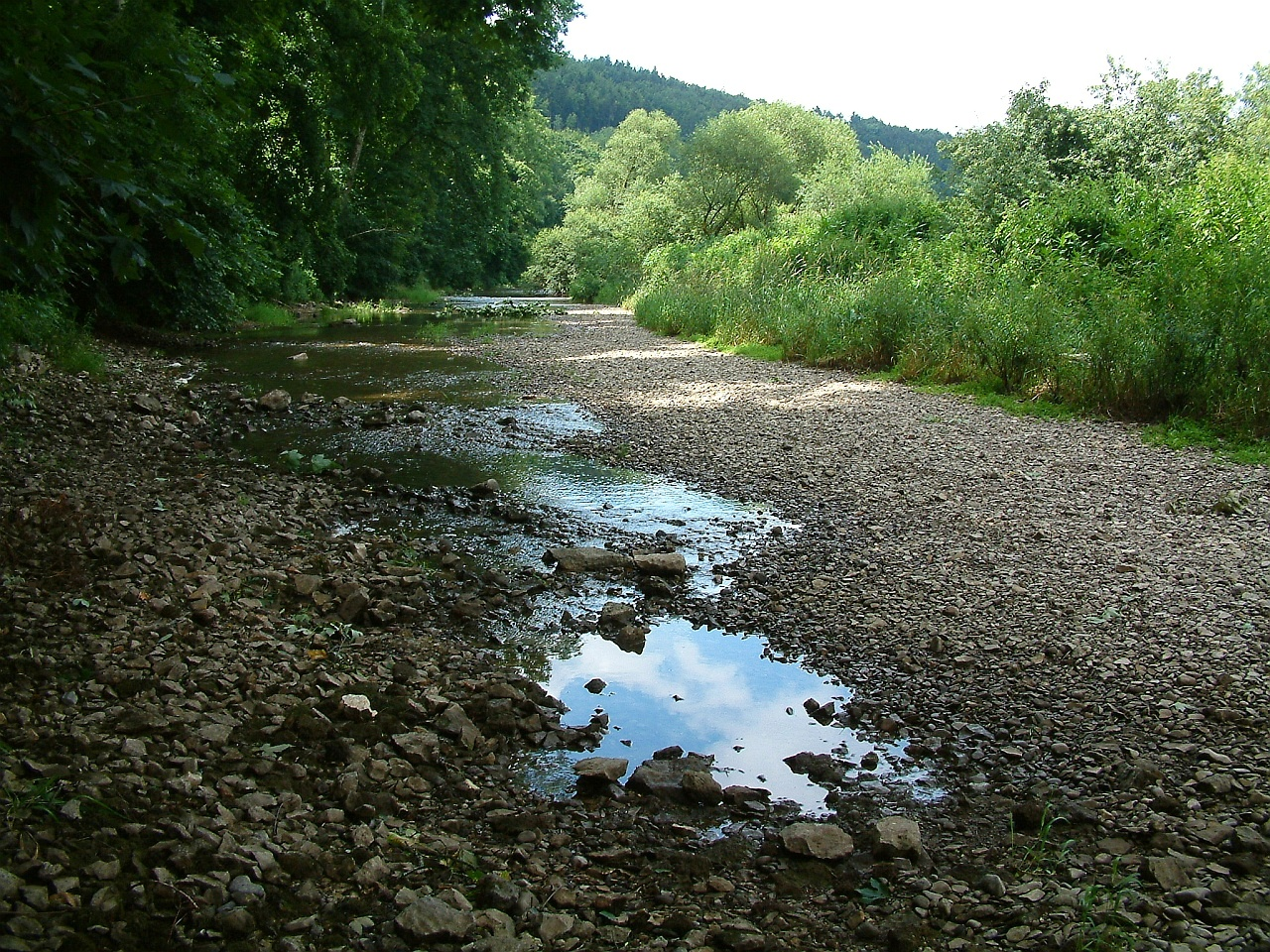
Sinkhole in the Danube near Möhringen

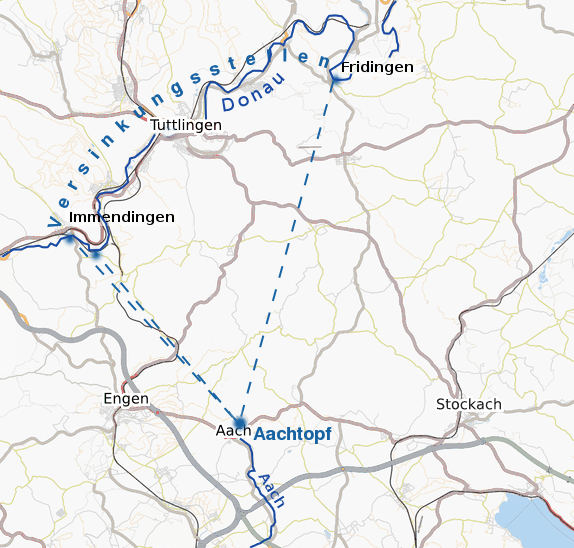
Schematic of the sinkhole locations and the route to Aachtopf

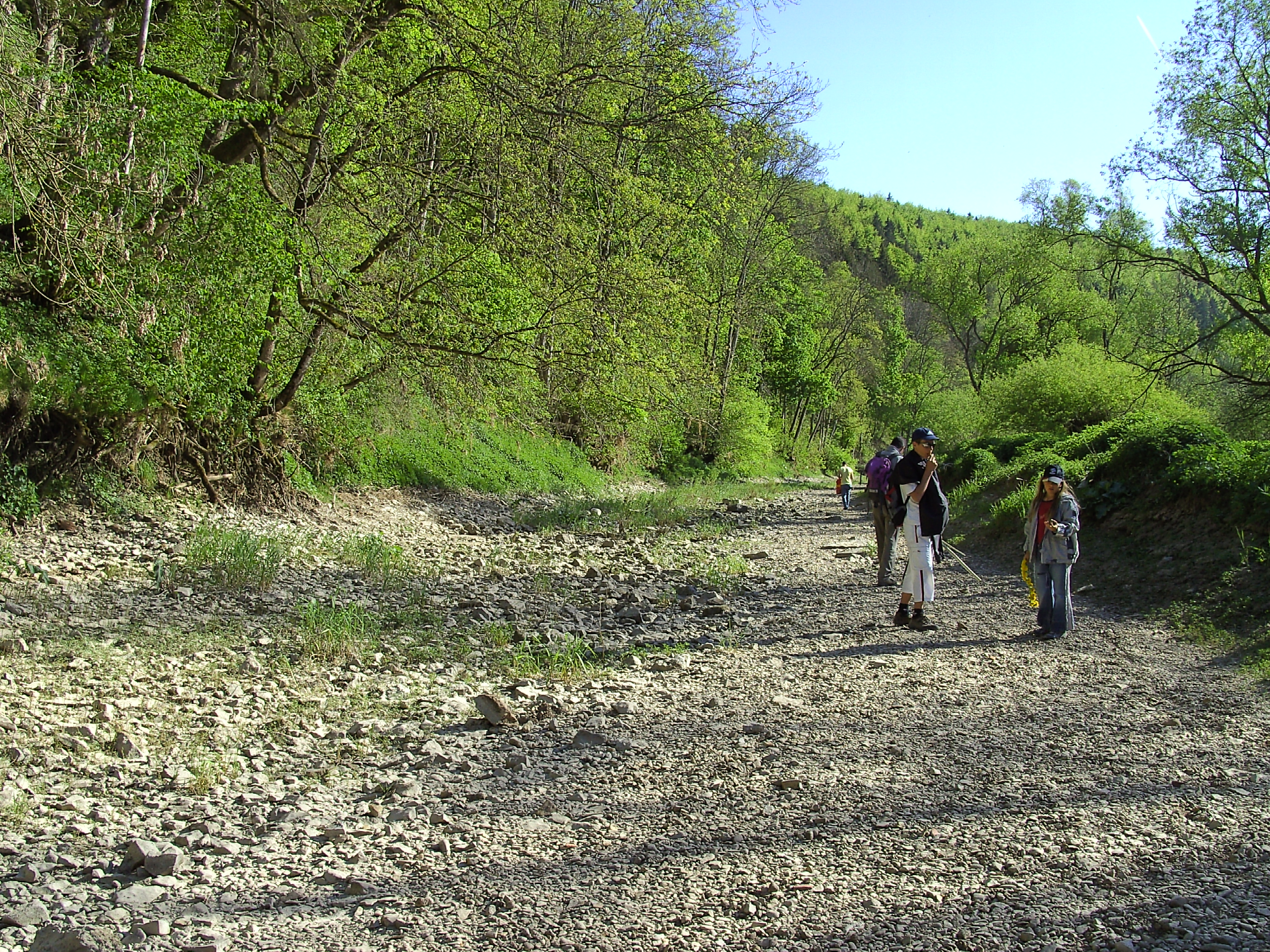
Completely dry Danube riverbed

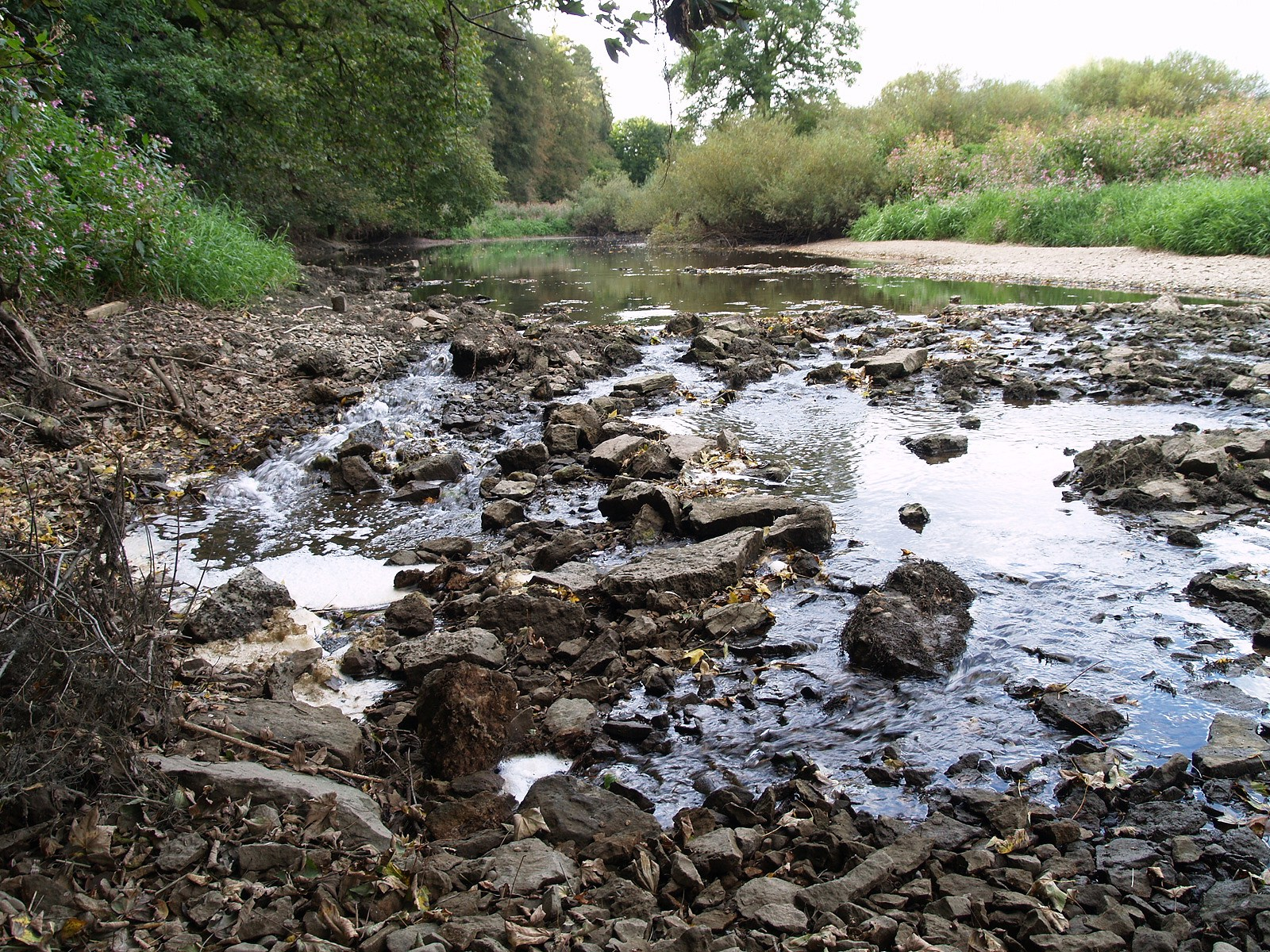
Sink hole on the southern bank of the Danube, at the main sinkhole site below Immendingen

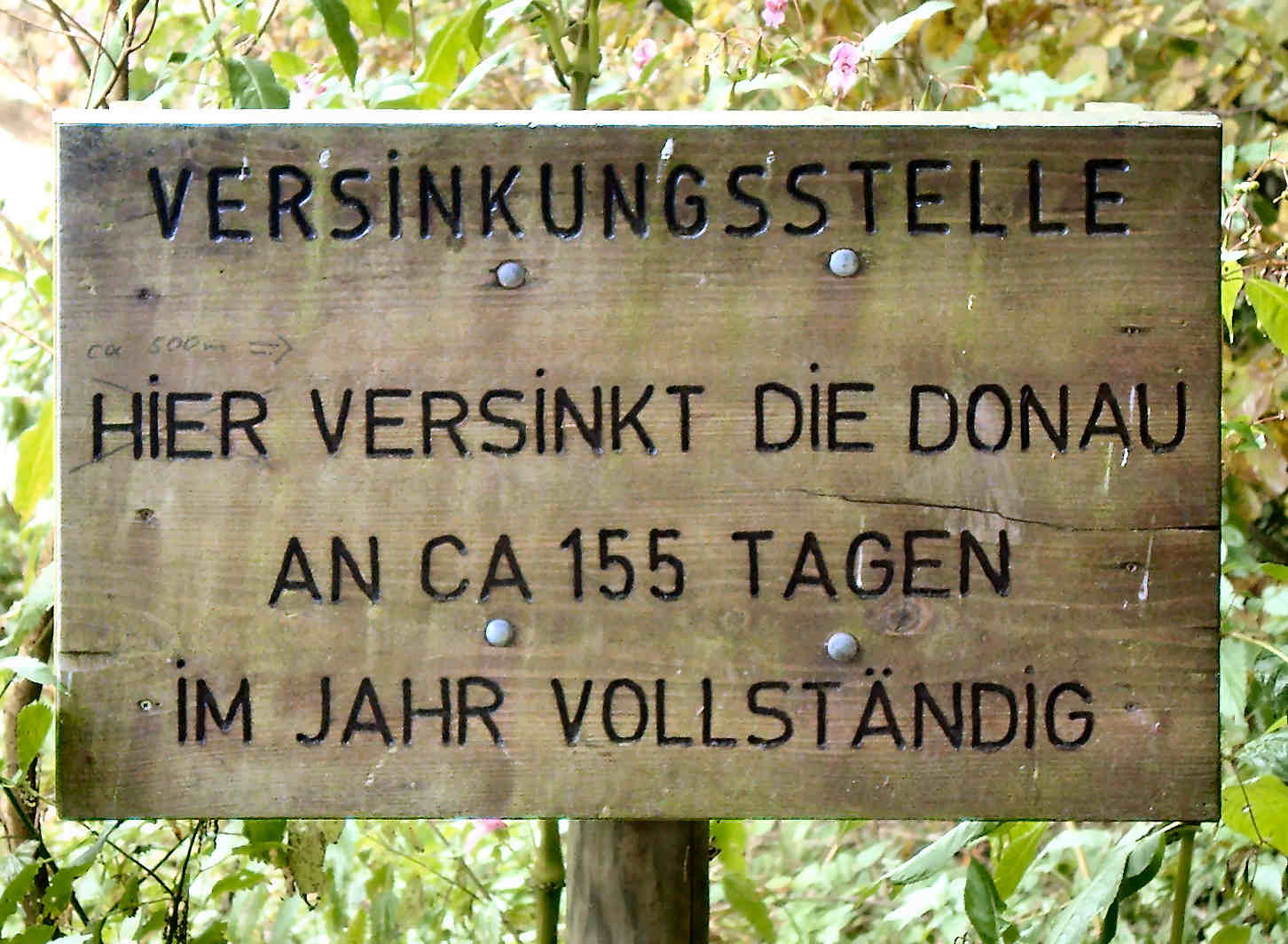
Sign in Immendingen. Translation: "Sinkhole – Here the Danube sinks dry on about 155 days per year"

The Danube Sinkhole (German: Donauversinkung or Donauversickerung) is an incipient underground stream capture in the Upper Danube Nature Park. Between Immendingen and Möhringen and also near Fridingen (Tuttlingen), the water of the Danube sinks into the riverbed in various places. The main sinkhole is next to a field named Brühl between Immendingen and Möhringen.

The term "sinking" is more accurate than "seeping", because, instead of just distributing into the soil, the Danube's water flows through caverns to the Aachtopf, where it emerges as the river Radolfzeller Aach, a tributary of Lake Constance and the Rhine, respectively.

== Hydrography ==
The sinking Danube water disappears into a karst water system of the well-stratified limestone formation, the ox2 layer, of the White Jura and appears again in a horizontal limestone layer, the ki4 layer, approximately twelve kilometers away at Aachtopf. It then flows as Radolfzeller Aach into Lower Lake Constance (Untersee) west of Radolfzell. Thus, a part of the Danube water also flows into the Rhine. This geographical situation is a striking feature of the large European Watershed, which separates the catchment areas of the North Sea and the Black Sea.

The water flows out through a variety of small to very small cracks and crevices; the karst in these places is apparently at an early stage of development. The cave system of Aachtopf, which is the underground river Danube is, however, probably already well developed; This can be inferred from the tight correlation in water temperatures of the Danube and the Aachtopf spring, which matches the behaviour of an underground river better than that of a branching system.

== History ==
The first documented case of the Danube completely disappearing into the hole dates back to 1874. Since then, the number of days per year when this happens has risen sharply. Between 1884 and 1904, it happened, on average, 80 days per year. In 1922, it happened only on 29 days. In 1923, however, the number increased to 148. Between 1933 and 1937, the average was on 209; from 1938 to 1945, it was 270 days. The highest number so far, was in 1921, with 309 days.

The relationship between the sinkhole and Aachtopf spring was proven in October 1877. Geologist Adolf Knop of the Karlsruhe Institute of Technology poured 10 kg of sodium fluorescein, 20 tons of salt, and 1200 kg of shale oil into the Danube on 9 October. After 60 hours, all three substances emerged at the Aachtopf. The water at Aachtopf was described as "gorgeously green lit" by the fluorescein and tasting of creosote.

Later, the connection of the individual sinkholes was explored. In 1908 an experiment of drowning water in Fridingen in the presence of Baden and Württemberg Government representatives confirmed the assumption of Professor Endrist -Stuttgart that the Fridingen sinkhole not only leads to the Aach, but that large amounts of it could also be artificially induced. A German newspaper in the US reported about the event. In about 1908, a shaft was dug in Fridingen in an attempt to find out where the water of this sinkhole disappears to.

In 1927, a case was brought before the Supreme Court of the German Reich between Württemberg and Prussia as the ruler of the Hohenzollern Province on the one hand, and the state of Baden on the other hand, to decide the smoldering controversy over the quantitative impact of the Danube sinkhole, which is known as the Danube Sinkhole case (German: Donauversinkungsfall). The Court rendered an interim decision and left the final settlement to an agreement between the parties. In January 1937, the "Donau-Aach-Gesetz" gave the Reich Minister for Agriculture the authority to decide on necessary measures and who was to pay the costs. After WWII, in 1967, a canal was built between Immendingen and Möhringen, which brings water to Tuttlingen during times of low water levels.

== Outlook ==
As the karst is developing, future sinkhole stretches cannot be accurately predicted. The underground river Danube annually removes about 7,000 tons of lime, that is 2,700 m^{3} in volume, from the karst system. Future expansions or collapses in the underground system are conceivable, which would show above ground as sinkholes or ponors.

In the long run, today's upper Danube will probably be redirected entirely into the Radolfzeller Aach, and thus to the Rhine. This would mean that other tributaries that are currently insignificant would become the new headwaters of the Danube. The Danube has experienced a similar stream capture further upstream, during the Würm glaciation, when the Feldberg-Danube was captured by the Wutach at the Wutach Gorge near Blumberg.

== Coordinates ==
The water of the Danube is captured at the sinkholes in Immendingen (47°55′45.78″N 8°45′26.07″E) and Fridingen (48°0′38.98″N 8°55′3.41″E) and emerges at Aachtopf (47°50′48″N 8°51′29″E). It flows into Lake Constance at Radolfzell (47.732714°N 8.941112°E). The Rhine flows out of Lake Constance (47.658797°N 8.858414°E) and towards Basel, where it turns north (47.561006°N 7.589321°E).

When the Rhine captures the headwaters of the Danube through the karst, the new headwaters of the Danube will be the Krähenbach where it currently meets the Danube ( 47°57′21″N 8°46′8″E) and the Elta where it currently meets the Danube (47.984866°N 8.801379°E).
