= Barbatula sturanyi =

Conservation status
- Near Threatened (IUCN 3.1)

Scientific classification
- Kingdom: Animalia
- Phylum: Chordata
- Class: Actinopterygii
- Order: Cypriniformes
- Family: Nemacheilidae
- Genus: Barbatula
- Species: B. sturanyi

Binomial name
- Barbatula sturanyi (Steindachner, 1892)

Synonyms
- Nemacheilus sturanyi Steindachner, 1892

Species of fish

Barbatula sturanyi, the Ohrid stone loach, is a species of ray-finned fish in the genus Barbatula, which belongs to the family Nemacheilidae, the stone loaches. This loach is endemic to te Lake Ohrid drainage basin in the Balkan Peninsula.
