= Barbatula sawadai =

Conservation status
- Least Concern (IUCN 3.1)

Scientific classification
- Kingdom: Animalia
- Phylum: Chordata
- Class: Actinopterygii
- Order: Cypriniformes
- Family: Nemacheilidae
- Genus: Barbatula
- Species: B. sawadai

Binomial name
- Barbatula sawadai (Prokofiev, 2007)

Synonyms
- Orthrias sawadai Prokofiev, 2007

Species of fish

Barbatula sawadai is a species of stone loach in the family Nemacheilidae. It is native to the Selenga River basin in Mongolia and Russia.

== Size ==
This species reaches a length of 15.0 cm (5.9 in).

== Etymology ==
The fish is named in honor of ichthyologist Yukio Sawada, of Hokkaido University (Japan), who studied the osteology of loaches.
