= Barbatula conilobus =

Scientific classification
- Domain: Eukaryota
- Kingdom: Animalia
- Phylum: Chordata
- Class: Actinopterygii
- Order: Cypriniformes
- Family: Nemacheilidae
- Genus: Barbatula
- Species: B. conilobus

Binomial name
- Barbatula conilobus Prokofiev, 2016

Fish species

Barbatula conilobus is a species of stone loach in the family Nemacheilidae.
