= Barbatula zetensis =

Zeta stone loach

Conservation status
- Endangered (IUCN 3.1)

Scientific classification
- Kingdom: Animalia
- Phylum: Chordata
- Class: Actinopterygii
- Order: Cypriniformes
- Family: Nemacheilidae
- Genus: Barbatula
- Species: B. zetensis

Binomial name
- Barbatula zetensis (Šorić, 2001)

Species of fish

Barbatula zetensis, also known as the Zeta stone loach, is a species of Cypriniformes fish in the genus Barbatula. It is found in the drainage of the River Morača in the Lake Skadar basin in Montenegro. It is common in streams and rivers with stone beds.
