= Barbatula nuda =

Conservation status
- Least Concern (IUCN 3.1)

Scientific classification
- Kingdom: Animalia
- Phylum: Chordata
- Class: Actinopterygii
- Order: Cypriniformes
- Family: Nemacheilidae
- Genus: Barbatula
- Species: B. nuda

Binomial name
- Barbatula nuda (Bleeker, 1864)

Synonyms
- Nemacheilus nudus Bleeker, 1864; Barbatula barbatula nuda (Bleeker, 1864); Orthrias nudus (Bleeker, 1864)

Species of fish

Barbatula nuda is a species of ray-finned fish in the genus Barbatula, which belongs to the family Nemacheilidae, the stone loaches. This loach is found in the Liao and Taizi River drainages in northern China and in northern North Korea.
