= Jochen Hasenmayer =

German cave diver and explorer

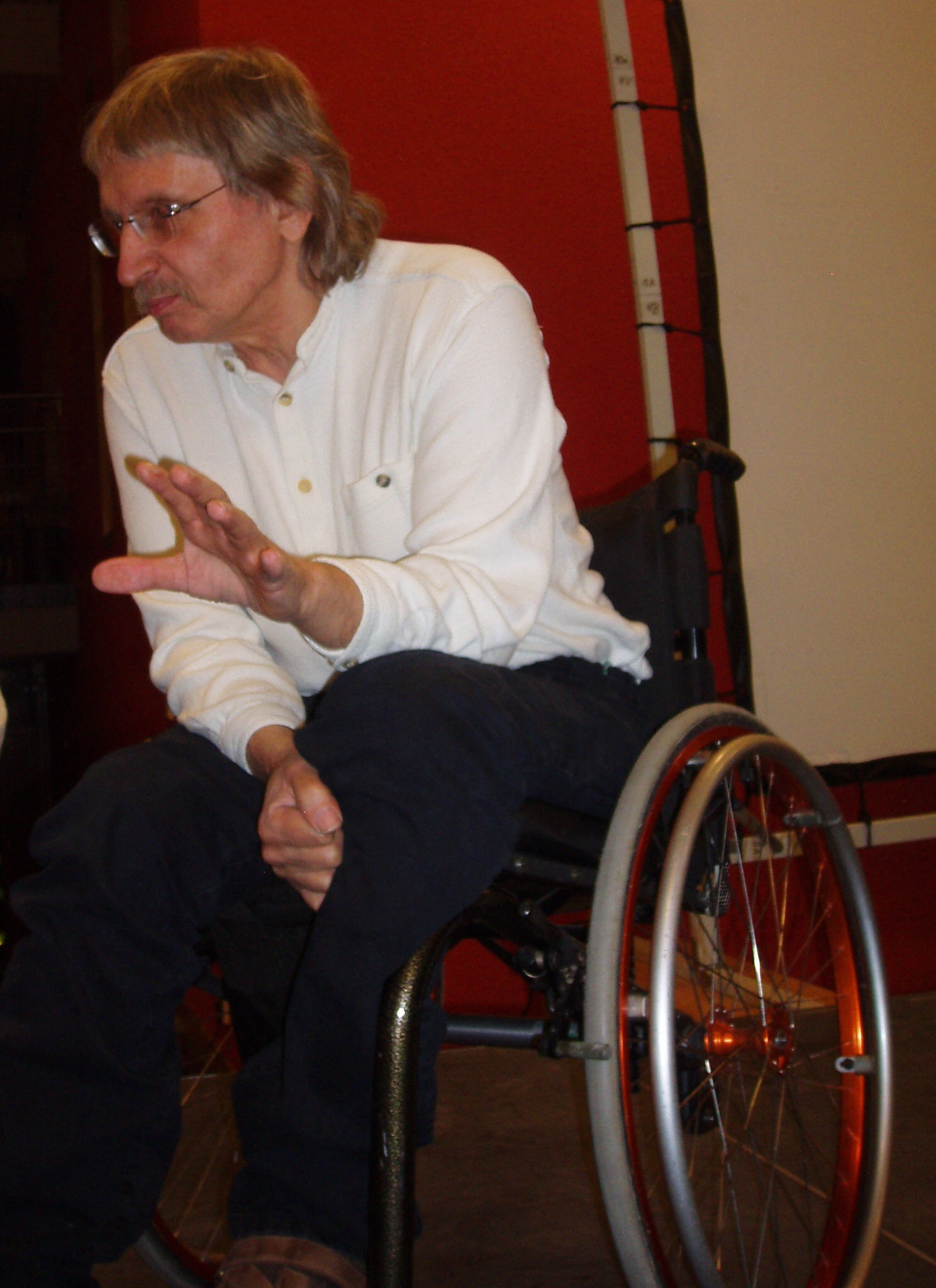
- Jochen Hasenmayer, 2009
- Born: 28 October 1941 (age 85); Pforzheim, Germany
- Occupation: Cave diver

Jochen Hasenmayer (born 28 October 1941 in Pforzheim, Germany) is a German speleologist and cave diver from Birkenfeld in Baden-Württemberg, whose spectacular dives have frequently made headlines.

== Cave diving ==
Hasenmayer began his cave diving career in 1957 at the age of fifteen, exploring the Falkensteiner Höhle near Stuttgart. Beginning in the 1960s, Hasenmayer explored many karst springs and caves in the Swabian Jura and elsewhere in Southern Germany, including the Wimsener Höhle, the Aachtopf and the Blautopf. He became famous in 1985 due to the discovery of the Mörikedom ("Mörike Cathedral", named after the German pastor and poet Eduard Mörike), the second big air-filled chamber in the Blauhöhle, about 1,250 metres (4,100 ft) into the cave system. Some of his terminuses (farthest point reached in a cave) have not been exceeded.

In the late 1970s, Hasenmayer was among the divers who searched for an underwater connection between Kingsdale Master Cave and Keld Head in the Yorkshire Dales. On 5 February 1978 Hasenmayer briefly became trapped in Keld Head. A British diver, Geoff Yeadon, shook Hasenmayer's hand through a gap in the cave, believing he was "shaking a dead man's hand", but Hasenmayer found his way out. The passage where the incident occurred became known as "Dead Man's Handshake".

Hasenmayer spent decades developing the necessary diving equipment for his explorations. Well known as a safety fanatic, Hasenmayer has introduced unique practices perceived by some cave divers as safe, but which contradict the basic rules of normal diving. Hasenmayer was a pioneer in the use of trimix breathing gas mixtures (adding helium to oxygen and nitrogen).

Hasenmayer and American cave diver Sheck Exley became friends and rivals in the 1980s, each repeatedly attempting to break the depth records of the other. In 1981 Hasenmayer used mixed gas to reach a depth of 476 feet (145 m) in the Fountain of Vaucluse in France. Hasenmayer made the world's first 200 metres (660 ft) dive in the Fountain of Vaucluse on 9 September 1982, diving after dark because he had been denied a diving permit. His then-wife, Barbara, waited all night for him to surface. In 1983 Hasenmayer made a mixed-gas cave dive to 656 feet (200 m) at Vaucluse.

Due to a faulty depth gauge, in 1989 Hasenmayer surfaced too quickly after a dive in the Wolfgangsee, a lake in Austria. His short decompression resulted in the bends, causing paralysis, but his colleagues immediately placed him in a waiting decompression chamber, and initially the paralysis was reversed. However, the emergency physicians at the hospital in Graz again decompressed Hasenmayer too quickly. Since that time he has been a paraplegic. Hasenmayer did not give up diving, but since 1996 has used a submersible, the Speleonaut, designed and built by Hasenmayer and his friend Konrad Gehringer, to explore the Blauhöhle.

In 2001 Hasenmayer reached the Mörikedom chamber of the Blauhöhle in the Speleonaut. In 2004 he reached a point beyond the Mörikedom 1,800 metres (5,900 ft) into the mountain. In the same year he discovered two more large chambers in the Blauhöhle: the Mittelschiff (or "nave") and the Äonendom. For the last several years the Blautopf cave system has been explored by the Arbeitsgemeinschaft Blautopf (Blautopf Study Group, or Consortium), a team of cave divers led by Hasenmayer. The most recent fatal accident in the Blautopf occurred in 2003, killing Bernd Aspacher, a member of Hasenmayer's team.

Hasenmayer developed a controversial theory on the subject of karst formation in Southern Germany. According to this theory, the Blauhöhle was formed between 25 million and 100 million years ago, much earlier than is currently believed. Therefore, the Blauhöhle could not drain to the original Danube Valley, today the Blau, and must have drained much farther south. Since these caves are deep enough to contain large quantities of thermal water, this could lead to the recovery of geothermal energy which could be used to solve energy problems in Southern Germany. As an indication of the cave's age, Hasenmayer claimed that underwater stalactites at the back of the cave were several million years old, but scientific investigation of a drip stone yielded an age of well under 10,000 years. Hasenmayer's theory was published in 1986, but many scientists are sceptical of his claim.

Hasenmayer has been awarded the Order of Merit of the Federal Republic of Germany.

== Personal life ==
Hasenmayer met his life partner Gaby Barth at a clinic during his rehabilitation from his decompression accident. They live in Birkenfeld, near Pforzheim.
