= Karl Stirner (painter) =

German painter (1882–1943)

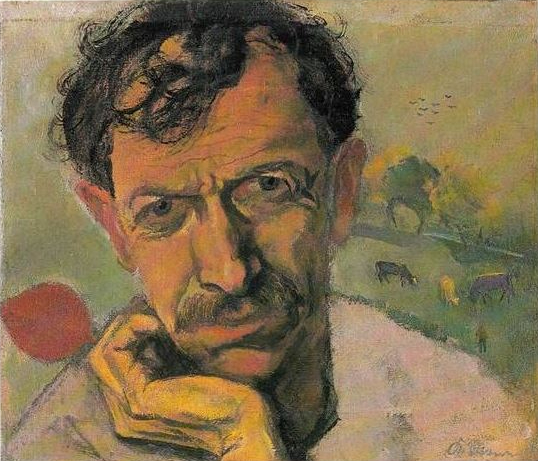
Self-portrait (1927)

Karl Stirner (4 November 1882 – 21 June 1943) was a German painter, watercolorist, illustrator and writer.

== Life ==
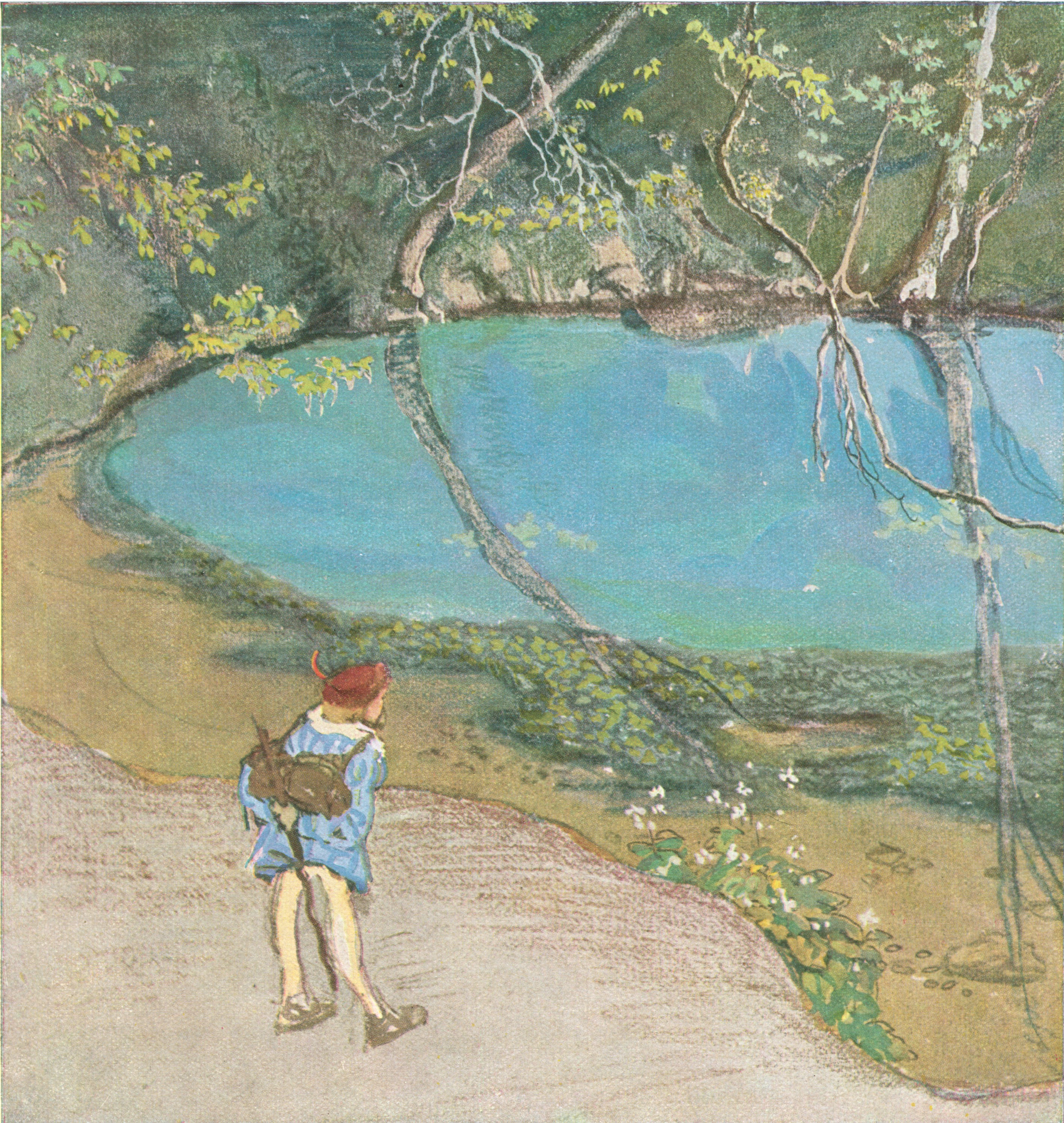
At Blautopf, an illustration from Das Stuttgarter Hutzelmännlein

Karl Stirner was born on 4 November 1882 in Rosenberg, Baden-Württemberg. He came from a family of handymen and farmers. His father went to America before he was born, and disappeared. His mother, Josepha, made her living as a maid. After completing his primary education, in 1896, he was apprenticed to a decorative painter and carpenter named Severin Weber, in Ellwangen. While there, he also took drawing classes in the evening.

Following the death of his mother, in 1899, their home had to auctioned off and he was destitute, so he became a journeyman painter and began the customary wanderjahre. After his return in 1906, thanks to a scholarship, he briefly attended the Kunstgewerbeschule in Stuttgart, where he studied with the graphic artist, Hans von Kolb. Overall, however, he was dissatisfied with the courses there.

His first major success came in 1913 with the illustrations for Das Stuttgarter Hutzelmännlein, a fairy tale by Eduard Mörike. That same year, in an effort to improve his chronic bronchitis, he took a trip to Algeria. After returning, he had to enter a hospital in Agra, Switzerland, for treatment. While there, he met Hermann Hesse, and became a member of his "Library for German Prisoners of War".

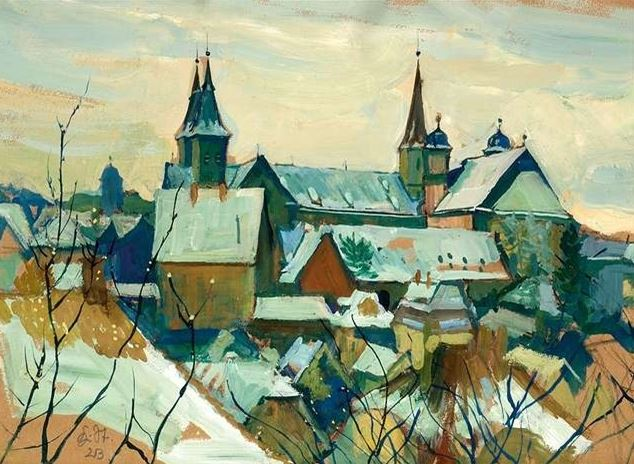
View of the Monastery Church, Ellwangen

He also met the Expressionist painter, Ernst Ludwig Kirchner, who had a significant influence on his future artistic development. After the war, in 1919, he worked with Kirchner in the Alps, near Davos. He then made several visits to Sicily, where he tried out his new color palette painting landscapes.

In 1921, he returned to Germany and settled in Ellwangen. There, he married Pauline Wagner, and they had four children. He started a family and began to write poems and stories, accompanied by his own illustrations. He made a second trip to Algeria in 1929, and accompanied his friend, the church painter Alois Schenk, on a tour of Palestine. He returned in 1932, and was commissioned to illustrate the primer for the Catholic elementary schools in Württemberg, which was reprinted for many decades.

During the 1930s, his lung condition worsened and eventually prevented him from working. After several hospital stays, he died on 21 June 1943 at the Deaconess Hospital in Schwäbisch Hall and was interred in Rosenberg.
