= Aachtopf =

Karst spring in Germany

Coordinates: 47°50′48″N 8°51′29″E

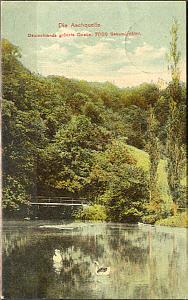
Aachtopf historical postcard, 1910

The Aachtopf (German: [ˈaːxtɔpf]) is Germany's biggest karst spring, south of the western end of the Swabian Jura near the town of Aach. It produces an average of 8,500 litres per second. Most of the water stems from the River Danube where it disappears underground at the Danube Sinkhole, 12 kilometres (7.5 mi) north near Immendingen and about 14 kilometres (8.7 mi) north near Fridingen. The cave system has been explored since the 1960s, but as of 2020 only a small part has been discovered due to a large blockage after a few hundred metres.

== Etymology ==
The name Aachtopf is compounded from Aach (meaning "water" in Old High German); Topf can be translated as "bowl" and is commonly used for round, bowl-shaped springs.

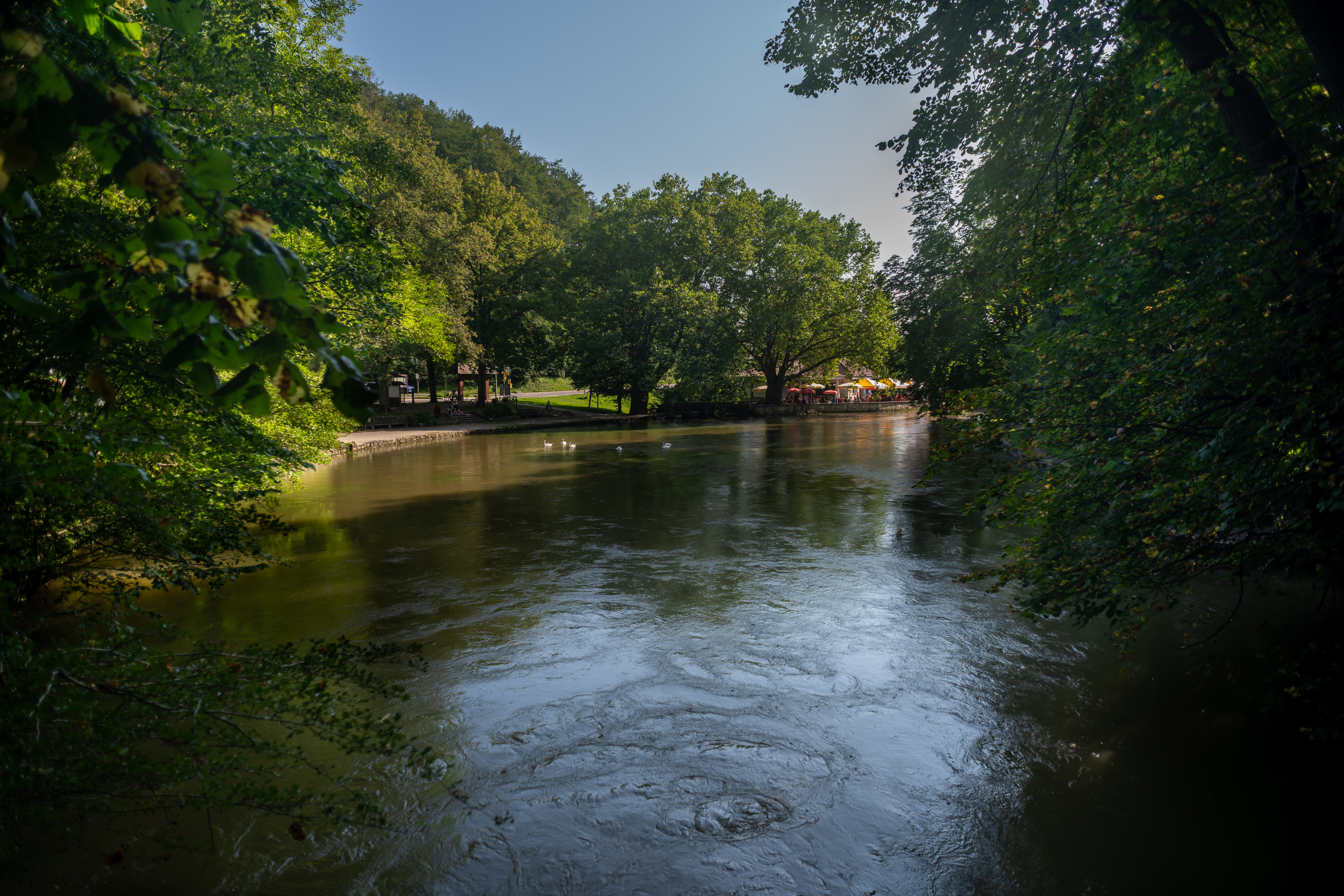
Aachtopf view from spring towards river

== Geography ==
The Aachtopf is a karst spring, south of the western end of the Swabian Jura near the town of Aach. The spring is the source of the river Radolfzeller Aach, which flows southward into Lake Constance, and empties into the Rhine.

=== Origin ===
The spring marks the southern end of a cave system that transports water from the western end of the Swabian Jura. It produces an average of 8,500 litres per second. Production varies seasonally and in response to the weather, but the spring never runs dry. Most of the water is derived from the Danube where it disappears underground at the Donauversickerung (Danube Sinkhole) near Immendingen and Fridingen. The Rhine's steeper gradient on its much shorter route to the North Sea creates stronger headward erosion than that of the much older River Danube (see the Danube upper river geology). This stream capture of the upper Danube and its surface tributaries is expected to cause the long-term disappearance of the Danube drainage entirely in favour of the Rhine.

The Danube flows eastwards into the Black Sea, whereas the Rhine flows northwards to the North Sea. Therefore, the water of the Aach flows under the European watershed. This is a relatively common feature of karst stream captures.

The karst spring is connected to a huge cave, which runs northwards. The cave is completely water-filled and can only be explored by cave divers.

== History of exploration ==
In 1719, F. W. Bräuninger published his hypothesis that the water of the spring originated from the Danube. On 9 October 1877, the geologist Adolf Knop from Karlsruhe Technical College laced the water in the Danube basin with 10 kg sodium fluorescein, 20 zentner (1000 kg) of salt and 1200 kg of shale oil. After 60 hours he was able to detect all three substances in the spring, as evidenced by "splendidly green, salt water with a distinct creosote taste".

In 1886, the first attempt to dive down the Aachtopf (and one of the world’s first cave dives) was made, to 12 metres (39 ft), at the location of a bottleneck where the water has a strong flow.

In 1960, the first exploration of the cave was made by Jochen Hasenmayer, a famous German cave diver. 120 metres (390 ft) from the spring the syphon opens into a cavern, the "Seenhalle" (Lake Hall). A collapse blocks the cave after 600 metres (2,000 ft). The cave is expected to continue for several kilometres on the other side of the blockage.

In 1990, a local caving club was formed to find the lost cave segment towards the Danube basin by digging a shaft behind the collapse at the bottom of a large sink hole. In 1995, members discovered a cavern at 70 metres (230 ft) deep, which they dubbed the Grey Hall, and in 2003 another cavern with a lake, which Rudi Martin has described in a report. The group has published maps of the "Donauhöhle".

As of 2020, exploration is ongoing and the continuation of the cave has not been discovered.

== Fauna ==
In 2015, the only known cavefish in Europe, a Barbatula loach, was discovered in the Danube–Aachtopf system.

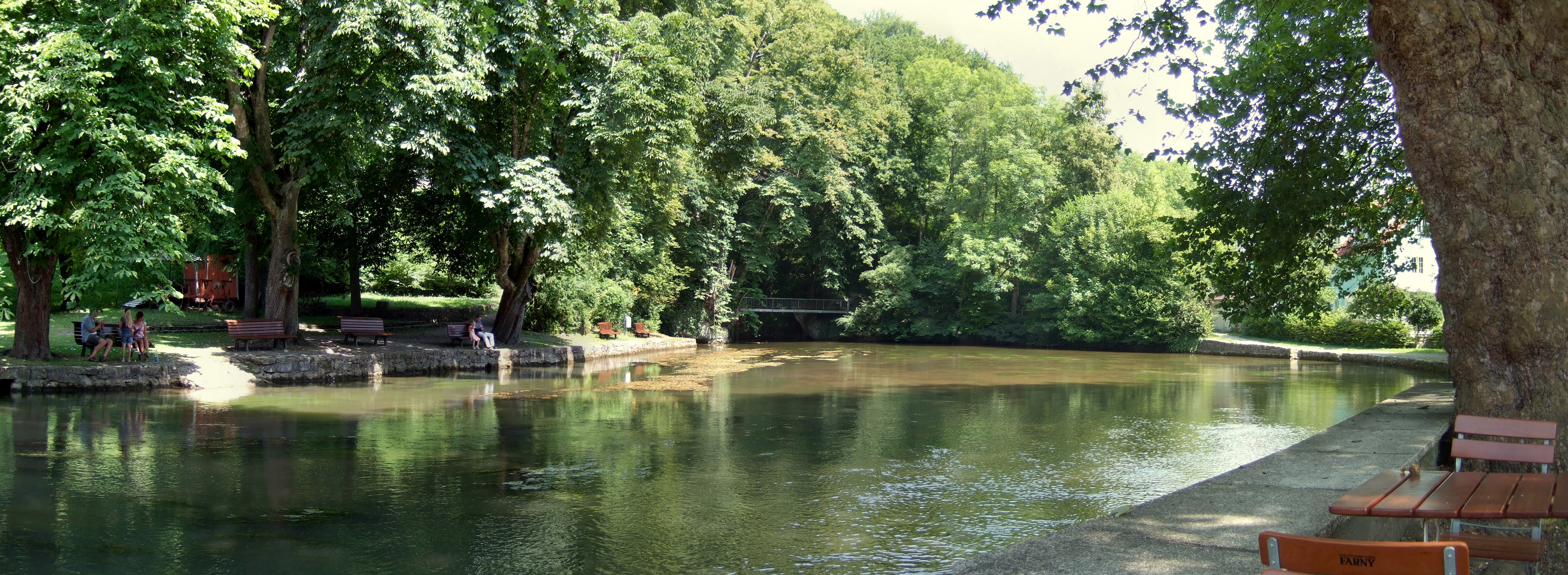
Panorama
