= Barbatula compressirostris =

Scientific classification
- Domain: Eukaryota
- Kingdom: Animalia
- Phylum: Chordata
- Class: Actinopterygii
- Order: Cypriniformes
- Family: Nemacheilidae
- Genus: Barbatula
- Species: B. compressirostris

Binomial name
- Barbatula compressirostris (Warpachowski, 1897)

Species of fish

Barbatula compressirostris is a species of ray-finned fish in the genus Barbatula. It is native to the Khovd River drainage in Mongolia, and possibly Russia.
