= Blautopf =

Karst source of the river Blau in Germany

Coordinates: 48°24′57″N 9°47′02″E

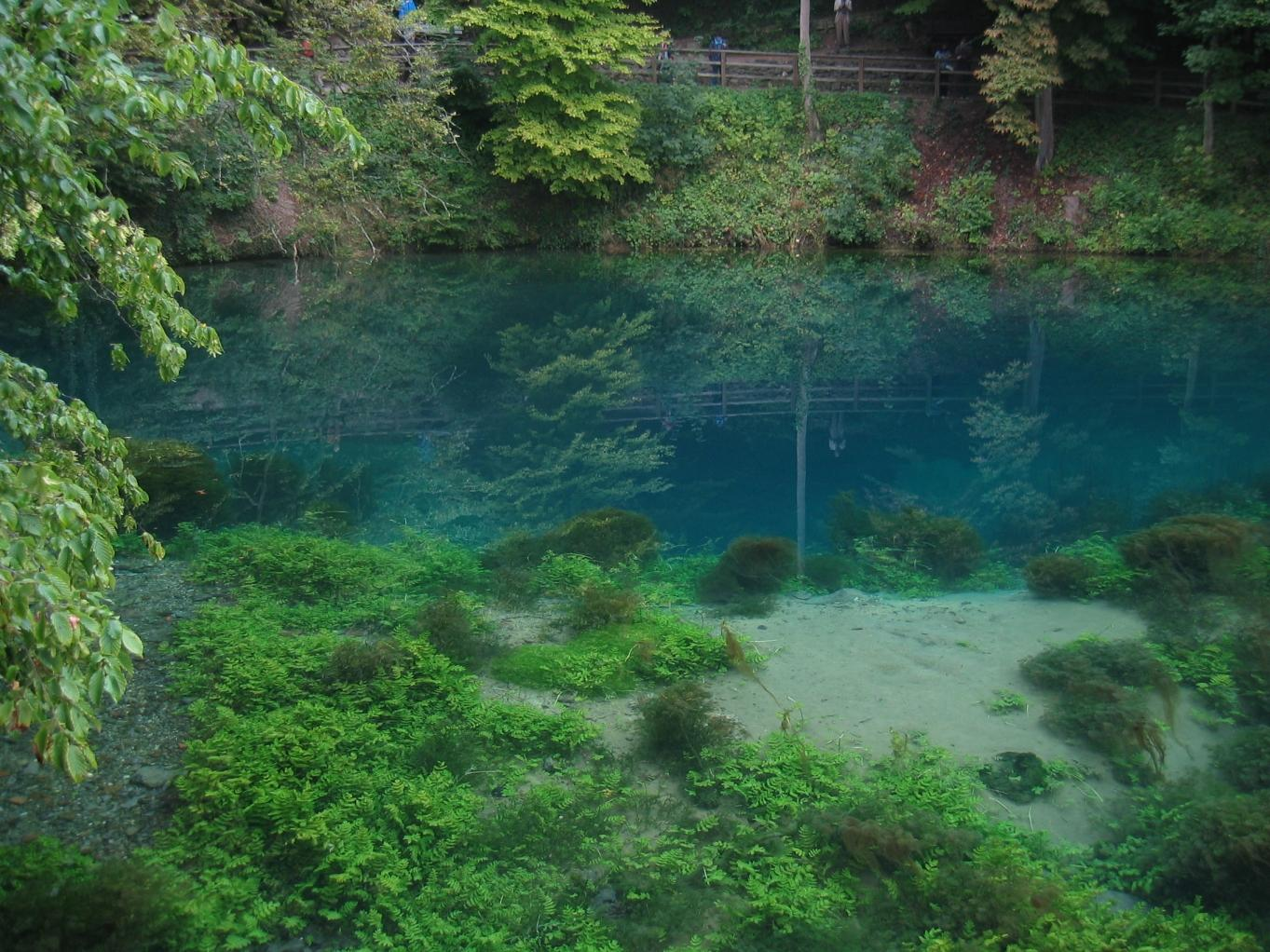
Blautopf with the bright limestone sediments underwater

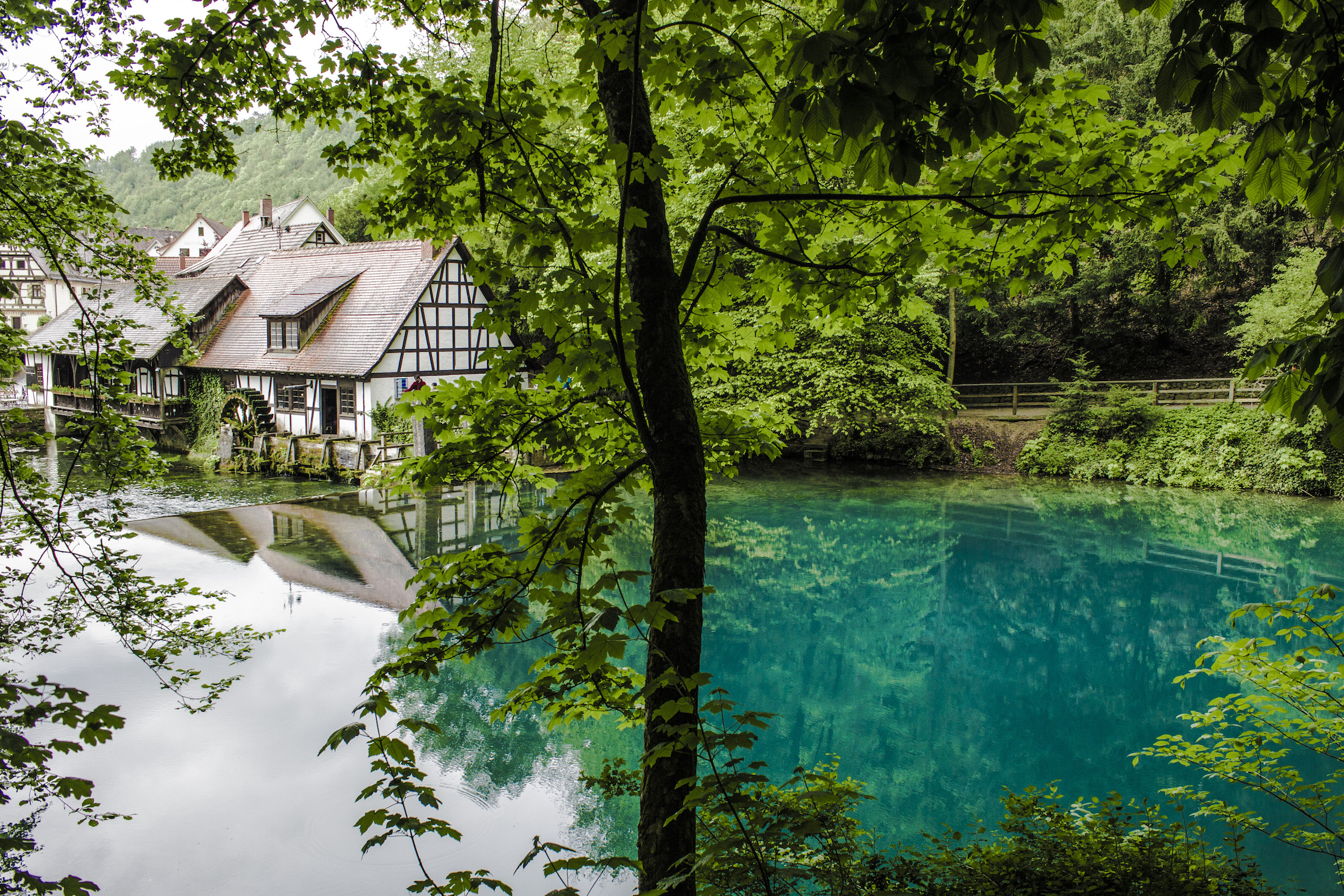
Blautopf with hammer mill

The Blautopf (German pronunciation: [ˈblaʊˌtɔpf], lit. 'Blue pot') is a spring that is considered the source of the river Blau in the karst landscape on the Swabian Jura's southern edge. It is located in Blaubeuren, Alb-Donau-Kreis, Baden-Württemberg, Germany (approximately 16 km (9.9 mi) west of Ulm).

== Description ==
It forms the drain for the Blau cave system; the river Blau after 14.5 km (9.0 mi) flows into the river Danube in the city of Ulm. Because of its high water pressure, the spring has developed a funnel-like shape with a depth of 21 metres (69 ft). The water's peculiarly blue color, varying in intensity depending on weather and flow, is the result of physical properties of the nanoscale limestone particles densely distributed in the water. They cause Rayleigh scattering of light, preferentially scattering the blue color of the visible light. A similar effect is observed at the Blue Lagoon near Reykjavík, where the color originates from nanoscale silica particles.

On the banks of the Blautopf is located a hammer mill driven by the water of the spring. A film documenting the exploration of the cave is shown at the same location.

== Geology ==
The Blautopf is a spring in a karst environment. One characteristic of a karst environment is that water, which drains quickly through the limestone in one area, surfaces in another. Karst environments only have subterranean drainage, and there are no bodies of water above ground. Therefore, the size of the Blautopf depends greatly on the level of rainfall, though it never entirely dries out. The Blautopf is the second largest spring in Germany, after the Aachtopf.

Over millennia, subterranean water has created a huge system of caves in the area. Prominent examples are the Blauhöhle (Blau-cave), discovered by Jochen Hasenmayer in 1985, and the Apokalypse (Apocalypse), discovered on 23 September 2006 by Jochen Malmann and Andreas Kücha, members of the Arbeitsgemeinschaft Blautopf, a club dedicated to the exploration of the Blautopf's cave system. While the Blauhöhle is completely filled with water for a length of about 1,500 metres (approximately 4,935 ft), the Apokalypse is dry; because of its dimensions—170 metres long, 50 metres wide, 50 metres high—it is a special feature of the region.

== Diving ==
The entry to the Blauhöhle lies at a depth of about 22 meters (about 70 ft). Therefore, access is restricted to experienced and well-trained divers. In the 1980s, city authorities were forced to prohibit diving in the Blautopf after several accidents, including some fatal ones. Permission to dive in the Blautopf has only been granted to a few organizations: among them, the Arbeitsgemeinschaft Blautopf, a group of scientific speleologists led by Jochen Hasenmayer, and rescue services. The most recent fatal accident occurred in 2003, killing Bernd Aspacher, a member of Hasenmayer's team.

Diving and exploration of the extensive cave system underlying the Blautopf and its neighboring caves are ongoing. Researchers have performed digs at two air shaft locations nearby, creating man-sized entrances into the Seligengrund Cave and the Hessenhau Cave to allow for research, exploration, and mapping. This allowed researchers to trace the sources of the water at Blautopf definitively. While no connection has yet been mapped between the Hessenhau Cave and Blauhöhle, the two cave systems are connected by underground rivers: "dye tracing clearly demonstrated the hydraulic connection, it also showed that two independent underground rivers (Ur-Blau and Nordblau) are flowing through Blauhöhlensystem and Hessenhau Cave, respectively – each providing about half the water surfacing at Blautopf Resurgence." Diving exploration remains slow, painstaking, and dangerous. Dive time is very limited due to the small spaces and remote locations which require tiny dive tanks and specially designed rebreathers.

== Legends ==
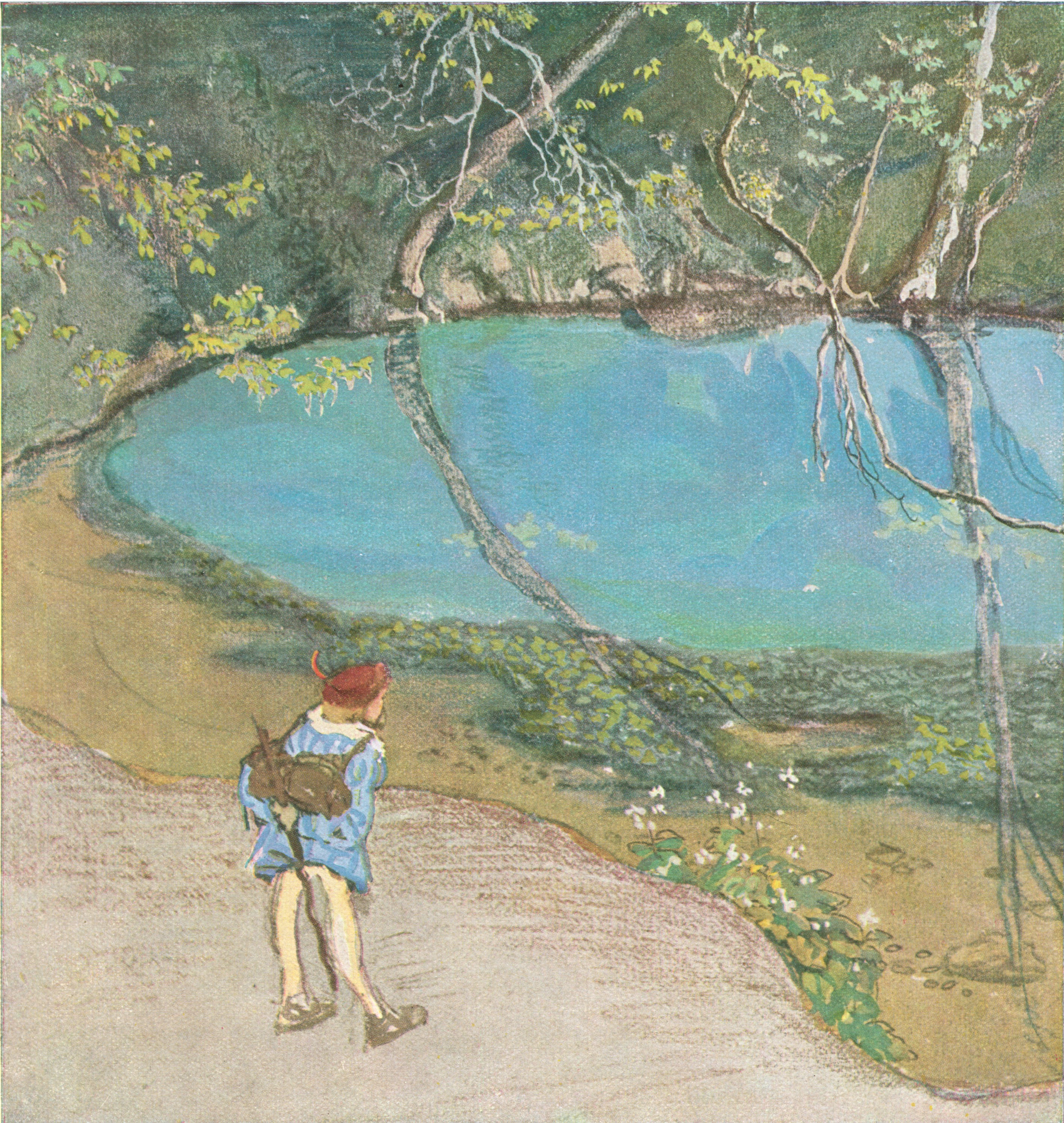
At Blautopf, by Karl Stirner; an illustration for Das Stuttgarter Hutzelmännlein (1913 ed.)

Numerous legends and folk tales refer to the Blautopf. Its characteristic colour was explained by the account that every day someone would pour a vat of ink into the Blautopf. Another myth stated that every time someone tried to measure the Blautopf's depth with a leaden sounding line, a water nix stole the sounding line. Therefore, it was not possible to determine the depth of the Blautopf. Because of this tale, there is a rock called Klötzle Blei ("little block of lead" in the local dialect) in the vicinity of the Blautopf. A well-known tongue-twister in the Swabian dialect told to local children, refers to this rock:

Glei bei Blaubeira leit a Kletzle Blei –
´s leit a Kletzle Blei glei bei Blaubeira

Standard High German:

Gleich bei Blaubeuren liegt ein Klötzchen Blei –
Es liegt ein Klötzchen Blei gleich bei Blaubeuren

English Translation:

Near Blaubeuren, there lies a block of lead –
There lies a block of lead near Blaubeuren

The novelist and poet Eduard Mörike incorporated this folklore and other tales into the romantic novella Das Stuttgarter Hutzelmännlein. They were woven into the background story of a journeyman travelling from Stuttgart to Blaubeuren. In particular, the story of the Schöne Lau, a mermaid, and her husband, a male water-nix from the Black Sea, is told in great detail. Because the Schöne Lau could not laugh, the nix punished her by confining her to the Blautopf, and only allowing her to have still-born children. He would only allow her to return and give birth to a living child once she had laughed five times. In the end, the landlady of the inn Nonnenhof came to her aid. (The complete German text is available at Eduard Mörike: Die Schöne Lau.)

== Bibliography ==
- Faszination Blautopf. Thorbecke Jan Verlag. 2009. p. 136. ISBN 978-3799508315. OCLC 316307940.
