= Elta (river) =

River in Germany

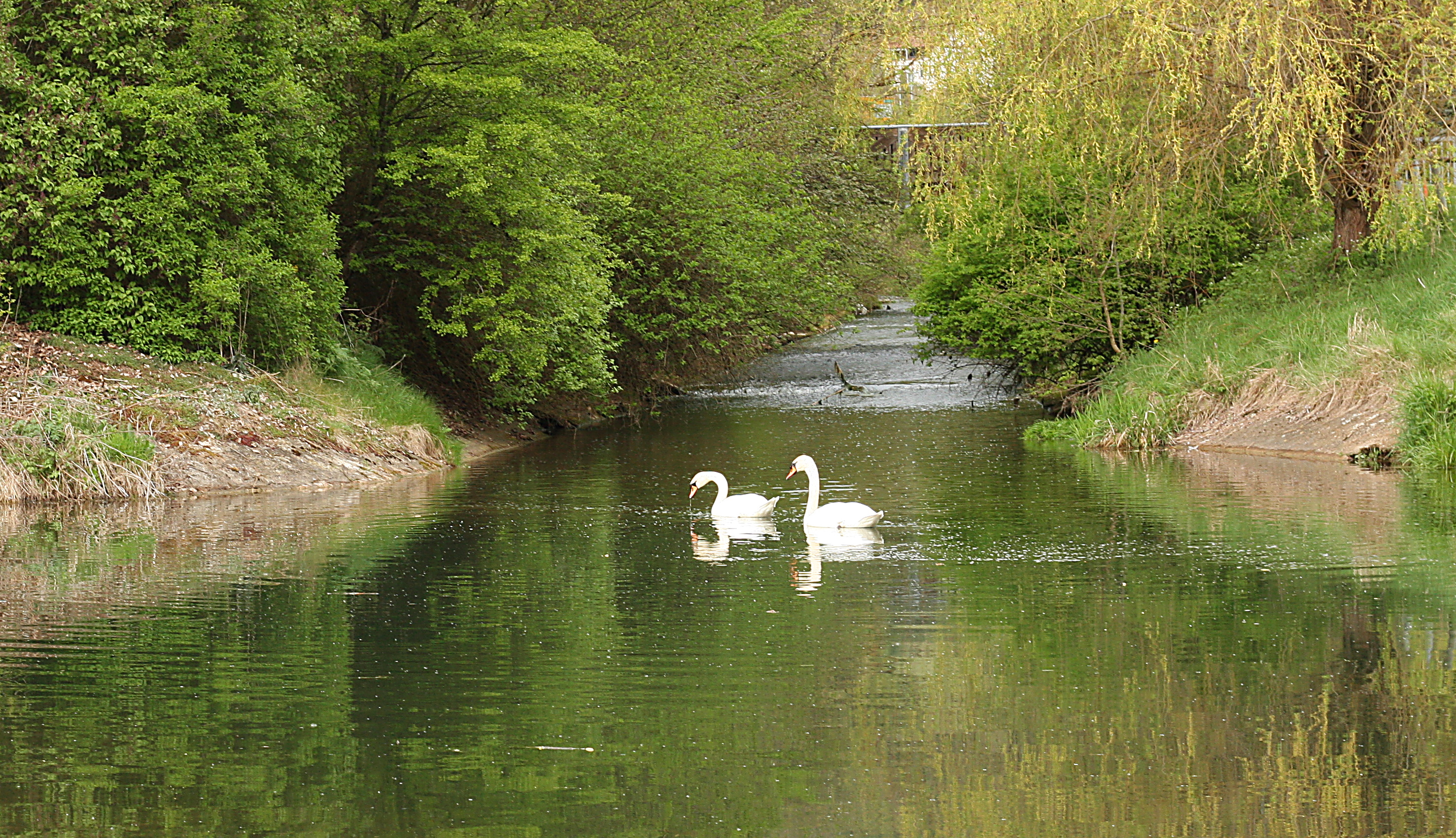

Location
- Country: Germany
- State: Baden-Württemberg

Physical characteristics
- Mouth
  - location: Danube
  - coordinates: 47.9851°N 8.8013°E
- Length: 15.8 km (9.8 mi)

Basin features
- Progression: Danube→ Black Sea

The Elta is a river of Baden-Württemberg, Germany. It flows into the Danube in Tuttlingen.

== See also ==
- List of rivers of Baden-Württemberg
