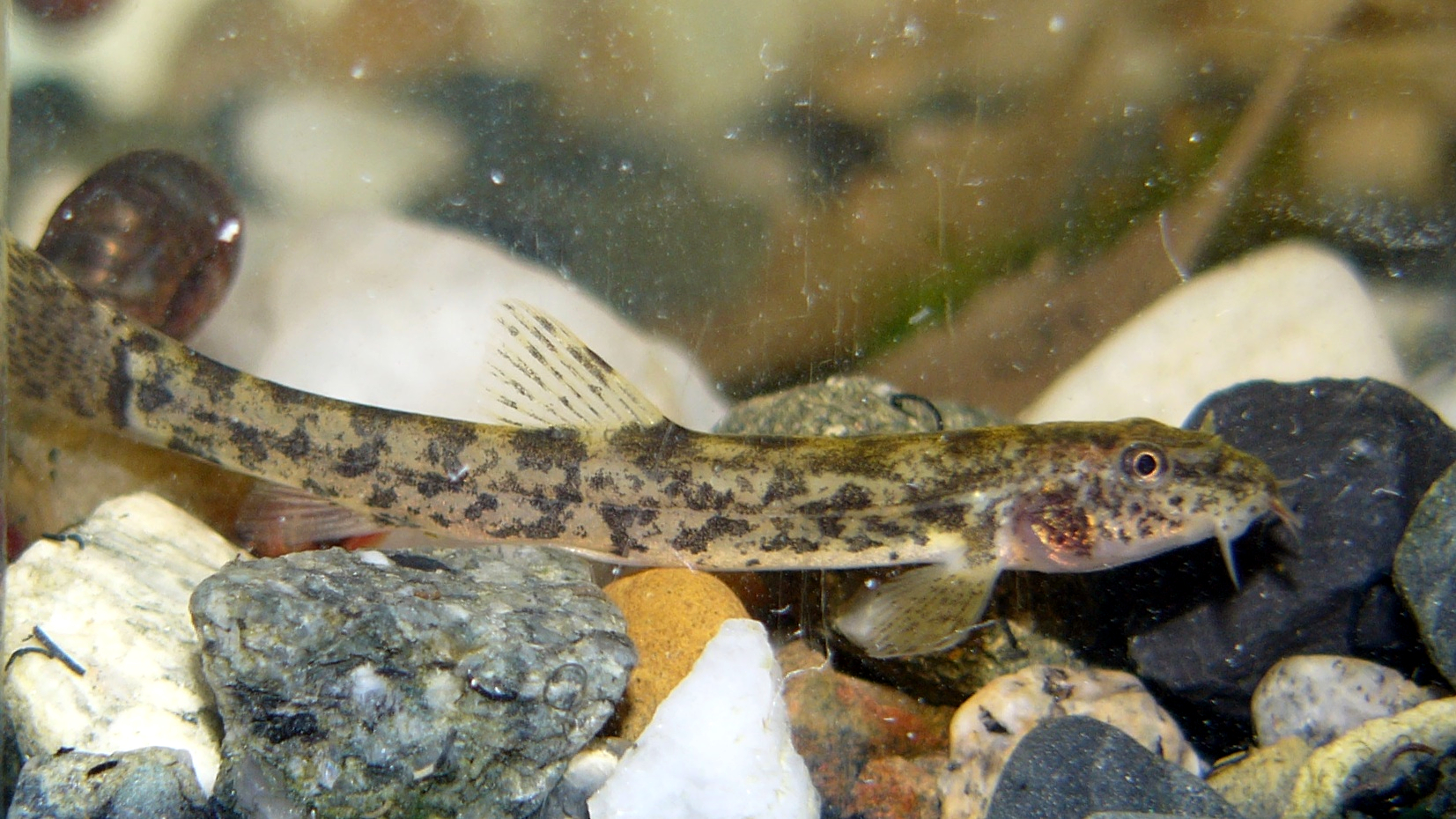

Conservation status
- Least Concern (IUCN 3.1)

Scientific classification
- Kingdom: Animalia
- Phylum: Chordata
- Class: Actinopterygii
- Division: Teleostei
- Order: Cypriniformes
- Family: Nemacheilidae
- Genus: Barbatula
- Species: B. barbatula

Binomial name
- Barbatula barbatula (Linnaeus, 1758)

Synonyms
- Cobitis barbatulus Linnaeus, 1758; Nemacheilus barbatulus (Linnaeus, 1758); Orthrias barbatulus (Linnaeus, 1758); Cobitis furstenbergii Bonaparte, 1846; Cobitis variabilis Günther, 1868; Orthrias oreas Jordan & Fowler, 1903; Barbatula oreas (Jordan & Fowler, 1903); Nemacheilus sibiricus Gratzianov, 1907

= Stone loach =

Species of fish

The stone loach (Barbatula barbatula) is a European species of fresh water ray-finned fish in the family Nemacheilidae. It is one of 33 species in the genus Barbatula. Stone loaches live amongst the gravel and stones of fast flowing water where they can search for food. The most distinctive feature of this small fish is the presence of barbels around the bottom jaw, which they use to detect their invertebrate prey. The body is a mixture of brown, green and yellow.

== Description ==
The stone loach is a small, slender bottom-dwelling fish that can grow to a length of 21 cm (8.3 in), but typically is around 12 cm (5 in). Its eyes are situated high on its head and it has three pairs of short barbels on its lower jaw below its mouth. It has a rounded body that is not much laterally flattened and is a little less deep in the body than the spined loach (Cobitis taenia) and lacks that fish's spines beneath the eye. It has rounded dorsal and caudal fins with their tips slightly notched, but the spined loach has even more rounded fins. The general colour of this fish is yellowish-brown with blotches and vertical bands of darker colour. An indistinct dark line runs from the snout to the eye. The fins are brownish with faint dark banding.

== Distribution and habitat ==
The stone loach is a common species and is found over most of Europe in suitable clear rivers and streams with gravel and sandy bottoms. It is present in upland areas, also chalk streams, lakes and reservoirs as long as the water is well-oxygenated. These fish sometimes venture into estuaries but not into brackish water. They live on the bottom, often partly buried, and they are particularly active at night when they rootle among the sand and gravel for the small invertebrates on which they feed.

It is found in Baltic states, Eastern Europe, Austria, Belgium, Bulgaria, Czech Republic, Denmark, Finland, France, Germany, Hungary, Ireland, Italy, Liechtenstein, Luxembourg, Moldova, the Netherlands, Poland, Romania, Serbia and Montenegro, Slovakia, Slovenia, Spain, Sweden, Switzerland, and the United Kingdom. It has been extirpated from Greece.

== Biology ==
The larvae of stone loaches are benthic, they and small juveniles prefer sandy substrates with a slower current, as they grow they move on to gravel bottoms and faster currents. As adults they prey on relatively large benthic invertebrates such as gammarids, chironomids and other insect larvae. It normally feeds at nights when it uses the barbels around its mouth to detect its prey. They are tolerant of moderate organic pollution and stream canalization but they are highly sensitive to heavy metal pollution, chemical pollution and low oxygen levels which mean that the presence of stone loaches in a river is an indicator of good water quality. They are short-lived fish, normally living to age 3–4 years with 5 years being exceptional.

Stone loaches breed over gravel or sand or among aquatic vegetation. In streams with low productivity spawning may be annual but where the water has higher productivity there may be multiple spawning events within a season. The females release eggs in open water, often close to the surface. The eggs drift and adhere to different substrates and are often covered by sand or detritus. A female stone loach may spawn each day for short periods. In Great Britain spawning lasts from April to August and the females may lay as many as 10,000 eggs.
