= List of dialling codes in Germany =

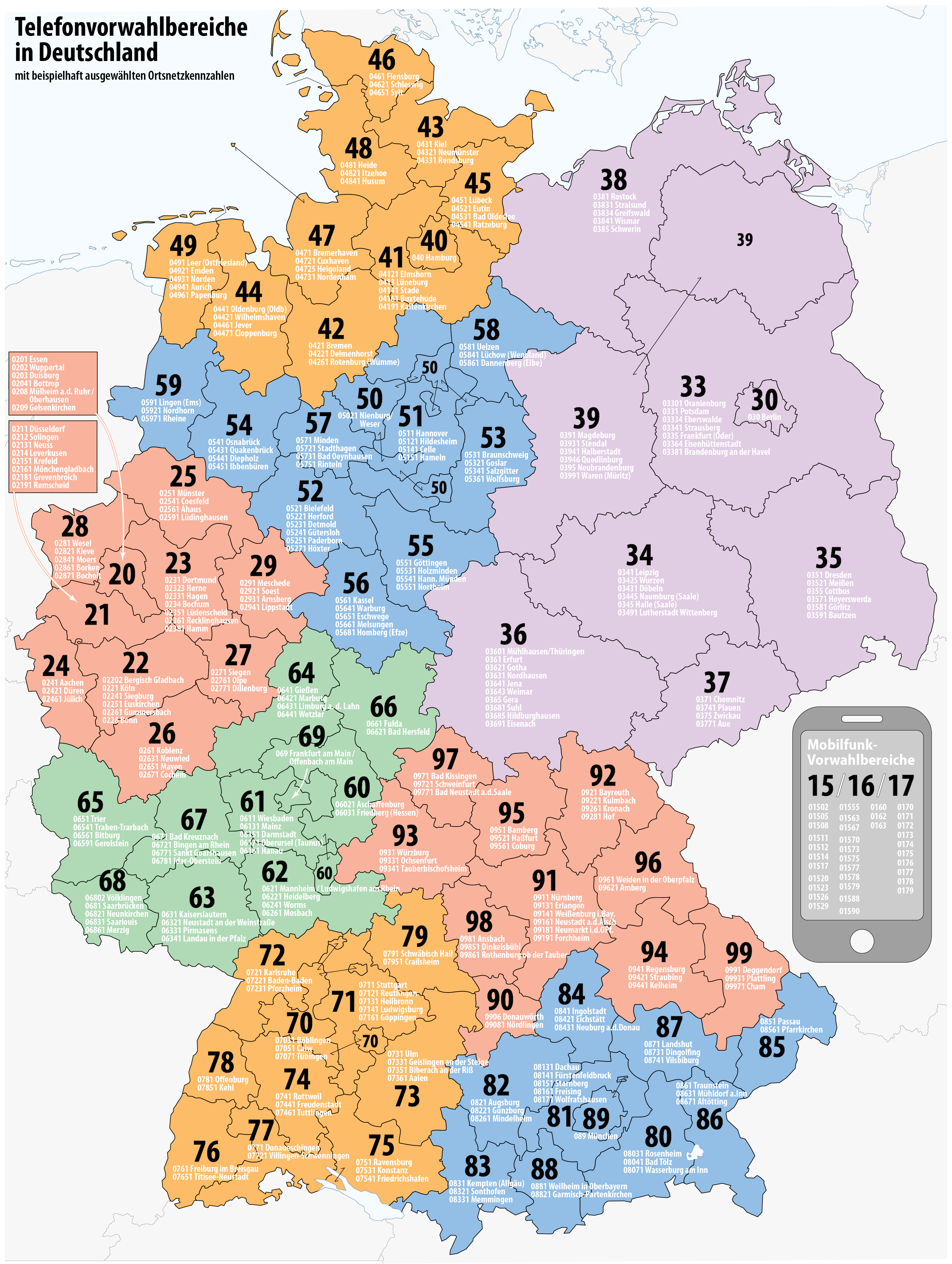
Area code zones in Germany

The telephone numbering plan of Germany is an open numbering plan, with a variable number of digits in the area code (German: Vorwahl) as well as in the subscribers' directory telephone number. Area codes in Germany have two to five digits. The prefix digit 0 (trunk prefix) must be dialed when calling between numbering plan areas within Germany. When calling via fixed-line networks within the same area, the area code is not required. In general, shorter area codes are assigned to larger cities, and longer area codes to smaller localities. Subscriber telephone numbers are usually inversely in size: those in larger cities have seven or eight digits, while those in smaller places may have as few as three digits. Area codes are grouped into eight geographic dialing regions determined by the first digit (2–9). Area codes beginning with 2 are found in the west, those with 3 in the east, those with 4 in the north, those with 5 in the north central part, those with 6 in the south-central part, those with 7 in the southwest, those with 8 in the south, and the 9s are found in the southeast.

Prefixes starting with 1 are special numbers, such as mobile telephones (15, 16, 17), shared-cost services (180), televoting numbers (13), and 10 for dial-around services. The former codes of 130 for freephone numbers and 190 for premium-rate numbers are moved to 800 and 900 to meet international standards. 700 is used for personal national phone numbers.

The ITU country code in the E.164 international numbering plan is 49. Outgoing calls to international destinations are dialed with the prefix 00, followed by the destination country code, area code, and telephone number.

== General prefixes ==
- Telephone country code: 49
- International call prefix: 00
- Trunk prefix: 0

== 1 ==
Prefix 1 is used for special numbers, and is not tied to a geographic area.

=== 10 ===
- 10 call-by-call (dial-around-services – alternative carrier)

=== 11 ===
- 11 formerly value-added services
  - 115 Public service number for German administration

=== 12 ===
- 12 innovative services
  - 12-12 Web.de, Karlsruhe, between €0.13 and €1.86 per minute
  - 12-230 tesion, Stuttgart
  - 12-3000 3U Telecom, Marburg
  - 12-3131 BBA Netkom, Hamburg
  - 12-3333 BBA Netkom, Hamburg
  - 12-3456 CommAssist, Lübeck

=== 13 ===
- 13 voting and lottery numbers
  - 130 formerly toll-free numbers, now unassigned (now 800)
  - 137 Mass traffic services
    - 1371 €0.14 per call
    - 1372 €0.14 per minute
    - 1373 €0.14 per minute
    - 1374 €0.14 per minute
    - 1375 €0.14 per call
    - 1376 €0.25 per call
    - 1377 €1.00 per call
    - 1378 €0.50 per call
    - 1379 €0.50 per call
  - 138 T-VoteCall €0.14 per minute

=== 14 ===
- 14 unassigned

=== 15 ===
- 15 mobile phones
  - 150 reserved for Group 3G/Quam
  - 151 T-Mobile
  - 152 reserved for Vodafone
    - 1520 Vodafone
    - 1521 Lycamobile
    - 1522 Vodafone
    - 1523 Vodafone
    - 1525 Vodafone
  - 155 reserved for E-Plus
  - 156 reserved for Mobilcom
  - 157 reserved for E-Plus
    - 1570 vistream
    - 1573 ALDITalk
    - 1577 E-Plus
    - 1579 sipgate
  - 159 reserved for O_{2} Germany

=== 16 ===
- 16 mobile phones, Trunked radio system, Pager
  - 160 T-Mobile
  - 161 formerly analog C-Netz
  - 162 Vodafone
  - 163 E-Plus
  - 164 Cityruf (e*message)
  - 165 formerly Quix
  - 166 Telmi (e*message)
  - 167 Trunked radio systems
    - 1672 Dolphin Telecom
  - 168 Scall (e*message)
  - 169 Cityruf, Scall, Skyper (e*cityruf, e*message, e*skyper)

=== 17 ===
- 17 mobile phones
  - 170 T-Mobile
  - 171 T-Mobile
  - 172 Vodafone
  - 173 Vodafone
  - 174 Vodafone
  - 175 T-Mobile
  - 176 O_{2} Germany
  - 177 E-Plus
  - 178 E-Plus
  - 179 O_{2} Germany

=== 18 ===
- 18 international virtual private networks (IVPNs) and shared-cost services
  - 180 shared-cost services
    - 1801 €0.039 per minute
    - 1802 €0.06 per connection
    - 1803 €0.09 per minute
    - 1804 €0.20 per connection
    - 1805 €0.14 per minute
  - 181 international virtual private networks (IVPNs)
  - 182 closed user groups
  - 183 closed user groups
    - 1835 DB Netz (Deutsche Bahn) - User group for GSM-R when calling from German Telephone Network
  - 184 closed user groups
  - 185 closed user groups
  - 186 closed user groups
  - 187 closed user groups
  - 188 closed user groups
  - 1888 IVBB (Informationsverbund Berlin-Bonn)
  - 189 closed user groups

=== 19 ===
- 190 formerly premium-rate services, now unassigned (now 900)
- 191 online services
- 192 online services
- 193 online services
- 194 online services
- 1987 Routing numbers for (0)116xxx
- 1988 target network service identification for routing international toll-free value-added services (Freecall)
- 1989 routing numbers for outgoing services
- 199 network-internal traffic control

== 2 ==
=== 20 – Western Ruhrgebiet (Essen and surroundings) ===
- 201 Essen
- 202 Wuppertal
- 203 Duisburg
- 204
  - 2041 Bottrop
  - 2043 Gladbeck
  - 2045 Bottrop-Kirchhellen
- 205
  - 2051 Velbert
  - 2052 Velbert-Langenberg (Rheinland)
  - 2053 Velbert-Neviges
  - 2054 Essen-Kettwig, Mülheim an der Ruhr-Mintard
  - 2056 Heiligenhaus
  - 2058 Wülfrath
- 206
  - 2064 Dinslaken
  - 2065 Duisburg-Rheinhausen
  - 2066 Duisburg-Homberg (Rheinland)
- 208 Mülheim an der Ruhr/Oberhausen
- 209 Gelsenkirchen

=== 21 – Düsseldorf and surroundings ===
- 210
  - 2101 formerly Neuss and Kaarst (no longer valid)
  - 2102 Ratingen
  - 2104 Mettmann
- 211 Düsseldorf
- 212 Solingen
  - 2129 Haan (Rheinland)
- 213
  - 2131 Neuss, Kaarst
  - 2132 Meerbusch-Büderich (Düsseldorf)
  - 2133 Dormagen
  - 2137 Neuss-Norf
- 214 Leverkusen
- 215
  - 2150 Meerbusch-Lank-Latum
  - 2151 Krefeld
  - 2152 Kempen
  - 2153 Nettetal-Lobberich
  - 2154 Willich
  - 2156 Willich-Anrath
  - 2157 Nettetal-Kaldenkirchen/Brüggen
  - 2158 Grefrath/Nettetal
  - 2159 Meerbusch-Osterath
- 216
  - 2161 Mönchengladbach
  - 2162 Viersen
  - 2163 Schwalmtal
  - 2164 Jüchen-Otzenrath
  - 2165 Jüchen
  - 2166 Rheydt
- 217
  - 2171 Leverkusen-Opladen
  - 2173 Langenfeld (Rheinland), Leverkusen-Hitdorf
  - 2174 Burscheid (Rheinland), Leichlingen-Witzhelden
  - 2175 Leichlingen
- 218
  - 2181 Grevenbroich
  - 2182 Grevenbroich-Kapellen
  - 2183 Rommerskirchen
- 219
  - 2191 Remscheid
  - 2192 Hückeswagen
  - 2193 Wermelskirchen-Dabringhausen
  - 2195 Radevormwald
  - 2196 Wermelskirchen

=== 22 – Cologne and surroundings ===
- 220
  - 2202 Bergisch Gladbach
  - 2203 Köln-Porz
  - 2204 Bergisch Gladbach-Bensberg, OT Untereschbach von Overath
  - 2205 Rösrath
  - 2206 Overath; parts of Lohmar
  - 2207 Dürscheid; parts of Overath
  - 2208 Niederkassel
- 221 Köln (Cologne)
- 222
  - 2222 Bornheim, Roisdorf
  - 2223 Königswinter
  - 2224 Bad Honnef
  - 2225 Meckenheim (Rheinland); parts of Wachtberg
  - 2226 Rheinbach
  - 2227 Merten, Walberberg, Sechtem
  - 2228 Rolandseck
- 223
  - 2232 Brühl (Rheinland); Berzdorf von Wesseling, Köln-Meschenich
  - 2233 Hürth (Rheinland); Köln-Rondorf
  - 2234 Frechen; Lövenich, Köln-Marsdorf and Köln-Weiden
  - 2235 Erftstadt
  - 2236 Wesseling (Rheinland); Köln-Godorf, Köln-Hahnwald, Köln-Immendorf, Köln-Rodenkirchen, Köln-Sürth and Köln-Weiß
  - 2237 Kerpen (Rheinland)
  - 2238 Pulheim
- 224
  - 2241 Siegburg/Sankt Augustin/Troisdorf
  - 2242 Hennef (Sieg)
  - 2243 Eitorf
  - 2244 Oberpleis
  - 2245 Much
  - 2246 Lohmar
  - 2247 Neunkirchen-Seelscheid
  - 2248 Uckerath
- 225
  - 2251 Euskirchen
  - 2252 Zülpich
  - 2253 Bad Münstereifel
  - 2254 Weilerswist
  - 2255 Euskirchen-Flamersheim
  - 2256 Mechernich-Satzvey
  - 2257 Reckerscheid
- 226
  - 2261 Gummersbach
  - 2262 Wiehl
  - 2263 Engelskirchen
  - 2264 Marienheide
  - 2265 Eckenhagen
  - 2266 Lindlar
  - 2267 Wipperfürth
  - 2268 Kürten
  - 2269 Rönsahl
- 227
  - 2271 Bergheim
  - 2272 Bedburg
  - 2273 Kerpen-Horrem
  - 2274 Elsdorf (Rheinland)
  - 2275 Kerpen-Buir
- 228 Bonn; Niederkassel-Mondorf
- 229
  - 2291 Waldbröl
  - 2292 Windeck (Sieg)
  - 2293 Nümbrecht
  - 2294 Morsbach (Sieg)
  - 2295 Ruppichteroth
  - 2296 Brüchermühle
  - 2297 Wildbergerhütte

=== 23 – Dortmund and surroundings ===
- 230
  - 2301 Holzwickede
  - 2302 Witten
  - 2303 Unna
  - 2304 Schwerte
  - 2305 Castrop-Rauxel
  - 2306 Lünen
  - 2307 Kamen/Bergkamen
  - 2308 Unna-Hemmerde
  - 2309 Waltrop
- 231 Dortmund/Lünen-Brambauer
- 232
  - 2323 Herne
  - 2324 Hattingen
  - 2325 Herne-Wanne-Eickel
  - 2327 Bochum-Wattenscheid
- 233
  - 2330 Herdecke
  - 2331 Hagen
  - 2332 Gevelsberg
  - 2333 Ennepetal
  - 2334 Hagen-Hohenlimburg
  - 2335 Wetter
  - 2336 Schwelm
  - 2337 Hagen-Dahl
  - 2338 Breckerfeld
  - 2339 Sprockhövel
- 234 Bochum
- 235
  - 2350 (no longer valid; now 02352)
  - 2351 Lüdenscheid
  - 2352 Altena
  - 2353 Halver
  - 2354 Meinerzhagen
  - 2355 Schalksmühle
  - 2357 Herscheid
  - 2358 Valbert
  - 2359 Kierspe
- 236
  - 2360 Lippramsdorf
  - 2361 Recklinghausen
  - 2362 Dorsten
  - 2363 Datteln
  - 2364 Haltern
  - 2365 Marl
  - 2366 Herten/Rhade
  - 2367 Castrop-Rauxel-Henrichenburg
  - 2368 Oer-Erkenschwick
  - 2369 Dorsten-Wulfen/Dorsten-Lembeck
- 237
  - 2371 Iserlohn
  - 2372 Hemer
  - 2373 Menden/Fröndenberg
  - 2374 Iserlohn-Letmathe
  - 2375 Balve
  - 2377 Wickede
  - 2378 Fröndenberg-Langschede
  - 2379 Menden-Asbeck
- 238
  - 2381 Hamm
  - 2382 Ahlen (Westf.)
  - 2383 Bönen
  - 2384 Welver
  - 2385 Hamm-Rhynern
  - 2387 Walstedde
  - 2388 Hamm-Uentrop
  - 2389 Werne
- 239
  - 2391 Plettenberg
  - 2392 Werdohl/Neuenrade
  - 2393 Allendorf
  - 2394 Neuenrade-Affeln
  - 2395 Rönkhausen

=== 24 – Aachen and surroundings ===
- 240
  - 2401 Baesweiler
  - 2402 Stolberg (Rheinland)
  - 2403 Eschweiler
  - 2404 Alsdorf
  - 2405 Würselen
  - 2406 Herzogenrath
  - 2407 Herzogenrath-Kohlscheid
  - 2408 Aachen-Kornelimünster
  - 2409 Gressenich
- 241 Aachen
- 242
  - 2421 Düren
  - 2422 Kreuzau
  - 2423 Langerwehe
  - 2424 Vettweiß
  - 2425 Embken
  - 2426 Nörvenich
  - 2427 Nideggen
  - 2428 Niederzier
  - 2429 Hürtgenwald
- 243
  - 2431 Erkelenz
  - 2432 Wassenberg
  - 2433 Hückelhoven
  - 2434 Wegberg
  - 2435 Lövenich
  - 2436 Roedgen
- 244
  - 2440 Nettersheim-Tondorf
  - 2441 Kall
  - 2443 Mechernich
  - 2444 Gemünd
  - 2445 Schleiden
  - 2446 Heimbach (Eifel)
  - 2447 Dahlem
  - 2448 Rescheid
  - 2449 Blankenheim
- 245
  - 2451 Geilenkirchen/Übach-Palenberg
  - 2452 Heinsberg
  - 2453 Randerath
  - 2454 Gangelt
  - 2455 Waldfeucht
  - 2456 Selfkant
- 246
  - 2461 Jülich
  - 2462 Linnich
  - 2463 Titz
  - 2464 Aldenhoven
  - 2465 Inden
- 247
  - 2471 Roetgen
  - 2472 Monschau
  - 2473 Simmerath
  - 2474 Schmidt (Nideggen)
- 248
  - 2482 Hellenthal
  - 2484 Eiserfey
  - 2485 Dreiborn
  - 2486 Nettersheim
- 249

=== 25 – Münster and surroundings ===
- 250
  - 2501 Münster-Hiltrup, Münster-Amelsbüren
  - 2502 Nottuln
  - 2504 Telgte
  - 2505 Altenberge (Westf.)
  - 2506 Münster-Wolbeck
  - 2507 Havixbeck
  - 2508 Drensteinfurt
  - 2509 Nottuln-Appelhülsen
- 251 Münster
- 252
  - 2520 Wadersloh-Diestedde
  - 2521 Beckum
  - 2522 Oelde
  - 2523 Wadersloh
  - 2524 Ennigerloh
  - 2525 Neubeckum
  - 2526 Sendenhorst
  - 2527 Lippetal
  - 2528 Enniger
  - 2529 Stromberg, Oelde
- 253
  - 2532 Ostbevern
  - 2533 Münster-Nienberge
  - 2534 Münster-Roxel
  - 2535 Albersloh
  - 2536 Münster-Albachten
  - 2538 Drensteinfurt-Rinkerode
- 254
  - 2541 Coesfeld
  - 2542 Gescher
  - 2543 Billerbeck
  - 2545 Rosendahl
  - 2546 Lette, Coesfeld
  - 2547 Osterwick
  - 2548 Rorup
- 255
  - 2551 Steinfurt-Burgsteinfurt
  - 2552 Steinfurt-Borghorst
  - 2553 Ochtrup
  - 2554 Laer (ST)
  - 2555 Schöppingen
  - 2556 Metelen
  - 2557 Wettringen (ST)
  - 2558 Horstmar
- 256
  - 2561 Ahaus
  - 2562 Gronau (Westf.)
  - 2563 Stadtlohn
  - 2564 Vreden
  - 2565 Epe
  - 2566 Legden
  - 2567 Ahaus-Alstätte
  - 2568 Heek
- 257
  - 2571 Greven
  - 2572 Emsdetten
  - 2573 Nordwalde
  - 2574 Saerbeck
  - 2575 Reckenfeld
- 258
  - 2581 Warendorf
  - 2582 Everswinkel
  - 2583 Sassenberg
  - 2584 Milte
  - 2585 Hoetmar
  - 2586 Beelen
  - 2587 Westkirchen (Westf)
  - 2588 Greffen
- 259
  - 2590 Dülmen-Buldern
  - 2591 Lüdinghausen
  - 2592 Selm
  - 2593 Ascheberg
  - 2594 Dülmen
  - 2595 Olfen
  - 2596 Nordkirchen
  - 2597 Senden
  - 2598 Ottmarsbocholt
  - 2599 Herbern

=== 26 – Koblenz and surroundings ===
- 260
  - 2601 Nauort
  - 2602 Montabaur
  - 2603 Bad Ems
  - 2604 Nassau (Lahn)
  - 2605 Löf
  - 2606 Winningen
  - 2607 Kobern-Gondorf
  - 2608 Welschneudorf
- 261 Koblenz
- 262
  - 2620 Neuhäusel (WW)
  - 2621 Lahnstein
  - 2622 Bendorf
  - 2623 Ransbach-Baumbach
  - 2624 Höhr-Grenzhausen
  - 2625 Ochtendung
  - 2626 Selters (Westerwald)
  - 2627 Braubach
  - 2628 Rhens
- 263
  - 2630 Mülheim-Kärlich
  - 2631 Neuwied
  - 2632 Andernach
  - 2633 Brohl-Lützing
  - 2634 Rengsdorf
  - 2635 Rheinbrohl
  - 2636 Burgbrohl
  - 2637 Weissenthurm
  - 2638 Waldbreitbach
  - 2639 Anhausen (Neuwied)
- 264
  - 2641 Bad Neuenahr-Ahrweiler
  - 2642 Remagen
  - 2643 Altenahr
  - 2644 Linz am Rhein
  - 2645 Vettelschoss
  - 2646 Königsfeld (Eifel)
  - 2647 Kesseling
- 265
  - 2651 Mayen
  - 2652 Mendig
  - 2653 Kaisersesch
  - 2654 Polch
  - 2655 Weibern
  - 2656 Virneburg
  - 2657 Uersfeld
- 266
  - 2661 Bad Marienberg (WW)
  - 2662 Hachenburg
  - 2663 Westerburg
  - 2664 Rennerod
  - 2666 Freilingen (WW)
  - 2667 Stein-Neukirch
- 267
  - 2671 Cochem
  - 2672 Treis-Karden
  - 2673 Ellenz-Poltersdorf
  - 2674 Bad Bertrich
  - 2675 Ediger-Eller
  - 2676 Ulmen
  - 2677 Lutzerath
  - 2678 Büchel (COC)
- 268
  - 2680 Mündersbach
  - 2681 Altenkirchen (Westerwald)
  - 2682 Hamm (Sieg)
  - 2683 Asbach (Westerwald)
  - 2684 Puderbach (WW)
  - 2685 Flammersfeld
  - 2686 Weyerbusch
  - 2687 Horhausen (Westerwald)
  - 2688 Kroppach
  - 2689 Dierdorf
- 269
  - 2691 Adenau
  - 2692 Kelberg
  - 2693 Antweiler
  - 2694 Wershofen
  - 2695 Insul
  - 2696 Nohn (Eifel)
  - 2697 Ahrhütte (Blankenheim)

=== 27 – Siegen and surroundings ===
- 271 Siegen
- 272
  - 2721 Lennestadt
  - 2722 Attendorn
  - 2723 Kirchhundem
  - 2724 Serkenrode
  - 2725 Oedingen
- 273
  - 2732 Kreuztal
  - 2733 Hilchenbach
  - 2734 Freudenberg
  - 2735 Neunkirchen
  - 2736 Burbach
  - 2737 Netphen-Deuz
  - 2738 Netphen
  - 2739 Wilnsdorf
- 274
  - 2741 Betzdorf
  - 2742 Wissen
  - 2743 Daaden
  - 2744 Herdorf
  - 2745 Brachbach
  - 2747 Molzhain
- 275
  - 2750 Diedenshausen
  - 2751 Bad Berleburg
  - 2752 Bad Laasphe
  - 2753 Erndtebrück
  - 2754 Feudingen
  - 2755 Schwarzenau
  - 2758 Girkhausen
  - 2759 Aue (Bad Berleburg)
- 276
  - 2761 Olpe
  - 2762 Wenden
  - 2763 Bleche
  - 2764 Welschen Ennest
- 277
  - 2770 Eschenburg
  - 2771 Dillenburg
  - 2772 Herborn
  - 2773 Haiger
  - 2774 Dietzhölztal
  - 2775 Driedorf
  - 2776 Bad Endbach-Hartenrod
  - 2777 Breitscheid (Hesse)
  - 2778 Siegbach
  - 2779 Greifenstein-Beilstein

=== 28 – Wesel and surroundings ===
- 280
  - 2801 Xanten
  - 2802 Alpen
  - 2803 Büderich (Wesel)
  - 2804 Marienbaum
- 281 Wesel
- 282
  - 2821 Kleve
  - 2822 Emmerich am Rhein
  - 2823 Goch
  - 2824 Kalkar
  - 2825 Uedem
  - 2826 Kranenburg
  - 2827 Goch-Hassum
  - 2828 Elten (zu Emmerich am Rhein)
- 283
  - 2831 Geldern
  - 2832 Kevelaer
  - 2833 Kerken
  - 2834 Straelen
  - 2835 Issum
  - 2836 Wachtendonk
  - 2837 Weeze
  - 2838 Sonsbeck
  - 2839 Straelen-Herongen
- 284
  - 2841 Moers
  - 2842 Kamp-Lintfort
  - 2843 Rheinberg
  - 2844 Orsoy
  - 2845 Neukirchen-Vluyn
- 285
  - 2850 Haldern
  - 2851 Rees
  - 2852 Hamminkeln
  - 2853 Schermbeck
  - 2855 Voerde (Rheinland)
  - 2856 Brünen
  - 2857 Rees-Mehr
  - 2858 Hünxe
  - 2859 Bislich
- 286
  - 2861 Borken
  - 2862 Südlohn
  - 2863 Velen
  - 2864 Reken
  - 2865 Raesfeld
  - 2866 Dorsten
  - 2867 Heiden (BOR)
- 287
  - 2871 Bocholt
  - 2872 Rhede (Westf)
  - 2873 Werth
  - 2874 Isselburg/Bocholt – Suderwick

=== 29 – Sauerland (Meschede and surroundings) ===
- 290
  - 2902 Warstein
  - 2903 Freienohl
  - 2904 Bestwig
  - 2905 Ramsbeck
- 291 Meschede
- 292
  - 2921 Soest
  - 2922 Werl
  - 2923 Herzfeld (Lippetal)
  - 2924 Möhnesee
  - 2925 Allagen
  - 2927 Bad Sassendorf
  - 2928 Ostönnen
- 293
  - 2931 Arnsberg
  - 2932 Neheim-Hüsten
  - 2933 Sundern
  - 2934 Sundern-Altenhellefeld
  - 2935 Sundern-Hachen
  - 2937 Arnsberg-Oeventrop
  - 2938 Ense
- 294
  - 2941 Lippstadt
  - 2942 Geseke
  - 2943 Erwitte
  - 2944 Rietberg-Mastholte
  - 2945 Lippstadt-Benninghausen
  - 2947 Anröchte
  - 2948 Lippstadt-Rebbeke
- 295
  - 2951 Büren
  - 2952 Rüthen
  - 2953 Bad Wünnenberg
  - 2954 Rüthen-Oestereiden
  - 2955 Wewelsburg
  - 2957 Bad Wünnenberg-Haaren
  - 2958 Büren-Harth
- 296
  - 2961 Brilon
  - 2962 Olsberg
  - 2963 Messinghausen
  - 2964 Alme (Brilon)
- 297
  - 2970 disused
  - 2971 Schmallenberg-Dorlar
  - 2972 Schmallenberg
  - 2973 Eslohe (Sauerland)
  - 2974 Schmallenberg-Bad Fredeburg
  - 2975 Schmallenberg-Oberkirchen
  - 2977 Schmallenberg-Bödefeld
  - 2978 disused
  - 2979 disused
- 298
  - 2981 Winterberg (Sauerld.)
  - 2982 Medebach
  - 2983 Winterberg-Siedlinghausen
  - 2984 Hallenberg
  - 2985 Winterberg-Niedersfeld
- 299
  - 2991 Marsberg-Bredelar
  - 2992 Marsberg
  - 2993 Marsberg-Canstein
  - 2994 Marsberg-Westheim

== 3 ==
All of former East Germany and Berlin

East Germany was using +37 before the reunification. After reunification, East Germany was merged into the existing (West) German numbering plan. Since all areas except 03 were already used, all of former East Germany needed to be merged into 03, causing numbers and area codes in the 03 area to be longer than those in the rest of Germany: Many area codes in the 03 area are 5-digit while the maximum in the rest of Germany is 4 digits

=== 30 – Berlin ===
- 30 Berlin

=== 31 – Test numbers for carrier selection ===
- 310 test number (long-distance)
- 311 test number (local)

=== 32 – Non-geographic numbers ===
- 32 non-geographic national subscriber numbers for VoIP, etc. (Nationale Teilnehmerrufnummern (NTR) [in German])

=== 33 – Brandenburg ===
==== 330 – Oranienburg and surroundings ====
  - 3301 Oranienburg
  - 3302 Hennigsdorf
  - 3303 Birkenwerder
  - 3304 Velten
  - 3305
    - 33051 Nassenheide
    - 33053 Zehlendorf
    - 33054 Liebenwalde
    - 33055 Kremmen
    - 33056 Mühlenbeck
  - 3306 Gransee
  - 3307 Zehdenick
  - 3308
    - 33080 Marienthal
    - 33082 Menz
    - 33083 Schulzendorf
    - 33084 Gutengermendorf
    - 33085 Seilershof
    - 33086 Grieben
    - 33087 Bredereiche
    - 33088 Falkenthal
    - 33089 Himmelpfort
  - 3309
    - 33093 Fürstenberg/Havel
    - 33094 Löwenberger Land

==== 331/0332 – Potsdam and surroundings ====
- 331 Potsdam
- 332
  - 3320
    - 33200 Bergholz-Rehbrücke
    - 33201 Groß Glienicke
    - 33202 Töplitz
    - 33203 Kleinmachnow
    - 33204 Beelitz
    - 33205 Michendorf
    - 33206 Fichtenwalde
    - 33207 Groß Kreutz
    - 33208 Fahrland
    - 33209 Caputh
  - 3321 Nauen
  - 3322 Falkensee
  - 3323
    - 33230 Börnicke
    - 33231 Pausin
    - 33232 Brieselang
    - 33233 Ketzin
    - 33234 Wustermark
    - 33235 Friesack
    - 33237 Paulinenaue
    - 33238 Senzke
    - 33239 Groß Behnitz
  - 3327 Werder (Havel)
  - 3328 Teltow
  - 3329 Stahnsdorf

==== 333 – Angermünde and surroundings ====
  - 3331 Angermünde
  - 3332 Schwedt
  - 3333
    - 33331 Casekow
    - 33332 Gartz (Oder)
    - 33333 Tantow
    - 33334 Greiffenberg
    - 33335 Pinnow
    - 33336 Passow
    - 33337 Altkünkendorf
    - 33338 Stolpe/Oder
  - 3334 Eberswalde
  - 3335 Finowfurt
  - 3336
    - 33361 Joachimsthal
    - 33362 Liepe
    - 33363 Altenhof
    - 33364 Groß Ziethen
    - 33365 Lüdersdorf
    - 33366 Chorin
    - 33367 Friedrichswalde
    - 33368 Hohensaaten
    - 33369 Oderberg
  - 3337 Biesenthal
  - 3338 Bernau
  - 3339
    - 33393 Groß Schönebeck
    - 33394 Blumberg
    - 33395 Zerpenschleuse
    - 33396 Klosterfelde
    - 33397 Wandlitz
    - 33398 Werneuchen

==== 334 – Strausberg and surroundings ====
  - 3341 Strausberg
  - 3342 Neuenhagen
  - 3343
    - 33432 Müncheberg
    - 33433 Buckow
    - 33434 Herzfelde bei Strausberg
    - 33435 Rehfelde
    - 33436 Prötzel
    - 33437 Reichenberg bei Strausberg
    - 33438 Altlandsberg
    - 33439 Fredersdorf-Vogelsdorf
  - 3344 Bad Freienwalde
  - 3345
    - 33451 Heckelberg
    - 33452 Neulewin
    - 33454 Wölsickendorf/Wollenber
    - 33456 Wriezen
    - 33457 Altreetz
    - 33458 Falkenberg (Mark)
  - 3346 Seelow
  - 3347 --
    - 33470 Lietzen
    - 33472 Golzow bei Seelow
    - 33473 Zechin
    - 33474 Neutrebbin
    - 33475 Letschin
    - 33476 Neuhardenberg
    - 33477 Trebnitz bei Müncheberg
    - 33478 Groß Neuendorf
    - 33479 Küstrin-Kietz

==== 335/0336 – Frankfurt (Oder) and surroundings ====
- 335 Frankfurt (Oder)
- 336
  - 3360
    - 33601 Podelzig
    - 33602 Alt Zeschdorf
    - 33603 Falkenhagen (Mark)
    - 33604 Lebus
    - 33605 Boossen
    - 33606 Müllrose
    - 33607 Briesen (Mark)
    - 33608 Jacobsdorf
    - 33609 Brieskow-Finkenheerd
  - 3361 Fürstenwalde/Spree
  - 3362 Erkner
  - 3363
    - 33631 Bad Saarow
    - 33632 Hangelsberg
    - 33633 Spreenhagen
    - 33634 Berkenbrück
    - 33635 Arensdorf
    - 33636 Steinhöfel
    - 33637 Beerfelde
    - 33638 Rüdersdorf bei Berlin
  - 3364 Eisenhüttenstadt
  - 3365
    - 33652 Neuzelle
    - 33653 Ziltendorf
    - 33654 Fünfeichen
    - 33655 Grunow
    - 33656 Bahro
    - 33657 Steinsdorf
  - 3366 Beeskow
  - 3367
    - 33671 Lieberose
    - 33672 Pfaffendorf bei Beeskow
    - 33673 Weichensdorf
    - 33674 Trebatsch
    - 33675 Tauche
    - 33676 Friedland (Niederlausitz)
    - 33677 Glienicke bei Beeskow
    - 33678 Storkow (Mark)
    - 33679 Wendisch Rietz

==== 337 – Luckenwalde and surroundings ====
  - 3370
    - 33701 Großbeeren
    - 33702 Wünsdorf
    - 33703 Am Mellensee
    - 33704 Baruth/Mark
    - 33708 Rangsdorf
  - 3371 Luckenwalde
  - 3372 Jüterbog
  - 3373
    - 33731 Trebbin
    - 33732 Hennickendorf
    - 33733 Stülpe
    - 33734 Felgentreu
  - 3374
    - 33741 Niedergörsdorf
    - 33742 Oehna
    - 33743 Blönsdorf
    - 33744 Hohenseefeld
    - 33745 Petkus
    - 33746 Werbig bei Jüterbog
    - 33747 Marzahna
    - 33748 Treuenbrietzen
  - 3375 Königs Wusterhausen
  - 3376
    - 33760 Münchehofe
    - 33762 Zeuthen
    - 33763 Bestensee
    - 33764 Mittenwalde (Mark)
    - 33765 Märkisch Buchholz
    - 33766 Teupitz
    - 33767 Friedersdorf bei Berlin
    - 33768 Prieros
    - 33769 Töpchin
  - 3377 Zossen
  - 3378 Ludwigsfelde
  - 3379 Mahlow

==== 338 – Brandenburg an der Havel and surroundings ====
  - 3381 Brandenburg an der Havel
  - 3382 Lehnin
  - 3383
    - 33830 Ziesar
    - 33831 Weseram
    - 33832 Rogäsen
    - 33833 Wollin
    - 33834 Pritzerbe
    - 33835 Golzow
    - 33836 Butzow
    - 33837 Brielow
    - 33838 Päwesin
    - 33839 Wusterwitz
  - 3384
    - 33841 Belzig
    - 33843 Niemegk
    - 33844 Brück
    - 33845 Borkheide
    - 33846 Dippmannsdorf
    - 33847 Görzke
    - 33848 Raben
    - 33849 Wiesenburg/Mark
  - 3385 Rathenow
  - 3386 Premnitz
  - 3387
    - 33870 Zollchow bei Rathenow
    - 33872 Hohennauen
    - 33873 Großwudicke
    - 33874 Stechow
    - 33875 Rhinow
    - 33876 Buschow
    - 33877 Nitzahn
    - 33878 Nennhausen

==== 339 – Neuruppin and surroundings ====
  - 3391 Neuruppin
  - 3392
    - 33920 Walsleben bei Neuruppin
    - 33921 Zechlinerhütte
    - 33922 Karwesee
    - 33923 Flecken Zechlin
    - 33924 Rägelin
    - 33925 Wustrau-Altfriesack
    - 33926 Herzberg (Mark)
    - 33928 Wildberg
    - 33929 Gühlen-Glienicke
  - 3393
    - 33931 Rheinsberg
    - 33932 Fehrbellin
    - 33933 Lindow (Mark)
  - 3394 Wittstock/Dosse
  - 3395 Pritzwalk
  - 3396
    - 33962 Heiligengrabe
    - 33963 Wulfersdorf bei Wittstock
    - 33964 Fretzdorf
    - 33965 Herzsprung bei Wittstock
    - 33966 Dranse
    - 33967 Freyenstein
    - 33968 Meyenburg
    - 33969 Stepenitz
  - 3397
    - 33970 Neustadt (Dosse)
    - 33971 Kyritz
    - 33972 Breddin
    - 33973 Zernitz bei Neustadt
    - 33974 Dessow
    - 33975 Dannenwalde
    - 33976 Wutike
    - 33977 Gumtow
    - 33978 Segeletz
    - 33979 Wusterhausen/Dosse
  - 3398
    - 33981 Putlitz
    - 33982 Hoppenrade
    - 33983 Groß Pankow
    - 33984 Blumenthal bei Pritzwalk
    - 33986 Falkenhagen
    - 33989 Sadenbeck

=== 34 – Leipzig and surroundings ===
- 340 Dessau
- 341 Leipzig
- 342
  - 3420
    - 34202 Delitzsch
    - 34203 Zwenkau
    - 34204 Schkeuditz
    - 34205 Markranstädt
    - 34206 Rötha
    - 34207 Zwochau
    - 34208 Löbnitz
  - 3421 Torgau
  - 3422
    - 34221 Schildau
    - 34222 Arzberg
    - 34223 Dommitzsch
    - 34224 Belgern
  - 3423 Eilenburg
  - 3424
    - 34241 Jesewitz
    - 34242 Hohenprießnitz
    - 34243 Bad Düben
    - 34244 Mockrehna
  - 3425 Wurzen
  - 3426
    - 34261 Kühren bei Wurzen
    - 34262 Falkenhain
    - 34263 Großzschepa
  - 3429
    - 34291 Borsdorf
    - 34292 Brandis
    - 34293 Naunhof
    - 34294 Rackwitz
    - 34295 Krensitz
    - 34296 Groitzsch
    - 34297 Liebertwolkwitz
    - 34298 Taucha
    - 34299 Gaschwitz
- 343
  - 3431 Döbeln
  - 3432
    - 34321 Leisnig
    - 34322 Roßwein
    - 34324 Ostrau, Landkreis Mittelsachsen
    - 34325 Lüttewitz Ortsteil von Zschaitz-Ottewig
    - 34327 Waldheim
    - 34328 Hartha
  - 3433 Borna
  - 3434
    - 34341 Geithain
    - 34342 Neukieritzsch
    - 34343 Regis-Breitingen
    - 34344 Kohren-Sahlis
    - 34345 Bad Lausick
    - 34346 Narsdorf
    - 34347 Oelzschau
    - 34348 Frohburg
  - 3435 Oschatz
  - 3436
    - 34361 Dahlen (Sachsen)
    - 34362 Mügeln
    - 34363 Cavertitz
    - 34364 Wermsdorf
  - 3437 Grimma
  - 3438
    - 34381 Colditz
    - 34382 Nerchau
    - 34383 Trebsen
    - 34384 Großbothen
    - 34385 Mutzschen
    - 34386 Dürrweitzschen
- 344
  - 3441 Zeitz
  - 3443 Weißenfels
  - 3445 Naumburg
  - 34463 Prießnitz
  - 3447 Altenburg
  - 3448 Meuselwitz
  - 3449
    - 34491 Schmölln
    - 34492 Lucka
    - 34493 Gößnitz
    - 34494 Ehrenhain
    - 34495 Dobitschen
    - 34496 Nöbdenitz
    - 34497 Langenleuba-Niederhain
    - 34498 Rositz
- 345 Halle (Saale)
- 346
  - 3460
    - 34600 Ostrau (Petersberg)
    - 34601 Teutschenthal
    - 34602 Landsberg
    - 34603 Nauendorf
    - 34604 Niemberg
    - 34605 Kabelsketal-Gröbers
    - 34606 Teicha
    - 34607 Wettin
    - 34609 Salzmünde
  - 3461 Merseburg
  - 3462 Bad Dürrenberg
  - 3463
    - 34632 Mücheln (Geiseltal)
    - 34633 Braunsbedra
    - 34635 Bad Lauchstädt
    - 34636 Schafstädt
    - 34637 Frankleben
    - 34638 Zöschen
    - 34639 Wallendorf (Luppe)
  - 3464 Sangerhausen
  - 3465
    - 34651 Rossla
    - 34652 Allstedt
    - 34653 Rottleberode
    - 34654 Stolberg (Harz)
    - 34656 Wallhausen, Saxony-Anhalt
    - 34658 Hayn
    - 34659 Blankenheim bei Sangerhausen
  - 3466 Artern
  - 3467
    - 34671 Bad Frankenhausen/Kyffhäuser
    - 34672 Roßleben
    - 34673 Heldrungen
  - 3469
    - 34691 Könnern
    - 34692 Alsleben (Saale)
- 347
  - 3471 Bernburg
  - 3472
    - 34721 Nienburg
    - 34722 Preußlitz
  - 3473 Aschersleben
  - 3474
    - 34741 Frose
    - 34742 Sylda
    - 34743 Ermsleben
    - 34745 Winningen
    - 34746 Giersleben
  - 3475 Lutherstadt Eisleben
  - 3476 Hettstedt
  - 3477
    - 34771 Querfurt
    - 34772 Helbra
    - 34773 Schwittersdorf
    - 34774 Röblingen am See
    - 34775 Wippra
    - 34776 Rothenschirmbach
    - 34779 Abberode
  - 3478
    - 34781 Greifenhagen
    - 34782 Mansfeld-Südharz
    - 34783 Gerbstedt
    - 34785 Sandersleben
- 349
  - 3490
    - 34901 Rosslau
    - 34903 Coswig (Anhalt)
    - 34904 Oranienbaum
    - 34905 Wörlitz
    - 34906 Raguhn
    - 34907 Jeber-Bergfrieden
    - 34909 Aken
  - 3491 Lutherstadt Wittenberg
  - 3492
    - 34920 Kropstädt
    - 34921 Kemberg
    - 34922 Mühlanger
    - 34923 Cobbelsdorf
    - 34924 Zahna
    - 34925 Bad Schmiedeberg
    - 34926 Pretzsch (Elbe)
    - 34927 Globig
    - 34928 Seegrehna
    - 34929 Straach
  - 3493 Bitterfeld
  - 3494 Wolfen
  - 3495
    - 34953 Gräfenhainichen
    - 34954 Roitzsch
    - 34955 Gossa
    - 34956 Zörbig
  - 3496 Köthen (Anhalt)
  - 3497
    - 34973 Osternienburg
    - 34975 Görzig
    - 34976 Gröbzig
    - 34977 Quellendorf
    - 34978 Radegast
    - 34979 Wulfen

=== 35 – Dresden ===
==== 350 – Pirna and surroundings ====
  - 3501 Pirna
  - 3502
    - 35020 Struppen
    - 35021 Königstein
    - 35022 Bad Schandau
    - 35023 Bad Gottleuba
    - 35024 Stadt Wehlen
    - 35025 Liebstadt
    - 35026 Dürrröhrsdorf
    - 35027 Weesenstein
    - 35028 Krippen
  - 3503
    - 35032 Langenhennersdorf
    - 35033 Rosenthal
  - 3504 Dippoldiswalde
  - 3505
    - 35052 Kipsdorf
    - 35053 Glashütte
    - 35054 Lauenstein
    - 35055 Höckendorf
    - 35056 Altenberg
    - 35057 Hermsdorf
    - 35058 Pretzschendorf

==== 351 – Dresden ====
  - 351 Dresden

==== 352 – Meißen and surroundings ====
  - 3520
    - 35200 Arnsdorf
    - 35201 Langebrück
    - 35202 Klingenberg
    - 35203 Tharandt
    - 35204 Wilsdruff
    - 35205 Ottendorf-Okrilla
    - 35206 Kreischa
    - 35207 Moritzburg
    - 35208 Radeburg
    - 35209 Mohorn
  - 3521 Meißen
  - 3522 Großenhain
  - 3523 Coswig
  - 3524
    - 35240 Tauscha
    - 35241 Lommatzsch
    - 35242 Nossen
    - 35243 Weinböhla
    - 35244 Krögis
    - 35245 Burkhardswalde
    - 35246 Ziegenhain
    - 35247 Zehren
    - 35248 Schönfeld
    - 35249 Basslitz
  - 3525 Riesa
  - 3526
    - 35263 Gröditz
    - 35264 Strehla
    - 35265 Glaubitz
    - 35266 Heyda
    - 35267 Diesbar-Seußlitz
    - 35268 Stauchitz
  - 3528 Radeberg
  - 3529 Heidenau

==== 353 – Finsterwalde and surroundings ====
  - 3531 Finsterwalde
  - 3532
    - 35322 Doberlug-Kirchhain
    - 35323 Sonnewalde
    - 35324 Crinitz
    - 35325 Rückersdorf
    - 35326 Schönborn
    - 35327 Prießen
    - 35329 Dollenchen
  - 3533 Elsterwerda
  - 3534
    - 35341 Bad Liebenwerda
    - 35342 Mühlberg (Elbe)
    - 35343 Hirschfeld
  - 3535 Herzberg (Elster)
  - 3536
    - 35361 Schlieben
    - 35362 Schönewalde
    - 35363 Fermerswalde
    - 35364 Lebusa
    - 35365 Falkenberg (Elster)
  - 3537 Jessen (Elster)
  - 3538
    - 35383 Elster (Elbe)
    - 35384 Steinsdorf
    - 35385 Annaburg
    - 35386 Prettin
    - 35387 Seyda
    - 35388 Klöden
    - 35389 Holzdorf

==== 354 – Calau and surroundings ====
  - 3541 Calau
  - 3542 Lübbenau
  - 3543
    - 35433 Vetschau/Spreewald
    - 35434 Altdöbern
    - 35435 Gollmitz
    - 35436 Laasow
    - 35439 Zinnitz
  - 3544 Luckau
  - 3545
    - 35451 Dahme
    - 35452 Golßen
    - 35453 Drahnsdorf
    - 35454 Uckro
    - 35455 Walddrehna
    - 35456 Terpt
  - 3546 Lübben (Spreewald)
  - 3547
    - 35471 Birkenhainchen
    - 35472 Schlepzig
    - 35473 Neu Lübbenau
    - 35474 Schönwald (Brandenburg)
    - 35475 Straupitz
    - 35476 Wittmannsdorf
    - 35477 Rietz Neuendorf
    - 35478 Goyatz

==== 355/0356 – Cottbus and surroundings ====
- 355 Cottbus
  - 3560
    - 35600 Döbern
    - 35601 Peitz
    - 35602 Drebkau
    - 35603 Burg (Spreewald)
    - 35604 Krieschow
    - 35605 Komptendorf
    - 35606 Briesen
    - 35607 Jänschwalde
    - 35608 Groß Oßnig
    - 35609 Drachhausen
  - 3561 Guben
  - 3562 Forst (Lausitz)
  - 3563 Spremberg
  - 3564 Schwarze Pumpe
  - 3569
    - 35691 Bärenklau
    - 35692 Kerkwitz
    - 35693 Lauschütz
    - 35694 Gosda
    - 35695 Simmersdorf
    - 35696 Briesnig
    - 35697 Bagenz
    - 35698 Hornow

==== 357 – Hoyerswerda and surroundings ====
  - 3571 Hoyerswerda
  - 3572
    - 35722 Lauta
    - 35723 Bernsdorf
    - 35724 Lohsa
    - 35725 Wittichenau
    - 35726 Groß Särchen
    - 35727 Burghammer
    - 35728 Uhyst
  - 3573 Senftenberg
  - 3574 Lauchhammer
  - 3575
    - 35751 Welzow
    - 35752 Ruhland
    - 35753 Großräschen
    - 35754 Klettwitz
    - 35755 Ortrand
    - 35756 Hosena
  - 3576 Weißwasser
  - 3577
    - 35771 Bad Muskau
    - 35772 Rietschen
    - 35773 Schleife (Sachsen)
    - 35774 Boxberg (Oberlausitz)
    - 35775 Pechern
  - 3578 Kamenz
  - 3579
    - 35792 Oßling
    - 35793 Elstra
    - 35795 Königsbrück
    - 35796 Panschwitz-Kuckau
    - 35797 Schwepnitz

==== 358 – Görlitz and surroundings ====
  - 3581 Görlitz
  - 3582
    - 35820 Zodel
    - 35822 Hagenwerder
    - 35823 Ostritz
    - 35825 Kodersdorf
    - 35826 Königshain
    - 35827 Nieder Seifersdorf
    - 35828 Reichenbach (Oberlausitz)
    - 35829 Gersdorf, Saxony
  - 3583 Zittau
  - 3584
    - 35841 Großschönau
    - 35842 Niederoderwitz
    - 35843 Hirschfelde
    - 35844 Oybin
  - 3585 Löbau
  - 3586 Ebersbach/Sa., Neugersdorf
  - 3587
    - 35872 Neusalza-Spremberg
    - 35873 Herrnhut
    - 35874 Bernstadt a. d. Eigen
    - 35875 Obercunnersdorf
    - 35876 Weißenberg
    - 35877 Cunewalde
  - 3588 Niesky
  - 3589
    - 35891 Rothenburg (Oberlausitz)
    - 35892 Horka
    - 35893 Mücka
    - 35894 Hähnichen
    - 35895 Klitten

==== 359 – Bautzen and surroundings ====
  - 3591 Bautzen
  - 3592 Kirschau
  - 3593
    - 35930 Seitschen
    - 35931 Königswartha
    - 35932 Guttau
    - 35933 Neschwitz
    - 35934 Großdubrau
    - 35935 Kleinwelka
    - 35936 Sohland an der Spree
    - 35937 Prischwitz
    - 35938 Großpostwitz
    - 35939 Hochkirch
  - 3594 Bischofswerda
  - 3595
    - 35951 Neukirch/Lausitz
    - 35952 Großröhrsdorf
    - 35953 Burkau
    - 35954 Grossharthau
    - 35955 Pulsnitz
  - 3596 Neustadt in Sachsen
  - 3597
    - 35971 Sebnitz
    - 35973 Stolpen
    - 35974 Hinterhermsdorf
    - 35975 Hohnstein

=== 36 – Thüringen ===
==== 360 – Mühlhausen/Thür. and surroundings ====
  - 3601 Mühlhausen/Thür.
  - 3602
    - 36020 Ebeleben
    - 36021 Schlotheim
    - 36022 Großengottern
    - 36023 Horsmar
    - 36024 Diedorf
    - 36025 Körner
    - 36026 Rodeberg (Struth)
    - 36027 Lengenfeld unterm Stein
    - 36028 Kammerforst
    - 36029 Menteroda
  - 3603 Bad Langensalza
  - 3604
    - 36041 Bad Tennstedt
    - 36042 Gräfentonna
    - 36043 Kirchheilingen
  - 3605 Leinefelde
  - 3606 Heilbad Heiligenstadt
  - 3607
    - 36071 Teistungen
    - 36072 Weißenborn-Lüderode
    - 36074 Worbis
    - 36075 Dingelstädt
    - 36076 Niederorschel
    - 36077 Großbodungen
  - 3608
    - 36081 Arenshausen
    - 36082 Ershausen
    - 36083 Uder
    - 36084 Heuthen
    - 36085 Reinholterode
    - 36087 Wüstheuterode

==== 361 – Erfurt ====
  - 361 Erfurt

==== 362 – Gotha and surroundings ====
  - 3620
    - 36200 Elxleben
    - 36201 Walschleben
    - 36202 Neudietendorf
    - 36203 Vieselbach
    - 36204 Stotternheim
    - 36205 Gräfenroda
    - 36206 Großfahner
    - 36207 Plaue
    - 36208 Ermstedt
    - 36209 Klettbach
  - 3621 Gotha
  - 3622 Waltershausen
  - 3623 Friedrichroda
  - 3624 Ohrdruf
  - 3625
    - 36252 Tambach-Dietharz/Thür. Wald
    - 36253 Georgenthal (Thüringen)
    - 36254 Friedrichswerth
    - 36255 Goldbach
    - 36256 Wechmar
    - 36257 Luisenthal
    - 36258 Friemar
    - 36259 Bad Tabarz
  - 3628 Arnstadt
  - 3629 Stadtilm

==== 363 – Nordhausen and surroundings ====
  - 3631 Nordhausen
  - 3632 Sondershausen
  - 3633
    - 36330 Großberndten
    - 36331 Ilfeld
    - 36332 Ellrich
    - 36333 Heringen/Helme
    - 36334 Wolkramshausen
    - 36335 Großwechsungen
    - 36336 Klettenberg
    - 36337 Schiedungen
    - 36338 Bleicherode
  - 3634 Sömmerda
  - 3635 Kölleda
  - 3636 Greußen
  - 3637
    - 36370 Großenehrich
    - 36371 Schloßvippach
    - 36372 Kleinneuhausen
    - 36373 Buttstädt
    - 36374 Weißensee
    - 36375 Kindelbrück
    - 36376 Straußfurt
    - 36377 Rastenberg
    - 36378 Ostramondra
    - 36379 Holzengel

==== 364 – Jena/Weimar and surroundings ====
  - 3641 Jena
  - 3642
    - 36421 Camburg
    - 36422 Reinstädt
    - 36423 Orlamünde
    - 36424 Kahla
    - 36425 Isserstedt
    - 36426 Ottendorf
    - 36427 Dornburg (Saale)
    - 36428 Stadtroda
  - 3643 Weimar
  - 3644 Apolda
  - 3645
    - 36450 Kranichfeld
    - 36451 Buttelstedt
    - 36452 Berlstedt
    - 36453 Mellingen
    - 36454 Magdala
    - 36458 Bad Berka
    - 36459 Blankenhain
  - 3646
    - 36461 Bad Sulza
    - 36462 Oßmannstedt
    - 36463 Gebstedt
    - 36464 Wormstedt
    - 36465 Oberndorf
  - 3647 Pößneck
  - 3648
    - 36481 Neustadt (Orla)
    - 36482 Triptis
    - 36483 Ziegenrück
    - 36484 Knau

==== 365/0366 – Gera and surroundings ====
- 365 Gera
  - 3660
    - 36601 Hermsdorf
    - 36602 Ronneburg
    - 36603 Weida
    - 36604 Münchenbernsdorf
    - 36605 Bad Köstritz
    - 36606 Kraftsdorf
    - 36607 Niederpöllnitz
    - 36608 Seelingstädt
  - 3661 Greiz
  - 3662
    - 36621 Elsterberg
    - 36622 Triebes
    - 36623 Berga/Elster
    - 36624 Teichwolframsdorf
    - 36625 Langenwetzendorf
    - 36626 Auma
    - 36628 Zeulenroda
  - 3663 Schleiz
  - 3664
    - 36640 Remptendorf
    - 36642 Harra
    - 36643 Thimmendorf
    - 36644 Hirschberg (Saale)
    - 36645 Mühltroff
    - 36646 Tanna
    - 36647 Saalburg
    - 36648 Dittersdorf
    - 36649 Gefell
  - 3665
    - 36651 Bad Lobenstein
    - 36652 Wurzbach
    - 36653 Lehesten
  - 3669
    - 36691 Eisenberg (Thüringen)
    - 36692 Bürgel
    - 36693 Crossen
    - 36694 Schkölen

==== 367 – Saalfeld/Saale – Ilmenau – Sonneberg ====
  - 3670
    - 36701 Lichte
    - 36702 Lauscha
    - 36703 Gräfenthal
    - 36704 Steinheid
    - 36705 Oberweißbach
  - 3671 Saalfeld/Saale
  - 3672 Rudolstadt
  - 3673
    - 36730 Sitzendorf
    - 36731 Unterloquitz
    - 36732 Könitz
    - 36733 Kaulsdorf (Saale)
    - 36734 Leutenberg
    - 36735 Probstzella
    - 36736 Arnsgereuth
    - 36737 Drognitz
    - 36738 Königsee
    - 36739 Rottenbach
  - 3674
    - 36741 Bad Blankenburg
    - 36742 Uhlstädt
    - 36743 Teichel
    - 36744 Remda
  - 3675 Sonneberg
  - 3676
    - 36761 Heubisch
    - 36762 Steinach
    - 36764 Neuhaus-Schierschnitz
    - 36766 Schalkau
  - 3677 Ilmenau
  - 3678
    - 36781 Großbreitenbach, Goldisthal and Katzhütte
    - 36782 Schmiedefeld am Rennsteig
    - 36783 Gehren
    - 36784 Stützerbach
    - 36785 Gräfinau-Angstedt
  - 3679 Neuhaus am Rennweg

==== 368 – Suhl and surroundings ====
  - 3681 Suhl
  - 3682 Zella-Mehlis
  - 3683 Schmalkalden
  - 3684
    - 36840 Trusetal
    - 36841 Schleusingen
    - 36842 Oberhof
    - 36843 Benshausen
    - 36844 Rohr (Thüringen)
    - 36845 Gehlberg
    - 36846 Dietzhausen
    - 36847 Steinbach-Hallenberg
    - 36848 Wernshausen
    - 36849 Kleinschmalkalden
  - 3685 Hildburghausen
  - 3686 Eisfeld
  - 3687
    - 36870 Masserberg
    - 36871 Bad Colberg-Heldburg
    - 36873 Themar
    - 36874 Schönbrunn (Thüringen)
    - 36875 Streufdorf
    - 36878 Brattendorf

==== 369 – Eisenach and surroundings ====
  - 3691 Eisenach
  - 3692
    - 36920 Großenlupnitz
    - 36921 Wutha-Farnroda
    - 36922 Gerstungen
    - 36923 Treffurt
    - 36924 Mihla
    - 36925 Marksuhl
    - 36926 Creuzburg
    - 36927 Unterellen
    - 36928 Neuenhof
    - 36929 Ruhla
  - 3693 Meiningen
  - 3694
    - 36940 Oepfershausen
    - 36941 Wasungen
    - 36943 Bettenhausen
    - 36944 Rentwertshausen
    - 36945 Henneberg
    - 36946 Reichenhausen
    - 36947 Jüchsen
    - 36948 Römhild
    - 36949 Obermaßfeld
  - 3695 Bad Salzungen
  - 3696
    - 36961 Bad Liebenstein
    - 36962 Vacha
    - 36963 Dorndorf
    - 36964 Dermbach
    - 36965 Stadtlengsfeld
    - 36966 Kaltennordheim
    - 36967 Geisa
    - 36968 Roßdorf (Rhön)
    - 36969 Merkers

=== 37 – Chemnitz and surroundings ===
==== 371/0372 - Chemnitz and surroundings ====
- 371 Chemnitz
- 372
  - 3720
    - 37200 Wittgensdorf
    - 37202 Claußnitz
    - 37203 Gersdorf
    - 37204 Lichtenstein
    - 37206 Frankenberg
    - 37207 Hainichen
    - 37208 Oberlichtenau
    - 37209 Einsiedel
  - 3721 Meinersdorf
  - 3722 Limbach-Oberfrohna
  - 3723 Hohenstein-Ernstthal
  - 3724 Burgstädt
  - 3725 Zschopau
  - 3726 Flöha
  - 3727 Mittweida
  - 3729
    - 37291 Augustusburg
    - 37292 Oederan
    - 37293 Eppendorf
    - 37294 Grünhainichen
    - 37295 Lugau/Erzgeb.
    - 37296 Stollberg/Erzgeb.
    - 37297 Thum
    - 37298 Oelsnitz (Erzgebirge)

==== 373 - Freiberg and surroundings ====
  - 3731 Freiberg (Sachsen)
  - 3732
    - 37320 Mulda/Sa.
    - 37321 Frankenstein
    - 37322 Brand-Erbisdorf
    - 37323 Lichtenberg
    - 37324 Reinsberg
    - 37325 Niederbobritzsch
    - 37326 Frauenstein
    - 37327 Rechenberg-Bienenmühle
    - 37328 Großschirma
    - 37329 Großhartmannsdorf
  - 3733 Annaberg-Buchholz
  - 3734
    - 37341 Ehrenfriedersdorf
    - 37342 Cranzahl
    - 37343 Jöhstadt
    - 37344 Crottendorf
    - 37346 Geyer
    - 37347 Bärenstein
    - 37348 Oberwiesenthal
    - 37349 Scheibenberg
  - 3735 Marienberg
  - 3736
    - 37360 Olbernhau
    - 37361 Neuhausen/Erzgeb.
    - 37362 Seiffen/Erzgeb.
    - 37363 Zöblitz
    - 37364 Reitzenhain
    - 37365 Sayda
    - 37366 Rübenau
    - 37367 Lengefeld
    - 37368 Deutschneudorf
    - 37369 Wolkenstein
  - 3737 Rochlitz
  - 3738
    - 37381 Penig
    - 37382 Geringswalde
    - 37383 Lunzenau
    - 37384 Wechselburg

==== 374 - Plauen and surroundings ====
  - 3741 Plauen
  - 3742
    - 37421 Oelsnitz (Vogtland)
    - 37422 Markneukirchen
    - 37423 Adorf (Vogtland)
  - 3743
    - 37430 Eichigt
    - 37431 Mehltheuer (Vogtl.)
    - 37432 Pausa/Vogtl.
    - 37433 Gutenfürst
    - 37434 Bobenneukirchen
    - 37435 Reuth
    - 37436 Weischlitz
    - 37437 Bad Elster
    - 37438 Bad Brambach
    - 37439 Jocketa
  - 3744 Auerbach/Vogtl.
  - 3745 Falkenstein
  - 3746
    - 37462 Rothenkirchen (Vogtland)
    - 37463 Bergen, Vogtlandkreis
    - 37464 Schöneck/Vogtl.
    - 37465 Tannenbergsthal
    - 37467 Klingenthal
    - 37468 Treuen

==== 375/0376 - Zwickau and surroundings ====
- 375 Zwickau
- 376
  - 3760
    - 37600 Neumark (Sachsen)
    - 37601 Mülsen St. Jacob
    - 37602 Kirchberg (Sachsen)
    - 37603 Wildenfels
    - 37604 Mosel (Sachsen)
    - 37605 Hartenstein
    - 37606 Lengenfeld (Vogtland)
    - 37607 Ebersbrunn
    - 37608 Waldenburg
    - 37609 Wolkenburg
  - 3761 Werdau (Sachsen)
  - 3762 Crimmitschau
  - 3763 Glauchau
  - 3764 Meerane
  - 3765 Reichenbach im Vogtland

==== 377 - Aue and surroundings ====
  - 3771 Aue (Sachsen)
  - 3772 Schneeberg (Erzgebirge)
  - 3773 Johanngeorgenstadt
  - 3774 Schwarzenberg/Erzgeb.
  - 3775
    - 37752 Eibenstock
    - 37754 Zwönitz
    - 37755 Schönheide (Erzgebirge)
    - 37756 Breitenbrunn
    - 37757 Rittersgrün

=== 38 – Rostock and surroundings ===
==== 381/0382 – Rostock and surroundings ====
- 381 Rostock
  - 3820
    - 38201 Gelbensande
    - 38203 Bad Doberan
    - 38204 Broderstorf
    - 38205 Tessin
    - 38206 Graal-Müritz
    - 38207 Kritzmow
    - 38208 Dummerstorf
    - 38209 Sanitz
  - 3821 Ribnitz-Damgarten, Ahrenshagen-Daskow
  - 3822
    - 38220 Ahrenshoop, Wustrow
    - 38221 Marlow
    - 38222 Ahrenshagen-Daskow-Gruel, -Tribohm, Semlow
    - 38223 Ribnitz-Damgarten-Beiershagen, -Dechowshof, -Langendamm, Saal
    - 38224 Marlow-div. Ortsteile
    - 38225 Ahrenshagen-Daskow-Prusdorf, -Todenhagen, Schlemmin, Trinwillershagen
    - 38226 Dierhagen
    - 38227 Bartelshagen II, Spoldershagen, Lüdershagen, Saal-Hessenburg
  - 3823
    - 38231 Barth, Divitz, Fuhlendorf, Kenz-Küstrow, Löbnitz-Saatel, Pruchten, Groß Kordshagen
    - 38232 Seeheilbad Zingst
    - 38233 Prerow, Wieck
    - 38234 Born
  - 3829
    - 38292 Kröpelin
    - 38293 Kühlungsborn
    - 38294 Neubukow
    - 38295 Satow

==== 383 – Stralsund/Greifswald and surroundings ====
  - 3830
    - 38300 Hiddensee
    - 38301 Putbus
    - 38302 Sagard, Lietzow, Glowe, Lohme
    - 38303 Baabe, Sellin
    - 38304 Garz/Rügen, Karnitz, Zudar
    - 38305 Gingst
    - 38306 Samtens, Rambin, Dreschvitz, Altefähr
    - 38307 Poseritz, Gustow
    - 38308 Ostseebad Göhren, Gager, Middelhagen, Thiessow
    - 38309 Trent, Schaprode
  - 3831 Stralsund, Kramerhof-Groß Kedingshagen, -Klein Kedingshagen, -Parow, -Vogelsang, Lüssow, Wendorf-Groß Lüdershagen, -Neu Lüdershagen, -Teschenhagen, -Zitterpenningshagen
  - 3832
    - 38320 Gremersdorf-Buchholz, Tribsees
    - 38321 Kummerow, Neu Bartelshagen, Niepars, Pantelitz
    - 38322 Franzburg, Gremersdorf-Buchholz-Grenzin, -Hohenbarnekow, -Neumühl, -Wolfsdorf, Millienhagen-Oebelitz, Richtenberg, Weitenhagen
    - 38323 Altenpleen, Groß Mohrdorf, Klausdorf, Kramerhof, Preetz, Prohn
    - 38324 Karnin, Löbnitz, Velgast
    - 38325 Gremersdorf-Buchholz-Buchholz, -Eichholz, Papenhagen, Splietsdorf
    - 38326 Grimmen, Süderholz-Barkow, -Bartmannshagen, -Boltenhagen, -Kandelin, -Kaschow, -Willerswalde, -Zarnewanz, Splietsdorf-Müggenwalde, Wendisch Baggendorf
    - 38327 Elmenhorst, Wittenhagen, Jakobsdorf, Steinhagen, Wendorf, Zarrendorf
    - 38328 Behnkendorf, Brandshagen, Miltzow, Reinberg
  - 3833
    - 38331 Süderholz-Bretwisch, -Dönnie, -Grabow, -Grischow, -Gölzow-Dorf, -Poggendorf, -Rakow, -Wüstenbilow
    - 38332 Süderholz-Griebenow, -Groß Bisdorf, -Klein Bisdorf, -Klevenow, -Kreutzmannshagen, -Lüssow, -Neuendorf, -Prützmannshagen, -Schmietkow, -Willershusen, -Wüst Eldena, -Wüsteney
    - 38333 Horst, Wilmshagen
    - 38334 Glewitz
  - 3834 Greifswald
  - 3835
    - 38351 Kirchdorf
  - 3836 Wolgast
  - 3837
    - 38370 Kröslin, Freest
    - 38371 Trassenheide, Karlshagen, Peenemünde
    - 38372 Usedom
    - 38375 Ückeritz
    - 38376 Zirchow
    - 38377 Zinnowitz
    - 38378 Heringsdorf, Seebad Ahlbeck, Bansin
  - 3838 Bergen auf Rügen, Buschvitz, Parchtitz, Patzig, Ralswiek, Rappin, Sehlen
  - 3839
    - 38391 Altenkirchen
    - 38392 Sassnitz
    - 38393 Binz, Zirkow

==== 384 – Wismar and surroundings ====
  - 3841 Wismar
  - 3842
    - 38422 Neukloster
    - 38423 Bad Kleinen
    - 38424 Bobitz
    - 38425 Kirchdorf (Poel)
    - 38426 Neuburg
    - 38427 Blowatz
    - 38428 Hohenkirchen
    - 38429 Glasin
  - 3843 Güstrow
  - 3844 Schwaan
  - 3845
    - 38450 Tarnow
    - 38451 Hoppenrade
    - 38452 Lalendorf
    - 38453 Mistorf
    - 38454 Kritzkow
    - 38455 Plaaz
    - 38456 Langhagen
    - 38457 Krakow am See
    - 38458 Zehna
    - 38459 Laage
  - 3846
    - 38461 Bützow
    - 38462 Baumgarten
    - 38464 Bernitt
    - 38466 Jürgenshagen
  - 3847 Sternberg
  - 3848
    - 38481 Witzin
    - 38482 Warin
    - 38483 Brüel
    - 38484 Ventschow
    - 38485 Dabel
    - 38486 Gustävel
    - 38488 Demen

==== 385/0386 – Schwerin and surroundings ====
- 385 Schwerin
- 386
  - 3860 Raben Steinfeld
  - 3861 Plate
  - 3863 Crivitz
  - 3865 Holthusen
  - 3866 Cambs
  - 3867 Lübstorf
  - 3868 Rastow
  - 3869 Dümmer

==== 387 - Parchim and surroundings ====
  - 3871 Parchim
  - 3872
    - 38720 Grebbin
    - 38721 Ziegendorf
    - 38722 Raduhn
    - 38723 Kladrum
    - 38724 Siggelkow
    - 38725 Groß Godems
    - 38726 Spornitz
    - 38727 Mestlin
    - 38728 Domsühl
    - 38729 Marnitz
  - 3873
    - 38731 Lübz
    - 38732 Gallin
    - 38733 Karbow
    - 38735 Plau
    - 38736 Goldberg (Mecklenburg)
    - 38737 Ganzlin
    - 38738 Karow (Mecklenburg)
  - 3874 Ludwigslust
  - 3875
    - 38750 Malliss
    - 38751 Picher
    - 38752 Zierzow
    - 38753 Wöbbelin
    - 38754 Leussow
    - 38755 Eldena
    - 38756 Grabow (Mecklenburg)
    - 38757 Neustadt-Glewe
    - 38758 Dömitz
    - 38759 Tewswoos
  - 3876 Perleberg
  - 3877 Wittenberge
  - 3878
    - 38780 Lanz
    - 38781 Mellen
    - 38782 Reetz
    - 38783 Dallmin
    - 38784 Kleinow
    - 38785 Berge
    - 38787 Glöwen
    - 38788 Groß Warnow
    - 38789 Wolfshagen
  - 3879
    - 38791 Bad Wilsnack
    - 38792 Lenzen (Elbe)
    - 38793 Dergenthin
    - 38794 Cumlosen
    - 38796 Viesecke
    - 38797 Karstädt

==== 388 - Grevesmühlen and surroundings ====
  - 3881 Grevesmühlen
  - 3882
    - 38821 Lüdersdorf
    - 38822 Rüting OT Diedrichshagen
    - 38823 Selmsdorf
    - 38824 Mallentin
    - 38825 Klütz
    - 38826 Dassow
    - 38827 Kalkhorst
    - 38828 Schönberg
  - 3883 Hagenow
  - 3884
    - 38841 Amt Neuhaus
    - 38842 Greven OT Lüttenmark
    - 38843 Vellahn OT Bennin
    - 38844 Neu Gülze
    - 38845 Amt Neuhaus OT Kaarßen
    - 38847 Boizenburg/Elbe
    - 38848 Vellahn
  - 3885
    - 38850 Gammelin
    - 38851 Zarrentin am Schaalsee
    - 38852 Wittenburg
    - 38853 Wittendörp OT Drönnewitz
    - 38854 Redefin
    - 38855 Lübtheen
    - 38856 Pritzier
    - 38858 Zarrentin am Schaalsee OT Lassahn
    - 38859 Alt Zachun
  - 3886 Gadebusch
  - 3887
    - 38871 Mühlen Eichsen
    - 38872 Rehna
    - 38873 Carlow
    - 38874 Lützow
    - 38875 Schlagsdorf
    - 38876 Roggendorf

=== 39 - Magdeburg, Neubrandenburg, and surroundings ===
==== 390 - Salzwedel and surroundings ====
- 390
  - 3900
    - 39000 Beetzendorf
    - 39001 Apenburg
    - 39002 Oebisfelde
    - 39003 Jübar
    - 39004 Köckte bei Gardelegen
    - 39005 Kusey
    - 39006 Miesterhorst
    - 39007 Tangeln
    - 39008 Kunrau
    - 39009 Badel
  - 3901 Salzwedel
  - 3902 Diesdorf
  - 3903
    - 39030 Brunau
    - 39031 Dähre
    - 39032 Mahlsdorf bei Salzwedel
    - 39033 Wallstawe
    - 39034 Fleetmark
    - 39035 Kuhfelde
    - 39036 Binde
    - 39037 Pretzier
    - 39038 Henningen
    - 39039 Bonese
  - 3904 Haldensleben
  - 3905
    - 39050 Bartensleben
    - 39051 Calvörde
    - 39052 Erxleben bei Haldensleben
    - 39053 Süplingen
    - 39054 Flechtingen
    - 39055 Hörsingen
    - 39056 Klüden
    - 39057 Rätzlingen, Saxony-Anhalt
    - 39058 Uthmöden
    - 39059 Wegenstedt
  - 3906
    - 39061 Weferlingen
    - 39062 Bebertal
  - 3907 Gardelegen
  - 3908
    - 39080 Kalbe an der Milde
    - 39081 Kakerbeck Sachsen-Anhalt
    - 39082 Mieste
    - 39083 Messdorf
    - 39084 Lindstedt
    - 39085 Zichtau
    - 39086 Jävenitz
    - 39087 Jerchel
    - 39088 Letzlingen
    - 39089 Bismark
  - 3909 Klötze Altmark

==== 391/0392 – Magdeburg and surroundings ====
- 391 Magdeburg
- 392
  - 3920
    - 39200 Gommern
    - 39201 Wolmirstedt
    - 39202 Groß Ammensleben
    - 39203 Barleben
    - 39204 Niederndodeleben
    - 39205 Langenweddingen
    - 39206 Eichenbarleben
    - 39207 Colbitz
    - 39208 Loitsche
    - 39209 Wanzleben
  - 3921 Burg bei Magdeburg
  - 3922
    - 39221 Möckern
    - 39222 Möser
    - 39223 Theessen
    - 39224 Büden
    - 39225 Altengrabow
    - 39226 Hohenziatz
  - 3923 Zerbst/Anhalt
  - 3924
    - 39241 Leitzkau
    - 39242 Prödel
    - 39243 Nedlitz (Jerichower Land)
    - 39244 Steutz
    - 39245 Loburg
    - 39246 Lindau (Anhalt)
    - 39247 Güterglück
    - 39248 Dobritz
  - 3925 Staßfurt
  - 3926
    - 39262 Güsten
    - 39263 Unseburg
    - 39264 Kroppenstedt
    - 39265 Löderburg
    - 39266 Förderstedt
    - 39267 Schneidlingen
    - 39268 Egeln
  - 3928 Schönebeck (Elbe)
  - 3929
    - 39291 Calbe (Saale)
    - 39292 Biederitz
    - 39293 Dreileben
    - 39294 Groß Rosenburg
    - 39295 Zuchau
    - 39296 Welsleben
    - 39297 Eickendorf
    - 39298 Barby

==== 393 – Stendal and surroundings ====
  - 3931 Stendal
  - 3932
    - 39320 Schinne
    - 39321 Arneburg
    - 39322 Tangermünde
    - 39323 Schönhausen (Elbe)
    - 39324 Kläden
    - 39325 Vinzelberg
    - 39327 Klietz
    - 39328 Rochau
    - 39329 Möringen
  - 3933 Genthin
  - 3934
    - 39341 Redekin
    - 39342 Gladau
    - 39343 Jerichow
    - 39344 Güsen
    - 39345 Parchen
    - 39346 Tucheim
    - 39347 Kade
    - 39348 Klitsche
    - 39349 Parey (Elbe)
  - 3935 Tangerhütte
  - 3936
    - 39361 Lüderitz (bei Stendal)
    - 39362 Grieben (Sachsen-Anhalt)
    - 39363 Angern
    - 39364 Dolle
    - 39365 Bellingen
    - 39366 Kehnert
  - 3937 Osterburg
  - 3938
    - 39382 Kamern
    - 39383 Sandau
    - 39384 Arendsee (Altmark)
    - 39386 Seehausen (Altmark)
    - 39387 Havelberg
    - 39388 Goldbeck (Altmark)
  - 3939
    - 39390 Iden
    - 39391 Lückstedt
    - 39392 Rönnebeck
    - 39393 Werben (Elbe)
    - 39394 Hohenberg-Krusemark
    - 39395 Wanzer
    - 39396 Neukirchen (Altmark)
    - 39397 Geestgottberg
    - 39398 Groß Garz
    - 39399 Kleinau

==== 394 – Halberstadt and surroundings ====
  - 3940
    - 39400 Wefensleben
    - 39401 Neuwegersleben
    - 39402 Völpke
    - 39403 Gröningen
    - 39404 Ausleben
    - 39405 Hötensleben
    - 39406 Harbke
    - 39407 Seehausen (Börde)
    - 39408 Hadmersleben
    - 39409 Eilsleben
  - 3941 Halberstadt
  - 3942
    - 39421 Osterwieck
    - 39422 Badersleben
    - 39423 Wegeleben
    - 39424 Schwanebeck
    - 39425 Dingelstedt
    - 39426 Hessen am Fallstein
    - 39427 Schachdorf Ströbeck
    - 39428 Pabstorf
  - 3943 Wernigerode
  - 3944 Blankenburg (Harz)
  - 3945
    - 39451 Wasserleben
    - 39452 Ilsenburg
    - 39453 Derenburg
    - 39454 Elbingerode
    - 39455 Schierke
    - 39456 Altenbrak
    - 39457 Benneckenstein
    - 39458 Heudeber
    - 39459 Hasselfelde
  - 3946 Quedlinburg
  - 3947 Thale
  - 3948
    - 39481 Hedersleben
    - 39482 Gatersleben
    - 39483 Ballenstedt
    - 39484 Harzgerode
    - 39485 Gernrode
    - 39487 Friedrichsbrunn
    - 39488 Güntersberge
    - 39489 Straßberg
  - 3949 Oschersleben (Bode)

==== 395/396 – Neubrandenburg and surroundings ====
- 395 Neubrandenburg
- 396
  - 3960
    - 39600 Zwiedorf
    - 39601 Friedland, Mecklenburg-Vorpommern
    - 39602 Kleeth
    - 39603 Burg Stargard
    - 39604 Wildberg
    - 39605 Groß Nemerow
    - 39606 Glienke
    - 39607 Kotelow
    - 39608 Staven
  - 3961 Altentreptow
  - 3962 Penzlin
  - 3963 Woldegk
  - 3964 Bredenfelde
  - 3965 Burow
  - 3966 Cölpin
  - 3967 Oertzenhof (Mecklenburg-Strelitz)
  - 3968 Schönbeck
  - 3969 Siedenbollentin

==== 397 – Anklam and surroundings ====
  - 3971 Anklam
  - 3972
    - 39721 Liepen
    - 39722 Sarnow
    - 39723 Krien
    - 39724 Klein Bünzow
    - 39726 Ducherow
    - 39727 Spantekow
    - 39728 Medow
  - 3973 Pasewalk
  - 3974
    - 39740 Nechlin
    - 39741 Jatznick
    - 39742 Brüssow
    - 39743 Zerrenthin
    - 39744 Rothenklempenow
    - 39745 Hetzdorf (Uckermark)
    - 39746 Krackow
    - 39747 Züsedom
    - 39748 Viereck
    - 39749 Grambow
  - 3975
    - 39751 Penkun
    - 39752 Blumenhagen
    - 39753 Strasburg
    - 39754 Löcknitz
  - 3976 Torgelow
  - 3977
    - 39771 Ueckermünde
    - 39772 Rothemühl
    - 39773 Altwarp
    - 39774 Mönkebude
    - 39775 Ahlbeck (Uecker-Randow)
    - 39776 Hintersee
    - 39777 Borkenfriede
    - 39778 Ferdinandshof
    - 39779 Eggesin

==== 398 – Neustrelitz and surroundings ====
  - 3981 Neustrelitz
  - 3982
    - 39820 Triepkendorf
    - 39821 Carpin
    - 39822 Kratzeburg
    - 39823 Rechlin
    - 39824 Hohenzieritz
    - 39825 Wokuhl-Dabelow
    - 39826 Blankensee
    - 39827 Schwarz
    - 39828 Wustrow
    - 39829 Blankenförde
  - 3983
    - 39831 Feldberg
    - 39832 Wesenberg
    - 39833 Mirow
  - 3984 Prenzlau
  - 3985
    - 39851 Göritz
    - 39852 Schönermark (Nordwestuckermark)
    - 39853 Holzendorf
    - 39854 Kleptow
    - 39855 Weggun
    - 39856 Beenz
    - 39857 Drense
    - 39858 Bietikow
    - 39859 Fürstenwerder
  - 3986
    - 39861 Gramzow
    - 39862 Schmölln
    - 39863 Seehausen (Uckermark)
  - 3987 Templin
  - 3988
    - 39881 Ringenwalde
    - 39882 Gollin
    - 39883 Groß Dölln
    - 39884 Haßleben
    - 39885 Jakobshagen
    - 39886 Milmersdorf
    - 39887 Gerswalde
    - 39888 Lychen
    - 39889 Boitzenburg

==== 399 – Waren and surroundings ====
  - 3991 Waren (Müritz)
  - 3992
    - 39921 Ankershagen
    - 39922 Dambeck
    - 39923 Priborn
    - 39924 Stuer
    - 39925 Wredenhagen
    - 39926 Grabowhöfe
    - 39927 Nossentiner Hütte
    - 39928 Möllenhagen
    - 39929 Jabel
  - 3993
    - 39931 Röbel/Müritz
    - 39932 Malchow
    - 39933 Vollrathsruhe
    - 39934 Klein Plasten
  - 3994 Malchin
  - 3995
    - 39951 Faulenrost
    - 39952 Grammentin
    - 39953 Schwinkendorf
    - 39954 Stavenhagen
    - 39955 Jürgenstorf
    - 39956 Neukalen
    - 39957 Gielow
    - 39959 Dargun
  - 3996 Teterow
  - 3997
    - 39971 Gnoien
    - 39972 Walkendorf
    - 39973 Altkalen
    - 39975 Thürkow
    - 39976 Groß Bützin
    - 39977 Jördenstorf
    - 39978 Groß Roge
  - 3998 Demmin
  - 3999
    - 39991 Daberkow
    - 39992 Görmin
    - 39993 Hohenmocker
    - 39994 Metschow
    - 39995 Nossendorf
    - 39996 Törpin
    - 39997 Jarmen
    - 39998 Loitz
    - 39999 Tutow

== 4 ==
=== 40 – Hamburg and surroundings ===
- 40 Hamburg, Norderstedt, Neu Wulmstorf

=== 41 – Further surroundings of Hamburg ===
==== 0410 – calling areas immediately bordering Hamburg ====
  - 4101 Pinneberg
  - 4102 Ahrensburg
  - 4103 Wedel
  - 4104 Aumühle
  - 4105 Seevetal
  - 4106 Quickborn (Kreis Pinneberg)
  - 4107 Siek (Holstein)
  - 4108 Rosengarten, Lower Saxony
  - 4109 Tangstedt

==== 411 – currently unassigned ====
currently unassigned (was Hamburg)

==== 412 – Elmshorn and surroundings ====
  - 4120 Ellerhoop
  - 4121 Elmshorn
  - 4122 Tornesch, Uetersen, Moorrege, Heist, Heidgraben and Groß Nordende
  - 4123 Barmstedt
  - 4124 Glückstadt
  - 4125 Seestermühe
  - 4126 Horst
  - 4127 Brande-Hörnerkirchen, Westerhorn
  - 4128 Kollmar
  - 4129 Haseldorf

==== 413 – Lüneburg and surroundings ====
  - 4131 Lüneburg
  - 4132 Amelinghausen
  - 4133 Wittorf, Handorf
  - 4134 Embsen
  - 4135 Kirchgellersen
  - 4136 Scharnebeck
  - 4137 Barendorf
  - 4138 Betzendorf
  - 4139 Hohnstorf

==== 414 – Stade and surroundings ====
  - 4140 Estorf
  - 4141 Stade
  - 4142 Steinkirchen
  - 4143 Drochtersen
  - 4144 Himmelpforten
  - 4146 Stade-Bützfleth
  - 4148 Drochtersen-Assel
  - 4149 Fredenbeck

==== 415 – Lauenburg and surroundings ====
  - 4151 Schwarzenbek
  - 4152 Geesthacht
  - 4153 Lauenburg
  - 4154 Trittau
  - 4155 Büchen
  - 4156 Talkau
  - 4158 Roseburg
  - 4159 Basthorst

==== 416 – Buxtehude and surroundings ====
  - 4161 Buxtehude
  - 4162 Jork
  - 4163 Horneburg
  - 4164 Harsefeld
  - 4165 Hollenstedt
  - 4166 Ahlerstedt
  - 4167 Apensen
  - 4168 Neu Wulmstorf-Elstorf
  - 4169 Sauensiek

==== 417 – Winsen and surroundings ====
  - 4171 Winsen (Luhe)
  - 4172 Salzhausen
  - 4173 Wulfsen
  - 4174 Stelle (Landkreis Harburg)
  - 4175 Egestorf
  - 4176 Marschacht
  - 4177 Drage
  - 4178 Radbruch
  - 4179 Winsen-Tönnhausen

==== 418 – Buchholz and surroundings ====
  - 4180 Königsmoor
  - 4181 Buchholz in der Nordheide
  - 4182 Tostedt
  - 4183 Jesteburg
  - 4184 Hanstedt
  - 4185 Marxen
  - 4186 Buchholz-Trelde, Buchholz-Sprötze
  - 4187 Holm-Seppensen
  - 4188 Welle
  - 4189 Undeloh

==== 419 – Kaltenkirchen and surroundings ====
  - 4191 Kaltenkirchen
  - 4192 Bad Bramstedt
  - 4193 Henstedt-Ulzburg
  - 4194 Sievershütten
  - 4195 Hartenholm

=== 42 – Bremen and surroundings ===
==== 420 – Oyten and surroundings ====
  - 4202 Achim
  - 4203 Weyhe
  - 4204 Thedinghausen
  - 4205 Ottersberg
  - 4206 Stuhr-Heiligenrode
  - 4207 Oyten
  - 4208 Grasberg
  - 4209 Schwanewede

==== 421 – Bremen and surroundings ====
- 421 Bremen

==== 422 – Delmenhorst and surroundings ====
  - 4221 Delmenhorst
  - 4222 Ganderkesee
  - 4223 Ganderkesee-Bookholzberg
  - 4224 Groß Ippener

==== 423 – Verden and surroundings ====
  - 4230 Verden (Aller)-Walle
  - 4231 Verden (Aller)
  - 4232 Langwedel (Kreis Verden (Aller))
  - 4233 Blender
  - 4234 Dörverden
  - 4235 Langwedel (Kreis Verden (Aller))
  - 4236 Kirchlinteln
  - 4237 Kirchlinteln-Bendingbostel
  - 4238 Kirchlinteln-Neddenaverbergen
  - 4239 Dörverden-Westen

==== 424 – Syke and surroundings ====
  - 4241 Bassum
  - 4242 Syke
  - 4243 Twistringen
  - 4244 Harpstedt
  - 4245 Scholen
  - 4246 Drentwede
  - 4247 Sudwalde/Affinghausen
  - 4249 Nordwohlde

==== 425 – Eystrup and surroundings ====
  - 4251 Hoya
  - 4252 Bruchhausen-Vilsen
  - 4253 Asendorf (Samtgemeinde Bruchhausen-Vilsen)
  - 4254 Eystrup
  - 4255 Martfeld (Samtgemeinde Bruchhausen-Vilsen)
  - 4256 Hilgermissen
  - 4257 Schweringen
  - 4258 Schwarme (Samtgemeinde Bruchhausen-Vilsen)

==== 426 – Rotenburg and surroundings ====
  - 4260 Visselhövede-Wittorf
  - 4261 Rotenburg (Wümme)
  - 4262 Visselhövede
  - 4263 Scheeßel
  - 4264 Sottrum (Kreis Rotenburg (Wümme))
  - 4265 Fintel
  - 4266 Brockel (Samtgemeinde Bothel)
  - 4267 Lauenbrück (Samtgemeinde Fintel)
  - 4268 Bötersen (Samtgemeinde Sottrum)
  - 4269 Ahausen-Kirchwalsede (Samtgemeinden Bothel and Sottrum)

==== 427 – Sulingen and surroundings ====
  - 4271 Sulingen
  - 4272 Siedenburg
  - 4273 Kirchdorf
  - 4274 Varrel (Samtgemeinde Kirchdorf)
  - 4275 Ehrenburg (Samtgemeinde Schwaförden)
  - 4276 Borstel (Samtgemeinde Siedenburg)
  - 4277 Schwaförden

==== 428 – Zeven and surroundings ====
  - 4281 Zeven
  - 4282 Sittensen
  - 4283 Tarmstedt
  - 4284 Selsingen
  - 4285 Rhade (Samtgemeinde Selsingen)
  - 4286 Gyhum (Samtgemeinde Zeven)
  - 4287 Heeslingen-Boitzen (Samtgemeinde Zeven)
  - 4288 Horstedt (Samtgemeinde Sottrum)
  - 4289 Kirchtimke (Samtgemeinde Tarmstedt)

==== 429 – Ottersberg and surroundings ====
  - 4292 Ritterhude
  - 4293 Ottersberg-Fischerhude
  - 4294 Riede (Samtgemeinde Thedinghausen)
  - 4295 Emtinghausen (Samtgemeinde Thedinghausen)
  - 4296 Schwanewede-Aschwarden
  - 4297 Ottersberg-Posthausen
  - 4298 Lilienthal

=== 43 – Kiel and surroundings ===
==== 430 – Raisdorf and surroundings ====
  - 4301 (not assigned)
  - 4302 Kirchbarkau
  - 4303 Schlesen
  - 4304 (not assigned)
  - 4305 Westensee
  - 4306 (not assigned)
  - 4307 Raisdorf
  - 4308 Schwedeneck
  - 4309 (not assigned)

==== 431 – Kiel and surroundings ====
- 431 Kiel

==== 432 – Neumünster and surroundings ====
  - 4320 Heidmühlen
  - 4321 Neumünster
  - 4322 Bordesholm
  - 4323 Bornhöved
  - 4324 Brokstedt
  - 4325 (not assigned)
  - 4326 Wankendorf
  - 4327 Großenaspe
  - 4328 Rickling
  - 4329 Langwedel

==== 433 – Rendsburg and surroundings ====
  - 4330 Emkendorf
  - 4331 Rendsburg
  - 4332 Hamdorf
  - 4333 Erfde
  - 4334 Bredenbek
  - 4335 Hohn
  - 4336 Owschlag
  - 4337 Jevenstedt
  - 4338 Alt Duvenstedt
  - 4339 Christiansholm

==== 434 – Laboe and surroundings ====
  - 4340 Achterwehr
  - 4341 (not assigned)
  - 4342 Kühren, Lehmkuhlen, Preetz
  - 4343 Laboe
  - 4344 Schönberg
  - 4345 (not assigned)
  - 4346 Gettorf
  - 4347 Flintbek
  - 4348 Schönkirchen
  - 4349 Dänischenhagen

==== 435 – Eckernförde and surroundings ====
  - 4350 (not assigned)
  - 4351 Eckernförde
  - 4352 Damp
  - 4353 Ascheffel
  - 4354 Fleckeby
  - 4355 Rieseby
  - 4356 Groß Wittensee
  - 4357 Sehestedt
  - 4358 Loose
  - 4359 (not assigned)

==== 436 – Oldenburg and surroundings ====
  - 4360 (not assigned)
  - 4361 Oldenburg
  - 4362 Heiligenhafen
  - 4363 Lensahn
  - 4364 Dahme
  - 4365 Heringsdorf
  - 4366 Grömitz-Cismar
  - 4367 Großenbrode
  - 4368 (not assigned)
  - 4368 (not assigned)

==== 437 – Fehmarn and surroundings ====
  - 4370 (not assigned)
  - 4371 Burg auf Fehmarn
  - 4372 Fehmarn
  - 4373 (not assigned)
  - 4374 (not assigned)
  - 4375 (not assigned)
  - 4376 (not assigned)
  - 4377 (not assigned)
  - 4378 (not assigned)
  - 4379 (not assigned)

==== 438 – Lütjenburg and surroundings ====
  - 4380 (not assigned)
  - 4381 Lütjenburg
  - 4382 Wangels
  - 4383 Grebin
  - 4384 Selent
  - 4385 Hohenfelde
  - 4386 (not assigned)
  - 4387 (not assigned)
  - 4388 (not assigned)
  - 4389 (not assigned)

==== 439 – Nortorf and surroundings ====
  - 4390 (not assigned)
  - 4391 (not assigned)
  - 4392 Nortorf
  - 4393 Boostedt
  - 4394 Bokhorst
  - 4395 (not assigned)
  - 4396 (not assigned)
  - 4397 (not assigned)
  - 4398 (not assigned)
  - 4399 (not assigned)

=== 44 – Oldenburg and surroundings ===
==== 440 – Brake and surroundings ====
  - 4401 Brake/Unterweser
  - 4402 Rastede/Wiefelstede
  - 4404 Elsfleth
  - 4405 Edewecht
  - 4406 Berne
  - 4407 Wardenburg
  - 4408 Hude

==== 441 – Oldenburg and surroundings ====
- 441 Oldenburg (Oldb.)

==== 442 – Wilhelmshaven and surroundings ====
  - 4421 Wilhelmshaven
  - 4422 Sande (Friesland) Kr.Friesl
  - 4423 Fedderwarden (Wilhelmshaven)
  - 4425 Wangerland-Hooksiel
  - 4426 Wangerland-Horumersiel

==== 443 – Wildeshausen and surroundings ====
  - 4431 Wildeshausen
  - 4432 Doetlingen-Brettorf
  - 4433 Doetlingen
  - 4434 Colnrade
  - 4435 Großenkneten

==== 444 – Vechta and surroundings ====
  - 4441 Vechta
  - 4442 Lohne Oldb.
  - 4443 Dinklage
  - 4444 Goldenstedt
  - 4445 Visbek Kr.Vechta
  - 4446 Bakum Kr.Vechta
  - 4447 Vechta-Langförden

==== 445 – Varel and surroundings ====
  - 4451 Varel Jadebusen
  - 4452 Zetel-Neuenburg
  - 4453 Zetel
  - 4454 Jade
  - 4455 Jade-Schweiburg
  - 4456 Varel-Altjührden
  - 4458 Wiefelstede-Spohle

==== 446 – Friesland and surroundings ====
  - 4461 Jever
  - 4462 Wittmund
  - 4463 Wangerland
  - 4464 Wittmund-Carolinensiel
  - 4465 Friedeburg Ostfriesland
  - 4466 Wittmund-Ardorf
  - 4467 Wittmund-Funnix
  - 4468 Friedeburg-Reepsholt
  - 4469 Wangerooge

==== 447 – Cloppenburg and surroundings ====
  - 4471 Cloppenburg
  - 4472 Lastrup
  - 4473 Emstek
  - 4474 Garrel
  - 4475 Molbergen
  - 4477 Lastrup-Hemmelte
  - 4478 Cappeln Oldb.
  - 4479 Molbergen-Peheim
  - 4480 Ovelgoenne-Strückhausen

==== 448 – Westerstede and surroundings ====
  - 4481 Hatten-Sandkrug
  - 4482 Hatten
  - 4483 Ovelgoenne-Grossenmeer
  - 4484 Hude-Wüsting
  - 4485 Elsfleth-Huntorf
  - 4486 Edewecht-Friedrichsfehn
  - 4487 Grossenkneten-Huntlosen
  - 4488 Westerstede
  - 4489 Apen

==== 449 – Friesoythe and surroundings ====
  - 4491 Friesoythe
  - 4492 Saterland
  - 4493 Friesoythe-Gehlenberg
  - 4494 Bösel b.Friesoythe
  - 4495 Friesoythe-Thuele
  - 4496 Friesoythe-Markhausen
  - 4497 Barßel-Harkebrügge
  - 4498 Saterland-Ramsloh
  - 4499 Barßel

=== 45 – Lübeck and surroundings ===
==== 450 – Kastorf and surroundings ====
  - 4501 Kastorf
  - 4502 Lübeck-Travemünde
  - 4503 Timmendorfer Strand
  - 4504 Ratekau
  - 4505 Stockelsdorf-Curau
  - 4506 Heilshoop
  - 4507 not assigned
  - 4508 Krummesse
  - 4509 Groß Grönau

==== 451 – Lübeck and surroundings ====
  - 451 1 – Lübeck, Bad Schwartau, Stockelsdorf
  - 451 2 – Bad Schwartau
  - 451 3 – St. Gertrud (Nord), Schlutup, Kücknitz
  - 451 4 – St. Lorenz-Nord, Stockelsdorf
  - 451 5 – St. Jürgen (Süd)
  - 451 6 – St. Gertrud (Süd)
  - 451 7 – Innenstadt, St. Jürgen (Nord)
  - 451 8 – St. Lorenz-Süd, Buntekuh, Moisling

==== 452 – Plön and surroundings ====
  - 4521 Eutin
  - 4522 Plön
  - 4523 Bad Malente-Gremsmühlen
  - 4524 Süsel
  - 4525 Ahrensbök
  - 4526 Ascheberg
  - 4527 Bosau
  - 4528 Schönwalde am Bungsberg
  - 4529 not assigned

==== 453 – Lauenburg and surroundings ====
  - 4531 Bad Oldesloe
  - 4532 Bargteheide
  - 4533 Reinfeld in Holstein
  - 4534 Schönberg, Kreis Herzogtum Lauenburg
  - 4535 Kayhude
  - 4536 Sandesneben
  - 4537 Grabau
  - 4538 not assigned
  - 4539 Rethwisch

==== 454 – Salem and surroundings ====
  - 4541 Ratzeburg
  - 4542 Mölln
  - 4543 Nusse
  - 4544 Berkenthin
  - 4545 Salem
  - 4546 Mustin
  - 4547 Gudow in Lauenburg
  - 4548 not assigned
  - 4549 not assigned

==== 455 – Bad Segeberg and surroundings ====
  - 4551 Bad Segeberg
  - 4552 Bebensee
  - 4553 Geschendorf
  - 4554 Wahlstedt
  - 4555 Seedorf bei Bad Segeberg
  - 4556 Travenhorst
  - 4557 Tensfeld
  - 4558 Fredesdorf
  - 4559 Wensin

==== 456 – Neustadt and surroundings ====
  - 4561 Neustadt in Holstein
  - 4562 Grömitz
  - 4563 Sierksdorf
  - 4564 Schashagen
  - 4565 not assigned
  - 4566 not assigned
  - 4567 not assigned
  - 4568 not assigned
  - 4569 not assigned
- 457

not assigned

- 458

not assigned

- 459

not assigned

=== 46 – Flensburg and surroundings ===
==== 460/0461 – Flensburg and surroundings ====
- 460
  - 4602 Freienwill
  - 4603 Havetoft
  - 4604 Grossenwiehe
  - 4605 Medelby
  - 4606 Wanderup
  - 4607 Janneby
  - 4608 Handewitt
  - 4609 Eggebek
- 461 Flensburg

==== 462 – Schleswig and surroundings ====
  - 4621 Schleswig
  - 4622 Taarstedt
  - 4623 Böklund
  - 4624 Kropp
  - 4625 Jübek
  - 4626 Treia
  - 4627 Dörpstedt

==== 463 – Glücksburg and surroundings ====
  - 4630 Barderup
  - 4631 Glücksburg (Ostsee)
  - 4632 Steinbergkirche
  - 4633 Satrup
  - 4634 Husby
  - 4635 Sörup
  - 4636 Langballig
  - 4637 Sterup
  - 4638 Tarp
  - 4639 Schafflund

==== 464 – Kappeln and surroundings ====
  - 4641 Süderbrarup
  - 4642 Kappeln an der Schlei
  - 4643 Gelting (Angeln)
  - 4644 Karby Schwansen
  - 4646 Mohrkirch

==== 465 – Sylt ====
  - 4651 Sylt

==== 466 – Niebüll and surroundings ====
  - 4661 Niebüll
  - 4662 Leck
  - 4663 Süderlügum
  - 4664 Neukirchen bei Niebüll
  - 4665 Emmelsbüll-Horsbüll
  - 4666 Ladelund
  - 4667 Dagebüll
  - 4668 Klanxbüll

==== 467 – Langenhorn and surroundings ====
  - 4671 Bredstedt
  - 4672 Langenhorn
  - 4673 Joldelund
  - 4674 Ockholm

==== 468 – Föhr ====
  - 4681 Wyk auf Föhr
  - 4682 Amrum
  - 4683 Oldsum
  - 4684 Langeneß (Hallig)

=== 47 – Bremerhaven and surroundings ===
==== 470 – Sandstedt and surroundings ====
  - 4702 Sandstedt
  - 4703 Loxstedt-Donnern
  - 4704 Drangstedt
  - 4705 Wremen
  - 4706 Schiffdorf
  - 4707 Langen-Neuenwalde
  - 4708 Ringstedt

==== 471 – Bremerhaven and surroundings ====
- 471 Bremerhaven

==== 472 – Cuxhaven and surroundings ====
  - 4721 Cuxhaven
  - 4722 Cuxhaven-Altenbruch
  - 4723 Cuxhaven-Altenwalde
  - 4724 Cuxhaven-Lüdingworth
  - 4725 Helgoland

==== 473 – Nordenham and surroundings ====
  - 4731 Nordenham
  - 4732 Stadland-Rodenkirchen
  - 4733 Butjadingen-Burhave
  - 4734 Stadland-Seefeld
  - 4735 Butjadingen-Stollhamm
  - 4736 Butjadingen-Tossens
  - 4737 Stadland-Schwei

==== 474 – Loxstedt and surroundings ====
  - 4740 Loxstedt-Dedesdorf
  - 4741 Nordholz b.Bremerhaven
  - 4742 Dorum
  - 4743 Langen b.Bremerhaven
  - 4744 Loxstedt
  - 4745 Bad Bederkesa
  - 4746 Hagen b.Bremerhaven
  - 4747 Beverstedt
  - 4748 Stubben b.Bremerhaven
  - 4749 Schiffdorf-Geestenseth

==== 475 – Otterndorf and surroundings ====
  - 4751 Otterndorf
  - 4752 Neuhaus (Oste)
  - 4753 Balje
  - 4754 Bülkau
  - 4755 Ihlienworth
  - 4756 Odisheim
  - 4757 Wanna
  - 4758 Nordleda

==== 476 – Bremervörde and surroundings ====
  - 4761 Bremervörde
  - 4762 Kutenholz
  - 4763 Gnarrenburg
  - 4764 Gnarrenburg-Klenkendorf
  - 4765 Ebersdorf b.Bremervörde
  - 4766 Basdahl
  - 4767 Bremervörde-Bevern
  - 4768 Hipstedt
  - 4769 Bremervörde-Iselersheim

==== 477 – Freiburg and surroundings ====
  - 4770 Wischhafen
  - 4771 Hemmoor
  - 4772 Oberndorf Oste
  - 4773 Lamstedt
  - 4774 Hechthausen
  - 4775 Grossenwörden
  - 4776 Osten-Altendorf
  - 4777 Cadenberge
  - 4778 Wingst
  - 4779 Freiburg an der Elbe

==== 479 – Osterholz-Scharmbeck and surroundings ====
  - 4791 Osterholz-Scharmbeck
  - 4792 Worpswede (Landkreis Osterholz)
  - 4793 Hambergen
  - 4794 Worpswede-Ostersode
  - 4795 Garlstedt
  - 4796 Teufelsmoor

=== 48 – Heide and surroundings ===
==== 480 – Dithmarschen and surroundings ====
  - 4802 Dellstedt, Wrohm
  - 4803 Delve, Pahlen
  - 4804 Nordhastedt
  - 4805 Schafstedt
  - 4806 Bargenstedt, Odderade, Sarzbüttel

==== 481 – Heide and surroundings ====
- 481 Heide

==== 482 – Itzehoe and surroundings ====
  - 4821 Itzehoe
  - 4822 Kellinghusen
  - 4823 Wilster
  - 4824 Krempe
  - 4825 Burg
  - 4826 Hohenlockstedt
  - 4827 Wacken
  - 4828 Lägerdorf
  - 4829 Wewelsfleth, Brokdorf

==== 483 – Neuenkirchen and surroundings ====
  - 4830 Süderhastedt
  - 4832 Meldorf
  - 4833 Wesselburen
  - 4834 Büsum
  - 4835 Albersdorf Holstein
  - 4836 Hennstedt, Dithmarschen
  - 4837 Neuenkirchen
  - 4838 Tellingstedt
  - 4839 Wöhrden, Dithmarschen

==== 484 – Husum and surroundings ====
  - 4841 Husum
  - 4842 Nordstrand
  - 4843 Viöl
  - 4844 Pellworm
  - 4845 Ostenfeld
  - 4846 Hattstedt
  - 4847 Oster-Ohrstedt
  - 4848 Rantrum
  - 4849 Hooge (Hallig)

==== 485 – Brunsbüttel and surroundings ====
  - 4851 Marne
  - 4852 Brunsbüttel
  - 4853 Sankt Michaelisdonn
  - 4854 Friedrichskoog
  - 4855 Eddelak
  - 4856 Kronprinzenkoog
  - 4857 Barlt
  - 4858 Sankt Margarethen
  - 4859 Windbergen

==== 486 – St. Peter-Ording and surroundings ====
  - 4861 Tönning
  - 4862 Garding
  - 4863 Sankt Peter-Ording
  - 4864 Oldenswort
  - 4865 Osterhever

==== 487 - Hohenwestedt and surroundings ====
  - 4871 Hohenwestedt
  - 4872 Hanerau-Hademarschen
  - 4873 Aukrug
  - 4874 Todenbüttel
  - 4875 Stafstedt
  - 4876 Reher
  - 4877 Hennstedt bei Itzehoe

==== 488 - Friedrichstadt and surroundings ====
  - 4881 Friedrichstadt
  - 4882 Lunden
  - 4883 Süderstapel
  - 4884 Schwabstedt
  - 4885 Bergenhusen

==== 489 - Town and surroundings ====
  - 4892 Schenefeld Mittelholstein
  - 4893 Hohenaspe

=== 49 – Emden and surroundings ===
==== 490 – Wymeer and surroundings ====
  - 4902 Jemgum-Ditzum
  - 4903 Wymeer (see German-language entry)

==== 491 – Leer and surroundings ====
- 491 Leer

==== 492 – Emden and surroundings ====
  - 4920 Wirdum
  - 4921 Emden
  - 4922 Borkum
  - 4923 Krummhörn-Pewsum
  - 4924 Moormerland-Oldersum
  - 4925 Hinte
  - 4926 Krummhörn-Greetsiel
  - 4927 Krummhörn-Loquard
  - 4928 Ihlow-Riepe
  - 4929 Ihlow

==== 493 – Norden and surroundings ====
  - 4931 Norden
  - 4932 Norderney
  - 4933 Dornum Ostfriesland
  - 4934 Marienhafe
  - 4935 Juist
  - 4936 Grossheide
  - 4938 Hagermarsch
  - 4939 Baltrum

==== 494 – Aurich and surroundings ====
  - 4941 Aurich
  - 4942 Südbrookmerland
  - 4943 Großefehn
  - 4944 Wiesmoor
  - 4945 Großefehn-Timmel
  - 4946 Großefehn-Bagband
  - 4947 Aurich-Ogenbargen
  - 4948 Wiesmoor-Marcardsmoor

==== 495 – Rhauderfehn and surroundings ====
  - 4950 Holtland
  - 4951 Weener
  - 4952 Rhauderfehn
  - 4953 Bunde
  - 4954 Moormerland
  - 4955 Westoverledingen
  - 4956 Uplengen
  - 4957 Detern
  - 4958 Jemgum
  - 4959 Dollart

==== 496 – Papenburg and surroundings ====
  - 4961 Papenburg
  - 4962 Aschendorf
  - 4963 Dörpen
  - 4964 Rhede (Ems)
  - 4965 Surwold
  - 4966 Neubörger
  - 4967 Rhauderfehn-Burlage
  - 4968 Neulehe

==== 497 – Esens and surroundings ====
  - 4971 Esens
  - 4972 Langeoog
  - 4973 Wittmund-Burhafe
  - 4974 Neuharlingersiel
  - 4975 Westerholt
  - 4976 Spiekeroog
  - 4977 Blomberg

== 5 ==
=== 50 – Nienburg-Wunstorf-Springe and surroundings ===
- 502
  - 5021 Nienburg (Weser)
  - 5022 Wietzen
  - 5023 Liebenau (bei Nienburg)
  - 5024 Rohrsen
  - 5025 Estorf (Weser)
  - 5026 Steimbke
  - 5027 Linsburg
  - 5028 Pennigsehl
- 503
  - 5031 Wunstorf
  - 5032 Neustadt am Rübenberge
  - 5033 Großenheidorn, Steinhude and Altenhagen/Hagenburg
  - 5034 Hagen (bei Neustadt am Rübenberge)
  - 5036 Schneeren
  - 5037 Bad Rehburg
- 504
  - 5041 Springe (Deister)
  - 5042 Bad Münder am Deister
  - 5043 Lauenau
  - 5044 Eldagsen
  - 5045 Bennigsen
- 505
  - 5051 Bergen, Lower Saxony (bei Celle)
  - 5052 Hermannsburg
  - 5053 Müden (Aller)
  - 5054 Sülze
  - 5055 Fassberg
  - 5056 Meissendorf
- 506
  - 5060 Bodenburg
  - 5062 Holle (bei Hildesheim)
  - 5063 Bad Salzdetfurth
  - 5064 Groß Düngen
  - 5065 Sibbesse
  - 5066 Sarstedt
  - 5067 Bockenem
  - 5068 Elze (Leine)
  - 5069 Nordstemmen
- 507
  - 5071 Schwarmstedt
  - 5072 Mandelsloh
  - 5073 Esperke
  - 5074 Rodewald
- 508
  - 5082 Langlingen
  - 5083 Hohne (bei Celle)
  - 5084 Hambühren
  - 5085 Ehlershausen
  - 5086 Scheuen

=== 51 – Hannover and surroundings ===
- 510
  - 5101 Pattensen
  - 5102 Laatzen
  - 5103 Wennigsen (Deister)
  - 5105 Barsinghausen
  - 5108 Gehrden
  - 5109 Ronnenberg
- 511 Hannover
- 512
  - 5121 Hildesheim
  - 5123 Schellerten
  - 5126 Algermissen
  - 5127 Harsum
  - 5128 Hohenhameln
  - 5129 Söhlde
- 513
  - 5130 Wedemark
  - 5131 Garbsen
  - 5132 Lehrte
  - 5135 Fuhrberg
  - 5136 Burgdorf (Hannover)
  - 5137 Seelze
  - 5138 Sehnde
  - 5139 Burgwedel
- 514
  - 5141 Celle
  - 5142 Eschede
  - 5143 Winsen (Aller)
  - 5144 Wathlingen
  - 5145 Beedenbostel
  - 5147 Hänigsen
  - 5146 Weitze
  - 5148 Steinhorst (Nieders.)
  - 5149 Wienhausen
- 515
  - 5151 Hameln
  - 5152 Hessisch Oldendorf
  - 5153 Salzhemmendorf
  - 5154 Aerzen
  - 5155 Emmerthal
  - 5156 Coppenbrügge
  - 5157 Börry
  - 5158 Hemeringen
  - 5159 Bisperode
- 516
  - 5161 Walsrode
  - 5162 Bad Fallingbostel
  - 5163 Dorfmark
  - 5164 Hodenhagen
  - 5165 Rethem (Aller)
  - 5166 Kirchboitzen
  - 5167 Westenholz
  - 5168 Stellichte
- 517
  - 5171 Peine
  - 5172 Ilsede
  - 5173 Uetze
  - 5174 Lahstedt
  - 5175 Arpke
  - 5176 Edemissen
  - 5177 Abbensen
- 518
  - 5181 Alfeld (Leine)
  - 5182 Gronau (Leine)
  - 5183 Lamspringe
  - 5184 Freden (Leine)
  - 5185 Duingen
  - 5186 Wallensen
  - 5187 Delligsen
- 519
  - 5190 Emmingen
  - 5191 Soltau
  - 5192 Munster
  - 5193 Schneverdingen
  - 5194 Bispingen
  - 5196 Wietzendorf
  - 5197 Frielingen
  - 5198 Wintermoor
  - 5199 Heber

=== 52 – Bielefeld and surroundings ===
- 520
  - 5200 (not assigned)
  - 5201 Halle (Westf.)
  - 5202 Oerlinghausen
  - 5203 Werther (Westfalen)
  - 5204 Steinhagen (Westfalen)
  - 5205 Sennestadt (Stadt Bielefeld)
  - 5206 Jöllenbeck, Theesen (Stadt Bielefeld)
  - 5207 Schloß Holte-Stukenbrock
  - 5208 Leopoldshöhe
  - 5209 Friedrichsdorf (Stadt Gütersloh)
- 521 Bielefeld
- 522
  - 5220 (not assigned)
  - 5221 Herford
  - 5222 Bad Salzuflen
  - 5223 Bünde
  - 5224 Enger (Westfalen)
  - 5225 Spenge
  - 5226 Bruchmühlen (Westfalen, Gemeinde Rödinghausen/Nordrhein-Westfalen bzw. Stadt Melle/Niedersachsen)
  - 5227 (not assigned)
  - 5228 Vlotho/Exter (Stadt Vlotho)
  - 5229 (not assigned)
- 523
  - 5230 (not assigned)
  - 5231 Detmold
  - 5232 Lage
  - 5233 Steinheim (Westfalen)
  - 5234 Horn-Bad Meinberg
  - 5235 Blomberg (Lippe)
  - 5236 Großenmarpe (Gemeinde Blomberg (Lippe))
  - 5237 Augustdorf
  - 5238 Himmighausen (Gemeinde Nieheim)
  - 5239 (not assigned)
- 524
  - 5240 (not assigned)
  - 5241 Gütersloh
  - 5242 Rheda-Wiedenbrück
  - 5243 (not assigned)
  - 5244 Rietberg
  - 5245 Herzebrock-Clarholz
  - 5246 Verl
  - 5247 Harsewinkel
  - 5248 Langenberg
  - 5249 (not assigned)
- 525
  - 5250 Delbrück (Westfalen)
  - 5251 Paderborn
  - 5252 Bad Lippspringe
  - 5253 Bad Driburg
  - 5254 Schloß Neuhaus (Stadt Paderborn)
  - 5255 Altenbeken
  - 5257 Hövelhof
  - 5258 Salzkotten
  - 5259 Neuenheerse (Stadt Bad Driburg)
- 526
  - 5260 (not assigned)
  - 5261 Lemgo
  - 5262 Extertal
  - 5263 Barntrup
  - 5264 Kalletal
  - 5265 Dörentrup
  - 5266 Kirchheide (Stadt Lemgo)
  - 5267 (not assigned)
  - 5268 (not assigned)
  - 5269 (not assigned)
- 527
  - 5270 (not assigned)
  - 5271 Höxter, Boffzen, Fürstenberg
  - 5272 Brakel (Westfalen)
  - 5273 Beverungen, Lauenförde, Derental
  - 5274 Nieheim
  - 5275 Ottbergen (Stadt Höxter)
  - 5276 Marienmünster
  - 5277 Fürstenau (Stadt Höxter)
  - 5278 Ovenhausen (Stadt Höxter)
  - 5279 (not assigned)
- 528
  - 5281 Bad Pyrmont
  - 5282 Schieder-Schwalenberg
  - 5283 Lügde -Rischenau
  - 5284 Schwalenberg (Gemeinde Schieder-Schwalenberg)
  - 5285 Kleinenberg
  - 5286 Ottenstein
  - 5287 (not assigned)
  - 5288 (not assigned)
  - 5289 (not assigned)
- 529
  - 5291 (not assigned)
  - 5292 Atteln (Stadt Lichtenau)
  - 5293 Dahl (Stadt Paderborn)
  - 5294 Espeln (Gemeinde Hövelhof)
  - 5295 Lichtenau
  - 5296 (not assigned)
  - 5297 (not assigned)
  - 5298 (not assigned)
  - 5299 (not assigned)

=== 53 – Braunschweig and surroundings ===
- 530
  - 5300 Üfingen
  - 5301 Lehre-Essenrode
  - 5302 Vechelde
  - 5303 Wendeburg
  - 5304 Meine
  - 5305 Sickte
  - 5306 Cremlingen
  - 5307 Braunschweig-Wenden
  - 5308 Lehre
  - 5309 Lehre-Wendhausen
- 531 Braunschweig
- 532
  - 5320 Torfhaus
  - 5321 Goslar
  - 5322 Bad Harzburg
  - 5323 Clausthal-Zellerfeld
  - 5324 Vienenburg
  - 5325 Hahnenklee
  - 5326 Langelsheim
  - 5327 Bad Grund (Harz)
  - 5328 Altenau (Harz)
  - 5329 Schulenberg (Oberharz)
- 533
  - 5331 Wolfenbüttel
  - 5332 Schöppenstedt
  - 5333 Dettum
  - 5334 Hornburg (bei Wolfenbüttel)
  - 5335 Schladen
  - 5336 Semmenstedt
  - 5337 Kissenbrück
  - 5339 Gielde
- 534
  - 5341 Salzgitter
  - 5344 Lengede
  - 5345 Baddeckenstedt
  - 5346 Liebenburg
  - 5347 Burgdorf (bei Salzgitter)
- 535
  - 5351 Helmstedt
  - 5352 Schöningen
  - 5353 Königslutter
  - 5354 Jerxheim
  - 5355 Frellstedt
  - 5356 Helmstedt-Barmke
  - 5357 Grasleben
  - 5358 Bahrdorf-Mackendorf
- 536
  - 5361 Wolfsburg
  - 5362 Wolfsburg-Fallersleben
  - 5363 Wolfsburg-Vorsfelde
  - 5364 Velpke
  - 5365 Wolfsburg-Neindorf
  - 5366 Jembke
  - 5367 Rühen
- 537
  - 5371 Gifhorn
  - 5372 Meinersen
  - 5373 Hillerse
  - 5374 Isenbüttel
  - 5375 Müden (Aller)
  - 5376 Wesendorf
  - 5378 Sassenburg-Platendorf
  - 5379 Sassenburg-Grussendorf
- 538
  - 5381 Seesen
  - 5382 Bad Gandersheim
  - 5383 Lutter am Barenberge
  - 5384 Groß Rhüden

=== 54 – Osnabrück and surroundings ===
- 540
  - 5401 Georgsmarienhütte
  - 5402 Bissendorf
  - 5403 Bad Iburg
  - 5404 Westerkappeln
  - 5405 Hasbergen (Osnabrück)
  - 5406 Belm
  - 5407 Wallenhorst
  - 5409 Hilter am Teutoburger Wald
- 541 Osnabrück
- 542
  - 5421 Dissen am Teutoburger Wald
  - 5422 Melle
  - 5423 Versmold
  - 5424 Bad Rothenfelde, Bad Laer, Hilter
  - 5425 Borgholzhausen
  - 5426 Glandorf
  - 5427 Buer (Stadt Melle)
  - 5428 Neuenkirchen (Stadt Melle)
  - 5429 Wellingholzhausen (Stadt Melle)
- 543
  - 5432 Löningen
  - 5433 Badbergen
  - 5434 Essen (Oldenburg)
  - 5435 Berge (bei Quakenbrück)
  - 5436 Nortrup
  - 5437 Menslage
  - 5438 Addrup, Gut Lage, Lüsche
  - 5439 Bersenbrück
- 544
  - 5441 Diepholz
  - 5442 Barnstorf
  - 5443 Lemförde
  - 5444 Wagenfeld
  - 5445 Drebber
  - 5446 Rehden
  - 5447 Lembruch
  - 5448 Barver
- 545
  - 5451 Ibbenbüren
  - 5452 Mettingen (Westfalen)
  - 5453 Recke
  - 5454 Riesenbeck
  - 5455 Brochterbeck
  - 5456 Velpe
  - 5457 Schale
  - 5458 Hopsten
  - 5459 Hörstel
- 546
  - 5461 Bramsche
  - 5462 Ankum
  - 5464 Alfhausen
  - 5465 Neuenkirchen (bei Bramsche)
  - 5466 Merzen
  - 5468 Engter
- 547
  - 5471 Bohmte
  - 5472 Bad Essen
  - 5473 Ostercappeln
  - 5474 Stemwede-Dielingen (Gemeinde Stemwede)
  - 5475 Hunteburg
  - 5476 Venne
- 548
  - 5481 Lengerich (Westfalen)
  - 5482 Tecklenburg
  - 5483 Lienen
  - 5484 Kattenvenne
  - 5485 Ladbergen
- 549
  - 5491 Damme (Dümmer)
  - 5492 Steinfeld (Oldenburg)
  - 5493 Neuenkirchen (Old.)
  - 5494 Holdorf (Nieders.)
  - 5495 Vörden

=== 55 – Göttingen and surroundings ===
- 550
  - 5502 Dransfeld
  - 5503 Nörten-Hardenberg
  - 5504 Friedland (bei Göttingen)
  - 5505 Hardegsen
  - 5506 Adelebsen
  - 5507 Ebergötzen
  - 5508 Rittmarshausen
  - 5509 Rosdorf
- 551 Göttingen
- 552
  - 5520 Braunlage
  - 5521 Herzberg am Harz
  - 5522 Osterode (Harz)
  - 5523 Bad Sachsa
  - 5524 Bad Lauterberg (Harz)
  - 5525 Walkenried
  - 5527 Duderstadt
  - 5528 Gieboldehausen
  - 5529 Rhumspringe
- 553
  - 5531 Holzminden
  - 5532 Stadtoldendorf
  - 5533 Bodenwerder
  - 5534 Eschershausen (an der Lenne) (Niedersachsen)
  - 5535 Polle
  - 5536 Neuhaus (bei Holzminden)
- 554
  - 5541 Hann. Münden
  - 5542 Witzenhausen
  - 5543 Staufenberg (Niedersachsen)
  - 5544 Reinhardshagen
  - 5545 Hedemünden
  - 5546 Scheden
- 555
  - 5551 Northeim
  - 5552 Katlenburg
  - 5553 Kalefeld
  - 5554 Moringen
  - 5555 Fredelsloh
  - 5556 Lindau (Harz)
- 556
  - 5561 Einbeck
  - 5562 Markoldendorf
  - 5563 Kreiensen
  - 5564 Dassel
  - 5565 Wenzen
- 557
  - 5571 Uslar
  - 5572 Bodenfelde
  - 5573 Volpriehausen
  - 5574 Oberweser
- 558
  - 5582 Sankt Andreasberg
  - 5583 Hohegeiß
  - 5584 Hattorf
  - 5585 Sieber
- 559
  - 5592 Gleichen-Bremke
  - 5593 Lenglern (bei Bovenden)
  - 5594 Reyershausen

=== 56 – Kassel and surroundings ===
- 560
  - 5601 Schauenburg
  - 5602 Hessisch Lichtenau and Eschenstruth
  - 5603 Gudensberg
  - 5604 Großalmerode
  - 5605 Kaufungen
  - 5606 Zierenberg
  - 5607 Fuldatal
  - 5608 Söhrewald
  - 5609 Ahnatal
- 561 Kassel
- 562
  - 5621 Bad Wildungen
  - 5622 Fritzlar
  - 5623 Edertal
  - 5624 Emstal
  - 5625 Naumburg (Hessen)
  - 5626 Zwesten
- 563
  - 5631 Korbach
  - 5632 Willingen (Upland)
  - 5633 Diemelsee
  - 5634 Waldeck
  - 5635 Voehl
  - 5636 Lichtenfels-Goddelsheim
- 564
  - 5641 Warburg
  - 5642 Scherfede
  - 5643 Borgentreich
  - 5644 Peckelsheim
  - 5645 Borgholz (bei Borgentreich)
  - 5646 Willebadessen
  - 5647 Kleinenberg
  - 5648 Gehrden
- 565
  - 5650 Cornberg
  - 5651 Eschwege
  - 5652 Bad Sooden-Allendorf
  - 5653 Sontra
  - 5654 Herleshausen
  - 5655 Wanfried
  - 5656 Waldkappel
  - 5657 Meißner
  - 5658 Wehretal
  - 5659 Ringgau
- 566
  - 5661 Melsungen
  - 5662 Felsberg (Hessen)
  - 5663 Spangenberg
  - 5664 Morschen
  - 5665 Guxhagen
- 567
  - 5671 Hofgeismar
  - 5672 Bad Karlshafen
  - 5673 Immenhausen (Hessen)
  - 5674 Grebenstein
  - 5675 Trendelburg
  - 5676 Liebenau (Hessen)
  - 5677 Calden-Westuffeln
- 568
  - 5681 Homberg (Efze)
  - 5682 Borken (Hessen)
  - 5683 Wabern (Hessen)
  - 5684 Frielendorf
  - 5685 Knüllwald
  - 5686 Schwarzenborn
- 569
  - 5691 Bad Arolsen
  - 5692 Wolfhagen
  - 5693 Volkmarsen
  - 5694 Diemelstadt
  - 5695 Twistetal
  - 5696 Landau (bei Arolsen)

=== 57 – Minden and surroundings ===
- 570
  - 5702 Lahde (Stadt Petershagen)
  - 5703 Hille
  - 5704 Friedewalde (Stadt Petershagen)
  - 5705 Windheim (Stadt Petershagen)
  - 5706 Porta Westfalica
  - 5707 Petershagen
- 571 Minden
- 572
  - 5721 Stadthagen
  - 5722 Bückeburg
  - 5723 Bad Nenndorf
  - 5724 Obernkirchen
  - 5725 Lindhorst (bei Stadthagen)
  - 5726 Wiedensahl
- 573
  - 5731 Bad Oeynhausen
  - 5732 Löhne
  - 5733 Vlotho
  - 5734 Bergkirchen (Westfalen) (Stadt Bad Oeynhausen)
- 574
  - 5741 Lübbecke
  - 5742 Preußisch Oldendorf
  - 5743 Gestringen (Stadt Espelkamp)
  - 5744 Hüllhorst
  - 5745 Levern (Gemeinde Stemwede)
  - 5746 Rödinghausen
- 575
  - 5751 Rinteln
  - 5752 Hattendorf
  - 5753 Bernsen
  - 5754 Bremke (Gemeinde Extertal)
  - 5755 Varenholz (Gemeinde Kalletal)
- 576
  - 5761 Stolzenau
  - 5764 Steyerberg
  - 5765 Raddestorf
  - 5766 Loccum
  - 5767 Warmsen
  - 5768 Heimsen (Stadt Petershagen)
  - 5769 Voigtei
- 577
  - 5771 Rahden (Westfalen)
  - 5772 Espelkamp
  - 5773 Wehdem (Gemeinde Stemwede)
  - 5774 Ströhen
  - 5775 Diepenau
  - 5776 Preußisch Ströhen (Stadt Rahden)
  - 5777 Essern

=== 58 – Uelzen and surroundings ===
- 580
  - 5802 Wrestedt
  - 5803 Rosche
  - 5804 Rätzlingen
  - 5805 Oetzen
  - 5806 Barum
  - 5807 Altenmedingen
- 581 Uelzen
- 582
  - 5820 Suhlendorf
  - 5821 Bad Bevensen
  - 5822 Ebstorf
  - 5823 Bienenbüttel
  - 5824 Bad Bodenteich
  - 5825 Wieren
  - 5826 Suderburg
  - 5827 Unterlüß
  - 5828 Himbergen
  - 5829 Wriedel
- 583
  - 5831 Wittingen
  - 5832 Hankensbüttel
  - 5833 Brome
  - 5834 Knesebeck
  - 5835 Wahrenholz
  - 5836 Radenbeck
  - 5837 Sprakensehl
  - 5838 Groß Oesingen
  - 5839 Ohrdorf
- 584
  - 5840 Schnackenburg
  - 5841 Lüchow
  - 5842 Schnega
  - 5843 Wustrow (Wendland)
  - 5844 Clenze
  - 5845 Bergen an der Dumme
  - 5846 Gartow
  - 5848 Trebel
  - 5849 Waddeweitz
- 585
  - 5850 Neetze
  - 5851 Dahlenburg
  - 5852 Bleckede
  - 5853 Neu Darchau
  - 5854 Barskamp
  - 5855 Nahrendorf
  - 5857 Brackede
  - 5858 Wietzetze
  - 5859 Thomasburg
- 586
  - 5861 Dannenberg (Elbe)
  - 5862 Hitzacker
  - 5863 Zernien
  - 5864 Jameln
  - 5865 Gusborn
- 587
  - 5872 Stötze
  - 5874 Soltendieck
  - 5875 Emmendorf
- 588
  - 5882 Gorleben
  - 5883 Lemgow

=== 59 – Lingen (Ems) and surroundings ===
- 590
  - 5901 Fürstenau
  - 5902 Freren
  - 5903 Emsbüren
  - 5904 Lengerich (Emsland)
  - 5905 Beesten
  - 5906 Lünne
  - 5907 Geeste
  - 5908 Lohne (Kreis Nordhorn)
  - 5909 Wettrup
- 591 Lingen (Ems)
- 592
  - 5921 Nordhorn
  - 5922 Bad Bentheim
  - 5923 Schüttorf
  - 5924 Gildehaus
  - 5925 Wietmarschen
  - 5926 Engden
- 593
  - 5931 Meppen
  - 5932 Haren (Ems)
  - 5933 Lathen
  - 5934 Rütenbrock
  - 5935 Schöninghsdorf
  - 5936 Twist
  - 5937 Groß Hesepe
  - 5939 Sustrum
- 594
  - 5941 Neuenhaus (Dinkel)
  - 5942 Uelsen
  - 5943 Emlichheim
  - 5944 Hoogstede
  - 5946 Georgsdorf
  - 5947 Laar (Vechte)
  - 5948 Itterbeck
- 595
  - 5951 Werlte
  - 5952 Sögel
  - 5954 Lorup
  - 5955 Esterwegen
  - 5956 Rastdorf
  - 5957 Lindern (Old.)
- 596
  - 5961 Haselünne
  - 5962 Herzlake
  - 5963 Bawinkel
  - 5964 Lähden
  - 5965 Klein Berßen
  - 5966 Apeldorn
- 597
  - 5971 Rheine
  - 5973 Neuenkirchen (Kreis Steinfurt)
  - 5975 Mesum
  - 5976 Salzbergen
  - 5977 Spelle
  - 5978 Dreierwalde

== 6 ==
=== 60 – Northern and eastern surrounding of Frankfurt am Main ===
- 600
  - 6002 Ober-Mörlen
  - 6003 Rosbach v.d. Höhe
  - 6004 Lich-Eberstadt
  - 6007 Rosbach-Rodheim, Friedrichsdorf-Burgholzhausen
  - 6008 Echzell
- 602
  - 6020 Heigenbrücken
  - 6021 Aschaffenburg
  - 6022 Obernburg
  - 6023 Alzenau
  - 6024 Schöllkrippen, Kahlgrund
  - 6026 Großostheim
  - 6027 Stockstadt, Kleinostheim
  - 6028 Niedernberg, Sulzbach
  - 6029 Mömbris, Johannesberg
- 603
  - 6031 Friedberg (Hessen)
  - 6032 Bad Nauheim
  - 6033 Butzbach
  - 6034 Wöllstadt, Niddatal, Karben-Burg-Gräfenrode
  - 6035 Florstadt, Reichelsheim (Wetterau)
  - 6036 Wölfersheim
  - 6039 Karben
- 604
  - 6041 Glauburg
  - 6042 Büdingen
  - 6043 Nidda
  - 6044 Schotten
  - 6045 Gedern
  - 6046 Ortenberg
  - 6047 Altenstadt (Hessen)
  - 6048 Büdingen-Eckartshausen
  - 6049 Kefenrod
- 605
  - 6050 Biebergemünd
  - 6051 Gelnhausen, Linsengericht
  - 6052 Bad Orb
  - 6053 Wächtersbach
  - 6054 Birstein, Brachttal
  - 6055 Freigericht, Hasselroth
  - 6056 Bad Soden-Salmünster
  - 6057 Flörsbachtal
  - 6058 Gründau
  - 6059 Jossgrund
- 606
  - 6061 Michelstadt
  - 6062 Erbach (Odenwald)
  - 6063 Bad König
  - 6066 Michelstadt-Vielbrunn
  - 6068 Beerfelden
- 607
  - 6071 Dieburg
  - 6073 Babenhausen
  - 6074 Rödermark, Dietzenbach
  - 6078 Groß-Umstadt
- 608
  - 6081 Usingen, Neu-Anspach, Wehrheim
  - 6082 Niederreifenberg
  - 6083 Weilrod
  - 6084 Schmitten
  - 6085 Waldsolms
  - 6086 Grävenwiesbach
  - 6087 Waldems
- 609
  - 6092 Heimbuchenthal
  - 6093 Laufach
  - 6094 Weibersbrunn
  - 6095 Bessenbach
  - 6096 Wiesen (Unterfranken)

=== 61 – Rhine-Main Area, Southern Hesse ===
- 610
  - 6101 Bad Vilbel, Niederdorfelden, Frankfurt-Nieder-Erlenbach, Frankfurt-Harheim
  - 6102 Neu-Isenburg
  - 6103 Langen, Egelsbach
  - 6104 Heusenstamm, Obertshausen
  - 6105 Mörfelden-Walldorf
  - 6106 Rodgau, Heusenstamm
  - 6107 Kelsterbach
  - 6108 Mühlheim am Main
  - 6109 Frankfurt-Bergen-Enkheim
- 611 Wiesbaden
- 612
  - 6120 Aarbergen, Hohenstein
  - 6122 Hofheim-Wallau
  - 6123 Eltville, Walluf
  - 6124 Bad Schwalbach
  - 6126 Idstein
  - 6127 Niedernhausen
  - 6128 Taunusstein
  - 6129 Schlangenbad
- 613
  - 6130 Schwabenheim an der Selz
  - 6131 Mainz
  - 6132 Ingelheim am Rhein
  - 6133 Nierstein, Oppenheim
  - 6134 Mainz-Kastel
  - 6135 Bodenheim
  - 6136 Nieder-Olm
  - 6138 Mommenheim
  - 6139 Budenheim
- 614
  - 6142 Rüsselsheim, Raunheim
  - 6144 Bischofsheim (Mainspitze)
  - 6145 Flörsheim am Main
  - 6146 Hochheim am Main
  - 6147 Trebur
- 615
  - 6150 Weiterstadt, Erzhausen, Darmstadt-Wixhausen
  - 6151 Darmstadt
  - 6152 Groß-Gerau, Büttelborn
  - 6154 Ober-Ramstadt
  - 6155 Griesheim
  - 6157 Pfungstadt
  - 6158 Riedstadt
  - 6159 Messel
- 616
  - 6161 Brensbach
  - 6162 Groß-Bieberau, Reinheim
  - 6163 Höchst im Odenwald
  - 6164 Reichelsheim (Odenwald)
  - 6165 Breuberg
  - 6166 Fischbachtal
  - 6167 Modautal
- 617
  - 6171 Oberursel
  - 6172 Bad Homburg
  - 6173 Kronberg im Taunus
  - 6174 Königstein im Taunus
  - 6175 Friedrichsdorf (Taunus)
- 618
  - 6181 Hanau
  - 6182 Seligenstadt
  - 6183 Erlensee
  - 6184 Langenselbold, Rodenbach (bei Hanau)
  - 6185 Hammersbach (Hessen)
  - 6186 Großkrotzenburg
  - 6187 Nidderau, Schöneck (Hessen)
  - 6188 Kahl am Main, Karlstein am Main
- 619
  - 6190 Hattersheim am Main
  - 6192 Hofheim am Taunus, Kriftel
  - 6195 Kelkheim
  - 6196 Bad Soden am Taunus, Eschborn, Liederbach am Taunus, Schwalbach am Taunus, Sulzbach
  - 6198 Eppstein

=== 62 – Rhine-Neckar ===
- 620
  - 6201 Birkenau, Gorxheimertal, Hemsbach, Hirschberg an der Bergstraße, Laudenbach, Weinheim
  - 6202 Brühl, Ketsch, Oftersheim, Plankstadt, Schwetzingen
  - 6203 Edingen-Neckarhausen, Heddesheim, Ladenburg, Schriesheim
  - 6204 Viernheim
  - 6205 Altlußheim, Hockenheim, Neulußheim, Reilingen
  - 6206 Bürstadt, Lampertheim
  - 6207 Wald-Michelbach
  - 6209 Mörlenbach
- 621 Mannheim, Ilvesheim, Neu-Edingen
- 621 Ludwigshafen am Rhein
- 622
  - 6220 Heiligkreuzsteinach, Wilhelmsfeld
  - 6221 Heidelberg, Dossenheim, Eppelheim
  - 6222 Dielheim, Mühlhausen, Rauenberg, Wiesloch
  - 6223 Bammental, Gaiberg, Neckargemünd, Wiesenbach
  - 6224 Leimen, Nußloch, Sandhausen
  - 6226 Eschelbronn, Lobbach, Mauer, Meckesheim, Spechbach, Zuzenhausen
  - 6227 St. Leon-Rot, Walldorf
  - 6228 Schönau
  - 6229 Neckarsteinach
- 623
  - 6231 Hochdorf-Assenheim
  - 6232 Speyer
  - 6233 Frankenthal
  - 6234 Mutterstadt
  - 6235 Schifferstadt
  - 6236 Limburgerhof, Neuhofen
  - 6237 Ludwigshafen-Ruchheim, Maxdorf
  - 6238 Gerolsheim
  - 6239 Bobenheim-Roxheim
- 624
  - 6241 Worms
  - 6242 Worms-Abenheim
  - 6243 Monsheim
  - 6244 Gundersheim
  - 6245 Biblis
  - 6246 Eich (Rheinhessen), Hamm am Rhein, Ibersheim
  - 6247 Worms-Pfeddersheim
- 625
  - 6251 Bensheim
  - 6252 Heppenheim
  - 6253 Fürth
  - 6254 Lautertal
  - 6255 Lindenfels
  - 6256 Lampertheim-Hüttenfeld
  - 6257 Seeheim-Jugenheim
  - 6258 Gernsheim
- 626
  - 6261 Elztal, Mosbach, Neckarzimmern, Obrigheim
  - 6262 Aglasterhausen, Neunkirchen, Reichartshausen, Schönbrunn, Schwarzach
  - 6263 Neckargerach, Binau
  - 6264 Neudenau
  - 6265 Billigheim
  - 6266 Haßmersheim
  - 6267 Fahrenbach
  - 6268 Hüffenhardt
- 627
  - 6271 Eberbach
  - 6272 Hirschhorn (Neckar)
  - 6274 Waldbrunn
  - 6275 Rothenberg
  - 6276 Hesseneck
- 628
  - 6281 Buchen (Odenwald)
  - 6282 Walldürn
  - 6283 Hardheim, Höpfingen
  - 6284 Mudau
  - 6285 Walldürn-Altheim
  - 6286 Walldürn-Rippberg
  - 6287 Limbach
- 629
  - 6291 Adelsheim, Osterburken
  - 6292 Seckach
  - 6293 Schefflenz
  - 6295 Rosenberg
  - 6297 Ravenstein
  - 6298 Möckmühl

=== 63 – Palatine ===
- 630
  - 6301 Otterbach
  - 6302 Winnweiler
  - 6303 Enkenbach-Alsenborn, Mehlingen
  - 6307 Geiselberg, Krickenbach, Linden, Schmalenberg, Schopp
- 631 Kaiserslautern
- 632
  - 6321 Neustadt an der Weinstraße
  - 6322 Bad Dürkheim
  - 6323 Edenkoben, Edesheim, Flemlingen, Großfischlingen, Hainfeld (Pfalz), Rhodt unter Rietburg, Roschbach, Sankt Martin (Pfalz), Venningen, Weyher in der Pfalz
  - 6327 Lachen-Speyerdorf
- 633
  - 6331 Höheischweiler, Pirmasens
  - 6332 Zweibrücken
  - 6333 Clausen, Donsieders, Heltersberg, Hermersberg, Höheinöd, Horbach, Steinalben, Waldfischbach-Burgalben, Weselberg
  - 6334 Höhfröschen, Maßweiler, Petersberg, Thaleischweiler-Fröschen
  - 6336 Nünschweiler, Rieschweiler-Mühlbach
- 634
  - 6340 Dierbach, Freckenfeld, Kapsweyer, Niederotterbach, Steinfeld (Pfalz), Vollmersweiler, Wörth-Schaidt
  - 6341 Landau in der Pfalz
  - 6342 Schweigen-Rechtenbach
  - 6343 Bad Bergzabern
  - 6344 Schwegenheim
  - 6345 Albersweiler
  - 6346 Annweiler am Trifels
  - 6347 Hochstadt (Pfalz)
  - 6348 Offenbach an der Queich
  - 6349 Billigheim-Ingenheim
- 635
  - 6351 Eisenberg, Göllheim
  - 6352 Kirchheimbolanden
  - 6353 Freinsheim, Weisenheim am Sand, Dackenheim, Bobenheim am Berg, Erpolzheim, Herxheim am Berg, Weisenheim am Berg
  - 6359 Grünstadt
- 637
  - 6371 Landstuhl, Obernheim-Kirchenarnbach
  - 6372 Bruchmühlbach-Miesau
  - 6373 Waldmohr, Schönenberg-Kübelberg
  - 6374 Weilerbach
  - 6375 Biedershausen, Herschberg, Hettenhausen, Knopp-Labach, Reifenberg, Saalstadt, Schauerberg, Schmitshausen, Wallhalben
  - 6385 Reichenbach-Steegen, Albersbach

=== 64 – Central Hesse ===
- 640
  - 6400 Mücke
  - 6401 Grünberg
  - 6403 Langgöns, Linden
  - 6404 Fernwald, Lich
  - 6405 Laubach
  - 6406 Lollar, Staufenberg
  - 6407 Rabenau
  - 6408 Buseck, Reiskirchen
  - 6409 Biebertal
- 641 Gießen, Heuchelheim (Hessen)
- 642
  - 6420 Lahntal (partially)
  - 6421 Marburg, Weimar (Lahn) (partially), Cölbe (partially)
  - 6422 Kirchhain, Amöneburg
  - 6423 Wetter, Lahntal (partially), Münchhausen (partially)
  - 6424 Ebsdorfergrund
  - 6425 Rauschenberg
  - 6426 Weimar (Lahn) (partially), Fronhausen
  - 6427 Cölbe (partially)
  - 6428 Stadtallendorf (partially)
  - 6429 Stadtallendorf (partially)
- 643
  - 6431 Limburg an der Lahn and Parts of Runkel
  - 6432 Diez
  - 6433 Hadamar
  - 6434 Bad Camberg
  - 6435 Wallmerod
  - 6436 Dornburg (Hessen)
  - 6438 Hünfelden
  - 6439 Holzappel
- 644
  - 6441 Wetzlar
  - 6442 Braunfels
  - 6443 Ehringshausen
  - 6444 Bischoffen
  - 6445 Schöffengrund
  - 6446 Hohenahr
  - 6447 Langgöns-Niederkleen
  - 6449 Ehringshausen-Katzenfurt
- 645
  - 6451 Frankenberg (Eder)
  - 6452 Battenberg
  - 6454 Wohratal
  - 6457 Burgwald, Münchhausen (partially)
- 646
  - 6461 Biedenkopf
  - 6462 Gladenbach, Lohra
  - 6464 Angelburg, Steffenberg
  - 6465 Breidenbach
  - 6466 Dautphetal (partially)
  - 6467 Hatzfeld (Eder)
  - 6468 Dautphetal (partially)
- 647
  - 6471 Weilburg an der Lahn
  - 6472 Weilmünster
  - 6473 Leun
  - 6474 Villmar
  - 6476 Mengerskirchen
  - 6477 Greifenstein-Nenderoth
  - 6478 Greifenstein-Ulm
  - 6479 Waldbrunn (Westerwald)
- 648
  - 6482 Runkel
  - 6483 Selters (Taunus)
  - 6484 Beselich
  - 6485 Nentershausen
  - 6486 Katzenelnbogen

=== 65 – Moselle, Eifel, Hunsrück ===
- 650
  - 6501 Konz
  - 6502 Schweich
- 651 Trier
- 653
  - 6531 Bernkastel-Kues
  - 6533 Morbach
  - 6535 Maring-Noviand, Osann-Monzel
- 654
  - 6541 Traben-Trarbach
  - 6544 Rhaunen
- 655
  - 6551 Prüm
- 656
  - 6561 Bitburg
- 657
  - 6571 Wittlich
- 658
  - 6581 Saarburg
  - 6588 Pluwig
- 659
  - 6591 Gerolstein
  - 6592 Daun

=== 66 – Greater Fulda, Eastern Hesse ===
- 661 Fulda, Künzell, Petersberg
- 662
  - 6622 Bebra
  - 6627 Nentershausen
- 664
  - 6641 Lauterbach (Hessen)
  - 6642 Schlitz
  - 6643 Herbstein, Lautertal
  - 6644 Grebenhain
  - 6645 Ulrichstein
  - 6647 Herbstein-Stockhausen
  - 6648 Bad Salzschlirf, Großenlüder
- 665
  - 6656 Ebersburg
  - 6657 Hofbieber
  - 6658 Poppenhausen (Wasserkuppe)
- 666
  - 6661 Schlüchtern
- 669
  - 6691 Schwalmstadt
  - 6692 Neustadt
  - 6693 Neuental
  - 6694 Neukirchen
  - 6695 Jesberg
  - 6696 Gilserberg
  - 6697 Willingshausen
  - 6698 Alsfeld

=== 67 – Rhenish Hesse, Eastern Hunsrück ===
- 671 Bad Kreuznach
- 672
  - 6721 Bingen
  - 6722 Rüdesheim, Geisenheim, Johannisberg, Marienthal, Stephanshausen, Aulhausen, Assmannshausen
  - 6723 Oestrich-Winkel, Mittelheim
  - 6724 Stromberg Hunsrück
  - 6725 Gau-Algesheim
  - 6726 Lorch (Rheingau)
  - 6727 Gensingen
  - 6728 Ober-Hilbersheim
- 673
  - 6731 Alzey
  - 6732 Udenheim
  - 6733 Gau-Odernheim
- 674
  - 6741 Sankt Goar
  - 6744 Oberwesel
  - 6746 Pfalzfeld
  - 6747 Emmelshausen
- 675
  - 6751 Bad Sobernheim
  - 6752 Kirn
  - 6753 Odenbach, Meisenheim
  - 6754 Martinstein
  - 6755 Odernheim am Glan
  - 6756 Winterbach (Soonwald)
  - 6757 Becherbach bei Kirn
  - 6758 Waldböckelheim
- 676
  - 6761 Simmern (Hunsrück)
- 677
  - 6771 Sankt Goarshausen
- 678
  - 6781 Idar-Oberstein
  - 6783 Baumholder
  - 6784 Idar-Oberstein (East)

=== 68 – Saarland ===
- 680
  - 6802 Völklingen-Lauterbach
  - 6803 Mandelbachtal-Ommersheim
  - 6804 Mandelbachtal
  - 6805 Kleinblittersdorf
  - 6806 Heusweiler, Riegelsberg
  - 6809 Großrosseln
- 681 Saarbrücken
- 682
  - 6821 Neunkirchen (Saar)
  - 6824 Ottweiler
  - 6825 Illingen (Saar)
  - 6826 Bexbach
  - 6827 Eppelborn
- 683
  - 6831 Saarlouis, Dillingen
  - 6832 Beckingen-Reimsbach
  - 6833 Rehlingen-Siersburg
  - 6834 Wadgassen
  - 6835 Beckingen
  - 6836 Überherrn
  - 6837 Wallerfangen
  - 6838 Saarwellingen
- 684
  - 6841 Homburg (Saar)
  - 6842 Blieskastel
  - 6844 Blieskastel-Altheim
  - 6848 Homburg-Einöd
  - 6849 Kirkel
- 685
  - 6851 St. Wendel
  - 6852
  - 6853 Marpingen
  - 6855 Freisen
  - 6857 Namborn
- 686
  - 6861 Merzig
  - 6864 Mettlach
- 687
  - 6871 Wadern
  - 6872 Losheim am See
  - 6876 Weiskirchen
- 688
  - 6881 Lebach, Eppelborn
  - 6887 Schmelz (Saar)
  - 6888 Lebach-Steinbach
- 689
  - 6893 Saarbrücken-Ensheim
  - 6894 St. Ingbert
  - 6897 Dudweiler, Sulzbach
  - 6898 Völklingen

=== 69 – Frankfurt am Main, Offenbach am Main ===
- 69 Frankfurt am Main, Offenbach am Main

== 7 ==
=== 70x/071 – Stuttgart and surroundings ===
- 700 personal numbers
- 701 personal numbers, reserved
- 702
  - 7021 Kirchheim unter Teck, Dettingen unter Teck, Notzingen, Owen, Schlierbach
  - 7022 Nürtingen, Frickenhausen, Großbettlingen, Oberboihingen, Unterensingen, Wolfschlugen
  - 7023 Weilheim an der Teck, Bissingen an der Teck, Holzmaden, Neidlingen, Ohmden
  - 7024 Wendlingen am Neckar, Köngen
  - 7025 Neuffen, Beuren, Frickenhausen-Linsenhofen, Kohlberg
  - 7026 Lenningen, Erkenbrechtsweiler
- 703
  - 7031 Böblingen, Altdorf, Holzgerlingen, Schönaich, Sindelfingen
  - 7032 Herrenberg, Ammerbuch, Gäufelden, Jettingen, Nufringen
  - 7033 Weil der Stadt, Grafenau, Heimsheim, Ostelsheim, Simmozheim
  - 7034 Ehningen, Aidlingen, Gärtringen, Hildrizhausen
- 704
  - 7041 Mühlacker, Ötisheim, Wiernsheim
  - 7042 Vaihingen an der Enz, Eberdingen, Illingen, Mühlacker, Oberriexingen, Sersheim
  - 7043 Maulbronn, Illingen, Knittlingen, Ölbronn-Dürrn, Sternenfels
  - 7044 Mönsheim, Friolzheim, Heimsheim, Weissach, Wiernsheim, Wimsheim, Wurmberg
  - 7045 Oberderdingen, Sternenfels
  - 7046 Zaberfeld, Pfaffenhofen, Sachsenheim
- 705
  - 7051 Calw, Althengstett, Bad Teinach-Zavelstein, Oberreichenbach
  - 7052 Bad Liebenzell
  - 7053 Bad Teinach-Zavelstein, Calw, Neubulach, Oberreichenbach
  - 7054 Wildberg, Ebhausen
  - 7055 Neuweiler, Bad Wildbad, Neubulach
  - 7056 Gechingen, Aidlingen, Deckenpfronn, Wildberg
- 706
  - 7062 Beilstein, Abstatt, Ilsfeld, Neckarwestheim, Oberstenfeld
  - 7063 Bad Wimpfen
  - 7066 Bad Rappenau, Heilbronn
- 707
  - 7071 Tübingen, Kusterdingen
  - 7072 Gomaringen, Dußlingen, Kusterdingen-Immenhausen, Reutlingen-Bronnweiler, Reutlingen-Gönningen
  - 7073 Ammerbuch, Rottenburg am Neckar, Tübingen-Unterjesingen
- 708
  - 7081 Bad Wildbad, Dobel, Höfen an der Enz
  - 7082 Neuenbürg, Birkenfeld, Engelsbrand, Keltern, Straubenhardt
  - 7083 Bad Herrenalb, Dobel, Loffenau
  - 7084 Schömberg im Schwarzwald, Bad Liebenzell, Oberreichenbach
  - 7085 Enzklösterle, Bad Wildbad
- 709 (not assigned)
- 710 (not assigned)
- 711 Stuttgart, Aichwald, Denkendorf, Esslingen am Neckar, Fellbach, Filderstadt-Bernhausen, Filderstadt-Bonlanden, Filderstadt-Plattenhardt, Korntal, Leinfelden-Echterdingen, Ostfildern-Kemnat, Ostfildern-Nellingen, Ostfildern-Ruit
- 712
  - 7121 Reutlingen, Eningen unter Achalm, Kirchentellinsfurt, Pfullingen, Wannweil
  - 7122 St. Johann, Lichtenstein
  - 7123 Metzingen, Bempflingen, Dettingen an der Erms, Frickenhausen-Tischardt, Grafenberg, Neuffen-Kappishäusern, Riederich
  - 7124 Trochtelfingen, Burladingen-Hörschwag, Gammertingen
  - 7125 Bad Urach, Hülben
  - 7126 Burladingen-Melchingen, Burladingen-Salmendingen, Burladingen-Stetten
  - 7127 Neckartenzlingen, Aichtal, Altdorf, Altenriet, Neckartailfingen, Pliezhausen, Reutlingen-Mittelstadt, Schlaitdorf, Walddorfhäslach
  - 7128 Sonnenbühl
  - 7129 Lichtenstein, Engstingen
- 713
  - 7130 Löwenstein, Beilstein, Obersulm, Untergruppenbach, Wüstenrot
  - 7131 Heilbronn, Flein, Leingarten, Untergruppenbach
  - 7132 Neckarsulm, Erlenbach, Oedheim, Untereisesheim
  - 7133 Lauffen am Neckar, Ilsfeld, Neckarwestheim, Nordheim, Talheim
  - 7134 Weinsberg, Eberstadt, Ellhofen, Lehrensteinsfeld, Obersulm
  - 7135 Brackenheim, Cleebronn, Güglingen, Nordheim
  - 7136 Bad Friedrichshall, Gundelsheim, Oedheim, Offenau
  - 7138 Schwaigern, Eppingen, Massenbachhausen
  - 7139 Hardthausen am Kocher, Langenbrettach, Neuenstadt am Kocher, Oedheim
- 714
  - 7141 Ludwigsburg, Asperg, Freiberg am Neckar, Kornwestheim, Möglingen, Remseck am Neckar, Tamm
  - 7142 Bietigheim-Bissingen, Ingersheim
  - 7143 Besigheim, Bönnigheim, Erligheim, Freudental, Gemmrigheim, Hessigheim, Kirchheim am Neckar, Löchgau, Mundelsheim, Walheim
  - 7144 Marbach am Neckar, Affalterbach, Benningen am Neckar, Erdmannhausen, Kirchberg an der Murr, Ludwigsburg, Murr, Pleidelsheim, Steinheim an der Murr
  - 7145 Markgröningen
  - 7146 Remseck am Neckar, Waiblingen
  - 7147 Sachsenheim, Bietigheim-Bissingen, Markgröningen
  - 7148 Großbottwar, Aspach, Steinheim an der Murr
- 715
  - 7150 Münchingen, Hemmingen, Schwieberdingen
  - 7151 Waiblingen, Kernen im Remstal, Korb, Remshalden, Weinstadt
  - 7152 Leonberg, Ditzingen, Rutesheim
  - 7153 Plochingen, Altbach, Baltmannsweiler, Deizisau, Hochdorf, Lichtenwald, Reichenbach an der Fils, Wernau
  - 7154 Kornwestheim
  - 7156 Ditzingen, Gerlingen
  - 7157 Waldenbuch, Dettenhausen, Steinenbronn, Weil im Schönbuch
  - 7158 Neuhausen auf den Fildern, Filderstadt-Harthausen, Filderstadt-Sielmingen, Ostfildern-Scharnhausen
  - 7159 Renningen, Magstadt
- 716
  - 7161 Göppingen, Albershausen, Birenbach, Börtlingen, Eislingen/Fils, Eschenbach, Heiningen, Rechberghausen, Schlat, Uhingen, Wangen
  - 7162 Süßen, Donzdorf, Gingen an der Fils, Salach, Waldstetten
  - 7163 Ebersbach an der Fils, Uhingen
  - 7164 Boll, Aichelberg, Dürnau, Gammelshausen, Hattenhofen, Zell unter Aichelberg
  - 7165 Göppingen-Hohenstaufen, Eislingen/Fils, Göppingen-Hohrein, Ottenbach
  - 7166 Adelberg
- 717
  - 7171 Schwäbisch Gmünd, Alfdorf-Adelstetten, Mutlangen, Waldstetten
  - 7172 Lorch, Adelberg, Alfdorf, Börtlingen, Wäschenbeuren
  - 7173 Heubach, Bartholomä, Böbingen an der Rems, Schwäbisch Gmünd-Bargau
  - 7174 Mögglingen, Heuchlingen
  - 7175 Leinzell, Eschach, Göggingen, Iggingen, Schechingen, Täferrot
  - 7176 Spraitbach, Alfdorf, Durlangen, Ruppertshofen, Täferrot
- 718
  - 7181 Schorndorf, Berglen, Plüderhausen, Remshalden, Urbach, Winterbach
  - 7182 Welzheim, Alfdorf, Kaisersbach, Plüderhausen
  - 7183 Rudersberg, Althütte
  - 7184 Kaisersbach, Murrhardt
- 719
  - 7191 Backnang, Allmersbach im Tal, Aspach, Auenwald, Burgstetten, Oppenweiler, Weissach im Tal
  - 7192 Murrhardt, Althütte, Auenwald, Großerlach
  - 7193 Sulzbach an der Murr, Großerlach, Oppenweiler
  - 7194 Spiegelberg, Oberstenfeld, Wüstenrot
  - 7195 Winnenden, Berglen, Leutenbach, Schwaikheim

=== 72 – Karlsruhe and surroundings ===
- 720
  - 7202 Karlsbad
  - 7203 Walzbachtal
  - 7204 Malsch-Völkersbach, Gaggenau, Malsch
- 721 Karlsruhe, Eggenstein-Leopoldshafen, Pfinztal-Berghausen (Baden), Rheinstetten, Stutensee,
- 722
  - 7220 Forbach, Ottersweier
  - 7221 Baden-Baden, Sinzheim
  - 7222 Rastatt, Bischweier, Gaggenau, Kuppenheim, Muggensturm, Ötigheim, Steinmauern
  - 7223 Bühl, Baden-Baden, Bühlertal, Ottersweier, Sinzheim
  - 7224 Gernsbach, Gaggenau, Weisenbach
  - 7225 Gaggenau, Kuppenheim
  - 7226 Bühl, Bühlertal, Forbach, Ottersweier, Sasbach
  - 7227 Lichtenau (Baden), Bühl, Rheinau, Rheinmünster
  - 7228 Forbach
  - 7229 Iffezheim, Hügelsheim, Rastatt
- 723
  - 7231 Pforzheim, Birkenfeld, Ispringen, Kämpfelbach, Kieselbronn
  - 7232 Königsbach-Stein, Eisingen, Kämpfelbach, Remchingen
  - 7233 Niefern-Öschelbronn
  - 7234 Tiefenbronn, Neuhausen, Pforzheim
  - 7235 Unterreichenbach, Engelsbrand, Schömberg im Schwarzwald
  - 7236 Keltern
  - 7237 Neulingen, Ölbronn-Dürrn
- 724
  - 7240 Pfinztal nur Söllingen, Kleinsteinbach and Wöschbach
  - 7242 Rheinstetten
  - 7243 Ettlingen, Waldbronn
  - 7244 Weingarten (Baden), Stutensee
  - 7245 Durmersheim, Au am Rhein, Bietigheim, Elchesheim-Illingen
  - 7246 Malsch
  - 7247 Linkenheim-Hochstetten, Dettenheim, Eggenstein-Leopoldshafen
  - 7248 Marxzell, Karlsbad-Ittersbach, Straubenhardt
  - 7249 Stutensee
- 725
  - 7250 Kraichtal
  - 7251 Bruchsal, Forst, Karlsdorf-Neuthard, Kraichtal, Ubstadt-Weiher
  - 7252 Bretten, Gondelsheim
  - 7253 Bad Schönborn, Kronau, Malsch, Mühlhausen, Östringen, Rauenberg, Ubstadt-Weiher
  - 7254 Waghäusel, Oberhausen-Rheinhausen
  - 7255 Graben-Neudorf, Dettenheim, Hambrücken
  - 7256 Philippsburg
  - 7257 Bruchsal-Untergrombach, Bruchsal
  - 7258 Oberderdingen-Flehingen, Bretten, Kraichtal, Kürnbach, Oberderdingen, Zaisenhausen
  - 7259 Östringen-Odenheim, Kraichtal, Östringen
- 726
  - 7260 Eppingen, Sinsheim
  - 7261 Sinsheim, Waibstadt
  - 7262 Eppingen
  - 7263 Waibstadt, Epfenbach, Helmstadt-Bargen, Neckarbischofsheim, Neidenstein
  - 7264 Bad Rappenau, Siegelsbach
  - 7265 Angelbachtal, Sinsheim
  - 7266 Kirchardt, Bad Rappenau, Ittlingen, Sinsheim
  - 7267 Gemmingen
  - 7268 Bad Rappenau, Neckarbischofsheim, Sinsheim
  - 7269 Sulzfeld
- 727
  - 7271 Wörth am Rhein, Jockgrim
  - 7272 Rülzheim, Bellheim, Hördt, Kuhardt, Leimersheim, Neupotz, Rheinzabern
  - 7273 Hagenbach, Berg, Neuburg am Rhein
  - 7274 Germersheim
  - 7275 Kandel, Erlenbach bei Kandel, Hatzenbühl, Minfeld
  - 7276 Herxheim bei Landau/Pfalz, Herxheimweyher
  - 7277 Wörth-Büchelberg, Scheibenhardt, Wörth am Rhein
- 728 (not assigned)
- 729 (not assigned)

=== 73 – Ulm and surroundings ===
- 730
  - 7300 Roggenburg (Bayern)
  - 7302 Pfaffenhofen an der Roth, Holzheim
  - 7303 Illertissen
  - 7304 Blaustein, Dornstadt, Ulm
  - 7305 Erbach, Hüttisheim, Oberdischingen, Ulm
  - 7306 Vöhringen, Bellenberg, Illerrieden, Weißenhorn
  - 7307 Senden, Neu-Ulm, Vöhringen
  - 7308 Nersingen, Elchingen, Neu-Ulm
  - 7309 Weißenhorn, Senden
- 731 Ulm, Blaustein, Elchingen, Neu-Ulm
- 732
  - 7321 Heidenheim an der Brenz, Nattheim
  - 7322 Giengen an der Brenz, Hermaringen
  - 7323 Gerstetten, Amstetten-Bräunisheim, Steinheim-Söhnstetten
  - 7324 Herbrechtingen, Gerstetten-Dettingen, Giengen-Hürben, Niederstotzingen-Lontal
  - 7325 Sontheim an der Brenz, Bächingen an der Brenz, Niederstotzingen
  - 7326 Neresheim, Dischingen-Frickingen, Nattheim-Auernheim
  - 7327 Dischingen, Nattheim-Fleinheim
  - 7328 Königsbronn
  - 7329 Steinheim am Albuch
- 733
  - 7331 Geislingen an der Steige, Amstetten, Bad Überkingen, Kuchen
  - 7332 Lauterstein, Böhmenkirch, Schwäbisch Gmünd-Degenfeld
  - 7333 Laichingen, Westerheim
  - 7334 Deggingen, Bad Ditzenbach, Bad Überkingen-Hausen, Bad Überkingen-Unterböhringen, Geislingen an der Steige-Aufhausen
  - 7335 Wiesensteig, Bad Ditzenbach-Gosbach, Drackenstein, Gruibingen, Hohenstadt, Mühlhausen im Täle
  - 7336 Lonsee, Amstetten – Hofstett-Emerbuch, Amstetten – Reutti, Dornstadt-Scharenstetten, Westerstetten-Hinterdenkental
  - 7337 Nellingen, Geislingen an der Steige-Aufhausen (Wannenhöfe), Merklingen
- 734
  - 7340 Neenstetten, Altheim (Alb), Ballendorf, Börslingen, Breitingen, Holzkirch, Weidenstetten
  - 7343 Buch, Unterroth
  - 7344 Blaubeuren, Berghülen, Erbach
  - 7345 Langenau, Asselfingen, Nerenstetten, Öllingen, Rammingen, Setzingen
  - 7346 Illerkirchberg, Schnürpflingen, Staig, Ulm
  - 7347 Dietenheim, Balzheim, Schwendi
  - 7348 Beimerstetten, Bernstadt, Dornstadt, Langenau, Ulm, Westerstetten
- 735
  - 7351 Biberach an der Riß, Maselheim, Mittelbiberach, Ummendorf, Warthausen
  - 7352 Ochsenhausen, Biberach an der Riß, Erlenmoos, Gutenzell-Hürbel, Maselheim, Steinhausen an der Rottum
  - 7353 Schwendi, Gutenzell-Hürbel, Maselheim, Mietingen, Wain
  - 7354 Erolzheim, Berkheim, Dettingen an der Iller, Gutenzell-Hürbel, Kirchberg an der Iller, Kirchdorf an der Iller
  - 7355 Hochdorf, Eberhardzell, Ingoldingen, Ummendorf
  - 7356 Schemmerhofen, Maselheim, Mietingen, Warthausen
  - 7357 Attenweiler, Biberach an der Riß, Grundsheim, Oberstadion, Oggelshausen, Schemmerhofen, Uttenweiler, Warthausen
  - 7358 Eberhardzell, Bad Wurzach, Ochsenhausen, Rot an der Rot, Steinhausen an der Rottum
- 736
  - 7361 Aalen, Hüttlingen, Rainau
  - 7362 Bopfingen, Kirchheim am Ries, Neresheim, Riesbürg
  - 7363 Lauchheim, Westhausen
  - 7364 Oberkochen
  - 7365 Essingen
  - 7366 Abtsgmünd, Aalen-Dewangen, Aalen-Fachsenfeld, Hüttlingen, Neuler, Schechingen-Leinweiler
  - 7367 Aalen-Ebnat, Aalen-Waldhausen, Heidenheim-Großkuchen, Neresheim-Elchingen
- 737
  - 7371 Riedlingen, Altheim (bei Riedlingen), Betzenweiler, Dürmentingen, Ertingen, Langenenslingen, Unlingen
  - 7373 Zwiefalten, Emeringen, Pfronstetten, Riedlingen
  - 7374 Uttenweiler, Alleshausen, Betzenweiler, Emerkingen, Seekirch, Unlingen
  - 7375 Obermarchtal, Ehingen (Donau), Lauterach, Rechtenstein
  - 7376 Langenenslingen
- 738
  - 7381 Münsingen, Bad Urach, Gutsbezirk Münsingen, Mehrstetten
  - 7382 Römerstein, Grabenstetten
  - 7383 Münsingen-Buttenhausen, Hayingen, Hohenstein
  - 7384 Allmendingen, Ehingen (Donau), Münsingen, Schelklingen
  - 7385 Gomadingen, Engstingen
  - 7386 Hayingen, Ehingen (Donau)
  - 7387 Hohenstein
  - 7388 Pfronstetten, Trochtelfingen
  - 7389 Heroldstatt, Gutsbezirk Münsingen
- 739
  - 7391 Ehingen (Donau), Allmendingen, Altheim (bei Ehingen), Griesingen, Öpfingen
  - 7392 Laupheim, Achstetten, Burgrieden, Ehingen (Donau), Mietingen
  - 7393 Munderkingen, Ehingen (Donau), Emerkingen, Hausen am Bussen, Oberstadion, Rottenacker, Untermarchtal, Unterstadion, Unterwachingen
  - 7394 Schelklingen, Allmendingen, Blaubeuren, Erbach
  - 7395 Ehingen-Dächingen, Ehingen (Donau)

=== 74 – Rottweil and surroundings ===
- 740
  - 7402 Fluorn-Winzeln, Dunningen, Schramberg
  - 7403 Dunningen, Eschbronn, Zimmern ob Rottweil
  - 7404 Epfendorf, Bösingen, Dietingen
- 741 Rottweil, Deißlingen, Dietingen, Villingendorf, Zimmern ob Rottweil
- 742
  - 7420 Deißlingen
  - 7422 Schramberg, Aichhalden, Hardt, Lauterbach
  - 7423 Oberndorf am Neckar, Dornhan
  - 7424 Spaichingen, Aldingen, Balgheim, Denkingen, Dürbheim, Gunningen, Hausen ob Verena, Rietheim-Weilheim
  - 7425 Trossingen, Deißlingen, Villingen-Schwenningen
  - 7426 Gosheim, Deilingen, Frittlingen, Wehingen, Wellendingen
  - 7427 Schömberg (bei Balingen), Dautmergen, Dietingen, Dormettingen, Dotternhausen, Ratshausen, Rosenfeld, Rottweil, Weilen unter den Rinnen, Zimmern unter der Burg
  - 7428 Rosenfeld, Dietingen, Geislingen
  - 7429 Egesheim, Böttingen, Bubsheim, Königsheim, Mahlstetten, Nusplingen, Reichenbach am Heuberg, Renquishausen
- 743
  - 7431 Albstadt, Bitz, Meßstetten
  - 7432 Albstadt
  - 7433 Balingen, Geislingen
  - 7434 Winterlingen, Straßberg
  - 7435 Albstadt, Balingen
  - 7436 Hausen am Tann, Meßstetten, Obernheim
- 744
  - 7440 Bad Rippoldsau-Schapbach
  - 7441 Freudenstadt
  - 7442 Baiersbronn, Freudenstadt
  - 7443 Dornstetten, Freudenstadt, Glatten, Schopfloch, Waldachtal
  - 7444 Alpirsbach, Aichhalden, Loßburg
  - 7445 Pfalzgrafenweiler, Waldachtal
  - 7446 Loßburg
  - 7447 Baiersbronn-Schwarzenberg, Baiersbronn, Seewald
  - 7448 Seewald
  - 7449 Baiersbronn-Obertal, Baiersbronn
- 745
  - 7451 Horb am Neckar
  - 7452 Nagold, Jettingen, Mötzingen, Rohrdorf
  - 7453 Altensteig, Egenhausen, Grömbach, Simmersfeld, Wörnersberg
  - 7454 Sulz am Neckar, Vöhringen
  - 7455 Dornhan, Betzweiler-Wälde
  - 7456 Haiterbach
  - 7457 Rottenburg-Ergenzingen, Bondorf, Eutingen im Gäu, Neustetten, Rottenburg am Neckar, Starzach
  - 7458 Ebhausen, Altensteig
  - 7459 Nagold-Hochdorf, Eutingen im Gäu, Nagold
- 746
  - 7461 Tuttlingen, Rietheim-Weilheim, Wurmlingen
  - 7462 Immendingen, Tuttlingen
  - 7463 Mühlheim an der Donau, Fridingen an der Donau, Kolbingen
  - 7464 Talheim, Tuttlingen, Durchhausen, Seitingen-Oberflacht, Tuningen, Tuttlingen
  - 7465 Emmingen-Liptingen, Eigeltingen
  - 7466 Beuron, Bärenthal, Irndorf, Leibertingen
  - 7467 Neuhausen ob Eck
- 747
  - 7471 Hechingen, Bisingen, Bodelshausen, Rangendingen
  - 7472 Rottenburg am Neckar, Neustetten, Starzach, Tübingen
  - 7473 Mössingen, Nehren, Ofterdingen
  - 7474 Haigerloch
  - 7475 Burladingen
  - 7476 Bisingen, Grosselfingen
  - 7477 Jungingen, Burladingen, Hechingen
  - 7478 Hirrlingen, Rangendingen, Rottenburg am Neckar, Starzach
- 748
  - 7482 Horb-Dettingen, Sulz am Neckar
  - 7483 Empfingen, Eutingen im Gäu, Horb am Neckar, Starzach
  - 7484 Simmersfeld
  - 7485 Empfingen
  - 7486 Horb am Neckar, Waldachtal
- 749 (not assigned)

=== 75 – Oberschwaben ===
- 750
  - 7502 Wolpertswende, Baindt, Fronreute
  - 7503 Wilhelmsdorf, Guggenhausen, Horgenzell
  - 7504 Horgenzell, Berg (Schussental), Ravensburg, Wilhelmsdorf
  - 7505 Fronreute, Berg (Schussental), Fleischwangen, Guggenhausen, Unterwaldhausen, Wilhelmsdorf
  - 7506 Wangen, Amtzell, Kißlegg, Vogt
- 751 Ravensburg, Baienfurt, Baindt, Berg (Schussental), Grünkraut, Schlier, Weingarten (Württemberg)
- 752
  - 7520 Bodnegg, Amtzell, Grünkraut, Ravensburg
  - 7522 Wangen im Allgäu, Amtzell, Argenbühl, Hergatz, Kißlegg
  - 7524 Bad Waldsee, Bad Wurzach, Eberhardzell
  - 7525 Aulendorf, Altshausen, Bad Schussenried, Bad Waldsee, Ebersbach-Musbach, Wolpertswende
  - 7527 Wolfegg, Bad Wurzach, Bergatreute, Vogt im Allgäu
  - 7528 Neukirch, Amtzell, Tettnang, Wangen im Allgäu
  - 7529 Waldburg, Amtzell, Schlier, Vogt im Allgäu, Wangen im Allgäu
- 753
  - 7531 Konstanz, Reichenau
  - 7532 Meersburg, Daisendorf, Hagnau am Bodensee, Immenstaad am Bodensee, Stetten
  - 7533 Allensbach, Konstanz-OT: Dettingen-Wallhausen, Dingelsdorf
  - 7534 Reichenau
- 754
  - 7541 Friedrichshafen, Eriskirch
  - 7542 Tettnang, Meckenbeuren
  - 7543 Kressbronn, Langenargen
  - 7544 Markdorf, Bermatingen, Friedrichshafen-OT: Kluftern
  - 7545 Immenstaad
  - 7546 Oberteuringen
- 755
  - 7551 Überlingen, Owingen, Sipplingen
  - 7552 Pfullendorf, Heiligenberg, Herdwangen-Schönach, Ostrach
  - 7553 Salem, Deggenhausertal, Überlingen
  - 7554 Heiligenberg, Frickingen, Salem, Überlingen
  - 7555 Deggenhausertal, Illmensee, Salem
  - 7556 Uhldingen-Mühlhofen, Salem
  - 7557 Herdwangen-Schönach, Hohenfels, Owingen
  - 7558 Illmensee, Ostrach, Pfullendorf
- 756
  - 7561 Leutkirch im Allgäu, Aichstetten, Bad Wurzach
  - 7562 Isny im Allgäu, Argenbühl, Maierhöfen
  - 7563 Kißlegg, Argenbühl, Leutkirch im Allgäu
  - 7564 Bad Wurzach, Leutkirch im Allgäu
  - 7565 Aichstetten, Aitrach, Bad Wurzach, Leutkirch im Allgäu
  - 7566 Argenbühl, Heimenkirch, Isny im Allgäu, Leutkirch im Allgäu
  - 7567 Leutkirch, Argenbühl, Isny im Allgäu
  - 7568 Bad Wurzach-Hauerz, Aitrach, Bad Wurzach, Rot an der Rot, Steinhausen an der Rottum
  - 7569 Isny im Allgäu-Eisenbach, Buchenberg, Isny im Allgäu
- 757
  - 7570 Sigmaringen-Gutenstein, Beuron, Leibertingen, Meßkirch, Sigmaringen
  - 7571 Sigmaringen, Bingen, Inzigkofen, Sigmaringendorf, Stetten am kalten Markt
  - 7572 Mengen, Altheim bei Riedlingen, Hohentengen, Scheer, Sigmaringendorf
  - 7573 Stetten am kalten Markt, Sigmaringen
  - 7574 Gammertingen, Hettingen, Langenenslingen, Neufra
  - 7575 Meßkirch, Inzigkofen, Leibertingen, Sauldorf
  - 7576 Krauchenwies, Mengen
  - 7577 Veringenstadt, Hettingen, Sigmaringen, Winterlingen
  - 7578 Wald, Meßkirch, Sauldorf
  - 7579 Schwenningen, Beuron, Meßstetten
- 758
  - 7581 Bad Saulgau, Boms, Ebersbach-Musbach, Eichstegen
  - 7582 Bad Buchau, Alleshausen, Allmannsweiler, Biberach an der Riß, Dürnau, Kanzach, Moosburg, Oggelshausen, Seekirch, Tiefenbach
  - 7583 Bad Schussenried, Ebersbach-Musbach, Ingoldingen, Bad Saulgau
  - 7584 Altshausen, Boms, Ebenweiler, Ebersbach-Musbach, Eichstegen, Fronreute, Guggenhausen
  - 7585 Ostrach, Hohentengen
  - 7586 Herbertingen, Ertingen, Hohentengen
  - 7587 Hoßkirch, Guggenhausen, Königseggwald, Ostrach, Riedhausen, Unterwaldhausen
- 759 (not assigned)

=== 76 – Freiburg and surroundings ===
- 760
  - 7602 Oberried, Bollschweil, Münstertal/Schwarzwald
- 761 Freiburg im Breisgau, Au, Gundelfingen, Horben, Kirchzarten, Merzhausen, Sölden, Wittnau
- 762
  - 7620 Schopfheim
  - 7621 Lörrach, Binzen, Eimeldingen, Inzlingen, Rümmingen, Schallbach, Weil am Rhein, Wittlingen
  - 7622 Schopfheim, Hausen im Wiesental, Maulburg, Rheinfelden-Nordschwaben, Wieslet
  - 7623 Rheinfelden (Baden), Schwörstadt
  - 7624 Grenzach-Wyhlen
  - 7625 Zell im Wiesental, Häg-Ehrsberg
  - 7626 Kandern, Malsburg-Marzell, Schliengen
  - 7627 Steinen, Rheinfeden-Adelhausen
  - 7628 Efringen-Kirchen, Fischingen
  - 7629 Tegernau, Bürchau, Elbenschwand, Raich, Sallneck, Steinen-Endenburg, Wies
- 763
  - 7631 Müllheim, Auggen, Buggingen, Neuenburg
  - 7632 Badenweiler
  - 7633 Staufen im Breisgau, Bad Krozingen, Bollschweil, Ehrenkirchen, Hartheim, Heitersheim
  - 7634 Sulzburg, Ballrechten-Dottingen, Buggingen, Eschbach, Heitersheim, Neuenburg am Rhein
  - 7635 Schliengen, Bad Bellingen, Neuenburg am Rhein
  - 7636 Münstertal/Schwarzwald, Staufen im Breisgau
- 764
  - 7641 Emmendingen, Freiamt, Reute, Sexau, Teningen
  - 7642 Endingen am Kaiserstuhl, Forchheim, Riegel am Kaiserstuhl, Sasbach am Kaiserstuhl, Wyhl am Kaiserstuhl
  - 7643 Herbolzheim, Rheinhausen
  - 7644 Kenzingen, Malterdingen
  - 7645 Freiamt, Gutach im Breisgau, Sexau
  - 7646 Weisweil
- 765
  - 7651 Titisee-Neustadt, Breitnau, Friedenweiler
  - 7652 Breitnau, Hinterzarten, Titisee-Neustadt
  - 7653 Lenzkirch, Bonndorf im Schwarzwald
  - 7654 Löffingen, Bräunlingen-Unterbrend, Friedenweiler
  - 7655 Feldberg, Baden-Württemberg
  - 7656 Schluchsee
  - 7657 Eisenbach (Hochschwarzwald), Titisee-Neustadt, Vöhrenbach
- 766
  - 7660 St. Peter, Simonswald, Stegen
  - 7661 Kirchzarten, Buchenbach, Oberried, Stegen
  - 7662 Vogtsburg im Kaiserstuhl, Sasbach am Kaiserstuhl
  - 7663 Eichstetten am Kaiserstuhl, Bahlingen am Kaiserstuhl, Bötzingen, Teningen
  - 7664 Freiburg-Tiengen, Breisach-Rimsingen, Ebringen, Ehrenkirchen, Freiburg-Munzingen, Pfaffenweiler, Schallstadt
  - 7665 March, Gottenheim, Umkirch, Freiburg-Hochdorf
  - 7666 Denzlingen, Heuweiler, Vörstetten
  - 7667 Breisach am Rhein
  - 7668 Ihringen, Breisach am Rhein, Merdingen
  - 7669 St. Märgen, Titisee-Neustadt-Waldau
- 767
  - 7671 Todtnau
  - 7672 St. Blasien, Dachsberg, Häusern, Höchenschwand, Ibach
  - 7673 Schönau im Schwarzwald, Aitern, Böllen, Fröhnd, Neuenweg, Schönenberg, Tunau, Utzenfeld, Wembach, Wieden
  - 7674 Todtmoos, Todtnau
  - 7675 Bernau, St. Blasien
  - 7676 Feldberg, Baden-Württemberg, Todtnau
- 768
  - 7681 Waldkirch, Gutach im Breisgau
  - 7682 Elzach, Biederbach, Winden im Elztal
  - 7683 Simonswald
  - 7684 Glottertal
  - 7685 Gutach im Breisgau, Winden im Elztal
- 769 (not assigned)

=== 77 – Südschwarzwald ===
- 770
  - 7702 Blumberg
  - 7703 Bonndorf im Schwarzwald, Stühlingen
  - 7704 Geisingen
  - 7705 Bräunlingen-Mistelbrunn, Donaueschingen-OT: Hubertshofen, Wolterdingen; Villingen-Schwenningen-Tannheim
  - 7706 Bad Dürrheim-OT: Biesingen, Sunthausen, Oberbaldingen, Unterbaldingen, Öfingen, Immendingen
  - 7707 Bräunlingen-Döggingen, Hüfingen-Hausen vor Wald, -Mundelfingen, Löffingen
  - 7708 Geisingen
  - 7709 Wutach, Stühlingen
- 771 Donaueschingen, Bräunlingen, Hüfingen
- 772
  - 7720 Villingen-Schwenningen-OT: Schwenningen, Mühlhausen; Dauchingen
  - 7721 Villingen-Schwenningen-OT: Villingen, Pfaffenweiler, Obereschach, Herzogenweiler, Weilersbach; Brigachtal, Mönchweiler, Unterkirnach
  - 7722 Triberg im Schwarzwald, Furtwangen, Hornberg, Schonach im Schwarzwald, Schönwald im Schwarzwald
  - 7723 Furtwangen, Gütenbach
  - 7724 St. Georgen im Schwarzwald, Unterkirnach
  - 7725 Königsfeld im Schwarzwald, Hardt, Mönchweiler, Niedereschach, St. Georgen im Schwarzwald, Unterkirnach, Villingen-Schwenningen
  - 7726 Bad Dürrheim, Brigachtal
  - 7727 Vöhrenbach, Unterkirnach, Villingen-Schwenningen
  - 7728 Niedereschach, Dauchingen, Villingen-Schwenningen
  - 7729 Schramberg: OT Tennenbronn
- 773
  - 7731 Singen, Gottmadingen, Hilzingen, Mühlhausen-Ehingen, Rielasingen-Worblingen
  - 7732 Radolfzell am Bodensee, Gaienhofen, Moos
  - 7733 Engen, Immendingen, Mühlhausen-Ehingen, Tengen
  - 7734 Gailingen am Hochrhein, Büsingen am Hochrhein, Gottmadingen
  - 7735 Öhningen, Gaienhofen
  - 7736 Tengen, Blumberg
  - 7738 Steißlingen, Radolfzell am Bodensee, Singen
  - 7739 Hilzingen, Gottmadingen
- 774
  - 7741 Waldshut-Tiengen-OT: Tiengen, Aichen Gutenburg, Breitenfeld, Detzeln, Gurtweil, Indlekofen, Krenkingen, Oberalpfen; Küssaberg, Lauchringen, Ühlingen-Birkendorf, Weilheim
  - 7742 Klettgau, Dettighofen, Hohentengen am Hochrhein, Küssaberg, Lauchringen
  - 7743 Ühlingen-Birkendorf, Grafenhausen, Stühlingen, Waldshut-Tiengen
  - 7744 Stühlingen
  - 7745 Jestetten, Dettighofen, Lottstetten
  - 7746 Eggingen, Wutöschingen
  - 7747 Grafenhausen, Schluchsee, Ühlingen-Birkendorf, Waldshut-Tiengen, Weilheim
  - 7748 Grafenhausen
- 775
  - 7751 Waldshut-Tiengen, Dogern
  - 7753 Albbruck, Laufenburg (Baden)
  - 7754 Görwihl, Albbruck
  - 7755 Weilheim (Baden), Albbruck, Dachsberg (Südschwarzwald), Höchenschwand, St. Blasien, Waldshut-Tiengen
- 776
  - 7761 Bad Säckingen, Rickenbach (Hotzenwald), Wehr (Baden)
  - 7762 Wehr (Baden), Hasel, Schwörstadt
  - 7763 Murg, Bad Säckingen, Laufenburg (Baden)
  - 7764 Herrischried, Görwihl
  - 7765 Rickenbach
- 777
  - 7771 Stockach, Bodman-Ludwigshafen, Eigeltingen, Hohenfels, Orsingen-Nenzingen
  - 7773 Bodman-Ludwigshafen, Stockach, Überlingen
  - 7774 Eigeltingen, Aach, Orsingen-Nenzingen, Volkertshausen
  - 7775 Mühlingen, Eigeltingen, Hohenfels, Stockach
  - 7777 Sauldorf, Buchheim, Leibertingen, Neuhausen ob Eck
- 778 (not assigned)
- 779 (not assigned)

=== 78 – Offenburg and Nordschwarzwald ===
- 780
  - 7802 Oberkirch, Lautenbach
  - 7803 Gengenbach, Berghaupten, Ohlsbach
  - 7804 Oppenau
  - 7805 Appenweier, Oberkirch-Nußbach, -Zusenhofen
  - 7806 Bad Peterstal-Griesbach, Oppenau
  - 7807 Neuried (Rhein)
  - 7808 Hohberg, Friesenheim-Oberschopfheim, Neuried-Schutterzell
- 781 Offenburg, Durbach, Ortenberg, Schutterwald
- 782
  - 7821 Lahr/Schwarzwald, Friesenheim
  - 7822 Ettenheim, Kappel-Grafenhausen, Mahlberg-Orschweier, Ringsheim, Rust
  - 7823 Seelbach, Schuttertal
  - 7824 Schwanau, Meißenheim
  - 7825 Kippenheim, Lahr/Schwarzwald, Mahlberg
  - 7826 Schuttertal, Biederbach, Ettenheim, Hofstetten
- 783
  - 7831 Hausach, Gutach (Schwarzwaldbahn)
  - 7832 Haslach im Kinzigtal, Fischerbach, Hofstetten, Mühlenbach, Steinach
  - 7833 Hornberg, Gutach (Schwarzwaldbahn)
  - 7834 Wolfach, Hausach, Oberwolfach, Schiltach
  - 7835 Zell am Harmersbach, Biberach (Baden)
  - 7836 Schiltach, Schenkenzell, Wolfach
  - 7837 Oberharmersbach, Zell am Harmersbach
  - 7838 Nordrach
  - 7839 Schapbach, Oberwolfach
- 784
  - 7841 Achern, Lauf, Sasbach, Sasbachwalden
  - 7842 Kappelrodeck, Ottenhöfen im Schwarzwald, Seebach
  - 7843 Renchen, Achern-Wagshurst
  - 7844 Rheinau, Renchen
- 785
  - 7851 Kehl
  - 7852 Willstätt, Kehl-Odelshofen
  - 7853 Kehl-Bodersweier, -Querbach, -Zierolshofen, -Leutesheim, Rheinau-Linx
  - 7854 Kehl-Goldscheuer, -Marlen, -Kittersburg, -Hohnhurst, Willstätt-Eckartsweier
- 786 (not assigned)
- 787 (not assigned)
- 788 (not assigned)
- 789 (not assigned)

=== 79 – Schwäbisch Hall and surroundings ===
- 790
  - 7903 Mainhardt, Großerlach, Michelfeld, Wüstenrot
  - 7904 Ilshofen, Braunsbach, Crailsheim, Kirchberg an der Jagst, Langenburg, Schwäbisch Hall, Vellberg, Wolpertshausen
  - 7905 Langenburg, Braunsbach, Gerabronn, Ilshofen, Künzelsau
  - 7906 Braunsbach, Ilshofen, Langenburg, Schwäbisch Hall, Untermünkheim, Wolpertshausen
  - 7907 Schwäbisch Hall-Sulzdorf, Ilshofen, Schwäbisch Hall, Vellberg, Wolpertshausen
- 791 Schwäbisch Hall, Braunsbach, Michelbach an der Bilz, Michelfeld, Rosengarten, Untermünkheim
- 792 (not assigned)
- 793
  - 7930 Boxberg, Ahorn, Bad Mergentheim
  - 7931 Bad Mergentheim, Boxberg, Dörzbach, Igersheim, Mulfingen, Niederstetten
  - 7932 Niederstetten, Bad Mergentheim, Creglingen, Schrozberg, Weikersheim
  - 7933 Creglingen, Niederstetten, Schrozberg
  - 7934 Weikersheim, Niederstetten
  - 7935 Schrozberg, Niederstetten
  - 7936 Schrozberg-Bartenstein, Blaufelden, Mulfingen, Schrozberg
  - 7937 Dörzbach, Bad Mergentheim, Krautheim, Mulfingen
  - 7938 Mulfingen, Bad Mergentheim, Dörzbach, Ingelfingen, Schrozberg
  - 7939 Schrozberg-Spielbach, Creglingen, Niederstetten, Schrozberg
- 794
  - 7940 Künzelsau, Ingelfingen, Kupferzell, Langenburg, Niedernhall
  - 7941 Öhringen, Neuenstein, Pfedelbach, Zweiflingen
  - 7942 Neuenstein, Öhringen, Waldenburg
  - 7943 Forchtenberg, Jagsthausen, Schöntal, Widdern
  - 7944 Kupferzell, Künzelsau, Untermünkheim
  - 7945 Wüstenrot, Bretzfeld, Mainhardt
  - 7946 Bretzfeld, Langenbrettach, Obersulm, Pfedelbach, Wüstenrot
  - 7947 Forchtenberg, Öhringen, Schöntal, Weißbach, Zweiflingen
  - 7948 Öhringen-Ohrnberg, Forchtenberg, Öhringen, Zweiflingen
  - 7949 Pfedelbach-Untersteinbach, Bretzfeld, Michelfeld, Öhringen, Pfedelbach, Waldenburg
- 795
  - 7950 Schnelldorf, Feuchtwangen, Kreßberg, Satteldorf, Wörnitz
  - 7951 Crailsheim, Ilshofen, Kirchberg an der Jagst, Kreßberg, Satteldorf
  - 7952 Gerabronn, Blaufelden, Langenburg, Rot am See
  - 7953 Blaufelden, Gerabronn, Rot am See, Schrozberg
  - 7954 Kirchberg an der Jagst, Crailsheim, Ilshofen, Rot am See
  - 7955 Wallhausen, Rot am See, Satteldorf
  - 7957 Kreßberg, Crailsheim, Schnelldorf, Stimpfach
  - 7958 Rot am See-Brettheim, Blaufelden, Gerabronn, Kirchberg an der Jagst, Rot am See, Wallhausen
  - 7959 Frankenhardt, Jagstzell, Rosenberg
- 796
  - 7961 Ellwangen (Jagst), Ellenberg, Hüttlingen, Jagstzell, Neuler, Rainau, Stödtlen, Unterschneidheim
  - 7962 Fichtenau, Ellenberg, Jagstzell, Stimpfach, Wört
  - 7963 Adelmannsfelden, Abtsgmünd, Bühlerzell, Neuler, Rosenberg
  - 7964 Stödtlen, Ellenberg, Ellwangen (Jagst), Tannhausen, Wört
  - 7965 Ellwangen-Röhlingen, Ellenberg, Ellwangen (Jagst), Rainau, Westhausen
  - 7966 Unterschneidheim, Ellwangen (Jagst), Tannhausen
  - 7967 Jagstzell, Ellwangen (Jagst), Fichtenau, Frankenhardt, Rosenberg, Stimpfach
- 797
  - 7971 Gaildorf, Fichtenberg
  - 7972 Gschwend, Alfdorf, Fichtenberg
  - 7973 Obersontheim, Bühlertann
  - 7974 Bühlerzell, Adelmannsfelden, Bühlertann
  - 7975 Abtsgmünd-Untergröningen, Abtsgmünd, Adelmannsfelden, Obergröningen
  - 7976 Sulzbach-Laufen, Abtsgmünd
  - 7977 Oberrot, Fichtenberg, Schwäbisch Hall
- 798 (not assigned)
- 799 (not assigned)

== 8 ==
=== 80 ===
- 800 toll-free numbers (Freecall)
- 801 toll-free numbers, reserved
- 802
  - 8021 Waakirchen
  - 8022 Tegernsee
  - 8023 Bayrischzell
  - 8024 Holzkirchen
  - 8025 Miesbach
  - 8026 Hausham
  - 8027 Dietramszell
  - 8028 Fischbachau
  - 8029 Kreuth bei Tegernsee
- 803
  - 8031 Rosenheim
  - 8032 Rohrdorf
  - 8033 Oberaudorf
  - 8034 Brannenburg
  - 8035 Raubling
  - 8036 Stephanskirchen Simssee
  - 8038 Vogtareuth
  - 8039 Rott a.Inn
- 804
  - 8041 Bad Tölz
  - 8042 Lenggries
  - 8043 Jachenau
  - 8045 Lenggries-Fall
  - 8046 Bad Heilbrunn
- 805
  - 8051 Prien a.Chiemsee
  - 8052 Aschau i.Chiemgau
  - 8053 Bad Endorf
  - 8054 Breitbrunn a.Chiemsee
  - 8055 Halfing
  - 8056 Eggstätt
  - 8057 Aschau-Sachrang
- 806
  - 8061 Bad Aibling
  - 8062 Bruckmühl and Vagen
  - 8063 Feldkirchen-Westerham
  - 8064 Au bei Bad Aibling
  - 8065 Tuntenhausen-Schönau
  - 8066 Bad Feilnbach
  - 8067 Tuntenhausen
- 807
  - 8071 Wasserburg am Inn
  - 8072 Haag in Oberbayern
  - 8073 Gars am Inn
  - 8074 Schnaitsee
  - 8075 Amerang
  - 8076 Pfaffing
- 808
  - 8081 Dorfen
  - 8082 Schwindegg
  - 8083 Isen
  - 8084 Taufkirchen Vils
  - 8085 Sankt Wolfgang Kr. Erding
  - 8086 Buchbach
- 809
  - 8091 Kirchseon
  - 8092 Grafing bei München
  - 8093 Glonn i. Kreis Ebersberg
  - 8094 Steinhöring
  - 8095 Aying

=== 81 ===
- 810
  - 8102 Höhenkirchen-Siegertsbrunn
  - 8104 Sauerlach
  - 8105 Gilching
  - 8106 Vaterstetten (former 08169)
- 811 Hallbergmoos
- 812
  - 8121 Markt Schwaben
  - 8122 Erding
  - 8123 Moosinning
  - 8124 Forstern in Oberbayern
- 813
  - 8131 Dachau
  - 8133 Haimhausen
  - 8134 Odelzhausen
  - 8135 Sulzemoos
  - 8136 Markt Indersdorf
  - 8137 Petershausen
  - 8138 Schwabhausen bei Dachau
- 814
  - 8141 Fürstenfeldbruck
  - 8142 Olching
  - 8143 Inning am Ammersee
  - 8144 Grafrath
  - 8145 Mammendorf
  - 8146 Moorenweis
- 815
  - 8151 Starnberg, Berg am Starnberger See
  - 8152 Herrsching am Ammersee, Seefeld
  - 8153 Weßling
  - 8157 Feldafing
  - 8158 Tutzing
- 816
  - 8161 Freising
  - 8165 Neufahrn bei Freising
  - 8166 Allershausen
  - 8167 Zolling
  - 8168 Attenkirchen
  - 8169 former area Code of Hallbergmoos (now 0811 since End of 1988)
- 817
  - 8170 Straßlach-Dingharting
  - 8171 Wolfratshausen
  - 8176 Egling bei Wolfratshausen
  - 8177 Münsing
  - 8178 Icking
  - 8179 Eurasburg an der Loisach

=== 82 – Augsburg and surroundings ===
- 820
  - 8206 Prittriching
- 821 Augsburg
- 822
  - 8221 Günzburg
  - 8222 Burgau
  - 8223 Ichenhausen
  - 8224 Offingen
  - 8225 Jettingen-Scheppach
  - 8226 Bibertal
- 823
  - 8230 Gablingen
  - 8231 Königsbrunn
  - 8232 Schwabmünchen
  - 8233 Kissing
  - 8234 Bobingen
  - 8236 Fischach
  - 8237 Aindling
  - 8238 Gessertshausen
  - 8239 Langenneufnach
- 824
  - 8241 Buchloe
  - 8243 Fuchstal
  - 8245 Türkheim
  - 8246 Waal
  - 8247 Bad Wörishofen
  - 8248 Lamerdingen
  - 8249 Ettringen
- 825
  - 8250 Hilgertshausen-Tandern
  - 8251 Aichach
  - 8252 Schrobenhausen
  - 8253 Pöttmes
  - 8254 Altomünster
  - 8257 Inchenhofen
  - 8258 Sielenbach
  - 8259 Schiltberg
- 826
  - 8261 Mindelheim
  - 8262 Mittelneufnach
  - 8263 Breitenbrunn
  - 8265 Pfaffenhausen
  - 8266 Kirchheim in Schwaben
  - 8267 Dirlewang
  - 8268 Tussenhausen
  - 8269 Unteregg
- 827
  - 8271 Meitingen, Thierhaupten
  - 8272 Wertingen
  - 8273 Nordendorf
  - 8274 Buttenwiesen
  - 8276 Baar, Thierhaupten
- 828
  - 8281 Thannhausen
  - 8282 Krumbach
  - 8283 Neuburg an der Kammel
  - 8284 Ziemetshausen
  - 8285 Burtenbach
- 829
  - 8291 Zusmarshausen
  - 8292 Dinkelscherben
  - 8293 Welden
  - 8294 Horgau
  - 8295 Altenmünster
  - 8296 Villenbach

=== 83 ===
- 830 --
  - 8302 Görisried
  - 8303 Waltenhofen
  - 8304 Wildpoldsried
  - 8306 Ronsberg
- 831 Kempten Allgäu
- 832 --
  - 8320 Missen-Wilhams
  - 8321 Sonthofen
  - 8322 Oberstdorf
  - 8323 Immenstadt i.Allgäu
  - 8324 Bad Hindelang
  - 8325 Oberstaufen-Thalkirchdorf
  - 8326 Fischen im Allgäu
  - 8327 Rettenberg
  - 8328 Balderschwang
  - 8329 former area code of Kleinwalsertal, an Austrian exclave in Germany, now accessible through Austria country code +43 5517
- 833 --
  - 8330 Legau
  - 8331 Memmingen
  - 8332 Ottobeuren
  - 8333 Babenhausen (Schwab)
  - 8334 Bad Grönenbach
  - 8335 Fellheim
  - 8336 Erkheim
  - 8337 Altenstadt (Iller)
  - 8338 Böhen
- 834 --
  - 8340 Baisweil
  - 8341 Kaufbeuren
  - 8342 Marktoberdorf
  - 8343 Aitrang
  - 8344 Westendorf b.Kaufb
  - 8345 Stöttwang
  - 8346 Pforzen
  - 8347 Friesenried
  - 8348 Bidingen
  - 8349 Stötten a.Auerberg
- 836 --
  - 8361 Nesselwang
  - 8362 Füssen
  - 8363 Pfronten
  - 8364 Seeg
  - 8365 Wertach
    - 8365 8 former area code of Jungholz, an Austrian exclave in Germany, now accessible through Austria country code +43 5676
  - 8366 Oy-Mittelberg
  - 8367 Roßhaupten (Forggensee)
  - 8368 Halblech
  - 8369 Rückholz
- 837—Area of Kempten
  - 8370 Wiggensbach
  - 8372 Günzach
  - 8373 Altusried
  - 8374 Dietmannsried
  - 8375 Weitnau
  - 8376 Sulzberg (Allgäu)
  - 8377 Unterthingau
  - 8378 Buchenberg b. Kempten
  - 8379 Waltenhofen-Martinszell-Oberdorf
- 838 --
  - 8380 Lindau-Achberg
  - 8381 Lindenberg im Allgäu
  - 8382 Lindau
  - 8383 Grünenbach (Allgäu)
  - 8384 Röthenbach (Allgäu)
  - 8385 Hergatz
  - 8386 Oberstaufen
  - 8387 Weiler-Simmerberg
  - 8388 Hergesnweiler
  - 8389 Weißensberg
- 839 --
  - 8392 Markt Rettenbach
  - 8393 Holzgünz
  - 8394 Lautrach
  - 8395 Tannheim (Württ.)

=== 84 ===
- 840
  - 8402 Münchsmünster
  - 8403 Pförring
  - 8404 Oberdolling
  - 8405 Stammham b.Ingolstadt
  - 8406 Böhmfeld
  - 8407 Grossmehring
- 841 Ingolstadt
- 842
  - 8421 Eichstätt
  - 8422 Dollnstein
  - 8423 Titting
  - 8424 Nassenfels
  - 8426 Walting Kr. Eichstätt
  - 8427 Wellheim
- 843
  - 8431 Neuburg a.d.Donau
  - 8432 Burgheim
  - 8433 Königsmoos
  - 8434 Rennertshofen
- 844
  - 8441 Pfaffenhofen a.d.Ilm
  - 8442 Wolnzach
  - 8443 Hohenwart Paar
  - 8444 Schweitenkirchen
  - 8445 Gerolsbach
  - 8446 Pörnbach
- 845
  - 8450 Ingolstadt-Zuchering
  - 8452 Geisenfeld
  - 8453 Reichertshofen Oberbay.
  - 8454 Karlshuld
  - 8456 Lenting
  - 8457 Vohburg a.d.Donau
  - 8458 Gaimersheim
  - 8459 Manching
- 846
  - 8460 Berching-Holnstein
  - 8461 Beilngries
  - 8462 Berching
  - 8463 Greding
  - 8464 Dietfurt a.d.Altmühl
  - 8465 Kipfenberg
  - 8466 Denkendorf Oberbay.
  - 8467 Kinding
  - 8468 Altmannstein-Pondorf
  - 8469 Freystadt-Burggriesbach

=== 85 ===
- 850
  - 8501 Thyrnau
  - 8502 Fürstenzell
  - 8503 Neuhaus am Inn
  - 8504 Tittling
  - 8505 Hutthurm
  - 8506 Bad Höhenstadt
  - 8507 Neuburg am Inn
  - 8509 Ruderting
- 851 Passau
- 853
  - 8531 Pocking
  - 8532 Bad Griesbach im Rottal
  - 8533 Rotthalmünster
  - 8534 Tettenweis
  - 8535 Haarbach
  - 8536 Kößlarn
  - 8537 Bad Füssing-Aigen
  - 8538 Pocking-Hartkirchen
- 854
  - 8541 Vilshofen Niederbay.
  - 8542 Ortenburg
  - 8543 Aidenbach
  - 8544 Eging am See
  - 8545 Hofkirchen (Bavaria)
  - 8546 Windorf-Otterskirchen
  - 8547 Osterhofen-Gergweis
  - 8548 Vilshofen-Sandbach
  - 8549 Vilshofen-Pleinting
- 855
  - 8550 Philippsreut
  - 8551 Freyung
  - 8552 Grafenau Niederbay.
  - 8553 Spiegelau
  - 8554 Schönberg (Niederbayern)
  - 8555 Perlesreut
  - 8556 Haidmühle
  - 8557 Mauth
  - 8558 Hohenau (Niederbayern)
- 856
  - 8561 Pfarrkirchen Niederbay.
  - 8562 Triftern
  - 8563 Bad Birnbach Rottal
  - 8564 Johanniskirchen
  - 8565 Dietersburg-Baumgarten
- 857
  - 8571 Simbach am Inn
  - 8572 Tann Niederbay.
  - 8573 Ering
  - 8574 Wittibreut
- 858
  - 8581 Waldkirchen Niederbay.
  - 8582 Röhrnbach
  - 8583 Neureichenau
  - 8584 Breitenberg (Niederbayern)
  - 8585 Grainet
  - 8586 Hauzenberg
- 859
  - 8591 Obernzell
  - 8592 Wegscheid Niederbay.
  - 8593 Untergriesbach

=== 86 ===
- 861 Traunstein
- 862
  - 8621 Trostberg
  - 8622 Tacherting
  - 8623 Kirchweidach
  - 8624 Obing
  - 8628 Kienberg
  - 8629 Palling
- 863
  - 8630 Kraiburg
  - 8631 Mühldorf
  - 8633 Tüßling/Polling
  - 8634 Garching
  - 8636 Ampfing
  - 8638 Waldkraiburg
- 864
  - 8640 Reit im Winkl
  - 8641 Grassau
  - 8642 Übersee
  - 8649 Schleching
- 865
  - 8650 Marktschellenberg
  - 8651 Bad Reichenhall
  - 8652 Berchtesgaden
  - 8654 Freilassing
  - 8656 Anger
  - 8657 Ramsau
- 866
  - 8661 Grabenstätt
  - 8662 Siegsdorf
  - 8663 Ruhpolding
  - 8664 Chieming
  - 8665 Inzell
  - 8666 Teisendorf
  - 8667 Seebruck
  - 8669 Traunreut
- 867
  - 8670 Reischach
  - 8677 Burghausen
  - 8679 Burgkirchen an der Alz
- 868
  - 8682 Laufen (Salzach)

=== 87 ===
- 870
  - 8702 Wörth (Isar)
  - 8703 Essenbach
  - 8704 Altdorf-Pfettrach
  - 8705 Altfraunhofen
  - 8706 Vilsheim
  - 8707 Adlkofen
  - 8708 Weihmichl-Unterneuhausen
  - 8709 Eching
- 871 Landshut
- 872
  - 8722 Gangkofen
- 873
  - 8731 Dingolfing
  - 8732 Frontenhausen
- 874
  - 8741 Vilsbiburg
  - 8743 Geisenhausen
  - 8745 Bodenkirchen
- 875
- 876
  - 8761 Moosburg an der Isar
  - 8765 Tondorf
- 878
  - 8781 Rottenburg an der Laaber
- 879

=== 88 ===
- 880
  - 8801 Seeshaupt
  - 8802 Huglfing
  - 8803 Peißenberg
  - 8805 Hohenpeißenberg
  - 8806 Utting am Ammersee
  - 8807 Dießen am Ammersee
  - 8808 Pähl
  - 8809 Wessobrunn
- 881 Weilheim in Oberbayern
- 882
  - 8821 Garmisch-Partenkirchen
  - 8822 Oberammergau
  - 8823 Mittenwald
  - 8824 Oberau
  - 8825 Krün
- 884
  - 8841 Murnau
- 885
  - 8851 Kochel am See
  - 8856 Penzberg
  - 8857 Benediktbeuern
  - 8858 Walchensee
- 886
  - 8860 Bernbeuren
  - 8861 Schongau
  - 8862 Steingaden (Obb)
  - 8867 Rottenbuch (Obb)
  - 8868 Schwabsoien
  - 8869 Kinsau

=== 89 – München ===
- 89 München

== 9 ==
=== Remark ===
These area codes were changed in February 1997 in order to allow service 0900 numbers:

- 9002 → 09090 Rain (Lech)
- 9003 → 09080 Harburg (Schwaben)
- 9004 → 09070 Tapfheim
- 9005 → 09084 Bissingen (Schwaben)
- 9006 → 09078 Mertingen
- 9007 → 09097 Marxheim
- 9008 → 09089 Bissingen-Unterringingen
- 9009 → 09099 Kaisheim

=== 90 ===
- 900
  - 900-1 premium-rate information services
  - 900-3 premium-rate entertainment services
  - 900-5 premium-rate services (miscellaneous)
  - 900-9 premium-rate dialer
- 901 premium-rate numbers, reserved
- 902 replacement for 0137/0138, planned
- 906 Donauwörth
- 907
  - 9070 Tapfheim
  - 9071 Dillingen
  - 9072 Lauingen
  - 9073 Gundelfingen
  - 9074 Höchstädt
  - 9075 Glött
  - 9076 Wittislingen
  - 9077 Bachhagel
  - 9078 Mertingen
- 908
  - 9080 Harburg
  - 9081 Nördlingen
  - 9082 Oettingen
  - 9083 Möttingen
  - 9084 Bissingen
  - 9085 Alerheim
  - 9086 Fremdingen
  - 9087 Marktoffingen
  - 9088 Mönchsdeggingen
  - 9089 Bissingen-Unterringingen
- 909
  - 9090 Rain
  - 9091 Monheim
  - 9092 Wemding
  - 9093 Polsingen
  - 9094 Tagmersheim
  - 9097 Marxheim
  - 9099 Kaisheim

=== 91 ===
- 910
  - 9101 Langenzenn
  - 9102 Wilhermsdorf
  - 9103 Cadolzburg
  - 9104 Emskirchen
  - 9105 Großhabersdorf
  - 9106 Markt Erlbach
  - 9107 Trautskirchen
- 911 Nürnberg/Fürth
- 912
  - 9122 Schwabach
  - 9123 Lauf an der Pegnitz
  - 9126 Eckental
  - 9127 Roßtal
  - 9128 Feucht
  - 9129 Wendelstein (Mittelfranken)
- 913
  - 9131 Erlangen
  - 9132 Herzogenaurach
  - 9133 Baiersdorf
  - 9134 Neunkirchen am Brand
  - 9135 Heßdorf
- 914
  - 9141 Weißenburg in Bayern
  - 9142 Treuchtlingen
  - 9143 Pappenheim
  - 9144 Pleinfeld
  - 9145 Solnhofen
  - 9146 Markt Berolzheim
  - 9147 Nennslingen
  - 9148 Ettenstatt
  - 9149 Weißenburg-Suffersheim
- 915
  - 9151 Hersbruck
  - 9152 Hartenstein
  - 9153 Schnaittach
  - 9154 Pommelsbrunn
  - 9155 Simmelsdorf
  - 9156 Neuhaus an der Pegnitz
  - 9157 Alfeld (Mittelfranken)
  - 9158 Offenhausen (Mittelfranken)
- 916
  - 9161 Neustadt an der Aisch
  - 9162 Scheinfeld
  - 9163 Dachsbach
  - 9164 Langenfeld
  - 9165 Sugenheim
  - 9166 Münchsteinach
  - 9167 Oberscheinfeld
- 917
  - 9170 Schwanstetten
  - 9171 Roth
  - 9172 Georgensgmünd
  - 9173 Thalmässing
  - 9174 Hilpoltstein
  - 9175 Spalt
  - 9176 Allersberg
  - 9177 Heideck
  - 9178 Abenberg
  - 9179 Freystadt
- 918
  - 9180 Seligenporten bei Pyrbaum (Oberpfalz)
  - 9181 Neumarkt in der Oberpfalz
  - 9182 Velburg
  - 9183 Burgthann
  - 9184 Deining (Oberpfalz)
  - 9185 Mühlhausen (Oberpfalz)
  - 9186 Lauterhofen (Oberpfalz)
  - 9187 Altdorf bei Nürnberg
  - 9188 Postbauer-Heng
  - 9189 Berg bei Neumarkt in der Oberpfalz
- 919
  - 9191 Forchheim
  - 9192 Gräfenberg
  - 9193 Höchstadt
  - 9194 Ebermannstadt
  - 9195 Adelsdorf
  - 9196 Wiesenttal
  - 9198 Heiligenstadt in Oberfranken

=== 92 ===
- 920
  - 9201 Gesees
  - 9202 Waischenfeld
  - 9203 Neudrossenfeld
  - 9204 Plankenfels
  - 9205 Vorbach
  - 9206 Obernsees
  - 9207 Königsfeld (Oberfranken)
  - 9208 Bindlach
- 921 Bayreuth
- 922
  - 9220 Azendorf
  - 9221 Kulmbach
  - 9222 Presseck
  - 9223 Rugendorf
  - 9224 (not assigned)
  - 9225 Stadtsteinach
  - 9226 (not assigned)
  - 9227 Neuenmarkt
  - 9228 Thurnau
  - 9229 Mainleus
- 923
  - 9230 (not assigned)
  - 9231 Marktredwitz
  - 9232 Wunsiedel im Fichtelgebirge
  - 9233 Arzberg (Oberfranken)
  - 9234 Neusorg
  - 9235 Thierstein
  - 9236 Nagel
  - 9237 (not assigned)
  - 9238 Röslau
  - 9239 (not assigned)
- 924
  - 9240 (not assigned)
  - 9241 Pegnitz
  - 9242 Gößweinstein
  - 9243 Pottenstein (Oberfranken)
  - 9244 Betzenstein
  - 9245 Obertrubach
  - 9246 Trockau
  - 9247 (not assigned)
  - 9248 (not assigned)
  - 9249 (not assigned)
- 925
  - 9250 (not assigned)
  - 9251 Münchberg
  - 9252 Helmbrechts
  - 9253 Bad Weißenstadt
  - 9254 Gefrees
  - 9255 Marktleugast
  - 9256 Stammbach
  - 9257 Zell (Oberfranken)
  - 9258 (not assigned)
  - 9259 (not assigned)
- 926
  - 9260 Wilhelmsthal (Oberfranken)
  - 9261 Kronach
  - 9262 Wallenfels
  - 9263 Ludwigsstadt
  - 9264 Küps
  - 9265 Pressig
  - 9266 Mitwitz
  - 9267 Nordhalben
  - 9268 Teuschnitz
  - 9269 Tettau (Oberfranken)
- 927
  - 9270 Creußen
  - 9271 Alladorf
  - 9272 Fichtelberg
  - 9273 Bad Berneck im Fichtelgebirge
  - 9274 Hollfeld
  - 9275 Speichersdorf
  - 9276 Bischofsgrün
  - 9277 Warmensteinach
  - 9278 Weidenberg
  - 9279 Mistelgau
- 928
  - 9280 Selbitz (Oberfranken)
  - 9281 Hof (Saale)
  - 9282 Naila
  - 9283 Rehau
  - 9284 Schwarzenbach an der Saale
  - 9285 Kirchenlamitz
  - 9286 Oberkotzau
  - 9287 Selb
  - 9288 Bad Steben
  - 9289 Schwarzenbach am Wald
- 929
  - 9290 (not assigned)
  - 9291 (not assigned)
  - 9292 Konradsreuth
  - 9293 Berg (Oberfranken)
  - 9294 Regnitzlosau
  - 9295 Töpen
  - 9296 (not assigned)
  - 9297 (not assigned)
  - 9298 (not assigned)
  - 9299 (not assigned)

=== 93 ===
- 930
  - 9301 (not assigned)
  - 9302 Rottendorf (Unterfranken)
  - 9303 Eibelstadt
  - 9304 (not assigned)
  - 9305 Estenfeld
  - 9306 Kist
  - 9307 Altertheim
  - 9308 (not assigned)
  - 9309 (not assigned)
- 931 Würzburg
- 932
  - 9321 Kitzingen
  - 9322 (not assigned)
  - 9323 Iphofen
  - 9324 Dettelbach
  - 9325 Kleinlangheim
  - 9326 Markt Einersheim
  - 9327 (not assigned)
  - 9328 (not assigned)
  - 9329 (not assigned)
- 933
  - 9330 (not assigned)
  - 9331 Ochsenfurt
  - 9332 Marktbreit
  - 9333 Sommerhausen
  - 9334 Giebelstadt
  - 9335 Aub (Kreis Würzburg)
  - 9336 Bütthard
  - 9337 Gaukönigshofen
  - 9338 Röttingen (Unterfranken)
  - 9339 Ippesheim
- 934
  - 9340 Königheim-Brehmen
  - 9341 Tauberbischofsheim
  - 9342 Wertheim
  - 9343 Lauda-Königshofen
  - 9344 Großrinderfeld-Gerchsheim
  - 9345 Külsheim (Baden)
  - 9346 Grünsfeld
  - 9347 Wittighausen
  - 9348 Werbach-Gamburg
  - 9349 Werbach-Wenkheim
- 935
  - 9350 Hundsbach (Unterfranken)
  - 9351 Gemünden am Main
  - 9352 Lohr am Main
  - 9353 Karlstadt
  - 9354 Rieneck
  - 9355 Frammersbach
  - 9356 Burgsinn
  - 9357 Gräfendorf (Unterfranken)
  - 9358 Gössenheim
  - 9359 Wiesenfeld (Unterfranken)
- 936
  - 9360 Thüngen (Bayern)
  - 9361 (not assigned)
  - 9362 (not assigned)
  - 9363 Arnstein (Unterfranken)
  - 9364 Zellingen
  - 9365 Rimpar
  - 9366 Geroldshausen
  - 9367 Unterpleichfeld
  - 9368 (not assigned)
  - 9369 Uettingen
- 937
  - 9370 (not assigned)
  - 9371 Miltenberg
  - 9372 Klingenberg am Main
  - 9373 Amorbach
  - 9374 Eschau (Unterfranken)
  - 9375 Freudenberg
  - 9376 Collenberg
  - 9377 Freudenberg-Boxtal
  - 9378 Riedern (Unterfranken)
  - 9379 (not assigned)
- 938
  - 9380 (not assigned)
  - 9381 Volkach
  - 9382 Gerolzhofen
  - 9383 Wiesentheid
  - 9384 Schwanfeld
  - 9385 Kolitzheim
  - 9386 Prosselsheim
  - 9387 (not assigned)
  - 9388 (not assigned)
  - 9389 (not assigned)
- 939
  - 9390 (not assigned)
  - 9391 Marktheidenfeld
  - 9392 Faulbach (Unterfranken)
  - 9393 Rothenfels (Unterfranken)
  - 9394 Oberndorf bei Marktheidenfeld
  - 9395 Homburg am Main
  - 9396 Urspringen bei Lohr am Main
  - 9397 Wertheim-Dertingen
  - 9398 Birkenfeld bei Würzburg
  - 9399 (not assigned)

=== 94 ===
- 940
  - 9400 (not assigned)
  - 9401 Neutraubling
  - 9402 Regenstauf
  - 9403 Donaustauf
  - 9404 Nittendorf
  - 9405 Bad Abbach
  - 9406 Mintraching
  - 9407 Wenzenbach
  - 9408 Altenthann
  - 9409 Pielenhofen
- 941 Regensburg
- 942
  - 9420 Gundhöring
  - 9421 Straubing
  - 9422 Bogen (Niederbayern)
  - 9423 Geiselhöring
  - 9424 Straßkirchen bei Straubing
  - 9425 (not assigned)
  - 9426 Oberschneiding
  - 9427 Leiblfing
  - 9428 Kirchroth
  - 9429 Rain (Niederbayern)
- 943
  - 9430 (not assigned)
  - 9431 Schwandorf
  - 9432 (not assigned)
  - 9433 Nabburg
  - 9434 Bodenwöhr
  - 9435 Schwarzenfeld
  - 9436 Nittenau
  - 9437 (not assigned)
  - 9438 Freihöls
  - 9439 Kemnath bei Fuhrn
- 944
  - 9440 (not assigned)
  - 9441 Kelheim
  - 9442 Riedenburg
  - 9443 Abensberg
  - 9444 Siegenburg
  - 9445 Neustadt an der Donau
  - 9446 Altmannstein
  - 9447 Essing
  - 9448 Herrnwahlthann
  - 9449 (not assigned)
- 945
  - 9450 (not assigned)
  - 9451 Eggmühl
  - 9452 Langquaid
  - 9453 Thalmassing (Oberpfalz)
  - 9454 Aufhausen (Oberpfalz)
  - 9455 (not assigned)
  - 9456 (not assigned)
  - 9457 (not assigned)
  - 9458 (not assigned)
  - 9459 (not assigned)
- 946
  - 9460 (not assigned)
  - 9461 Roding
  - 9462 Falkenstein (Oberpfalz)
  - 9463 Wald (Oberpfalz)
  - 9464 Walderbach, Reichenbach
  - 9465 Neukirchen-Balbini
  - 9466 Stamsried
  - 9467 Michelsneukirchen
  - 9468 Zell (Landkreis Cham)
  - 9469 Neubäu (Oberpfalz)
- 947
  - 9470 (not assigned)
  - 9471 Burglengenfeld
  - 9472 Hohenfels (Oberpfalz)
  - 9473 Kallmünz
  - 9474 Schmidmühlen
  - 9475 (not assigned)
  - 9476 (not assigned)
  - 9477 (not assigned)
  - 9478 (not assigned)
  - 9479 (not assigned)
- 948
  - 9480 Sünching
  - 9481 Pfatter
  - 9482 Wörth an der Donau
  - 9483 (not assigned)
  - 9484 Brennberg
  - 9485 (not assigned)
  - 9486 (not assigned)
  - 9487 (not assigned)
  - 9488 (not assigned)
  - 9489 (not assigned)
- 949
  - 9490 (not assigned)
  - 9491 Hemau
  - 9492 Parsberg
  - 9493 Beratzhausen
  - 9494 (not assigned)
  - 9495 Breitenbrunn (Oberpfalz)
  - 9496 (not assigned)
  - 9497 Seubersdorf (Oberpfalz)
  - 9498 Laaber bei Hemau
  - 9499 Painten

=== 95 ===
- 950
  - 9500 (not assigned)
  - 9501 (not assigned)
  - 9502 Frensdorf
  - 9503 Oberhaid (Oberfranken)
  - 9504 Stadelhofen
  - 9505 Litzendorf
  - 9506 (not assigned)
  - 9507 (not assigned)
  - 9508 (not assigned)
  - 9509 (not assigned)
- 951 Bamberg
- 952
  - 9521 Haßfurt
  - 9523 Hofheim in Unterfranken
  - 9524 Zeil am Main and Sand am Main
  - 9525 Königsberg in Bayern
  - 9527 Knetzgau
  - 9528 Donnersdorf
  - 9529 Oberaurach
- 953
  - 9531 Ebern
  - 9532 Maroldsweisach
  - 9533 Untermerzbach
  - 9534 Burgpreppach
  - 9535 Pfarrweisach
  - 9536 Kirchlauter
- 954
  - 9542 Schesslitz
  - 9543 Hirschaid
  - 9544 Baunach
  - 9545 Buttenheim
  - 9546 Burgebrach
  - 9547 Zapfendorf
  - 9548 Mühlhausen Mittelfr.
  - 9549 Lisberg
- 955
  - 9551 Burgwindheim
  - 9552 Burghaslach
  - 9553 Ebrach Oberfr.
  - 9554 Untersteinbach Unterfr.
  - 9555 Schlüsselfeld-Aschbach
  - 9556 Geiselwind
- 956
  - 9560 Grub a.Forst
  - 9561 Coburg
  - 9562 Sonnefeld
  - 9563 Rödental
  - 9564 Rodach
  - 9565 Untersiemau
  - 9566 Meeder
  - 9567 Sesslach-Gemünda
  - 9568 Neustadt b. Coburg
  - 9569 Sesslach
- 957
  - 9571 Lichtenfels (Bavaria)
  - 9572 Burgkunstadt
  - 9573 Staffelstein Oberfr.
  - 9574 Marktzeuln
  - 9575 Weismain
  - 9576 Lichtenfels-Isling

=== 96 ===
- 960
  - 9602 Neustadt an der Waldnaab
  - 9603 Floß
  - 9604 Wernberg-Köblitz
  - 9605 Weiherhammer
  - 9606 Pfreimd
  - 9607 Luhe-Wildenau
  - 9608 Kohlberg
- 961 Weiden (Oberpfalz)
- 962
  - 9621 Amberg (Oberpfalz)
  - 9622 Hirschau
  - 9624 Ensdorf (Oberpfalz)
  - 9625 Kastl bei Amberg (Oberpfalz)
  - 9626 Hohenburg
  - 9627 Freudenberg (Oberpfalz)
  - 9628 Ursensollen
- 963
  - 9631 Tirschenreuth
  - 9632 Waldsassen
  - 9633 Mitterteich
  - 9634 Wiesau
  - 9635 Bärnau
  - 9636 Plößberg
  - 9637 Falkenberg (Oberpfalz)
  - 9638 Bad Neualbenreuth
  - 9639 Mähring
- 964
  - 9641 Grafenwöhr
  - 9642 Kemnath-Stadt
  - 9643 Auerbach (Oberpfalz)
  - 9644 Pressath
  - 9645 Eschenbach (Oberpfalz)
  - 9646 Freihung
  - 9647 Kirchenthumbach
  - 9648 Neustadt am Kulm
- 965
  - 9651 Vohenstrauß
  - 9652 Waidhaus
  - 9653 Eslarn
  - 9654 Pleystein
  - 9655 Tännesberg
  - 9656 Moosbach (Oberpfalz)
  - 9657 Waldthurn
  - 9658 Georgenberg (Oberpfalz)
  - 9659 Leuchtenberg
- 966
  - 9661 Sulzbach-Rosenberg
  - 9662 Vilseck
  - 9663 Neukirchen bei Sulzbach-Rosenberg
  - 9664 Hahnbach
  - 9665 Königstein (Oberpfalz)
  - 9666 Illschwang
- 967
  - 9671 Oberviechtach
  - 9672 Neunburg vorm Wald
  - 9673 Tiefenbach (Oberpfalz)
  - 9674 Schönsee
  - 9675 Altendorf (Oberpfalz)
  - 9676 Winklarn (Oberpfalz)
  - 9677 Oberviechtach-Pullenried
- 968
  - 9681 Windischeschenbach
  - 9682 Erbendorf
  - 9683 Friedenfels

=== 97 ===
- 970
  - 9701 Sandberg Unterfr.
  - 9704 Euerdorf
  - 9708 Bad Bocklet
- 971 Bad Kissingen
- 972
  - 9720 Üchtelhausen
  - 9721 Schweinfurt
  - 9722 Werneck
  - 9723 Röthlein
  - 9724 Stadtlauringen
  - 9725 Poppenhausen Unterfr.
  - 9726 Euerbach
  - 9727 Schonungen-Marktsteinach
  - 9728 Wülfershausen Unterfr.
  - 9729 Grettstadt
- 973
  - 9732 Hammelburg
  - 9733 Münnerstadt
  - 9734 Burkardroth
  - 9735 Massbach
  - 9736 Oberthulba
  - 9737 Wartmannsroth
  - 9738 Rottershausen
- 974
  - 9741 Bad Brückenau
  - 9742 Kalbach Rhön
  - 9744 Zeitlofs-Detter
  - 9745 Wildflecken
  - 9746 Zeitlofs
  - 9747 Geroda
  - 9748 Motten
  - 9749 Oberbach Unterfr.
- 976
  - 9761 Bad Königshofen
  - 9762 Saal a.d.Saale
  - 9763 Sulzdorf a.d.Lederhecke
  - 9764 Höchheim
  - 9765 Trappstadt
  - 9766 Grosswenkheim
- 977
  - 9771 Bad Neustadt
  - 9772 Bischofsheim an der Rhön
  - 9773 Unsleben
  - 9774 Oberelsbach
  - 9775 Schönau an der Brend
  - 9776 Mellrichstadt
  - 9777 Ostheim vor der Rhön
  - 9778 Fladungen
  - 9779 Nordheim vor der Rhön

=== 98 ===
- 980
  - 9802 Ansbach-Katterbach
  - 9803 Colmberg
  - 9804 Aurach
  - 9805 Burgoberbach
- 981 Ansbach
- 982
  - 9820 Lehrberg
  - 9822 Bechhofen a. d. Heide
  - 9823 Leutershausen
  - 9824 Dietenhofen
  - 9825 Herrieden
  - 9826 Weidenbach Mittelfr.
  - 9827 Lichtenau Mittelfr.
  - 9828 Rügland
  - 9829 Flachslanden
- 983
  - 9831 Gunzenhausen
  - 9832 Wassertrüdingen
  - 9833 Heidenheim Mittelfr.
  - 9834 Theilenhofen
  - 9836 Gunzenhausen-Cronheim
  - 9837 Haundorf
- 984
  - 9841 Bad Windsheim
  - 9842 Uffenheim
  - 9843 Burgbernheim
  - 9844 Obernzenn
  - 9845 Oberdachstetten
  - 9846 Ipsheim
  - 9847 Ergersheim
  - 9848 Simmershofen
- 985
  - 9851 Dinkelsbühl
  - 9852 Feuchtwangen
  - 9853 Wilburgstetten
  - 9854 Wittelshofen
  - 9855 Dentlein am Forst
  - 9856 Dürrwangen
  - 9857 Schopfloch Mittelfr.
- 986
  - 9861 Rothenburg ob der Tauber
  - 9865 Adelshofen
  - 9867 Geslau
  - 9868 Schillingsfürst
  - 9869 Wettringen Mittelfr.
- 987
  - 9871 Windsbach
  - 9872 Heilsbronn
  - 9873 Abenberg-Wassermungenau
  - 9874 Neuendettelsau
  - 9875 Wolframs-Eschenbach
  - 9876 Rohr Mittelfr.

=== 99 ===
- 990
  - 9901 Hengersberg
  - 9903 Schöllnach
  - 9904 Lalling
  - 9905 Bernried Niederbayern
  - 9906 Mariaposching
  - 9907 Zenting
  - 9908 Schöfweg
- 991 Deggendorf
- 992
  - 9920 Bischofsmais
  - 9921 Regen
  - 9922 Zwiesel
  - 9923 Teisnach
  - 9924 Bodenmais
  - 9925 Bayerisch Eisenstein
  - 9926 Frauenau
  - 9927 Kirchberg im Wald
  - 9928 Kirchdorf im Wald
  - 9929 Ruhmannsfelden
- 993
  - 9931 Plattling
  - 9932 Osterhofen
  - 9933 Wallersdorf
  - 9935 Stephansposching
  - 9936 Wallerfing
  - 9937 Oberpöring
  - 9938 Moos Niederbayern
- 994
  - 9941 Bad Kötzting
  - 9942 Viechtach
  - 9943 Lam Oberpf.
  - 9944 Miltach
  - 9945 Arnbruck
  - 9946 Hohenwarth bei Kötzting
  - 9947 Neukirchen beim Heiligen Blut
  - 9948 Eschlkam
- 995
  - 9951 Landau an der Isar
  - 9952 Eichendorf
  - 9953 Pilsting
  - 9954 Simbach Niederbayern
  - 9955 Mamming
- 996
  - 9961 Mitterfels
  - 9962 Schwarzach (Niederbayern).
  - 9963 Konzell
  - 9964 Stallwang
  - 9965 Sankt Englmar
  - 9966 Wiesenfelden
- 997
  - 9971 Cham
  - 9972 Waldmünchen
  - 9973 Furth im Wald
  - 9974 Traitsching
  - 9975 Waldmünchen-Geigant
  - 9976 Rötz
  - 9977 Arnschwang
  - 9978 Schönthal (Oberpfalz)

== See also ==
- Telephone numbers in Germany
