= Ehingen (electoral district) =

State electoral district of Germany

65: Ehingen
- Electoral district for the Landtag of Baden-Württemberg
- Ehingen in 2026
- District: Alb-Donau-Kreis
- Electorate: 105,362 (2026)
- Major settlements: Allmendingen, Altheim, Altheim (Alb), Amstetten, Asselfingen, Ballendorf, Beimerstetten, Berghülen, Bernstadt, Blaubeuren, Börslingen, Breitingen, Dornstadt, Ehingen (Donau), Emeringen, Emerkingen, Griesingen, Grundsheim, Hausen am Bussen, Heroldstatt, Holzkirch, Laichingen, Langenau, Lauterach, Lonsee, Merklingen, Munderkingen, Neenstetten, Nellingen, Nerenstetten, Oberdischingen, Obermarchtal, Oberstadion, Öllingen, Öpfingen, Rammingen, Rechtenstein, Rottenacker, Schelklingen, Setzingen, Untermarchtal, Unterstadion, Unterwachingen, Weidenstetten, Westerheim, and Westerstetten

Current electoral district
- Party: CDU
- Member: Manuel Hagel

Ehingen is an electoral constituency (German: Wahlkreis) represented in the Landtag of Baden-Württemberg.

Since 2026, it has elected one member via first-past-the-post voting. Voters cast a second vote under which additional seats are allocated proportionally state-wide. Under the constituency numbering system, it is designated as constituency 65.

It is wholly within the district of Alb-Donau-Kreis.

== Geography ==
The constituency includes the municipalities of Allmendingen, Altheim, Altheim (Alb), Amstetten, Asselfingen, Ballendorf, Beimerstetten, Berghülen, Bernstadt, Blaubeuren, Börslingen, Breitingen, Dornstadt, Ehingen (Donau), Emeringen, Emerkingen, Griesingen, Grundsheim, Hausen am Bussen, Heroldstatt, Holzkirch, Laichingen, Langenau, Lauterach, Lonsee, Merklingen, Munderkingen, Neenstetten, Nellingen, Nerenstetten, Oberdischingen, Obermarchtal, Oberstadion, Öllingen, Öpfingen, Rammingen, Rechtenstein, Rottenacker, Schelklingen, Setzingen, Untermarchtal, Unterstadion, Unterwachingen, Weidenstetten, Westerheim, and Westerstetten within the district of Alb-Donau-Kreis.

There were 105,362 eligible voters in 2026.

== Members ==
=== First mandate ===
Both prior to and since the electoral reforms for the 2026 election, the winner of the plurality of the vote (first-past-the-post) in every constituency won the first mandate.

Election	Member	Party	%
1976	Ventur Schöttle	CDU	
1980	Ventur Schöttle	CDU	
1984	Ventur Schöttle	CDU	
1988	Ventur Schöttle	CDU	
1992	Ventur Schöttle	CDU	
1996	Karl Traub	CDU	
2001	Karl Traub	CDU	53.5
2006	Karl Traub	CDU	54.6
2011	Karl Traub	CDU	51.0
2016	Manuel Hagel	CDU	36.2
2021	Manuel Hagel	CDU	35.9
2026	Manuel Hagel	CDU	47.1

=== Second mandate ===
Prior to the electoral reforms for the 2026 election, the seats in the state parliament were allocated proportionately amongst parties which received more than 5% of valid votes across the state. The seats that were won proportionally for parties that did not win as many first mandates as seats they were entitled to, were allocated to their candidates which received the highest proportion of the vote in their respective constituencies. This meant that following some elections, a constituency would have one or more members elected under a second mandate.

Prior to 2011, these second mandates were allocated to the party candidates who got the greatest number of votes, whilst from 2011-2021, these were allocated according to percentage share of the vote.

This constituency only returned a second mandate member to the Landtag in 2016.

Election	Member	Party
2016	Daniel Rottmann	AfD

== Election results ==
=== 2026 election ===
State election (2026): Ehingen
Notes:	Blue background denotes the winner of the electorate vote. Pink background denotes a candidate elected from their party list. Yellow background denotes an electorate win by a list member, or other incumbent. A ✓ or ✗ denotes status of any incumbent, win or lose respectively.						
Party	Candidate	Votes	%	±%	Party votes	%	±%
CDU	✓ Manuel Hagel	36,499	47.1	▲11.1	31,490	40.6	▲4.7
AfD	Michael Scheffler	15,552	20.1	▲9.9	16,435	21.2	▲11.1
Greens	Tobias Hocke-Beck	13,690	17.7	▼11.8	17,259	22.3	▼7.2
SPD	Lisa-Marie Späth	4,368	5.6	▼1.4	3,003	3.9	▼3.1
Left	Nicklas Boden	2,156	2.8	▲0.7	1,677	2.2	Steady
FDP	Uwe Schwarz	2,145	2.8	▼5.4	2,743	3.5	▼4.6
FW	Ulrich Stoll	2,144	2.8	▼0.7	1,593	2.1	▼1.4
BSW	Markus Treß	758	1.0		993	1.3	
APT					773	1.0	
Volt					361	0.5	
PARTEI					246	0.3	
Bündnis Deutschland	Manfred Spähn	219	0.3				
Bündnis C					188	0.2	
Values					145	0.2	
Pensioners					141	0.2	
dieBasis					121	0.2	▼1.0
ÖDP					112	0.1	▼0.7
Team Todenhöfer					79	0.1	
Verjüngungsforschung					61	0.1	
PdF					49	0.1	
Humanists					31	0.0	
KlimalisteBW					28	0.0	▼0.6
Informal votes		548			551		
Total valid votes		77,531			77,528		
Turnout		78,079	74.4	▲7.9			
CDU hold	Majority	20,947	27.0				

== See also ==
- Politics of Baden-Württemberg
- Landtag of Baden-Württemberg
