= Westerstetten =

- Municipality
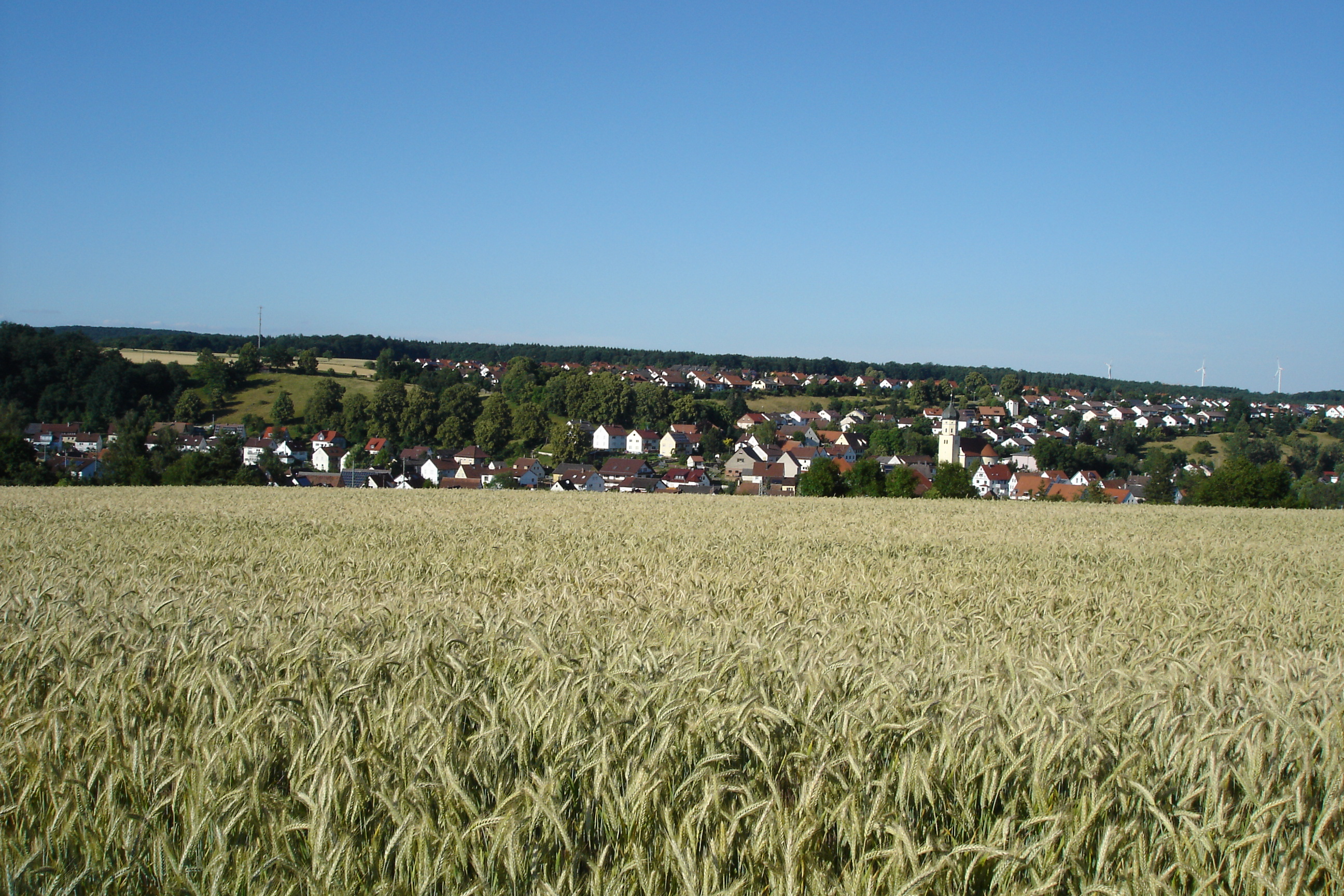

- Coat of arms

- Location of Westerstetten within Alb-Donau-Kreis district
- Interactive map of Westerstetten
- Location within Germany Location within Baden-Württemberg
- Coordinates: 48°31′13″N 9°57′19″E
- Country: Germany
- State: Baden-Württemberg
- Admin. region: Tübingen
- District: Alb-Donau-Kreis

Government
  - Mayor (2018–26): Alexander Bourke

Area
  - Total: 13.1 km^{2} (5.1 sq mi)
- Elevation: 544 m (1,785 ft)

Population (2025-12-31)
  - Total: 2,117
  - Density: 162/km^{2} (419/sq mi)
- Time zone: UTC+01:00 (CET)
  - Summer (DST): UTC+02:00 (CEST)
- Postal codes: 89198
- Dialling codes: 0731, 07348 and 07336
- Vehicle registration: UL
- Website: www.westerstetten.de

Westerstetten (German pronunciation: [vɛstɐˈʃtɛtn̩]; Swabian: Weschdrschdett) is a village in the district of Alb-Donau in Baden-Württemberg in Germany.

== Geography ==
Westerstetten is situated in the Lone valley (Lonetal) in the Swabian Jura roughly 10 km (6 mi) north of Ulm.

=== Neighbouring villages ===
The neighbouring villages are, to the east, Holzkirch and Breitingen; to the south, Beimerstetten; to the southwest, Dornstadt; and to the northwest, Lonsee.

=== Structure ===
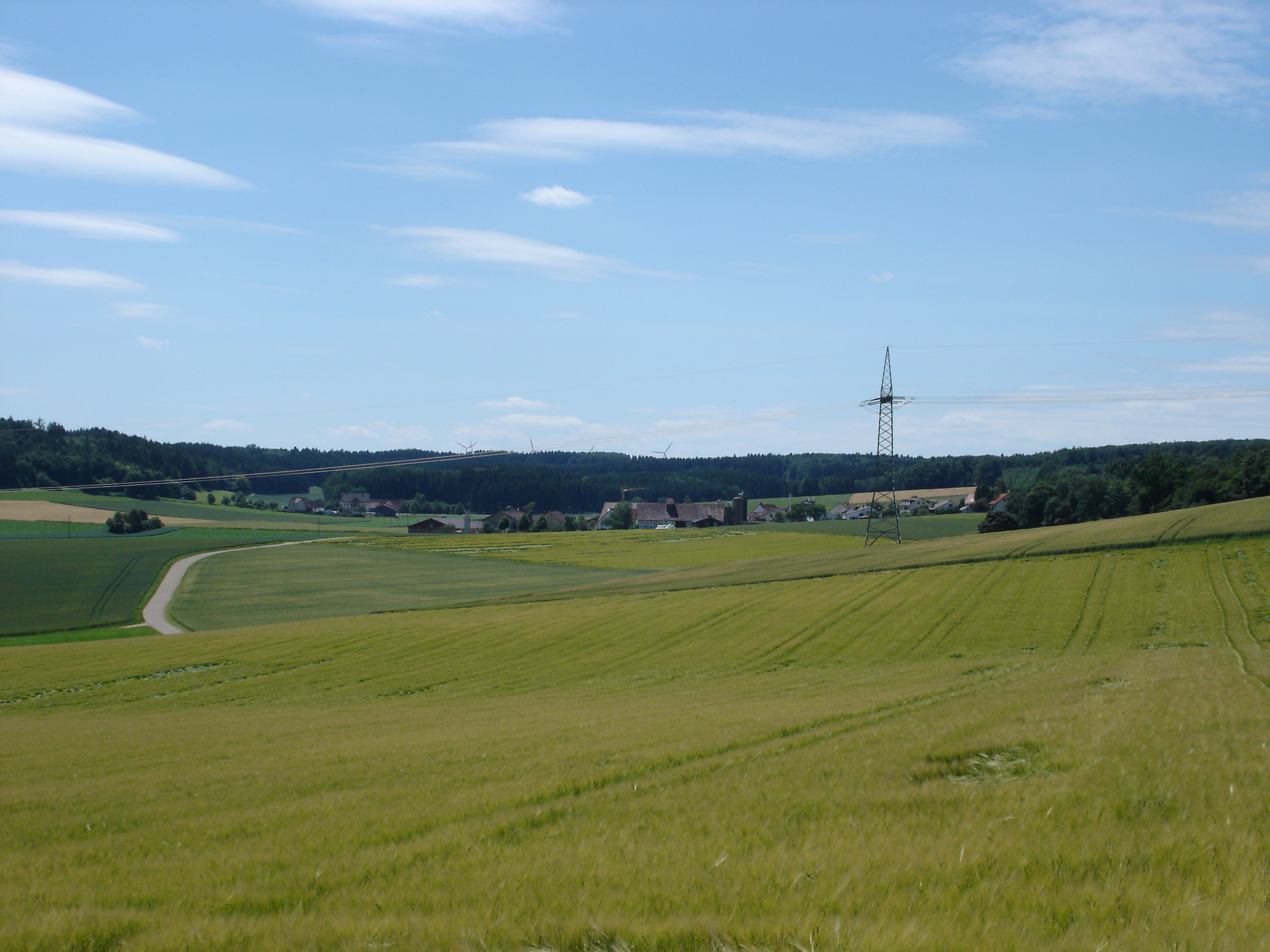
View of Hinterdenkental

Villages incorporated to Westerstetten are Birkhof, Hinterdenkental and Vorderdenkental.

== History ==
=== Early history ===
The Lone valley with its caves was a popular settlement area in the Stone Age. Westerstetten itself however has no caves, and there have been no significant finds of this period.

=== Roman period ===
Since 75 AD a Roman road connected the Ad Lunam castle in Lonsee-Urspring with Aquilea at Heidenheim. As part of the Alb Limes, this road marked for some time the external border of the Roman Empire.

=== Late-Middleages ===
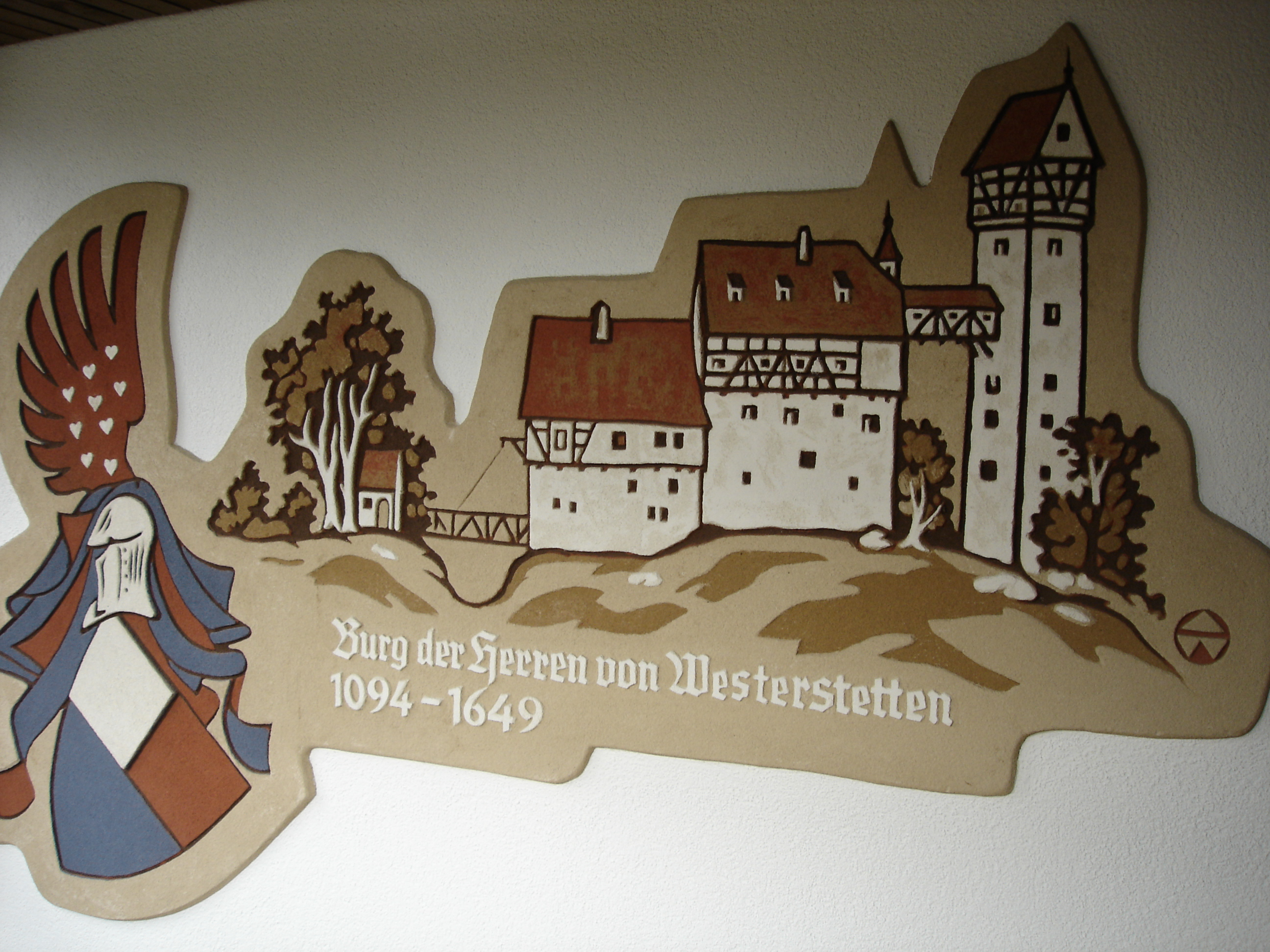
Reconstructed view of Westerstetten Castle along with the emblem. Sgraffito in the Westerstetten Townhall.

=== 1414 onwards ===
From 1414 to 1803, Westerstetten was part of the territory of Elchingen Abbey. When the abbey was dissolved in 1803 as part of the German Mediatisation, the village became part of Bavaria along with Elchingen. In 1810 the border between Bavaria and Württemberg was re-negotiated and Westerstetten became part of Württemberg.

At the end of the Second World War, Westerstetten was liberated by American troops in April 1945. The Jewish graves in the cemetery hold the bodies of eight Nazi concentration camp victims that were hastily buried in the Gurgelhaus forest, shortly before the end of the war.

The local government reform of 1975 allowed Westerstetten to retain its independence. The designation of new building zones and its vicinity to Ulm helped it to grow to over 2,000 inhabitants.

== Buildings and Landmarks ==
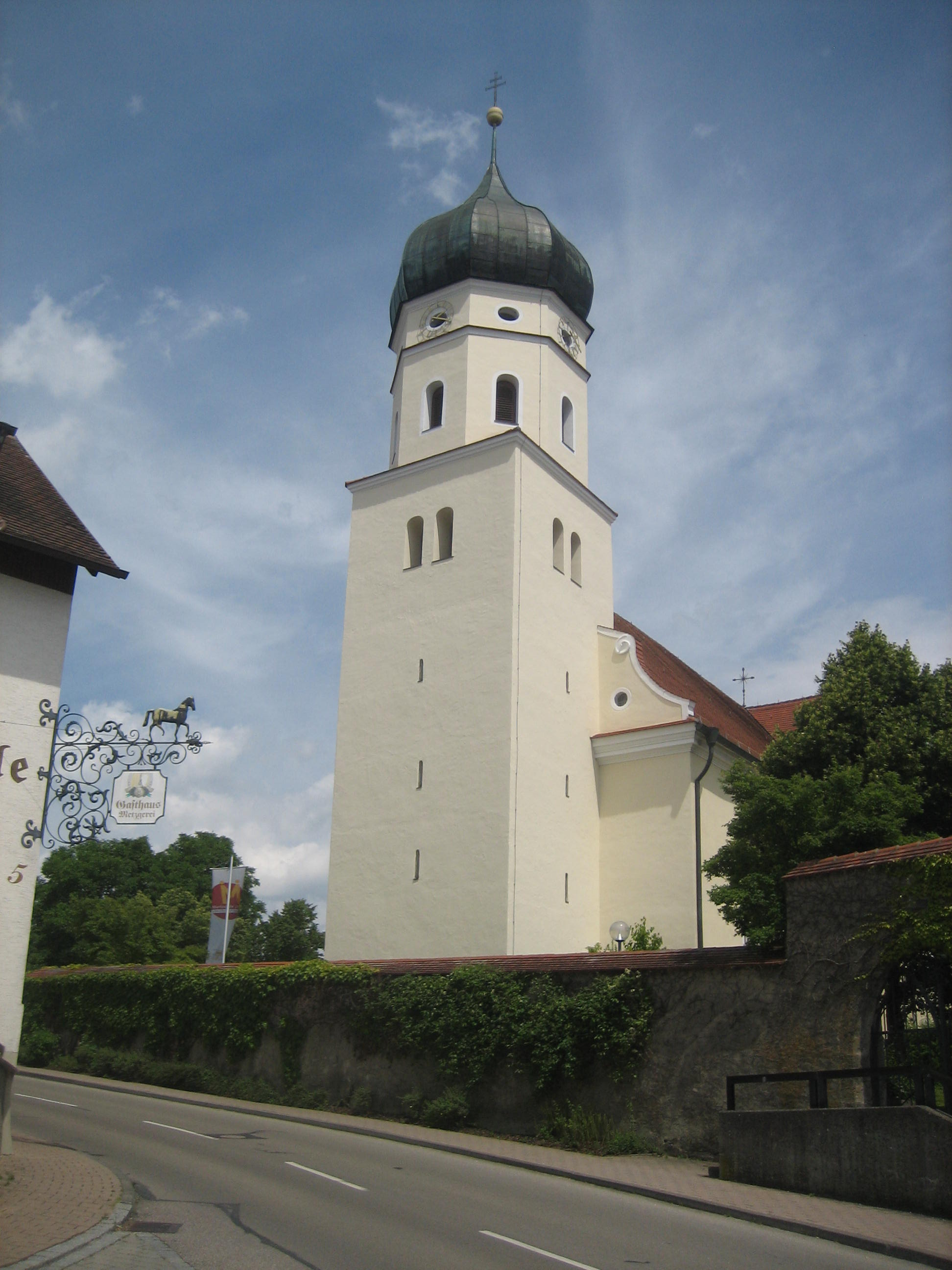
St. Martins Church

- St. Martin's Church in Westerstetten
- Parish Church of St. Martin
- Located in the center of St. Martin's Church is the jewel of the municipality. The significant late Baroque building was probably built in the years 1717 to 1721 according to plans of Elchinger Abbey master-builder Christian Wiedemann. The substructure of the tower dates back to 13-14th century, the onion spire was placed in 1710. 1892 the church was painted in barock style: The main ceiling painting shows the admission of Virgin Mary into heaven, the ceiling painting of the ship shows the church patron St. Martin dividing his coat. In 1983 the church got a new peal of four bells. [3] . Since July 2008, a new organ on the two rear galleries is installed.
- Kreuzberg with Calvary

The Stations of the Cross on the Kreuzberg were created in 1868 and inaugurated in February 1869. In 1947, today's Kreuzberg Chapel was built to replace an earlier building.

- New town hall

The new city hall was inaugurated 1984.

- Railway Museum in Old Station

After the establishment of a new station in 2005 the old station was acquired by the municipality. It was renovated till 2007 by the modellers Westerstetten. A small railway museum documents the regional history of the station and the railway system.

== Transportation ==
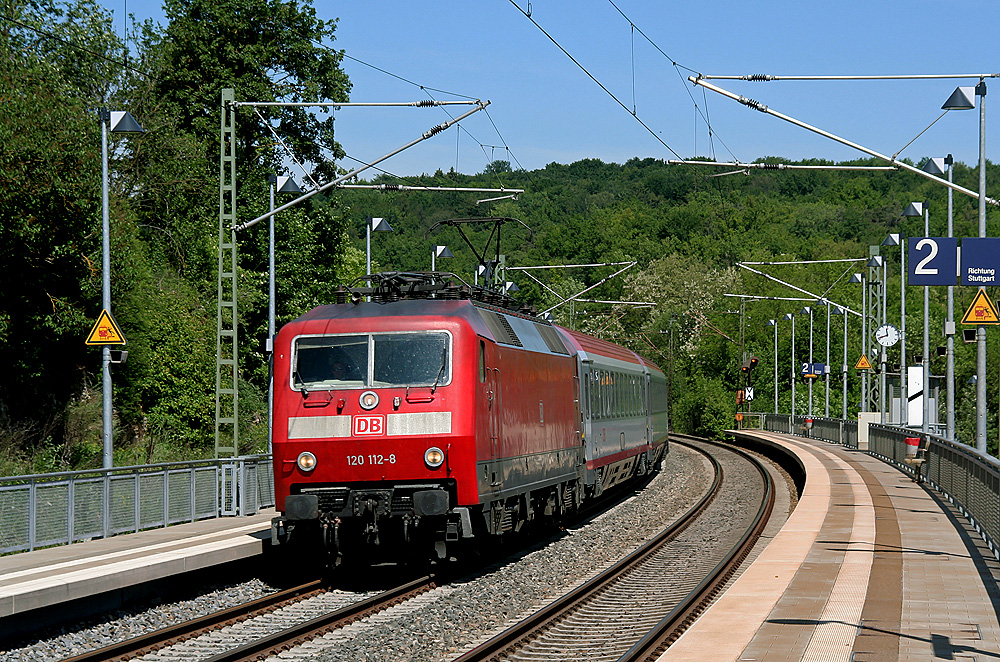

A Euro City crosses the Westerstetten Station

Westerstetten lies on the railway line Stuttgart-Ulm (Fils Valley Railway and has since August 2005 the newly built railway station, which replaces the previous station. Every hour run regional trains to Ulm and Geislingen.

Railway underpass into Ulmer valley from 1848 To cross the railway line there are on Westerstetten district four possibilities: The railway bridge between the Birkhof and Vorderdenkental; 1994 renewed underpass at the entrance; the original dating from 1848, but open only for agricultural transport, cyclists and pedestrians underpass to Ulm Valley; and also from 1848 originating pedestrian underpass with stairs. At the national road network Westerstetten is well served by the national road B 10.

== Economics ==
Until well into the 20th century Westerstetten was agricultural. Today in Westerstetten and the part places exist a few agricultural full-time farms. Much of the working people work in other areas and benefit as commuters from the good road and rail connections to Ulm. Westerstetten has numerous long-established and newly established craft and service businesses. The most visible companies is the quarry near the old station.

== Clubs and organizations ==
- Musical associations
- Gesangsverein Vorderdenkental eV (mixed chorus)
- Liederkranz Westerstetten eV (mixed chorus)
- Musikverein Westerstetten eV (youth band and band)
- Protestant church brass
- Katholischer Kirhencor St. Martin (youth choir and mixed choir)
- Clubs with sporting activities
- Gun club Westerstetten
- Schwäbischer Albverein
- TSV Westerstetten
- Additional clubs
- BUND Ortsgruppe Westerstetten
- Volunteer Fire Westerstetten
- Country Women's Association Westerstetten
- Model train friends Westerstetten
- Motorcycle friends Westerstetten

== Sports ==
Westerstetten has several sports facilities, which are operated or used by clubs or are available to the public.

- Lonetalhalle (multi-purpose hall and at the same hall of Primary School)
- Sports ground with clubhouse of TSV Westerstetten and various outdoor sports facilities, including football pitch, triple fistball course, tennis courts, beach volleyball court and mini golf course.
- Schützenhaus the shooting club Westerstetten
- Bowling alley in the Lonetalhalle
- Moreover, the varied landscape in the Lone Valley and the adjoining heights offers an ideal environment for hiking, cycling, jogging, Nordic walking and in good snow conditions in winter even cross-country skiing.

== Education ==
In Westerstetten there is a kindergarten, and a primary school. Schools are located in Dornstadt (elementary and secondary school) and in Ulm (all school types).

== Religious associations ==
By belonging to the monastery Elchingen Westerstetten is traditionally predominantly Catholic, while the three districts Birkhof, front and Hinterdenkental predominantly are Protestant.

== Freemen ==
- Monsignore Ernst Tatarko (catholic parson of the village 1958–2001); died 5 August 2013
- Hermann Krieger (mayor 1987–2011)

== Notable people ==
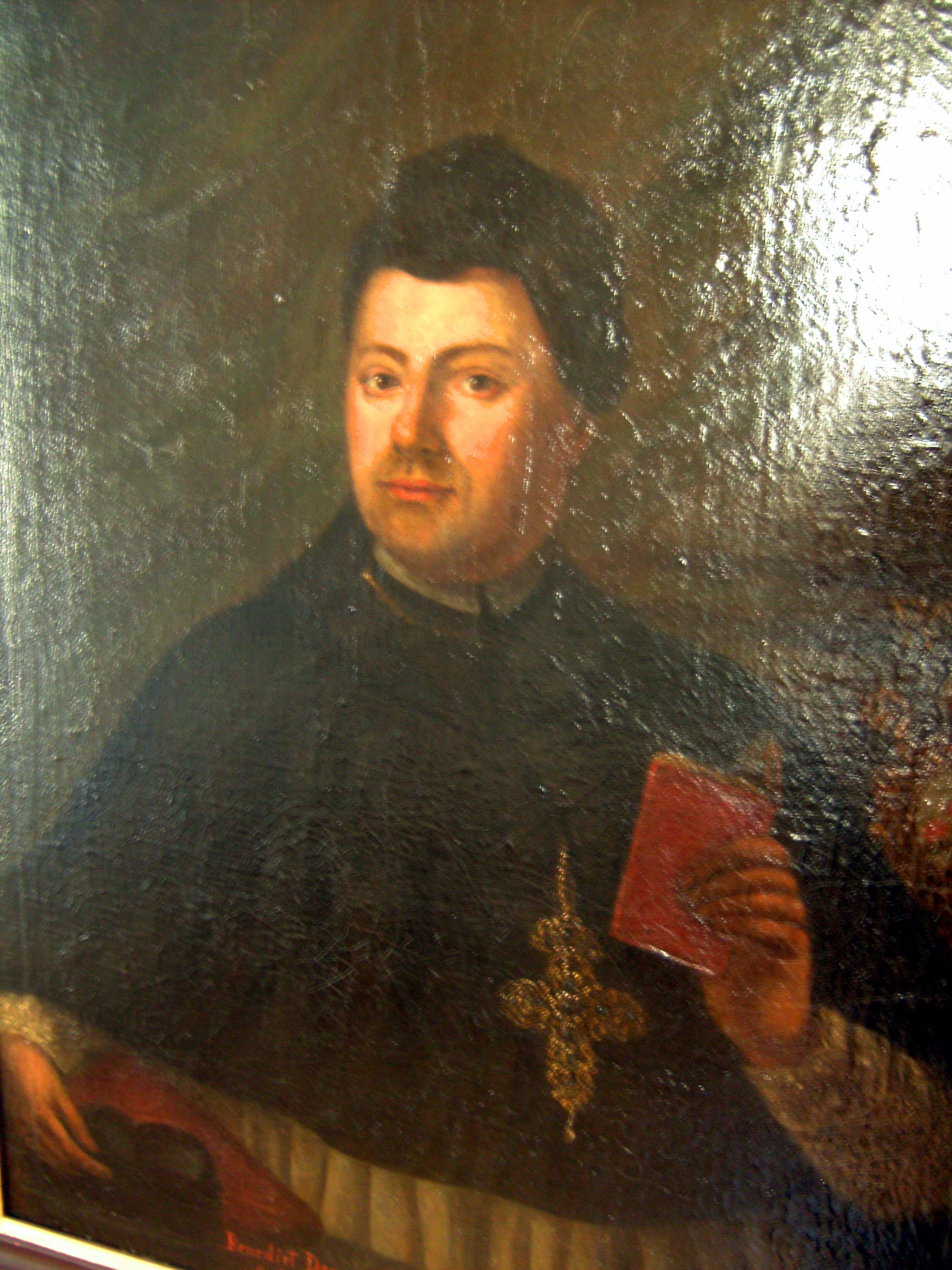
Benedikt Denzel

- Heinrich von Westerstetten (about 1355), Württembergian noble
- Benedikt Denzel OSB, (1692–1767), abbot of imperial abbey Ochsenhausen
