= Neenstetten =

- Municipality
- Coat of arms

- Location of Neenstetten within Alb-Donau-Kreis district
- Interactive map of Neenstetten
- Location within Germany Location within Baden-Württemberg
- Coordinates: 48°32′50″N 10°1′9″E
- Country: Germany
- State: Baden-Württemberg
- Admin. region: Tübingen
- District: Alb-Donau-Kreis

Government
  - Mayor (2023–31): Tobias Dürr

Area
  - Total: 8.30 km^{2} (3.20 sq mi)
- Elevation: 572 m (1,877 ft)

Population (2025-12-31)
  - Total: 822
  - Density: 99.0/km^{2} (257/sq mi)
- Time zone: UTC+01:00 (CET)
  - Summer (DST): UTC+02:00 (CEST)
- Postal codes: 89189
- Dialling codes: 07340
- Vehicle registration: UL
- Website: www.neenstetten.de

Neenstetten is a municipality in the district of Alb-Donau in Baden-Württemberg in Germany.

Neenstetten is located on the southern edge of the Swabian Alb on a ridge above the Lonetal, about 18 kilometers north of Ulm and ten kilometers west of Langenau.

== Neighboring communities ==
The municipality borders on Altheim (Alb), on the east by Börslingen, south to Bernstadt (Alb) and Holzkirch, and on the west by Weidenstetten.

== History ==
Neenstetten was first mentioned in the year 1255. The place belonged ecclesiastically initially to Weidenstetten. After the Reformation Neenstetten became a separate parish. The early Gothic choir tower plant received its characteristic onion dome to collapse of the Tower 1730. The nave dates from the 15th century; it has wall paintings from that time.

== Economy and Infrastructure ==
Neenstetten has from the 1950s agriculturally developed structured village for living and working community. In about 25 commercial farms currently about 500 workers are employed. There are also 15 part-time farms.

== Demographics ==
Population development:

Year	Inhabitants
1990	721
2001	814
2011	808
2021	845

== Companies ==
Gebr. Binder Metallwarenfabrik GmbH, Automotive

== Education ==
In Neenstetten there is a kindergarten, but no school. Elementary school students go to primary school in Weidenstetten, two kilometers away. Main students attend the high school association in Altheim. Schools are in Langenau and Ulm.

== Personalities ==
- Gerhard Staib, since 1985 12 years of volunteer and 14 years of full-time mayor was (honorary citizen since June 21, 2011).
- Eberhardt Renz (born in Neenstetten May 1, 1935) is a Protestant minister and was from 1994 to 2001 bishop of the Evangelical Lutheran Church in Württemberg.

== Literature ==
Gerd Zillhardt (Hg.): The Thirty Years' War in contemporary representation. Hans Heberle "Zeytregister" (1618-1672). Records from the Ulmer territory. A contribution to history and historical understanding of the lower classes (research into the history of the city of Ulm, Vol. 13), Ulm 1975 (in German)
