= Emerkingen =

- Municipality
- Coat of arms

- Location of Emerkingen within Alb-Donau-Kreis district
- Interactive map of Emerkingen
- Location within Germany Location within Baden-Württemberg
- Coordinates: 48°12′42″N 9°39′22″E
- Country: Germany
- State: Baden-Württemberg
- Admin. region: Tübingen
- District: Alb-Donau-Kreis

Government
  - Mayor (2023–31): Paul Burger

Area
  - Total: 7.40 km^{2} (2.86 sq mi)
- Elevation: 531 m (1,742 ft)

Population (2025-12-31)
  - Total: 820
  - Density: 110/km^{2} (290/sq mi)
- Time zone: UTC+01:00 (CET)
  - Summer (DST): UTC+02:00 (CEST)
- Postal codes: 89607
- Dialling codes: 07393
- Vehicle registration: UL
- Website: www.emerkingen.de

Emerkingen in Alb-Donau-Kreis

Emerkingen is a municipality in the district of Alb-Donau in Baden-Württemberg in Germany.

== Geography ==
Emerkingen is situated on a hill on the southern edge of the Danube valley, about 35 km southwest of Ulm.

== Neighboring communities ==
The municipality borders to the north to the town of Munderkingen, on the east to Unterstadion, on the south to Oberstadion and Unterwachingen and in the west to Hausen am Bussen. (all Alb-Donau-Kreis).

== History ==
In Roman times was located on the territory of the present municipality a cohort fort together with associated vicus. It was built around 45 a. Chr. From the middle of the 1st to the middle of the 2nd century a brickyard was operated. Approximately half a kilometer south of it, at the site of the municipality center of Emerkingen, developed later an Alemannic settlement. Emerkingen was first mentioned in the Latin form "in Antarmarhingas" in a deed of 805, given by the counts Cadolah of Friuli and Wago to the Abbey of St. Gall. The village was eponymous for the barons of Emerkingen. Their medieval castle was demolished in 1870. Only the "Roman Tower" still exists.

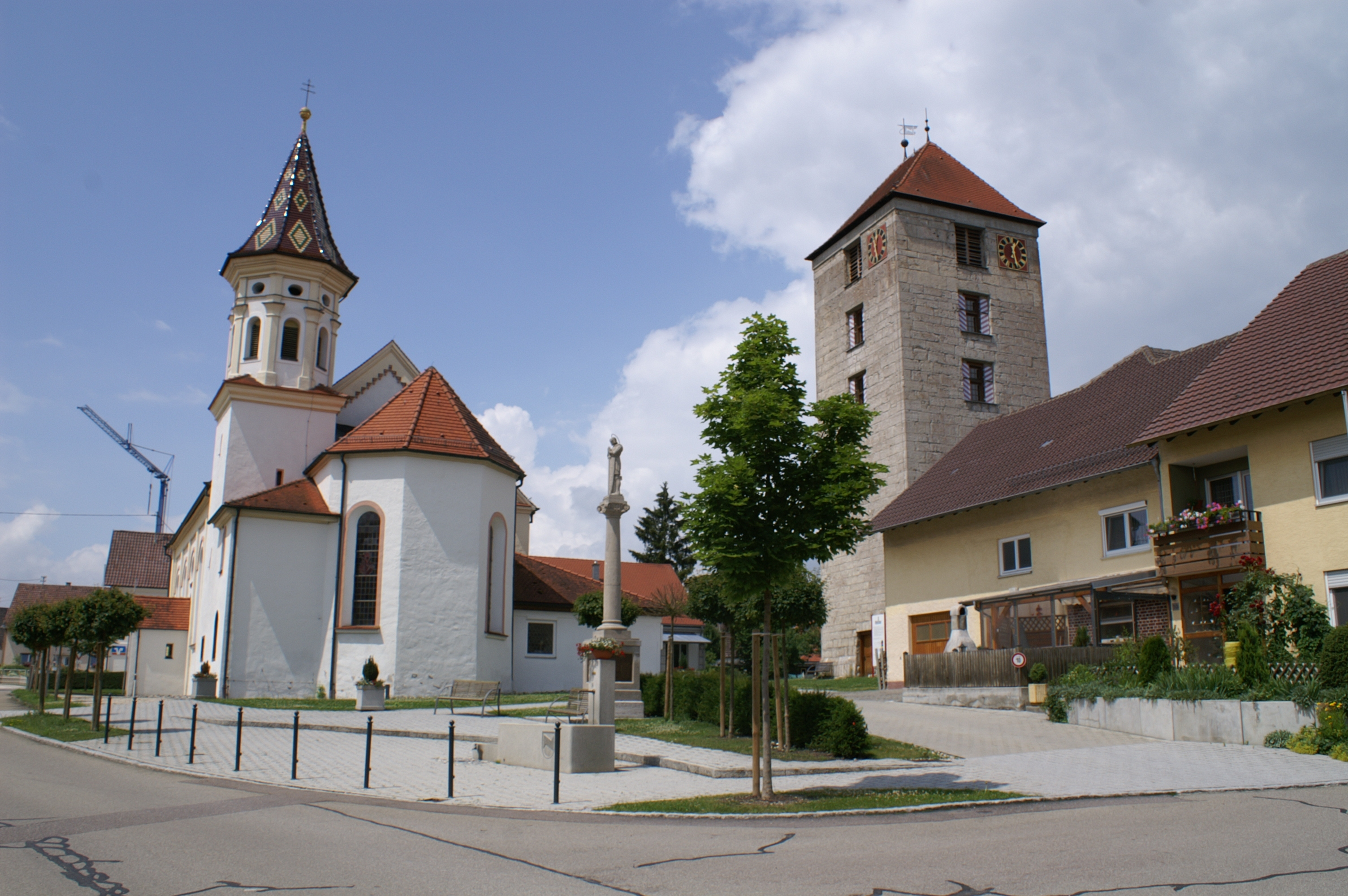
Emerkingen center with church and Roman tower

== Religions ==
On July 7, 1103 was ordained with the Burgkapelle the first church. Since May 3, 1900 Emerkingen is the seat of a catholic rectory.

== Museum ==
The local museum is in the "Roman Tower".
