= Holzkirch =

- Municipality
- Coat of arms

- Location of Holzkirch within Alb-Donau-Kreis district
- Interactive map of Holzkirch
- Location within Germany Location within Baden-Württemberg
- Coordinates: 48°31′50″N 9°59′43″E
- Country: Germany
- State: Baden-Württemberg
- Admin. region: Tübingen
- District: Alb-Donau-Kreis

Government
  - Mayor (2018–26): Paul Seybold

Area
  - Total: 8.14 km^{2} (3.14 sq mi)
- Elevation: 579 m (1,900 ft)

Population (2025-12-31)
  - Total: 265
  - Density: 32.6/km^{2} (84.3/sq mi)
- Time zone: UTC+01:00 (CET)
  - Summer (DST): UTC+02:00 (CEST)
- Postal codes: 89183
- Dialling codes: 07340
- Vehicle registration: UL
- Website: www.holzkirch.de

Holzkirch is a small municipality in the Alb-Donau-Kreis in Baden-Württemberg, Germany. The community belongs to the administration unit Langenau.

== Geography ==
Holzkirch is located on the southern edge of the Swabian Jura north of the Lone valley and north of Ulm.

== Neighboring communities ==
The municipality borders to Weidenstetten, on the east to Neenstetten, in the southeast to Bernstadt, on the south to Breitingen and on the west to Westerstetten.

== History ==
Holzkirch was first documented in 1362 and came 1385 into the possession of the imperial city of Ulm. As Ulm 1803 lost its status, the place came from Ulm to Bavaria. The border between Bavaria and Württemberg in 1810 finally laid down in a contract and Holzkirch became part of Württemberg.

== Things ==
St. Barbara's Church

== Buildings ==
The late Romanesque Barbara Church tower from around 1150 offered around the village for the population protection in troubled times. The very massive cemetery wall was probably for defense.

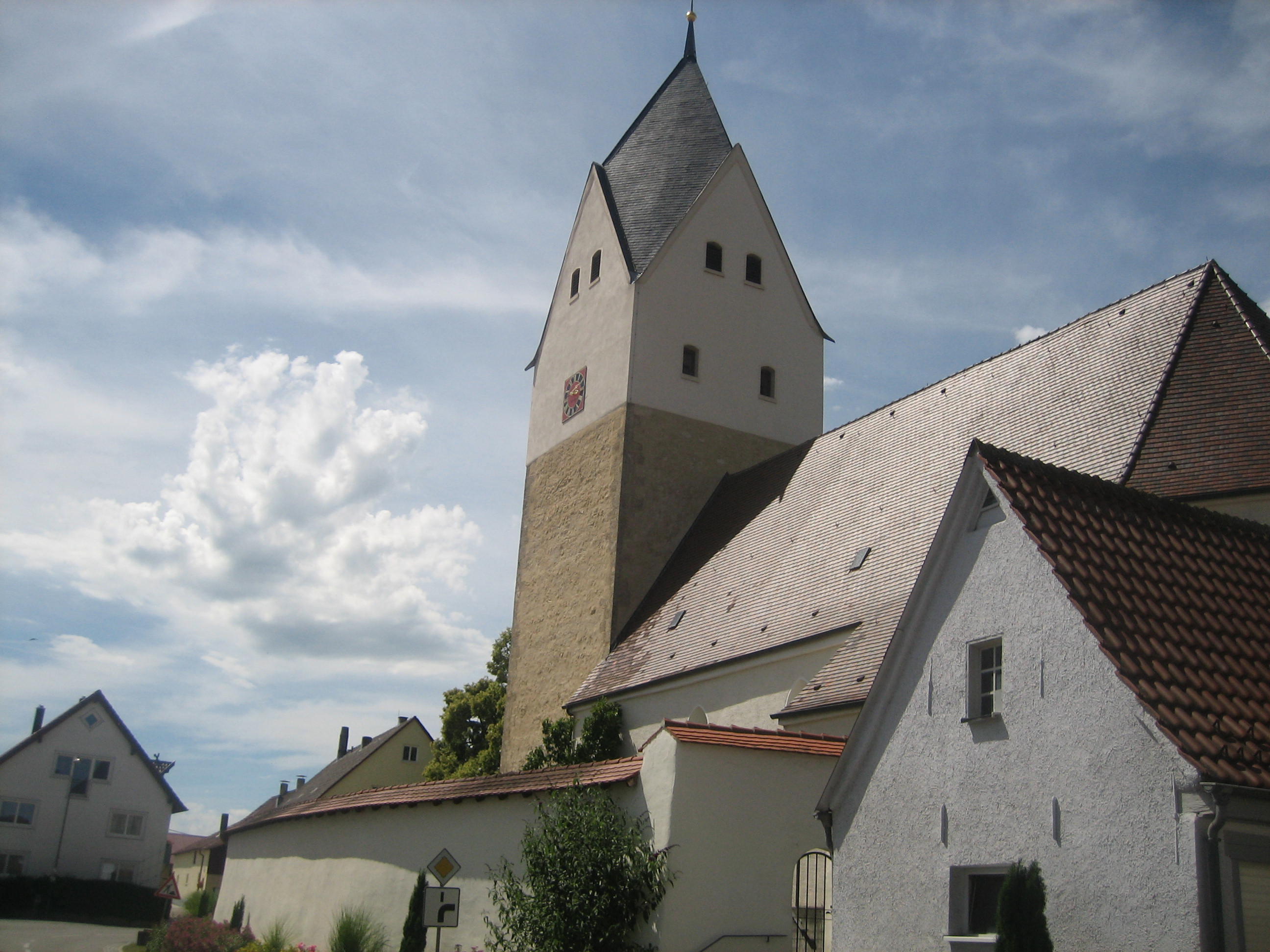
St. Barbara Kirche Holzkirch

see also Castle Holzkirch
