= Oberdischingen =

- Municipality
- Coat of arms

- Location of Oberdischingen within Alb-Donau-Kreis district
- Interactive map of Oberdischingen
- Location within Germany Location within Baden-Württemberg
- Coordinates: 48°18′9″N 9°49′44″E
- Country: Germany
- State: Baden-Württemberg
- Admin. region: Tübingen
- District: Alb-Donau-Kreis

Government
  - Mayor (2024–32): Wolfgang Schmauder (CDU)

Area
  - Total: 8.84 km^{2} (3.41 sq mi)
- Elevation: 483 m (1,585 ft)

Population (2025-12-31)
  - Total: 2,344
  - Density: 265/km^{2} (687/sq mi)
- Time zone: UTC+01:00 (CET)
  - Summer (DST): UTC+02:00 (CEST)
- Postal codes: 89610
- Dialling codes: 07305
- Vehicle registration: UL
- Website: www.oberdischingen.de

Oberdischingen is a municipality in Alb-Donau-Kreis in Baden-Württemberg.

== Geography ==
=== Geographical location ===
Oberdischingen is located on the Danube between Ehingen (9 km) and Ulm (18 km).

=== Neighbouring communities ===
The municipality is bordering to the north by to the district Niederhofen of Allmendingen, to the east and south to the city of Erbach and to the west to Öpfingen.

== Demographics ==
Population development:

Year	Inhabitants
1990	1,754
2001	1,940
2011	2,048
2021	2,245

== History ==
Oberdischingen was first mentioned in documents in 1148. The as Malefizschenk known Franz Ludwig Schenk von Castell (1736–1821) built here his prison. Most famous inmate of the prison was the Vagantin and crook Elisabetha Gaßner, which was executed here on January 17, 1788. In 1806 Oberdischingen – like the entire area – came to Württemberg.

== Religions ==
Since 1275 Oberdischingen has its own parish. Oberdischingen is predominantly Catholic.

== Politics ==
=== Mayors ===
- 1930 years: Josef Schlick
- 1948–1952: Erich Klumpp
- 1952–1956: Vincent Ströbele
- 1956–1983: Alois Speiser
- 1983–1997: Hans Balleisen
- 1997–2014: Benno Droste
- 2014–2024: Friedrich Nägele
- Since 2024: Wolfgang Schmauder

== Traffic ==
Oberdischingen is connected by the Bundesstraße 311 to the national road network.

== Educational institutions ==
Oberdischingen has a primary, and Werkrealschule.

== Leisure and sports facilities ==
In Oberdischingen there are two football fields and four tennis courts.

== Things ==
Oberdischingen is located on the Upper Swabian Baroque Route. The exceptional historic center is well worth seeing: Houses in French baroque Mansard – style were built by Franz Ludwig Count Schenk von Castell (1736–1821).
