= Setzingen =

- Municipality
- Coat of arms

- Location of Setzingen within Alb-Donau-Kreis district
- Interactive map of Setzingen
- Location within Germany Location within Baden-Württemberg
- Coordinates: 48°32′17″N 10°7′51″E
- Country: Germany
- State: Baden-Württemberg
- Admin. region: Tübingen
- District: Alb-Donau-Kreis

Government
  - Mayor (2021–29): Johannes Knippfeld

Area
  - Total: 8.42 km^{2} (3.25 sq mi)
- Elevation: 501 m (1,644 ft)

Population (2025-12-31)
  - Total: 748
  - Density: 88.8/km^{2} (230/sq mi)
- Time zone: UTC+01:00 (CET)
  - Summer (DST): UTC+02:00 (CEST)
- Postal codes: 89129
- Dialling codes: 07345
- Vehicle registration: UL
- Website: www.setzingen.de

Setzingen in Alb-Donau-District

Setzingen (German pronunciation: [ˈzɛtsɪŋən]) is a village in the district of Alb-Donau in Baden-Württemberg in Germany.

== Geography ==
Setzingen is located on the southern slope of the Swabian Jura on the outskirts of the Lone valley, about 5 kilometers north of Langenau and 20 kilometers northeast of Ulm.

== Neighboring communities ==
The municipality borders to the Hausen district of the city Herbrechtingen, to the Heidenheim district, to the east to Öllingen, on the south by Nerenstetten and on the west by Ballendorf.

== History ==
Setzingen is mentioned the first time in 1143 as the monastery Anhausen an der Brenz.

== Religions ==
In Setzingen since the 12th century, there is a church. Since the reformation, the place is evangelical.

== Military ==
In the forest area "Ballhart" northwest of Setzingen the Bundeswehr operates an ammunition dump. On the site there is also a radio tower (55 m high) in reinforced concrete. (coordinates: 48 ° 33 '27 "N, 10 ° 6' 33" O).

== Buildings ==
The Bartholomew church in the center is worth seeing. The baptismal bell from the 14th century and the wooden baptismal font from 1762 are also worth seeing.
