= Ballendorf (disambiguation) =

Ballendorf may refer to:

- Ballendorf, a municipality in the Alb-Donau district, in Baden-Württemberg, Germany
- Dirk Ballendorf (1939–2013), American-born Guamanian historian and professor of Micronesian studies

== See also ==
- Bollendorf-Pont, a village in the commune of Berdorf, in eastern Luxembourg
