= Öllingen =

- Municipality
- Coat of arms

- Location of Öllingen within Alb-Donau-Kreis district
- Interactive map of Öllingen
- Location within Germany Location within Baden-Württemberg
- Coordinates: 48°31′40″N 10°8′51″E
- Country: Germany
- State: Baden-Württemberg
- Admin. region: Tübingen
- District: Alb-Donau-Kreis

Government
  - Mayor (2020–24): Georg Göggelmann

Area
  - Total: 8.09 km^{2} (3.12 sq mi)
- Elevation: 536 m (1,759 ft)

Population (2025-12-31)
  - Total: 551
  - Density: 68.1/km^{2} (176/sq mi)
- Time zone: UTC+01:00 (CET)
  - Summer (DST): UTC+02:00 (CEST)
- Postal codes: 89129
- Dialling codes: 07345
- Vehicle registration: UL
- Website: www.oellingen-albdonau.de

Öllingen (German pronunciation: [ˈœlɪŋən]) is a municipality in the district of Alb-Donau in Baden-Württemberg in Germany. Öllingen is on the southern slope of the Swabian Jura, in the northern Alb Danube county, about 18 km northeast of Ulm. Öllingen is located on 526m above sea level between the Lone Valley in the north and the Danube valley with the Langenau basin in the south.

Öllingen in Alb-Donau-Kreis

== General ==
Located on the southern slope of the Swabian Jura pool, Öllingen is a rural structured village which was dominated by agriculture, weaving and by the degradation of sand on the nearby Sandberg. During the last decades, the village has converted into a residential municipality with several farms and craft workshops. The most striking landmarks of the municipality are the highly visible Ulrich church and the water tower. The boundaries of the municipality cover an area of 809 hectares. With 531 inhabitants (31 December 2012) Öllingen belongs to the group of the 30 smallest independent municipalities in Baden-Württemberg.

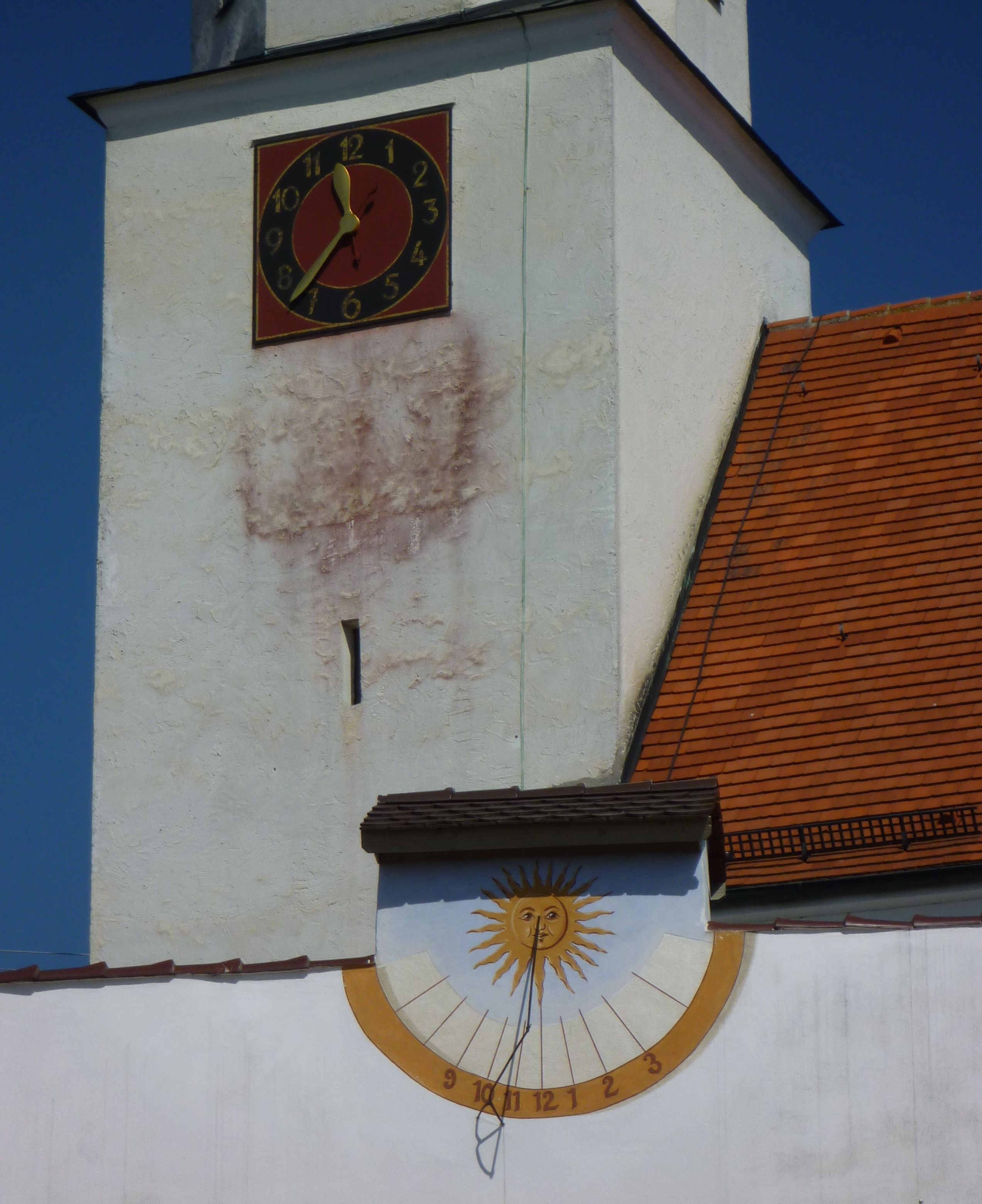
Öllingen - Church clock and sundial

== Crest ==
Öllinger Crest: On a red background is an upright silver (white) lion holding a silver (white) high cross in the front paws. The silver lion on a red background is derived from the coat of arms of the Counts of Dillingen. The cross bears the lion in its paws suggests the relationship to the monastery Anhausen. At the same time, it is considered an indication of historical relations to the Chorherrenstift Wiesensteig. Louis IV, Holy Roman Emperor had passed the patronage of Öllingen church in 1330 to the Chorherrenstift Wiesensteig. The coat of arms was awarded to the municipality by the state government on 21 February 1955, the flag by the District Office on October 1, 1984.

== Neighboring municipalities ==
The municipality is bordered to the north by the town Herbrechtingen district Bissingen in Heidenheim district, to the east to Rammingen, on the south to the town Langenau and in the west to Nerenstetten and Setzingen.

== History ==
Öllingen was documented in 1143 for the first time under the name Elingen, later Ellingen and belonged to the monastery Anhausen. By Excavations in 2002 it was demonstrated that there was a settlement in 2000 BC on the Sandberg. In addition, the Bockstein cave located in the Lone Valley was used by Stone Age hunters. In the 13th century Öllingen belonged to rule of Albeck and was bundled with Albeck 1383 at Ulm. The basic property of the municipality was sold since the 14th century to the imperial city, which meant that in 1790 the imperial city was almost the sole landowner. 1803 the land went over to Bavaria. Seven years later, in 1810 Öllingen then went to the Kingdom of Württemberg, which assigned Öllingen to the Oberamt Albeck. In 1934 the supreme office Ulm became county Ulm and later Ulm district (1938). The town remained a part of the district till the year 1973. The local government reform in 1973 led to the dissolution of the district Ulm and Öllingen came as a separate municipality to Alb-Donau-Kreis. Until 1786 the horse post of Oberelchingen took their way through Öllingen to Giengen and Nördlingen.

== Sons and daughters of the town ==
Georg Hiller (born 1946), local politician, mayor of Blaubeuren 1978–2002, honorary citizen of Blaubeuren.
