= Untermarchtal =

- Municipality
- Coat of arms

- Location of Untermarchtal within Alb-Donau-Kreis district
- Interactive map of Untermarchtal
- Location within Germany Location within Baden-Württemberg
- Coordinates: 48°14′22″N 9°36′37″E
- Country: Germany
- State: Baden-Württemberg
- Admin. region: Tübingen
- District: Alb-Donau-Kreis

Government
  - Mayor (2016–24): Bernhard Ritzler

Area
  - Total: 5.61 km^{2} (2.17 sq mi)
- Elevation: 506 m (1,660 ft)

Population (2025-12-31)
  - Total: 833
  - Density: 148/km^{2} (385/sq mi)
- Time zone: UTC+01:00 (CET)
  - Summer (DST): UTC+02:00 (CEST)
- Postal codes: 89617
- Dialling codes: 07393
- Vehicle registration: UL

Untermarchtal is a municipality in the district of Alb-Donau in Baden-Württemberg in Germany.

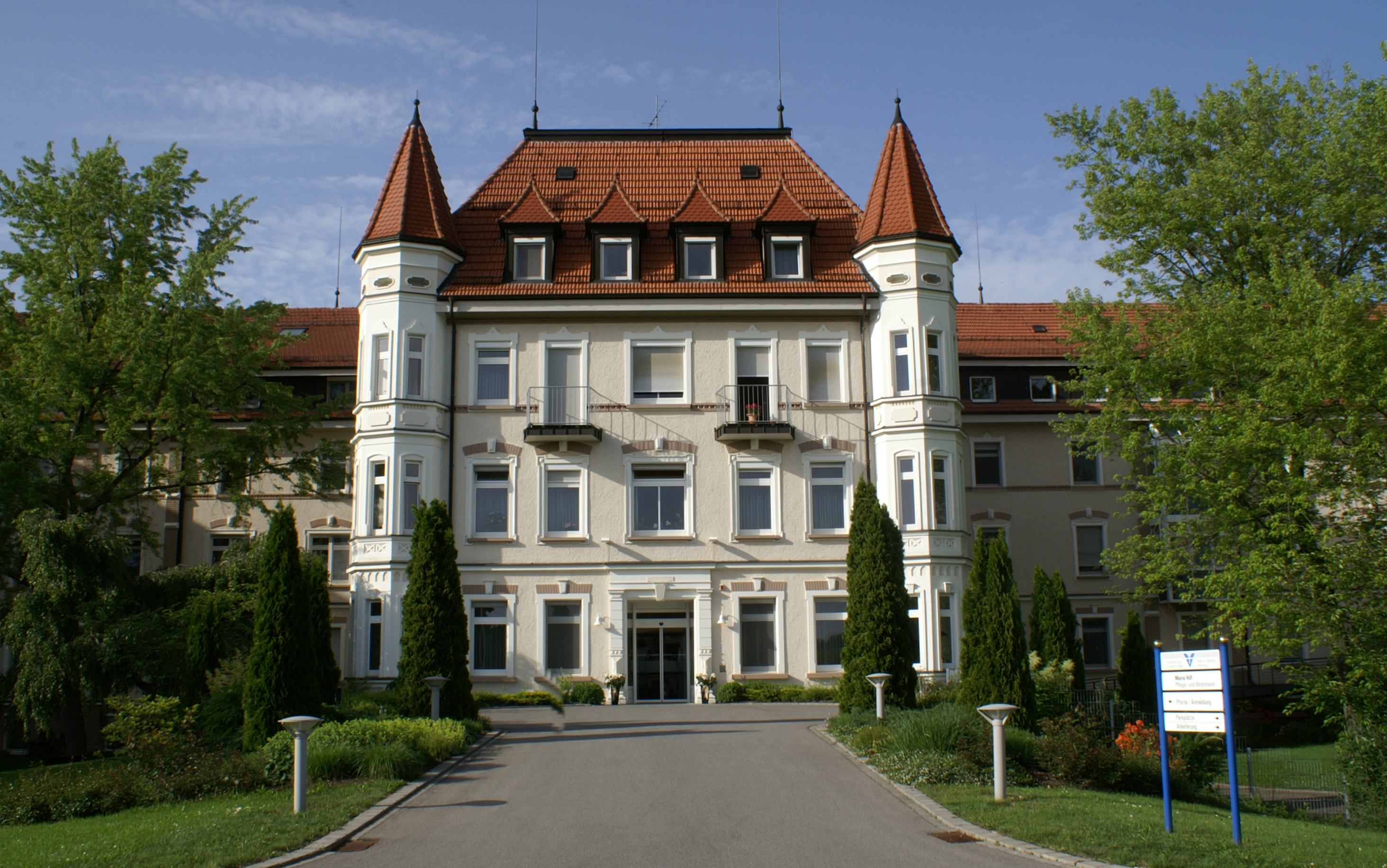
Untermarchtal Nursery home Maria Hilf
