= Alb-Donau-Kreis =

Coordinates: 48.4°N 9.85°E

Alb-Donau
- District
- Flag Coat of arms
- Country: Germany
- State: Baden-Württemberg
- Adm. region: Tübingen
- Capital: Ulm

Government
  - District admin.: Heiner Scheffold

Area
  - Total: 1,357.32 km^{2} (524.06 sq mi)

Population (31 December 2022)
  - Total: 202,476
  - Density: 150/km^{2} (390/sq mi)
- Time zone: UTC+01:00 (CET)
  - Summer (DST): UTC+02:00 (CEST)
- Website: alb-donau-kreis.de

Alb-Donau-Kreis is a Landkreis (district) in Baden-Württemberg, Germany. It is bounded by (from the south and clockwise) the districts of Biberach, Reutlingen, Göppingen and Heidenheim, the two Bavarian districts Günzburg and Neu-Ulm, and the city of Ulm.

== History ==
The history of the region is linked with the history of Ulm and the Swabian Jura.

Listing of towns and municipalities in the former Ulm district:

1. Albeck (now part of Langenau)
2. Altheim (Alb)
3. Altheim ob Weihung (now part of Staig)
4. Amstetten
5. Arnegg (now part of Blaustein)
6. Asch (now part of Blaubeuren)
7. Asselfingen
8. Ballendorf
9. Beimerstetten
10. Beiningen (now part of Blaubeuren)
11. Berghülen
12. Bermaringen (now part of Blaustein)
13. Bernstadt
14. Blaubeuren (town)
15. Blaustein
16. Bollingen (now part of Dornstadt)
17. Börslingen
18. Bräunisheim (now part of Amstetten)
19. Breitingen
20. Bühlenhausen (now part of Berghülen)
21. Dellmensingen (now part of Erbach)
22. Dietenheim (town)
23. Donaustetten (now part of Ulm)
24. Dorndorf (now part of Illerrieden)
25. Dornstadt
26. Eggingen (now part of Ulm)
27. Ehrenstein (now part of Blaustein)
28. Einsingen (now part of Ulm)
29. Erbach (town)
30. Ermingen (now part of Ulm)
31. Ettlenschieß (now part of Lonsee)
32. Gögglingen (now part of Ulm)
33. Göttingen (now part of Langenau)
34. Halzhausen (now part of Lonsee)
35. Herrlingen (now part of Blaustein)
36. Hofstett-Emerbuch (now part of Amstetten)
37. Holzkirch
38. Hörvelsingen (now part of Langenau)
39. Hüttisheim
40. Illerrieden
41. Jungingen (now part of Ulm)
42. Klingenstein (now part of Blaustein)
43. Langenau (town)
44. Lehr (now part of Ulm)
45. Lonsee
46. Luizhausen (now part of Lonsee)
47. Machtolsheim (now part of Laichingen)
48. Mähringen (now part of Ulm)
49. Markbronn (now part of Blaustein)
50. Merklingen
51. Neenstetten
52. Nellingen
53. Nerenstetten
54. Oberkirchberg (now part of Illerkirchberg)
55. Öllingen
56. Oppingen (now part of Nellingen)
57. Pappelau (now part of Blaubeuren)
58. Radelstetten (now part of Lonsee)
59. Rammingen
60. Regglisweiler (now part of Dietenheim)
61. Reutti (now part of Amstetten)
62. Schalkstetten (now part of Amstetten)
63. Scharenstetten (now part of Dornstadt)
64. Schnürpflingen
65. Seißen (now part of Blaubeuren)
66. Setzingen
67. Sonderbuch (now part of Blaubeuren)
68. Steinberg (now part of Staig)
69. Stubersheim (now part of Amstetten)
70. Suppingen (now part of Laichingen)
71. Temmenhausen (now part of Dornstadt)
72. Tomerdingen (now part of Dornstadt)
73. Türkheim (now part of Geislingen an der Steige in Göppingen)
74. Unterkirchberg (now part of Illerkirchberg)
75. Unterweiler (now part of Ulm)
76. Urspring (now part of Lonsee)
77. Waldhausen (now part of Geislingen an der Steige in Göppingen)
78. Wangen (now part of Illerrieden)
79. Weidenstetten
80. Weiler (now part of Blaubeuren)
81. Weinstetten (now part of Staig)
82. Westerstetten
83. Wippingen (now part of Blaustein)

The district of Alb-Donau was established in 1973 by merging the former districts of Ulm and Ehingen, some municipalities of the Münsingen district and the municipalities of Oberbalzheim and Unterbalzheim of the Biberach district.

== Geography ==
The city of Ulm is surrounded by the district. It is the administrative seat of the Alb-Donau district, although it is not part of the district.

The district is named after the Danube River and the Swabian Jura mountains. The Danube enters the district in the southwest, runs through the southern parts of the district and leaves eastwards to Ulm. North of the Danube banks, the hills of the Swabian Jura rise. The hill chain extends from southwest to northeast parallel to the course of the Danube River and is continued on either side of the district. An affluent of the Danube, the Iller River, forms the southeastern border of the Alb-Donau district, before it meets the Danube in Ulm.

== Coat of arms ==
The coat of arms is identical to the coat of arms of the former district of Ulm. The eagle was the heraldic animal of the Free Imperial City of Ulm. The shield displays the deer antlers of Württemberg and the red and white stripes of the Austrian county of Burgau (which the southern parts of the district once belonged to).

== Towns and municipalities ==
Clickable map of towns and municipalities in the district

Towns
1. Blaubeuren
2. Dietenheim
3. Ehingen
4. Erbach
5. Laichingen
6. Langenau
7. Munderkingen
8. Schelklingen
Municipalities
1. Allmendingen
2. Altheim
3. Altheim (Alb)
4. Amstetten
5. Asselfingen
6. Ballendorf
7. Balzheim
8. Beimerstetten
9. Berghülen
10. Bernstadt
11. Blaustein
12. Börslingen
13. Breitingen
14. Dornstadt
15. Emeringen
16. Emerkingen
17. Griesingen
18. Grundsheim
19. Hausen am Bussen
20. Heroldstatt
21. Holzkirch
22. Hüttisheim
23. Illerkirchberg
24. Illerrieden
25. Lauterach
26. Lonsee
27. Merklingen
28. Neenstetten
29. Nellingen
30. Nerenstetten
31. Oberdischingen
32. Obermarchtal
33. Oberstadion
34. Öllingen
35. Öpfingen
36. Rammingen
37. Rechtenstein
38. Rottenacker
39. Schnürpflingen
40. Setzingen
41. Staig
42. Untermarchtal
43. Unterstadion
44. Unterwachingen
45. Weidenstetten
46. Westerheim
47. Westerstetten
