= Obermarchtal =

- Municipality
- Coat of arms

- Location of Obermarchtal within Alb-Donau-Kreis district
- Interactive map of Obermarchtal
- Location within Germany Location within Baden-Württemberg
- Coordinates: 48°14′2″N 9°34′12″E
- Country: Germany
- State: Baden-Württemberg
- Admin. region: Tübingen
- District: Alb-Donau-Kreis

Government
  - Mayor (2018–26): Martin Krämer

Area
  - Total: 26.59 km^{2} (10.27 sq mi)
- Elevation: 539 m (1,768 ft)

Population (2025-12-31)
  - Total: 1,289
  - Density: 48.48/km^{2} (125.6/sq mi)
- Time zone: UTC+01:00 (CET)
  - Summer (DST): UTC+02:00 (CEST)
- Postal codes: 89611
- Dialling codes: 07375
- Vehicle registration: UL
- Website: www.obermarchtal.de

Obermarchtal is a town in the district of Alb-Donau in Baden-Württemberg in Germany.

== Demographics ==
Population development:

Year	Inhabitants
1990	1,230
2001	1,291
2011	1,242
2021	1,311
