= Grundsheim =

- Municipality
- Coat of arms

- Location of Grundsheim within Alb-Donau-Kreis district
- Interactive map of Grundsheim
- Location within Germany Location within Baden-Württemberg
- Coordinates: 48°10′31″N 9°40′1″E
- Country: Germany
- State: Baden-Württemberg
- Admin. region: Tübingen
- District: Alb-Donau-Kreis

Government
  - Mayor (2021–29): Uwe Handgrätinger

Area
  - Total: 3.70 km^{2} (1.43 sq mi)
- Elevation: 532 m (1,745 ft)

Population (2025-12-31)
  - Total: 202
  - Density: 54.6/km^{2} (141/sq mi)
- Time zone: UTC+01:00 (CET)
  - Summer (DST): UTC+02:00 (CEST)
- Postal codes: 89613
- Dialling codes: 07357
- Vehicle registration: UL
- Website: www.grundsheim.de

Grundsheim is a municipality in the district of Alb-Donau in Baden-Württemberg in Germany.
