= Emeringen =

- Municipality
- Coat of arms

- Location of Emeringen within Alb-Donau-Kreis district
- Interactive map of Emeringen
- Location within Germany Location within Baden-Württemberg
- Coordinates: 48°12′2.04″N 9°31′3.72″E
- Country: Germany
- State: Baden-Württemberg
- Admin. region: Tübingen
- District: Alb-Donau-Kreis

Government
  - Mayor (2018–26): Josef Renner

Area
  - Total: 7.54 km^{2} (2.91 sq mi)
- Elevation: 579 m (1,900 ft)

Population (2025-12-31)
  - Total: 180
  - Density: 24/km^{2} (62/sq mi)
- Time zone: UTC+01:00 (CET)
  - Summer (DST): UTC+02:00 (CEST)
- Postal codes: 88499
- Dialling codes: 07373
- Vehicle registration: UL
- Website: www.emeringen.eu

Emeringen (German pronunciation: [ˈeːməʁɪŋən]) is a town in the Alb-Donau district, in Baden-Württemberg, Germany.
