= Allmendingen, Baden-Württemberg =

Allmendingen
- Municipality
- Coat of arms

- Location of Allmendingen within Alb-Donau-Kreis district
- Interactive map of Allmendingen
- Location within Germany Location within Baden-Württemberg
- Coordinates: 48°19′41″N 9°43′14″E
- Country: Germany
- State: Baden-Württemberg
- Admin. region: Tübingen
- District: Alb-Donau-Kreis
- Subdivisions: 5

Government
  - Mayor (2018–26): Florian Teichmann

Area
  - Total: 45.90 km^{2} (17.72 sq mi)
- Elevation: 518 m (1,699 ft)

Population (2025-12-31)
  - Total: 4,899
  - Density: 106.7/km^{2} (276.4/sq mi)
- Time zone: UTC+01:00 (CET)
  - Summer (DST): UTC+02:00 (CEST)
- Postal codes: 89604
- Dialling codes: 07391, 07384
- Vehicle registration: UL
- Website: www.allmendingen.de

Allmendingen (German pronunciation: [alˈmɛndɪŋən]) is a municipality in the Alb-Donau district, in Baden-Württemberg, Germany.

== Geography ==
Allmendingen is located on the Schmiech in an originally from the Danube eroded valley that separates the easter Hochsträß from the rest of the Swabian Jura. The highest point on the Lutheran mountains (Ennahofen) is 750 meters above sea level. NN.

== Neighboring communities ==
The municipality is bordered to the north to Schelklingen, in the east to Altheim, in the south and west to Ehingen (Donau).

== Municipality arrangement ==
The municipality Allmendingen consists of the locations Allmendingen (3304 inhabitants on 30 April 2009), Ennahofen (266 inhabitants), Grötzingen (296 inhabitants), Niederhofen (375 inhabitants) and Weilersteußlingen (249 inhabitants).

== History ==
Earliest evidence of human habitation is the discovery of a brick kiln dating back to the Roman occupation in the district Niederhofen.

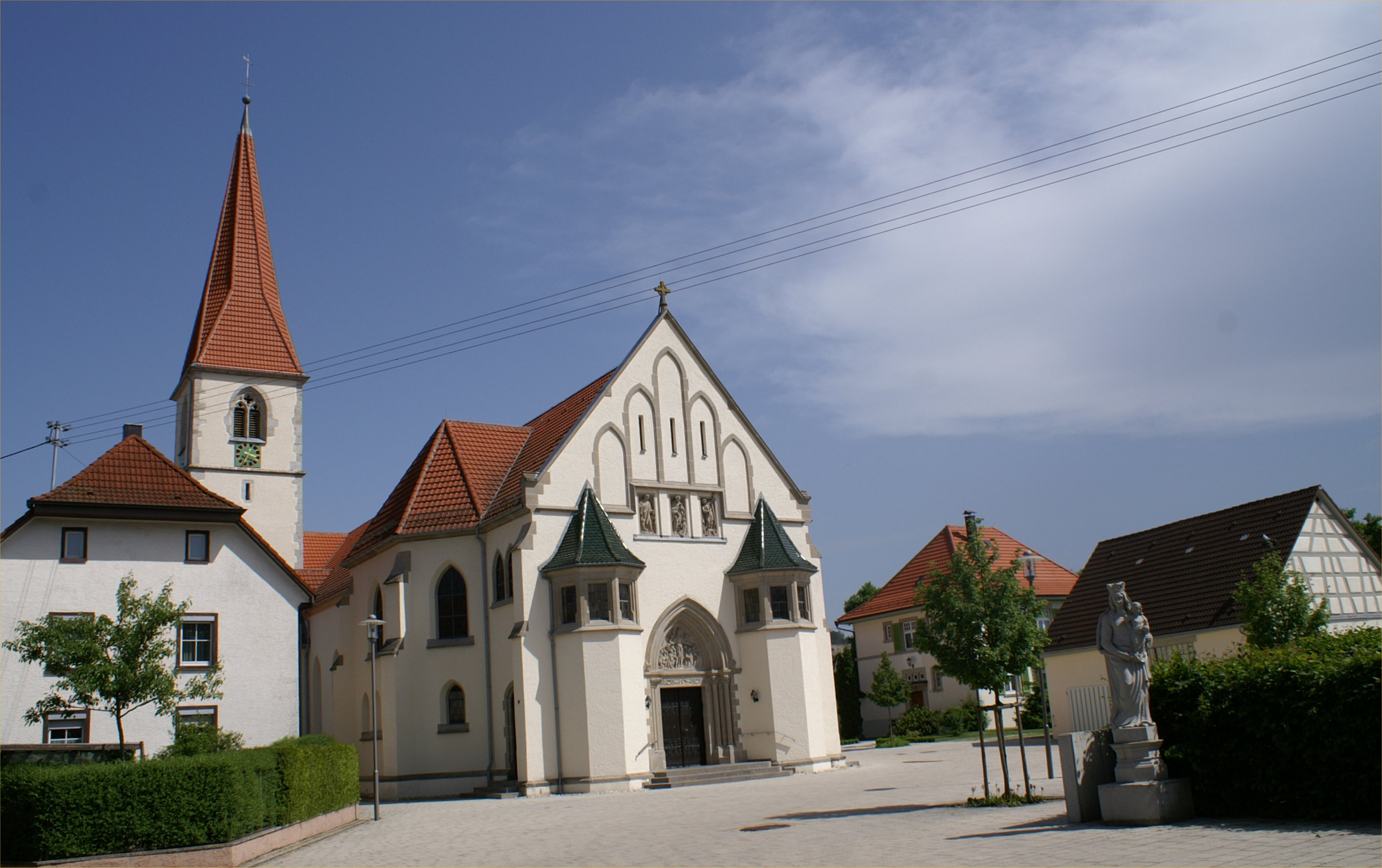
Allmendingen Kirche Maria Himmelfahrt

== Population Development ==
There are numbers of inhabitants after the respective area of jurisdiction. The figures are census results (¹) or official updates of the Statistical Office of Baden-Württemberg.

YearJahr	Residents
1. December 1871 ¹	2.031
1. December 1880 ¹	2.176
1. December 1890 ¹	2.539
1. December 1900 ¹	2.841
1. December 1910 ¹	2.856
16. June 1925 ¹	2.793
16. June 1933 ¹	2.751
17. May 1939 ¹	2.721
13. September 1950 ¹	3.144

Year	Residents
6. June 1961 ¹	3.408
27. May 1970 ¹	3.958
31. December 1980	4.082
27. May 1987 ¹	4.097
31. December 1990	4.324
31. December 1995	4.526
31. December 2000	4.509
31. December 2005	4.601
31. December 2010	4.441

== Politics ==
The council Allmendingen has after the last elections 20 members. The local elections on 25 May 2014 led to the following official results. The turnout was 58.5%. The council consists of the elected honorary councilors and the mayor as chairman. The mayor is entitled to vote in the municipal council.

- Party and seats:
  - CDU – 49.7% = 10 seats
  - Free voters – 50.3% = 10 seats

== Crest ==
Blazon : In silver under a blue shield head, within three gold balls (loaves), a black, upright horse with a red tongue. The coat of arms combines elements of the coat of arms of the lords of Freyberg (balls), whose history is closely linked to the Allmendingen, and the bourgeois family Renner (horse), which also had possessions in Allmendingen.

== Economics ==
=== Transportation ===
Allmendingen is located on the Ulm–Sigmaringen railway and is a regional train stop. There are hourly rail connections to Ehingen (Donau) and Ulm. Allmendingen is incorporated in the Donau-Iller-Nahverkehrsverbund. The community is located at the national road B 492 Ehingen-Blaubeuren.

=== Established businesses ===
The largest employer is the automotive Burgmaier. Other industrial companies are the form manufacturers Rampf, as well as the cement plant Schwenk.

== Leisure and sports facilities ==
Allmendingen has an outdoor pool. There is also a tennis court, a gymnastics and sports hall and the football stadium of the TSV Allmendingen.

== Community development ==
=== Incorporations ===
On 1 January 1974, the previously independent municipalities Ennahofen, Grötzingen, Niederhofen and Weilersteußlingen were incorporated.

=== Renovation of the center ===
The municipality Allmendingen leads since 2000 through a restructuring of their village. Within the rehabilitation section I the old school house, built in 1885, was transformed into a community center. The following public construction phases were realized:

- Northern main road (2001/2002)
- Church Square (2003)
- Southern Main Road (2004)
- Design of the town square (2006)

== Points of interest ==
=== Buildings ===
- Parish Church of St. Mary of the Assumption of the 15th century
- Castle of the Barons von Freyberg, 16th century. Since hundreds of years, the barons of Freyberg-Eisenberg are resident in Allmendingen.
- Old castle
- New castle

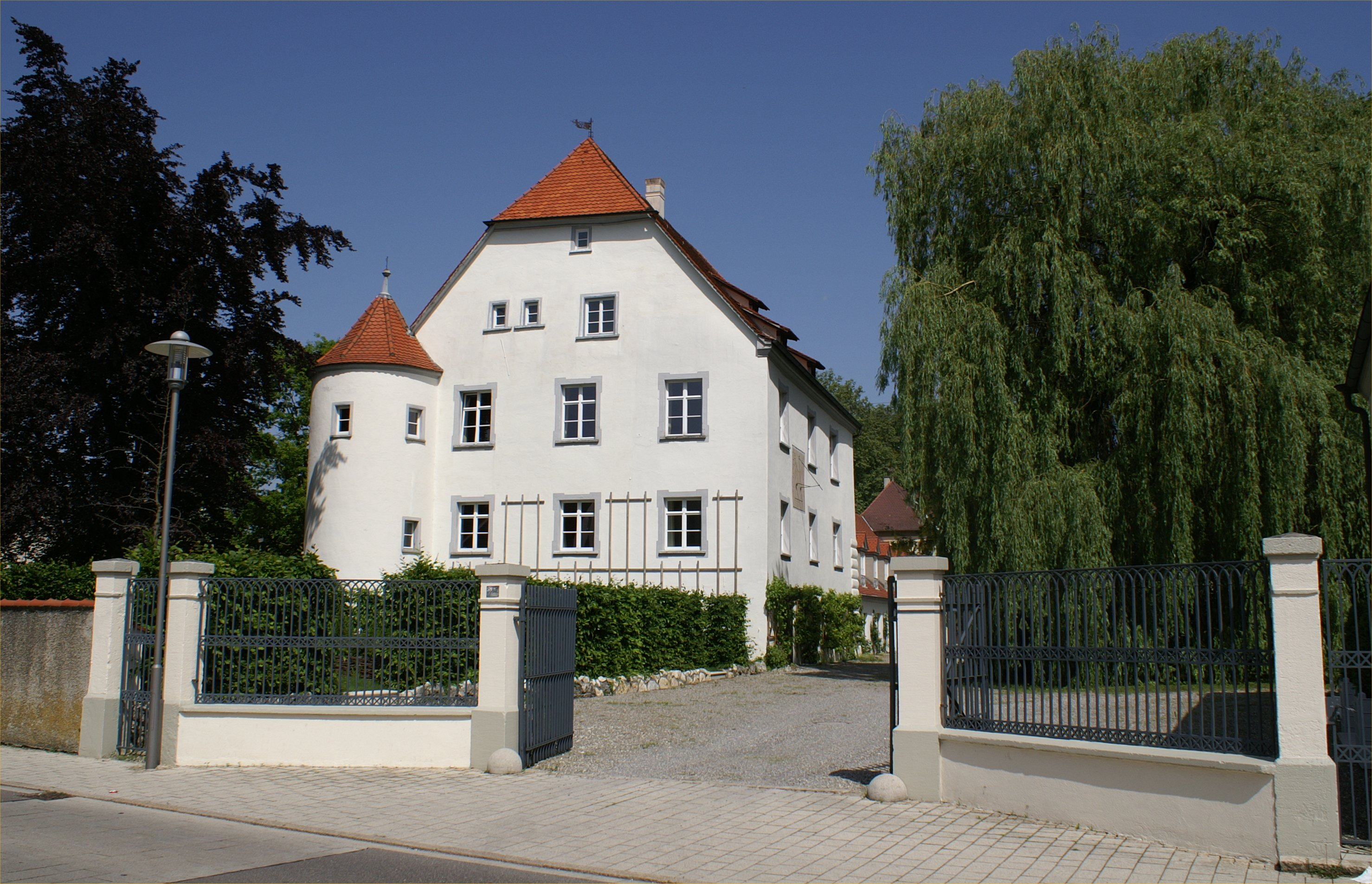
Allmendingen Altes Schloss (Old castle)

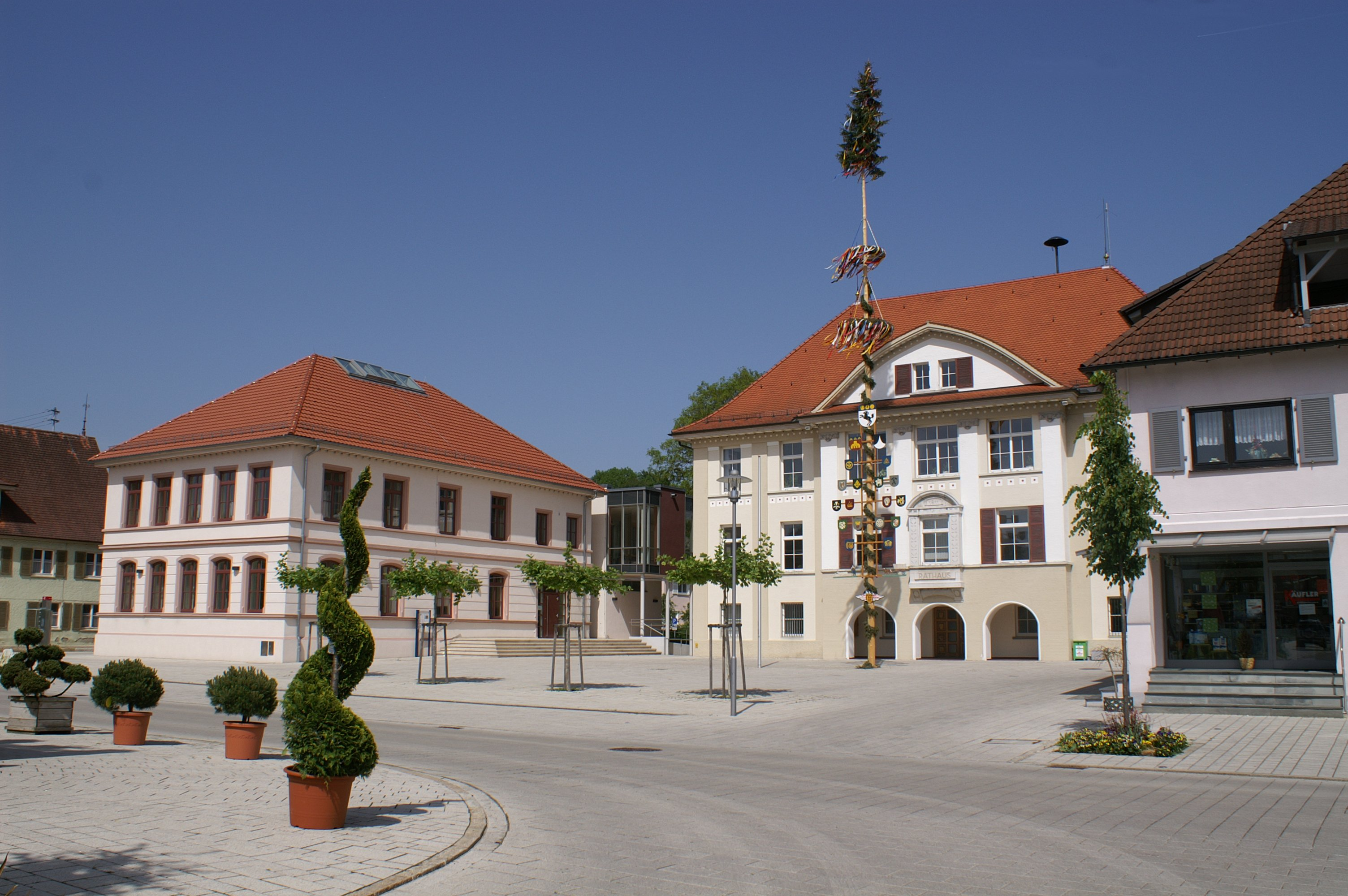
Allmendingen City hall

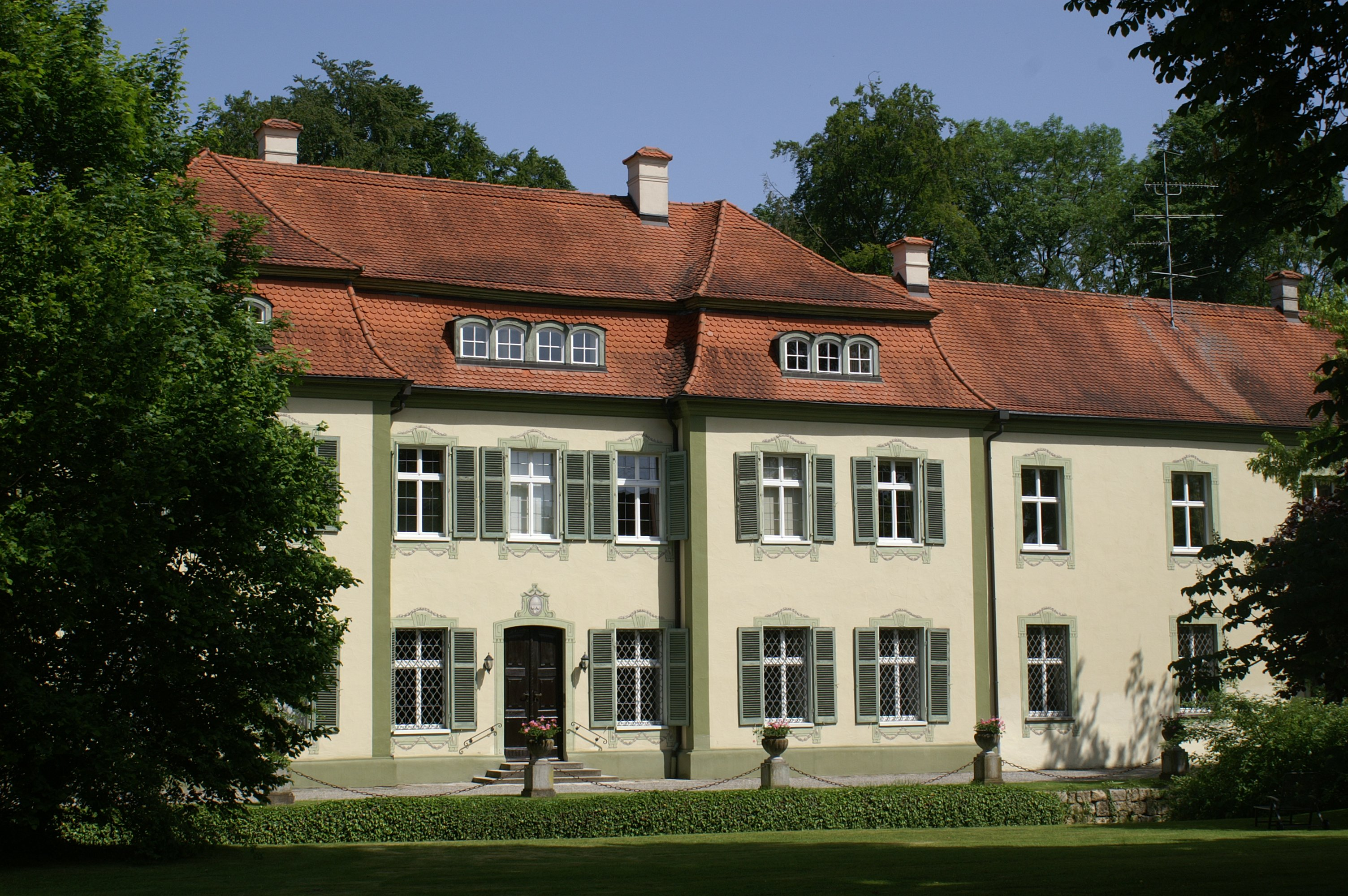
Allmendingen Schloss (New castle)

== Notable people ==
- Joseph von Sontheimer (1787–1846), Royal Württembergian master doctor, translator of Arabian medicinals recipe of Avicenna
- Albrecht von Freyberg (1876–1943), marine officer, vice-admiral of the Reichsmarine
- Helmut Braig (1923–2013), painter, sculptor, author
- Ernst Geprägs (1929–2011), born in Grötzingen, farmer, vice-president of German farmer association
