= Griesingen =

- Municipality
- Coat of arms

- Location of Griesingen within Alb-Donau-Kreis district
- Interactive map of Griesingen
- Location within Germany Location within Baden-Württemberg
- Coordinates: 48°16′0″N 9°46′57″E
- Country: Germany
- State: Baden-Württemberg
- Admin. region: Tübingen
- District: Alb-Donau-Kreis

Government
  - Mayor (2022–30): Oliver Klumpp

Area
  - Total: 8.16 km^{2} (3.15 sq mi)
- Elevation: 506 m (1,660 ft)

Population (2025-12-31)
  - Total: 1,043
  - Density: 128/km^{2} (331/sq mi)
- Time zone: UTC+01:00 (CET)
  - Summer (DST): UTC+02:00 (CEST)
- Postal codes: 89608
- Dialling codes: 07391
- Vehicle registration: UL
- Website: www.griesingen.de

Greisingen is a municipality in the district of Alb-Donau in Baden-Württemberg in Germany.
