= Altheim (Ehingen) =

German municipality

Altheim bei Ehingen
- Municipality
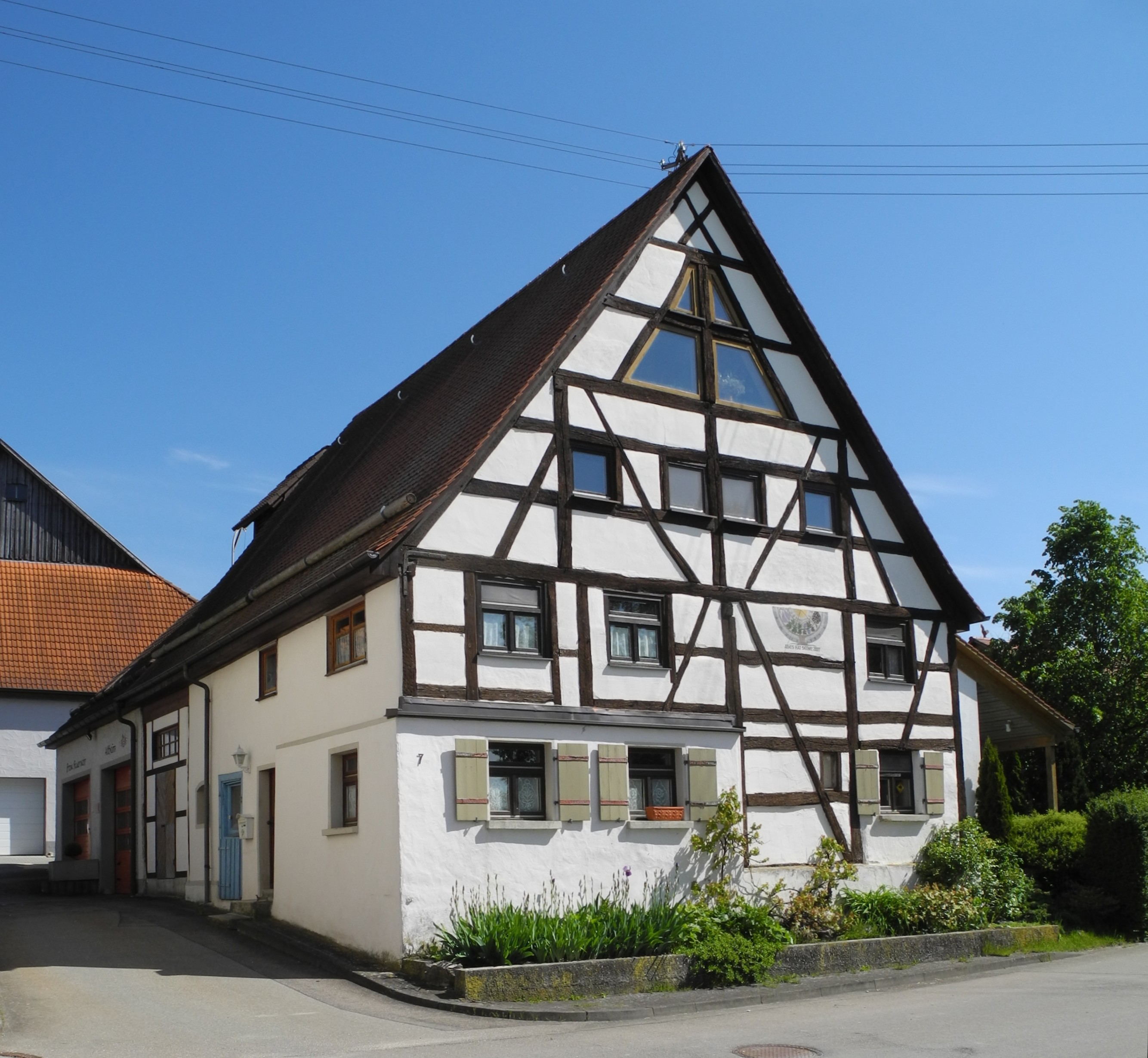
- Half-timber house in Altheim

- Coat of arms

- Location of Altheim bei Ehingen within Alb-Donau-Kreis district
- Interactive map of Altheim bei Ehingen
- Location within Germany Location within Baden-Württemberg
- Coordinates: 48°19′43″N 9°46′16″E
- Country: Germany
- State: Baden-Württemberg
- Admin. region: Tübingen
- District: Alb-Donau-Kreis

Area
  - Total: 7.8 km^{2} (3.0 sq mi)
- Elevation: 606 m (1,988 ft)

Population (2025-12-31)
  - Total: 572
  - Density: 73/km^{2} (190/sq mi)
- Time zone: UTC+01:00 (CET)
  - Summer (DST): UTC+02:00 (CEST)
- Postal codes: 89605
- Dialling codes: 07391
- Vehicle registration: UL

Altheim (German pronunciation: [ˈalthaɪm]) is a municipality in the district of Alb-Donau in Baden-Württemberg, Germany.

== History ==
In the 13th century, Altheim was a possession of the Lordship of Steußlingen. The township was mediatized to the Kingdom of Württemberg in 1805 and it was assigned to Oberamt Urspring. Altheim was reassigned to Oberamt Ehingen in 1810 and remained in that district when it was reorganized in 1938 into Landkreis Ehingen. After World War II, Altheim, still a haufendorf with two separate town centers, began an urban spread to the west. As part of the 1973 Baden-Württemberg district reform, Ehingen's district was dissolved and Altheim was assigned to the new Alb-Donau district.

== Geography ==
Altheim is a municipality (Gemeinde) of the Alb-Donau district of Baden-Württemberg, one of the 16 states of the Federal Republic of Germany. It is physically located in the Hochsträß region, so named for a historic road that runs through the municipality from west to east. Elevation above sea level in the municipal area ranges from a high of 640 meters (2,100 ft) Normalnull (NN) to a low of 550 meters (1,800 ft) NN where the Siegentalgraben flows into the Schmiechener See.

== Coat of arms ==
Altheim's coat of arms displays three plates upon a field of blue. At the top of the blazon is a white chief and upon that a blue, engrailed and invected line. This coat of arms was first adopted by the municipal council of Altheim on 3 March 1937 with permission from its owner, Baron Conrad von Freyberg, head of a local noble house that had lived in the area since 1528. A request to for approval of official use of this coat of arms was sent to the Reichsstatthalter of Württemberg, though approval did not materialize. A modified version was used through World War II, with the field behind the roundels was turned black and a yellow chief containing a black stag antler. On 24 August 1957, the Federal Ministry of the Interior approved the Freyberg coat of arms, but changed the chief to its current state as a reference to Altheim's 13th century owners, the Lords of Steußlingen. A municipal flag was issued alongside the official coat of arms.
