= Asselfingen =

- Municipality
- Coat of arms

- Location of Asselfingen within Alb-Donau-Kreis district
- Interactive map of Asselfingen
- Location within Germany Location within Baden-Württemberg
- Coordinates: 48°31′46″N 10°11′34″E
- Country: Germany
- State: Baden-Württemberg
- Admin. region: Tübingen
- District: Alb-Donau-Kreis

Government
  - Mayor (2017–25): Armin Bollinger

Area
  - Total: 12.85 km^{2} (4.96 sq mi)
- Elevation: 504 m (1,654 ft)

Population (2025-12-31)
  - Total: 1,042
  - Density: 81.09/km^{2} (210.0/sq mi)
- Time zone: UTC+01:00 (CET)
  - Summer (DST): UTC+02:00 (CEST)
- Postal codes: 89176
- Dialling codes: 07345
- Vehicle registration: UL
- Website: www.asselfingen.de

Asselfingen (German pronunciation: [ˈasl̩ˌfiɪŋən]) is a municipality in the district of Alb-Donau in Baden-Württemberg in Germany.

== Mayors ==
- 1986–2002: Georg Unseld
- 2002–present: Armin Bollinger

Armin Bollinger was reelected in November 2009 and in December 2017.

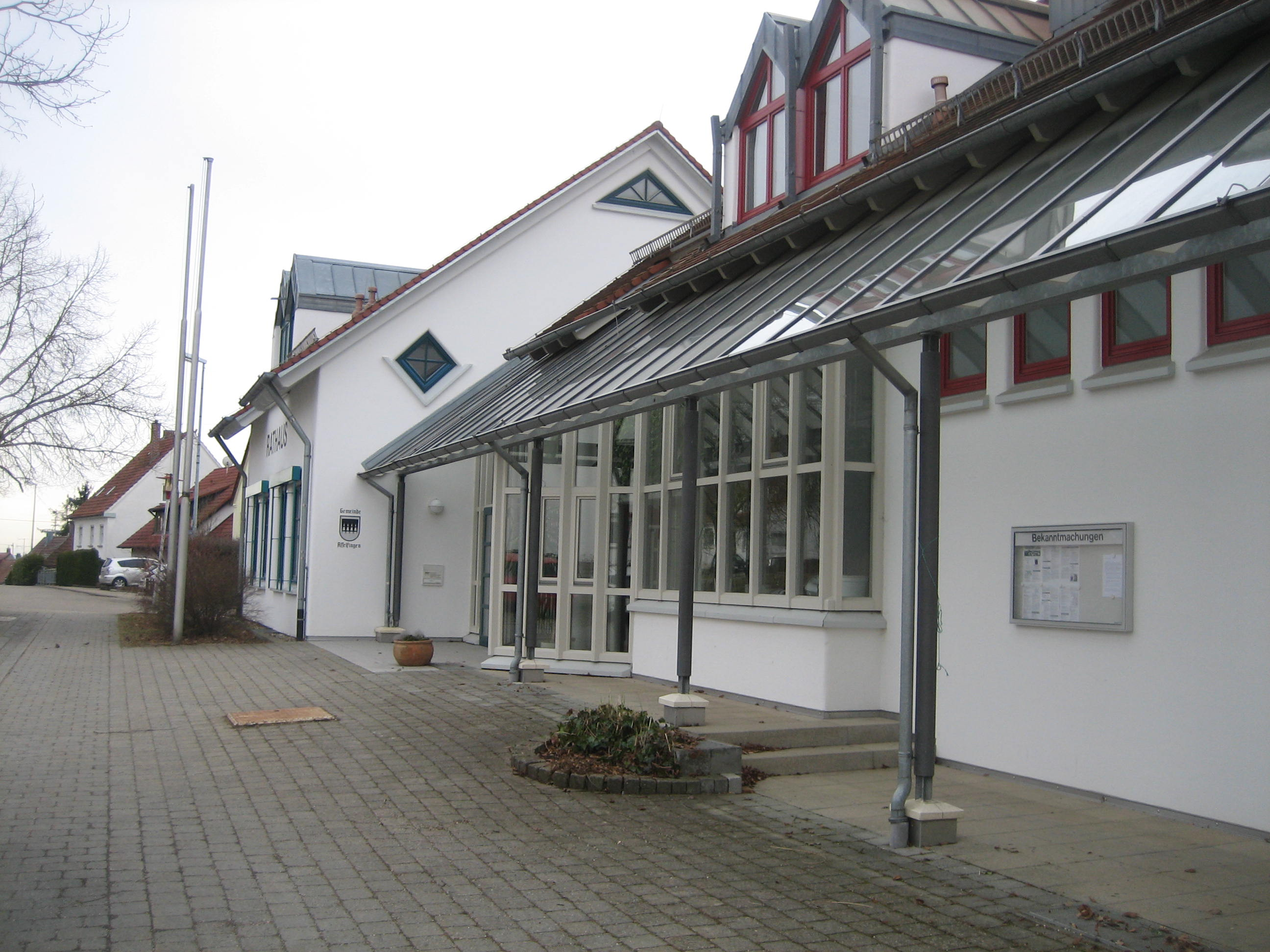
Asselfingen Town hall
