= Börslingen =

- Municipality
- Coat of arms

- Location of Börslingen within Alb-Donau-Kreis district
- Interactive map of Börslingen
- Location within Germany Location within Baden-Württemberg
- Coordinates: 48°32′22″N 10°3′45″E
- Country: Germany
- State: Baden-Württemberg
- Admin. region: Tübingen
- District: Alb-Donau-Kreis

Government
  - Mayor (2018–26): Heinrich Wolf

Area
  - Total: 6.29 km^{2} (2.43 sq mi)
- Elevation: 560 m (1,840 ft)

Population (2025-12-31)
  - Total: 169
  - Density: 26.9/km^{2} (69.6/sq mi)
- Time zone: UTC+01:00 (CET)
  - Summer (DST): UTC+02:00 (CEST)
- Postal codes: 89177
- Dialling codes: 07340
- Vehicle registration: UL

Börslingen (German pronunciation: [ˈbœʁslɪŋən]) is a municipality in the district of Alb-Donau in Baden-Württemberg in Germany.
