= Dornstadt =

- Municipality
- Coat of arms

- Location of Dornstadt within Alb-Donau-Kreis district
- Interactive map of Dornstadt
- Location within Germany Location within Baden-Württemberg
- Coordinates: 48°28′9″N 9°56′30″E
- Country: Germany
- State: Baden-Württemberg
- Admin. region: Tübingen
- District: Alb-Donau-Kreis

Government
  - Mayor (2023–31): Rainer Braig

Area
  - Total: 59.24 km^{2} (22.87 sq mi)
- Elevation: 600 m (2,000 ft)

Population (2025-12-31)
  - Total: 9,233
  - Density: 155.9/km^{2} (403.7/sq mi)
- Time zone: UTC+01:00 (CET)
  - Summer (DST): UTC+02:00 (CEST)
- Postal codes: 89156–89160
- Dialling codes: 07348, 07336
- Vehicle registration: UL
- Website: www.dornstadt.de

Dornstadt (German pronunciation: [ˈdɔɐ̯nʃtat]) is a municipality in the district of Alb-Donau in Baden-Württemberg in Germany.
