= Unterwachingen =

- Municipality
- Coat of arms

- Location of Unterwachingen within Alb-Donau-Kreis district
- Interactive map of Unterwachingen
- Location within Germany Location within Baden-Württemberg
- Coordinates: 48°12′11″N 9°38′37″E
- Country: Germany
- State: Baden-Württemberg
- Admin. region: Tübingen
- District: Alb-Donau-Kreis

Government
  - Mayor (2017–25): Hans Rieger

Area
  - Total: 2.60 km^{2} (1.00 sq mi)
- Elevation: 520 m (1,710 ft)

Population (2025-12-31)
  - Total: 192
  - Density: 73.8/km^{2} (191/sq mi)
- Time zone: UTC+01:00 (CET)
  - Summer (DST): UTC+02:00 (CEST)
- Postal codes: 89597
- Dialling codes: 07393
- Vehicle registration: UL

Unterwachingen is a village in the district of Alb-Donau in Baden-Württemberg in Germany with its own administration competence.
