= Beimerstetten =

- Municipality
- Coat of arms

- Location of Beimerstetten within Alb-Donau-Kreis district
- Interactive map of Beimerstetten
- Location within Germany Location within Baden-Württemberg
- Coordinates: 48°29′3″N 9°58′52″E
- Country: Germany
- State: Baden-Württemberg
- Admin. region: Tübingen
- District: Alb-Donau-Kreis

Government
  - Mayor (2023–31): Andreas Haas

Area
  - Total: 14.34 km^{2} (5.54 sq mi)
- Elevation: 587 m (1,926 ft)

Population (2025-12-31)
  - Total: 2,409
  - Density: 168.0/km^{2} (435.1/sq mi)
- Time zone: UTC+01:00 (CET)
  - Summer (DST): UTC+02:00 (CEST)
- Postal codes: 89179
- Dialling codes: 07348
- Vehicle registration: UL
- Website: www.beimerstetten.de

Beimerstetten (German pronunciation: [ˌbaɪmɐˈʃtɛtn̩]) is a municipality in the district of Alb-Donau in Baden-Württemberg in Germany.
