= Unterstadion =

- Municipality
- Coat of arms

- Location of Unterstadion within Alb-Donau-Kreis district
- Interactive map of Unterstadion
- Location within Germany Location within Baden-Württemberg
- Coordinates: 48°12′12″N 9°41′22″E
- Country: Germany
- State: Baden-Württemberg
- Admin. region: Tübingen
- District: Alb-Donau-Kreis

Government
  - Mayor (2019–27): Uwe Handgrätinger

Area
  - Total: 8.84 km^{2} (3.41 sq mi)
- Elevation: 508 m (1,667 ft)

Population (2025-12-31)
  - Total: 862
  - Density: 97.5/km^{2} (253/sq mi)
- Time zone: UTC+01:00 (CET)
  - Summer (DST): UTC+02:00 (CEST)
- Postal codes: 89619
- Dialling codes: 07393
- Vehicle registration: UL
- Website: www.unterstadion.de

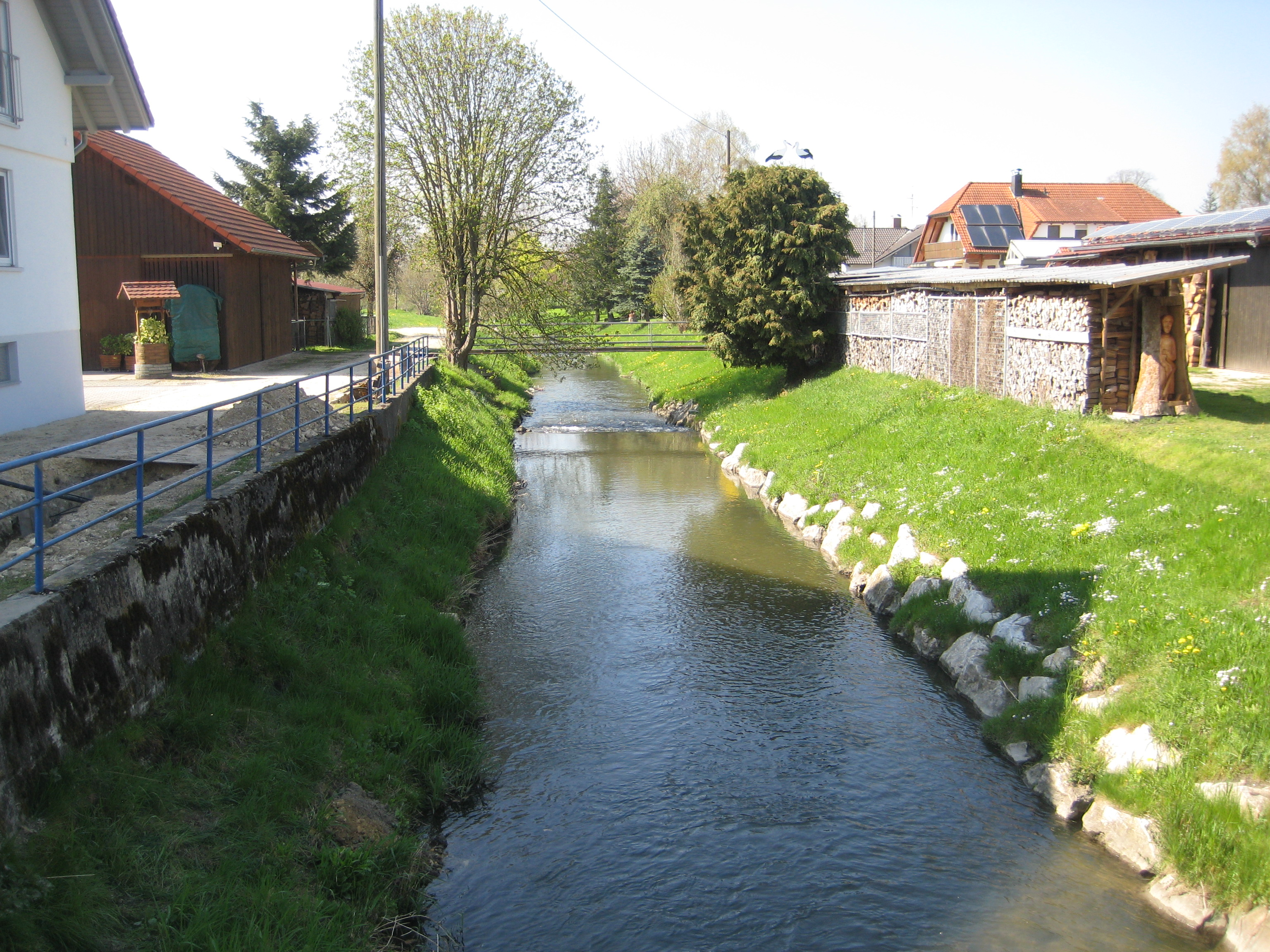
Stehenbach River in Unterstadion

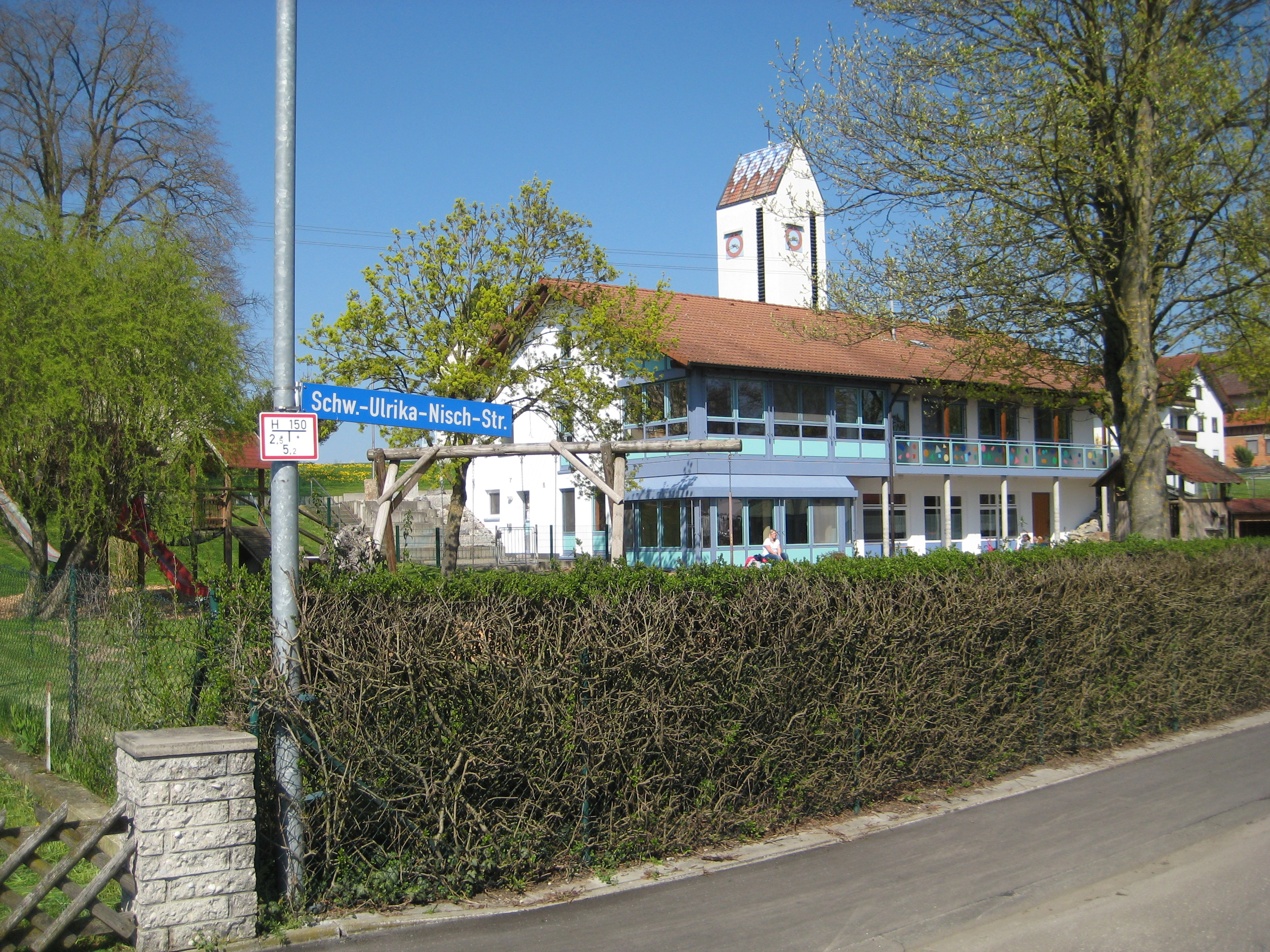
Schwester-Ulrike-Nisch-Strasse, Unterstadion

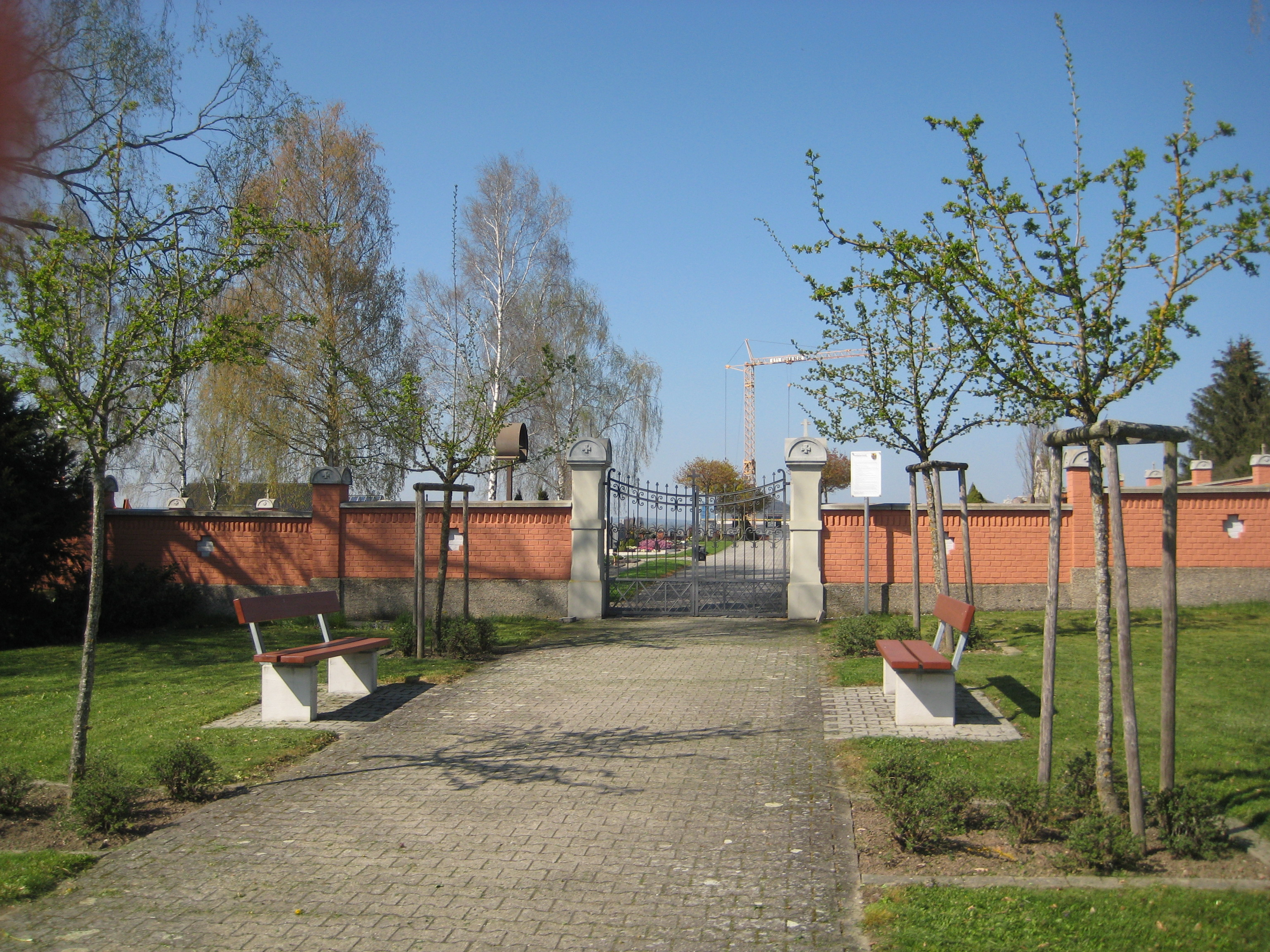
Entrance to Friedhof, Unterstadion

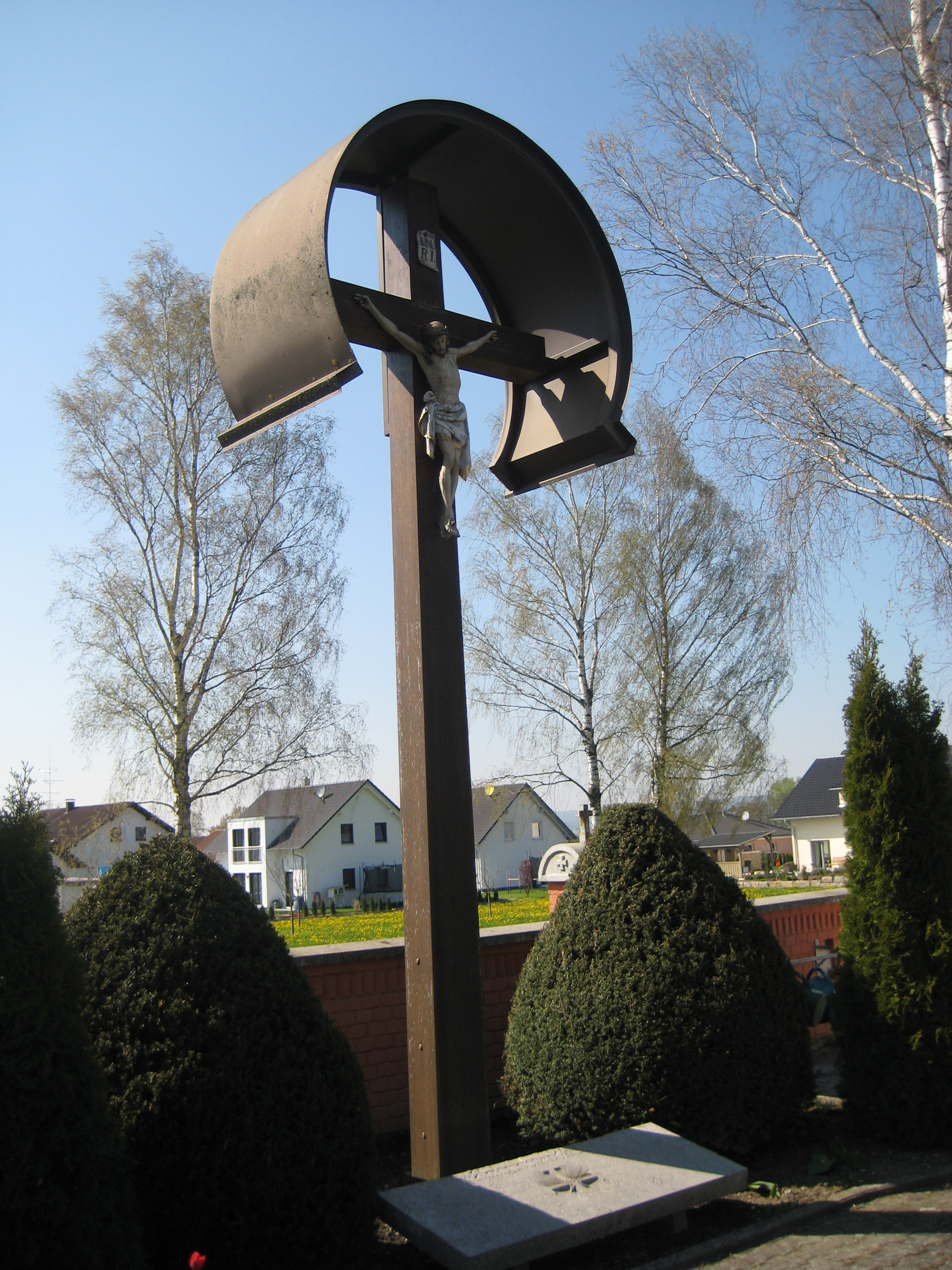
Crucifix in Unterstadion Friedhof

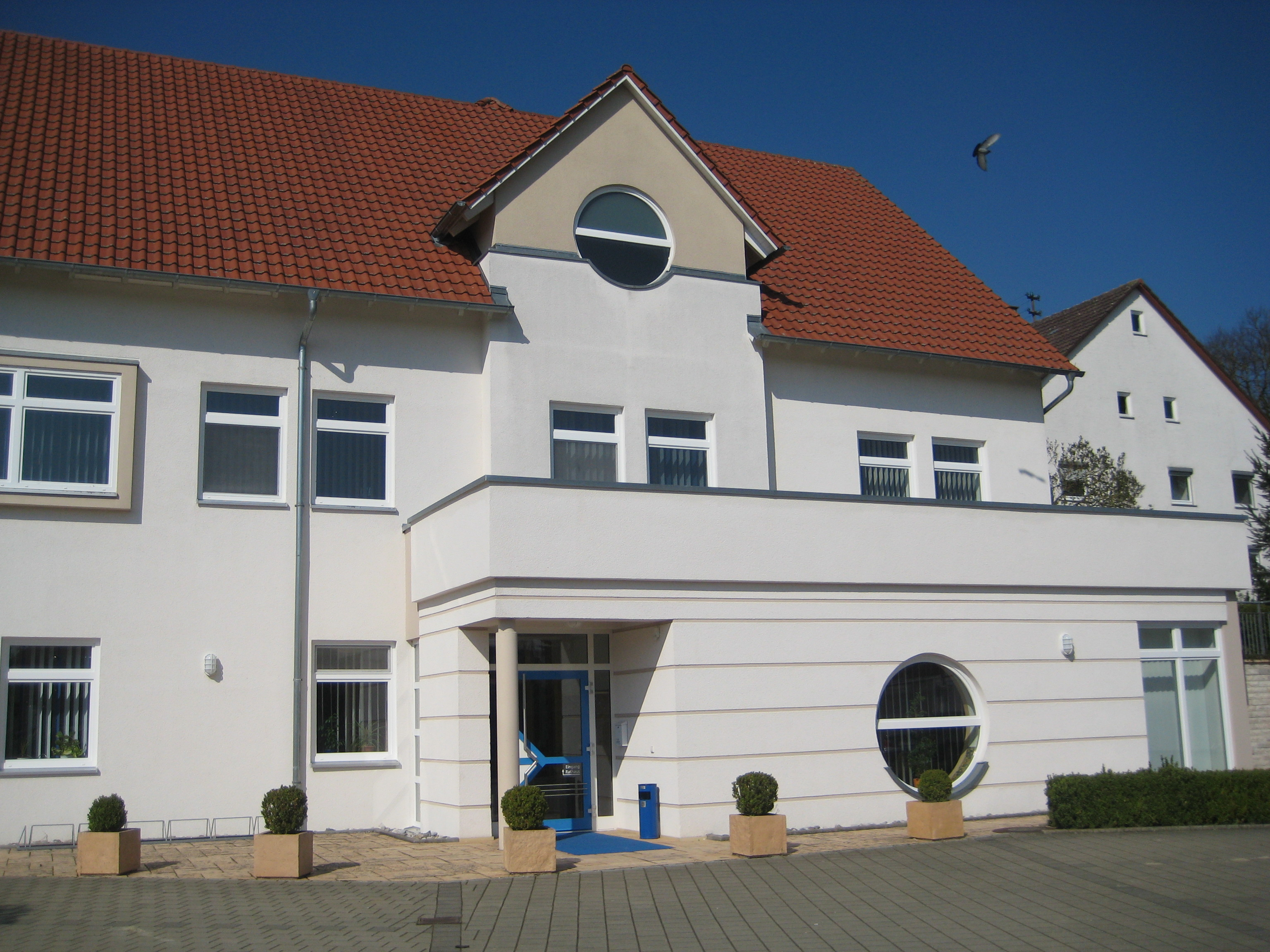
Gemeinde (Community Center) Unterstadion

Unterstadion is a municipality in the district of Alb-Donau in Baden-Württemberg in Germany. It is located about 74 kilometres (46 mi) south of the state capital of Stuttgart
