= Öpfingen =

- Municipality
- Coat of arms

- Location of Öpfingen within Alb-Donau-Kreis district
- Interactive map of Öpfingen
- Location within Germany Location within Baden-Württemberg
- Coordinates: 48°17′13″N 9°48′11″E
- Country: Germany
- State: Baden-Württemberg
- Admin. region: Tübingen
- District: Alb-Donau-Kreis

Government
  - Mayor (2023–31): Andreas Braun (CDU)

Area
  - Total: 8.88 km^{2} (3.43 sq mi)
- Elevation: 504 m (1,654 ft)

Population (2025-12-31)
  - Total: 2,291
  - Density: 258/km^{2} (668/sq mi)
- Time zone: UTC+01:00 (CET)
  - Summer (DST): UTC+02:00 (CEST)
- Postal codes: 89614
- Dialling codes: 07391
- Vehicle registration: UL
- Website: www.oepfingen.de

Öpfingen is a municipality in the district of Alb-Donau in Baden-Württemberg in Germany.

== Local council ==
Since the election in May 2014 the council has 10 members.
