= Lonsee =

- Municipality
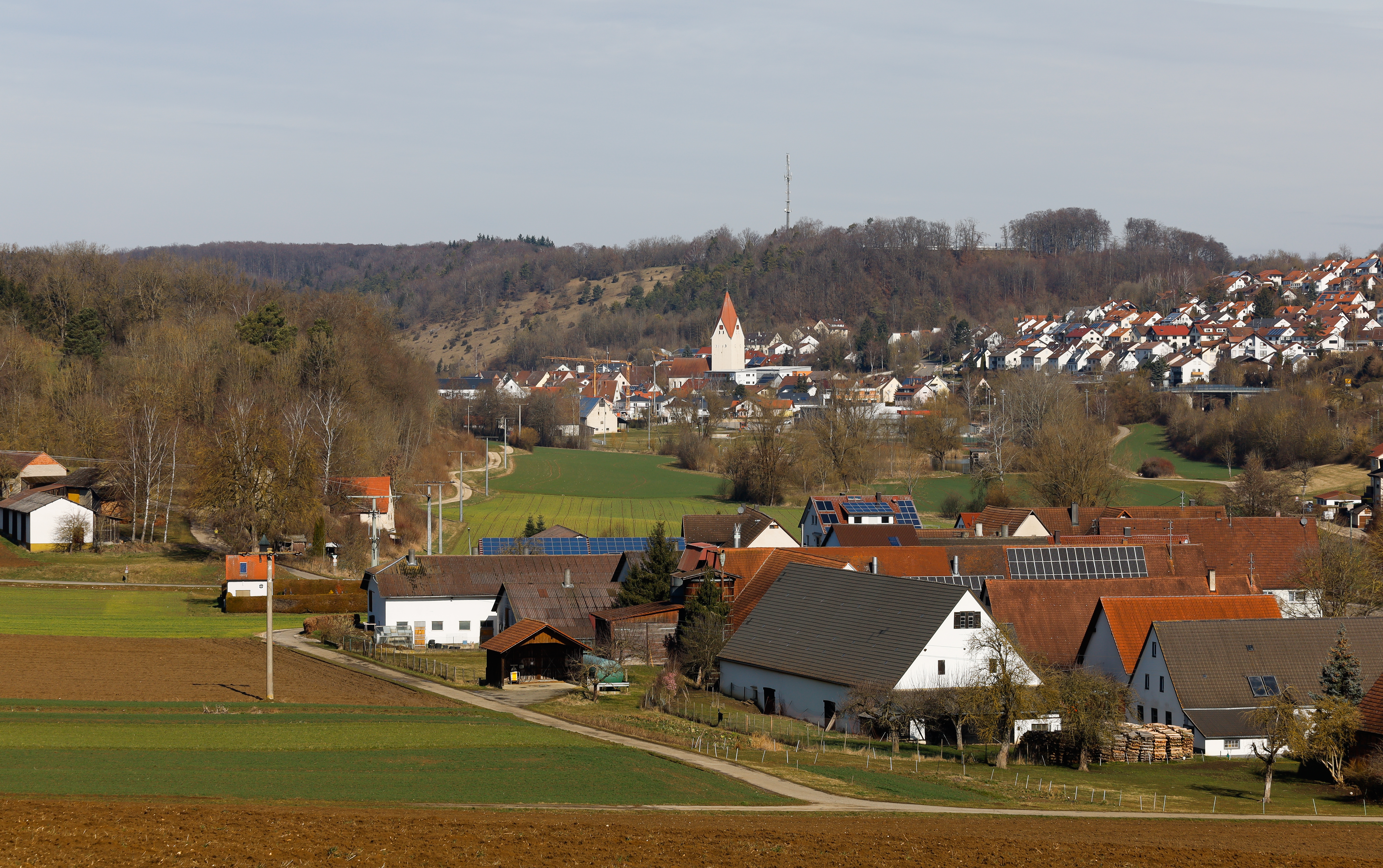

- Coat of arms

- Location of Lonsee within Alb-Donau-Kreis district
- Interactive map of Lonsee
- Location within Germany Location within Baden-Württemberg
- Coordinates: 48°32′36″N 9°55′17″E
- Country: Germany
- State: Baden-Württemberg
- Admin. region: Tübingen
- District: Alb-Donau-Kreis
- Subdivisions: 7

Government
  - Mayor (2023–31): Jochen Ogger (CDU)

Area
  - Total: 43.32 km^{2} (16.73 sq mi)
- Elevation: 564 m (1,850 ft)

Population (2025-12-31)
  - Total: 5,148
  - Density: 118.8/km^{2} (307.8/sq mi)
- Time zone: UTC+01:00 (CET)
  - Summer (DST): UTC+02:00 (CEST)
- Postal codes: 89173
- Dialling codes: 07336
- Vehicle registration: UL
- Website: www.lonsee.de

Lonsee is a municipality in the Alb-Donau district in Baden-Württemberg in Germany. The population of Lonsee in 2021 is 5121; the town consists of 7 villages – Ettlenschieß, Halzhausen, Lonsee, Luizhausen, Radelstetten, Sinabronn, and Urspring. The village has a town hall, two railway stations on the Fils Valley Railway, and two schools. Various clubs and groups provide for an active social life. Lonsee was first mentioned in the year 888, but the remains of a Roman fort in nearby Urspring tell of an even older history. Lonsee has been twinned with the English town of Kingskerswell since 1989.

== Demographics ==
Population development:

Year	Inhabitants
1990	3,733
2001	4,702
2011	4,731
2021	5,121
