= Oberstadion =

- Municipality
- Coat of arms

- Location of Oberstadion within Alb-Donau-Kreis district
- Interactive map of Oberstadion
- Location within Germany Location within Baden-Württemberg
- Coordinates: 48°11′9″N 9°41′30″E
- Country: Germany
- State: Baden-Württemberg
- Admin. region: Tübingen
- District: Alb-Donau-Kreis

Government
  - Mayor (2016–24): Kevin Wiest

Area
  - Total: 15.80 km^{2} (6.10 sq mi)
- Elevation: 532 m (1,745 ft)

Population (2025-12-31)
  - Total: 1,617
  - Density: 102.3/km^{2} (265.1/sq mi)
- Time zone: UTC+01:00 (CET)
  - Summer (DST): UTC+02:00 (CEST)
- Postal codes: 89613
- Dialling codes: 07357 / 07393
- Vehicle registration: UL
- Website: www.oberstadion.de

Oberstadion is a town in the district of Alb-Donau in Baden-Württemberg in Germany.

It contains the following districts: Oberstadion, Hundersingen, Mundeldingen, Moosbeuren, Mühlhausen und Rettighofen.

== Demographics ==
Population development:

Year	Inhabitants
1990	1,286
2001	1,596
2011	1,555
2021	1,597

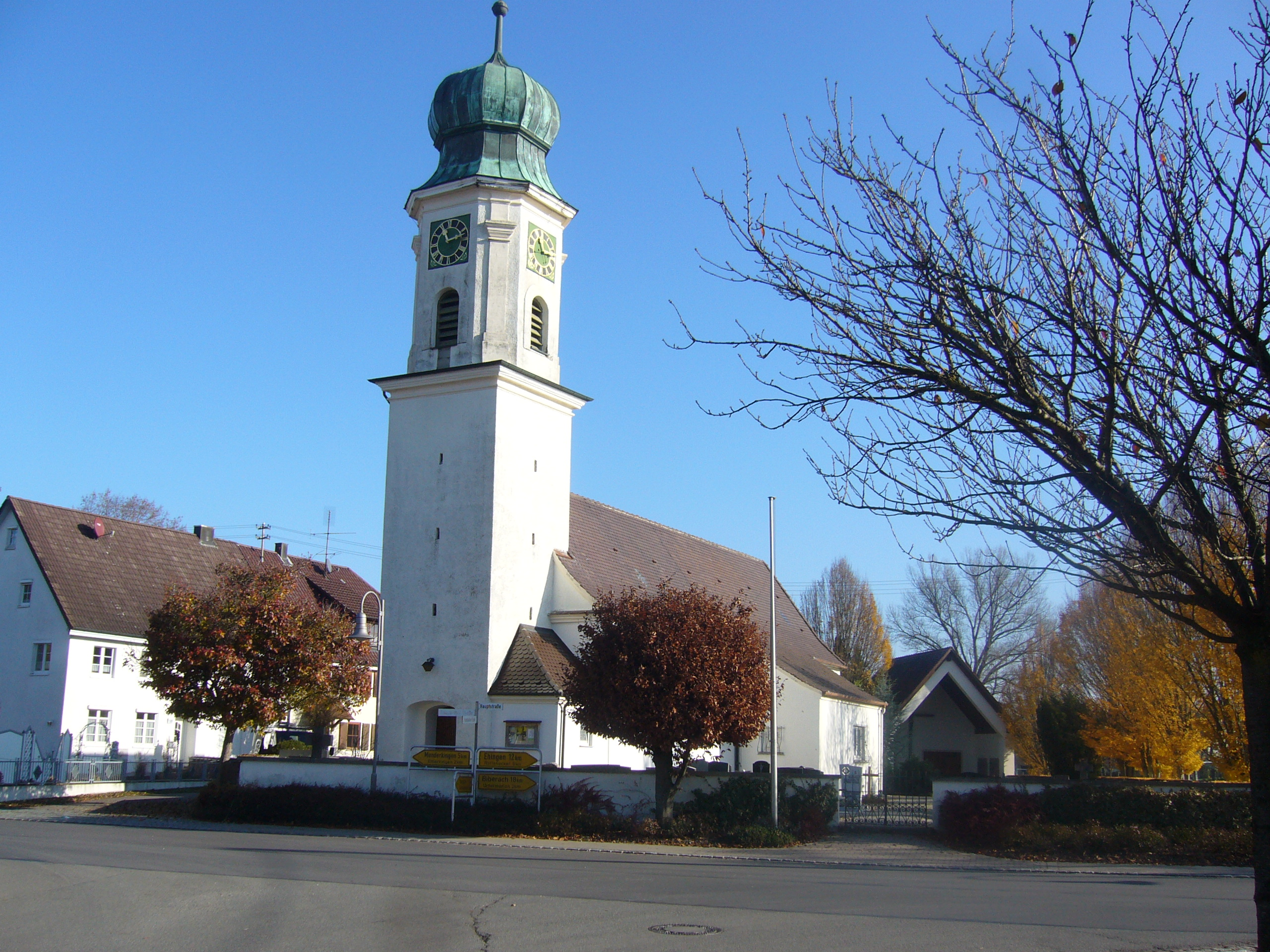
Church in Hundersingen
