= Rammingen =

- Municipality
- Coat of arms

- Location of Rammingen within Alb-Donau-Kreis district
- Interactive map of Rammingen
- Location within Germany Location within Baden-Württemberg
- Coordinates: 48°31′5″N 10°10′21″E
- Country: Germany
- State: Baden-Württemberg
- Admin. region: Tübingen
- District: Alb-Donau-Kreis

Government
  - Mayor (2018–26): Christian Weber

Area
  - Total: 14.03 km^{2} (5.42 sq mi)
- Elevation: 512 m (1,680 ft)

Population (2025-12-31)
  - Total: 1,274
  - Density: 90.81/km^{2} (235.2/sq mi)
- Time zone: UTC+01:00 (CET)
  - Summer (DST): UTC+02:00 (CEST)
- Postal codes: 89192
- Dialling codes: 07345
- Vehicle registration: UL
- Website: www.rammingen-bw.de

Rammingen (German pronunciation: [ˈʁamɪŋən]) is a municipality in the district of Alb-Donau in Baden-Württemberg in Germany.
