= Ballendorf =

- Municipality
- Coat of arms

- Location of Ballendorf within Alb-Donau-Kreis district
- Interactive map of Ballendorf
- Location within Germany Location within Baden-Württemberg
- Coordinates: 48°33′14″N 10°4′38″E
- Country: Germany
- State: Baden-Württemberg
- Admin. region: Tübingen
- District: Alb-Donau-Kreis

Government
  - Mayor: Verena Stämpfle

Area
  - Total: 14.22 km^{2} (5.49 sq mi)
- Elevation: 545 m (1,788 ft)

Population (2025-12-31)
  - Total: 708
  - Density: 49.8/km^{2} (129/sq mi)
- Time zone: UTC+01:00 (CET)
  - Summer (DST): UTC+02:00 (CEST)
- Postal codes: 89177
- Dialling codes: 07340
- Vehicle registration: UL
- Website: www.ballendorf.de

Ballendorf (German pronunciation: [ˈbaləndɔʁf]) is a municipality in the Alb-Donau district, in Baden-Württemberg, Germany.
