= Weidenstetten =

- Municipality
- Coat of arms

- Location of Weidenstetten within Alb-Donau-Kreis district
- Interactive map of Weidenstetten
- Location within Germany Location within Baden-Württemberg
- Coordinates: 48°33′5″N 9°59′39″E
- Country: Germany
- State: Baden-Württemberg
- Admin. region: Tübingen
- District: Alb-Donau-Kreis

Government
  - Mayor (2023–31): Hansjörg Frank (CDU)

Area
  - Total: 17.21 km^{2} (6.64 sq mi)
- Elevation: 585 m (1,919 ft)

Population (2025-12-31)
  - Total: 1,422
  - Density: 82.63/km^{2} (214.0/sq mi)
- Time zone: UTC+01:00 (CET)
  - Summer (DST): UTC+02:00 (CEST)
- Postal codes: 89197
- Dialling codes: 07340
- Vehicle registration: UL
- Website: www.weidenstetten.de

Weidenstetten is a town in the district of Alb-Donau in Baden-Württemberg in Germany.

== Geography ==
Weidenstetten lies about 20 km (12 mi) north of the city of Ulm.

== Politics ==
=== Mayor ===
- 1999–2023: Georg Engler (independent)
- 2023–today: Hansjörg Frank (CDU)

== Notable people ==
- Hieronymus Emser (1478–1527), Catholic theologian and opponent of Martin Luther
- Eberhard Kölsch (1944–2015), German diplomat and ambassador

== Towns twinned with Weidenstetten ==
Roisel (France)
