= Altheim (Alb) =

Place in Baden-Württemberg, Germany

- Municipality
- Coat of arms

- Location of Altheim within Alb-Donau-Kreis district
- Interactive map of Altheim
- Location within Germany Location within Baden-Württemberg
- Coordinates: 48°34′54″N 10°1′37″E
- Country: Germany
- State: Baden-Württemberg
- Admin. region: Tübingen
- District: Alb-Donau-Kreis

Government
  - Mayor (2023–31): Selina Holl

Area
  - Total: 25.77 km^{2} (9.95 sq mi)
- Elevation: 609 m (1,998 ft)

Population (2025-12-31)
  - Total: 1,776
  - Density: 68.92/km^{2} (178.5/sq mi)
- Time zone: UTC+01:00 (CET)
  - Summer (DST): UTC+02:00 (CEST)
- Postal codes: 89174
- Dialling codes: 07340
- Vehicle registration: UL
- Website: www.altheim-alb.de

Altheim (Alb) (German pronunciation: [ˈalthaɪm ˈʔalp]) is a municipality in the Alb-Donau district, in Baden-Württemberg, Germany.
