= Nerenstetten =

- Municipality
- Coat of arms

- Location of Nerenstetten within Alb-Donau-Kreis district
- Interactive map of Nerenstetten
- Location within Germany Location within Baden-Württemberg
- Coordinates: 48°31′44″N 10°5′57″E
- Country: Germany
- State: Baden-Württemberg
- Admin. region: Tübingen
- District: Alb-Donau-Kreis
- Subdivisions: 2

Government
  - Mayor (2014–22): Renate Bobsin

Area
  - Total: 6.09 km^{2} (2.35 sq mi)
- Elevation: 513 m (1,683 ft)

Population (2025-12-31)
  - Total: 377
  - Density: 61.9/km^{2} (160/sq mi)
- Time zone: UTC+01:00 (CET)
  - Summer (DST): UTC+02:00 (CEST)
- Postal codes: 89129
- Dialling codes: 07345
- Vehicle registration: UL
- Website: www.nerenstetten.de

Nerenstetten is a municipality in the district of Alb-Donau in Baden-Württemberg in Germany.

== Demographics ==
Population development:

Year	Inhabitants
1990	321
2001	355
2011	328
2021	352
