= Breitingen =

- Municipality
- Coat of arms

- Location of Breitingen within Alb-Donau-Kreis district
- Interactive map of Breitingen
- Location within Germany Location within Baden-Württemberg
- Coordinates: 48°31′2″N 9°59′32″E
- Country: Germany
- State: Baden-Württemberg
- Admin. region: Tübingen
- District: Alb-Donau-Kreis

Government
  - Mayor (2020–28): Dieter Mühlberger

Area
  - Total: 2.89 km^{2} (1.12 sq mi)
- Elevation: 522 m (1,713 ft)

Population (2025-12-31)
  - Total: 337
  - Density: 117/km^{2} (302/sq mi)
- Time zone: UTC+01:00 (CET)
  - Summer (DST): UTC+02:00 (CEST)
- Postal codes: 89183
- Dialling codes: 07340
- Vehicle registration: UL
- Website: www.breitingen-lonetal.de

Breitingen (German pronunciation: [ˈbʁaɪtɪŋən]) is a municipality in the district of Alb-Donau in Baden-Württemberg in Germany.
