= Bernstadt (Alb) =

- Municipality
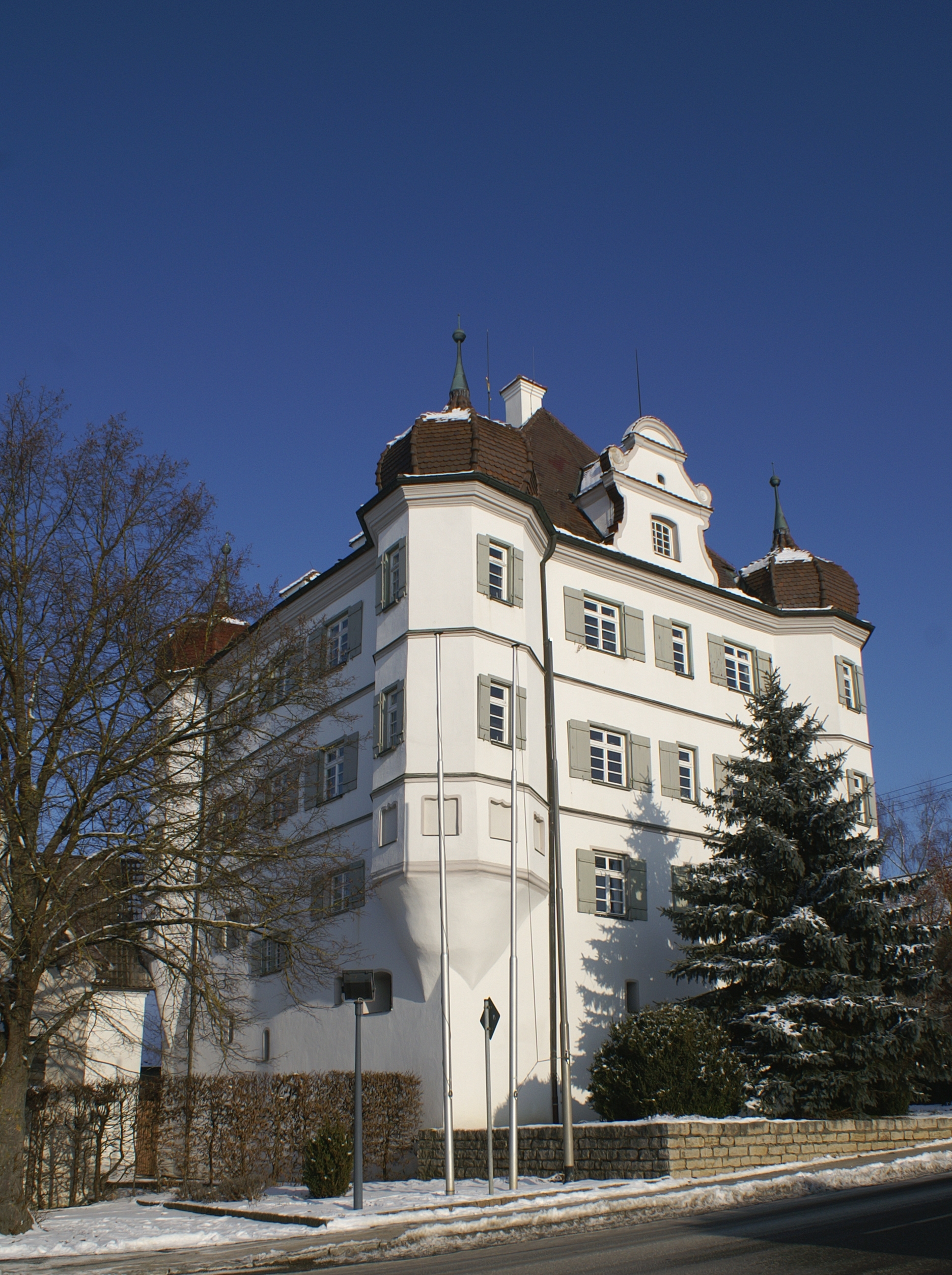
- Bernstadt Palace housing the town administration and regional museum

- Coat of arms

- Location of Bernstadt within Alb-Donau-Kreis district
- Interactive map of Bernstadt
- Location within Germany Location within Baden-Württemberg
- Coordinates: 48°29′59″N 10°1′30″E
- Country: Germany
- State: Baden-Württemberg
- Admin. region: Tübingen
- District: Alb-Donau-Kreis

Government
  - Mayor (2021–29): Oliver Sühring

Area
  - Total: 13.95 km^{2} (5.39 sq mi)
- Elevation: 551 m (1,808 ft)

Population (2025-12-31)
  - Total: 2,339
  - Density: 167.7/km^{2} (434.3/sq mi)
- Time zone: UTC+01:00 (CET)
  - Summer (DST): UTC+02:00 (CEST)
- Postal codes: 89182
- Dialling codes: 07348
- Vehicle registration: UL
- Website: www.bernstadt-wuertt.de

Bernstadt (German pronunciation: [ˈbɛʁnʃtat]) is a municipality in the district of Alb-Donau in Baden-Württemberg in Germany.
