= Nordvorpommern =

District in Mecklenburg-Vorpommern, Germany

Coordinates: 54°10′N 12°50′E

- District
- Flag Coat of arms

- Country: Germany
- State: Mecklenburg-Western Pomerania
- Founded: 1994
- Disbanded: 2011
- Capital: Grimmen

Area
  - Total: 2,168 km^{2} (837 sq mi)

Population (2010-12-31)
  - Total: 105,547
  - Density: 49/km^{2} (130/sq mi)
- Time zone: UTC+01:00 (CET)
  - Summer (DST): UTC+02:00 (CEST)
- Vehicle registration: NVP
- Website: http://www.lk-nvp.de

Nordvorpommern ("North Western Pomerania") was a Kreis (district) in the northern part of Mecklenburg-Vorpommern, Germany. It was situated at the coast of the Baltic Sea, where it enclosed the city of Stralsund. Further to the northeast, separated from Stralsund and Nordvorpommern by the Strelasund, lies the island of Rügen, administratively part of the eponymous district. Other neighboring districts are (from east clockwise) Ostvorpommern, Demmin, Güstrow and Bad Doberan.

== Geography ==
The coast is characterised by an elongated peninsula, the Darß. Between the Darß and the mainland there is a very shallow lagoon, which is a part of the Western Pomerania Lagoon Area National Park, just as the entire peninsula itself.

== History ==
In history this region was the westernmost part of Pomerania. Until 1819 it was a Swedish, after that Prussian territory called Neuvorpommern.

Nordvorpommern District was established in 1994 by merging the three previous districts of Grimmen, Ribnitz-Damgarten and Stralsund. On 4 September 2011, it was merged into Vorpommern-Rügen.

== Coat of arms ==
The coat of arms shows two griffins. The golden griffin to the left is the symbol of Princes of Rostock. The black griffin to the right derives from the coat of arms of Pomerania, which however used a red griffin as their symbol. The territory of the district was ruled by a branch of the Dukes of Pomerania which used a black griffin.

The coat of arms was granted on December 3, 1997.

== Towns and municipalities ==
The subdivisions of the district were (situation August 2011):

Amt-free towns
1. Grimmen
2. Marlow
Amt-free municipalities
1. Süderholz
2. Zingst

Ämter
| 1. Altenpleen; 1. Altenpleen^{1}; 2. Groß Mohrdorf; 3. Klausdorf; 4. Kramerhof; 5. Preetz; 6. Prohn; 2. Barth; 1. Bartelshagen^{3}; 2. Barth^{1, 2}; 3. Divitz-Spoldershagen; 4. Fuhlendorf; 5. Karnin; 6. Kenz-Küstrow; 7. Löbnitz; 8. Lüdershagen; 9. Pruchten; 10. Saal; 11. Trinwillershagen; 3. Darß/Fischland; 1. Ahrenshoop; 2. Born^{1}; 3. Dierhagen; 4. Prerow; 5. Wieck am Darß; 6. Wustrow | 4. Franzburg-Richtenberg; 1. Franzburg^{1, 2}; 2. Glewitz; 3. Gremersdorf-Buchholz; 4. Millienhagen-Oebelitz; 5. Papenhagen; 6. Richtenberg^{2}; 7. Splietsdorf; 8. Velgast; 9. Weitenhagen; 10. Wendisch Baggendorf; 5. Miltzow; 1. Elmenhorst; 2. Sundhagen^{1}; 3. Wittenhagen; 6. Niepars; 1. Groß Kordshagen; 2. Jakobsdorf; 3. Kummerow; 4. Lüssow; 5. Neu Bartelshagen; 6. Niepars^{1}; 7. Pantelitz; 8. Steinhagen; 9. Wendorf; 10. Zarrendorf | 7. Recknitz-Trebeltal; 1. Bad Sülze^{2}; 2. Dettmannsdorf; 3. Deyelsdorf; 4. Drechow; 5. Eixen; 6. Grammendorf; 7. Gransebieth; 8. Hugoldsdorf; 9. Lindholz; 10. Tribsees^{1, 2}; 8. Ribnitz-Damgarten; 1. Ahrenshagen-Daskow; 2. Ribnitz-Damgarten^{1, 2}; 3. Schlemmin; 4. Semlow |
^{1} - seat of the Amt; ^{2} - town; ^{3} - former town/municipality
