= Steinhagen =

Steinhagen may refer to the following municipalities in Germany:

- Steinhagen, North Rhine-Westphalia, in the district of Gütersloh, North Rhine-Westphalia
- Steinhagen, Rostock, in the district of Rostock, Mecklenburg-Vorpommern
- Steinhagen, Vorpommern-Rügen, in the district Vorpommern-Rügen, Mecklenburg-Vorpommern

Steinhagen may also refer to the following:

- Steinhagen (street), street in the municipality of Strand, Norway
