= Torfkuhlen Bad Sülze =

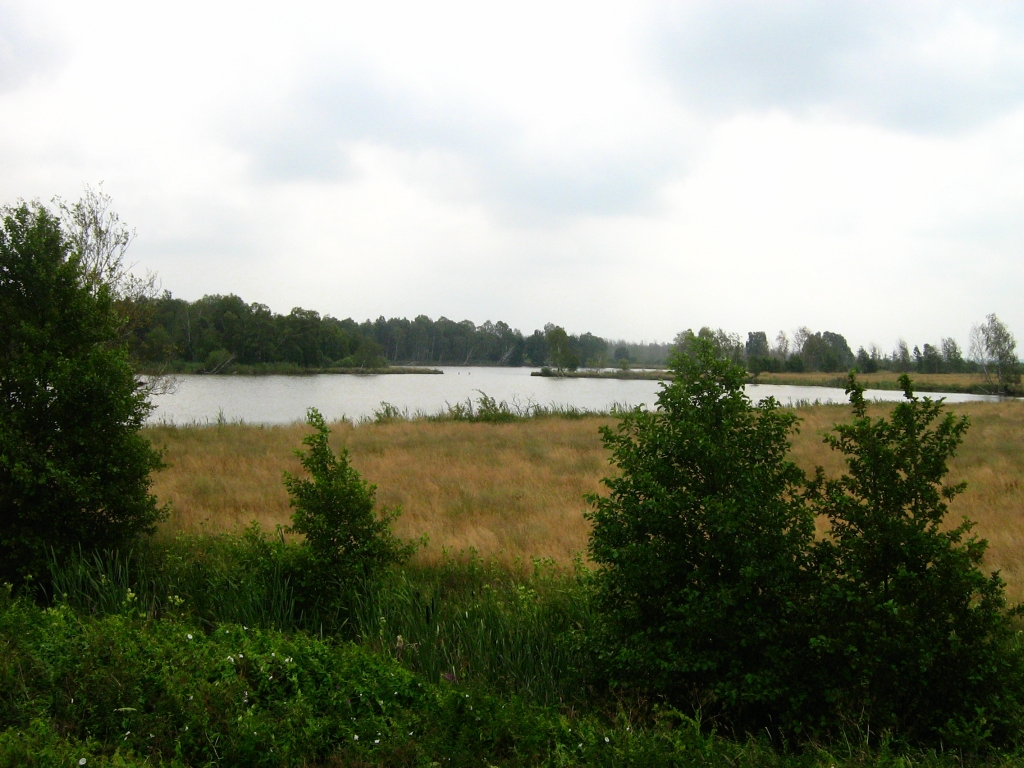

- Location within Mecklenburg-Vorpommern
- Location: Vorpommern-Rügen, Mecklenburg-Vorpommern
- Coordinates: 54°6′29.98″N 12°41′20.53″E
- Type: artificial lake
- Basin countries: Germany
- Surface area: 0.27 km^{2} (0.10 sq mi)
- Surface elevation: 1.8 m (5 ft 11 in)

Torfkuhlen Bad Sülze is a group of three lakes at Bad Sülze in Vorpommern-Rügen, Mecklenburg-Vorpommern, Germany. At an elevation of 1.8 m, its surface area is 0.27 km^{2}.
