= Bartelshagen =

- Ortsteil of Saal
- Interactive map of Bartelshagen
- Location within Germany Location within Mecklenburg-Vorpommern
- Coordinates: 54°18′N 12°35′E
- Country: Germany
- State: Mecklenburg-Vorpommern
- District: Vorpommern-Rügen
- Municipality: Saal

Area
  - Total: 14.49 km^{2} (5.59 sq mi)
- Elevation: 7 m (23 ft)

Population (2012-12-31)
  - Total: 387
  - Density: 26.7/km^{2} (69.2/sq mi)
- Time zone: UTC+01:00 (CET)
  - Summer (DST): UTC+02:00 (CEST)
- Postal codes: 18314
- Dialling codes: 038227
- Vehicle registration: NVP
- Website: www.amt-barth.de/bartelshagen

Bartelshagen is a village and a former municipality in the Vorpommern-Rügen district, in Mecklenburg-Vorpommern, Germany. Since 1 January 2014, it is part of the municipality Saal.
