= Drechow =

- Municipality
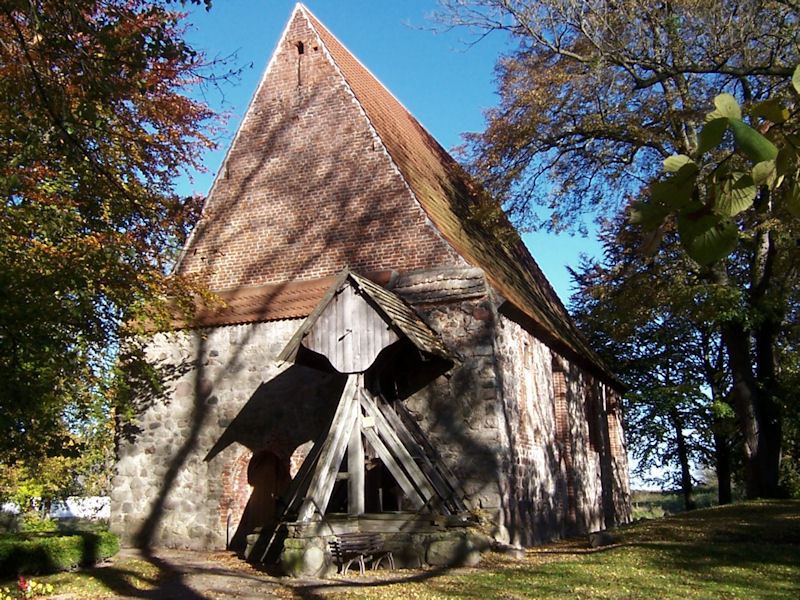
- Drechow Church

- Location of Drechow within Vorpommern-Rügen district
- Interactive map of Drechow
- Location within Germany Location within Mecklenburg-Vorpommern
- Coordinates: 54°08′N 12°48′E
- Country: Germany
- State: Mecklenburg-Vorpommern
- District: Vorpommern-Rügen
- Municipal assoc.: Recknitz-Trebeltal

Government
  - Mayor: Heiko Schütze

Area
  - Total: 15.51 km^{2} (5.99 sq mi)
- Elevation: 19 m (62 ft)

Population (2025-12-31)
  - Total: 200
  - Density: 13/km^{2} (33/sq mi)
- Time zone: UTC+01:00 (CET)
  - Summer (DST): UTC+02:00 (CEST)
- Postal codes: 18465
- Dialling codes: 038320
- Vehicle registration: NVP
- Website: www.drechow.de

Drechow is a municipality in the Vorpommern-Rügen district, in Mecklenburg-Vorpommern, Germany. Drechow is approximately 184 km by road north of Germany's capital, Berlin, and is very close to the city of Bad Sülze which is of historical significance and known for its Salt Museum and spa system.
