= Dettmannsdorf =

- Municipality
- Location of Dettmannsdorf within Vorpommern-Rügen district
- Interactive map of Dettmannsdorf
- Location within Germany Location within Mecklenburg-Vorpommern
- Coordinates: 54°06′N 12°31′E
- Country: Germany
- State: Mecklenburg-Vorpommern
- District: Vorpommern-Rügen
- Municipal assoc.: Recknitz-Trebeltal

Government
  - Mayor: Stefan Schmidt

Area
  - Total: 44.52 km^{2} (17.19 sq mi)
- Elevation: 37 m (121 ft)

Population (2025-12-31)
  - Total: 1,011
  - Density: 22.71/km^{2} (58.82/sq mi)
- Time zone: UTC+01:00 (CET)
  - Summer (DST): UTC+02:00 (CEST)
- Postal codes: 18334
- Dialling codes: 038228
- Vehicle registration: NVP
- Website: www.recknitz-trebeltal.de

Dettmannsdorf (German pronunciation: [ˈdɛtmansˌdɔʁf]) is a municipality in the Vorpommern-Rügen district, in Mecklenburg-Vorpommern, Germany. The municipality is located south-west of Ribnitz-Damgarten in the Recknitz valley. Until January 1, 1999, it belonged to Amt Trebeltal and now belongs to Amt Recknitz-Trebeltal.

== Geography and Transportation ==
Dettmannsdorf is located about 25 kilometers east of the Hanseatic city of Rostock and about 9 kilometers west of Bad Sülze. The closest highway is the Bundesautobahn 20 (A20), which is located south of the municipality and can be reached by the on-ramps Tribsees and Sanitz.

The municipality consists of these localities:

- Dettmannsdorf
- Dettmannsdorf-Kölzow
- Kölzow
- Wöpkendorf
- Dammerstorf
- Dudendorf
- Kucksdorf

== History ==
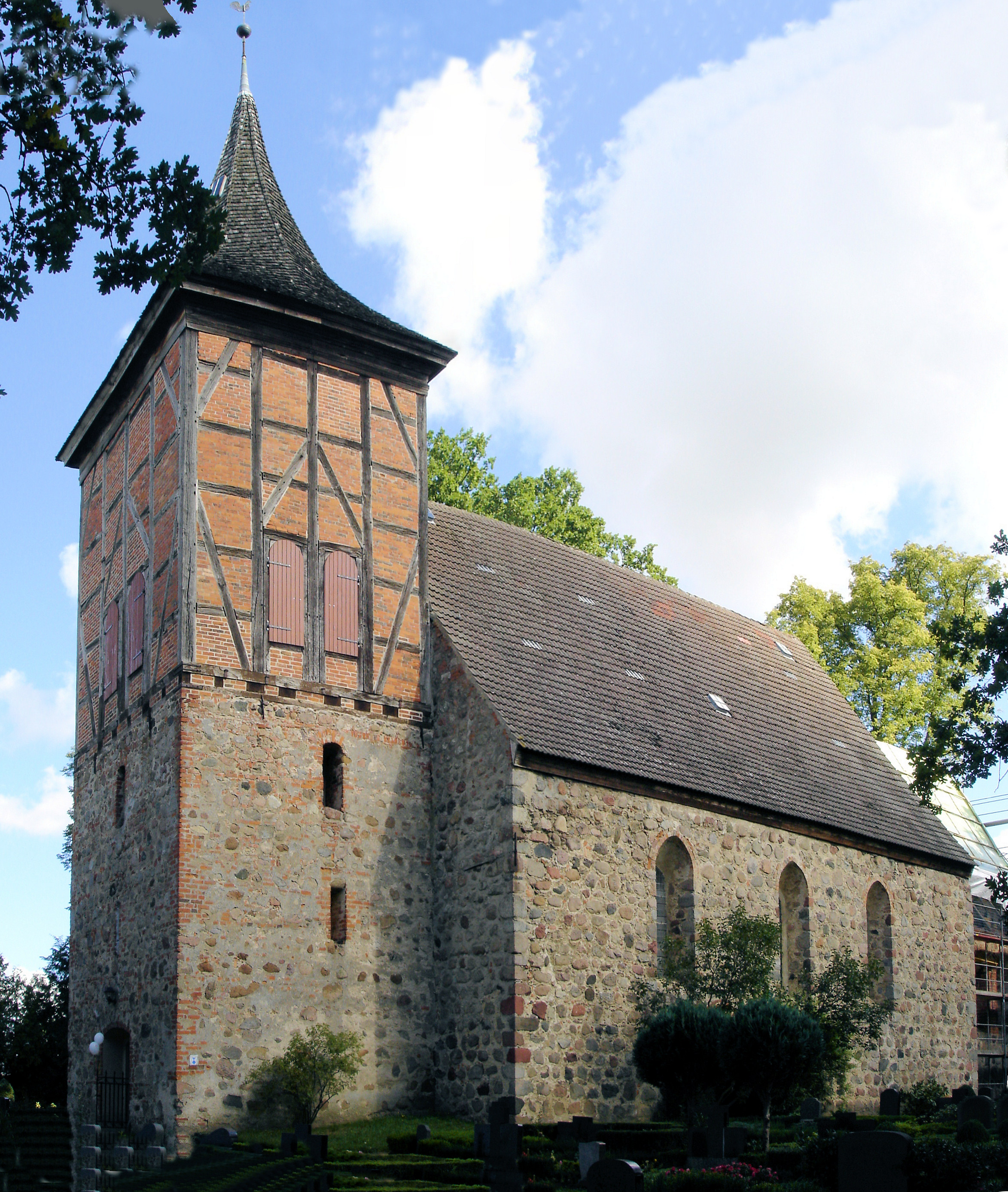
Feldsteinkirche Kölzow

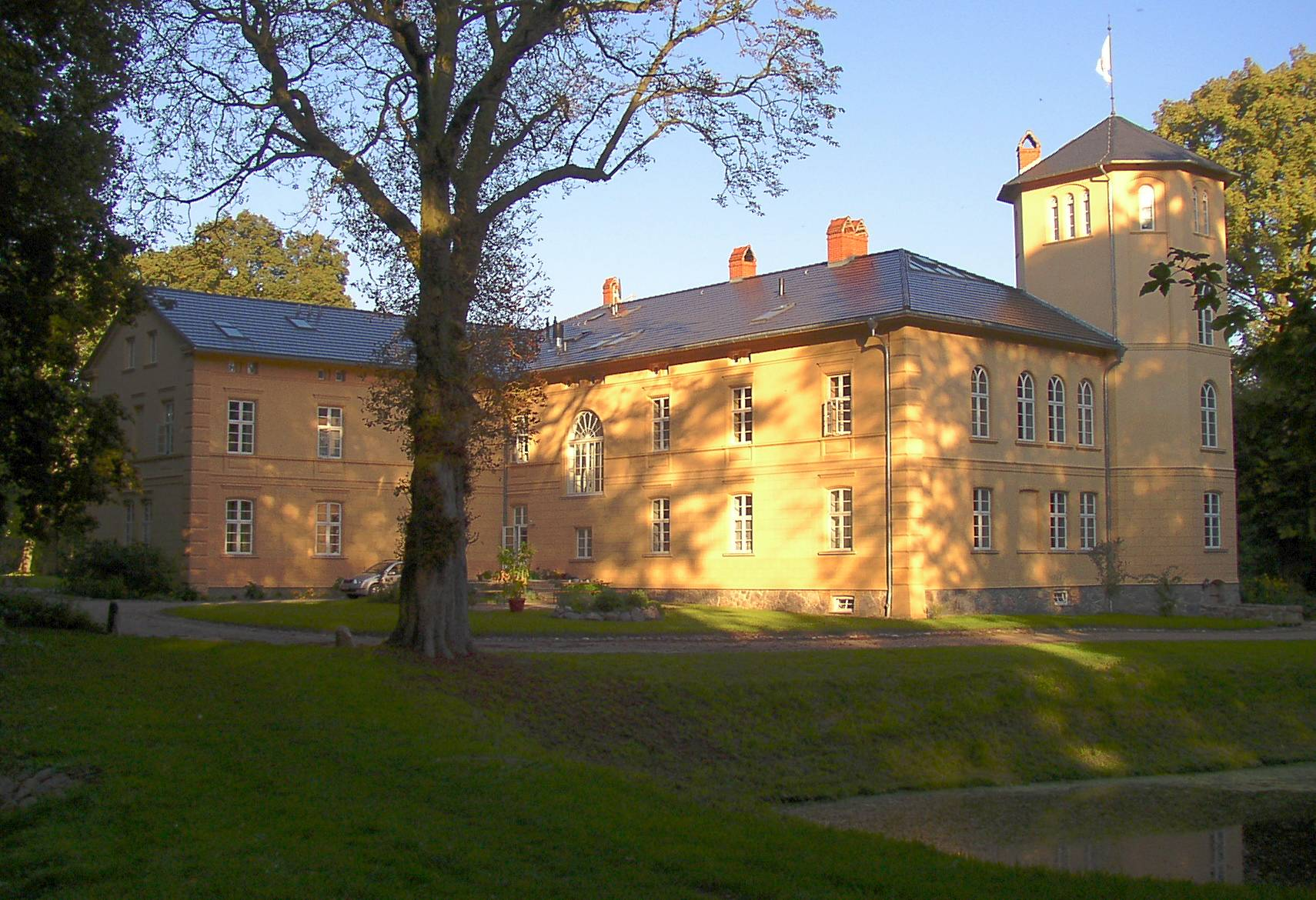
Castle Kölzow

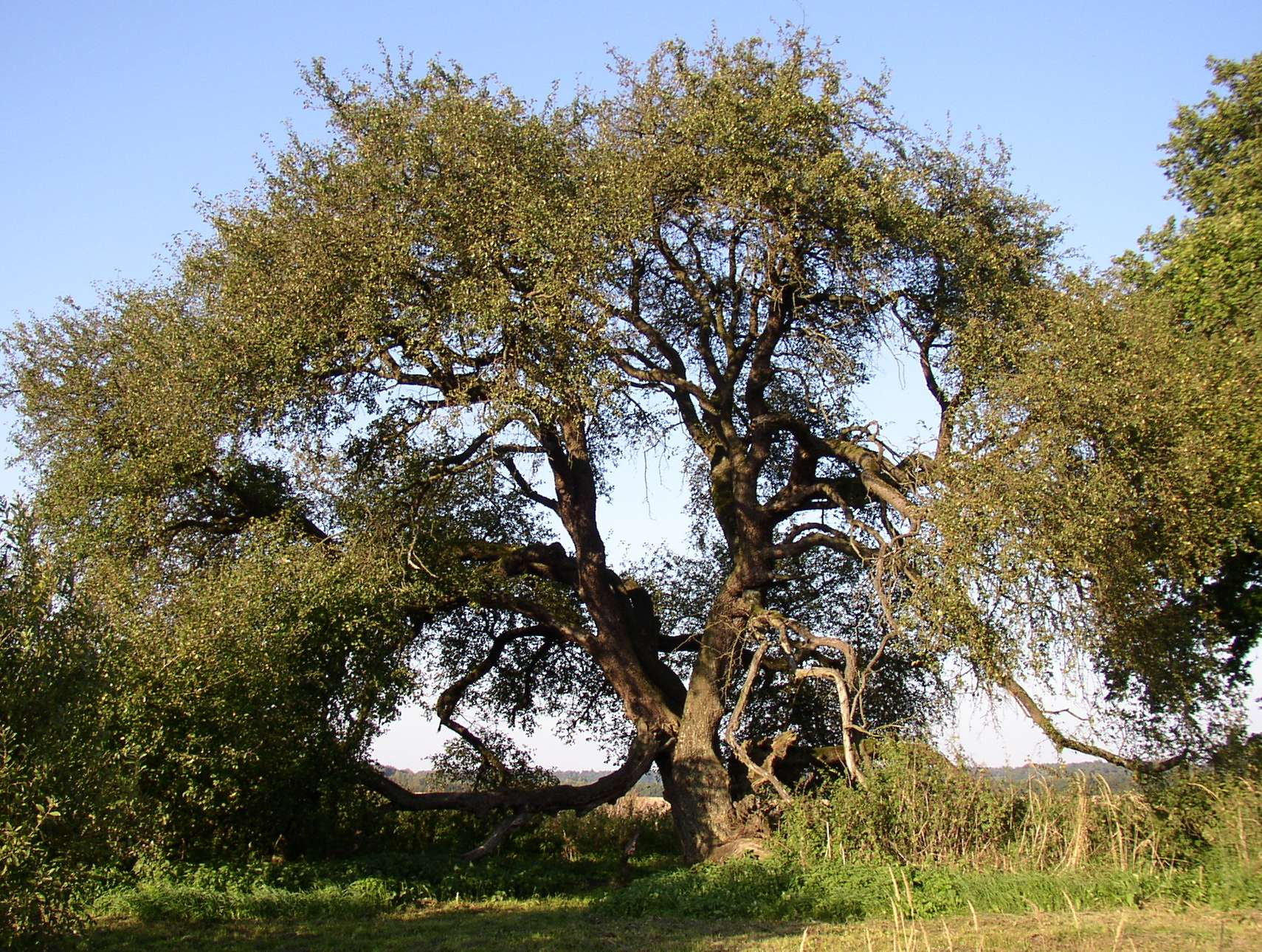
Germany's oldest wild apple tree

Kölzow was first mentioned in a document in 1233. The church of Kölzow was built in 1205 and is possibly one of the oldest churches in Northern Germany. Since January 1, 2001, Dudendorf belongs to the municipality Dettmannsdorf.

== Places of interest ==
- Feldsteinkirche in Kölzow, built in 1205.
- Castle Kölzow: built around 1850 by the von Prollius family at the site of older manor houses of the von der Lühe family. In 1925, it became the summer residency of Prince Friedrich Sigismund von Preußen and remained family property until 1945. In 2000, the von der Lühe family bought the estate and restored the castle.
- Oldest wild apple tree in Germany: located between Stubbendorf and Ehmkendorf, the tree is an estimated 450 years old.
