= Schloss Hohendorf =

Palace in Groß Mohrdorf, Germany

- Groß Mohrdorf, Mecklenburg-Vorpommern
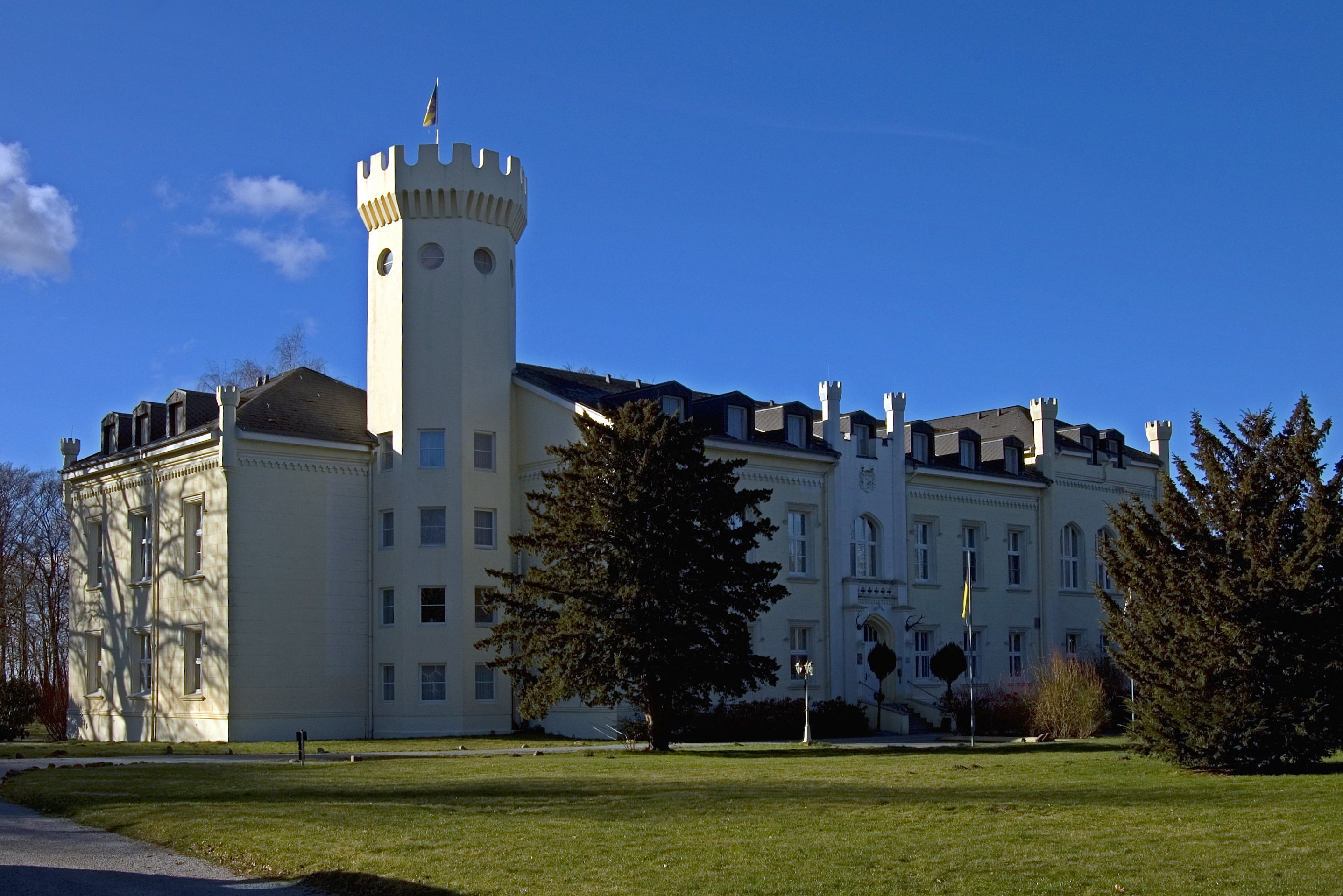
- Schloss Hohendorf

Site information
- Type: Schloss

Location
- Coordinates: 54.3975°N 12.976667°E

Schloss Hohendorf is a Schloss in Groß Mohrdorf municipality, Germany.

== History ==
The history of the estate goes back to 1321, when the ruler of Rügen Vitslav III donated the land to the Hup family. The main building that is presently visible was built in 1854 for the von Klot-Trautvetter family. It was rebuilt in 1900. A renovation was carried out in 1993.
