= Prohn =

- Municipality
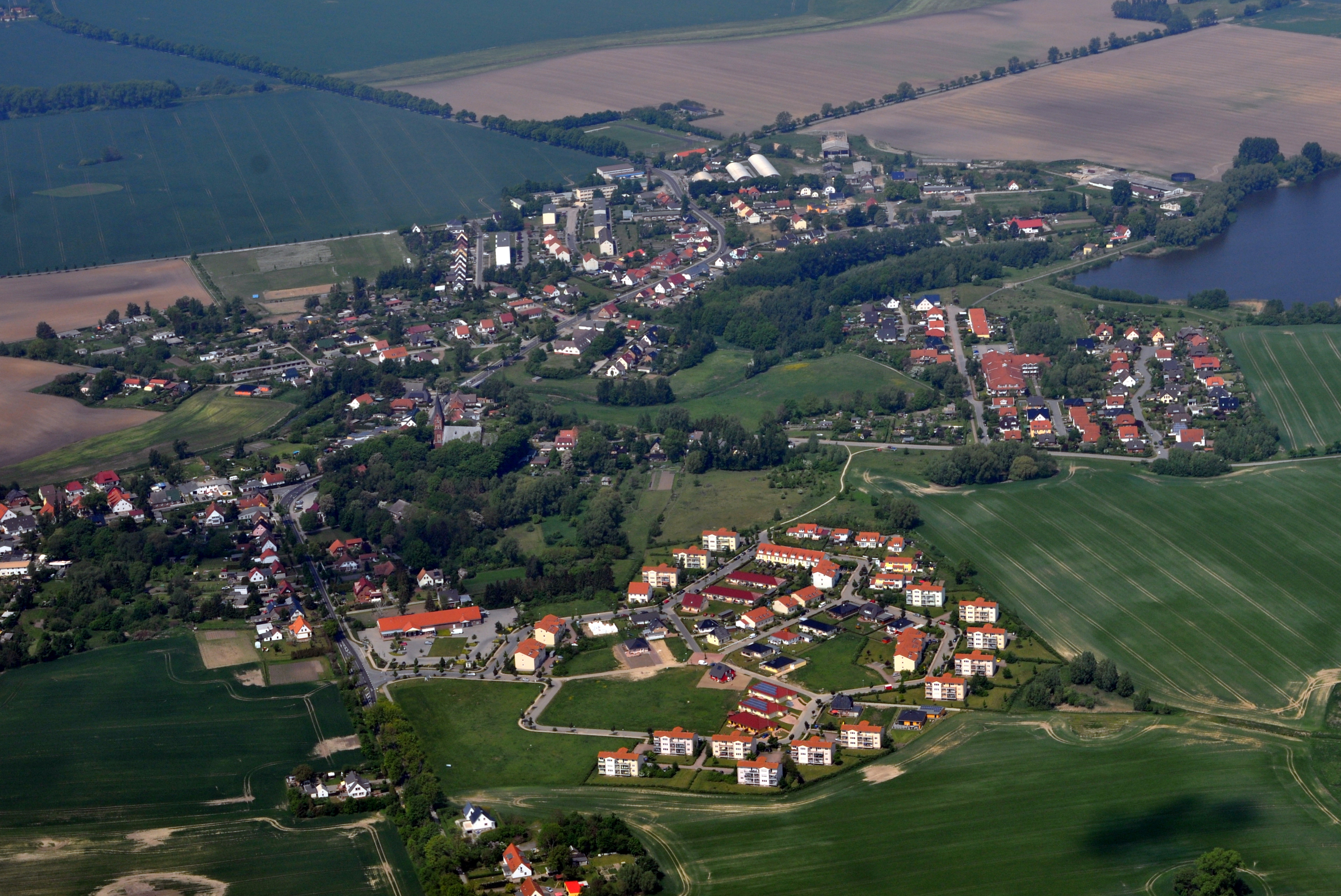
- Aerial view

- Coat of arms

- Location of Prohn within Vorpommern-Rügen district
- Interactive map of Prohn
- Location within Germany Location within Mecklenburg-Vorpommern
- Coordinates: 54°22′N 13°01′E
- Country: Germany
- State: Mecklenburg-Vorpommern
- District: Vorpommern-Rügen
- Municipal assoc.: Altenpleen

Government
  - Mayor: Stefan Schindler

Area
  - Total: 16.2 km^{2} (6.3 sq mi)
- Elevation: 0.5 m (1.6 ft)

Population (2025-12-31)
  - Total: 2,120
  - Density: 131/km^{2} (339/sq mi)
- Time zone: UTC+01:00 (CET)
  - Summer (DST): UTC+02:00 (CEST)
- Postal codes: 18445
- Dialling codes: 038323
- Vehicle registration: NVP / VR since 2011
- Website: www.prohn.de

Prohn (German pronunciation: [pʁoːn]) is a municipality in the Vorpommern-Rügen district, in Mecklenburg-Vorpommern, Germany.

The Prohner Stausee is located in Prohn.
