= Günzer See =

Lake in Mecklenburg-Vorpommern, Germany

- Location within Mecklenburg-Vorpommern
- Location: Vorpommern-Rügen, Mecklenburg-Vorpommern
- Coordinates: 54.35998°N 12.8999°E
- Basin countries: Germany
- Surface area: 0.157 km^{2} (0.061 sq mi)
- Surface elevation: 0.3 m (1 ft 0 in)

Günzer See is a lake in the Vorpommern-Rügen district in Mecklenburg-Vorpommern, Germany. At an elevation of 0.3 m, its surface area is 0.157 km^{2}.
