= Wendorf, Mecklenburg-Vorpommern =

- Municipality
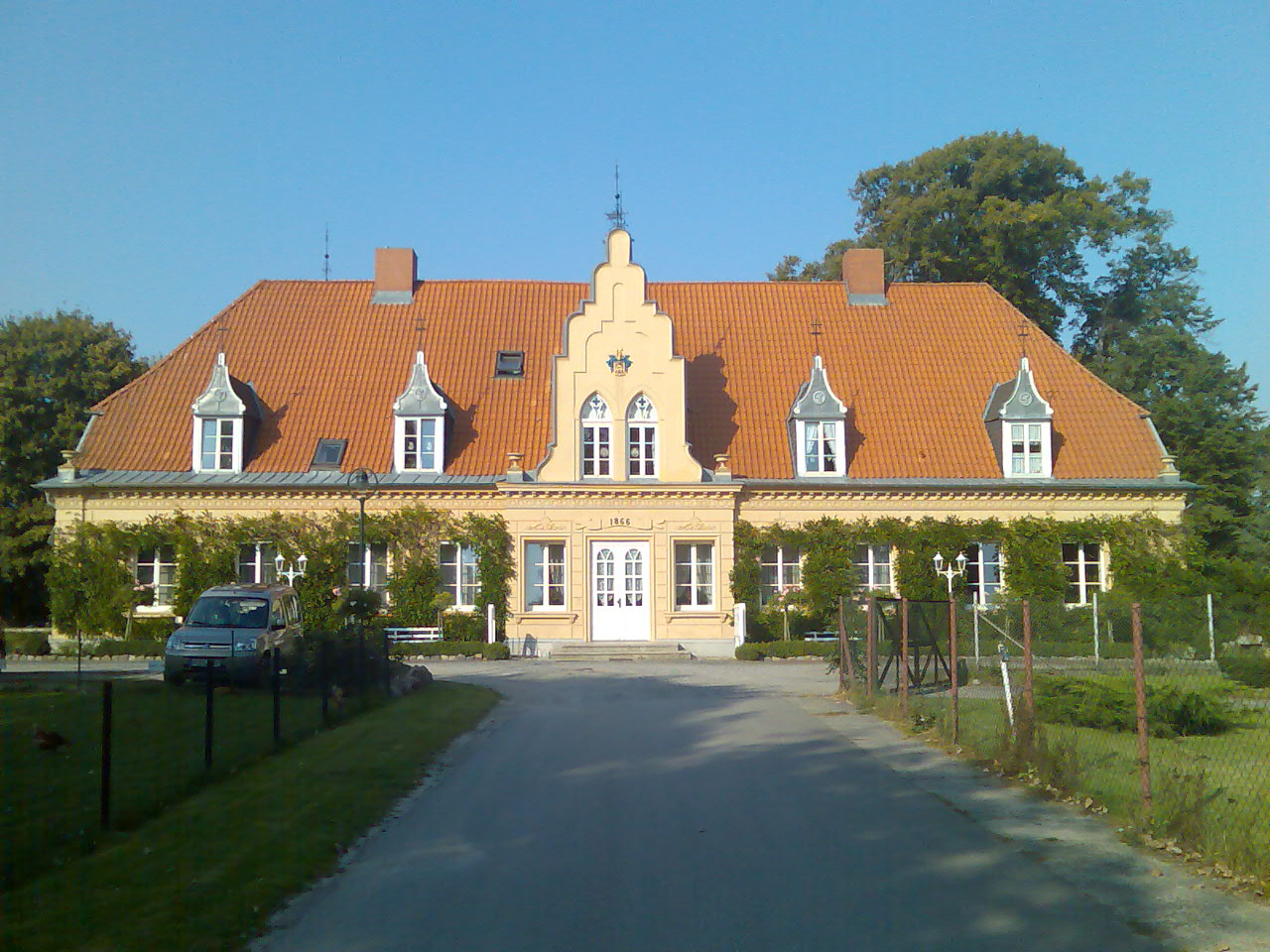
- Manor in Groß-Lüdershagen (Wendorf)

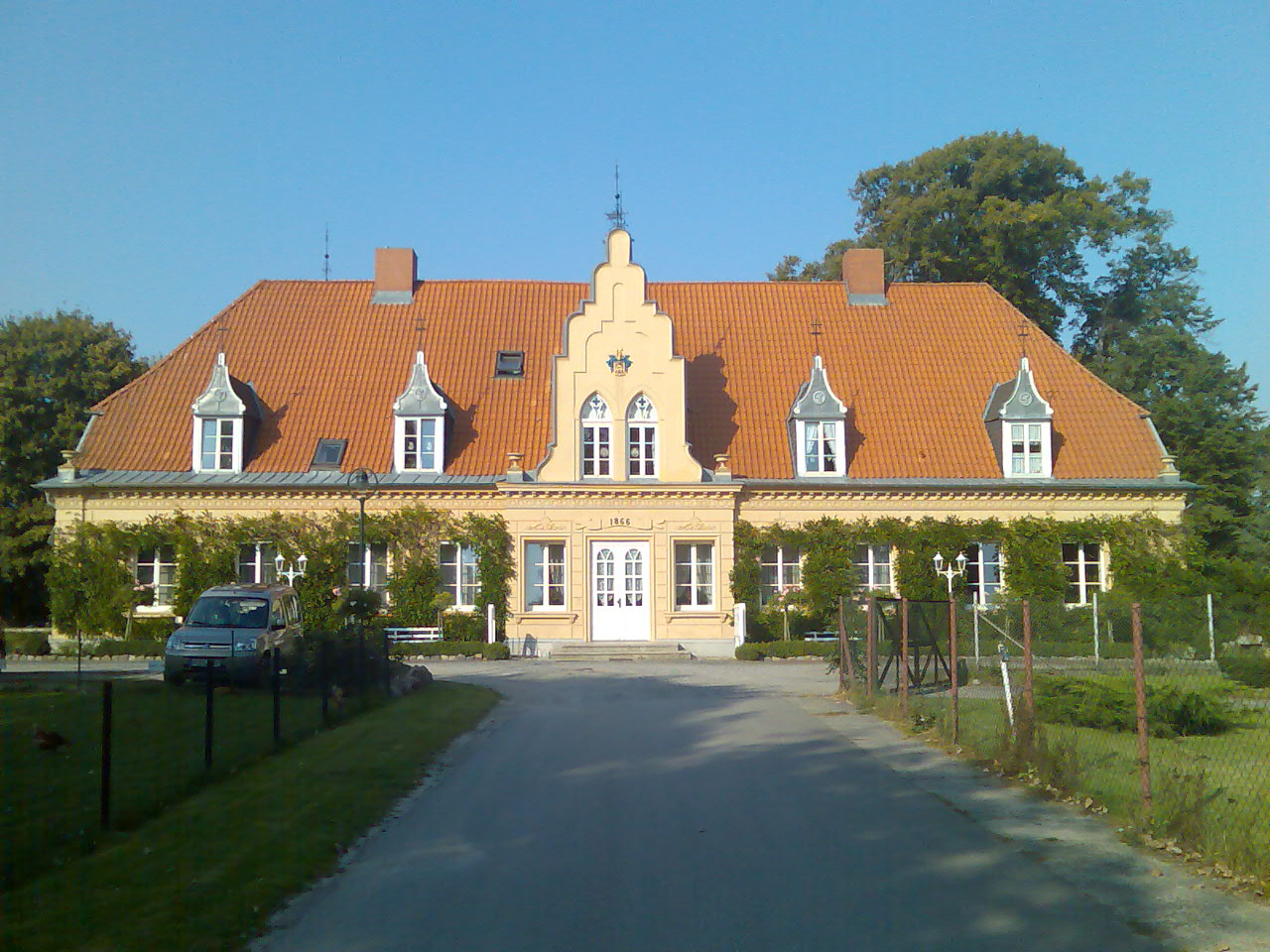
- Location of Wendorf, Mecklenburg-Vorpommern within Vorpommern-Rügen district
- Interactive map of Wendorf, Mecklenburg-Vorpommern
- Location within Germany Location within Mecklenburg-Vorpommern
- Coordinates: 54°15′N 13°04′E
- Country: Germany
- State: Mecklenburg-Vorpommern
- District: Vorpommern-Rügen
- Municipal assoc.: Niepars

Government
  - Mayor: Heinz-Werner Jennek

Area
  - Total: 15.68 km^{2} (6.05 sq mi)
- Elevation: 8 m (26 ft)

Population (2025-12-31)
  - Total: 854
  - Density: 54.5/km^{2} (141/sq mi)
- Time zone: UTC+01:00 (CET)
  - Summer (DST): UTC+02:00 (CEST)
- Postal codes: 18442
- Dialling codes: 03831
- Vehicle registration: NVP
- Website: www.amt-niepars.de

Wendorf is a municipality in the Vorpommern-Rügen district, in Mecklenburg-Vorpommern, Germany.
