= Semlow =

- Municipality
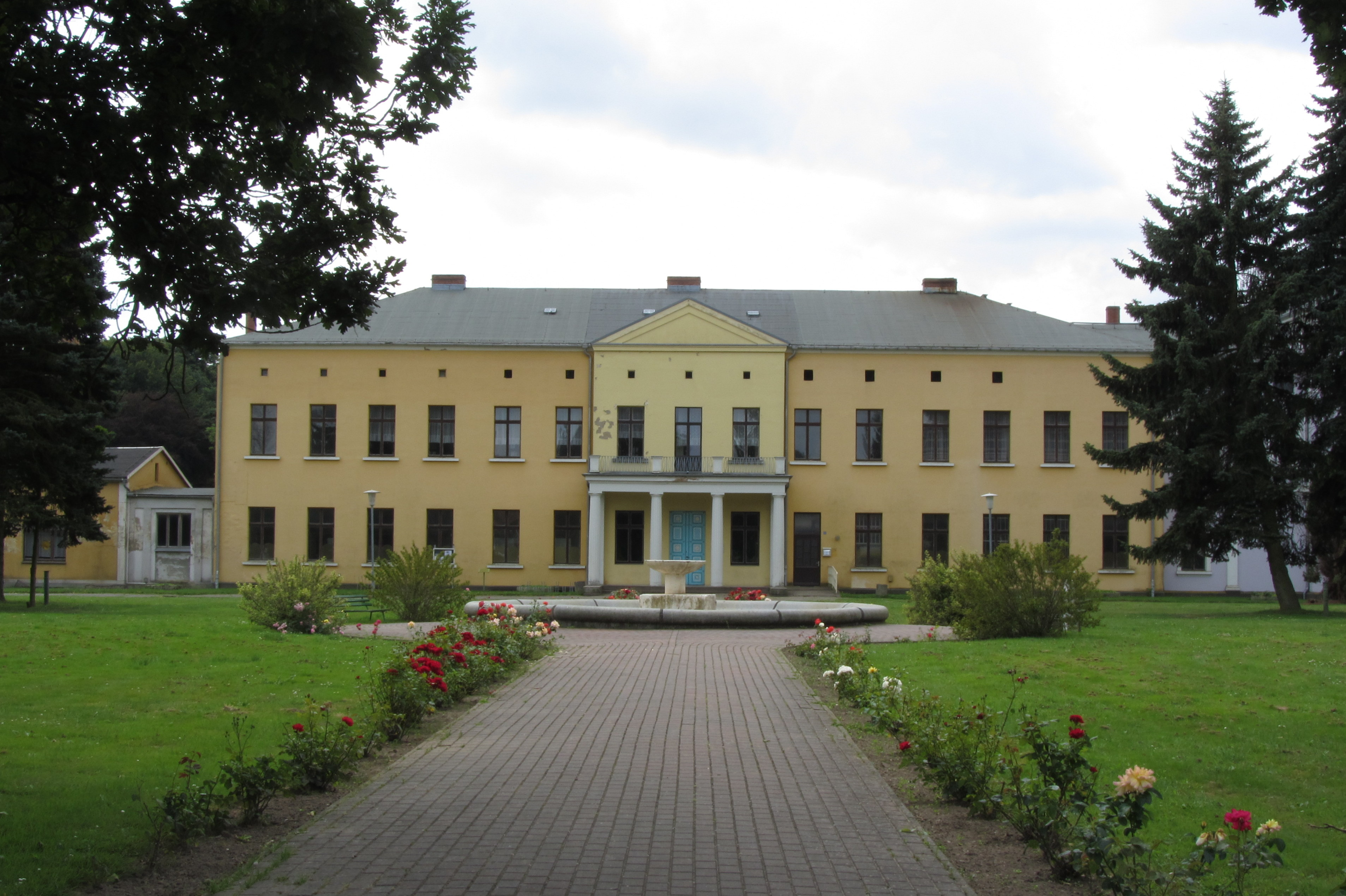
- Schloss Semlow in Semlow

- Coat of arms

- Location of Semlow within Vorpommern-Rügen district
- Interactive map of Semlow
- Location within Germany Location within Mecklenburg-Vorpommern
- Coordinates: 54°11′N 12°39′E
- Country: Germany
- State: Mecklenburg-Vorpommern
- District: Vorpommern-Rügen
- Municipal assoc.: Ribnitz-Damgarten

Government
  - Mayor: Siegfried Schulze

Area
  - Total: 34.38 km^{2} (13.27 sq mi)
- Elevation: 28 m (92 ft)

Population (2025-12-31)
  - Total: 636
  - Density: 18.5/km^{2} (47.9/sq mi)
- Time zone: UTC+01:00 (CET)
  - Summer (DST): UTC+02:00 (CEST)
- Postal codes: 18334
- Dialling codes: 038222
- Vehicle registration: NVP
- Website: www.ribnitz-damgarten.de

Semlow is a municipality in the Vorpommern-Rügen district, in Mecklenburg-Vorpommern, Germany.
