= Süderholz =

- Municipality
- Location of Süderholz within Vorpommern-Rügen district
- Interactive map of Süderholz
- Location within Germany Location within Mecklenburg-Vorpommern
- Coordinates: 54°05′N 13°08′E
- Country: Germany
- State: Mecklenburg-Vorpommern
- District: Vorpommern-Rügen

Government
  - Mayor: Alexander Benkert

Area
  - Total: 148.96 km^{2} (57.51 sq mi)
- Elevation: 10 m (33 ft)

Population (2025-12-31)
  - Total: 3,913
  - Density: 26.27/km^{2} (68.04/sq mi)
- Time zone: UTC+01:00 (CET)
  - Summer (DST): UTC+02:00 (CEST)
- Postal codes: 18516
- Dialling codes: 038331
- Vehicle registration: NVP
- Website: www.suderholz.de

Süderholz is a municipality in the Vorpommern-Rügen district, in Mecklenburg-Vorpommern, Germany. It was created as a merger from several municipalities on 1 January 1999 (indicated in italics) and comprises the following villages:

- Bartmannshagen
- Willerswalde
- Kaschow
- Griebenow
- Kreutzmannshagen
- Willershusen
- Klein Bisdorf
- Schmietkow
- Kandelin
- Zarnewanz
- Lüssow
- Groß Bisdorf
- Neuendorf
- Wüsteney
- Wüst Eldena
- Behnkenhagen
- Prützmannshagen
- Klevenow
- Barkow
- Boltenhagen
- Poggendorf
- Wüstenbilow
- Gülzow-Dorf
- Rakow
- Bretwisch
- Dönnie
- Grischow
- Grabow

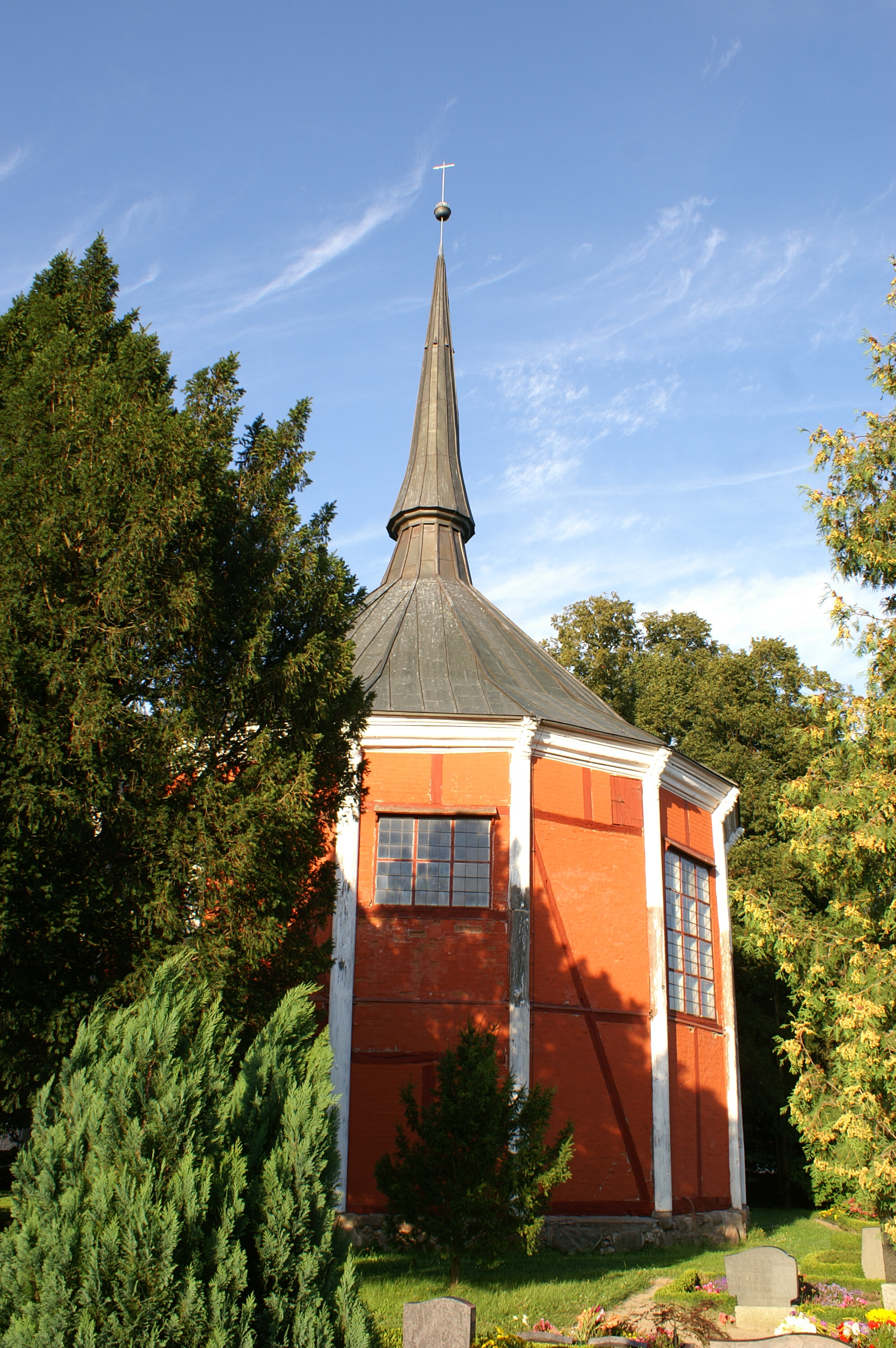
Chapel in Griebenow
