= Kenz-Küstrow =

- Municipality
- Location of Kenz-Küstrow within Vorpommern-Rügen district
- Interactive map of Kenz-Küstrow
- Location within Germany Location within Mecklenburg-Vorpommern
- Coordinates: 54°20′N 12°46′E
- Country: Germany
- State: Mecklenburg-Vorpommern
- District: Vorpommern-Rügen
- Municipal assoc.: Barth

Government
  - Mayor: Richard Bröker-Schmidt

Area
  - Total: 17.23 km^{2} (6.65 sq mi)
- Elevation: 19 m (62 ft)

Population (2025-12-31)
  - Total: 514
  - Density: 29.8/km^{2} (77.3/sq mi)
- Time zone: UTC+01:00 (CET)
  - Summer (DST): UTC+02:00 (CEST)
- Postal codes: 18314
- Dialling codes: 038231
- Vehicle registration: NVP
- Website: www.amt-barth.de

Kenz-Küstrow is a municipality in the Vorpommern-Rügen district, in Mecklenburg-Vorpommern, Germany.

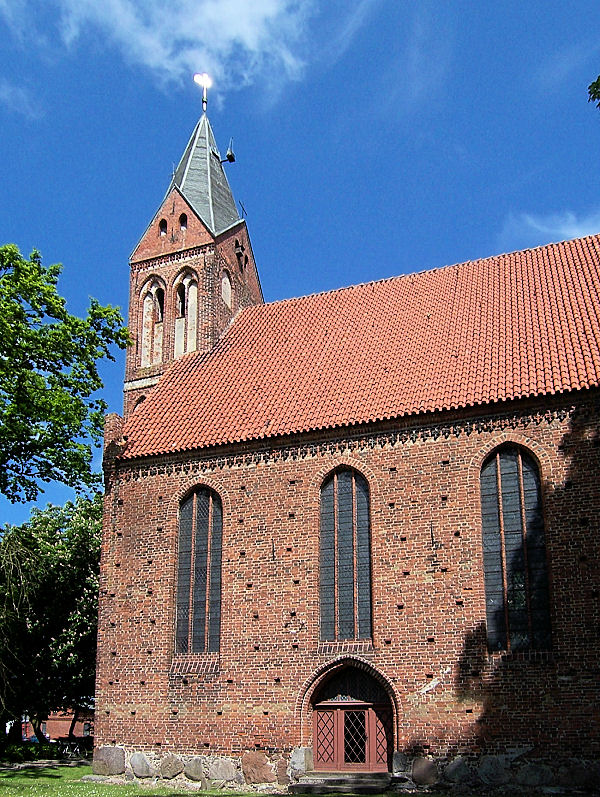
Kenz church

During the Middle Ages, Kenz was an important destination of pilgrimages. Barnim VI is buried in Kenz.
