= Preetz, Mecklenburg-Vorpommern =

Preetz
- Municipality
- Location of Preetz within Vorpommern-Rügen district
- Interactive map of Preetz
- Location within Germany Location within Mecklenburg-Vorpommern
- Coordinates: 54°24′N 12°58′E
- Country: Germany
- State: Mecklenburg-Vorpommern
- District: Vorpommern-Rügen
- Municipal assoc.: Altenpleen

Government
  - Mayor: Menhard Feldmann

Area
  - Total: 14.23 km^{2} (5.49 sq mi)
- Elevation: 8 m (26 ft)

Population (2025-12-31)
  - Total: 1,099
  - Density: 77.23/km^{2} (200.0/sq mi)
- Time zone: UTC+01:00 (CET)
  - Summer (DST): UTC+02:00 (CEST)
- Postal codes: 18445
- Dialling codes: 038323
- Vehicle registration: NVP
- Website: www.altenpleen.de

Preetz (German pronunciation: [ˈpʁeːts]) is a municipality in the Vorpommern-Rügen district, in Mecklenburg-Vorpommern, Germany.
