= Altenpleen =

- Municipality
- Location of Altenpleen within Vorpommern-Rügen district
- Interactive map of Altenpleen
- Location within Germany Location within Mecklenburg-Vorpommern
- Coordinates: 54°21′24″N 12°56′31″E
- Country: Germany
- State: Mecklenburg-Vorpommern
- District: Vorpommern-Rügen
- Municipal assoc.: Altenpleen

Government
  - Mayor: Rainer Behrndt

Area
  - Total: 20.05 km^{2} (7.74 sq mi)
- Elevation: 3 m (9.8 ft)

Population (2025-12-31)
  - Total: 1,020
  - Density: 50.9/km^{2} (132/sq mi)
- Time zone: UTC+01:00 (CET)
  - Summer (DST): UTC+02:00 (CEST)
- Postal codes: 18445
- Dialling codes: 038323
- Vehicle registration: NVP
- Website: www.altenpleen.de

Altenpleen is a municipality in the Vorpommern-Rügen district, in Mecklenburg-Vorpommern, Germany.
