= Groß Kordshagen =

- Municipality
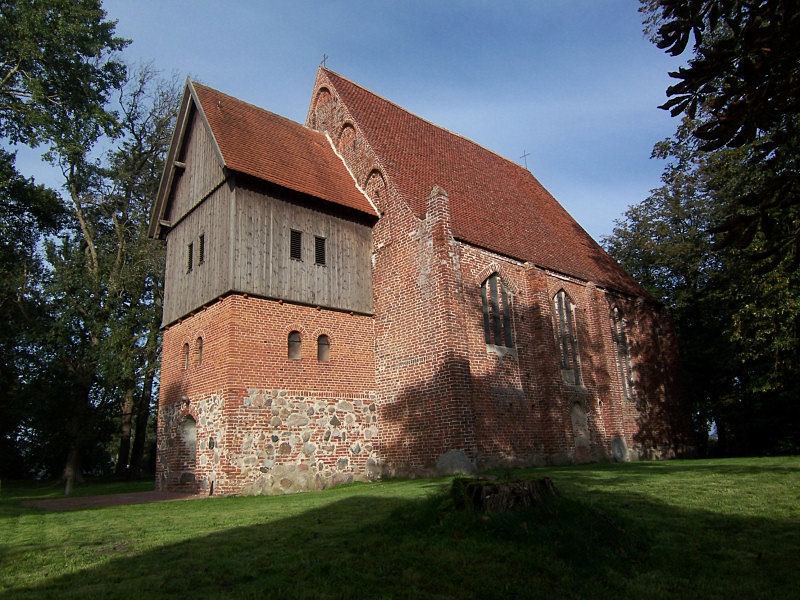
- Marienkirche

- Location of Groß Kordshagen within Vorpommern-Rügen district
- Interactive map of Groß Kordshagen
- Location within Germany Location within Mecklenburg-Vorpommern
- Coordinates: 54°20′N 12°51′E
- Country: Germany
- State: Mecklenburg-Vorpommern
- District: Vorpommern-Rügen
- Municipal assoc.: Niepars

Government
  - Mayor: Jörg Zimmermann

Area
  - Total: 16.09 km^{2} (6.21 sq mi)
- Elevation: 5 m (16 ft)

Population (2025-12-31)
  - Total: 277
  - Density: 17.2/km^{2} (44.6/sq mi)
- Time zone: UTC+01:00 (CET)
  - Summer (DST): UTC+02:00 (CEST)
- Postal codes: 18442
- Dialling codes: 038231
- Vehicle registration: NVP
- Website: www.amt-niepars.de

Groß Kordshagen is a municipality in the Vorpommern-Rügen district, in Mecklenburg-Vorpommern, Germany.

== Geography ==
Groß Kordshagen is between the cities Barth (distance: 8 km) and Stralsund (distance: 18 km) The municipality includes the villages Groß Kordshagen, Arbshagen and Flemendorf.

== Sightseeing ==
- Church "Marienkirche" in Flemendorf
- Manor House Groß Kordshagen
- Manor House Arbshagen

== Economy ==
There are two types of business in Groß Kordshagen: tourism (apartments, campsite, restaurant and a cafe) and agriculture
