= Trinwillershagen =

- Municipality
- Coat of arms

- Location of Trinwillershagen within Vorpommern-Rügen district
- Interactive map of Trinwillershagen
- Location within Germany Location within Mecklenburg-Vorpommern
- Coordinates: 54°15′N 12°38′E
- Country: Germany
- State: Mecklenburg-Vorpommern
- District: Vorpommern-Rügen
- Municipal assoc.: Barth

Government
  - Mayor: Klaus-Dieter Tahn

Area
  - Total: 34.21 km^{2} (13.21 sq mi)
- Elevation: 18 m (59 ft)

Population (2025-12-31)
  - Total: 1,162
  - Density: 33.97/km^{2} (87.97/sq mi)
- Time zone: UTC+01:00 (CET)
  - Summer (DST): UTC+02:00 (CEST)
- Postal codes: 18320
- Dialling codes: 038225
- Vehicle registration: NVP
- Website: www.trinwillershagen.de

Trinwillershagen (German pronunciation: [ˈtʀiːnʋɪlɐsˌhaːgən]) is a municipality in the north of Mecklenburg-Vorpommern, Germany. It is situated in the Vorpommern-Rügen district. Trinwillershagen used to be part of the Amt Ahrenshagen, since 1 January 2005 it is part of Amt Barth.

== Geography ==
Trinwillershagen is situated between Stralsund (to the East) and Ribnitz-Damgarten (about 10 km to the West). On an area of 34,21 km² there are 1,176 inhabitants (December 2024).

== History ==
Trinwillershagen was founded in the 14th century during the German Ostsiedlung (colonisation of the East). Its name is derived from the Old High German "Tründel", the name for the round shaped type of settlement that is called Rundling. Maps dating from 1583 show the round or circular shape of the village with small ponds in its middle.

The village was first mentioned in 1320 in the Pommersches Urkundenbuch 5 (Pomeranian Book of Deeds Nr. 5). During the Thirty Years' War peasants and serfs suffered substantial damage from Albrecht von Wallenstein's troops. From the second half of the 18th century onwards Trinwillershagen was part of a knight's country estate, whose owner changed rather often over the years. The last owner Matthies had the estate farmed until the 1945 land reform was imposed by the Soviets. His farmers were dwelling in the houses along the only road (Altes Dorf).

During World War II, some new houses were built to accommodate people from Stralsund, whose houses had been bombed.

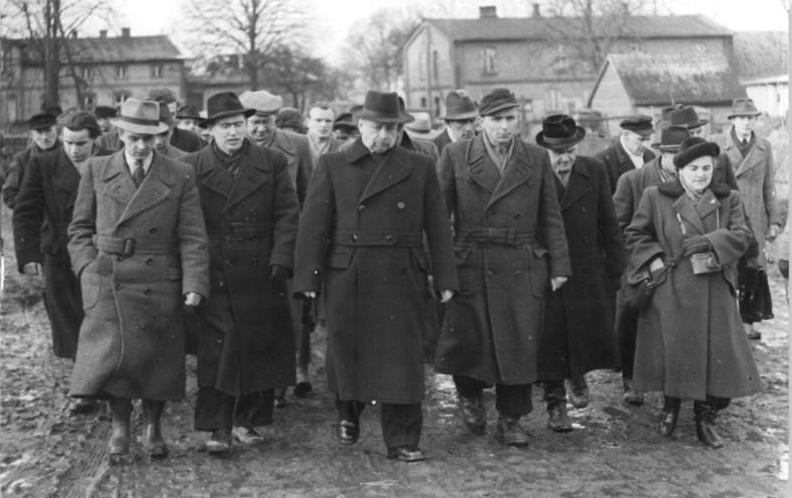
Walter Ulbricht visiting a collective farm in Trinwillershagen in January 1953.

After the GDR had been founded and following the land reform, the Landwirtschaftliche Produktionsgenossenschaft (LPG) Trinwillershagen "Rotes Banner" was founded, which was dismantled only after the German reunification in 1991. During the 1990s some new family homes have been built and old houses have undergone diligent restoration work. Much of the former LPG area has been turned into meadows and park land.

== Economy ==
In Trinwillershagen there are some minor contractor's companies, farmers and one restaurant. There is also a bank, a shopping centre a dentist and a general practitioner. An industrial estate and a recently built wind farm add to Trinwillershagen's modest economical improvement.

Most inhabitants are commuting to Ribnitz-Damgarten, Barth, Stralsund or Rostock. Many people are unemployed, however, as there is a general lack of jobs in the area.

=== Transport ===
The village is located near Bundesstrasse 105.

== Education, culture and sports ==
The village has its own primary school, which is soon to be closed, however, and a kindergarten. Cultural institutions are the regular dance and music events in the former Kulturhaus, the family meeting of the Methodist church and a skittle alley. Annual village festivals add to the village's entertainment. The local soccer club "Rot-Weiss" is looking back on a long tradition.

== Trivia ==
Walter Ulbricht and Anastas Mikoyan, member of the Soviet Politburo, visited the LPG and the village in 1957 in order to see the "modern socialist" farming industry that had been installed there. On 13 July 2006 George W. Bush, President of the United States, visited Trinwillershagen during a state visit, as Trinwillershagen is located in Chancellor Angela Merkel's home district.

== Literature ==
- Siegfried Kell: Chronik Trinwillershagen, Trinwillershagen.
