= Löbnitz, Mecklenburg-Vorpommern =

Löbnitz
- Municipality
- Coat of arms

- Location of Löbnitz within Vorpommern-Rügen district
- Interactive map of Löbnitz
- Location within Germany Location within Mecklenburg-Vorpommern
- Coordinates: 54°18′N 12°43′E
- Country: Germany
- State: Mecklenburg-Vorpommern
- District: Vorpommern-Rügen
- Municipal assoc.: Barth

Government
  - Mayor: Lothar Seib

Area
  - Total: 22.22 km^{2} (8.58 sq mi)
- Elevation: 4 m (13 ft)

Population (2025-12-31)
  - Total: 600
  - Density: 27/km^{2} (70/sq mi)
- Time zone: UTC+01:00 (CET)
  - Summer (DST): UTC+02:00 (CEST)
- Postal codes: 18465
- Dialling codes: 038324
- Vehicle registration: NVP
- Website: www.amt-barth.de

Löbnitz is a municipality in the Vorpommern-Rügen district, in Mecklenburg-Vorpommern, Germany.
