= Zingst, Germany =

Zingst
- Municipality
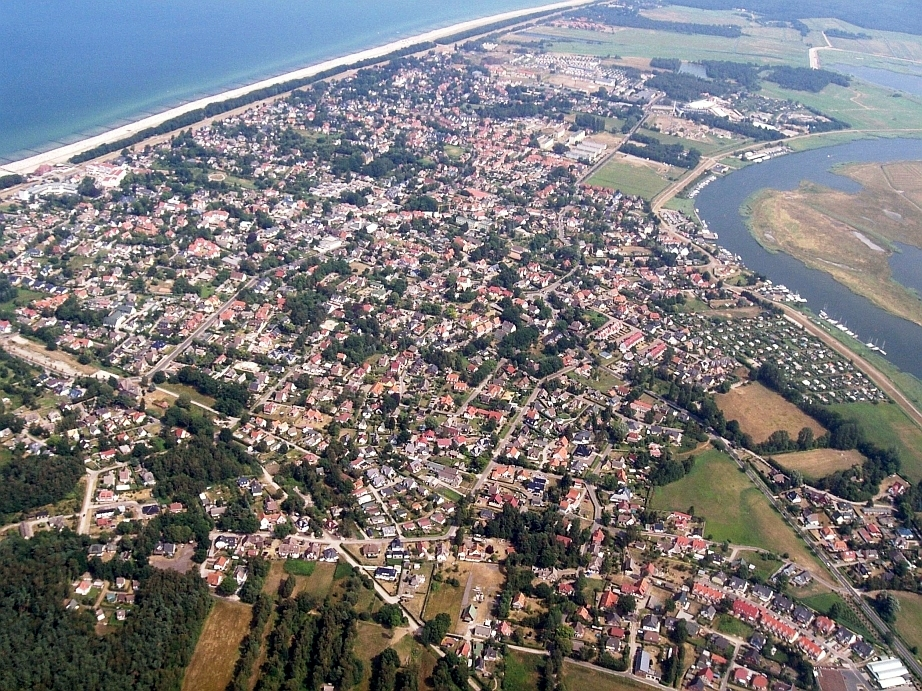
- Aerial view of Zingst

- Coat of arms

- Location of Zingst within Vorpommern-Rügen district
- Interactive map of Zingst
- Location within Germany Location within Mecklenburg-Vorpommern
- Coordinates: 54°26′20″N 12°41′20″E
- Country: Germany
- State: Mecklenburg-Vorpommern
- District: Vorpommern-Rügen

Government
  - Mayor: Christian Zornow

Area
  - Total: 50.5 km^{2} (19.5 sq mi)
- Elevation: 2 m (6.6 ft)

Population (2025-12-31)
  - Total: 2,867
  - Density: 56.8/km^{2} (147/sq mi)
- Time zone: UTC+01:00 (CET)
  - Summer (DST): UTC+02:00 (CEST)
- Postal codes: 18374
- Dialling codes: 038232
- Vehicle registration: NVP
- Website: www.zingst.de

Zingst (German pronunciation: [ˈtsɪŋst]) is a municipality in the Vorpommern-Rügen district, in Mecklenburg-Vorpommern, Germany. It is located on the peninsula of Zingst.

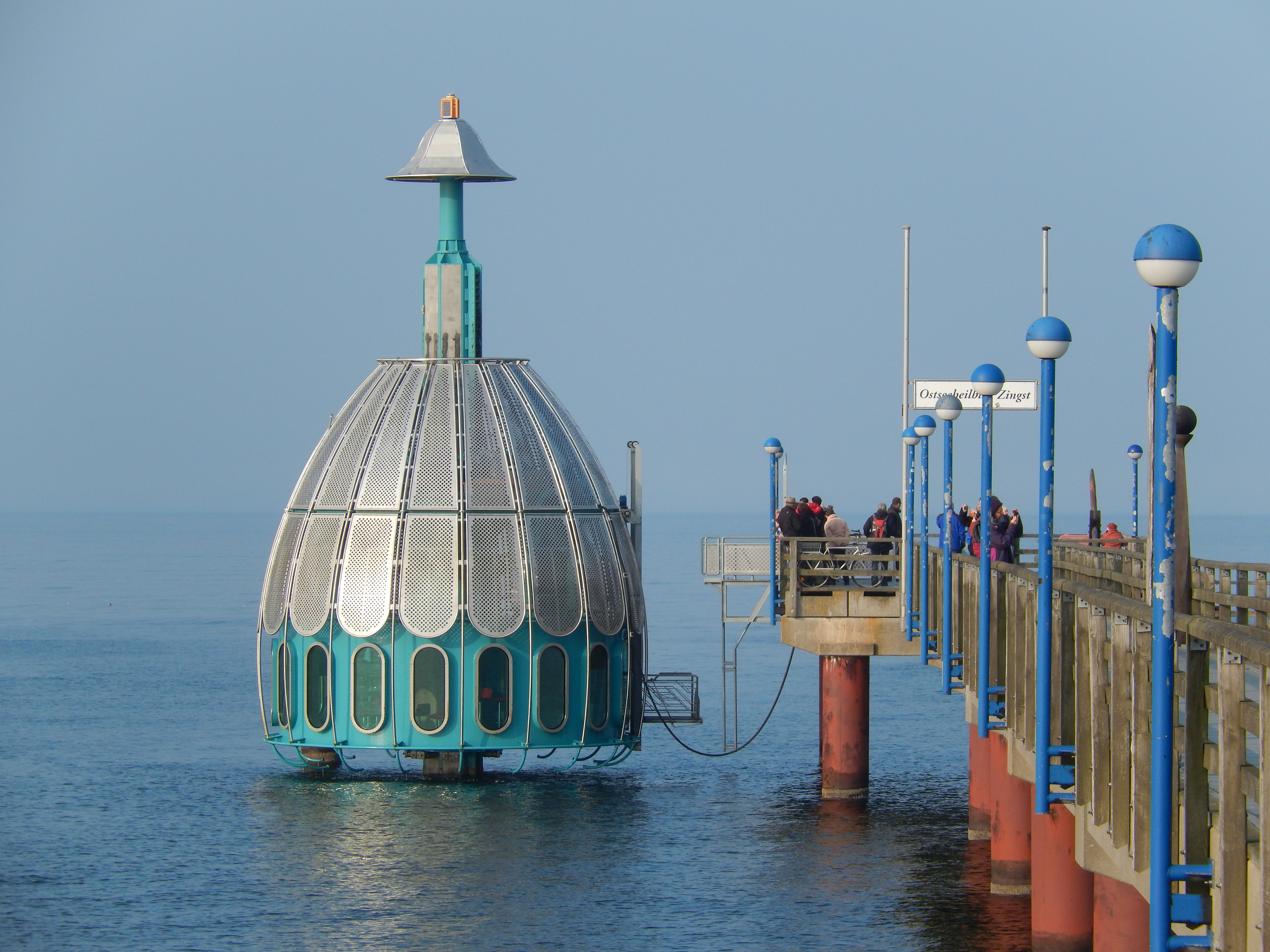
Submarining dive gondola at a pier in Zingst
