= Ribnitz-Damgarten (Amt) =

- Amt
- Location of Ribnitz-Damgarten within Vorpommern-Rügen district
- Interactive map of Ribnitz-Damgarten
- Location within Germany Location within Mecklenburg-Vorpommern
- Coordinates: 54°14′N 12°36′E
- Country: Germany
- State: Mecklenburg-Vorpommern
- District: Vorpommern-Rügen
- Seat: Ribnitz-Damgarten
- Subdivisions: 4 municipalities

Area
  - Total: 237.59 km^{2} (91.73 sq mi)

Population (2025-12-31)
  - Total: 18,329
  - Density: 77.146/km^{2} (199.81/sq mi)
- Time zone: UTC+01:00 (CET)
  - Summer (DST): UTC+02:00 (CEST)
- Website: www.ribnitz-damgarten.de

Ribnitz-Damgarten is an Amt in the district of Vorpommern-Rügen, in Mecklenburg-Vorpommern, Germany. It was established in 2005. The seat of the Amt is in Ribnitz-Damgarten.

The Amt Ribnitz-Damgarten consists of the following municipalities:

- Ahrenshagen-Daskow
- Ribnitz-Damgarten
- Schlemmin
- Semlow
