= Miltzow (Amt) =

- Amt
- Location of Miltzow within Vorpommern-Rügen district
- Interactive map of Miltzow
- Location within Germany Location within Mecklenburg-Vorpommern
- Coordinates: 54°13′N 13°08′E
- Country: Germany
- State: Mecklenburg-Vorpommern
- District: Vorpommern-Rügen
- Seat: Miltzow
- Subdivisions: 3 municipalities

Area
  - Total: 229.31 km^{2} (88.54 sq mi)

Population (2025-12-31)
  - Total: 6,919
  - Density: 30.17/km^{2} (78.15/sq mi)
- Time zone: UTC+01:00 (CET)
  - Summer (DST): UTC+02:00 (CEST)
- Website: www.amt-miltzow.de

Miltzow is an Amt in the district of Vorpommern-Rügen, in Mecklenburg-Vorpommern, Germany. The seat of the Amt is in Miltzow, a village in the municipality Sundhagen.

The Amt Miltzow consists of the following municipalities:

1. Elmenhorst
2. Sundhagen
3. Wittenhagen
