= Hugoldsdorf =

- Municipality
- Location of Hugoldsdorf within Vorpommern-Rügen district
- Interactive map of Hugoldsdorf
- Location within Germany Location within Mecklenburg-Vorpommern
- Coordinates: 54°09′N 12°45′E
- Country: Germany
- State: Mecklenburg-Vorpommern
- District: Vorpommern-Rügen
- Municipal assoc.: Recknitz-Trebeltal

Government
  - Mayor: Peter Richter

Area
  - Total: 14.17 km^{2} (5.47 sq mi)
- Elevation: 14 m (46 ft)

Population (2025-12-31)
  - Total: 121
  - Density: 8.54/km^{2} (22.1/sq mi)
- Time zone: UTC+01:00 (CET)
  - Summer (DST): UTC+02:00 (CEST)
- Postal codes: 18465
- Dialling codes: 038320
- Vehicle registration: NVP
- Website: www.recknitz-trebeltal.de

Hugoldsdorf is a municipality in the Vorpommern-Rügen district, in Mecklenburg-Vorpommern, Germany.
