= Weitenhagen, Nordvorpommern =

Weitenhagen
- Municipality
- Location of Weitenhagen within Vorpommern-Rügen district
- Interactive map of Weitenhagen
- Location within Germany Location within Mecklenburg-Vorpommern
- Coordinates: 54°14′N 12°47′E
- Country: Germany
- State: Mecklenburg-Vorpommern
- District: Vorpommern-Rügen
- Municipal assoc.: Franzburg-Richtenberg

Government
  - Mayor: Hartmut Thurow

Area
  - Total: 17.03 km^{2} (6.58 sq mi)
- Elevation: 19 m (62 ft)

Population (2025-12-31)
  - Total: 219
  - Density: 12.9/km^{2} (33.3/sq mi)
- Time zone: UTC+01:00 (CET)
  - Summer (DST): UTC+02:00 (CEST)
- Postal codes: 18469
- Dialling codes: 038322
- Vehicle registration: NVP
- Website: www.amt-franzburg-richtenberg.de

Weitenhagen is a municipality in the Vorpommern-Rügen district, in Mecklenburg-Vorpommern, Germany.
