= Millienhagen-Oebelitz =

- Municipality
- Location of Millienhagen-Oebelitz within Vorpommern-Rügen district
- Interactive map of Millienhagen-Oebelitz
- Location within Germany Location within Mecklenburg-Vorpommern
- Coordinates: 54°11′N 12°49′E
- Country: Germany
- State: Mecklenburg-Vorpommern
- District: Vorpommern-Rügen
- Municipal assoc.: Franzburg-Richtenberg

Government
  - Mayor: Ulrich Dettmann

Area
  - Total: 25.49 km^{2} (9.84 sq mi)
- Elevation: 19 m (62 ft)

Population (2025-12-31)
  - Total: 302
  - Density: 11.8/km^{2} (30.7/sq mi)
- Time zone: UTC+01:00 (CET)
  - Summer (DST): UTC+02:00 (CEST)
- Postal codes: 18461
- Dialling codes: 038322
- Vehicle registration: NVP
- Website: www.amt-franzburg-richtenberg.de

Millienhagen-Oebelitz is a municipality in the Vorpommern-Rügen district, in Mecklenburg-Vorpommern, Germany.
