= Zarrendorf =

- Municipality
- Location of Zarrendorf within Vorpommern-Rügen district
- Interactive map of Zarrendorf
- Location within Germany Location within Mecklenburg-Vorpommern
- Coordinates: 54°14′N 13°05′E
- Country: Germany
- State: Mecklenburg-Vorpommern
- District: Vorpommern-Rügen
- Municipal assoc.: Niepars

Government
  - Mayor: Ulrike Graap

Area
  - Total: 4.64 km^{2} (1.79 sq mi)
- Elevation: 7 m (23 ft)

Population (2025-12-31)
  - Total: 1,106
  - Density: 238/km^{2} (617/sq mi)
- Time zone: UTC+01:00 (CET)
  - Summer (DST): UTC+02:00 (CEST)
- Postal codes: 18510
- Dialling codes: 038327
- Vehicle registration: NVP
- Website: www.zarrendorf.de

Zarrendorf is a municipality in the Vorpommern-Rügen district, in Mecklenburg-Vorpommern, Germany.
