= Lindholz =

- Municipality
- Location of Lindholz within Vorpommern-Rügen district
- Interactive map of Lindholz
- Location within Germany Location within Mecklenburg-Vorpommern
- Coordinates: 54°03′N 12°42′E
- Country: Germany
- State: Mecklenburg-Vorpommern
- District: Vorpommern-Rügen
- Municipal assoc.: Recknitz-Trebeltal

Government
  - Mayor: Hartmut Kolschewski

Area
  - Total: 39.91 km^{2} (15.41 sq mi)
- Elevation: 14 m (46 ft)

Population (2025-12-31)
  - Total: 590
  - Density: 15/km^{2} (38/sq mi)
- Time zone: UTC+01:00 (CET)
  - Summer (DST): UTC+02:00 (CEST)
- Postal codes: 18334
- Dialling codes: 038320, 038329
- Vehicle registration: NVP
- Website: www.recknitz-trebeltal.de

Lindholz is a municipality in the Vorpommern-Rügen district, in Mecklenburg-Vorpommern, Germany.
