= Pantelitz =

- Municipality
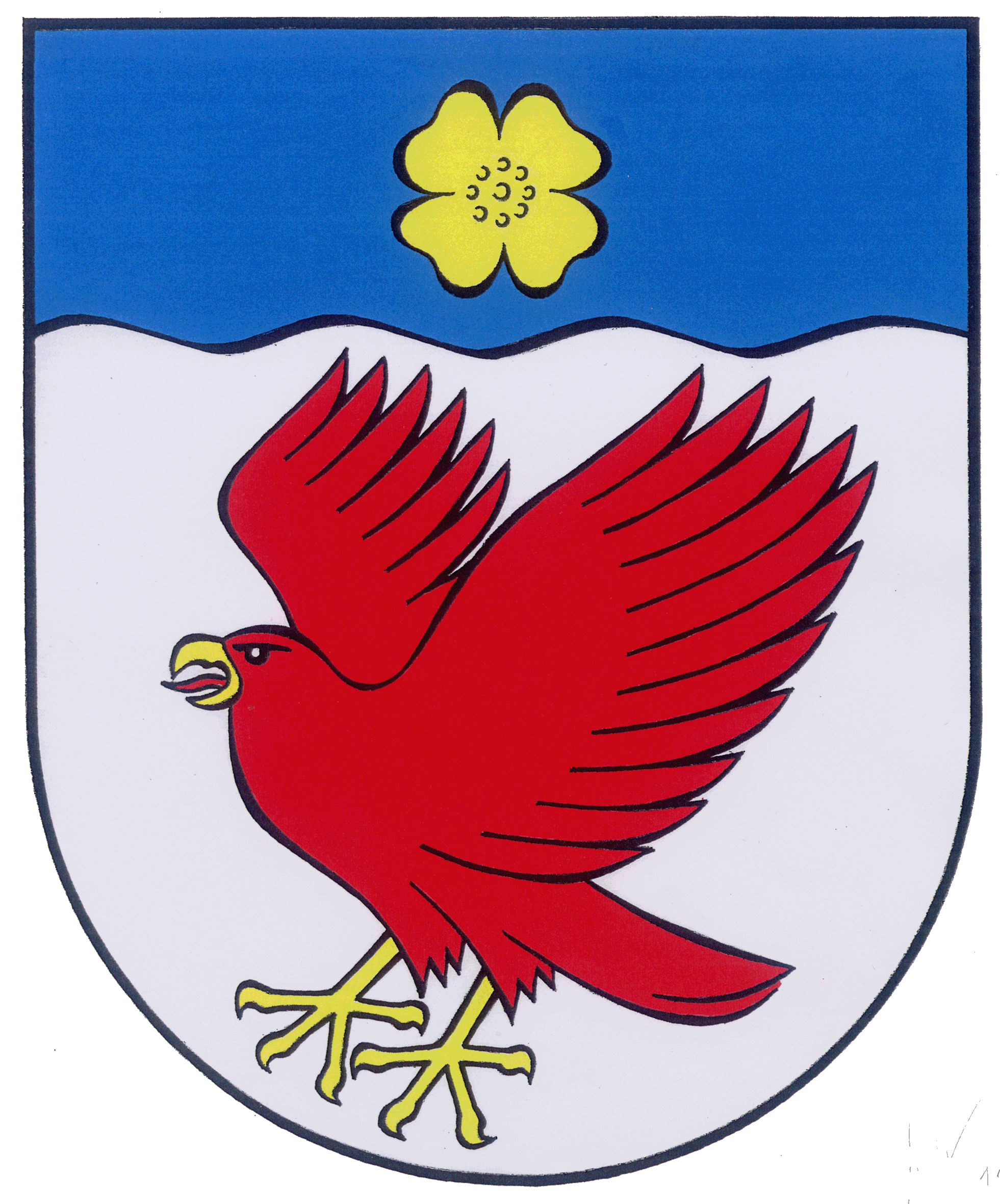
- Coat of arms

- Location of Pantelitz within Vorpommern-Rügen district
- Interactive map of Pantelitz
- Location within Germany Location within Mecklenburg-Vorpommern
- Coordinates: 54°18′N 12°58′E
- Country: Germany
- State: Mecklenburg-Vorpommern
- District: Vorpommern-Rügen
- Municipal assoc.: Niepars

Government
  - Mayor: Günter Wenzel

Area
  - Total: 14.41 km^{2} (5.56 sq mi)
- Elevation: 20 m (66 ft)

Population (2025-12-31)
  - Total: 884
  - Density: 61.3/km^{2} (159/sq mi)
- Time zone: UTC+01:00 (CET)
  - Summer (DST): UTC+02:00 (CEST)
- Postal codes: 18442
- Dialling codes: 03831
- Vehicle registration: NVP
- Website: www. niepars.de

Pantelitz is a municipality in the Vorpommern-Rügen district, in Mecklenburg-Vorpommern, Germany.
