= Groß Mohrdorf =

- Municipality
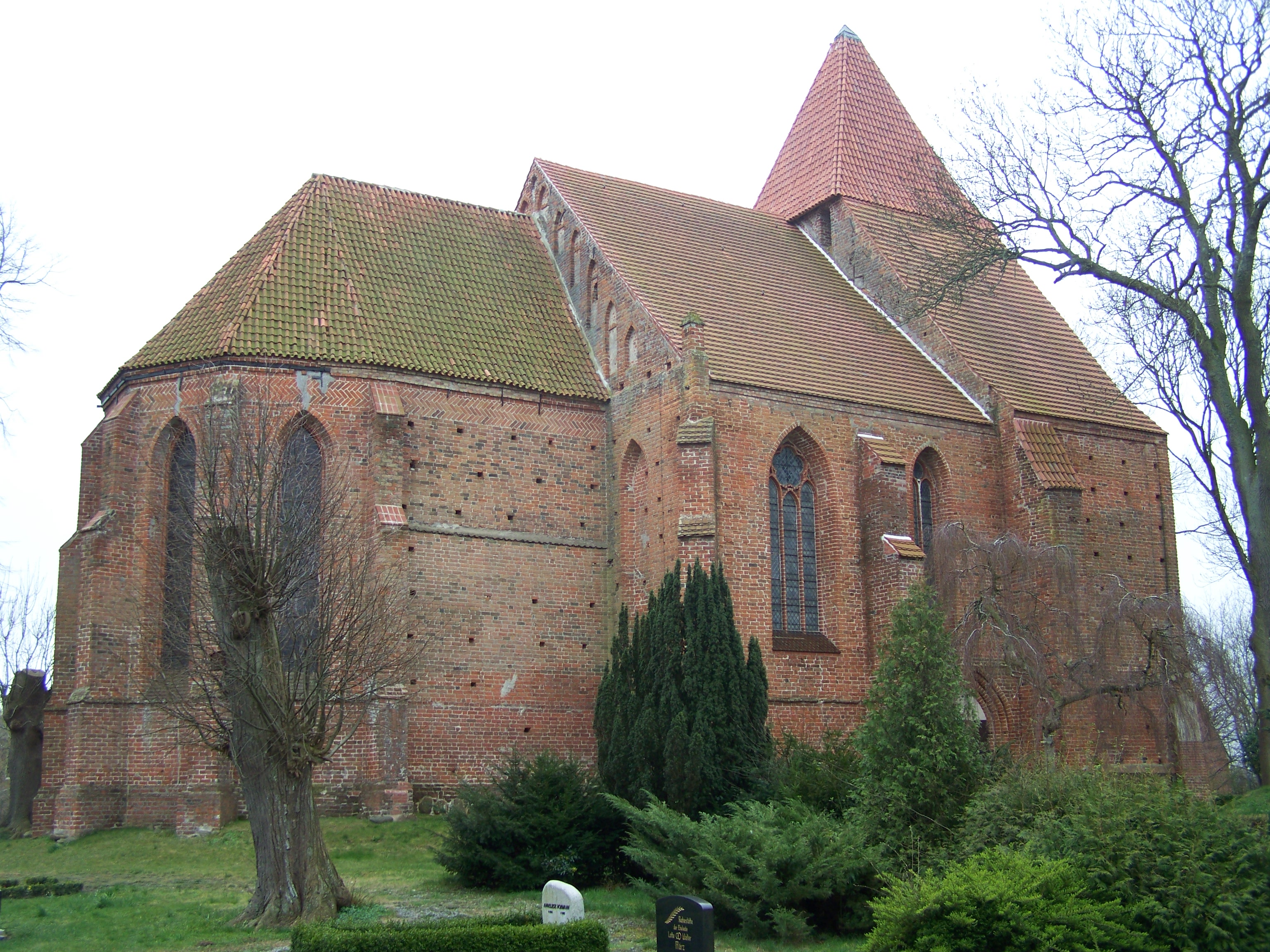
- Church

- Location of Groß Mohrdorf within Vorpommern-Rügen district
- Interactive map of Groß Mohrdorf
- Location within Germany Location within Mecklenburg-Vorpommern
- Coordinates: 54°23′N 12°57′E
- Country: Germany
- State: Mecklenburg-Vorpommern
- District: Vorpommern-Rügen
- Municipal assoc.: Altenpleen

Government
  - Mayor: Bernd Kopmann

Area
  - Total: 41.56 km^{2} (16.05 sq mi)
- Elevation: 4 m (13 ft)

Population (2025-12-31)
  - Total: 765
  - Density: 18.4/km^{2} (47.7/sq mi)
- Time zone: UTC+01:00 (CET)
  - Summer (DST): UTC+02:00 (CEST)
- Postal codes: 18445
- Dialling codes: 038323
- Vehicle registration: NVP
- Website: www.altenpleen.de

Groß Mohrdorf is a municipality in the Vorpommern-Rügen district, in Mecklenburg-Vorpommern, Germany.

Schloss Hohendorf is located in Groß Mohrdorf municipality.
