= Karnin =

- Municipality
- Location of Karnin within Vorpommern-Rügen district
- Interactive map of Karnin
- Location within Germany Location within Mecklenburg-Vorpommern
- Coordinates: 54°18′N 12°48′E
- Country: Germany
- State: Mecklenburg-Vorpommern
- District: Vorpommern-Rügen
- Municipal assoc.: Barth

Government
  - Mayor: Diana Billey

Area
  - Total: 12.42 km^{2} (4.80 sq mi)
- Elevation: 5 m (16 ft)

Population (2025-12-31)
  - Total: 242
  - Density: 19.5/km^{2} (50.5/sq mi)
- Time zone: UTC+01:00 (CET)
  - Summer (DST): UTC+02:00 (CEST)
- Postal codes: 18469
- Dialling codes: 038324
- Vehicle registration: NVP
- Website: www.amt-barth.de

Karnin is a municipality in the Vorpommern-Rügen district, in Mecklenburg-Vorpommern, Germany.
