= Pruchten =

- Municipality
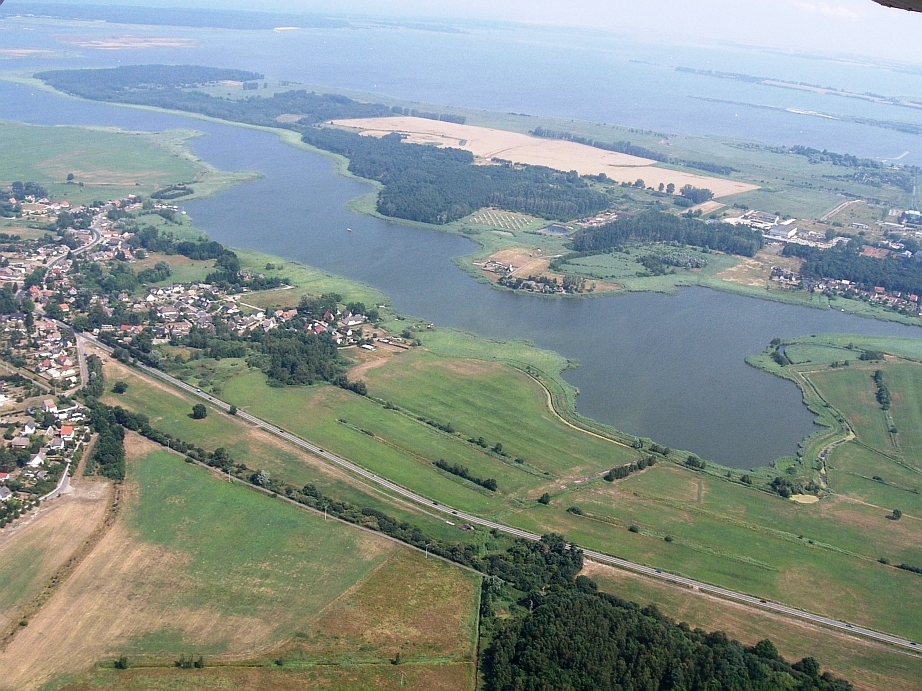
- Aerial view of Pruchten

- Location of Pruchten within Vorpommern-Rügen district
- Interactive map of Pruchten
- Location within Germany Location within Mecklenburg-Vorpommern
- Coordinates: 54°23′N 12°40′E
- Country: Germany
- State: Mecklenburg-Vorpommern
- District: Vorpommern-Rügen
- Municipal assoc.: Barth

Government
  - Mayor: Andreas Wieneke

Area
  - Total: 8.16 km^{2} (3.15 sq mi)
- Elevation: 0.5 m (1.6 ft)

Population (2025-12-31)
  - Total: 726
  - Density: 89.0/km^{2} (230/sq mi)
- Time zone: UTC+01:00 (CET)
  - Summer (DST): UTC+02:00 (CEST)
- Postal codes: 18356
- Dialling codes: 038231
- Vehicle registration: NVP
- Website: www.amt-barth.de

Pruchten is a municipality in the Vorpommern-Rügen district, in Mecklenburg-Vorpommern, Germany.
