= Deyelsdorf =

- Municipality
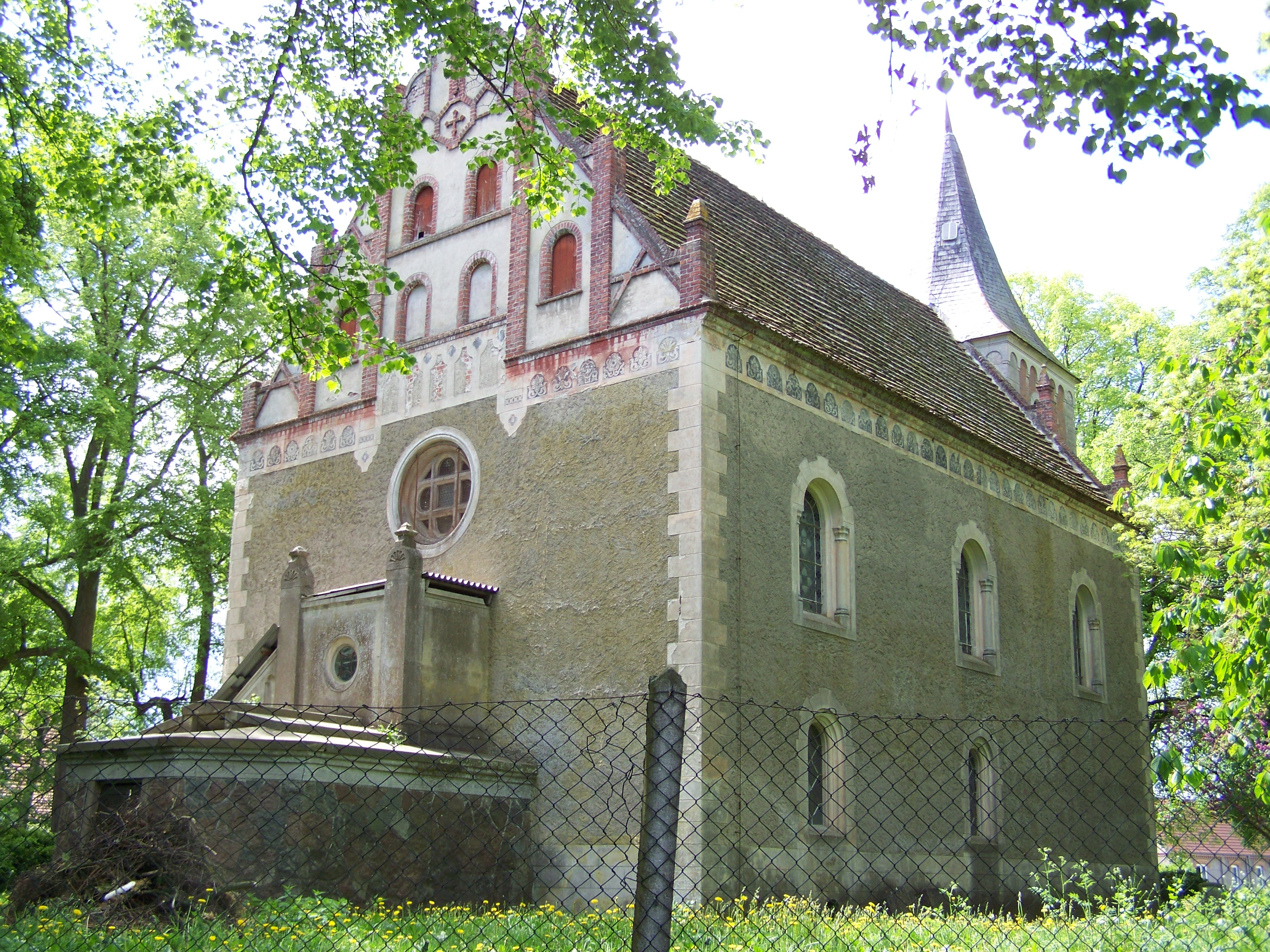
- Deyelsdorf Church

- Location of Deyelsdorf within Vorpommern-Rügen district
- Interactive map of Deyelsdorf
- Location within Germany Location within Mecklenburg-Vorpommern
- Coordinates: 54°03′N 12°50′E
- Country: Germany
- State: Mecklenburg-Vorpommern
- District: Vorpommern-Rügen
- Municipal assoc.: Recknitz-Trebeltal

Government
  - Mayor: Marita Klatt

Area
  - Total: 29.78 km^{2} (11.50 sq mi)
- Elevation: 19 m (62 ft)

Population (2025-12-31)
  - Total: 454
  - Density: 15.2/km^{2} (39.5/sq mi)
- Time zone: UTC+01:00 (CET)
  - Summer (DST): UTC+02:00 (CEST)
- Postal codes: 18513
- Dialling codes: 038334
- Vehicle registration: NVP
- Website: www.recknitz-trebeltal.de

Deyelsdorf is a municipality in the Vorpommern-Rügen district, in Mecklenburg-Vorpommern, Germany.
