= Lüdershagen =

- Municipality
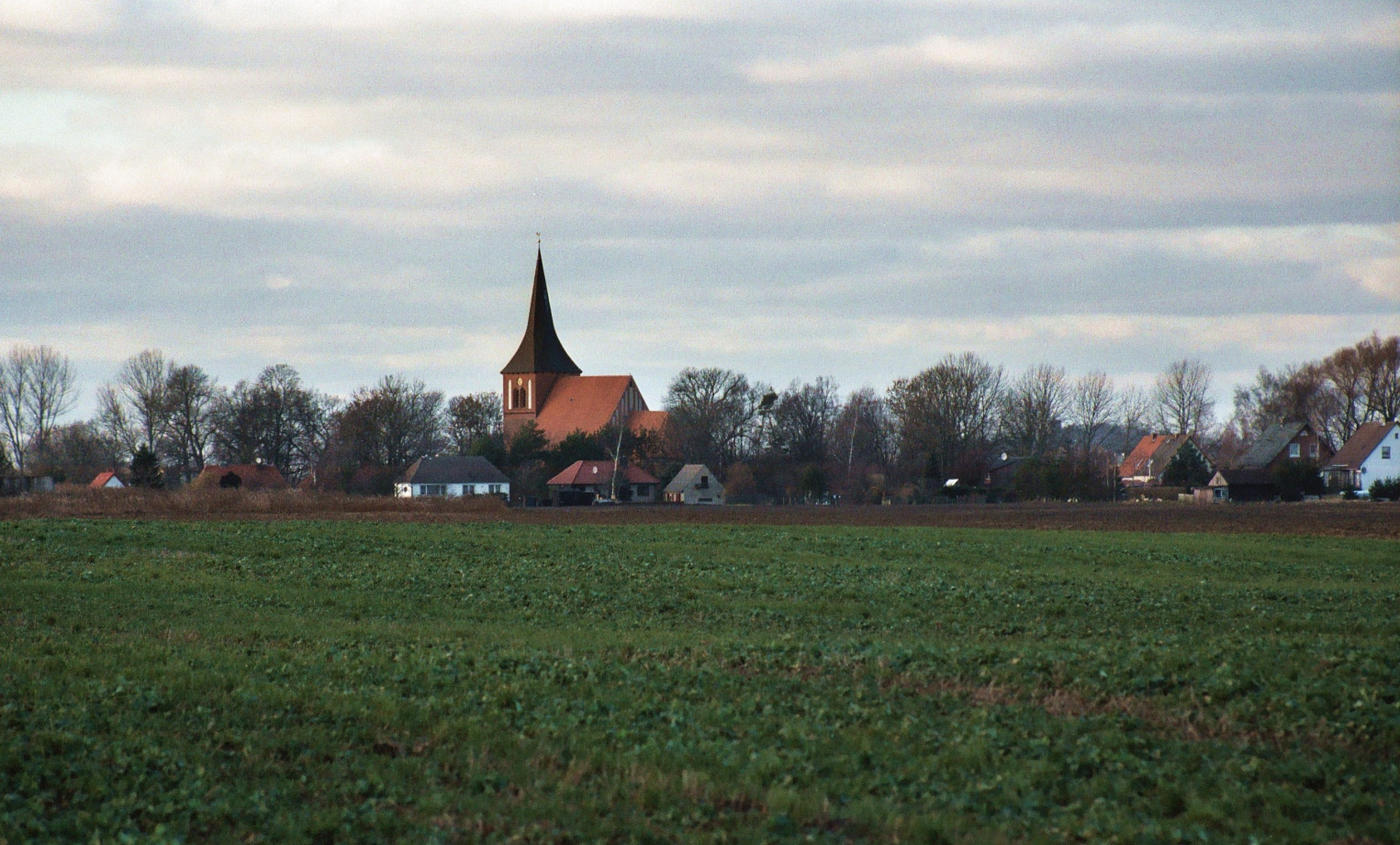
- View of Lüdershagen

- Location of Lüdershagen within Vorpommern-Rügen district
- Interactive map of Lüdershagen
- Location within Germany Location within Mecklenburg-Vorpommern
- Coordinates: 54°18′N 12°37′E
- Country: Germany
- State: Mecklenburg-Vorpommern
- District: Vorpommern-Rügen
- Municipal assoc.: Barth

Government
  - Mayor: Gerhild Balzer

Area
  - Total: 13.94 km^{2} (5.38 sq mi)
- Elevation: 17 m (56 ft)

Population (2025-12-31)
  - Total: 555
  - Density: 39.8/km^{2} (103/sq mi)
- Time zone: UTC+01:00 (CET)
  - Summer (DST): UTC+02:00 (CEST)
- Postal codes: 18314
- Dialling codes: 038227
- Vehicle registration: NVP
- Website: www.amt-barth.de

Lüdershagen is a Baltic Sea municipality in the Vorpommern-Rügen district (Northwest Pomerania), in Mecklenburg-Vorpommern, Germany. Located about 18 km southwest of Barth and (until 2005) part of Amt Barth, Lüdershagen is about 15 km east of Ribnitz-Damgarten. To the north of the town is Gäthkenhäger forest, and to the south is Highway 105 (Rostock-Stralsund). The population of Lüdershagen is about 580.

The name Lüdershagen was first recorded in 1278 in the wake of the Ostsiedlung, the resettlement of Germans into Central and Eastern Europe associated with the expansion of the Holy Roman Empire, the defeat of Denmark at the Battle of Bornhöved (1227) and the conquest of the Old Prussians by the Teutonic Order.

The town is known for Georgskirche (St. George's Church), a brick building in the Gothic style dating to the 13th and 14th centuries and maintained by the Pomeranian Evangelical Church. There is also an annual summer festival known as Tonnenabschlagen.
