= Grammendorf =

- Municipality
- Location of Grammendorf within Vorpommern-Rügen district
- Interactive map of Grammendorf
- Location within Germany Location within Mecklenburg-Vorpommern
- Coordinates: 54°02′N 12°53′E
- Country: Germany
- State: Mecklenburg-Vorpommern
- District: Vorpommern-Rügen
- Municipal assoc.: Recknitz-Trebeltal

Government
  - Mayor: Udo Peters

Area
  - Total: 35.96 km^{2} (13.88 sq mi)
- Elevation: 7 m (23 ft)

Population (2025-12-31)
  - Total: 497
  - Density: 13.8/km^{2} (35.8/sq mi)
- Time zone: UTC+01:00 (CET)
  - Summer (DST): UTC+02:00 (CEST)
- Postal codes: 18513
- Dialling codes: 038334
- Vehicle registration: NVP
- Website: www.recknitz-trebeltal.de

Grammendorf is a municipality in the Vorpommern-Rügen district, in Mecklenburg-Vorpommern, Germany.
