= Recknitz-Trebeltal =

Amt in Mecklenburg-Vorpommern, Germany

- Amt
- Location of Recknitz-Trebeltal within Vorpommern-Rügen district
- Interactive map of Recknitz-Trebeltal
- Location within Germany Location within Mecklenburg-Vorpommern
- Coordinates: 54°06′N 12°45′E
- Country: Germany
- State: Mecklenburg-Vorpommern
- District: Vorpommern-Rügen
- Seat: Tribsees
- Subdivisions: 10 municipalities

Area
  - Total: 341.24 km^{2} (131.75 sq mi)

Population (2025-12-31)
  - Total: 8,172
  - Density: 23.95/km^{2} (62.02/sq mi)
- Time zone: UTC+01:00 (CET)
  - Summer (DST): UTC+02:00 (CEST)
- Website: www.recknitz-trebeltal.de

Recknitz-Trebeltal is an Amt in the district of Vorpommern-Rügen, in Mecklenburg-Vorpommern, Germany. The seat of the Amt is in Tribsees.

The Amt Recknitz-Trebeltal consists of the following municipalities:

1. Bad Sülze
2. Dettmannsdorf
3. Deyelsdorf
4. Drechow
5. Eixen
6. Grammendorf
7. Gransebieth
8. Hugoldsdorf
9. Lindholz
10. Tribsees
