= Klausdorf, Mecklenburg-Vorpommern =

Klausdorf
- Municipality
- Location of Klausdorf within Vorpommern-Rügen district
- Interactive map of Klausdorf
- Location within Germany Location within Mecklenburg-Vorpommern
- Coordinates: 54°24′N 13°01′E
- Country: Germany
- State: Mecklenburg-Vorpommern
- District: Vorpommern-Rügen
- Municipal assoc.: Altenpleen

Government
  - Mayor: Thomas Reichenbach

Area
  - Total: 11.67 km^{2} (4.51 sq mi)
- Elevation: 0.5 m (1.6 ft)

Population (2025-12-31)
  - Total: 684
  - Density: 58.6/km^{2} (152/sq mi)
- Time zone: UTC+01:00 (CET)
  - Summer (DST): UTC+02:00 (CEST)
- Postal codes: 18445
- Dialling codes: 038323
- Vehicle registration: NVP
- Website: klausdorf-vorpommern.de

Klausdorf (German pronunciation: [ˈklaʊsˌdɔʁf]) is a municipality in the Vorpommern-Rügen district, in Mecklenburg-Vorpommern, Germany.
