= Lüssow, Nordvorpommern =

Lüssow
- Municipality
- Location of Lüssow within Vorpommern-Rügen district
- Interactive map of Lüssow
- Location within Germany Location within Mecklenburg-Vorpommern
- Coordinates: 54°17′N 13°02′E
- Country: Germany
- State: Mecklenburg-Vorpommern
- District: Vorpommern-Rügen
- Municipal assoc.: Niepars

Government
  - Mayor: Verena Kuphal

Area
  - Total: 18.86 km^{2} (7.28 sq mi)
- Elevation: 8 m (26 ft)

Population (2025-12-31)
  - Total: 901
  - Density: 47.8/km^{2} (124/sq mi)
- Time zone: UTC+01:00 (CET)
  - Summer (DST): UTC+02:00 (CEST)
- Postal codes: 18442
- Dialling codes: 03831
- Vehicle registration: NVP
- Website: www. niepars.de

Lüssow is a municipality in the Vorpommern-Rügen district, in Mecklenburg-Vorpommern, Germany.
