= Eixen =

- Municipality
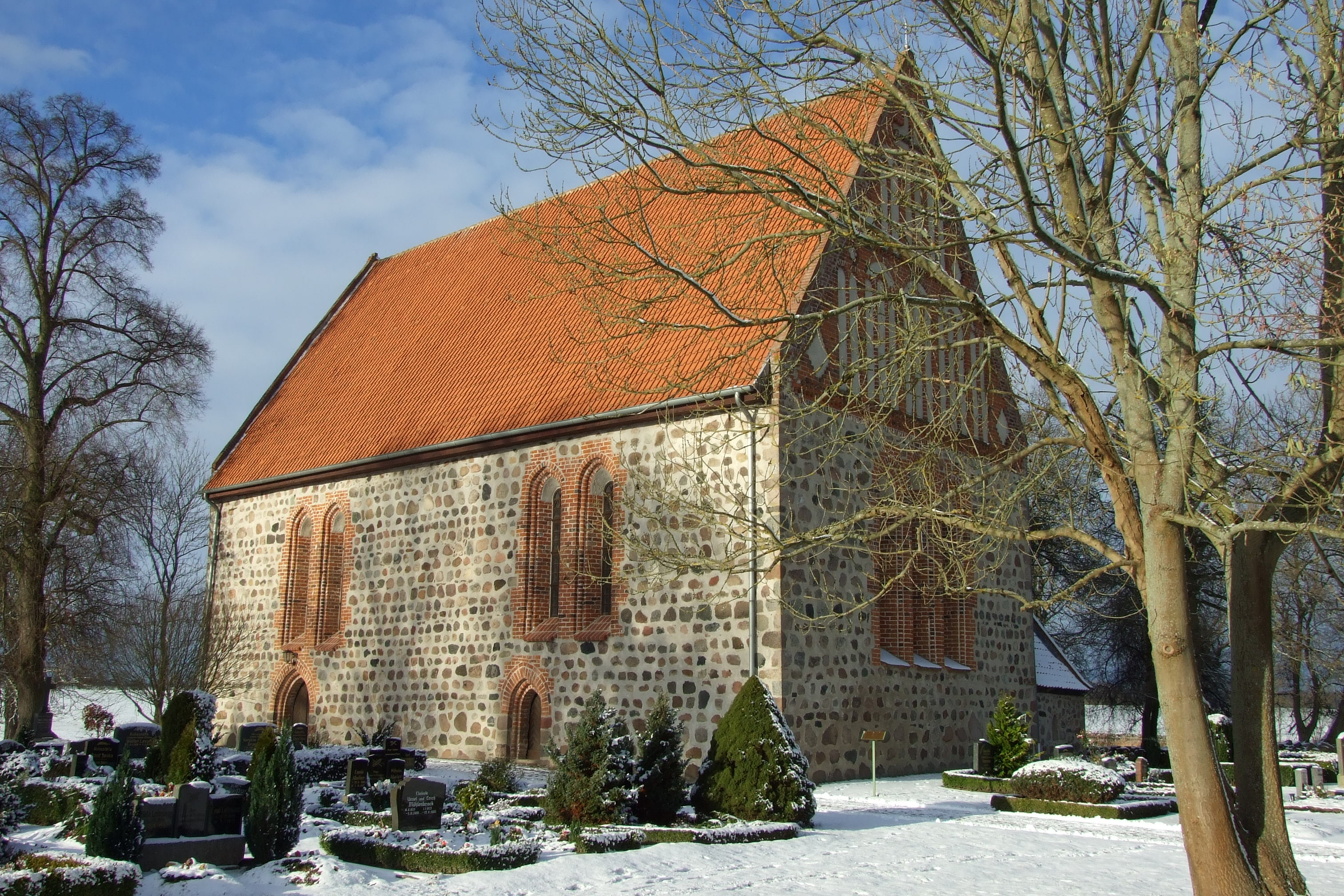
- Eixen Church

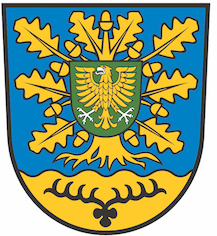
- Coat of arms

- Location of Eixen within Vorpommern-Rügen district
- Interactive map of Eixen
- Location within Germany Location within Mecklenburg-Vorpommern
- Coordinates: 54°10′N 12°43′E
- Country: Germany
- State: Mecklenburg-Vorpommern
- District: Vorpommern-Rügen
- Municipal assoc.: Recknitz-Trebeltal

Government
  - Mayor: André Bonitz

Area
  - Total: 55.98 km^{2} (21.61 sq mi)
- Elevation: 19 m (62 ft)

Population (2025-12-31)
  - Total: 664
  - Density: 11.9/km^{2} (30.7/sq mi)
- Time zone: UTC+01:00 (CET)
  - Summer (DST): UTC+02:00 (CEST)
- Postal codes: 18334
- Dialling codes: 038222
- Vehicle registration: NVP
- Website: www.eixen.info

Eixen is a municipality in the Vorpommern-Rügen district, in Mecklenburg-Vorpommern, Germany.
