= Glewitz =

- Municipality
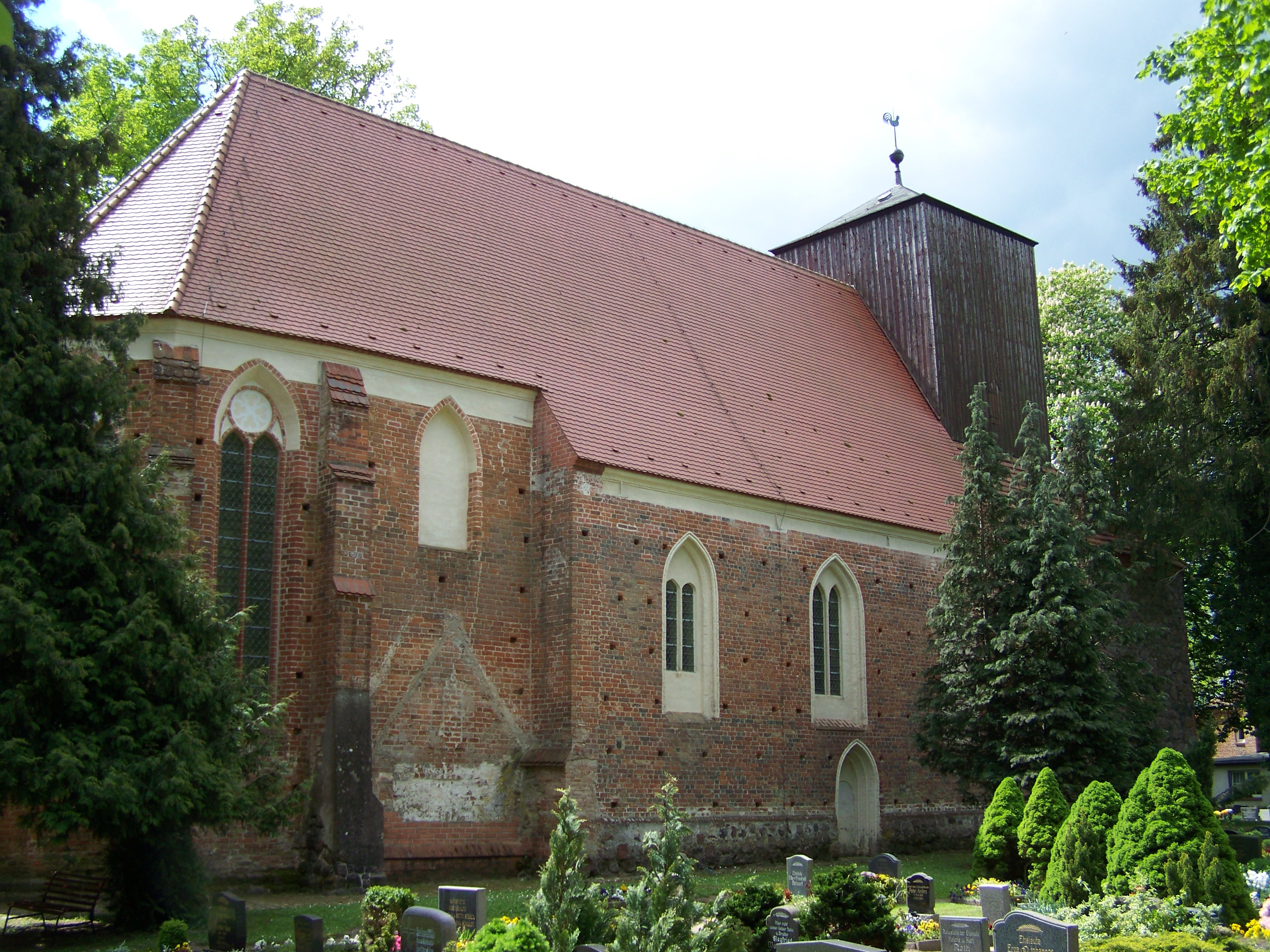
- Glewitz Church

- Location of Glewitz within Vorpommern-Rügen district
- Interactive map of Glewitz
- Location within Germany Location within Mecklenburg-Vorpommern
- Coordinates: 54°01′25″N 12°55′34″E
- Country: Germany
- State: Mecklenburg-Vorpommern
- District: Vorpommern-Rügen
- Municipal assoc.: Franzburg-Richtenberg

Government
  - Mayor: Christoph von Schack

Area
  - Total: 41.99 km^{2} (16.21 sq mi)
- Elevation: 7 m (23 ft)

Population (2025-12-31)
  - Total: 520
  - Density: 12/km^{2} (32/sq mi)
- Time zone: UTC+01:00 (CET)
  - Summer (DST): UTC+02:00 (CEST)
- Postal codes: 18513
- Dialling codes: 038334
- Vehicle registration: NVP
- Website: www.amt-franzburg-richtenberg.de

Glewitz is a municipality in the Vorpommern-Rügen district, in Mecklenburg-Vorpommern, Germany.
