= Barth (Amt) =

- Amt
- Location of Barth within Vorpommern-Rügen district
- Interactive map of Barth
- Location within Germany Location within Mecklenburg-Vorpommern
- Coordinates: 54°19′N 12°40′E
- Country: Germany
- State: Mecklenburg-Vorpommern
- District: Vorpommern-Rügen
- Seat: Barth
- Subdivisions: 10 municipalities

Area
  - Total: 244.49 km^{2} (94.40 sq mi)

Population (2025-12-31)
  - Total: 14,836
  - Density: 60.681/km^{2} (157.16/sq mi)
- Time zone: UTC+01:00 (CET)
  - Summer (DST): UTC+02:00 (CEST)
- Website: www.amt-barth.de

Barth is an Amt in the district of Vorpommern-Rügen, in Mecklenburg-Vorpommern, Germany. The seat of the Amt is in Barth.

The Amt Barth consists of the following municipalities:

1. Barth
2. Divitz-Spoldershagen
3. Fuhlendorf
4. Karnin
5. Kenz-Küstrow
6. Löbnitz
7. Lüdershagen
8. Pruchten
9. Saal
10. Trinwillershagen
