= Altenpleen (Amt) =

Administrative division in Germany

- Amt
- Location of Altenpleen within Vorpommern-Rügen district
- Interactive map of Altenpleen
- Location within Germany Location within Mecklenburg-Vorpommern
- Coordinates: 54°22′N 13°01′E
- Country: Germany
- State: Mecklenburg-Vorpommern
- District: Vorpommern-Rügen
- Seat: Altenpleen
- Subdivisions: 6 municipalities

Area
  - Total: 121.82 km^{2} (47.03 sq mi)

Population (2025-12-31)
  - Total: 7,543
  - Density: 61.92/km^{2} (160.4/sq mi)
- Time zone: UTC+01:00 (CET)
  - Summer (DST): UTC+02:00 (CEST)
- Website: www.amt-altenpleen.de

Altenpleen is an Amt in the district of Vorpommern-Rügen, in Mecklenburg-Vorpommern, Germany. The seat of the Amt is in Altenpleen.

The Amt Altenpleen consists of the following municipalities:

- Altenpleen
- Groß Mohrdorf
- Klausdorf
- Kramerhof
- Preetz
- Prohn
