= Fuhlendorf =

- Municipality
- Location of Fuhlendorf within Vorpommern-Rügen district
- Interactive map of Fuhlendorf
- Location within Germany Location within Mecklenburg-Vorpommern
- Coordinates: 54°21′38″N 12°36′10″E
- Country: Germany
- State: Mecklenburg-Vorpommern
- District: Vorpommern-Rügen
- Municipal assoc.: Barth

Government
  - Mayor: Eberhardt Groth

Area
  - Total: 17.04 km^{2} (6.58 sq mi)
- Elevation: 4 m (13 ft)

Population (2025-12-31)
  - Total: 825
  - Density: 48.4/km^{2} (125/sq mi)
- Time zone: UTC+01:00 (CET)
  - Summer (DST): UTC+02:00 (CEST)
- Postal codes: 1835
- Dialling codes: 038231
- Vehicle registration: NVP
- Website: www.amt-barth.de

Fuhlendorf is a municipality in the Vorpommern-Rügen district, in Mecklenburg-Vorpommern, Germany.
