= Divitz-Spoldershagen =

- Municipality
- Location of Divitz-Spoldershagen within Vorpommern-Rügen district
- Interactive map of Divitz-Spoldershagen
- Location within Germany Location within Mecklenburg-Vorpommern
- Coordinates: 54°19′N 12°40′E
- Country: Germany
- State: Mecklenburg-Vorpommern
- District: Vorpommern-Rügen
- Municipal assoc.: Barth

Government
  - Mayor: Christian Haß

Area
  - Total: 27.38 km^{2} (10.57 sq mi)
- Elevation: 5 m (16 ft)

Population (2025-12-31)
  - Total: 529
  - Density: 19.3/km^{2} (50.0/sq mi)
- Time zone: UTC+01:00 (CET)
  - Summer (DST): UTC+02:00 (CEST)
- Postal codes: 18356
- Dialling codes: 038231
- Vehicle registration: NVP
- Website: www.amt-barth.de

Divitz-Spoldershagen is a municipality in the Vorpommern-Rügen district, in Mecklenburg-Vorpommern, Germany.
