= Wittenhagen =

- Municipality
- Location of Wittenhagen within Vorpommern-Rügen district
- Interactive map of Wittenhagen
- Location within Germany Location within Mecklenburg-Vorpommern
- Coordinates: 54°11′N 13°05′E
- Country: Germany
- State: Mecklenburg-Vorpommern
- District: Vorpommern-Rügen
- Municipal assoc.: Miltzow

Government
  - Mayor: Klaus Weißbrodt

Area
  - Total: 46.92 km^{2} (18.12 sq mi)
- Elevation: 10 m (33 ft)

Population (2025-12-31)
  - Total: 1,149
  - Density: 24.49/km^{2} (63.42/sq mi)
- Time zone: UTC+01:00 (CET)
  - Summer (DST): UTC+02:00 (CEST)
- Postal codes: 18510
- Dialling codes: 038327
- Vehicle registration: NVP
- Website: www.amt-miltzow.de

Wittenhagen is a municipality in the Vorpommern-Rügen district, in Mecklenburg-Vorpommern, Germany.
