= Steinhagen, Rostock =

Steinhagen
- Municipality
- Location of Steinhagen within Rostock district
- Interactive map of Steinhagen
- Location within Germany Location within Mecklenburg-Vorpommern
- Coordinates: 53°51′00″N 11°55′59″E
- Country: Germany
- State: Mecklenburg-Vorpommern
- District: Rostock
- Municipal assoc.: Bützow-Land

Government
  - Mayor: Dirk Voß

Area
  - Total: 10.14 km^{2} (3.92 sq mi)
- Elevation: 18 m (59 ft)

Population (2025-12-31)
  - Total: 658
  - Density: 64.9/km^{2} (168/sq mi)
- Time zone: UTC+01:00 (CET)
  - Summer (DST): UTC+02:00 (CEST)
- Postal codes: 18246
- Dialling codes: 038461
- Vehicle registration: LRO
- Website: www.amt-buetzow-land.de

Steinhagen (German pronunciation: [ˈʃtaɪnhaːɡn̩]) is a municipality in the Rostock district, in Mecklenburg-Vorpommern, Germany.
