= Jakobsdorf =

- Municipality
- Location of Jakobsdorf within Vorpommern-Rügen district
- Interactive map of Jakobsdorf
- Location within Germany Location within Mecklenburg-Vorpommern
- Coordinates: 54°14′N 12°56′E
- Country: Germany
- State: Mecklenburg-Vorpommern
- District: Vorpommern-Rügen
- Municipal assoc.: Niepars

Government
  - Mayor: Iris Basinski

Area
  - Total: 17.67 km^{2} (6.82 sq mi)
- Elevation: 5 m (16 ft)

Population (2025-12-31)
  - Total: 423
  - Density: 23.9/km^{2} (62.0/sq mi)
- Time zone: UTC+01:00 (CET)
  - Summer (DST): UTC+02:00 (CEST)
- Postal codes: 18442
- Dialling codes: 038327
- Vehicle registration: NVP
- Website: www.amt-niepars.de

Jakobsdorf is a municipality in the Vorpommern-Rügen district, in Mecklenburg-Vorpommern, Germany.
