= Niepars (Amt) =

- Amt
- Location of Niepars within Vorpommern-Rügen district
- Interactive map of Niepars
- Location within Germany Location within Mecklenburg-Vorpommern
- Coordinates: 54°19′N 12°55′E
- Country: Germany
- State: Mecklenburg-Vorpommern
- District: Vorpommern-Rügen
- Seat: Niepars
- Subdivisions: 8 municipalities

Area
  - Total: 186.5 km^{2} (72.0 sq mi)

Population (2025-12-31)
  - Total: 9,613
  - Density: 51.54/km^{2} (133.5/sq mi)
- Time zone: UTC+01:00 (CET)
  - Summer (DST): UTC+02:00 (CEST)
- Website: www.amt-niepars.de

Niepars is an Amt in the district of Vorpommern-Rügen, in Mecklenburg-Vorpommern, Germany. The seat of the Amt is in Niepars.

The Amt Niepars consists of the following municipalities:

1. Groß Kordshagen
2. Jakobsdorf
3. Lüssow
4. Niepars
5. Pantelitz
6. Steinhagen
7. Wendorf
8. Zarrendorf
