= Gransebieth =

- Municipality
- Location of Gransebieth within Vorpommern-Rügen district
- Interactive map of Gransebieth
- Location within Germany Location within Mecklenburg-Vorpommern
- Coordinates: 54°04′N 12°53′E
- Country: Germany
- State: Mecklenburg-Vorpommern
- District: Vorpommern-Rügen
- Municipal assoc.: Recknitz-Trebeltal

Government
  - Mayor: Fred Lenter

Area
  - Total: 23.36 km^{2} (9.02 sq mi)
- Elevation: 14 m (46 ft)

Population (2025-12-31)
  - Total: 503
  - Density: 21.5/km^{2} (55.8/sq mi)
- Time zone: UTC+01:00 (CET)
  - Summer (DST): UTC+02:00 (CEST)
- Postal codes: 18513
- Dialling codes: 038334
- Vehicle registration: NVP
- Website: www.recknitz-trebeltal.de

Gransebieth is a municipality in the Vorpommern-Rügen district, in Mecklenburg-Vorpommern, Germany.
