= Prohner Stausee =

Lake in Germany

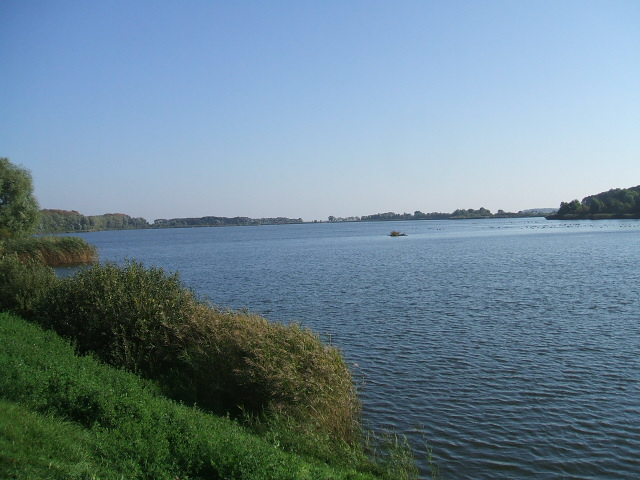

- Location within Mecklenburg-Vorpommern
- Location: Vorpommern-Rügen, Mecklenburg-Vorpommern
- Coordinates: 54°22′41.73″N 13°02′14.42″E
- Primary inflows: Prohner Bach
- Basin countries: Germany
- Max. length: 1.27 km (0.79 mi)
- Max. width: 0.53 km (0.33 mi)
- Surface area: 0.55 km^{2} (0.21 sq mi)
- Surface elevation: 2.6 m (8 ft 6 in)

Prohner Stausee is a lake in the Vorpommern-Rügen district in Mecklenburg-Vorpommern, Germany. At an elevation of 2.6 m, its surface area is 0.55 km².
