= Elmenhorst, Nordvorpommern =

Elmenhorst
- Municipality
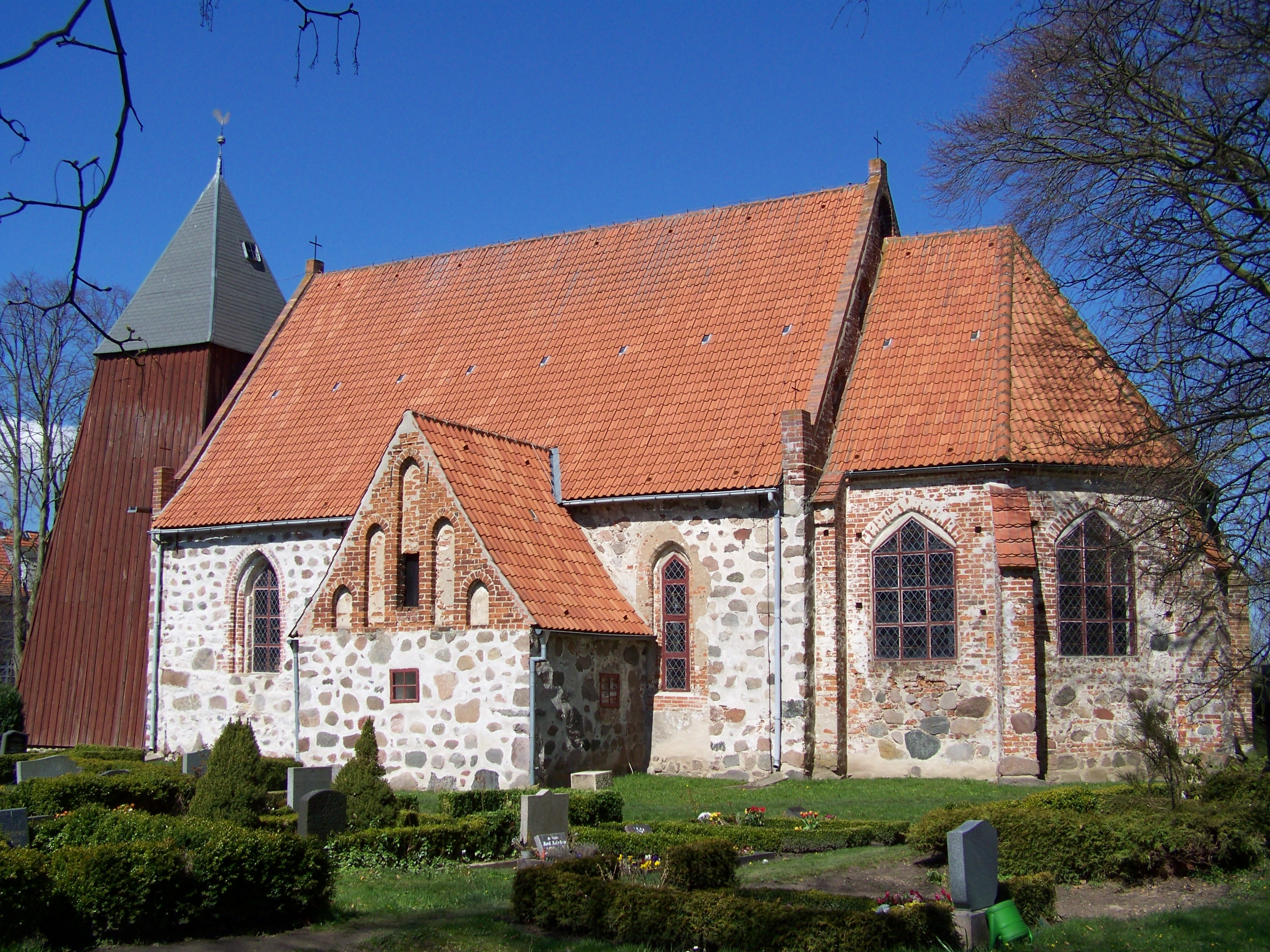
- Church

- Location of Elmenhorst within Vorpommern-Rügen district
- Interactive map of Elmenhorst
- Location within Germany Location within Mecklenburg-Vorpommern
- Coordinates: 54°13′N 13°04′E
- Country: Germany
- State: Mecklenburg-Vorpommern
- District: Vorpommern-Rügen
- Municipal assoc.: Miltzow

Government
  - Mayor: Heinz Hopp

Area
  - Total: 22.52 km^{2} (8.70 sq mi)
- Elevation: 10 m (33 ft)

Population (2025-12-31)
  - Total: 693
  - Density: 30.8/km^{2} (79.7/sq mi)
- Time zone: UTC+01:00 (CET)
  - Summer (DST): UTC+02:00 (CEST)
- Postal codes: 18510
- Dialling codes: 038327
- Vehicle registration: NVP
- Website: www.elmenhorst.amt-miltzow.de

Elmenhorst (German pronunciation: [ˈɛlmənhɔʁst]) is a municipality in the Vorpommern-Rügen district, in Mecklenburg-Vorpommern, Germany.

Elmenhorst is located about ten kilometers south of the city of Stralsund and about 15 kilometers north of Grimmen. Large parts of the municipal area are wooded, for example the Krummhagen Forest in the northwest. The Barthegraben forms the southern border of the municipality.
