= Vorpommern-Rügen =

Coordinates: 54°20′N 13°00′E

- District
- Flag Coat of arms

- Country: Germany
- State: Mecklenburg-Vorpommern
- Capital: Stralsund

Government
  - District admin.: Stefan Kerth (Independent)

Area
  - Total: 3,188 km^{2} (1,231 sq mi)

Population (31 December 2023)
  - Total: 216,175
  - Density: 68/km^{2} (180/sq mi)
- Time zone: UTC+01:00 (CET)
  - Summer (DST): UTC+02:00 (CEST)
- Vehicle registration: VR, GMN, NVP, RDG, RÜG; Stralsund: HST
- Website: www.lk-vr.de

Vorpommern-Rügen is a district in the north of Mecklenburg-Vorpommern, Germany. It is bounded by (from the west and clockwise) the Baltic Sea and the districts Vorpommern-Greifswald, Mecklenburgische Seenplatte and Rostock. The district seat is the Hanseatic city of Stralsund.

Vorpommern-Rügen is characterized by diverse shore line landscapes with many lagoons, beaches and cliff lines, part of them protected in the Western Pomerania Lagoon Area National Park and in the Jasmund National Park.

The area is also a very popular destination for national and international tourism, including Rügen, the biggest island of Germany, the island of Hiddensee, the Fischland-Darss-Zingst peninsula and its adjacent town of Barth with the Stralsund Barth Airport, the port of Sassnitz and the UNESCO World Heritage city of Stralsund.

The Vorpommern-Rügen district is one of the most popular places for national and international tourism in Germany, thanks to its unique protected nature, good infrastructure, popular resort architecture spas, historical towns and vast beaches at the shores of the Baltic Sea.

== History ==
Vorpommern-Rügen District was established by merging the former districts of Nordvorpommern and Rügen; along with the former district-free city of Stralsund as part of the local government reform of September 2011. The name of the district was decided by referendum on 4 September 2011. The project name for the district was Nordvorpommern.

== Geography ==
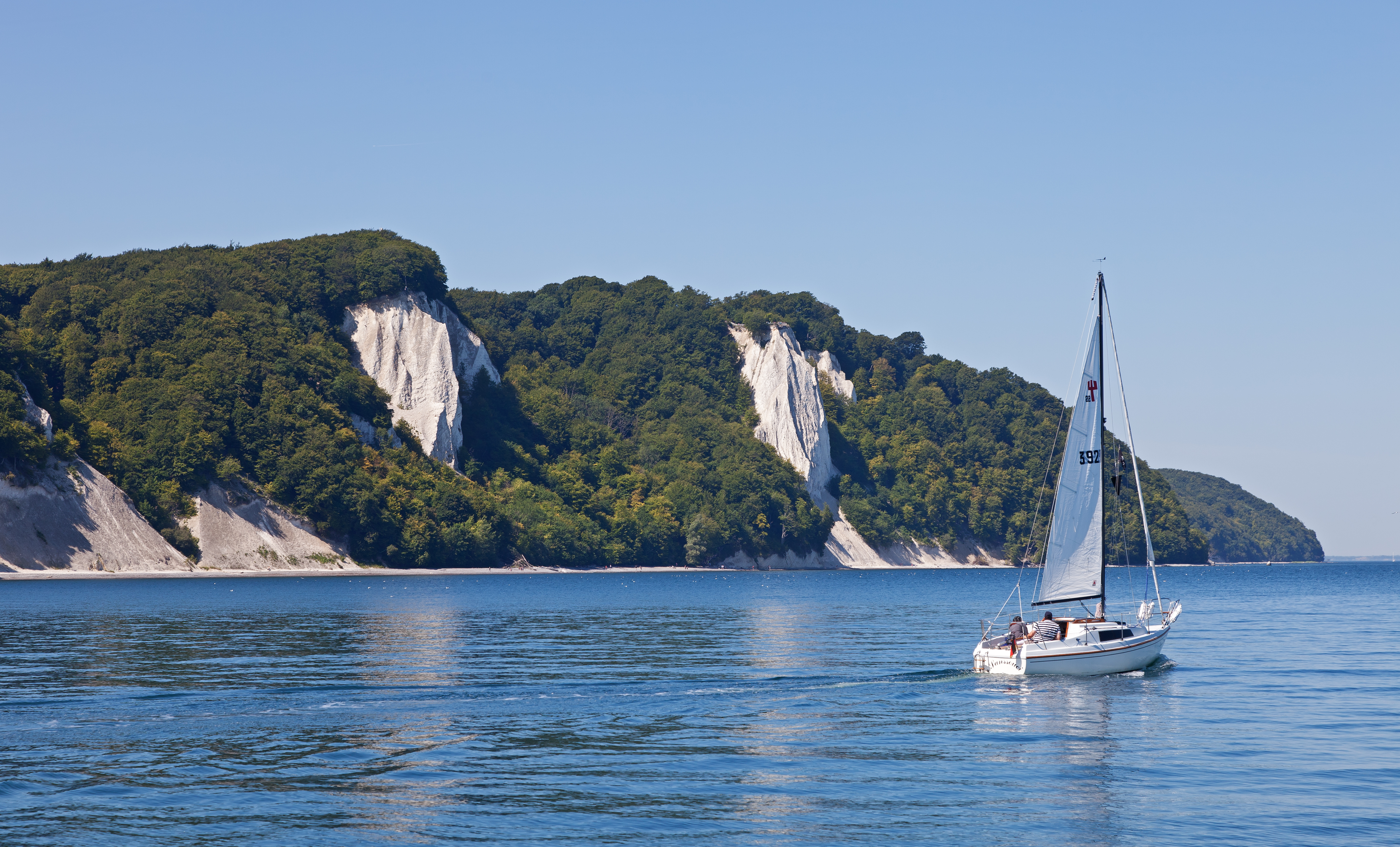
Sailing at the cliff shores of Jasmund National Park, island of Rügen.

The district has a number of lakes, which include:

Name	Elevation	Surface area
Günzer See	0.3 m (0.98 ft)	0.157 km^{2} (0.061 sq mi)
Nonnensee	16.1 m (53 ft)	0.7 km^{2} (0.27 sq mi)
Prohner Stausee	2.6 m (8.5 ft)	0.55 km^{2} (0.21 sq mi)
Pütter See	13 m (43 ft)	0.052 km^{2} (0.020 sq mi)
Schmachter See	1.1 m (3.6 ft)	1.18 km^{2} (0.46 sq mi)
Selliner See (Rügen)	0 m (0 ft)	1.38 km^{2} (0.53 sq mi)

== Towns and municipalities ==
Constituent Ämter of Vorpommern-Rügen

Amt-free towns
1. Grimmen
2. Marlow
3. Putbus
4. Sassnitz
5. Stralsund
Amt-free municipalities
1. Binz
2. Süderholz
3. Zingst

Ämter
1. Amt Altenpleen; 1. Altenpleen^{1}; 2. Groß Mohrdorf; 3. Klausdorf; 4. Kramerhof; 5. Preetz; 6. Prohn; 2. Amt Barth; 1. Barth^{1, 2}; 2. Divitz-Spoldershagen; 3. Fuhlendorf; 4. Karnin; 5. Kenz-Küstrow; 6. Löbnitz; 7. Lüdershagen; 8. Pruchten; 9. Saal; 10. Trinwillershagen; 3. Amt Bergen auf Rügen; 1. Bergen auf Rügen^{1, 2}; 2. Buschvitz; 3. Garz/Rügen^{2}; 4. Gustow; 5. Lietzow; 6. Parchtitz; 7. Patzig; 8. Poseritz; 9. Ralswiek; 10. Rappin; 11. Sehlen; 4. Amt Darß/Fischland; 1. Ahrenshoop; 2. Born^{1}; 3. Dierhagen; 4. Prerow; 5. Wieck auf dem Darß; 6. Wustrow	5. Amt Franzburg-Richtenberg; 1. Franzburg^{1, 2}; 2. Glewitz; 3. Gremersdorf-Buchholz; 4. Millienhagen-Oebelitz; 5. Papenhagen; 6. Richtenberg^{2}; 7. Splietsdorf; 8. Velgast; 9. Weitenhagen; 10. Wendisch Baggendorf; 6. Amt Miltzow; 1. Elmenhorst; 2. Sundhagen^{1}; 3. Wittenhagen; 7. Amt Mönchgut-Granitz; 1. Baabe^{1}; 2. Göhren; 3. Lancken-Granitz; 4. Mönchgut; 5. Sellin; 6. Zirkow; 8. Amt Niepars; 1. Groß Kordshagen; 2. Jakobsdorf; 3. Lüssow; 4. Niepars^{1}; 5. Pantelitz; 6. Steinhagen; 7. Wendorf; 8. Zarrendorf	9. Amt Nord-Rügen; 1. Altenkirchen; 2. Breege; 3. Dranske; 4. Glowe; 5. Lohme; 6. Putgarten; 7. Sagard^{1}; 8. Wiek; 10. Amt Recknitz-Trebeltal; 1. Bad Sülze^{2}; 2. Dettmannsdorf; 3. Deyelsdorf; 4. Drechow; 5. Eixen; 6. Grammendorf; 7. Gransebieth; 8. Hugoldsdorf; 9. Lindholz; 10. Tribsees^{1, 2}; 11. Amt Ribnitz-Damgarten; 1. Ahrenshagen-Daskow; 2. Ribnitz-Damgarten^{1, 2}; 3. Schlemmin; 4. Semlow; 12. Amt West-Rügen; 1. Altefähr; 2. Dreschvitz; 3. Gingst; 4. Insel Hiddensee; 5. Kluis; 6. Neuenkirchen; 7. Rambin; 8. Samtens^{1}; 9. Schaprode; 10. Trent; 11. Ummanz
^{1} - seat of the Amt; ^{2} - town
