= Steinhagen, Vorpommern-Rügen =

Steinhagen
- Municipality
- Location of Steinhagen within Vorpommern-Rügen district
- Interactive map of Steinhagen
- Location within Germany Location within Mecklenburg-Vorpommern
- Coordinates: 54°13′N 12°58′E
- Country: Germany
- State: Mecklenburg-Vorpommern
- District: Vorpommern-Rügen
- Municipal assoc.: Niepars

Government
  - Mayor: Dietmar Eifler

Area
  - Total: 33.49 km^{2} (12.93 sq mi)
- Elevation: 19 m (62 ft)

Population (2025-12-31)
  - Total: 2,657
  - Density: 79.34/km^{2} (205.5/sq mi)
- Time zone: UTC+01:00 (CET)
  - Summer (DST): UTC+02:00 (CEST)
- Postal codes: 18442
- Dialling codes: 038327
- Vehicle registration: NVP, VR
- Website: www.amt-niepars.de

Steinhagen (German pronunciation: [ˈʃtaɪnhaːɡn̩]) is a municipality in the Vorpommern-Rügen district, in Mecklenburg-Vorpommern, Germany.
