= Saal, Mecklenburg-Vorpommern =

Saal
- Municipality
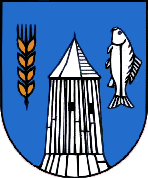
- Coat of arms

- Location of Saal within Vorpommern-Rügen district
- Interactive map of Saal
- Location within Germany Location within Mecklenburg-Vorpommern
- Coordinates: 54°19′N 12°30′E
- Country: Germany
- State: Mecklenburg-Vorpommern
- District: Vorpommern-Rügen
- Municipal assoc.: Barth

Government
  - Mayor: Wolfgang Pierson (CDU)

Area
  - Total: 48.52 km^{2} (18.73 sq mi)
- Elevation: 5 m (16 ft)

Population (2025-12-31)
  - Total: 1,448
  - Density: 29.84/km^{2} (77.29/sq mi)
- Time zone: UTC+01:00 (CET)
  - Summer (DST): UTC+02:00 (CEST)
- Postal codes: 18317
- Dialling codes: 038223
- Vehicle registration: NVP
- Website: www.barth.de

Saal is a municipality in the Vorpommern-Rügen district, in Mecklenburg-Vorpommern, Germany. The community is under the administration of the city of Barth. Saal was first documented in a deed of the city in 1255. At this time, there was an already abandoned Slavic castle by the mouth of the Saal. The population around 1255 consisted of indigenous Slav, migrants from Westphalia and Denmark. The first church, made of wood, already existed.
