= Bad Sülze =

Town in Mecklenburg-Vorpommern, Germany

- Town
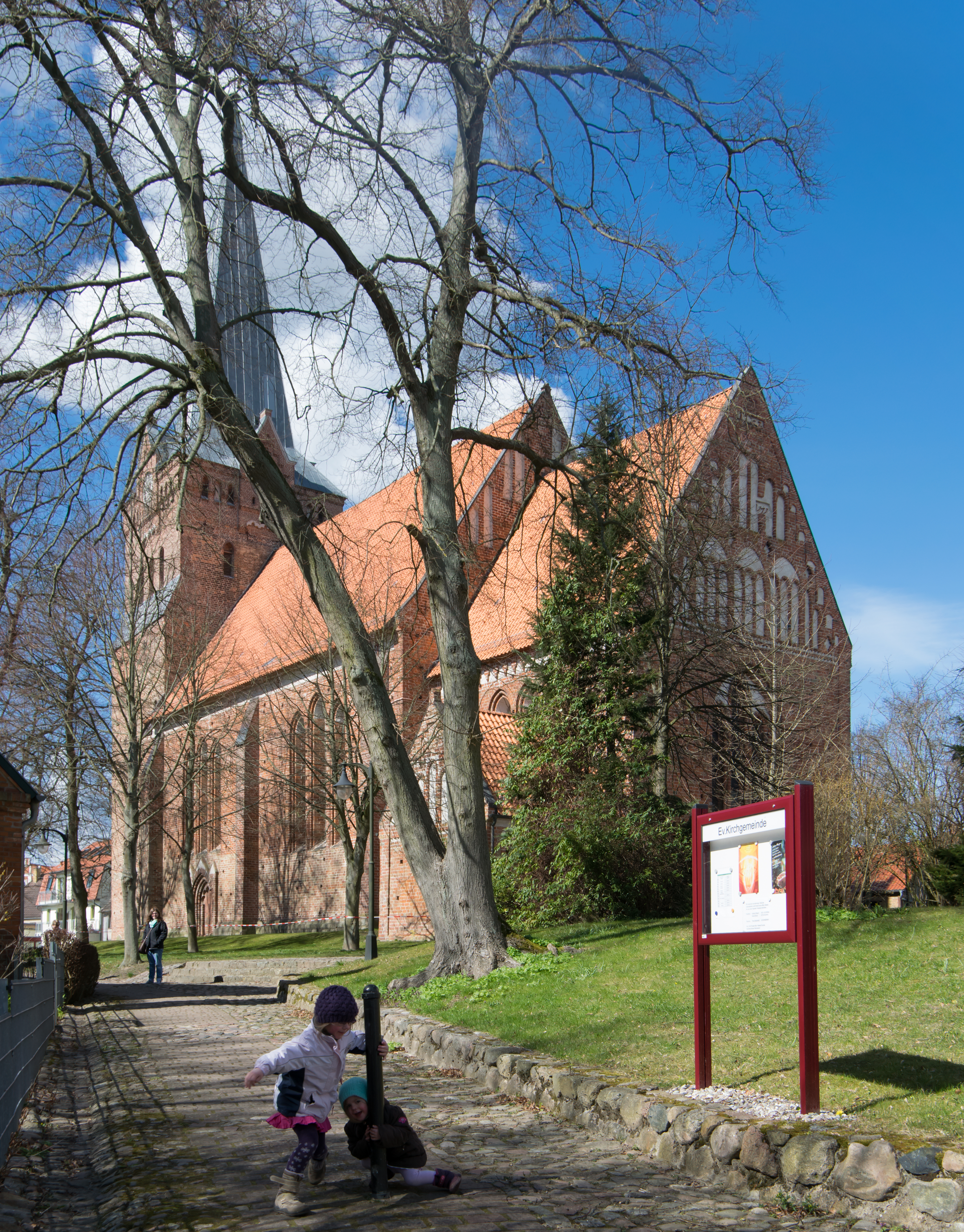
- Gothic church

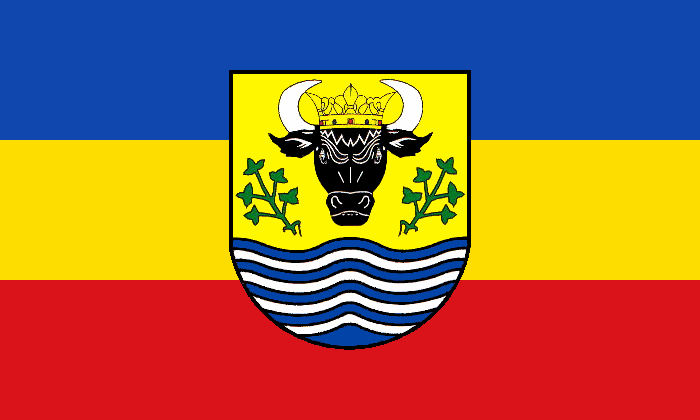
- Flag Coat of arms

- Location of Bad Sülze within Vorpommern-Rügen district
- Interactive map of Bad Sülze
- Location within Germany Location within Mecklenburg-Vorpommern
- Coordinates: 54°08′N 12°40′E
- Country: Germany
- State: Mecklenburg-Vorpommern
- District: Vorpommern-Rügen
- Municipal assoc.: Recknitz-Trebeltal

Government
  - Mayor: Doris Schmutzer

Area
  - Total: 26.66 km^{2} (10.29 sq mi)
- Elevation: 11 m (36 ft)

Population (2025-12-31)
  - Total: 1,649
  - Density: 61.85/km^{2} (160.2/sq mi)
- Time zone: UTC+01:00 (CET)
  - Summer (DST): UTC+02:00 (CEST)
- Postal codes: 18334
- Dialling codes: 038229
- Vehicle registration: NVP
- Website: https://www.stadtbadsuelze.de/

Bad Sülze (German: [baːt ˈzʏltsə], until 1927 Sülze) is a town in the Vorpommern-Rügen district, in Mecklenburg-Western Pomerania, Germany. It is situated on the river Recknitz, 35 km southwest of Stralsund, and 35 km east of Rostock.

Nearby geographical features include a group of three lakes called Torfkuhlen Bad Sülze.

Excavations on the Redderstorfer corridor have shown that a settlement in the area of the present town existed from the Neolithic to Bronze Age and, later, from the Slavic times to the Middle Ages. Bad Sülze is known for its spas and may be the oldest brine and moorbath in northern Germany.
