= DIGI Group =

Teraoka/DIGI Group
- Industry: Retail: POS system, Retail scales, Label printers, Weigh-wrap-labelers, ESL system, Pure water vending machines, Recycling machines, Hygiene & waste management, Cloud & server system Food Industry: Weigh-labeling system, Label printers & applicators, Packaging & sorting equipment, Package inspection system, Production management system Logistics: Industrial scales, Counting scales, Digital indicators, Postal scales, Weighing & cubing, Label printers, Handy terminals, Order picking & sorting system Hospitality: POS system, Order entry system, Self-ordering system, Ticket vending machines, Cloud system
- Founded: 1925
- Headquarters: Tokyo, Japan
- Key people: Kazuharu Teraoka (CEO)
- Revenue: 10.16 Billion USD (2021)
- Number of employees: 3,742

DIGI (Teraoka/DIGI Group) is a global corporation with offices in Japan, Europe and North America. Founded in 1925, it supplies weighing and packaging equipment for trade, industries, and logistics. Its products are widely used in the manufacturing, retail, and consumer fields. The company occupies 30% of the Russian market of weighing scales.

Although the company dates back to 1925, its activity dates back to 1910, when industrialist Teraoka Toyonaru created the Japan Calculation Machinery Manufacturing Co, which was focused on innovative technologies and supporting inventions. It produced precision instruments for industries and consumers. At the time of its inception, Teraoka had already developed weight scales capable of functioning under different temperature environments, which had been patented in Japan, the United States, the United Kingdom, Germany and France. Establishing itself firmly in its market, Teraoka Takeharu, son of Toyonaru, started the Teraoka Research Center (Teraoka Seiko Co., Ltd.), which would eventually form part of Teraoka/DIGI Group. The corporation presently operates five R&D centres and five production sites across Europe and Asia, as well as its own line of strain gauges.

Official Website: https://www.digisystem.com/

== Components of the Teraoka/DIGI Group ==
- Teraoka Seiko Co., Ltd. — global headquarters (Japan)
- DIGI I's Ltd. — production (Japan)
- Digi Singapore Pte. Ltd. — production (Singapore)
- DIGI Europe Ltd. — regional headquarters (United Kingdom)
- Shanghai Teraoka Electronic Co., Ltd. — sales and marketing (China)
- DIGI Software (Philippines) Inc. — software division (Philippines)
- DIGI Canada Inc. — North American headquarters
- DIGI Deutschland GmbH. — Germany division
- DIGI France S.A. — France division
- DIGI Nederland B.V. — Netherlands division
- DIGI BELGIUM — Belgium division
- DIGI Italia S.r.l. - Italy division
- DIGI TURKEY Elektronik San. ve Tic. Ltd. -Turkey division
- DIGI KOREA WEIGH SYSTEM CO., LTD. — South Korea division
- DIGI SYSTEM GURGAON PVT LTD. — India division
- Essae-Teraoka Ltd. — India division
- DIGI Imsispal S.A. Spain division

== See also ==
- CAS Corporation
- Mettler Toledo
- Bizerba
