= Ostdorf =

- Stadtteil of Balingen
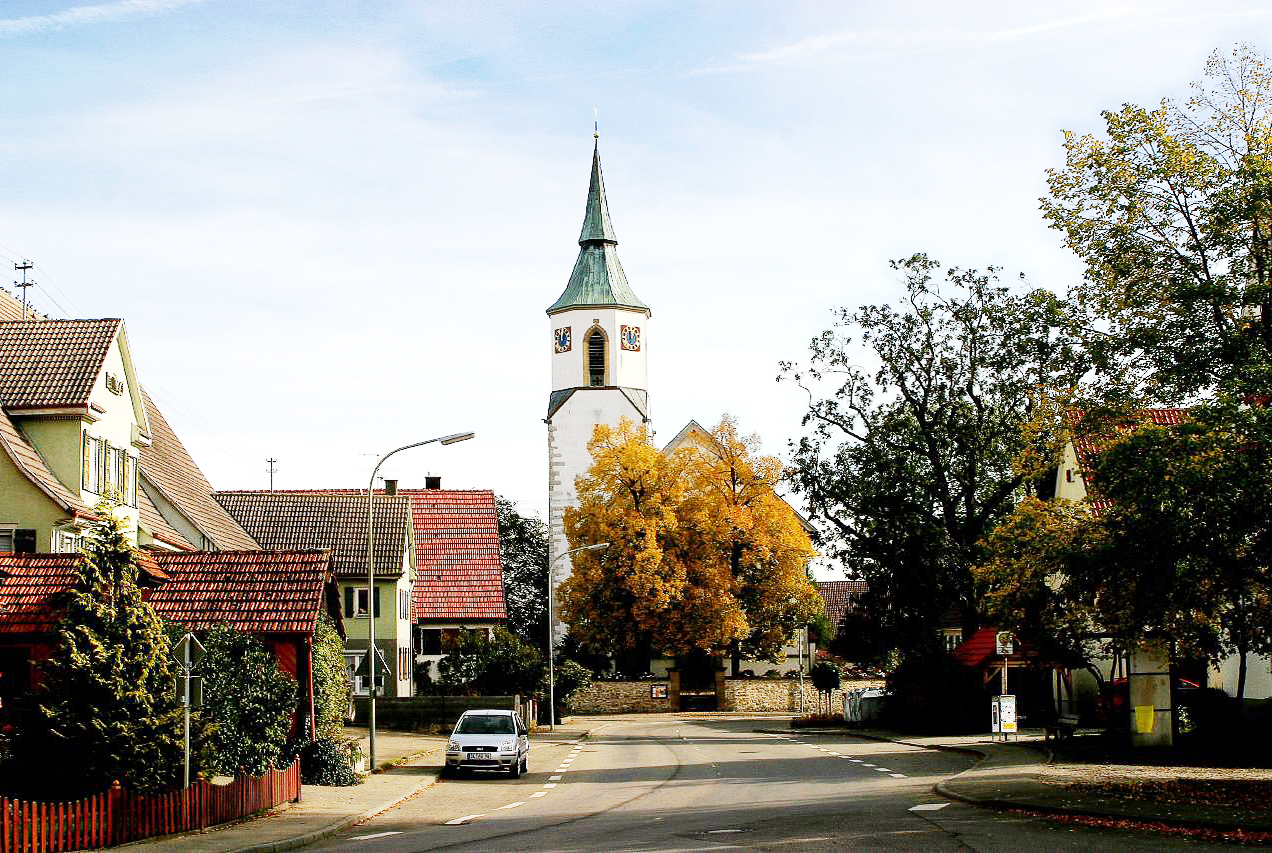
- The Ostdorf Town Center

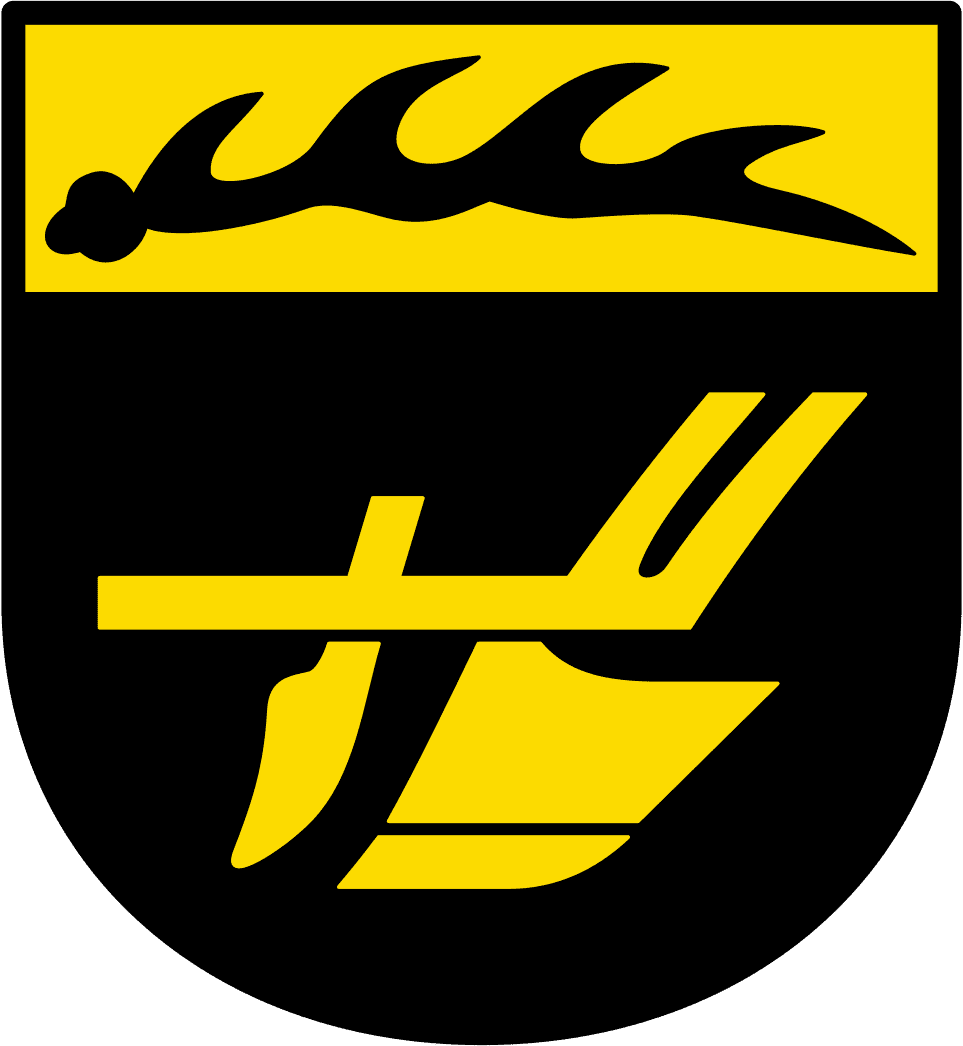
- Coat of arms
- Interactive map of Ostdorf
- Location within Germany Location within Baden-Württemberg
- Coordinates: 48°18′N 08°51′E
- Country: Germany
- State: Baden-Württemberg
- Admin. region: Tübingen
- District: Zollernalbkreis
- Town: Balingen

Area
  - Total: 6.55 km^{2} (2.53 sq mi)
- Elevation: 535 m (1,755 ft)

Population
  - Total: 1,599
  - Density: 244/km^{2} (632/sq mi)
- Time zone: UTC+01:00 (CET)
  - Summer (DST): UTC+02:00 (CEST)
- Postal codes: 72336
- Dialling codes: 07433
- Website: www.balingen.de

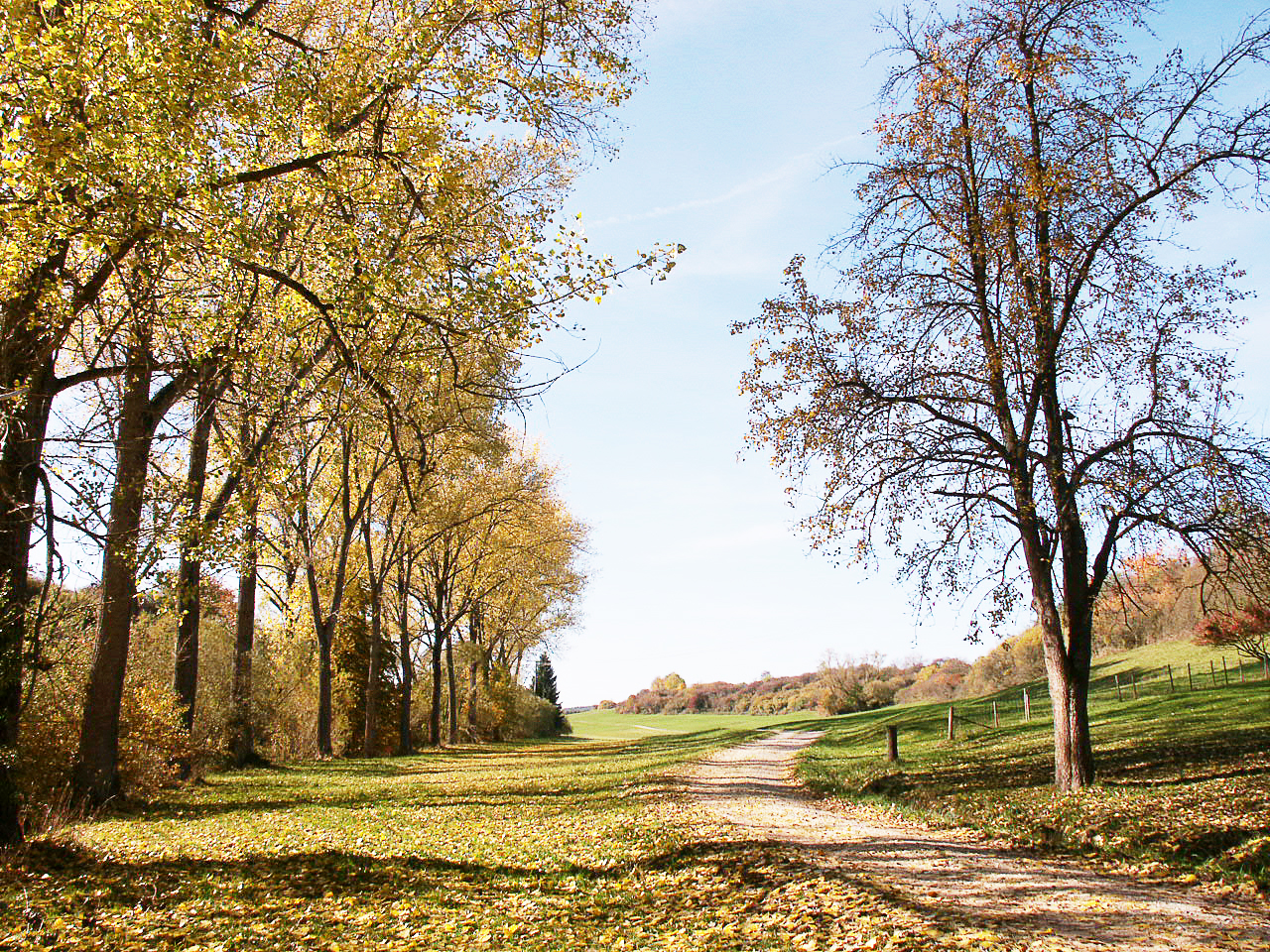
Typical country side found around Ostdorf, Germany.

Ostdorf is a Swabian village within the city limits of Balingen, Germany. Originally a village of its own, Ostdorf and Balingen have grown towards each other since the close of World War II. Finally, in 1971 Ostdorf was included to Balingen as a suburb. It is located 75 kilometers in the south of Stuttgart.

== Geography ==
=== Location ===
Ostdorf lies in the west of Balingen, near the Black Forest, on a plateau above the Eyach River, a tributary of the Neckar river.

The nearest high point is the Warren, 606 meters above sea level. Ostdorf has views of the Burg Hohenzollern castle, and the Swabian Alb mountains to the east. The surrounding area is covered with coniferous forest.

=== Neighbors ===
Nearby cities and villages include: Owingen (District of Haigerloch), Engstlatt, Balingen, Geislingen.

== History ==
The first settlement in the area was probably around the 7th or 8th Century. The first official mention of Ostdorf was in the 11th century when Albert von Ostdorf sold a fief of the area to the Salem Abbey. By 1287 Ostdorf belonged to the Duke of Teck.

After several pledges, in 1317 the village finally became the property of Eberhard I, Count of Württemberg. This is the oldest known connection of Ostdorf with the Württemberg kingdom. During the late Middle Ages, Ostdorf was already known for its rural prosperity, and had been known as a farming community. Not until 1949 did it gradually begin to attract industries. In 1971 it was included into the city limits of Balingen. Ostdorf remains, to this day, mostly a farming community.

- 1403: Ostdorf is designated as the location for the newly formed administrative office of the Balingen region within Württemberg.
- 1456: Local courts are mentioned
- 1525: Ostdorf has about 500 residents in 63 buildings. 48 farmers draw the village into the German Peasants' War.
- 1592: 225 of Ostdorfs' 662 inhabitants die from bubonic plague, a total of 34%.
- 1610: The first mention of a school in Ostdorf.
- 1616: A storm destroys the Tithe Barn (Zehntscheuer), and it is later rebuilt.
- 1690: Ostdorf builds its own separate town hall.
- 1787: First mention of a semi-annual cattle market.
- 1816: The Great European Famine of 1816, triggered by the eruption of the volcano Mount Tambora in Indonesia, brings drought and crop failure over large parts of Europe and North America. Also referred to as the Year Without a Summer.
- 1820: Three brewery plants are in operation in Ostdorf by this time.
- 1827: School opposite the church is inaugurated.
- 1832: Ostdorf Church expansion.
- 1847: Food shortages due to 3 successive years of poor potato harvests.
- 1852: After another bad harvest, 200 residents immigrate to North America.
- 1867: Gypsum mill on the Kaunter (Bach) opened (abandoned in 1910).
- 1875: Construction of new school begins.
- 1886: Liederkranz founded.
- 1889: Field cleanup
- 1903: Dairy cooperative started.
- 1911: Electrification of the town and water management programs begin.
- 1922: New School and Community Center (in German, Festhalle).
- 1930: Volunteer Fire Department founded.
- 1970: Demolition of the old town hall.
- 1971: Ostdorf becomes part of Ortschaftsrat, Balingen.
- 1986: Protestant (Lutheran) community building (formerly Beck'scher yard) is inaugurated.
- 1990: The historic Tithe Barn (Zehntscheuer) built in 1616 burns down. Ostdorf has plans to rebuild it.

== Origin of Town Name ==
A common misconception is that the name Ostdorf means the East-Village (in German Osten-Dorf) and that the village is east of Balingen. The town is actually north-west of Balingen, and the name means "Aust Village."

== Religion ==
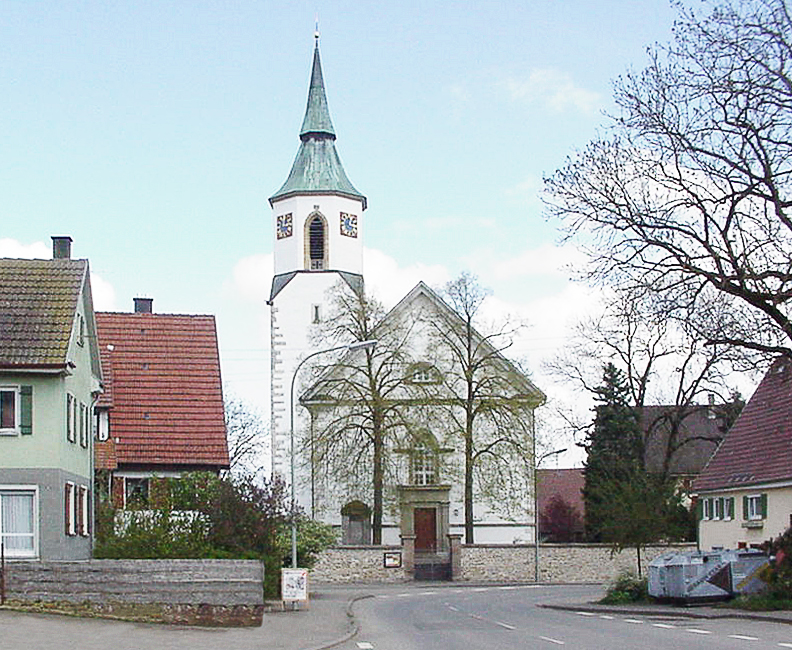
The Ostdorf Evangelische Church (Lutheran). Built in 1832.

Since the time of the Protestant Reformation, Ostdorf has remained predominantly Protestant Lutheran, and since 1547 has reported to the Dekanat Balingen (Office of the Dean, Balingen). The patron saint of Ostdorf is St. Medardus, a frequently honored saint within farming communities.

=== The Ostdorf Church ===
The Evangelische Lutheran Church that currently stands in Ostdorf was built in 1832, and was part of a major repair and expansion project to improve the church structures that were originally built in the 16th century. In 1843 the octagonal bell tower was built, and the copper roof added in 1861. The church has a congregations of 1,800 members and services the Ostdorf and Geislingen communities.

It was not until after 1945, due to the influx of displaced Germans after World War II, that the community again began registering Catholics in the city.

== Population ==
| Year | Inhabitants |
|---|---|
| 1525 | 500 |
| 1592 | 438 |
| 1794 | 809 |
| 1820 | 975 |
| 1875 | 992 |
| 1900 | 945 |
| 1959 | 1098 |
| 1992 | 1516 |
| 2005 | 1599 |

== Public Institutions ==
- Bauernmuseum Ostdorf (The Farmers Museum of Ostdorf) exhibits farm implements, rural office furniture, and bedroom furniture from the Balingen Area. It was opened in 1981 in the former historic village school building.
- Protestant Village Kindergarten Meadows

== Annual events ==
- May Day spring concert
- Autumn Festival with the Ostdorf Music Association (usually in October)
- Year-End concert with the Ostdorf Music Association
- The Spritzerfestival with the Ostdorf Volunteer Fire Brigade
- Father's Day celebration of FC Hirschväter
- Folklore evening at the Rathaus (city hall)
- Youth Choir of Apis Balingen and the Parish of Ostdorf Concert (usually three times a year)

== Notable Personalities ==
- Martin Haug (1827–1876), German Orientalist, born in Ostdorf

== Literature ==
- Stadtverwaltung Balingen. 800 Jahre Ostdorf. Balingen: SV Verlagsdruckerei, 2001. (rough translation - Ostdorf City Administration : 800 years)
