= Rudi Domidian =

German photographer and artist

Karl Rudi Domidian
- Born: 5 June 1954; Bad Kreuznach, Germany
- Known for: Land art
- Movement: Fluxus
- Elected: Board member Schwäbischer Albverein
- Website: hundefaenger.de

Rudi Domidian (born 5 June 1954) is a German artist, who calls himself "Hundefaenger", creating installation art and land art, which he photographs.

== Early life ==
Karl Rudi Domidian was born in Bad Kreuznach. He spent a lot of time in nearby woods, liked to draw. At the age of 17 he walked alone through Scotland. His parents did not support an artistic, but a commercial career. At the age of 23 he organised his first exhibition.

== Career ==
Domidian had his own studio at the age of 27. In 1984, aged 30, he liberated himself with Joseph Beuys' idea of human interactions as social sculpture. His first campaign was to hike the Pyrenees with friends, creating stone circles and to accept this as art.

In 1994, he met his wife Marion, a psychology student, and relocated to Bochum, Wuppertal and Norderney where she was studying. He worked odd temporary jobs, for example in exhibition stand construction, as warehouse clerk, as a toilet man with Opel. He surprised his employer asking for vacation to accept an invitation to attend an exhibition of his work in Korea.

In 2004, he moved to Sigmaringen, where his wife was employed at the hospital, and explored the woods, where he has been laying stone circles, suspending snail shells and arranging found wood. He has called these markings acts of "small anarchy", which cause confrontations with forest workers. His art collides with the demonstration of power by the local mainstream sculpture of the Hohenzollern, owner of the forest.

With the arrival of refugees in Germany in 2015–16, Domidian received an assignment to create a sculpture with found wood. Unlike his installations in the forest, which decay by themselves, he was ordered to remove them for fear that the wood poles could be used as weapons.

=== Work ===
From 2002-2015 he created numerous installations, as listed on Domidian´s website.

Exhibitions:

- 2015. "Roundabout", Weingarten
- 2016. "Houses of the Holy IV", installation boathouse Sigmaringen.
- 2016. "landart", 20 years of twin cities Sigmaringen - Feldkirch
- 2017. Karl Rudi Domidian, Galerie Weilheim, Kunstforum II
- 2017. Roundabout, Zweibrücken
- 2018. Sieben Kirschbäume, Sigmaringen
- 2019.„ich bin da – in bad+nach mit kirppu“, Bad Kreuznach
- 2019 Installation LEA Sigmaringen
- Photo book „shit art by birds“ - Art Zines (antipodes 09), V.E.B. Freie Brandstiftung (2016).

== Personal life ==
In 2004, he and his wife settled in an apartment in Sigmaringen. In 2014 his wife died.

He is a board member of the Schwäbischer Albverein, where he is a speaker and coordinator of hiking and trail maintenance.
