= Berghülen =

- Municipality
- Coat of arms

- Location of Berghülen within Alb-Donau-Kreis district
- Interactive map of Berghülen
- Location within Germany Location within Baden-Württemberg
- Coordinates: 48°27′50″N 9°45′41″E
- Country: Germany
- State: Baden-Württemberg
- Admin. region: Tübingen
- District: Alb-Donau-Kreis
- Subdivisions: 3

Government
  - Mayor (2022–30): Bernd Mangold

Area
  - Total: 26.13 km^{2} (10.09 sq mi)
- Elevation: 693 m (2,274 ft)

Population (2025-12-31)
  - Total: 2,096
  - Density: 80.21/km^{2} (207.8/sq mi)
- Time zone: UTC+01:00 (CET)
  - Summer (DST): UTC+02:00 (CEST)
- Postal codes: 89180
- Dialling codes: 07344
- Vehicle registration: UL
- Website: www.berghuelen.de

Berghülen (German pronunciation: [ˌbɛɐ̯kˈhyːlən]) is a municipality in the district of Alb-Donau in Baden-Württemberg in Germany.

== Geography ==
Berghülen is located 664–732 metres (2,178–2,402 ft) above sea level on the Swabian Jura about 20 kilometres (12 mi) west of Ulm. The municipality borders to the west and north to the town of Laichingen and to their districts Machtolsheim and Suppingen, on the east to Blaustein and on the south to the town of Blaubeuren.

== Municipality arrangement ==
Besides the eponymous Berghülen, the municipality includes two districts:

- Bühlenhausen with 437 inhabitants. Incorporation on 1 January 1972.
- Treffensbuch with 83 residents. Incorporation date is not ascertainable.

== History ==
The written history of the municipality Berghülen began with the first written mention of the district Bühlenhausen in a deed of the monastery Ochsenhausen, which was given to St. Blaise Abbey, Black Forest in 1100. Berghülen itself was in 1304 first mentioned in the documents with the donation of Count Henry of Tübingen to the monastery Blaubeuren. 1447 came all subsites together with Blaubeuren to the former county of Württemberg. Both in the Thirty Years' War 1618–1648 and in the Nine Years' War 1688–1697 under general Ezéchiel du Mas, Comte de Mélac Berghülen was taken hard. In 1763 a large part of the town was burnt down by carelessness. On 1 January 1972, the until then independent municipality Bühlenhausen was incorporated to Berghülen.

== Politics ==
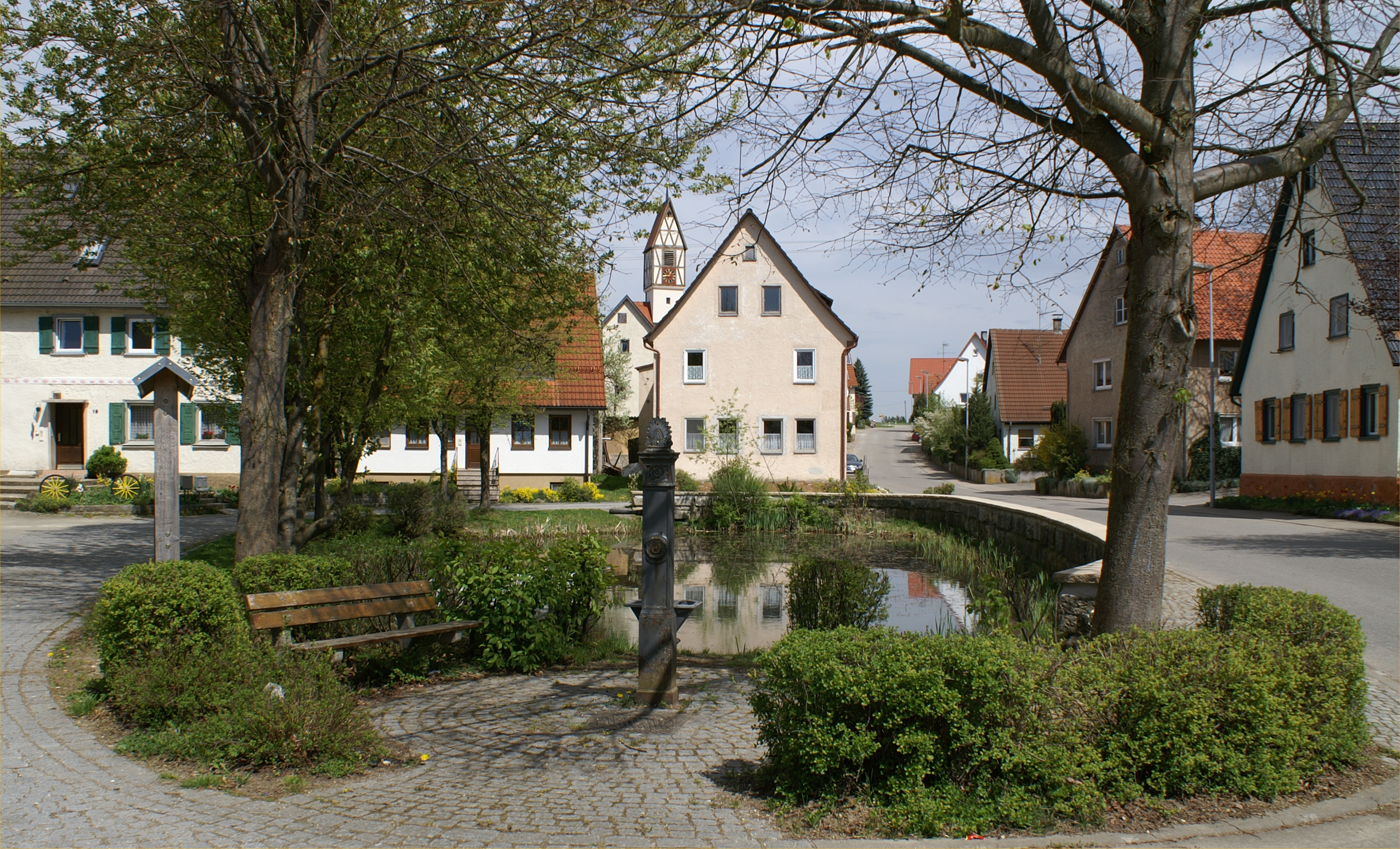
Hüle in Bühlenhausen

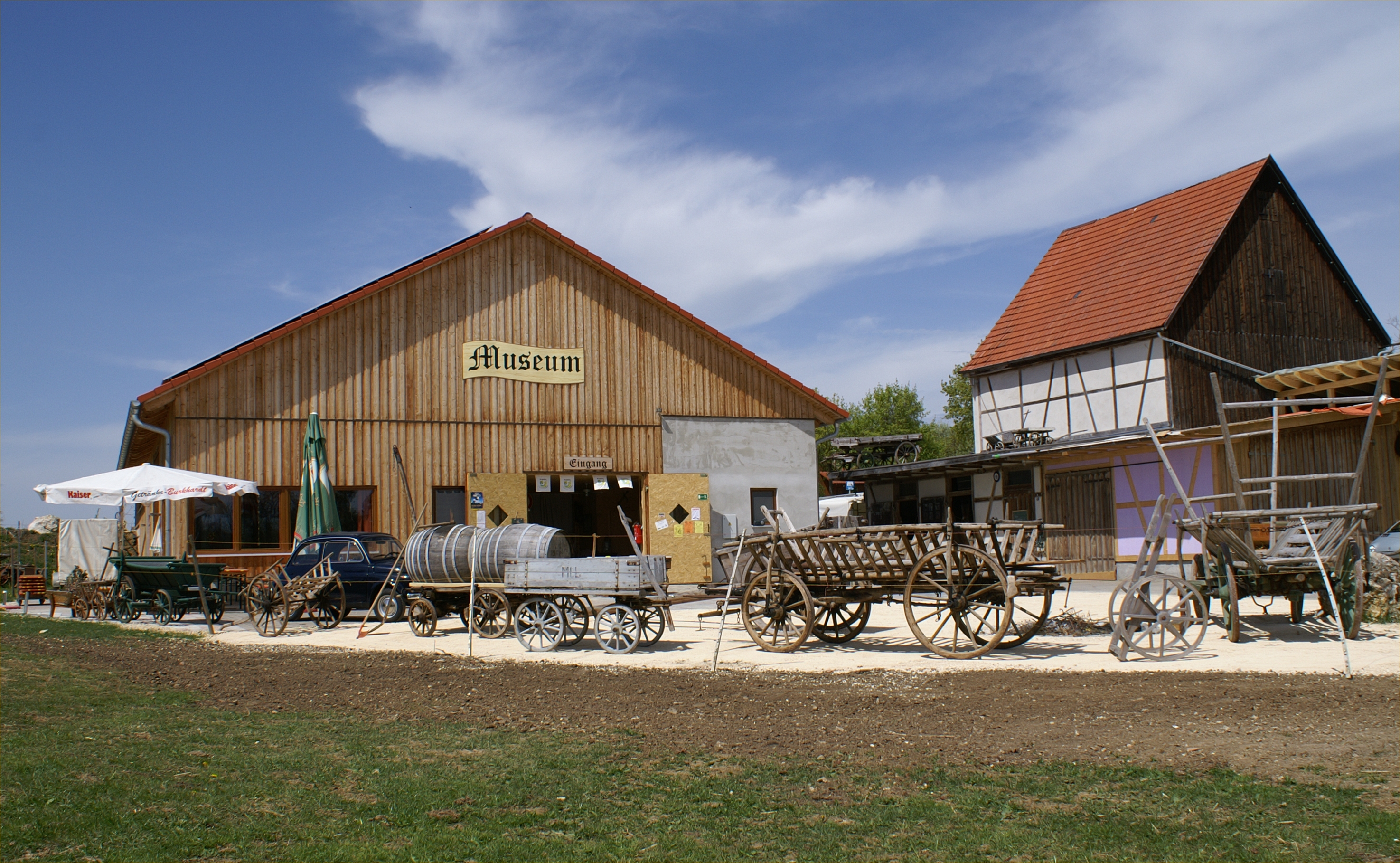
Bühlenhausen; Kutschenmuseum (coach museum)

=== Council ===
The council in Berghülen has 10 members. The local elections on 25 May 2014 led to the following official results. The council consists of the elected honorary councilors and the mayor as chairman. The mayor is entitled to vote in the municipal council.

- UL Independent list – 53.2% = 5 seats
- FL Free list – 46.8% = 5 seats
- Poll – 64.4%

== Crest ==
The award of arms was on November 17, 1938, by the Reichsstatthalter Wilhelm Murr. Blazon : "In a divided by wave section of gold and blue shield above a black deer rack, below a floating golden three mountain." In the upper half of the shield recalls the black Württemberg deer that Berghülen became part of Württemberg by merging together with the current district Bühlenhausen in 1447. The lower half of the shield makes the coat of arms "talking", the three mountains are for the first, the shaft section and the color blue for the second part of the municipality name (hüle = village pond, livestock watering).

=== Crests Bühlenhausen ===
The right to use a coat of arms was awarded to the former community Bühlenhausen on 30 July 1953, by the Regierungspräsidium Nordwürttemberg (Administration of North Württemberg). Blazon: "In divided blade, top in gold a horizontal black deer rack, below in red a silver lying wolf rod." The Bühlenhausen emblem symbolises the black deer rack belonging to Altwürttemberg (Old Württemberg). The lying double hook, goes back to an old spot signs and the colours silver and red in the lower panel indicate the counts of Helfenstein.

== Economy and Infrastructure ==
=== Companies ===
The largest employer in Berghülen is the fruit juice manufacturer Albi in Bühlenhausen.

== Education ==
In Berghülen there is a primary and secondary school with Werkrealschule. More schools are available in Blaubeuren, in Laichingen, Gerhausen and in Ulm.

== Points of interest ==
=== Museums ===
- Carriage Museum in Bühlenhausen: the museum displays more than 100 coaches and carriages from the last two centuries.

=== Attractions ===
- The "Pretty stone" in a valley east of Treffensbuch: a former landmark between the dominions of Ulm, Württemberg and Helfenstein.
- Huele in Bühlenhausen: it represents one of the last remaining Hülen in the Swabian Jura.
- Hülenpfad of the municipality Berghülen (Hülen track)
- Hay barn in Bühlenhausen

=== Regular events ===
- Every year is in Berghülen the Maifest. It takes place on the first weekend of May with a concert event with groups of the rock scene, like Thomas D, Subway to Sally, Molotov (band).
- Every year in August takes place the traditional mutton running of the gunners club Berghülen 1923. Here a mutton is raffled to the participants.

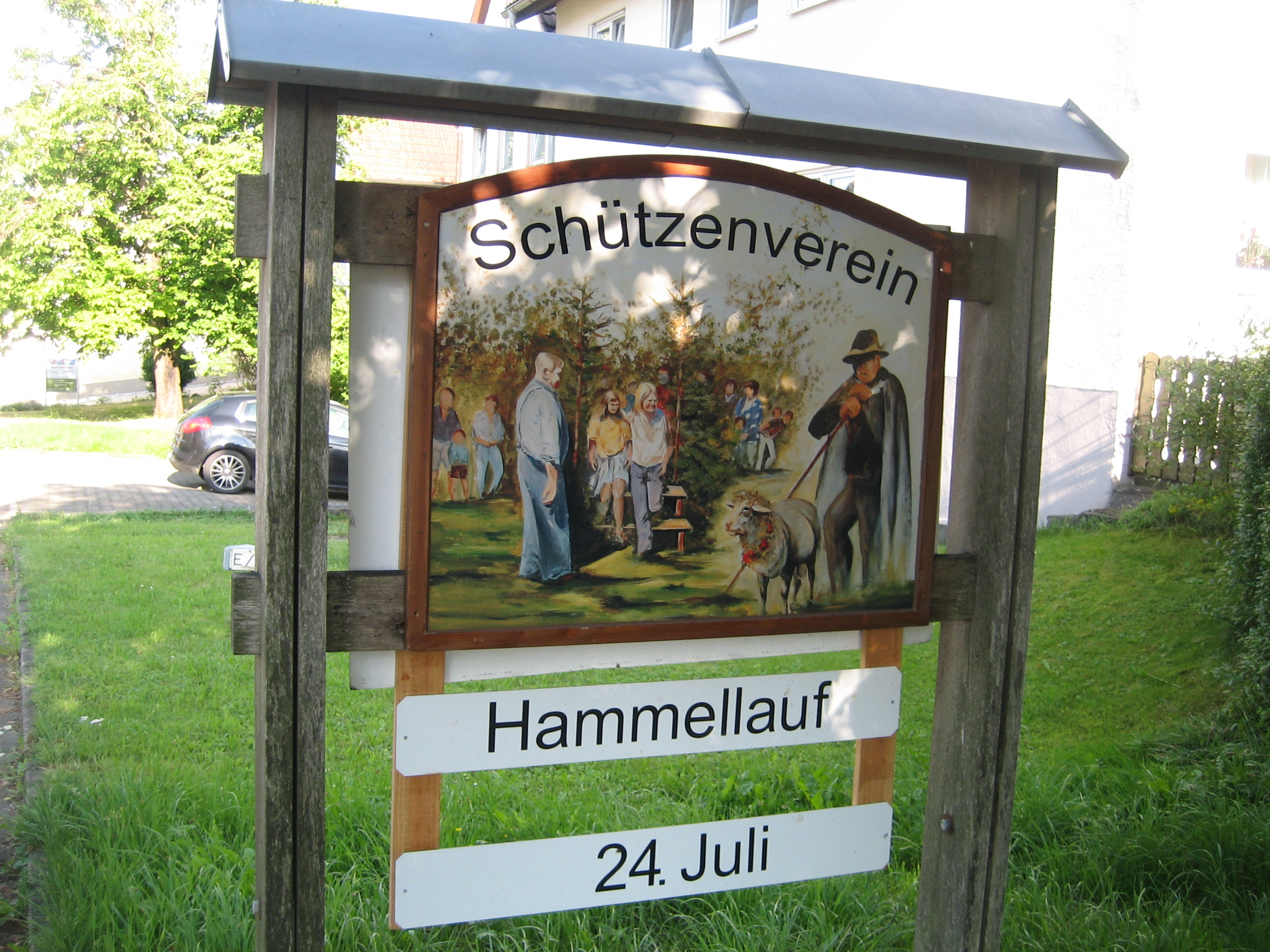
Berghülen (Alb-Donau-district) Mutton running

- The Württemberg Christus Union organizes annually a large soapbox race. The fastest box and the most creative box will be awarded.
- Every year in December the Berghülen Advent evening takes place.
- Every 2 years the day of the trades is organized by the Commercial Association Berghülen in the commercial area.
- Every 3 years takes place in Berghülen the Fountain Festival, which is organized by the Swabian Alb Club from Berghülen.

== Teams ==
=== Sports ===
The largest sports club in the municipality is the gymnastics and sports club. It was founded on 7 November 1931 and includes nearly 800 members in seven departments. These are: volleyball, football, chess, skiing, tennis, table tennis and gymnastics. In addition, there is yet another sports club, the shooting club Berghülen 1923.

=== Other teams ===
There are the following additional clubs and associations: Bund für Umwelt und Naturschutz Deutschland abbreviation BUND (Federation for Environment and Nature Conservation Germany), volunteer fire department, singing club, youth club, rural women, rural youth, trombones club, Swabian Jura Club, VdK (social association Germany VdK Germany).

== Transportation ==
As part of the new Wendlingen-Ulm high-speed railway is considered the establishment of a new station Merklingen (Swabian Jura). Berghülen would finance part of the costs of the station.

== Sons and daughters of the town ==
- Hans Rösch (sen) (dates of life unknown), founded the Albi fruit juice company in 1928
- Gottlieb Shepherd (* around 1910, died around 1940), sculptor
