= Frankenlied =

Anthem of Franconia

English: Song of Franconia
- Regional anthem of Franconia
- Lyrics: Joseph Victor von Scheffel, 1859
- Music: Valentin Eduard Becker, 1861

The Frankenlied (Song of Franconia), or Lied der Franken (The Franconians' song) is the unofficial anthem of the German region of Franconia, and one of the most popular German commercium songs. It is also sung at official occasions in the districts of Lower Franconia, Middle Franconia, and Upper Franconia. The text of the hymn was written by Joseph Victor von Scheffel in 1859, the melody was composed by Valentin Eduard Becker in 1861.

== Origins ==
Scheffel originally wrote the song as a hiking song in order to capture the wanderlust literarily in 1859. Back then, the writer, who was born in the Grand Duchy of Baden, spent a couple of weeks at the Franconian Banz Castle, located near the Staffelberg.

Various versions of the song exist on the internet and in songbooks. The lyrics themselves also contain inconsistencies in regard to content. The patron saint of the vintners is not actually Saint Kilian—the patron saint of Franconia—but Saint Urban of Langres. Apart from that, a Saint Veit of Staffelstein does not exist, but a Saint Veit of the Ansberg, whose chapel is located on the Ansberg hill near Dittersbrunn, a district of Ebensfeld, does. However, it could also be one of the Fourteen Holy Helpers who are venerated in the Basilica of the Fourteen Holy Helpers located near Bad Staffelstein. The best explanation for this discrepancy may be derived from the Staffelberg's history. From 1696 to 1929, religious hermits were living on the hill. Von Scheffel may thus have meant the hermit Ivo Hennemann who was living on the Staffelberg at the time. In the lyrics, von Scheffel describes how he ascends to "Veit" (see 4th stanza) and drinks his wine (see 6th stanza).

== Sheet music ==
- as audio example, created in Finale 2010

== Lyrics ==
Wohlauf, die Luft geht frisch und rein,
wer lange sitzt, muss rosten.
Den allerschönsten^{1} Sonnenschein
lässt uns der Himmel kosten.
Jetzt reicht mir Stab und Ordenskleid
der fahrenden Scholaren.
Ich will zur schönen Sommerszeit
ins Land der Franken fahren,
valeri, valera, valeri, valera,
ins Land der Franken fahren!

Der Wald steht grün, die Jagd geht gut,
schwer ist das Korn geraten.
Sie können auf des Maines Flut
die Schiffe kaum verladen.
Bald hebt sich auch das Herbsten an,
die Kelter harrt des Weines.
Der Winzer Schutzherr Kilian
beschert uns etwas Feines,
valeri, valera, valeri, valera,
beschert uns etwas Feines.

Wallfahrer ziehen durch das Tal
mit fliegenden Standarten.
Hell grüßt ihr doppelter Choral
den weiten Gottesgarten.
Wie gerne wär’ ich mitgewallt,
ihr Pfarr’ wollt mich nicht haben!
So muss ich seitwärts durch den Wald
als räudig Schäflein traben,
valeri, valera, valeri, valera,
als räudig Schäflein traben.

Zum heil’gen Veit von Staffelstein
komm ich empor gestiegen,
und seh’ die Lande um den Main
zu meinen Füßen liegen.
Von Bamberg bis zum Grabfeldgau
umrahmen Berg und Hügel
die breite stromdurchglänzte Au.
Ich wollt’, mir wüchsen Flügel,
valeri, valera, valeri, valera,
ich wollt’, mir wüchsen Flügel.

Einsiedelmann ist nicht zu Haus’,
dieweil es Zeit zu mähen.
Ich seh’ ihn an der Halde drauß’
bei einer Schnitt’rin stehen.
Verfahr’ner Schüler Stoßgebet
heißt: Herr, gib uns zu trinken!
Doch wer bei schöner Schnitt’rin steht,
dem mag man lange winken,
valeri, valera, valeri, valera,
dem mag man lange winken.

Einsiedel, das war missgetan,
dass du dich hubst von hinnen!
Es liegt, ich seh’s dem Keller an,
ein guter Jahrgang drinnen.
Hoiho, die Pforten brech’ ich ein
und trinke, was ich finde.
Du heil’ger Veit von Staffelstein
verzeih mir Durst und Sünde,
valeri, valera, valeri, valera,
verzeih mir Durst und Sünde!

Translation:

Get up, the air blows fresh and clean,
those who sit for long have to rust.
The sky lets us taste
the most beautiful sunshine.
Now hand me the staff and habit
of the wandering scholars.
I want to travel to the land of the Franconians
during the beautiful summertime.
Valeri, valera, valeri, valera,
travel to the land of the Franconians!

The woods are green, the hunting's good
the grain has become heavy.
They can hardly load the ships
on the floods of the river Main.
Soon the grape harvest will begin,
the wine press awaits the wine.
The patron saint of the vintners, Kilian,
bestows something nice on us.
Valeri, valera, valeri, valera,
bestows something nice on us.

Pilgrims travel through the valley
with flying standards.
Their double chorus greets highly
the vast divine garden.
How I would have loved to come along,
their priest did not want me!
So I must trot as a mangy lamb
sideways through the woods.
Valeri, valera, valeri, valera,
trot as a mangy lamb

I ascend
to the Saint Veit of Staffelstein,
and see the land around the Main
lying at my feet.
From Bamberg to the Grabfeld Gau
mountains and hills frame
the broad pasture divided by a shining stream.
I wish I would grow wings,
Valeri, valera, valeri, valera,
I wish I would grow wings.

The hermit is not at home,
meanwhile, it is time to reap.
I see him outside on the side of the hill
near a [female] reaper.
The lost student's quick prayer
reads: Lord, give us something to drink!
But you can wave for a long time
at him who stands near a beautiful [female] reaper,
valeri, valera, valeri, valera,
you can wave at him for a long time.

Hermit, that was unbecoming
of you to run away!
There is, I can see it from the looks of the cellar,
a good vintage within.
Hoiho! I break down the doors
and drink what I find.
You Saint Veit of Staffelstein,
forgive my thirst and sin!
Valeri, valera, valeri, valera,
forgive my thirst and sin!

^{1} depending on the recorded text version, "allerschönsten" (most beautiful; most received version), "allersonn'gsten" (most sunny), or "allersonnigsten" (most sunny; cannot be sung as it has one syllable too much)

== Franconian additions ==
The additional stanzas seven, eight, and nine, which were written by Gerd Bachert, Hermann Wirth, and Karl Frisch, are not officially part of the Frankenlied. In them, the writers criticise the attempted annexation of Franconia by Bavaria caused by Napoleon.

German	English
7. O heil’ger Veit von Staffelstein, beschütze deine Franken und jag’ die Bayern aus dem Land! Wir wollen’s ewig danken. Wir wollen freie Franken sein und nicht der Bayern Knechte. O heil’ger Veit von Staffelstein, wir fordern uns’re Rechte! Valeri, valera, valeri, valera, wir fordern uns’re Rechte!	7. O Saint Veit of Staffelstein, protect your Franconians and chase the Bavarians out of the land! We shall be eternally grateful. We want to be free Franconians and not servants to the Bavarians. O Saint Veit of Staffelstein, we demand our rights! Valeri, valera, valeri, valera, we demand our rights!
8. Napoleon gab als Judaslohn; —ohne selbst es zu besitzen— unser Franken und eine Königskron’ seinen bayrischen Komplizen. Die haben fröhlich dann geraubt uns Kunst, Kultur und Steuern, und damit München aufgebaut. Wir müssen sie bald feuern! Valeri, valera, valeri, valera, wir müssen sie bald feuern!	8. Napoleon gave as traitor's reward; —without owning it himself— our Franconia and a king's crown to his Bavarian accomplices. They then have looted merrily our art, culture and taxes, and built Munich with it. We have to drive them out soon! Valeri, valera, valeri, valera, we have to drive them out soon!
9. Drum, heil’ger Veit von Staffelstein, Du Retter aller Franken: Bewahre uns vor Not und Pein, weis’ Bayern in die Schranken! Wir woll’n nicht mehr geduldig sein, denn nach zweihundert Jahren, woll’n wir—es muss doch möglich sein— durch’s freie Franken fahren! Valeri, valera, valeri, valera, durch’s freie Franken fahren!	9. Therefore, Saint Veit of Staffelstein, You saviour of all Franconians: Protect us from misery and agony, put the Bavarians in their place! We do not want to be patient any more, as after two hundred years we want to—it must be possible— travel through the free Franconia! Valeri, valera, valeri, valera, travel through the free Franconia!
