= Johann Tobias Beck =

German theologian (1804–1878)

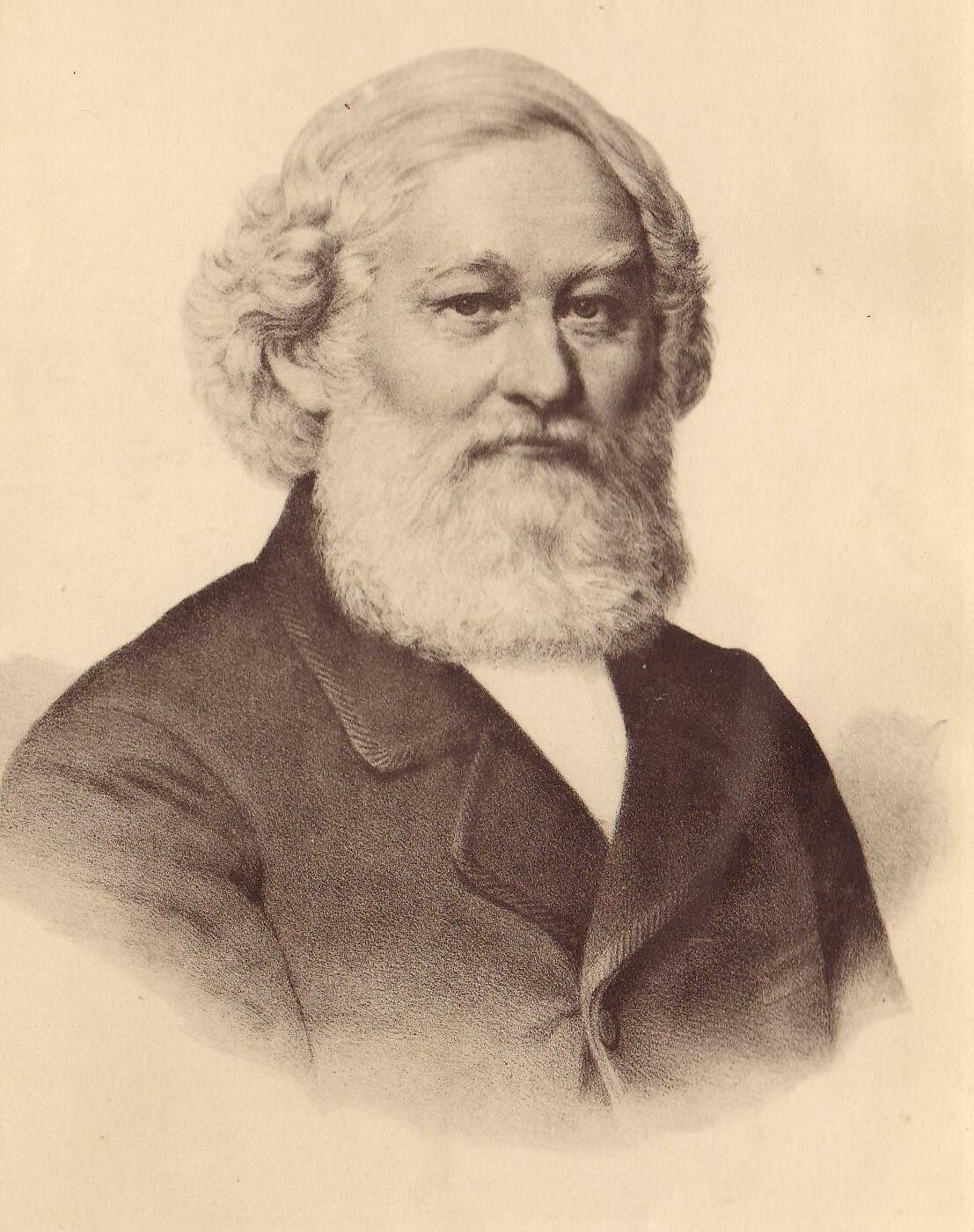
Johann Tobias Beck

Johann Tobias Beck (22 February 1804 in Balingen, Duchy of Württemberg – 28 December 1878 in Tübingen) was a German theologian.

== Biography ==
Graduating from the University of Tübingen in 1826, he was ordained a minister, but later accepted an appointment as professor of theology at the University of Basel. In 1843 he went to Tübingen, where he filled the same position.

He was one of the Tübingen faculty who was strongly opposed to the general radical tendency of that university, under the influence of F. C. Baur, the leader of the so-called Tübingen school. Beck was and remained absolutely orthodox.

He was known as a critic of both left and right wing Christian groups in Germany in the 19th century. His polemical style centered around "biblical realism," which considered the scriptures as an integrated system in and of themselves, an unconditional authority over both Enlightenment-style reasoning and ecclesiastical confessions.

As for doctrinal science, Beck held that there was no such thing as "speculative knowledge," but only "believing knowledge," which he called gnosis. Anything not biblically given (and believed as such) does not qualify as real knowledge of God. It needs neither human philosophy or churchly synthesis in order to be the truth, though spiritual (pneumatische) exegesis had its place by virtue of the work of the Holy Spirit. In such a way, "The scientific theological system should thus reproduce the real life-system of the biblical doctrine, for which the coherent activity of God is central."

Karl Barth (among others) has responded to J.T. Beck as an important dialogue partner.

== Works ==
- Einleitung in das System der christlichen Lehre (2d ed., Stuttgart 1870)
- Christliche Reden (1834-1870)
- Erklärung der zwei Briefe Pauli an Timotheus (1879)

=== English publications ===
- Outlines of Biblical Psychology (1877)
- Pastoral Theology of the New Testament (1885)
