= Heroldstatt =

- Municipality
- Coat of arms

- Location of Heroldstatt within Alb-Donau-Kreis district
- Interactive map of Heroldstatt
- Location within Germany Location within Baden-Württemberg
- Coordinates: 48°26′47″N 9°40′18″E
- Country: Germany
- State: Baden-Württemberg
- Admin. region: Tübingen
- District: Alb-Donau-Kreis
- Subdivisions: 2

Government
  - Mayor (2018–26): Michael Weber

Area
  - Total: 21.81 km^{2} (8.42 sq mi)
- Elevation: 770 m (2,530 ft)

Population (2025-12-31)
  - Total: 2,903
  - Density: 133.1/km^{2} (344.7/sq mi)
- Time zone: UTC+01:00 (CET)
  - Summer (DST): UTC+02:00 (CEST)
- Postal codes: 72535
- Dialling codes: 07389
- Vehicle registration: UL
- Website: www.heroldstatt.de

Heroldstatt is a village in the district of Alb-Donau in Baden-Württemberg in Germany.

== Geography ==
Heroldstatt is located on the Swabian Jura about 25 kilometers west of Ulm.

== Neighboring communities ==
The municipality borders in the north and east to the town of Laichingen, in the southeast to the town of Blaubeuren, in the south to the town of Schelklingen (all Alb-Donau-district) and in the west to Gutsbezirk Münsingen (district Reutlingen).

== Municipality arrangement ==
The municipality consists of the two districts Ennabeuren and Sontheim and the allotment Breithülen.

== History ==
=== Ennabeuren ===
A documentary mention was made in 1092 to a nobleman Egilolf Oninburrin. In 1806, the village had around 300 Protestant and 200 Catholic residents. Ennabeuren lost in 1895 and 1938 a total of 940 hectares - about half of the municipal area - to the military training area Münsingen.

=== Sontheim ===
During the Reformation the village received in 1537 its own parish. By 1800 it had about 420 inhabitants.

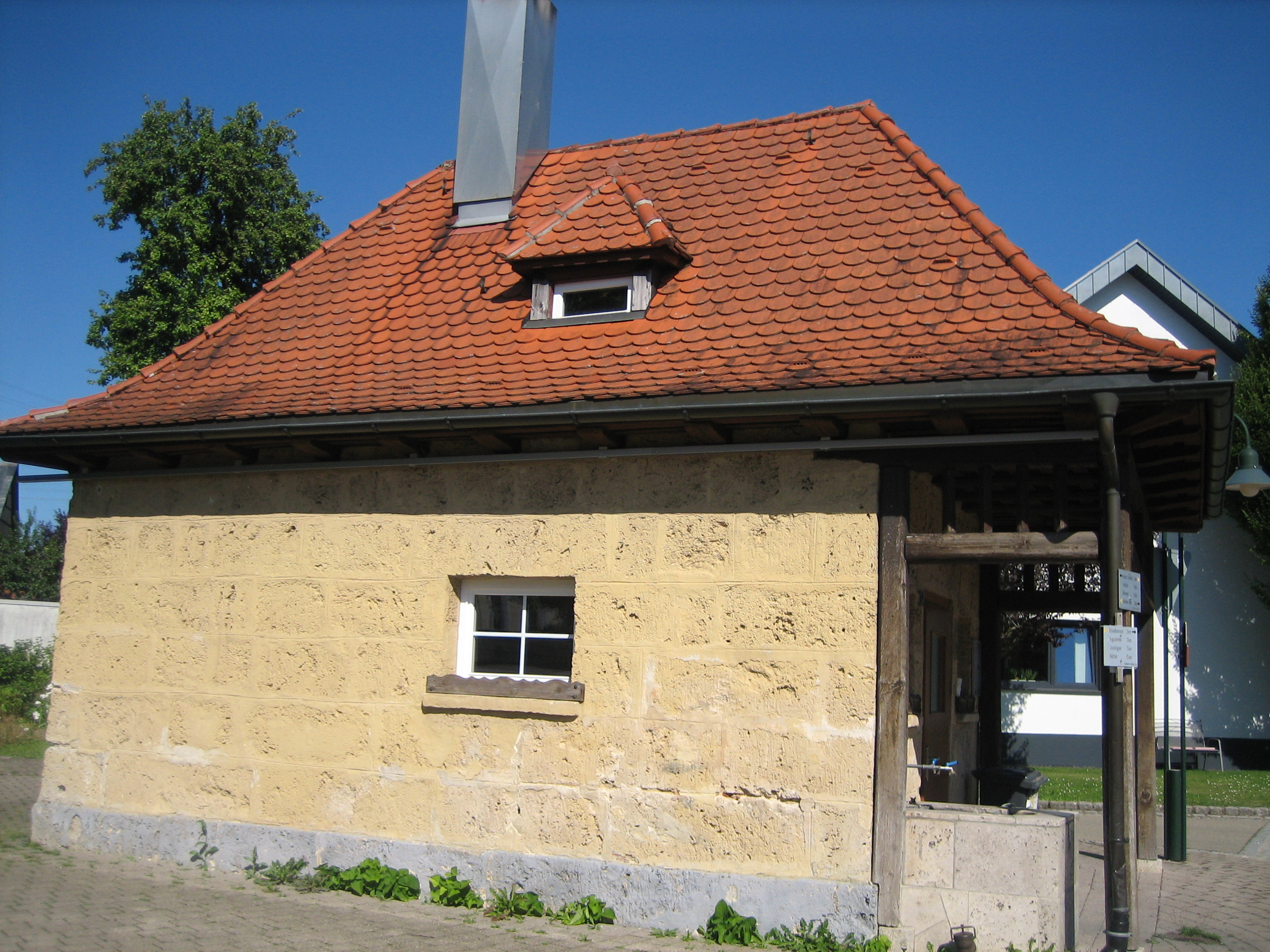
Bake house - Backhaus Sontheim Heroldstatt Alb-Donau-Kreis

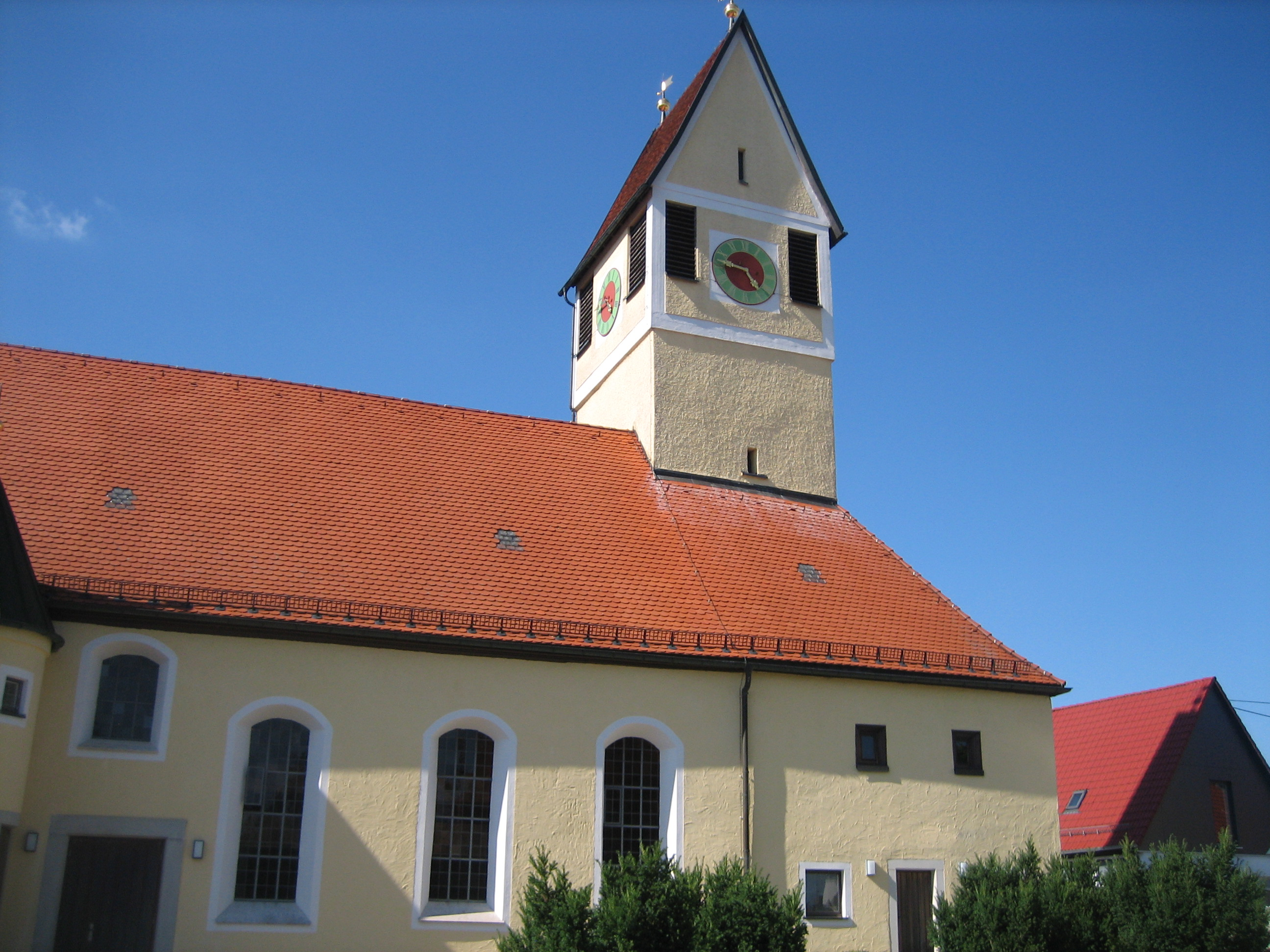
Peter- und Paulskirche Sontheim Heroldstatt Alb-Donau-Kreis

=== Heroldstatt ===
The two previously independent municipalities joined as part of the municipal reform on October 1, 1973, together. About halfway between the village centers a new community center with the mountain hall (multi-purpose hall, 1984, extended in 2000) and the town hall (1987) was erected.

=== Breithülen ===
The 77.5 hectare and 64 inhabitants allotment Breithülen was incorporated to Heroldstatt on January 1, 2011.

== Lookout ==
- The 30 m high Heroldstatt tower is about 2 kilometers northwest of the district Ennabeuren on the former military training area Münsingen and was built in 1981. The tower of the Schwäbischer Albverein is freely accessible (key deposit).

== Wind power test field ==
Northeast of the town there is a testing ground for Wind turbines. To this belongs a 1989 erected Enercon E-17 with 28 m hub height, 17 m rotor diameter and 80 kW power and a 25 m high Darrieus rotor with 15 m diameter which has an output of 55 kW.

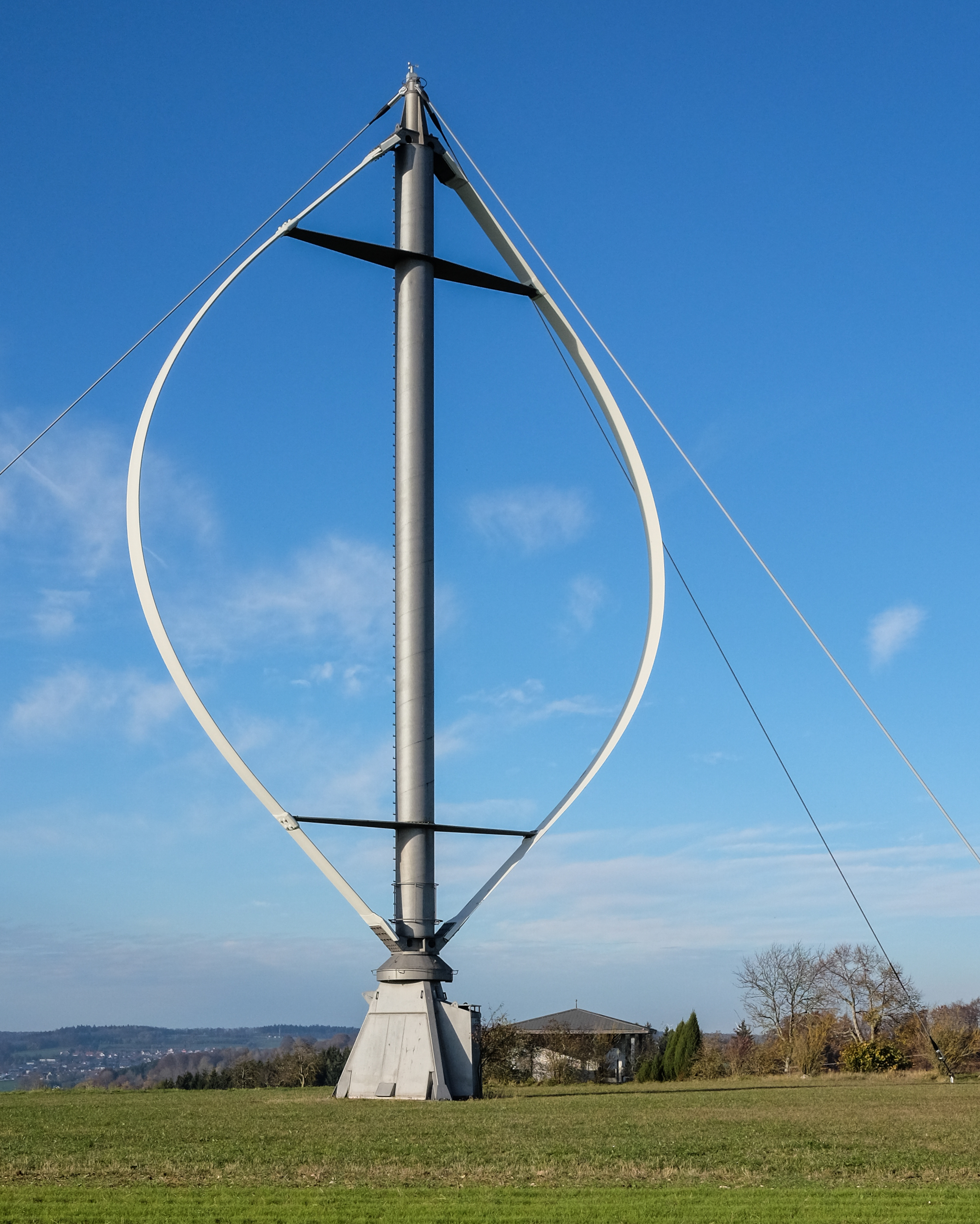
Darrieus-Rotor Ennabeuren

== Natural monuments ==
- Sontheimer Höhle, the oldest show cave in Germany
- Hintere Kohlhaldenhöhle

== Literatur ==
- Der Alb-Donau-Kreis. Amtliche Kreisbeschreibung, Band 2, Landesarchivdirektion Baden-Württemberg (Hrsg.), Sigmaringen 1992, ISBN 3-7995-1351-5, S. 307–328
- Karl Schnizer: Reformationsgeschichte von Enabeuren O. A. Münsingen. In: Blätter für württembergische Kirchengeschichte. N. F., 11. Jg. 1907, S. 62–68 (Digitalisat)
