= Marx Weiß =

German painter (c. 1518–1580)

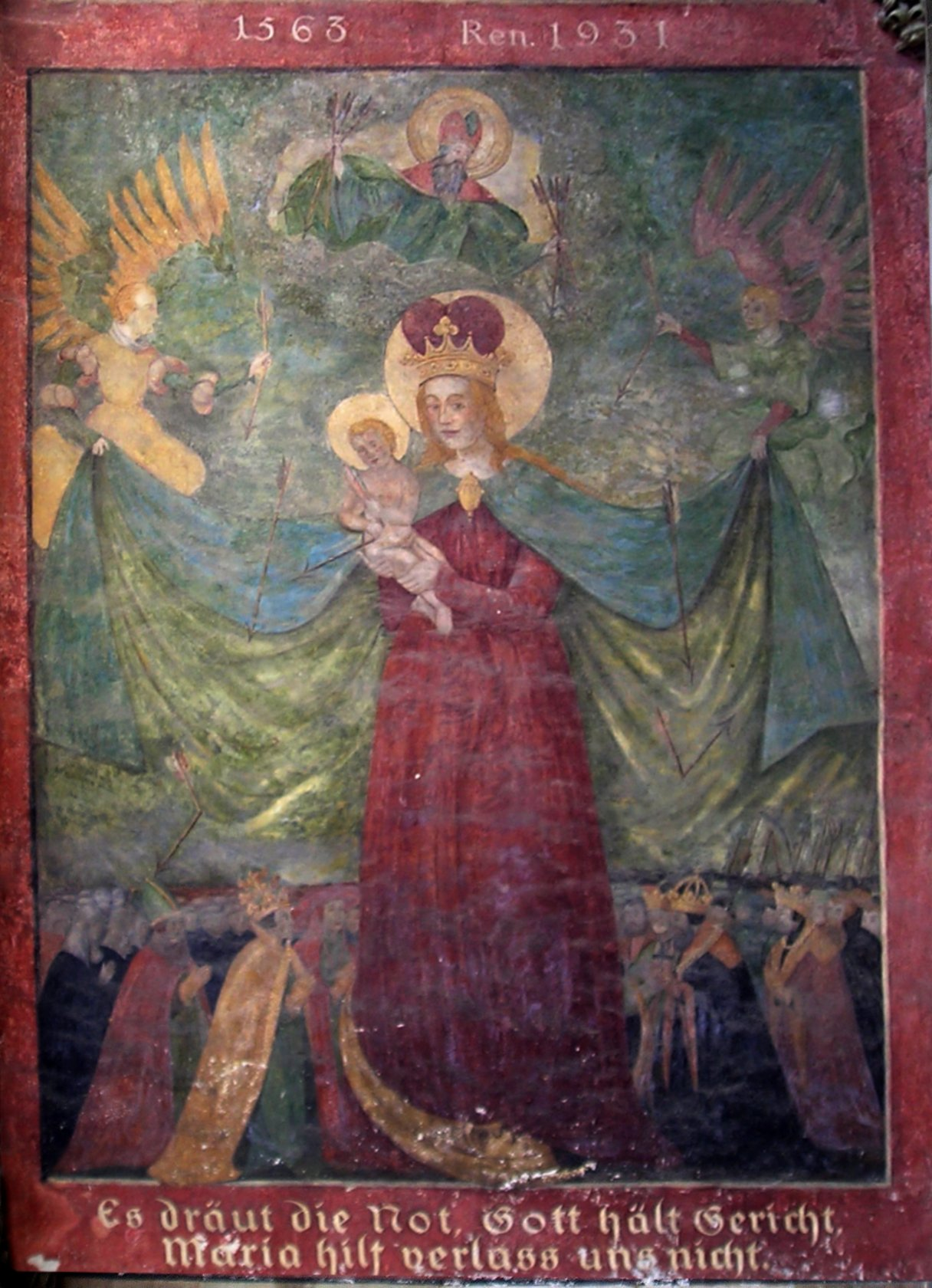
Virgin of Mercy (German:Schutzmantelmadonna), 1563

Marx Weiß the Younger (c. 1518 - 25 February 1580; also known as Marx Weiß of Balingen) was a late Gothic German painter. He was born in Balingen, the son of painter Marx Weiß the Elder, and the brother of painter Joseph Weiß. He died in Überlingen.
