= Balingen =

- Town
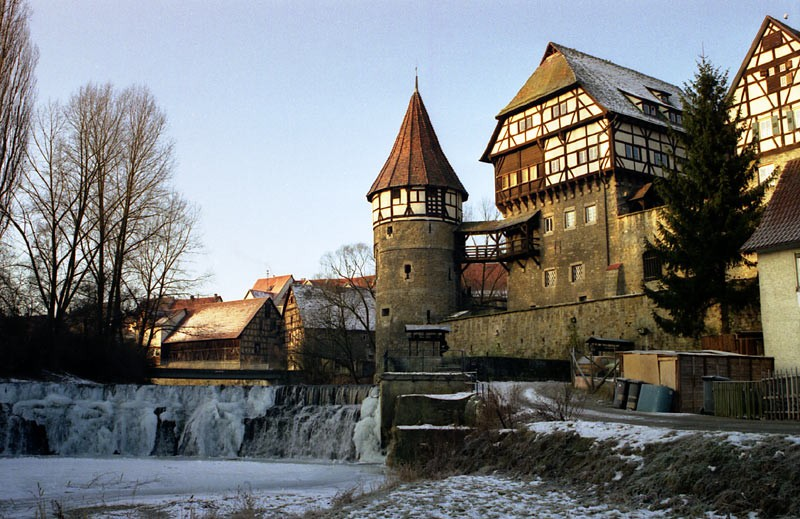
- Zollernschloss in Balingen

- Coat of arms

- Location of Balingen within Zollernalbkreis district
- Interactive map of Balingen
- Location within Germany Location within Baden-Württemberg
- Coordinates: 48°16′23″N 08°51′02″E
- Country: Germany
- State: Baden-Württemberg
- Admin. region: Tübingen
- District: Zollernalbkreis

Government
  - Mayor (2023–31): Dirk Abel (CDU)

Area
  - Total: 90.32 km^{2} (34.87 sq mi)
- Elevation: 517 m (1,696 ft)

Population (2025-12-31)
  - Total: 35,744
  - Density: 395.7/km^{2} (1,025/sq mi)
- Time zone: UTC+01:00 (CET)
  - Summer (DST): UTC+02:00 (CEST)
- Postal codes: 72301–72336
- Dialling codes: 07433
- Vehicle registration: BL
- Website: www.balingen.de

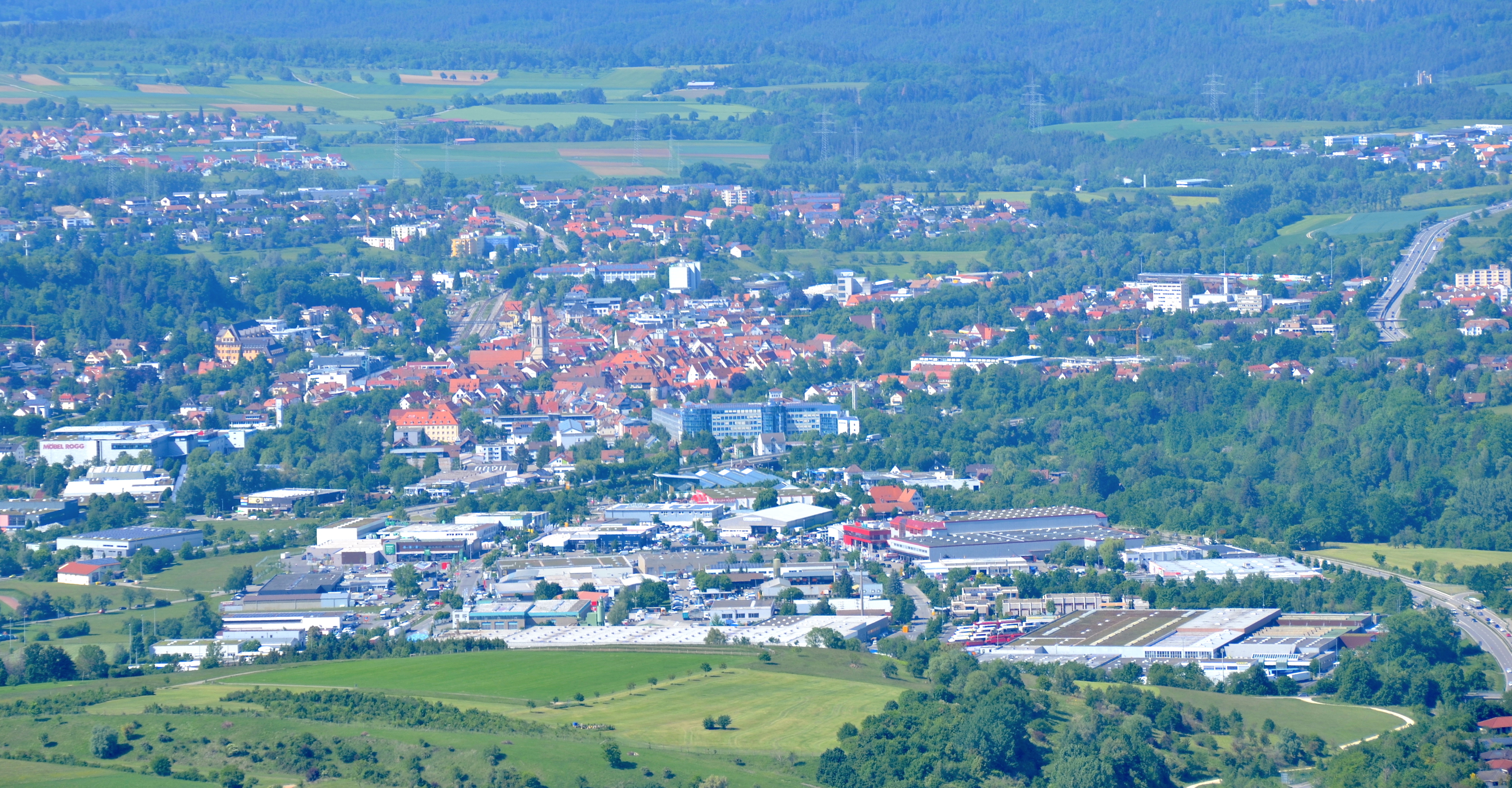
Balingen with Industrial Area Gehrn in the foreground

Balingen (German pronunciation: [ˈbaːlɪŋən]; Swabian: Balenga) is a town in Baden-Württemberg, Germany, capital of the district of Zollernalbkreis. It is located near the Swabian Jura, approximately 35 km to the south of Tübingen, 35 km northeast of Villingen-Schwenningen, and 70 km south southwest of Stuttgart.

Balingen is the second largest town in the Zollernalb district after Albstadt. It is a medium-sized center for the surrounding municipalities and was named a large district town in 1974. The town of Balingen has undergone dynamic development since 1945. The town, officially designated a "Große Kreisstadt" (large district town) since January 1, 1974, has entered into an administrative partnership with the neighboring town of Geislingen.

Balingen is home to the Bizerba and Ideal companies.

== History ==
Balingen is first mentioned in 863. Initially a possession of the lords of Haigerloch, in 1162 Balingen was acquired by the count of Hohenberg. In the 13th century it received the title of city from Friedrich der Erlauchte, it was largely rebuilt on the left bank of the river Eyach.

The earliest signs of settlement in what is now the town area are the Alemannic terraced graves. However, Balingen did not initially serve as the town's center; according to historical records, it was established in 1255 by Count Friedrich von Zollern. The town was fortified before 1377.

In 1403 it was sold to the County of Württemberg, whose chancellor maintained a residence there until the 18th century. When the entire territory was sold to Württemberg, it led to the establishment of the administrative district known as "Amt Balingen." A legal officer took up residence in the official town, specifically in the castle built in 1372, and remained there until the mid-18th century. In 1973, Balingen became the seat of the newly formed district of Zollernalb, not least as a continuation of the old official town tradition.

Zollernschloss Balingen: The foundation walls of Zollern Castle in Balingen date back to the 13th century. Initially, it was a typical late medieval town castle designed for residential use. In 1403, the castle and the entire Schalksburg estate were acquired by Württemberg, where it was used as the official residence of the head bailiff. Following the Thirty Years' War, the castle was left in a state of disrepair, and it was not until spring 1651 that the new head bailiff, Count von Kandel, could take up residence after necessary renovations were completed. In 1403, the castle and the entire Schalksburg estate came to Württemberg and was used as the seat of the head bailiff.

Balingen has faced a challenging history marked by different devastating fires. As early as 1286, chroniclers tell that the town, which was only three decades old at the time, was engulfed in flames during a feud between the Zollern and Hohenberg families. Subsequent fires in 1546, 1607, 1672, 1724, and 1809 added to the town's sufferings, with the last blaze leaving only 55 out of 445 buildings standing. The fire in 1809 was particularly devastating, as it wiped out nearly the entire town. The efforts to rebuild after these disasters gave rise to the classicist character of the city.

The existence of a hospital in the 15th century was a clear reflection of the community spirit in the town. The Balingen Hospital was established in 1489 by a civic foundation to care for the poor and the elderly. Initially located just behind the town church, it later moved to the upper suburbs. This social institution served the community until the 20th century.

Balingen became part of the unified Germany in 1870.

During the Second World War (1939-1945) Balingen was the site of a sub-camp of the German death camp of Natzweiler-Struthof in the occupied French region of Alsace. After the war this camp became a French internment camp for former Nazi war criminals, the Camp d’internement de Wurtemberg.

== Main sights ==
The town features the Zollern Castle, which is nestled alongside the historic tanners' district, often referred to as "Little Venice." The castle was reconstructed in 1935.

The city was destroyed by a fire in 1809, from which only the Protestant church, the castle and a few other edifices escaped. The Protestant church's construction finished in 1541; it has a characteristic sundial in the apse.

== Sulfur spring ==
In Balingen, there is the enclosed, publicly accessible sulfur spring, whose water is said to have healing powers and support the immune system. As with the medicinal springs in Bad Sebastiansweiler, the spring is made up of dissolved, sulfur-containing sodium hydrogen carbonate (Na-HCO3) from the rock (Black Jura). When the rock containing pyrites (pyrite) is weathered, the oxidation of the pyrite with subsequent bacterial reduction of the sulfate ion produces hydrogen sulfide (H_{2}S ). It gives the mineral water the smell of rotten eggs. It contains dissolved substances and hydrogen sulfide. Visitors who regularly drink from it should note that the daily intake of hydrogen sulfide does not exceed the limit of 100 mg.

== Nickname ==
=== World Capital ===
Balingen is nicknamed "Waagenstadt", the metropolis of scales. The father Philipp Matthäus Hahn behind the original idea.

Frommern is nicknamed "Möbelstadt", the metropolis of furniture in the time of Wirtschaftswunder. In Frommern a line of high polished industrial production ( fine veneered wood) take up the ideas of the royal Hofebenist. In the Haus der Volkskunstof the Schwäbischer Albverein the traditional Himmelbett is use as a hotel bed.

== Notable people ==
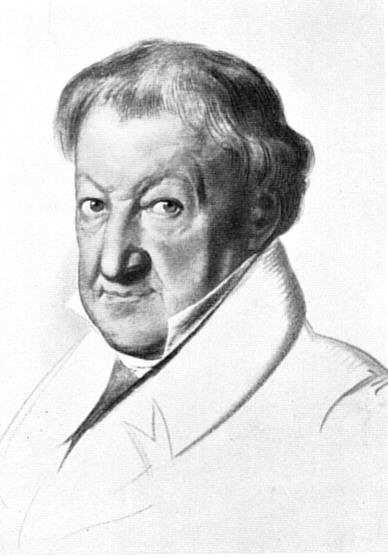
Karl Friedrich Reinhard

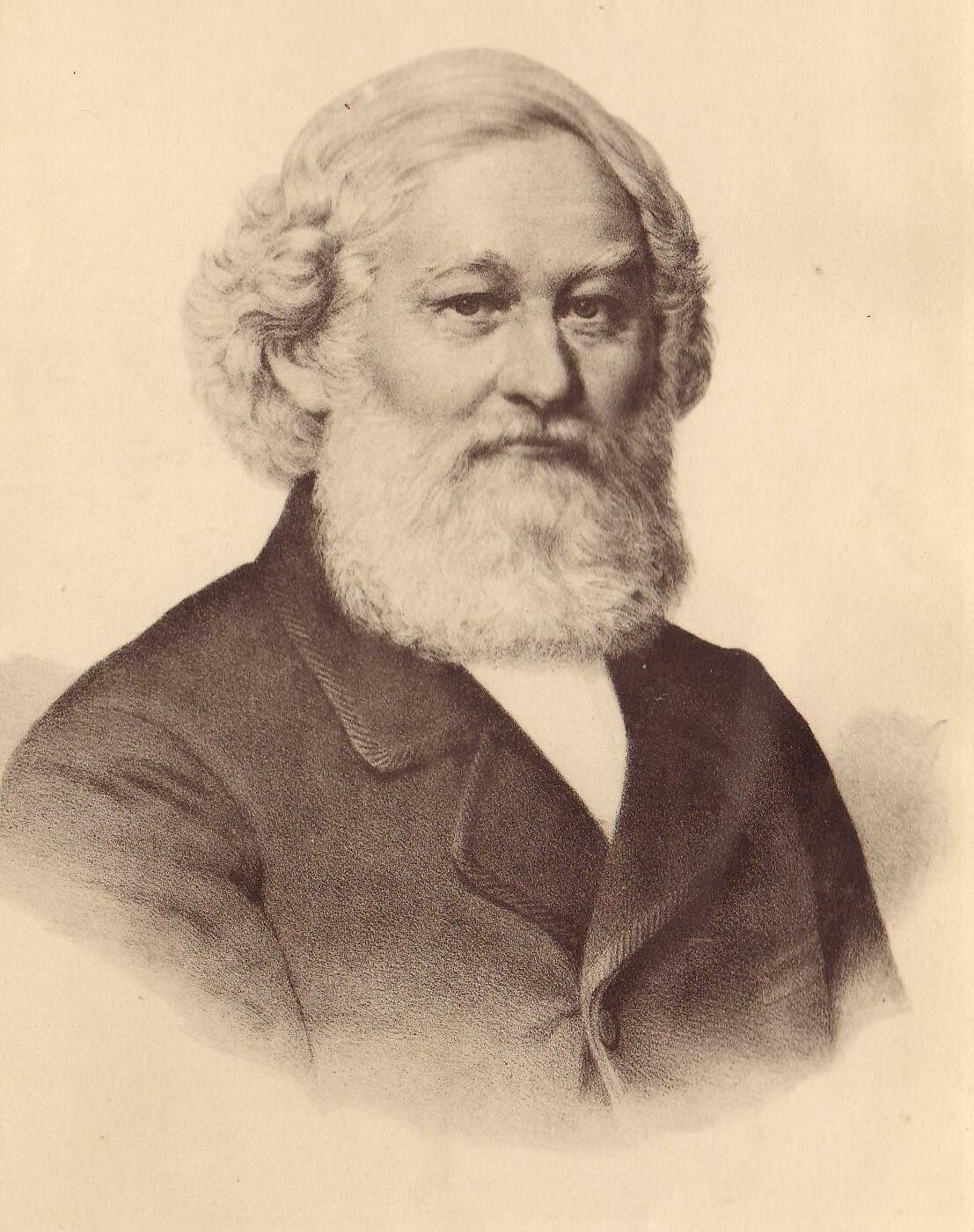
Johann Tobias Beck

- Gregor Reisch (ca.1467–1525), Carthusian monk and humanist, produced encyclopedia of general knowledge.
- Joseph Weiß (c. 1487–1565), local Renaissance painter, may be the Master of Meßkirch
- Hans Maurer, (DE Wiki) (1490–1525), Lutherean priest, arrested at the Church of Balingen, prisoner in the tower of Balingen
- Marx Weiß (c. 1518–1580), the Younger, also Marx White from Balingen , painter of Late Gothic
- Philipp Nicodemus Frischlin (1547–1590), philologist, poet, playwright, mathematician, and astronomer.
- Karl Friedrich Reinhard (1761–1837), French diplomat, statesman and writer, partly grew up locally
- Johann Tobias Beck (1804–1878), Protestant theologian.
- Heinrich Lang (1826–1876), Protestant theologian
- Martin Haug (1827–1876), orientalist, professor of Sanskrit in Poona.
- Andreas Bizer (1839–1914), mechanic and industrialist, co-founder of Bizerba
- Robert Wahl, (DE Wiki) (1882–1955), entrepreneur and local politician
- Heinrich Haasis, (DE Wiki) (born 1945), mayor, Member of Parliament, President of the German Savings Bank Association (2006–2012)
- Joachim Schmid (born 1955), artist who has worked with found photography
- Michael Hennrich, (DE Wiki) (born 1965), politician (CDU), Member of Parliament
- Nicole Hoffmeister-Kraut (born 1972), politician (CDU)

=== Sport ===
- Martin Schaudt (born 1958), dressage rider, team gold medallist at the 1996 & 2004 Summer Olympics
- Kathrin Lang (born 1986), retired biathlete
- Frank Lehmann (born 1989), soccer goalkeeper, played over 260 games
- Pascal Bodmer (born 1991), ski jumper
- Florian Kath (born 1994), former football player, played 153 times

== Geography ==
=== Climate ===
Balingen has an oceanic climate (Köppen: Cfb).

Climate data for Balingen (Bronnhaupten 48°16′N 08°49′E) normals for 1991-2020
Month	Jan	Feb	Mar	Apr	May	Jun	Jul	Aug	Sep	Oct	Nov	Dec	Year
Daily mean °C (°F)	0.2 (32.4)	0.7 (33.3)	4.2 (39.6)	8.2 (46.8)	12.3 (54.1)	15.8 (60.4)	17.7 (63.9)	17.4 (63.3)	13.1 (55.6)	8.9 (48.0)	4.1 (39.4)	1.1 (34.0)	8.6 (47.6)
Average precipitation mm (inches)	51 (2.0)	48 (1.9)	54 (2.1)	58 (2.3)	96 (3.8)	89 (3.5)	101 (4.0)	82 (3.2)	60 (2.4)	67 (2.6)	60 (2.4)	62 (2.4)	828 (32.6)
Mean monthly sunshine hours	69	91	141	176	200	220	237	222	168	119	73	61	1,777
Source: Deutscher Wetterdienst

== Twin towns – sister cities ==
Balingen is twinned with:

- Royan, France

== Natural sport ==
- Trail mountainbike: Tieringen Albtrauf to Balingen-Weilstetten Lochenpass, 4,7 km, car road, bike trail, 1,9 km downhill.
