= Joseph Weiß =

German painter (1486/7–1565)

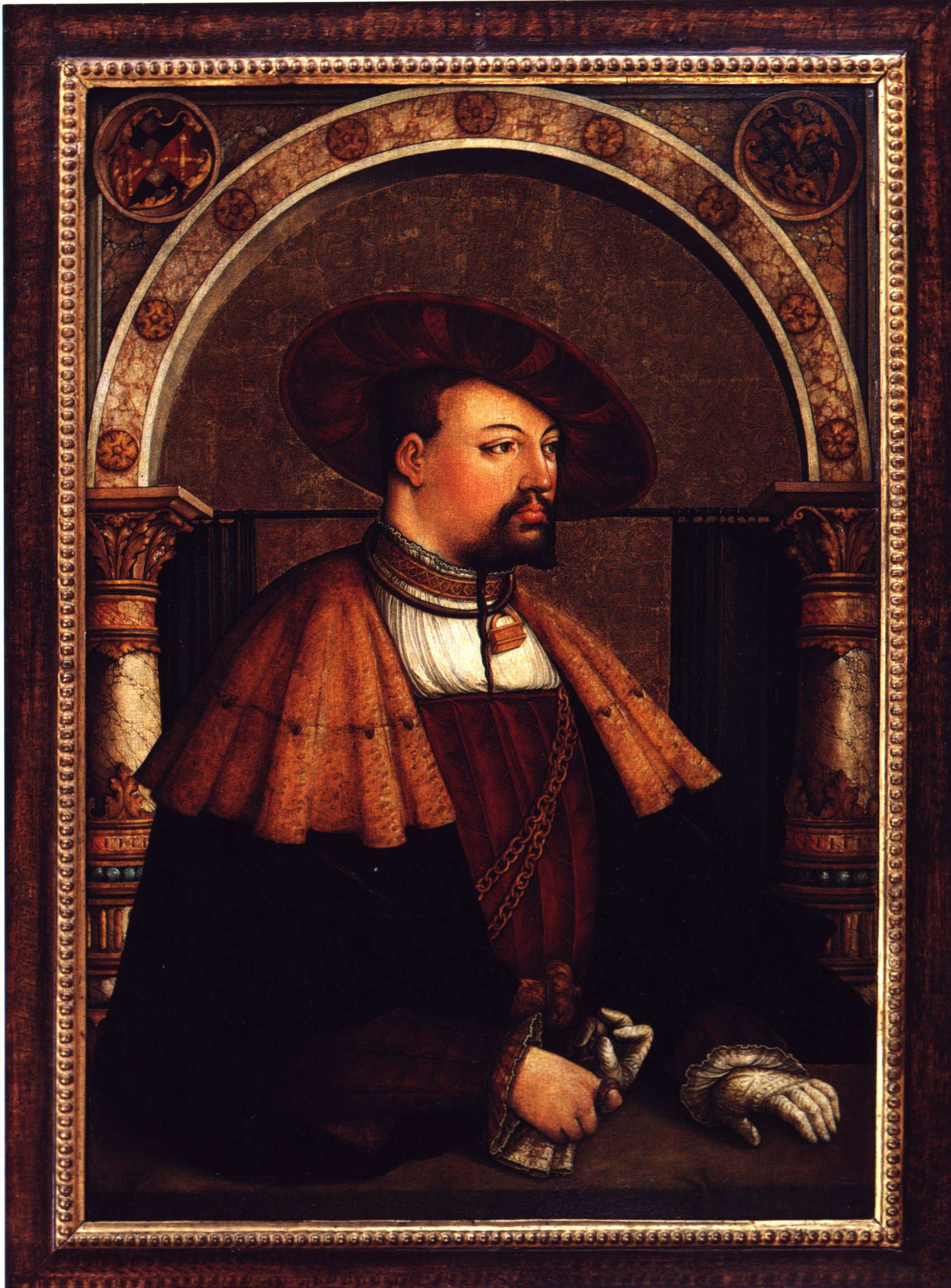
Eitel-Friedrich III. von Zollern, attributed to Joseph Weiß

Joseph Weiß (born 1486 or 1487; died 1565) was a German Renaissance painter.

Weiss was born and died in Balingen. He came from a family of painters: his father, Marx Weiß the Elder (died 1518), and brother, Marx Weiß the Younger, were also painters. It is possible that he is the true identity of the anonymous painter known as the Master of Meßkirch.
