= Schwäbischer Albverein =

The Schwäbischer Albverein e. V (Swabian Jura Association) (SAV) is one of the oldest hiking clubs in Germany. Based in Stuttgart, the society was founded on August 13, 1888, in Plochingen, Baden-Württemberg. Its territory extends far beyond the Swabian Jura north to the Tauber river and south to the Lake Constance, including the former territory of Württemberg except for the part of the Black Forest previously part of Württemberg (Calw and Freudenstadt). It is enrolled in the register of associations of the district court of Stuttgart (VR 2430).

The number of members grew rapidly, from 519 in 1889 to about 20,000 in 1897, 44,000 in 1926, 60,000 in 1955, and 100,000 in 1971. Today it is the largest German and European hiking club.

The association is a member of the German Hiking Association (Deutscher Wanderverband) and of the European Ramblers' Association. Since 1994, the group is a recognized conservation association.

== History ==
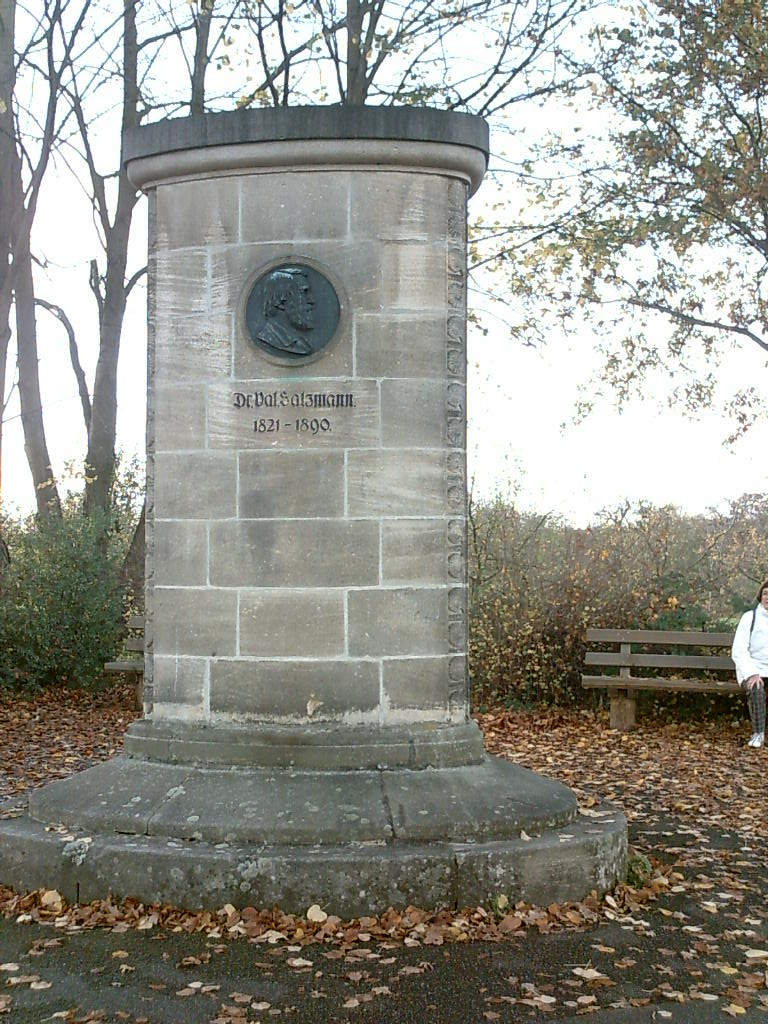
Valentin Salzmann memorial in Esslingen am Neckar

On August 13, 1888, at the invitation of Valentin Salzmann, the representatives of several beautification associations met in Plochingen with the aim of improving the work of the existing groups on the Albtrauf. At the inaugural meeting on November 12, 1888, in Plochingen Salzmann presented the first draft of the by-laws of the Albverein, which was inaugurated shortly thereafter. The first committee meeting took place on April 22, 1889. At the first general meeting of the Association on May 5, 1889, Salzmann was unanimously elected chairman, Ernst Camerer secretary and deputy chairman, Gustav Ströhmfeld treasurer, and Eugen Nägele editor.

== Structure ==
The association is divided into 22 "districts" (Gaue). They are responsible for overseeing the local groups in their area. At present the association has 570 local groups. The main office is located in Stuttgart.

== Goals ==
The association is not only dedicated to hiking, but above all to regional culture and all its riches. Its goal is to cultivate and preserve both the special and the everyday within its territory from the Taubergrund to Lake Constance and from the Black Forest to the Nördlinger Ries. These include the protection of nature and landscape as well as the care of language, music, dance and song. This results in rich hiking and events programs and many opportunities for recreation, relaxation and socializing.

An important goal is also the training of qualified hiking guides. For this purpose, the homeland and hiking academy Baden-Württemberg was founded in 2001. It is a joint project of the Swabian Albverein together with the Black Forest Association .

== Offerings ==
With their extensive hiking and events programs the local groups offer many opportunities for recreation, relaxation and socializing. Being a member of the Swabian Albverein does not just mean joining in a group with a trained hiking guide who knows how to tell about the ways, nature and culture, landscape history and buildings. In addition, the numerous hikes, annual meetings and hikes under the stars provide an opportunity for sociable walking and celebrating together. In addition, the Association offers training for expert hiking guides, conservationists or youth workers, lessons in folk music, folk dancing, flag waving and more.

== Observation towers ==
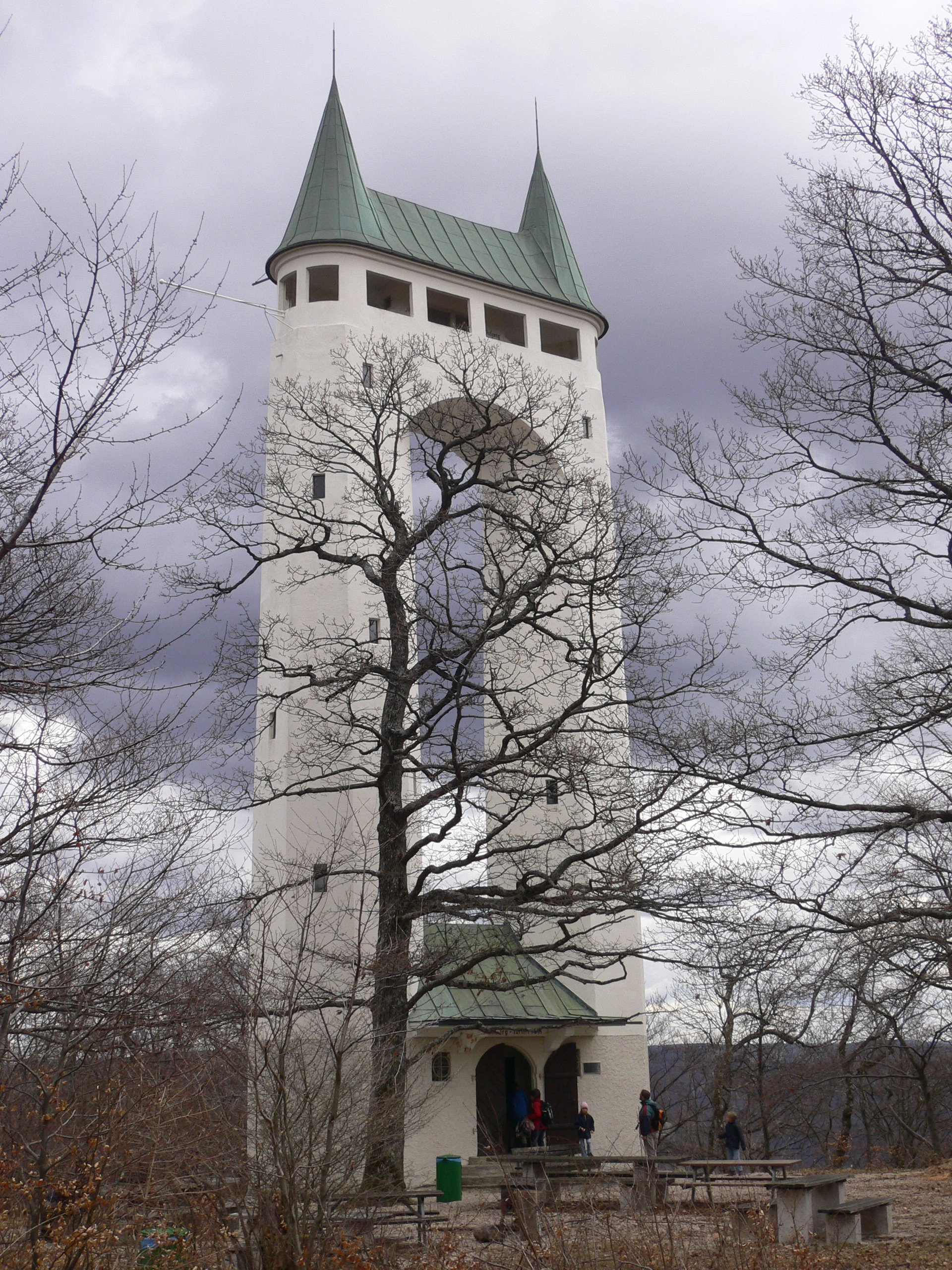
Schönbergturm near Pfullingen

The club operates a total of 29 observation towers on the Swabian Alb, but also in other areas of Baden-Württemberg, such as the Swabian-Franconian Forest and the Stromberg.

- Augstberg tower near Trochtelfingen-Steinhilben
- Bürgerturm in Neuenstein, Baden-Württemberg
- Burg Teck at Owen Baden-Württemberg
- Burgbergturm at Oberspeltach in Frankenhardt
- Eselsburgturm near Vaihingen-Ensingen
- Gansnestturm near Fridingen on the Danube
- Hagbergturm near Gschwend, Baden-Württemberg
- Heraldstatt tower at Heroldstatt
- Hohe Warte at St. Johann
- Hursch tower at Römerstein-Zainingen
- Jubiläumsturm in Plochingen
- Juxkopfturm at Spiegelberg-Jux
- Katharinenlindenturm near Esslingen am Neckar
- Kernenturm near Fellbach
- Lembergturm near Gosheim
- Lichtel Landturm near Creglingen
- Lupfenturm near Talheim
- Raichbergturm at Albstadt-Onstmettingen
- Römersteinturm at Römerstein-Donnstetten
- Roßbergturm at Reutlingen-Gönningen
- Schönbergturm near Pfullingen
- Schwarzer-Great-Turm at Isny im Allgäu
- Steinknickleturm at Wüstenrot-Neuhütten
- Sternbergturm near Gomadingen
- Uhlbergturm near Filderstadt-Plattenhardt
- Three observation towers in Gutsbezirk Münsingen
- Volkmarsbergturm near Oberkochen
- Waldgreutturm at Römerstein-Zainingen
- Zwei-Eichen tower (Two-oak tower) at Pliezhausen

== Hostels ==
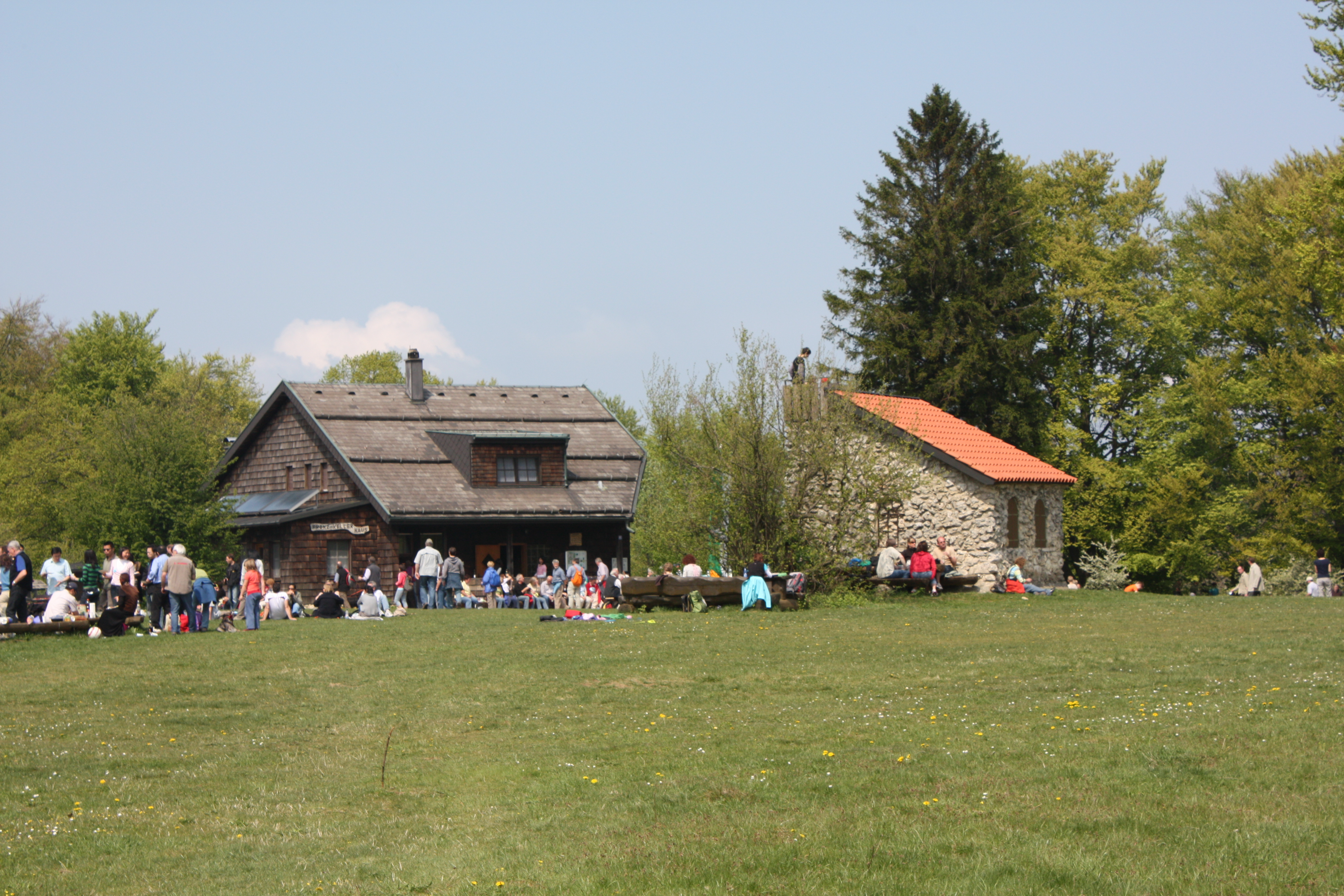
Franz Keller House hostel

The Association operates a total of 21 hostels with overnight accommodation, both on the Swabian Jura, and also in other areas of Baden-Württemberg. Most of them are staffed by local groups of volunteers on weekends and holidays; others are leased to a tenant.

=== Neckarland and Hohenlohe plain ===
- Weinsberg, vol. (216 m)
- Sulzdorf, vol. (382 m)

=== Keuperberge - Stromberg-Heuchelberg, Swabian-Franconian Forest ===
- Füllmenbacher Hof, vol. (305 m)
- Juxkopfhütte, vol. (533 m)
- Eschelhof, vol (492 m)

=== Eastern and Central Swabian Alb up to the line Echaz-Große Lauter ===
- Franz Keller House, vol. (781 m)
- Wasserberghaus, leased (700 m)
- Burg Teck, leased (775 m)
- Eninger Weide, leased (751 m)

=== Middle and southwestern Alb, west of the Echaz-Grosse Lauter line ===
- Roßberghaus, leased (869 m)
- Sternberg, vol. (844 m)
- Nägelehaus, leased (956 m)
- Fuchsfarm Youth Center, vol. (920 m)
- House of Folk Art, (570 m)
- Lochenhütte, vol. (963 m)
- Nusplinger Hütte, vol. (890 m)

=== On or near the southern edge of the Swabian Alb and south of the Danube ===
- Pfannentalhaus, leased (440 m)
- Weidacher Hütte, vol. (632 m)
- Farrenstall, vol. (685 m)
- Castle Derneck, vol. (655 m)
- Wanderheim Friedberg, vol. (614 m)
- Rauher Stein, leased (786 m)

== Trails ==
The Association maintains a network of hiking trails with a total length of over 20,000 kilometres (12,000 mi). In addition to numerous local hiking trails, there are also ten main hiking trails that can take days or weeks to traverse:

- Hauptwanderweg 1, the Schwäbische-Alb-Nordrand-Weg, Donauwörth - Tuttlingen, length 365 kilometres (227 mi)
- Hauptwanderweg 2, the Swabian-Alb-Südrand-Weg, Donauwörth-Tuttlingen, length 256 kilometres (159 mi)
- Hauptwanderweg 3, the Main-Neckar-Rhein-Weg, Wertheim-Lörrach, length 540 kilometres (340 mi) (support services available between Villingen-Schwenningen and Lörrach provided by the Schwarzwaldverein)
- Hauptwanderweg 4, the Main-Donau-Bodensee-Weg, Würzburg-Friedrichshafen, length 420 kilometres (260 mi)
- Hauptwanderweg 5, the Schwarzwald-Schwäbische-Alb-Allgäu-Weg, Pforzheim-Schwarzer Great, length 320 kilometres (200 mi)
- Hauptwanderweg 6, the Limes-Wanderweg, Miltenberg - Wilburgstetten, length 245 kilometres (152 mi)
- Hauptwanderweg 7, the Schwäbische-Alb-Oberschwaben-Weg, Lorch-Friedrichshafen, length 240 km
- Hauptwanderweg 8, the Frankenweg, Pforzheim-Rothenburg ob der Tauber, length 220 kilometres (140 mi)
- Hauptwanderweg 9, the Heuberg-Allgäu-Weg, Spaichingen-Schwarzer Great, length 185 kilometres (115 mi)
- Hauptwanderweg 10, the Stromberg-Schwäbischer-Wald-Weg, Pforzheim-Lorch, length 170 kilometres (110 mi)

In addition, the Swabian Jura Association maintains the following long-distance trails:

- Georg-Fahrbach-Weg, Criesbach-Stuttgart-Uhlbach, length 130 kilometres (81 mi)
- Württemberg wine trail, Aub-Esslingen am Neckar, length 470 kilometres (290 mi)

== Song ==
On official occasions and celebrations of the club is the Albvereinslied sung: "Nun steckt dies Zeichen an den Hut, ihr Albvereinsgenossen“. The lyrics were written by founding member Eugen Nägele and were published in June 1890 in the "Blättern des Schwäbischen Albvereinsn". The song is sung to the melody of the Frankenlied by Valentin Eduard Becker.

== Schwäbischer Albverein Press ==
The publishing house of the Schwäbischer Albverein has published literature on the Swabian Jura and adjoining regions since 1893, in addition to hiking guides and maps, they also publish material on history, geology, flora and fauna, nature conservation, folk art, songs and dialect. Besides individual titles, the Press currently publishes the series Natur – Heimat – Wandern, published since 1977 as well as hiking maps in the scale 1: 35,000 since 2003, and since 2017 also in the scale 1: 25,000. In addition, the association is also involved in cooperation on titles with other publishers, including hiking and leisure maps of the State Office for Geoinformation and Land Development Baden-Württemberg and the Swabian Heimatkalender. The Press is a member of the Börsenverein des Deutschen Buchhandels and the Landesverband Baden-Württemberg des Börsenvereins.

== Journal of the Schwäbischer Albverein ==
The Blätter des Schwäbischen Albvereins, since their first issue on 12 May 1889, has published information about the activities of the association and provided a forum for material on local and national history. Albverein members receive the magazine for free, but it can also be subscribed to by non-members. Issues of the journal appear quarterly in an edition of 70,000 copies. In a digital archive, all issues from 1889 to today are available free of charge.

== Schwäbische Albvereinsjugend ==
The Schwäbische Albvereinsjugend (Swabian Albverein Youth) is a member of the Deutsche Wanderjugend, and is the youth organization of the association. It was founded in 1926 and has over 13,000 members and about 150 local children's and youth groups.

Like the main club, the Albvereinsjugend is divided into districts and local groups. The highest body is the Jugendvertreterversammlung (youth representatives' meeting), which meets three times a year. A full-time office in Stuttgart oversees the activities of the members in the territory of the association

The Albvereinsjugend offers open youth work, and further education and recreation at club level and in the local groups.

Four mission statements shape the identity of the Albvereinsjugend: traveling together, nature and environmental protection, social and democratic action, between tradition and modernity.

The central journal Stufe appears four times a year. The club's youth center Fuchsfarm is located on the Raichberg near Albstadt-Onstmettingen on the Swabian Jura, where since 1965 regular camps for young people are organized. In 2006, the Albvereinsjugend presented the board game Quer durch BaWü (cross through Baden-Württemberg) with various excursion and hiking destinations around the club area.

== Culture ==
Folk dance and culture archive is in a hostel in Balingen. In the Haus der Volkskunst, the traditional Himmelbett is used as a hotel bed.
