= Martin Haug =

German orientalist (1827–1876)

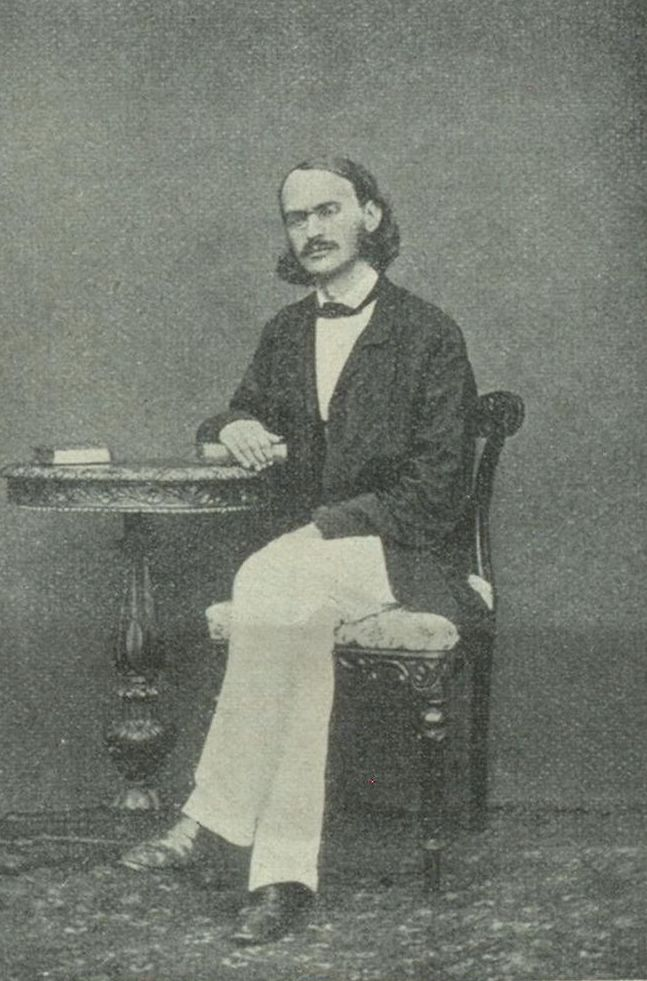
Haug

Martin Haug (30 January 1827 – 3 June 1876) was a German orientalist and philologist known for his theological works on Hinduism and Zoroastrianism.

== Biography ==
Haug was born at Ostdorf (today a part of Balingen), Württemberg. He became a pupil at the gymnasium in Stuttgart at a comparatively late age, and in 1848 he entered the University of Tübingen, where he studied oriental languages, especially Sanskrit. He afterwards attended lectures at the University of Göttingen, and in 1854 settled as Privatdozent at the University of Bonn. In 1856, he moved to Heidelberg University, where he assisted Bunsen in his literary undertakings.

In 1859, he accepted an invitation to India, where he became superintendent of Sanskrit studies and professor of Sanskrit in Poona. Here his acquaintance with the Zend language and literature afforded him excellent opportunities for extending his knowledge of this branch of literature. Having returned to Stuttgart in 1866, he was called to the Ludwig-Maximilians-Universität München as professor of Sanskrit and comparative philology in 1868.

It was Dr. Haug who originally outlined the structure of the popular Sanskrit introductory books by Bhandarkar which was used throughout India in the early 20th century.

Haug died in Bad Ragaz at the age of 49.

== Works ==
The result of his researches in Poona was the volume Essays on the sacred language, writings and religion of the Parsees (Bombay, 1862), of which a new edition, by E. W. West, greatly enriched from the posthumous papers of the author, appeared in 1878.

Haug published a number of other works of considerable importance to the student of the literatures of ancient India and Persia. They include:

- Die Pehlewisprache und der Bundehesch (1854)
- Die Schrift und Sprache der zweiten Keilschriftgattung (1855)
- Die fünf Gathas, edited, translated and expounded (1858–1860)
- an edition, with translation and explanation, of the Aitareya Brahmana of the Rigveda (Bombay, 1863), which is accounted his best work in the province of ancient Indian literature
- A Lecture on an original Speech of Zoroaster (1865)
- An old Zend-Pahlavi Glossery (1867)
- Über den Charakter der Pehlewisprache (1869)
- Das 18. Kapitel des Wendidad (1869)
- Über das Ardai-Virafnameh (1870)
- An old Pahlavi-Pazand Glossary (1870)
- Vedische Rätselfragen und Rätselsprüche (1875)
