= Heinrich Lang =

German Protestant pastor

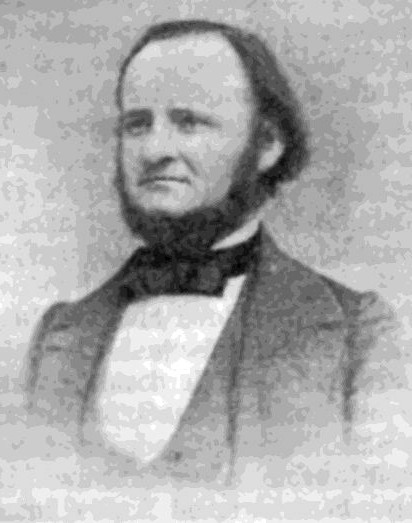
Heinrich Lang, 1826-1876

Heinrich Lang (born in Württemberg, 14 November 1826) was a German Protestant pastor who was well known for preaching that all were equal before God without class distinction.

== Early life and teaching ==
Although known for works in Switzerland, Lang grew up in the German state of Württemberg near Frommern. He was the eighth of ten children. In Frommern his father was a pastor and the ministry had been the family's occupation for generations. His father's teachings were highly influential, and from them Heinrich took his understanding of supernatural revelation, and his belief that all people are equal before God. Heinrich and his brothers were taught Latin by their father while preparing for divinity school.

Heinrich studied theology in Tübingen, where he was influenced by Ferdinand Christian Baur. In 1840, he graduated from college with honors, continued his education, and began living in a Roman Catholic school where he taught.

In 1866, he was promoted and began teaching at a college and living at a monastery. He experienced bouts of melancholy while teaching mathematics, Latin, Greek, and Hebrew, but he said that he was reinvigorated by each new group of students.

=== Works and ministry ===
Lang's theology writings got him invited to the Saint Peter Church in Zürich, Switzerland as a pastor, where he served until his death.

In 1859, Lang became the editor of the Zeitstimmen für die reformierte Schweiz periodical, which was replaced by Reform in 1872. The Protestáns Society was formed in Hungary in 1860 as a result of Lang's ideas.

In 1863, he moved from the bank of Lake Zürich to Meilen. He was invited to the Saint Peter Church in Zürich as a pastor, where Lang served until his death.

He died in 1876.

== Works ==
- Versuch einer christlichen Dogmatik (2. ed. 1865);
- Ein Gang durch die Welt (2. ed. 1870);
- Religiöse Charaktere (2. ed. 1872);
- Stunden der Andacht (1862–65, 2 vol);
- Das Leben des Apostels Paulus (1866);
- Martin Luther (1870);

== Sources ==
- Pallas Nagy Lexikona
- Biedermann, Alois Emanuel (1876). Heinrich Lang. Schmidt.
