= Nellingen =

- Municipality
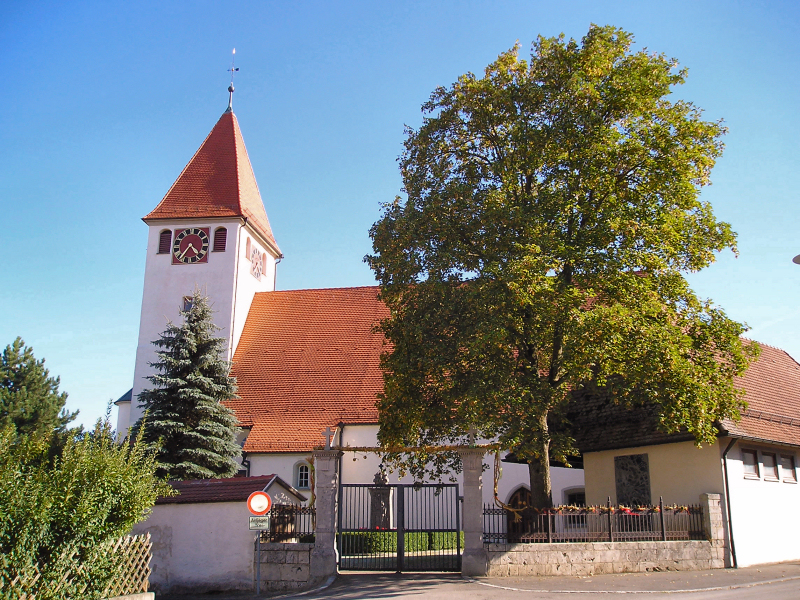

- Coat of arms

- Location of Nellingen within Alb-Donau-Kreis district
- Interactive map of Nellingen
- Location within Germany Location within Baden-Württemberg
- Coordinates: 48°32′31″N 9°47′29″E
- Country: Germany
- State: Baden-Württemberg
- Admin. region: Tübingen
- District: Alb-Donau-Kreis

Government
  - Mayor (2019–27): Christoph Jung

Area
  - Total: 35.78 km^{2} (13.81 sq mi)
- Elevation: 684 m (2,244 ft)

Population (2025-12-31)
  - Total: 2,056
  - Density: 57.46/km^{2} (148.8/sq mi)
- Time zone: UTC+01:00 (CET)
  - Summer (DST): UTC+02:00 (CEST)
- Postal codes: 89191
- Dialling codes: 07337
- Vehicle registration: UL
- Website: www.nellingen.de

Nellingen is a municipality in the Alb-Donau district, in Baden-Württemberg, Germany.

== Demographics ==
Population development:

Year	Inhabitants
1990	1.600
2001	1.800
2011	1.846
2021	2.058
