= CAS Corporation =

Korean electronics manufacturer

- Type: Public (캐스 주식 회사)
- Traded as: KRX: 016920:KS
- Genre: Electronic weighing equipment
- Founded: 1983, April 19th
- Founder: Dong Jin, Kim
- Headquarters: South Korea, Seoul
- Area served: 125 countries (among others: United States, Canada, Great Britain, Germany, Poland, Russia, Turkey, Bangladesh, Vietnam, China, Japan)
- Key people: Dong Jin, Kim (Chairman and CEO)
- Products: List: Electronic scales and accessories Load cells Other weighing equipment for industry and commerce
- Revenue: $82.8 million (2009)
- Number of employees: 282 in Korea and 367 abroad (2006)
- Website: www.cas.co.kr, www.globalcas.com

CAS Corporation is a Korean manufacturer of electronic weighing equipment, founded on April 19, 1983, by its current Chief Executive Manager, Dong-Jin Kim.

CAS has been continuously developing over the years and by 2006, its equipment was exported to over 120 countries. By 2011, the company had representatives in Germany, USA, Canada, Poland, Vietnam, Bangladesh, India, China, Japan, Russia, Turkey, Great Britain and other countries. Its equipment has been certified and approved for commercial use, among others, in USA, Canada, Russia, European Union (OIML), Australia, Japan.

CAS was the first Korean company to export electronic scales in 1987 and to develop a label printing scale in 1992 (model LP, which was an abbreviation for label printing).
