= Bizerba =

Weighing scale manufacturer

Bizerba SE & Co. KG
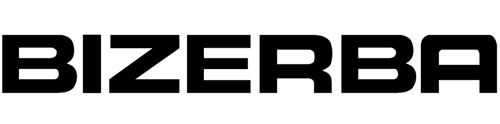
- Industry: Food processing
- Founded: 1866
- Headquarters: Balingen, Germany
- Area served: International
- Key people: Andreas Wilhelm Kraut (Managing Director)
- Products: Retail scales, slicers, logistics systems, labels, checkweighers
- Revenue: €729 million (2018)
- Number of employees: 4302 (2021)
- Website: www.bizerba.com

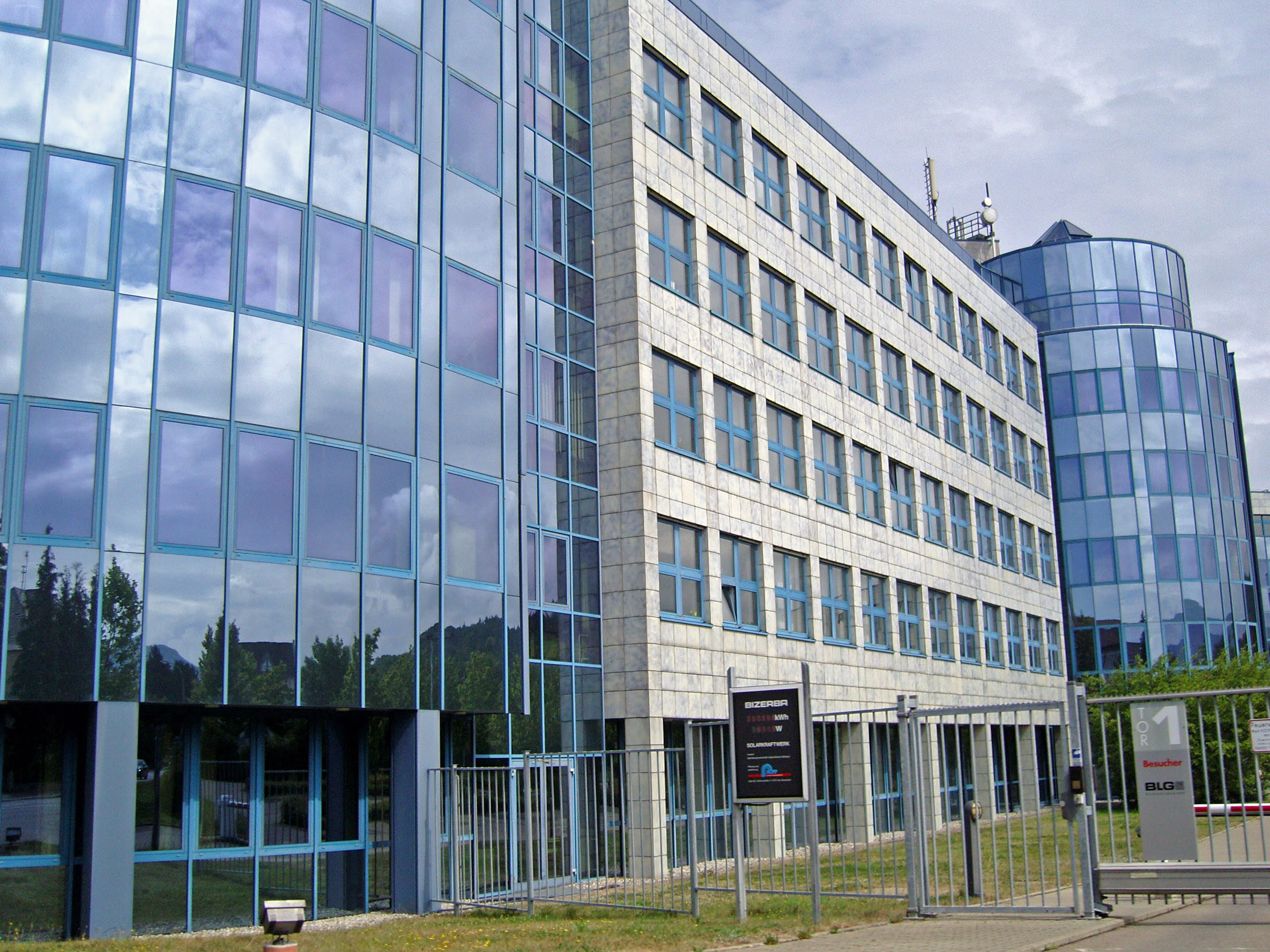
Bizerba headquarters in Balingen, Germany

Bizerba SE & Co. KG is a German provider of weighing and slicing technologies for industry and trade and is a worldwide leading specialist in industrial weighing and labeling technologies.

It was founded in 1866 Andreas Bizer in Balingen. Its name is a composite of Bizer and the city's name. Bizerba currently has over 100 divisions worldwide and a headquarters located in Balingen, Germany.

Bizerba has approximately 4100 employees worldwide, including its headquarters and 3 production facilities in Germany as well as 41 subsidiaries and 69 national representatives.

Bizerba USA, Inc. has been incorporated in 1984 as a subsidiary of parent company Bizerba SE & Co. KG (Germany). Its corporate office is located in Joppa, MD, USA. Bizerba is working with factory authorized distributors in all 50 USA states and Puerto Rico. Bizerba Engineered Solutions is a new subsidiary located in Richmond USA.

== Milestones ==
Bizerba is known for pioneering some very important developments and achievements in the food industry

- 1866: Bizerba founded in Balingen, Germany by Andreas Bizer
- 1924: The world's first pendulum scale was patented by Bizerba
- 1930: First industrial scale worldwide was designed and produced by Bizerba. The numerical printing system and dial controls were technological marvels of their time.
- 1965: Bizerba brings electronics into retail shops. Now weight reporting against different product pricing structures was easier than ever.
- 2002: Bizerba introduces the first CE class touch screen scales that revolutionize scale management and updating.
- 2006: Bizerba introduces Optical Article Recognition Scale CE-H 800 SV
- 2007: First generation of modular checkweigher leave the factory
- 2010: The new Ceraclean surface finish is introduced to Bizerba slicers
- 2011: With the appointment of Andreas Wilhelm Kraut as Chairmen of the Executive Board (CEO) the family company Bizerba is again managed by a fifth generation shareholder
- 2012: Bizerba develops the KScalePad, which is a weighing counter board that serves as a weighing platform and work surface for hygienic cutting
- Dec-2015: Bizerba continues to expand its international network of sites. In November, the market-leading provider of solutions for weighing, slicing and labelling technology opened a branch in Singapore.
- Jan-2016: Bizerba bought back the company shares from the Zurich Deutscher Herold Lebensversicherung AG. After around 20 years, the company is now once again under the full ownership of the founding family Kraut.
- Feb-2016: Bizerba takes over the Italian company Mac & Label. With its head office in Cesena, the company is specialized in labeling applicators for the fruit and vegetable sector.
- Apr-2016: Bizerba recorded sales of 598.6 million euros and 19 percent growth in its fiscal year 2015 as a result of sales increases in all regions worldwide
- Apr-2018: Bizerba recorded sales of 677 million euros and 14 percent growth
- May-2021: Bizerba recorded sales of 729 million euros and 4 percent growth
