= Valentin Eduard Becker =

German composer (1814–1890)

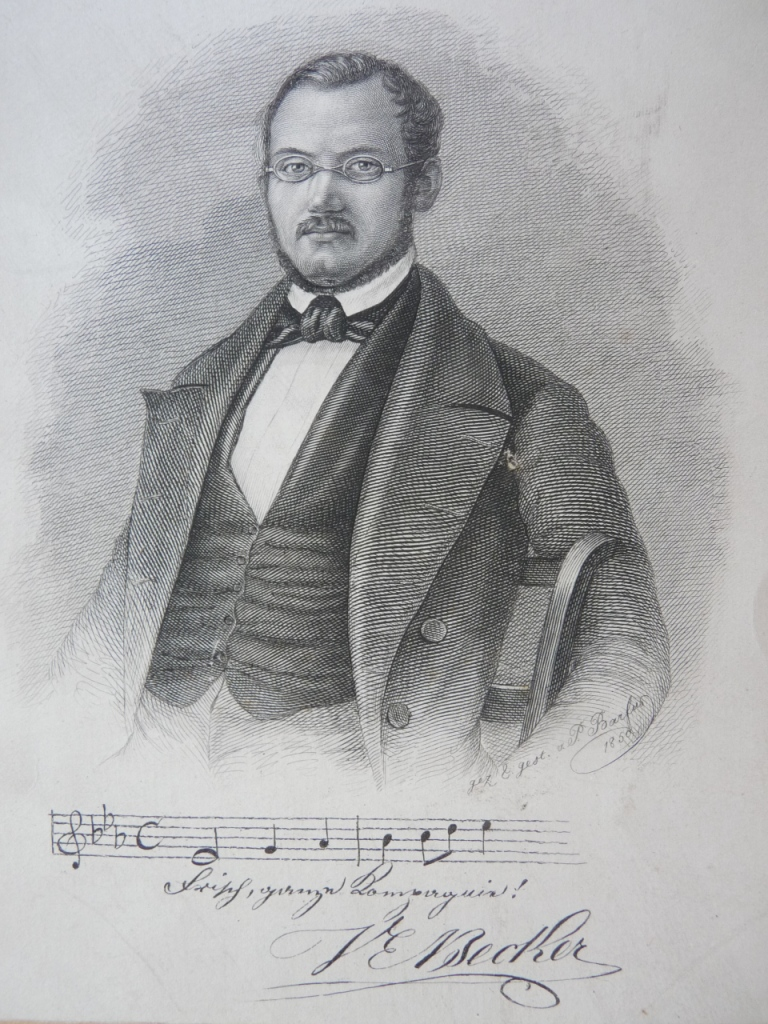
Valentin Eduard Becker.

Valentin Eduard Becker (20 November 1814 Würzburg – 25 January 1890 Würzburg) was a German composer.

== Biography ==
Becker became known as a composer in Würzburg for popular male choruses (Das Kirchlein and others). He also wrote several masses, an anthem (Frankenlied) and two operas, entitled Die Bergknappen and Der Deserteur.
