= Hypergammaglobulinemia =

Excess amounts of gamma globulin in the blood

- Specialty: Immunology, hematology

Hypergammaglobulinemia is a medical condition with elevated levels of gamma globulin. It is a type of immunoproliferative disorder.

== Types ==
Hypergammaglobulinemia is a condition that is characterized by the increased levels of a certain immunoglobulin in the blood serum. The name of the disorder refers to an excess of proteins after serum protein electrophoresis (found in the gammaglobulin region).

Most hypergammaglobulinemias are caused by an excess of immunoglobulin M (IgM), because this is the default immunoglobulin type prior to class switching. Some types of hypergammaglobulinemia are actually caused by a deficiency in the other major types of immunoglobulins, which are IgA, IgE and IgG.

There are 5 types of hypergammaglobulinemias associated with hyper IgM.

MeSH considers hyper IgM syndrome to be a form of dysgammaglobulinemia, not a form of hypergammaglobulinemia.

=== Type 1 ===
X-linked immunodeficiency with hyper–immunoglobulin M, which is also called type 1 hyper IgM, is a rare form of primary immunodeficiency disease caused by a mutation in the Tumor Necrosis Factor Super Family member 5 (TNFSF5) gene, which codes for CD40 ligand. This gene is located on the long arm of the X chromosome at position 26, denoted Xq26. Normally, CD40 ligand is expressed on activated T cells, and is necessary to induce immunoglobulin class switching from IgM to the other immunoglobulin types. It does this by binding to its ligand, CD40, which is found expressed on the surface of B cells. The mutation in the TNFSF5 gene causes there to be no recognition of CD40 by CD40 ligand, and thus the T cells do not induce Ig class switching in B cells, so there are markedly reduced levels of IgG, IgA, and IgE, but have normal or elevated levels of IgM. CD40 ligand is also required in the functional maturation of T lymphocytes and macrophages, so patients with this disorder have a variable defect in T-lymphocyte and macrophage effector function, as well as hyper IgM.

=== Type 2 ===
Immunodeficiency with hyper IgM type 2 is caused by a mutation in the Activation-Induced Cytidine Deaminase (AICDA) gene, which is located on the short arm of chromosome 12. The protein that is encoded by this gene is called Activation-Induced Cytidine Deaminase (AICDA) and functions as a DNA-editing deaminase that induces somatic hypermutation, class switch recombination, and immunoglobulin gene conversion in B cells. When a person is homozygous for the mutation in the AICDA gene, the protein fails to function, and thus somatic hypermutation, class switch recombination, and immunoglobulin gene conversion cannot occur, which creates an excess of IgM.

=== Type 3 ===
Immunodeficiency with hyper IgM type 3 is caused by a mutation in the gene that codes for CD40. As mentioned above, CD40 is expressed on the surface of B cells, and its binding to CD40 ligand on activated T cells induces Ig class switching. When the mutation is present, there is no signal for B cells to undergo class switching, so there is an excess of IgM and little to no other immunoglobulin types produced.

=== Type 4 ===
Immunodeficiency with hyper IgM type 4 is poorly characterized. All that is known is that there is an excess of IgM in the blood, with normal levels of the other immunoglobulins. The exact cause is yet to be determined.

=== Type 5 ===
Immunodeficiency with hyper IgM type 5 is caused by a mutation in the Uracil-DNA glycosylase (UNG) gene, which, like AICDA, is located on chromosome 12. This codes for Uracil DNA Glycosylase, which is responsible for excising previous uracil bases that are due to cytosine deamination, or previous uracil misincorporation from double-stranded previous DNA substrates. This enzyme is also responsible for helping with gene conversion during somatic recombination in B cells. The mutation in the gene causes an enzyme that does not function properly, thus gene conversion does not proceed and class switching cannot occur.

== See also ==
- Monoclonal gammopathy of undetermined significance
