= Hyper-IgM syndrome type 5 =

Primary immune deficiency disorder

Hyper IgM syndrome type 5
- Immunoglobulin M
- Symptoms: Chronic diarrhea
- Types: Hyper-IgM syndrome type 1,2,3,4 and 5
- Diagnostic method: MRI, Chest radiography and genetic testing
- Treatment: Allogeneic hematopoietic cell transplantation

The fifth type of hyper-IgM syndrome has been characterized in three patients from France and Japan. The symptoms are similar to hyper IgM syndrome type 2, but the AICDA gene is intact.

These three patients instead had mutations in the catalytic domain of uracil-DNA glycosylase, an enzyme that removes uracil from DNA. In hyper-IgM syndromes, patients are deficient in the immunoglobulins, IgG, IgE and IgA types since the antibody producing B cells can not carry out the gene recombination steps necessary to class switch from immunoglobulin M (IgM) to the other three immunoglobulins types.

== Hyper IgM syndromes ==
Hyper IgM syndromes is a group of primary immune deficiency disorders characterized by defective CD40 signaling; via B cells affecting class switch recombination (CSR) and somatic hypermutation. Immunoglobulin (Ig) class switch recombination deficiencies are characterized by elevated serum IgM levels and a considerable deficiency in Immunoglobulins G (IgG), A (IgA) and E (IgE). As a consequence, people with HIGM have an increased susceptibility to infections.

== Signs and symptoms ==
Hyper IgM syndrome can have the following syndromes:

- Infection/Pneumocystis pneumonia (PCP), which is common in infants with hyper IgM syndrome, is a serious illness. PCP is one of the most frequent and severe opportunistic infections in people with weakened immune systems.
- Hepatitis (Hepatitis C)
- Chronic diarrhea
- Hypothyroidism
- Neutropenia
- Arthritis
- Encephalopathy (degenerative)

== Cause ==
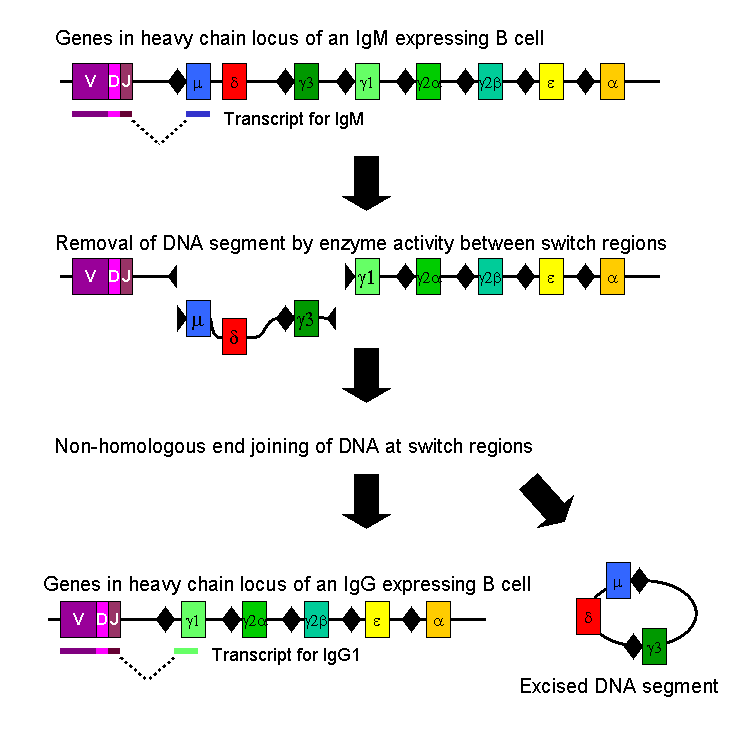
Class switch recombination

Different genetic defects cause HIgM syndrome, the vast majority are inherited as an X-linked recessive genetic trait and most with the condition are male.

IgM is the form of antibody that all B cells produce initially before they undergo class switching. Healthy B cells efficiently switch to other types of antibodies as needed to attack invading bacteria, viruses, and other pathogens. In people with hyper IgM syndromes, the B cells keep making IgM antibodies because can not switch to a different antibody. This results in an overproduction of IgM antibodies and an underproduction of IgA, IgG, and IgE.

== Pathophysiology ==
CD40 is a costimulatory receptor on B cells that, when bound to CD40 ligand (CD40L), sends a signal to the B-cell receptor. When there is a defect in CD40, this leads to defective T-cell interaction with B cells. Consequently, humoral immune response is affected. Patients are more susceptible to infection.

== Diagnosis ==
The diagnosis of hyper IgM syndrome can be done via the following methods and tests:

- MRI
- Chest radiography
- Pulmonary function test
- Lymph node test
- Laboratory test (to measure CD40)

== Treatment ==
In terms of treatment for hyper IgM syndrome, there is the use of allogeneic hematopoietic cell transplantation. Additionally, anti-microbial therapy, use of granulocyte colony-stimulating factor, immunosuppressants, as well as other treatments, may be needed.
