= Hyper-IgM syndrome type 3 =

Primary immune deficiency disorder

Hyper IgM syndrome type 3
- Immunoglobulin M
- Specialty: Hematology
- Types: Hyper-IgM syndrome type 1,2,3,4 and 5
- Diagnostic method: MRI, Chest radiography and genetic testing
- Treatment: Allogeneic hematopoietic cell transplantation

Hyper-IgM syndrome type 3 is a form of hyper IgM syndrome characterized by mutations of the CD40 gene. In this type, Immature B cells cannot receive signal 2 from helper T cells which is necessary to mature into mature B cells.

== Hyper IgM syndromes ==
Hyper IgM syndromes is a group of primary immune deficiency disorders characterized by defective CD40 signaling; via B cells affecting class switch recombination (CSR) and somatic hypermutation. Immunoglobulin (Ig) class switch recombination deficiencies are characterized by elevated serum IgM levels and a considerable deficiency in Immunoglobulins G (IgG), A (IgA) and E (IgE). As a consequence, people with HIGM have an increased susceptibility to infections.

== Signs and symptoms ==
Hyper IgM syndrome can have the following syndromes:

- Infection/Pneumocystis pneumonia (PCP), which is common in infants with hyper IgM syndrome, is a serious illness. PCP is one of the most frequent and severe opportunistic infections in people with weakened immune systems.
- Hepatitis (Hepatitis C)
- Chronic diarrhea
- Hypothyroidism
- Neutropenia
- Arthritis
- Encephalopathy (degenerative)

== Cause ==
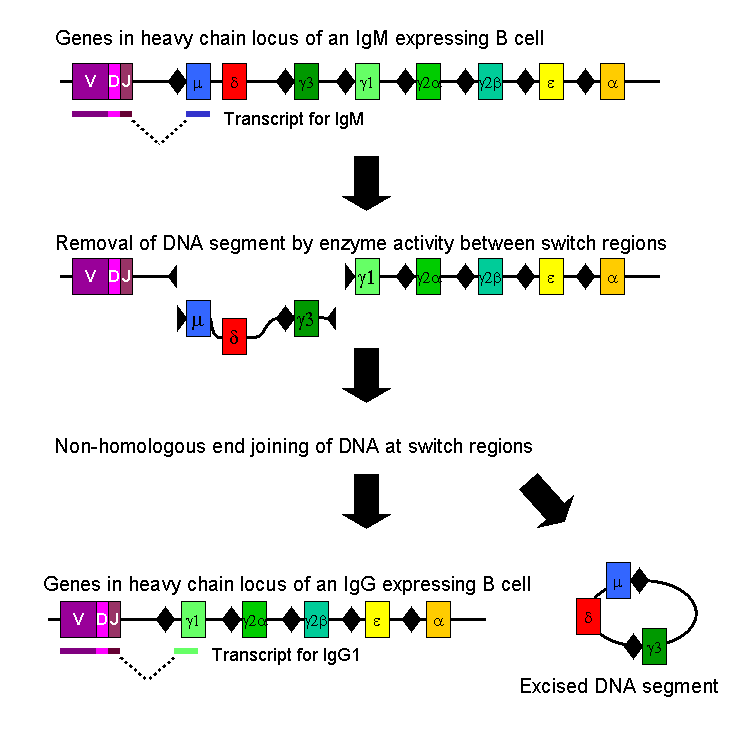
Class switch recombination

Different genetic defects cause HIgM syndrome, the vast majority are inherited as an X-linked recessive genetic trait and most sufferers are male.

IgM is the form of antibody that all B cells produce initially before they undergo class switching. Healthy B cells efficiently switch to other types of antibodies as needed to attack invading bacteria, viruses, and other pathogens. In people with hyper IgM syndromes, the B cells keep making IgM antibodies because can not switch to a different antibody. This results in an overproduction of IgM antibodies and an underproduction of IgA, IgG, and IgE.

== Pathophysiology ==
CD40 is a costimulatory receptor on B cells that, when bound to CD40 ligand (CD40L), sends a signal to the B-cell receptor. When there is a defect in CD40, this leads to defective T-cell interaction with B cells. Consequently, humoral immune response is affected. Patients are more susceptible to infection.

== Diagnosis ==
The diagnosis of hyper IgM syndrome can be done via the following methods and tests:

- MRI
- Chest radiography
- Pulmonary function test
- Lymph node test
- Laboratory test (to measure CD40)

== Treatment ==
In terms of treatment for hyper IgM syndrome, there is the use of allogeneic hematopoietic cell transplantation. Additionally, anti-microbial therapy, use of granulocyte colony-stimulating factor, immunosuppressants, as well as other treatments, may be needed.
