= Hans D. Ochs =

Immunologist, pediatrician and professor

- Born: September 29, 1936 (age 89); Spaichingen, Germany
- Education: University of Freiburg
- Occupation: Immunologist
- Medical career
- Field: Pediatrics
- Institutions: University of Washington School of Medicine, Seattle
- Research: Molecular basis of Primary immunodeficiency diseases
- Awards: Howard Hughes Young Investigator, Honorary Professor of Pediatrics, Chongqing University of Medical Sciences, The Jeffrey Modell Foundation Lifetime Achievement Award

Hans Dieter Ochs (born September 29, 1936 in Spaichingen, Germany), is an immunologist and pediatrician. He is Professor of Pediatrics, Division of Immunology, Department of Pediatrics, University of Washington School of Medicine, Seattle.

== Medical and research career ==
Hans D. Ochs graduated from the University of Freiburg, Germany with a degree and Doctorate in Medicine. He was a resident in Pediatrics at Kapiolani Medical Center for Women and Children in Honolulu, at the University of Tübingen, Germany and at the University of Washington, Seattle. He received post-graduate training in Biochemistry at the University of Tübingen and in clinical Immunology at the University of Washington. He is certified by the American Board of Pediatrics, the American Board of Allergy and Immunology and the German Pediatric Board.

Ochs' research focuses on the molecular basis of primary immunodeficiency diseases with special interest in the genes that have been linked to the Wiskott–Aldrich syndrome, Hyper IgM syndrome, X-linked agammaglobulinemia, IPEX syndrome and autosomal dominante Hyper IgE syndrome. To improve the long-term outcome of these disorders, he has actively participated in clinical trials to develop strategies of immunoglobulin replacement therapies, hematopoietic stem cell transplantation, and gene therapy.

Ochs' clinical interests focus on the use of intravenous and subcutaneous immunoglobulin in patients with antibody deficiencies and the in vivo analysis of antibody production using bacteriophage Phi X 174. He and his collaborators contributed to the identification of several genes associated with primary immunodeficiency diseases located on the X chromosome, including CD40L, Wiskott–Aldrich syndrome protein, Bruton's tyrosine kinase, and FOXP3.

Recently, he focused on the gene Uracil-DNA glycosylase, causing a rare form of autosomal recessive Hyper IgM syndrome, and on STAT3, the gene causing autosomal dominant Hyper IgE syndrome if mutated.

In 1995, he moved the immunodeficiency clinic from the University to Seattle Children's Hospital, providing diagnostic evaluations and clinical care for both pediatric and adult patients with primary immunodeficiency diseases. He initiated and maintained a successful cooperation with the bone marrow transplant unit of the Fred Hutchinson Cancer Research Center since the early 70s and participated in the design of protocols related to stem cell transplantation for patients with SCID, Wiskott–Aldrich syndrome, chronic granulomatous disease, and X-linked hyper-immunoglobulin M syndrome.

The Ochs / Torgerson Lab focuses on:

- Autoimmunity and immune dysregulation
- Regulatory T cells and mutations of FOXP3
- The molecular consequences of heterozygous dominant negative STAT3 mutations and their relationship to autosomal-dominant Hyper IgE syndrome

== Memberships ==
He serves on committees for the Immune Deficiency Foundation, the Jeffrey Modell Foundation, the US Immunodeficiency Network (USIDNET), and the International Union of Immunological Societies (IUIS). Ochs is a founding member of the Clinical Immunology Society (CIS) Annual Summer School and is on the editorial board of the Tohoku Journal of Experimental Medicine and the Turkish Journal of Medical Sciences.

== Honors and awards ==
- 1972-1980: Howard Hughes Young Investigator
- 1987: Honorary Professor of Pediatrics, Chongqing University of Medical Sciences
- 1992: The Jeffrey Modell Foundation Lifetime Achievement Award
- 1999: NIH Merit Award
- 2005: The Jeffrey Greene Visiting Professorship in Primary Immunodeficiency, Children's Hospital of Philadelphia
- 2006: Seattle Metropolitan Top Doctor
- 2006: LeBien Visiting Professor, University of Texas Southwestern Medical Center, Dallas
- 2007: Elected to the Henry Kunkel Society
- 2007: Jeffrey Modell Chair of Pediatric Immunity Research

== Publications ==
=== Books ===
- E. Richard Stiehm, Hans D. Ochs, and Jerry A.Winklestein Immunologic Disorders in Infants and Children, Saunders, 2004, 5th Edition, ISBN 978-0-7216-8964-7, ISBN 0-7216-8964-7
- Hans D. Ochs, C. I. Edward Smith and Jennifer M. Puck Primary Immunodeficiency Diseases: A Molecular & Genetic Approach, Oxford University Press, 2006, 2nd Edition, ISBN 978-0-19-514774-2, ISBN 0-19-514774-X

Ochs is the author and co-author of more than 400 articles in: Blood, Journal of Immunology, European Journal of Immunology, The Journal of Pediatrics, Cell, Science, Nature Genetics, Nature Reviews Immunology, Nature Medicine, Journal of Clinical Investigation, Journal of Experimental Medicine, The New England Journal of Medicine, The Lancet, EMBO, PNAS, Immunity, Journal of Biological Chemistry, Experimental Hematology, Bone Marrow Transplantation, The Journal of Allergy and Clinical Immunology.
