= FCMR =

Protein-coding gene in humans

Identifiers
- Aliases: FCMR, TOSO, FAIM3, Fc fragment of IgM receptor, Fc mu receptor, FcmuR
- External IDs: OMIM: 606015; MGI: 1916419; GeneCards: FCMR

Gene location (Human)
Chr.	Chromosome 1 (human)
Band	1q32.1	Start	206,903,317 bp
Band	1q32.1	End	206,923,247 bp

Gene location (Mouse)
Chr.	Chromosome 1 (mouse)
Band	1|1 E4	Start	130,793,406 bp
Band	1|1 E4	End	130,808,528 bp
RNA expression pattern
Bgee	Human / Mouse (ortholog); Top expressed in: spleen; granulocyte; lymph node; appendix; blood; epithelium of nasopharynx; bone marrow cell; thymus; mucosa of ileum; tonsil / Top expressed in: mesenteric lymph nodes; spleen; blood; subcutaneous adipose tissue; embryo; white adipose tissue; submandibular gland; bone marrow; embryo; granulocyte; More reference expression data
BioGPS	n/a
Orthologs
Databases	NCBI: entry; OMA: entry
Species	Human	Mouse
Entrez	9214	69169
Ensembl	ENSG00000162894	ENSMUSG00000042474
UniProt	O60667	A1KXC4
RefSeq (mRNA)	NM_001142472; NM_001142473; NM_001193338; NM_005449	NM_026976
RefSeq (protein)	NP_001135945; NP_001180267; NP_005440	NP_081252; NP_001392822
Location (UCSC)	Chr 1: 206.9 – 206.92 Mb	Chr 1: 130.79 – 130.81 Mb
PubMed search
- Wikidata
View/Edit Human	View/Edit Mouse

Fc fragment of IgM receptor is a protein that in humans is encoded by the FCMR gene.

== Function ==
Fc receptors specifically bind to the Fc region of immunoglobulins (Igs) to mediate the unique functions of each Ig class. FAIM3 encodes an Fc receptor for IgM (see MIM 147020) (Kubagawa et al., 2009 [PubMed 19858324]; Shima et al., 2010 [PubMed 20042454]).
