= Isolated primary immunoglobulin M deficiency =

- Other names: Selective IgM immunodeficiency
- Immunoglobulin M
- Specialty: Hematology

Isolated primary immunoglobulin M deficiency is a poorly defined dysgammaglobulinemia. It is characterized by decreased levels of IgM. The levels of other immunoglobulins are normal. The immunodeficiency has been associated with clinical disorders including recurrent infections, atopy, Bloom's syndrome, celiac disease, systemic lupus erythematosus and malignancy, but, surprisingly, SIgMD seems to also occur in asymptomatic individuals. High incidences of recurrent upper respiratory tract infections (77%), asthma (47%) and allergic rhinitis (36%) have also been reported. SIgMD seems to be a particularly rare antibody deficiency with a reported prevalence between 0.03% (general population) and 0.1% (hospitalized patients).

The cause of selective IgM deficiency remains unclear, although various mechanisms have been proposed, such as an increase in regulatory T cell functions, defective T helper cell functions and impaired terminal differentiation of B lymphocytes into IgM-secreting cells among others. In addition it was recently described that hypomorphic mutations in the B-cell receptor (BLNK & BTK) lead to selective IgM deficiency.

It is however puzzling that class switching seems to happen normally (serum levels of other antibodies are normal), while dysfunctioning of IgM synthesis is expected to occur together with abnormalities in other immunoglobulins. Notwithstanding a clear pathogenesis and commonly accepted definition, a cutoff for SIgMD could be the lower limit of the serum IgM reference range, such as 43 mg/dL in adults or even 20 mg/dL.

== Signs and symptoms ==
Patients diagnosed with isolated primary immunoglobulin M deficiency frequently exhibit recurrent infections with common microorganisms as well as a higher incidence of autoimmune and allergy disorders. More than 80% of patients with isolated primary immunoglobulin M deficiency have recurrent infections as their presenting symptom. Serious, potentially fatal illnesses could arise from several of these bacterial diseases. Isolated primary immunoglobulin M deficiency can manifest clinically as recurrent otitis media, bronchiectasis, chronic sinusitis, bronchitis, urinary tract infections, respiratory infections, cellulitis, meningitis, and sepsis.

== See also ==
- Immunodeficiency with hyper-immunoglobulin M
- Immunoglobulin M
- List of cutaneous conditions
