= Neutrophil immunodeficiency syndrome =

- Specialty: Immunology
- Frequency: <1 / 1 000 000

Neutrophil immunodeficiency syndrome is a condition caused by mutations in the Rac2 gene. It is a primary immunodeficiency by neutrophilia with severe neutrophil dysfunction, leukocytosis, a predisposition to bacterial infections and poor wound healing, including an absence of pus in infected areas. There have been 2 reported cases as of March 2010.

== See also ==
- Immunodeficiency with hyper-IgM
- List of cutaneous conditions
- Chronic granulomatous disease
