= Immunoproliferative disorder =

Overproduction of primary immune system cells or antibodies

- Other names: Immunoproliferative diseases or Immunoproliferative neoplasms
- Specialty: Immunology, hematology, and oncology

In immunology, immunoproliferative disorders are disorders of the immune system that are characterized by the abnormal proliferation of the primary cells of the immune system, which includes B cells, T cells and natural killer (NK) cells, or by the excessive production of immunoglobulins (also known as antibodies).

== Classes ==
These disorders are subdivided into three main classes, which are lymphoproliferative disorders, hypergammaglobulinemia, and paraproteinemia. The first is cellular, and the other two are humoral (however, humoral excess can be secondary to cellular excess.)

- Lymphoproliferative disorders (LPDs) refer to several conditions in which lymphocytes are produced in excessive quantities. They typically occur in patients who have compromised immune systems. This subset is sometimes incorrectly equated with "immunoproliferative disorders".
- Humoral
  - Hypergammaglobulinemia is characterized by increased levels of immunoglobulins in the blood serum. Five different hypergammaglobulinemias are caused by an excess of immunoglobulin M (IgM), and some types are caused by a deficiency in the other major types of immunoglobulins.
  - Paraproteinemia or monoclonal gammopathy is the presence of excessive amounts of a single monoclonal gammaglobulin (called a paraprotein) in the blood.

== See also ==
- Myeloproliferative disease
