= Wasscass =

German techno producer and label head (born 1977)

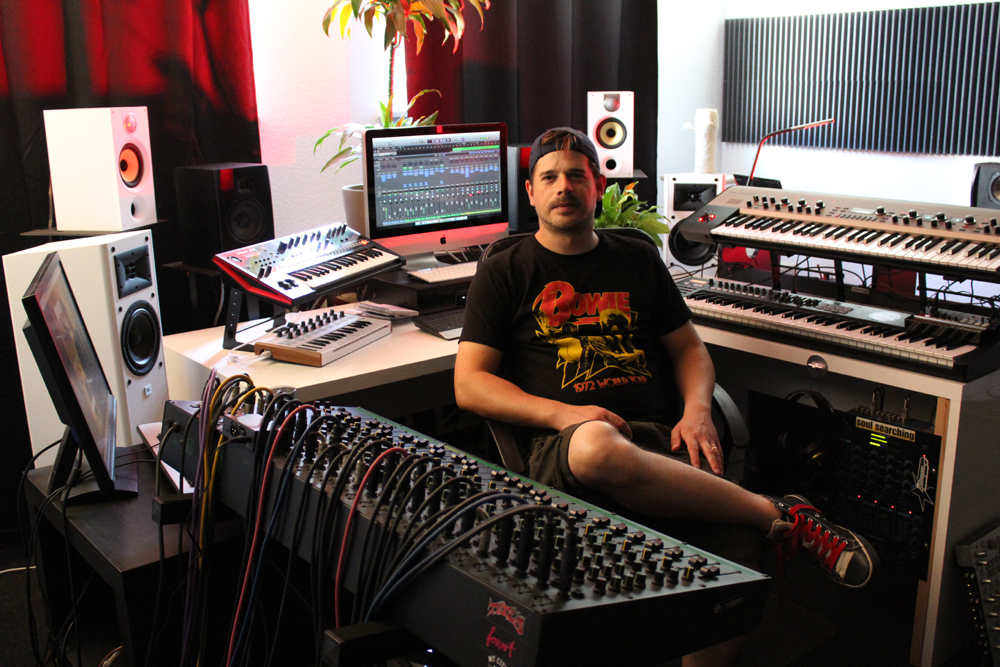
- Wasscass 2016

Background information
- Also known as: al cutter
- Born: Alexander Starnell; 1977 (age 48–49)
- Origin: Spaichingen, Germany
- Genres: Electronic, Minimal techno, Techno, House music, Progressive House, Goa trance
- Years active: 1993 – present 2002 – present (as Wasscass)
- Label: Klangklar Records
- Website: www.wasscass.com

Wasscass (born 1977) is a German techno producer and label head born in Spaichingen, currently based in Stansstad Switzerland.

== History ==
Growing up in a music-oriented family, Wasscass' life was filled with sounds of Kiss, Iron Maiden, Def Leppard or Judas Priest at a very early age already. He became familiar with the world of EBM and Techno with records from Tommi Stumpff, Nitzer Ebb, Front Line Assembly and cubic22 from Berlin.

Buying his first turntables in 1992, he started his DJ career with his first gig as "al cutter" at club Cinderella in Tübingen in 1993. He started the set with a 15-minute intro, followed by a solid gabba and hardcore set. Although this might have been the starting point, he was still missing a direction. During those days, DJ Sven Väth fascinated all revelers with ingenious hardfloor from Frankfurt. Wasscass' encounter with Väth at Southern Germany's number 1 club "Oz" gave him the greencard for 1994's Futuresonic Party in Stuttgart, playing a set with four decks with flying colours.

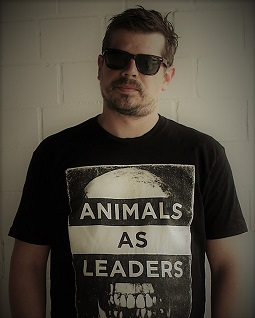
Wasscass 2018

Taking a break from DJing in 2001, he came back with greater success in 2007. Mainly being booked for industrial high-class rooftop parties always far from the mainstream, he also played all kinds of styles in clubs and radio stations, finding its peak at the Kazantip festival. Nowadays, he only returns to the decks for the virtual community, despite not being the biggest supporter of social media.

Wasscass started producing own tracks in 1996, never sticking to a certain style or genre. Since then, he is producing several projects of different kinds of styles, with slaxory being the first sub-project evolving from the idea of a T-shirt label in 2008. All of his projects have one thing in common - representing underground, aiming to establish a new genre, far from the norm. The latest release "Airport" is the best example.

He never reached for the limelight, avoiding commercial publicity wherever possible.

== Discography ==
Album

- Digital Album: Cinnamon Moon (2020)
- Audio CD: Wait Until Darkness Comes (2019)
- Digital Album: Wait Until Darkness Comes (2019)
- Audio CD: The Orb (2019)
- Digital Album: The Orb (2019)
- Audio CD: Made in Switzerland (2019)
- Digital Album: Made in Switzerland (2019)
- Audio CD: September Sun (2017)
- Digital Album: September Sun (2017)
- Digital Album: Dust (2017)
- Digital Album: Energie (2017)
- Audio CD: Orbit (project Rhythmusschnalle, 2016)
- Audio CD: Airport (2016)

Vinyl

- White City / The Cat (2014; 12", S/Sided)
- Stand Up (2013; 12", W/Lbl, S/Sided, Ltd)

EP

- Fatman (2020)
- Florida (2017)
- Traumform (2016)

Mix Compilations

- Vision of the Future (2016)
- Blue Queen (2012)
- Dresscode No. 7 (2011)
- Green Queen (2010)
- White Queen (2010)

Digital Releases

- Zwo (2025)
- Diodor (2020)
- Waterside (2019)
- The Lake (2019)
- Unmasked (2018)
- Dreamless (2017)
- Crazy Stewardess (from the album "Airport") (2016)
- First Class (from the album "Airport") (2016)
- Neue Welt (2016)
- Back (2015)
- Das Feld Vor Der Tür (2015)
- Hill Farmer's Dance (2015)
- The Art Of (2015)
- Chemtrails and Haarp (2015)
- Virginia Sun (2015)
- Strandbad (2015)
- Day By Day (2015)
- The Eye (2014)
- Magic Y (Dark Remix) (2014)
- Schanti (2014)
- Magic Y (2014)
- White City (2013)
- Stranger (2013)
- The Box (2013)
- Stand Up (2013)
- Running Free (2013)
- Die Vega (2013)
- Taxi (2013)
- Monaco (2012)
- Life (2011)
- Slimslod (2011)
- Openfield (2011)
- Bodycult (2011)
- Nastyness (2011)
- Black Blood (2010)
- Calls Cenobite (2010)
- America (2010)
- Proghead (2010)
- Bekka (2010)
- One Night In Jail (2010)
- Am Main (2010)
- Soccer (2010)
- Possessed (2010)
- Fame (2009)
- Forgotten Battles (2009)
- Schattenmann (2009)

slaxory - Digital Releases

- Good Boy (2018)
- Terra Inc (2017)
- Lipstick (2016)
- Phil Bowie (2016)
- Matchbox (2015)
- Spaceship (2015)
- Main Street (2014)
- Goa Girl (2014)
- Sky Diver (2013)
- Downside Up (2013)
- Let It Go (2012)
- Evil Shiva (2011)
- Neoship (2011)
- Flying Cobra (2010)
- Blue Morning (2010)
- Time Stand Still (2010)

al cutter - Digital Releases

- Channel (2017)
- Dust (Album, 2017)
- Count (2016)
- Pex (2016)
- Decibel (2015)
- Gypsy (2015)
- B and K (2015)
- Be Wood (2014)

Mr. Mo - Digital Releases

- Fine Day (2017)
- Trip Trap Kleine Füße (2016)
- Slow Deep (2015)
- Konturen Der Zukunft (2015)
- The Garden (2015)
- Stuttgarter (2015)
- Get Up And Dance (2014)
- Breadcrumb (2014)

Lotta - Digital Releases

- Growing Up (2018)
- Stereo Food (2016)
- Space (2016)
- The Golden Butterfly (2015)
- Type B (2015)
- ORS (2015)
- LED (2015)
- Eternity (2014)
- To The Moon And Back (2014)

Gravenberg - Digital Releases

- The Jockey (2014)

Station to Station - Digital Releases

- Zukunft (2018)
- Vision (2016)
- Stop Thinking (2016)
- Bunker Oder Bungalow (2015)
- Benrath (2015)
- Grand Designs (2015)
- Atrium (2014)
- Test For Echo (2014)

Nuclear Tango - Digital Releases

- Minitransform (2017)
- Titanfall (2016)
- NT Screening (2016)
- Crime (2015)
- Home Office (2015)

Rhythmusschnalle - Digital Releases

- Kingsize (2017)
- Mars (from the album "Orbit") (2016)
- Jupiter (from the album "Orbit") (2016)
- Venus (from the album "Orbit") (2016)
- Saturn (from the album "Orbit") (2016)
- Pluto (from the album "Orbit") (2016)
- Merkur (from the album "Orbit") (2016)
