= Aldingen =

- Municipality
- Flag Coat of arms

- Location of Aldingen within Tuttlingen district
- Interactive map of Aldingen
- Location within Germany Location within Baden-Württemberg
- Coordinates: 48°05′40″N 08°42′21″E
- Country: Germany
- State: Baden-Württemberg
- Admin. region: Freiburg
- District: Tuttlingen

Government
  - Mayor (2021–29): Ralf Fahrländer

Area
  - Total: 22.17 km^{2} (8.56 sq mi)
- Elevation: 650 m (2,130 ft)

Population (2025-12-31)
  - Total: 7,834
  - Density: 353.4/km^{2} (915.2/sq mi)
- Time zone: UTC+01:00 (CET)
  - Summer (DST): UTC+02:00 (CEST)
- Postal codes: 78554
- Dialling codes: 07424
- Vehicle registration: TUT
- Website: www.aldingen.de

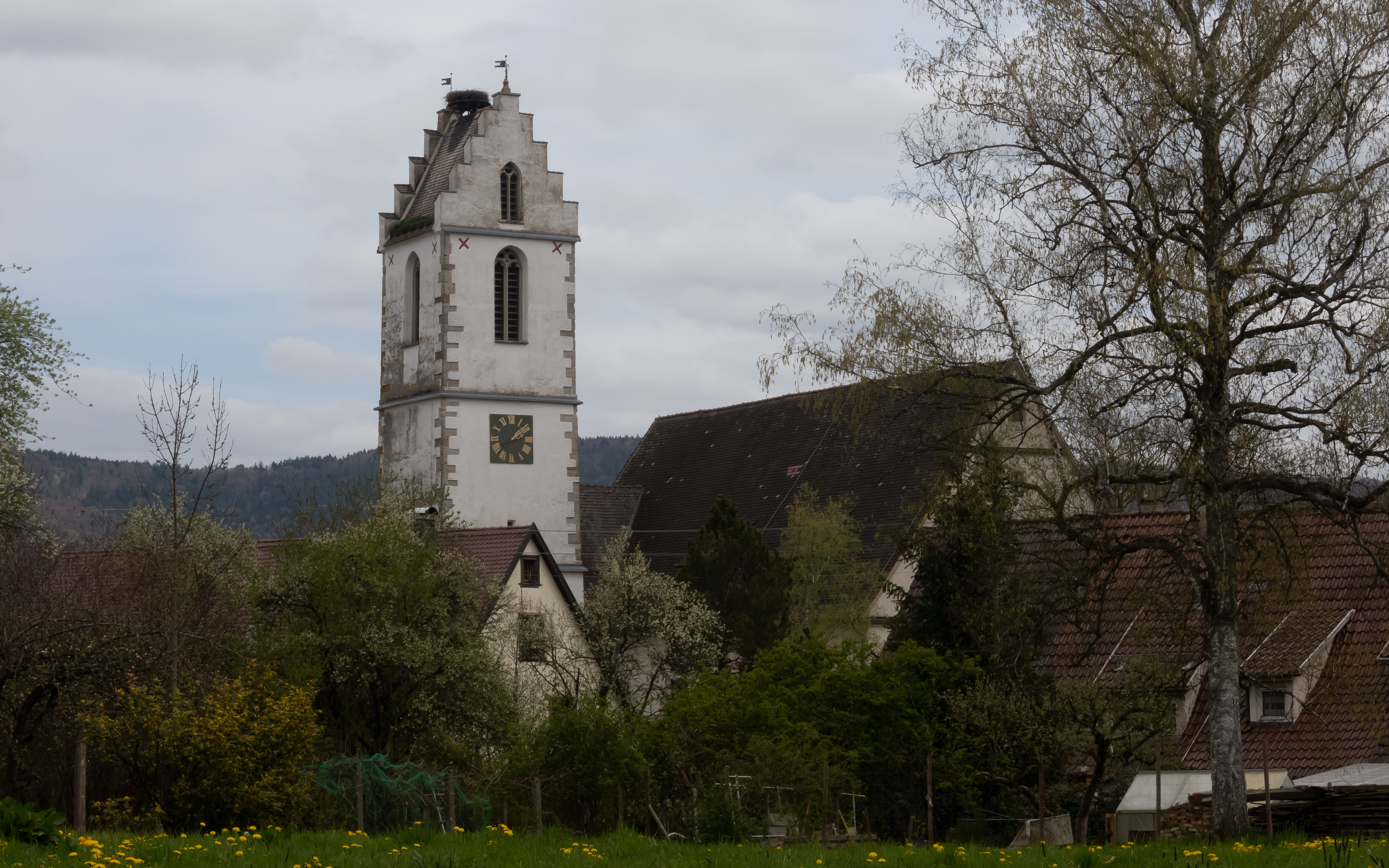
Aldingen, church: Mauritiuskirche

Aldingen is a municipality in the district of Tuttlingen in Baden-Württemberg in Germany.

== Geography ==
Aldingen lies on the eastern edge of the Baar region at the foot of the Swabian Jura, and within sight of the Dreifaltigkeitsberg (Holy Trinity Mountain). The Prim, which joins the Neckar (a tributary of the Rhine) in Rottweil, passes through Aldingen.

Balgheim is bordered by the city of Rottweil as well as Frittlingen to the north, Denkingen to the east, the city of Spaichingen to the south, and the city of Trossingen, as well as Deisslingen in the district Rottweil, to the west.

== History ==
The ending of the town name (-ingen) indicates that Aldingen has its roots in the territory of Alamannia. During the restoration of the Protestant Mauritius church, archaeological research resulted in the discovery of evidence that allows the origins of the town to be traced back to the 4th century AD. In addition, post holes dating back to around 700 AD were uncovered. In the late 11th century, this wooden church was replaced by one built of stone.

The town was first mentioned in official documents in 802 in a deed of gift of the Abbey of Saint Gall. In 1444 Aldingen joined the Duchy of Württemberg, and became Protestant during the Reformation. It was part of the Oberamt Spaichingen within the Kingdom of Württemberg.

== Transportation ==
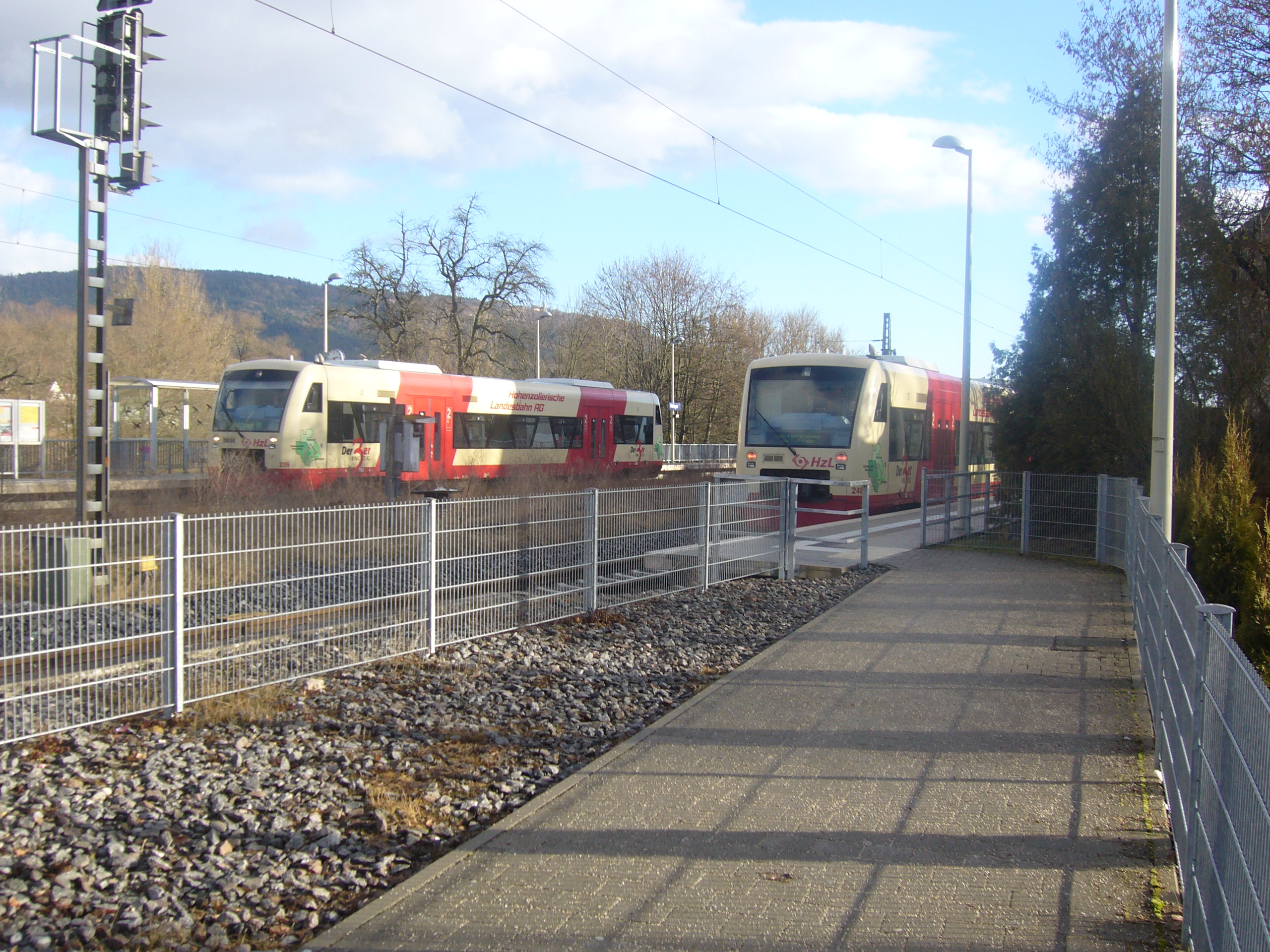
Two Ringzug trains meet in Aldingen

Aldingen is located on the Plochingen–Immendingen railway, and, after having been discontinued as a stop in 1977, again became a train station in 2003 with the establishment of the Ringzug. The station is one of the most successful stops on the Ringzug route, with in excess of 1,000 passengers using the station on a weekday.

The Bundesstraße 14 (federal highway) between Rottweil and Tuttlingen passes through the eastern portion of Aldingen. Landstrassen and Kreisstrassen (county and district roads) connect the town with Denkingen, Frittlingen, and Trossingen, which are also utilized by successful bus connections from the train station.

== Notable people ==
- Berchtold Haller, a Zwinglian Protestant reformer of Bern, born in Aldingen
