= Prim (Neckar) =

River in Germany

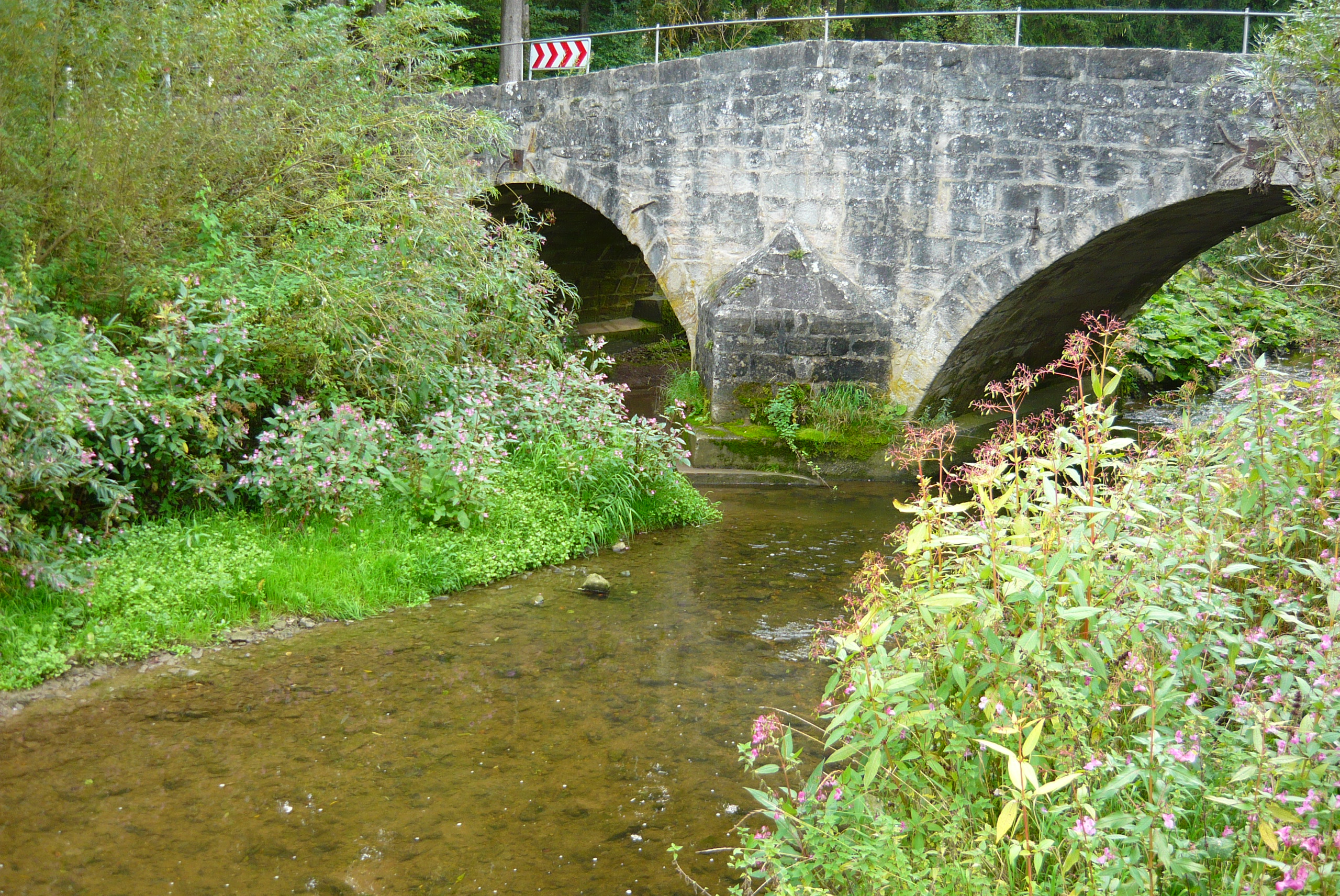

Location
- Country: Germany
- State: Baden-Württemberg

Physical characteristics
- Source
  - elevation: ca. 850 m
- Mouth
  - location: Neckar
  - coordinates: 48.1652°N 8.6462°E
  - elevation: 552,2 m
- Length: 21.4 km (13.3 mi)
- Basin size: 141 km^{2}

Basin features
- Progression: Neckar→ Rhine→ North Sea

Prim is a river of Baden-Württemberg, Germany. It is a right tributary of the Neckar in Rottweil.

== Geography ==
=== Course ===
The river Prim has its source two kilometers north of Balgheim in the district of Tuttlingen. It flows southward in a forest klinge. After it leaves the steep valley the Prim flows to the north west. It flows in this direction till its meadow. The river Prim flows through Spaichingen and Aldingen, in between Aixheim and Frittlingen, and passes Neufra a district of Rottweil on the left. Then it flows north and passes the historic centre of Rottweil and its district Göllsdorf in the east. It merges with the Neckar next to Rottweils railway station.

=== Tributaries ===
from source to meadow

- Kehlengraben, from the right in Balgheim, 1,1 km.
- Hinterweiherbach, from the left auf unter 680 m above sea level by Balgheim, 0,6 km.
- Sandbrunnenbach, from the left in eastern Spaichingen, 0,7 km.
- Kälberbach, from the left in Spaichingen, 1,3 km and 0,7 km².
- Heidengraben, from the right in Spaichingen, 0,8 km.
- Unterbach, from the left in Spaichingen, 3,0 km and 5,2 km².
- Rohrentalbach, from the right im nördlichen Spaichingen, 2,3 km and 1,8 km².
- Talbach, from the left im nördlichen Spaichingen, 1,4 km.
- Schlüsselgraben, from the right, near the water treating plant of Spaichingen, 638,7 m above sea level, 1,3 km.
- Arbach, from the right am Südostrand Aldingens, 3,1 km and 3,1 km².
- Marbach, from the left, 2,7 km und 3,9 km².
- Heimbach, from the left in Aldingen, 3,6 km and 2,3 km².
- Heidlesbach, from the left in Aldingen, 1,8 km.
- Sulzbach, from the left 608,7 m above Sea level, 3,1 km and 3,8 km².
- Wettbach, from the right near the Erlenmühle, 7,1 km and 7,7 km².
- Tiefentalbach, from the right, 2,8 km und 3,7 km².
- Hagenbach, from the left auf 592,3 m ü. NN near the Aldinger Täfermühle, 7,4 km – with its more important tributary Trosselbach 9,0 km – and 25,9 km².
- Riedbach, from the right an der Täfermühle, 1,9 km.
- Katzenlochbach, from the left, 1,5 km.
- Vogelsangbach, also Sulztalbach, from the right 582,6 m above sea level, 6,4 km.
- Starzel, from the right in Neufra, 12,1 km und 25,1 km².
- Weiherbach, from the right, 3,7 km.
- Hinterer Graben, from the left near the water treating plant of Rottweil, 1,6 km.
- Weiherbach, from the right 554,3 m above sea level, 8,5 km und 18,2 km².

== See also ==
- List of rivers of Baden-Württemberg
