= Sandra Boser =

German politician (born 1976)

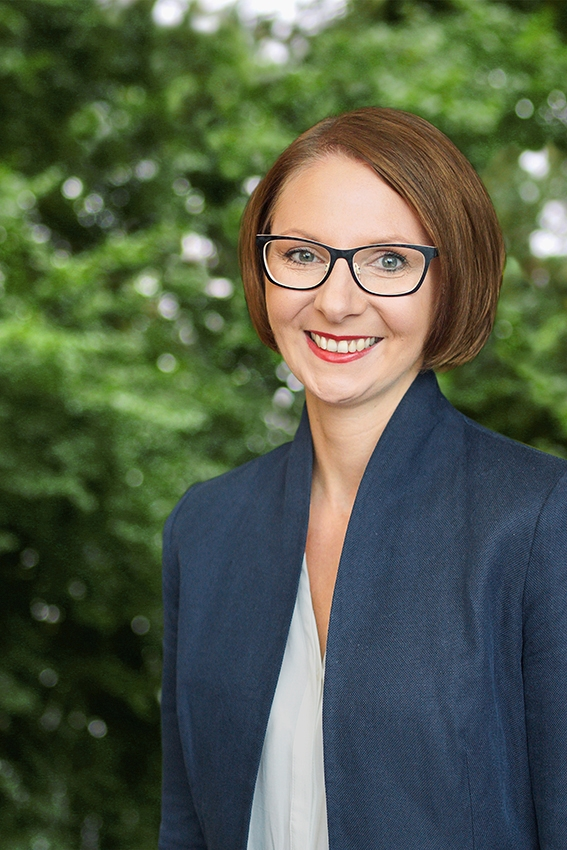
- Boser in 2015

Member of the Landtag of Baden-Württemberg
- Incumbent
- Assumed office 11 April 2011
- Constituency: Lahr (2016–present)

Personal details
- Born: 20 June 1976 (age 49) Spaichingen
- Party: Alliance 90/The Greens (since 2007)

Sandra Boser (née Rieger; born 20 June 1976 in Spaichingen) is a German politician serving as a member of the Landtag of Baden-Württemberg since 2011. She has served as state secretary of culture, youth and sport since 2021.
