= Hyper-IgM syndrome type 1 =

- This condition is inherited in an X-linked recessive manner
- Specialty: Hematology

Hyper IgM syndrome type 1 (HIGM-1) is the X-linked variant of the hyper IgM syndrome.

The affected individuals are virtually always male, because males only have one X chromosome, received from their mothers. Their mothers are not symptomatic, even though they are carriers of the allele, because the trait is recessive. Male offspring of these women have a 50% chance of inheriting their mother's mutant allele.

== Signs and symptoms ==
A patient presenting with hyper IgM syndrome may be affected by simple infectious organisms in exposed regions like the respiratory system. Vaccination against pathogenic organisms may not help these individuals, because vaccinating them does not properly stimulate production of antibodies. Symptoms can include:

- Fever (recurrent infections)
- Low counts of IgA, IgG and IgE antibodies
- CD40L not reactive in T cells
- Recurrent sinopulmonary and GI infections with pyogenic bacteria and opportunistic organisms, and cutaneous manifestations including pyodermas extensive warts.

== Pathogenesis ==
This variant of the hyper IgM syndrome is caused by mutation of the CD40LG gene. The genetic locus for this gene is Xq26. This gene codes for the CD40 ligand, which is expressed on T cells. When the CD40 ligand binds CD40 on B cells, then the B cell switches from producing IgM to producing IgA or IgG.

In these patients a biopsy of a lymph node may show poor development of structural and germinal centers because of the lack of activation of B cells by the T cells in them.

== Treatment ==
Patients presenting with this disease undergo antibiotic treatment and gammaglobulin transfusions. Antibiotics are used to fight off the pathogenic organisms and the gammaglobulin helps provide a normal balance of antibodies to fight the infection. Bone marrow transplantation may be an option in some cases.

OMIM: 308230
