= Hyper IgM syndrome =

Primary immune deficiency disorders

- Immunoglobulin M
- Specialty: Immunology
- Symptoms: Chronic diarrhea
- Types: Hyper-IgM syndrome type 1, 2, 3, 4 and 5
- Diagnostic method: MRI, Chest radiography
- Treatment: Allogeneic hematopoietic cell transplantation

Hyper IgM syndrome is a group of rare primary immune deficiency disorders characterized by low or absent levels of serum IgG, IgA, IgE and normal or increased levels of serum IgM.

They result from mutations in the pathway from B-cell activation to isotype class switching. Patients with HIGM are usually diagnosed within the first two years of life and experience severe immunosuppression. This group of syndromes is also known as immunoglobulin class switch recombination (Ig-CSR) deficiencies. The most common causes are mutations in the CD40 Ligand (CD40LG) gene located at Xq26.3-27 leading to X-linked HIGM (XHIGM) in males.

== Types ==
Five types of hyper IgM syndrome have been characterized:

- Hyper-IgM syndrome type 1 (X-linked), characterized by mutations of the CD40LG gene. In this type, lack of CD40L on the surfaces of T cells results in defective signaling to B cells, which do not receive the needed signal to undergo isotype switching. Therefore, the only antibody secreted by the B cell is IgM, the least specific class of antibody.
- Hyper-IgM syndrome type 2 (autosomal recessive), characterized by mutations of the AICDA gene. In this type, B cells cannot recombine genetic material to change heavy chain production
- Hyper-IgM syndrome type 3 characterized by mutations of the CD40 gene and it is inherited by autosomal recessive manner. It has similar phenotype of impaired class switch recombination and somatic hyper mutation with CD40L deficiency but B cells from CD40 deficient patients are unable to undergo class switching in vitro upon activation with agonists and cytokines as per their intrinsic defect .
- Hyper-IgM syndrome type 4 caused by the mutation in the NEMO (nuclear factor κB essential modulator) complex, which, when mutated, is unable to phosphorylate IκB downstream of CD40 signaling.
- Hyper-IgM syndrome type 5 characterized by mutations of the UNG gene. UNG is responsible for the cleavage of cytosines that have been deaminated by AID in single-stranded DNA.
- Hyper-IgM syndrome type 6 is the least-characterized of the HIGM types, as the gene is unknown. Resembles HIGM2, but AID is normal.

== Signs and symptoms ==
The majority of patients with HIGM syndrome present with a broad spectrum of clinical symptoms even with the same genetic defects. They usually develop symptoms in infancy and second year of life, including increased susceptibility to infections by extracellular bacteria, sinus & ear infections, and skin infections. Furthermore, these patients are prone to pulmonary complications, gastrointestinal manifestations, autoimmune disorders, hematologic abnormalities, lymphoproloferation and malignancies. Heterozygous females in X-linked hyper IgM syndrome (HIGM1) are usually asymptomatic. However, immunologic testing has revealed that they exhibit reduced expression of CD40L when CD4+ T lymphocytes are activated. In some cases, females with significant reduction in circulating lymphocytes carrying the CD40L mutation due to skewed X-chromosome inactivation can present with symptoms resembling HIGM1 or common variable immunodeficiency. Among the presentation consistent with hyper IgM syndrome are the following:

Pneumocystis pneumonia

- Infection/Pneumocystis pneumonia (PCP)( which is common in infants with hyper IgM syndrome, is a serious illness. PCP is one of the most frequent and severe opportunistic infections in people with weakened immune systems. Many CD40 Ligand Deficiency are first diagnosed after having PCP in their first year of life. The fungus is common and is present in over 70% of healthy people's lungs, however, Hyper IgM patients are not able to fight it off without the administration of Bactrim)
- Hepatitis (Hepatitis C)
- Chronic diarrhea
- Hypothyroidism
- Neutropenia
- Arthritis

== Cause ==
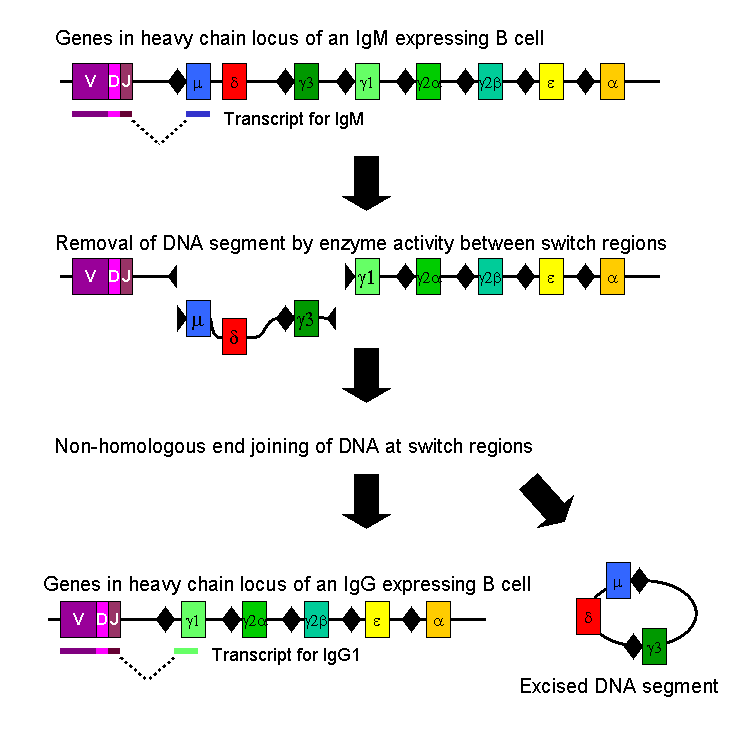
Class switch recombination

Different genetic defects cause HIgM syndrome, of which the vast majority are inherited as an X-linked recessive genetic trait and thus most with the condition are male.IgM is the form of antibody that all B cells produce initially before they undergo class switching due to exposure to a recognized antigen. Healthy B cells efficiently switch to other types of antibodies as needed to attack invading bacteria, viruses, and other pathogens. In people with hyper IgM syndromes, the B cells keep making IgM antibodies because they can't switch to a different antibody. This results in an overproduction of IgM antibodies and an underproduction of IgA, IgG, and IgE.

== Pathophysiology ==
CD40 is a co-stimulatory receptor on B cells that, when bound to CD40 ligand (CD40L), sends a signal to the B-cell receptor. Defective interaction of CD40L-CD40 between CD4+ T cells and antigen presenting cells (APCs) is known as the underlying cause of HIGM syndromes. CD40L-CD40 interaction is the first step in B cell stimulation for class switch recombination (CSR) and somatic hyper mutation (SHM) resulting in the generation of various Ig isotypes. Consequently, humoral immune response is affected. Certain insults, usually from encapsulated bacteria and toxin, then have a greater opportunity to damage the body.

== Diagnosis ==
The diagnosis of X-linked hyper IgM syndrome (HIGM1) is established in males with typical clinical and laboratory findings by identifying a hemizygous pathogenic variant in the CD40LG gene through molecular genetic testing. In females, the diagnosis of HIGM1 is extremely rare. Heterozygous females are usually asymptomatic unless there is skewed X-chromosome inactivation. The diagnosis of hyper IgM syndrome can be done via the following methods and tests:

- MRI
- Chest radiography
- Pulmonary function test
- Lymph node test
- Flow Cytometry (evaluate the presence and function of certain immune cells, such as T cells and B cells)
- Genetic testing
- Blood test(Immunoglobulin levels, Antibody response, Complete blood count (CBC))

== Treatment ==
The primary goal is to address the underlying defect in CD40L or other gene mutations causing HIGM. The potential for precise correction of the CD40LG gene in T cells and hematopoietic stem/progenitor cells (HSPC) to treat X-linked hyper-IgM Syndrome (HIGM1) is a promising avenue of research. However, the actual therapeutic efficacy of this approach is not yet fully understood and requires further investigation to determine its true potential. In addition to HSCT, supportive measures are crucial for managing infections and complications associated with HIGM. This may include antimicrobial prophylaxis, immunoglobulin replacement therapy, and close monitoring of respiratory and gastrointestinal infections. Additionally, anti-microbial therapy, use of granulocyte colony-stimulating factor, immunosuppressants, as well as other treatments, may be needed.

== Epidemiology ==
All forms of hyper-IgM syndrome are rare. According to the US X-HIGM registry, the prevalence of X-linked hyper IgM syndrome (X-HIGM) during the period from 1984 to 1993 was approximately 1 in 1,000,000 live births. The estimated frequency of CD40L deficiency, a subtype of X-HIGM, is 2 in 1,000,000 in males. Limited data is available on the frequency of AICDA deficiency, another subtype of X-HIGM, but it is believed to affect less than 1 in 1,000,000 individuals. Globally, all forms of HIGM make up approximately 0.3% to 2.9% of all patients diagnosed with primary immunodeficiency disorders (PIDs).

== See also ==
- X-linked agammaglobulinemia
- Common variable immunodeficiency (CVID)
