= Spaichingen =

- Town
- Coat of arms

- Location of Spaichingen within Tuttlingen district
- Interactive map of Spaichingen
- Location within Germany Location within Baden-Württemberg
- Coordinates: 48°04′33″N 08°44′16″E
- Country: Germany
- State: Baden-Württemberg
- Admin. region: Freiburg
- District: Tuttlingen

Government
  - Mayor (2020–28): Markus Hugger

Area
  - Total: 18.5 km^{2} (7.1 sq mi)
- Elevation: 660 m (2,170 ft)

Population (2025-12-31)
  - Total: 13,750
  - Density: 743/km^{2} (1,920/sq mi)
- Time zone: UTC+01:00 (CET)
  - Summer (DST): UTC+02:00 (CEST)
- Postal codes: 78549
- Dialling codes: 07424
- Vehicle registration: TUT
- Website: www.spaichingen.de

Spaichingen (German pronunciation: [ˈʃpaɪçɪŋən]; Swabian: Spoachenga) is a town in the district of Tuttlingen in Baden-Württemberg, Germany. It is situated 11 kilometers northwest of Tuttlingen, and 13 km southeast of Rottweil. It is 660 meters above sea level. Population: 13,187 (2020).

== Geography ==
Spaichingen is a small town located in the south of Germany at the Swabian Jura, which is a mountain range in Baden-Württemberg. The straight-line distance between Spaichingen and Stuttgart is 85 kilometres and between Spaichingen and Constance, which is a city at the Lake Constance, the straight-line distance is 56 kilometres. Many communities border on the area of Spaichingen: Hausen ob Verena, Gunningen, Trossingen, Aldingen, Denkingen, Böttingen, Balgheim and Rietheim-Weilheim. A large part of the area of Spaichingen is nature, since 733 hectares, which is almost 40% of the whole area, are forests. Moreover, there is a park in the city, which is called "Ententeich". The river Prim, which is a tributary of the river Neckar flows through Spaichingen. In addition to that, the highest point of Spaichingen is the mountain Dreifaltigkeitsberg with a height of 985 metres above sea level and the lowest point is at the north-eastern boundary at the Prim with 630 metres above sea level. The climate in Spaichingen is temperate and warm. Furthermore, there is significant rainfall throughout the year with 982 litres per square metre. February is the month with the least precipitation with an amount of rainfall of 65 litres per square metre and the month with the most precipitation is June with an amount of rainfall of 106 litres per square metre. In terms of temperature, the coldest month is January with an average temperature of -1,1 °C and the hottest month is July with an average temperature of 17 °C. The average annual temperature is 8,1 °C. It is possible to feel an earthquake in Spaichingen, since the epicentres are often in the middle of Baden-Württemberg, which is not far away.

== History ==
Spaichingen’s history is long and interesting. First of all there was settlement as early as 2000 BC, where now is Spaichingen. In the year 791 Spaichingen received a deed of gift from the monastery of St. Gallen. According to a document from 1381, Spaichingen was a part of Austria for over 400 years and belonged to the Upper Austrian Office Rottenburg and the Upper Bailiwick of Oberhohenberg, based in Fridingen. Furthermore, Spaichingen got an emblem in 1482. Moreover Spaichingen was located on a strategically important road, therefore it suffered heavy losses and damage during many troop transits. However, even looting and pillaging could not prevent Spaichingen from developing into a respectable economic center in the 1530s. During the Thirty Years War the town lost more than half of its inhabitants. In 1623 Spaichingen was granted the right to hold a weekly market. Finally becoming a town in 1828, it joined the district of Tuttlingen in 1938. From September 1944 to April 1945, there was concentration camp located in Spaichingen. It was established by the armament company Mauser from Oberndorf. At least 95 prisoners died in the camp. Because of this concentration camp, a memorial was built next to the cemetery. Surviving multiple air strikes, Spaichingen became a part of the French influence territory after the Second World War. On February 16, 1969, the largest building project in the history of the Tuttlingen district to date was completed and the "new Spaichingen hospital" opened. When the staff increased, the costs for the 132-bed new building increased to 19.25 million Deutsche Mark.

== Politics ==
The municipal council of Spaichingen has eighteen seats. Four seats are held by the CDU, the Freie Wähler and by Pro Spaichingen. Three seats are held by the Bündnis 90/Die Grünen, two are held by the FDP and one by the SPD.

=== Mayors ===
- 1945–1945: Oscar Hagen (1895-1996), (temporary, appointed as commissioner)
- 1946–1948: Karl Hagen
- 1948–1964: Ludwig Wahr
- 1964–1972: Erwin Teufel (born 1939), (CDU)
- 1972–2004: Albert Teufel (CDU, brother of Erwin Teufel)
- 2004-2020: Hans Georg Schuhmacher (first CDU, since 2016 Liberal Conservative Reformers)
- since 2020: Markus Hugger (born 1971), (CDU)

In the mayoral election on 15 March 2020, the previous mayor of Immendingen, Markus Hugger, won with 66.3% of the votes against Hans Georg Schumacher (32.9%), who was again running for office. The partner city of Spaichingen is Sallanches which is a municipality in France. The relationship between the two cities exists since 1970. Since 1991, there is also a student exchange programme with a German grammar school in Mezobereny in Hungary. Together with the municipalities of Aldingen, Spaichingen forms an agreed administrative community with Aixheim, Balgheim, Böttingen, Denkingen, Dürbheim, Frittlingen, Hausen o. V. and Mahlstetten. In Spaichingen, there have also been three Fridays for Future demonstrations. In June 2019, there was the first demonstration. Between 400 and 600 pupils came together to demonstrate for their future and against current climate policies. The pupils demand more public green spaces and trees in the city of Spaichingen. They also wanted the state to call out climate emergency.

== Economy ==
In Spaichingen you can find a lot of different companies. The economy of Spaichingen is a very important part of the economy of the district of Tuttlingen which counts as one of the economically most powerful areas in Germany. Some companies have international connections to other companies which need the different parts which are produced in Spaichingen. The biggest companies in Spaichingen are for example Ritter GmbH, Spaichinger Nudelmacher, Schuhmacher Präzisionsteile and HEWI G. Winker GmbH& Co.KG. The batch production is one of the most important areas in Spaichingen. The culinary diversity is very broad since there are restaurants with German, Italian, Turkish and also Asian cuisine. There are also pubs in Spaichingen where the inhabitants can spend their free time. If people want to move to another city or another part of Spaichingen, they can use public transportation. There are two train stations in Spaichingen an many bus stations. The train ride to the provincial capital Stuttgart takes about two hours.

== Culture ==
Spaichingen offers many cultural events and its traditions are shaped by the ones in Swabia, for example speaking the Swabian dialect and eating traditional food is common. The most extensive event in the year is the carnival in Spaichingen which is named Fasnet in the Swabian dialect. The event starts on 11 November like in other parts of Germany. This day, the king and the queen of this season of the year are announced. They will "rule" the city during the carnival season. There are plenty more traditions in this season, for example there is a special song and almost everybody will dress up on the "Schmotziger Donnerstag". Most people dress up with special costumes which have wooden masks and take part in a carnival procession. At the end of carnival people walk with torches to the top of the Dreifaltigkeitsberg and at the bottom there is a large pyre with a doll on top. Other important events are the age-group parties, the different markets, the football tournament for the youth which is organized by the sport club of Spaichingen (SVS), the children programme in the summer holidays and the feast following the home-slaughtering of a farm animal. Music also plays a major role in Spaichingen. There is a music school, the "Primtalmusikschule" and the famous band of the city which plays at nearly every event. Furthermore, Spaichingen takes part in the "Kunstweg Oberer Neckar". This is a projekt which connects and gives the opportunity to present high quality work of art in the districts of Tuttlingen and Rottweil. In addition to that, there is an industrial museum called "Gewerbemuseum". It has permanent exhibitions about the history, art and the industry of Spaichingen, but also special exhibitions which change from time to time. Moreover, most inhabitants take part in clubs. There are many different ones, for instance the gymnastics club (TV Spaichingen), the sports club (SVS), the carnival club (Narrenzunft Deichelmaus), and another carnival club which has traditional witch costumes (Funkenhexen Spaichingen). These clubs do not only have many members, they also take part in carnival and set festivals. Finally, Spaichingen is multi-cultural and many different religions are living together. There is a protestant church, three catholic churches, one of them is the pilgrimage church on top of the Dreifaltigkeitsberg, different free churches and a mosque association.

== Sons and daughters of the town ==
- Winfried Kretschmann (born 1948), teacher and politician (Alliance '90/The Greens), since 2011 Minister President of Baden-Württemberg
- Hans D. Ochs (born September 29, 1936), Professor of Pediatrics, Division of Immunology, Department of Pediatrics, University of Washington School of Medicine, Seattle
- Sandra Boser (born 1976), politician
