= Dreifaltigkeitsberg =

Mountain in Baden-Württemberg, Germany

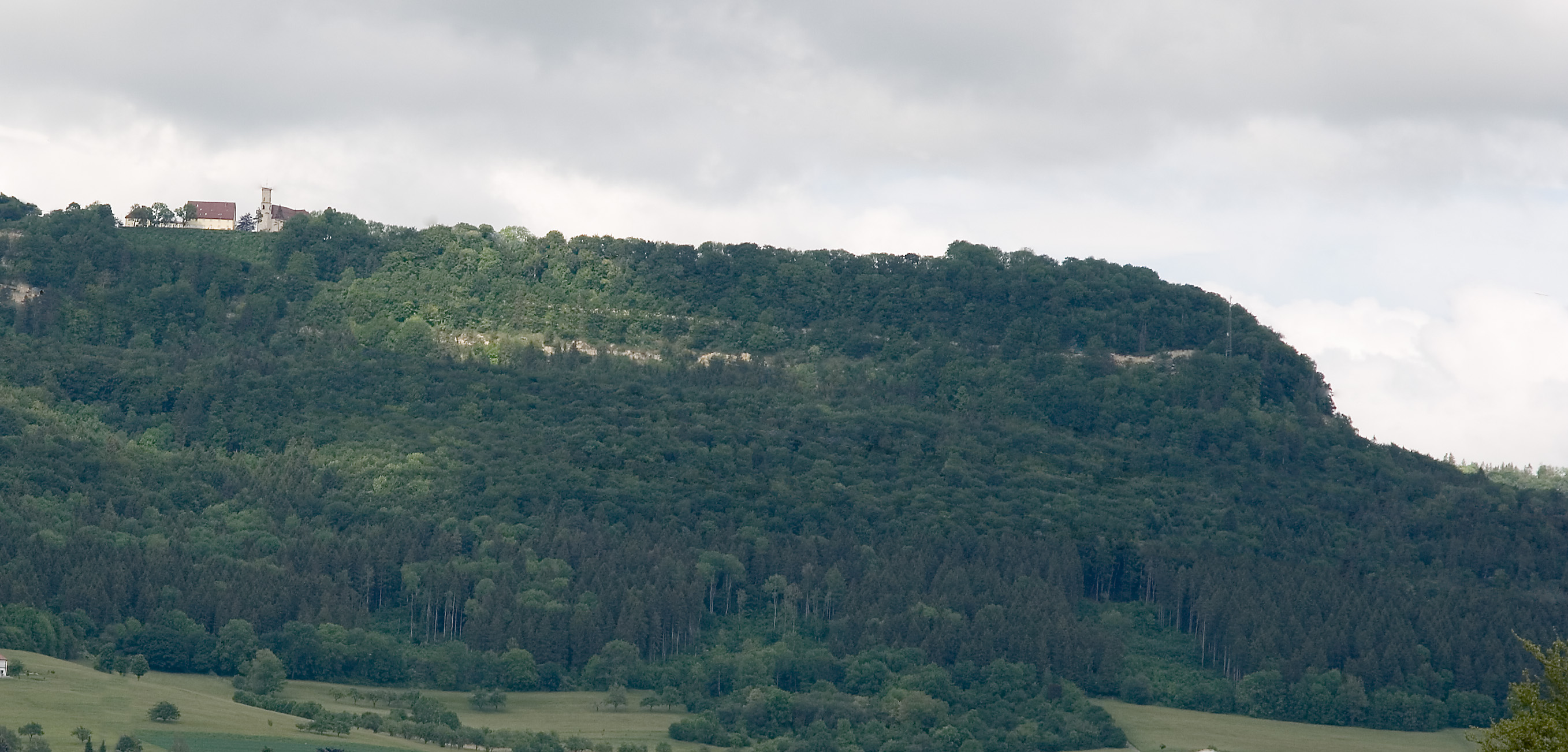
- View of the mountain in 2007

Highest point
- Elevation: 983 m (3,225 ft)
- Coordinates: 48°4′56″N 8°45′44″E

Geography
- Location: Spaichingen, Baden-Württemberg, Germany

The Dreifaltigkeitsberg (German for Trinity Mountain) is a mountain of Baden-Württemberg, Germany.

== Religious and natural landmark ==
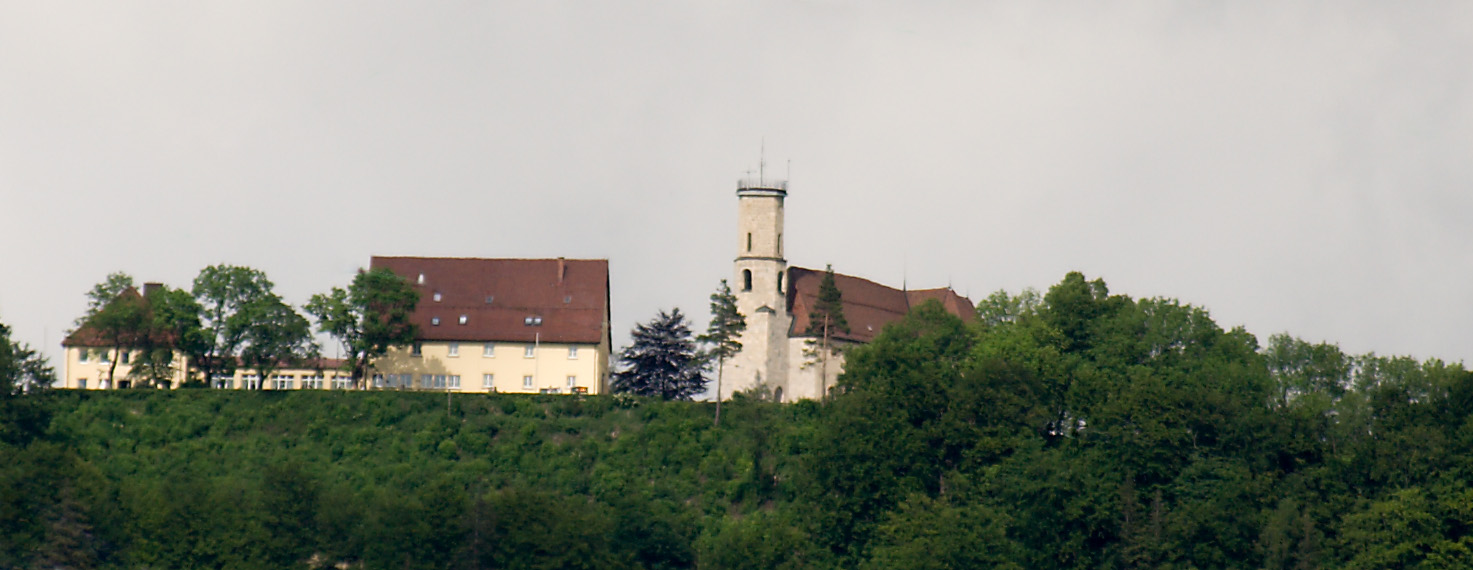
Church at the top of the mountain in 2007

Located above the town of Spaichingen, Dreifaltigkeitsberg stands as a prominent natural and religious landmark. Situated on the southwestern side of the Swabian Alps, the mountain reaches an elevation of 985 meters (3231 feet). Owing to years of limestone depositions on its surface, the mountain's shape resembles that of a wall. Dreifaltigkeitsberg is home to the Church of Holy Trinity, known for its Baroque architecture. The mountain is also a renowned destination for pilgrimage after it has been alluded to a legend when a shepherd stumbled upon a Holy Trinity Chapel. Affording vistas of the breathtaking surroundings and quaint towns, the mountain is a haven for nature lovers.
