= Dysgammaglobulinemia =

Type of immune disorder

- Schematic diagram of the basic unit of immunoglobulin (antibody)
- Pronunciation: dis-gam″ә-glob″u-lin-e´me-ә
- Specialty: Hematology
- Types: Selective immunoglobulin A deficiency, Selective IgE deficiency disease, IgG deficiency, and Isolated primary immunoglobulin M deficiency.

Dysgammaglobulinemia is a type of immune disorder characterized by a reduction in some types of gamma globulins, resulting in heightened susceptibility to some infectious diseases where primary immunity is antibody based.

It is distinguished from hypogammaglobulinemia, which is a reduction in all types of gamma globulins.

There are four main types of dysgammaglobulinemia.

== Types ==
- Selective immunoglobulin A deficiency - Selective immunoglobulin A deficiency is classified as an IgA level below 7mg/dl (0.4375 μmol/L) with normal levels of other immunoglobulins. Some people with selective immunoglobulin A deficiency are prone to infections and develop other autoimmune disorders such as lupus, celiac disease and inflammatory bowel disease while others are completely asymptomatic.
- Selective IgE deficiency disease - Selective IgE deficiency disease is characterized by IgE levels below <2 kIU/L with normal levels of other immunoglobulins. Selective IgE deficiency disease may be associated with an increased predisposition to certain sinopulmonary diseases, autoimmune disorders, infections, and malignancies.
- IgG deficiency - IgG deficiency is a lack of IgG in the absence of other immunoglobulin deficiencies. IgG levels of 300–600 mg/dL show a mild to moderate reduction of IgG while levels below 200 mg/dl are classified as a severe deficiency. Those with IgG deficiency often get chronic or reoccurring pyogenic respiratory tract infections.
- Isolated primary immunoglobulin M deficiency - Isolated primary immunoglobulin M deficiency is classified as IgM levels under two SD of mean with normal levels of other immunoglobulins. Isolated primary immunoglobulin M deficiency often presents as recurring infections. Patients often improve with immunoglobulin therapy.

== See also ==
- Immunodeficiency
- Hypogammaglobulinemia
