= Immunodeficiency with hyperimmunoglobulin M =

Rare disorder

- Other names: Hyper-IgM syndrome type 1
- This condition is inherited in an X-linked recessive manner
- Specialty: Medical genetics

Immunodeficiency with hyperimmunoglobulin M is a rare disorder characterized by recurrent infections, low or absent IgG, IgE, and IgA levels, and normal or elevated levels of IgM and IgD.

== See also ==
- Immunoglobulin M deficiency
- Immunoglobulin M
- Skin lesion
- List of cutaneous conditions
