= Activation-induced cytidine deaminase =

Enzyme that creates mutations in DNA

AICDA

Identifiers
- Aliases: AICDA, AID, ARP2, CDA2, HEL-S-284, HIGM2, activation-induced cytidine deaminase, activation induced cytidine deaminase
- External IDs: OMIM: 605257; MGI: 1342279; GeneCards: AICDA
Available structures
PDB	Ortholog search: PDBe RCSB
PDB	List of PDB id codes 5JJ4
Enzyme activity
EC #	BRENDA	ExPASy	KEGG	MetaCyc
3.5.4.38	↗	↗	↗	↗

Gene location (Human)
Chr.	Chromosome 12 (human)
Band	12p13.31	Start	8,602,155 bp
Band	12p13.31	End	8,613,242 bp

Gene location (Mouse)
Chr.	Chromosome 6 (mouse)
Band	6|6 F1	Start	122,530,760 bp
Band	6|6 F1	End	122,541,139 bp
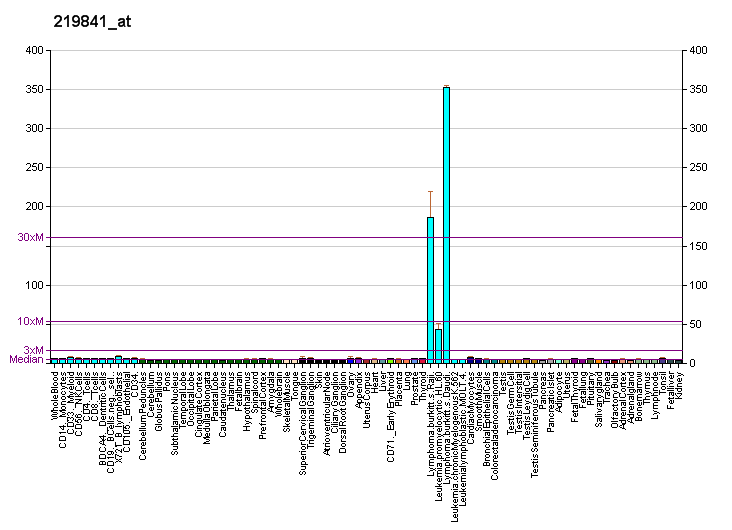
RNA expression pattern
Bgee	Human / Mouse (ortholog); Top expressed in: buccal mucosa cell; testicle; lymph node; appendix; gonad; tonsil; mucosa of ileum; epithelium of nasopharynx; placenta; gastric mucosa / Top expressed in: cumulus cell; epithelium of female urethra; ejaculatory duct; epithelium of male urethra; epithelium of vagina; mesenteric lymph nodes; muscle layer of ejaculatory duct; granulocyte; embryo; muscle layer of seminal vesicle; More reference expression data
BioGPS	More reference expression data
Gene ontology
Molecular function	hydrolase activity, acting on carbon-nitrogen (but not peptide) bonds, in cyclic amidines; zinc ion binding; protein binding; catalytic activity; hydrolase activity; ubiquitin protein ligase binding; metal ion binding; cytidine deaminase activity; identical protein binding; RNA binding
Cellular component	exosome (RNase complex); nucleus; cytoplasm; P-body; protein-containing complex
Biological process	somatic hypermutation of immunoglobulin genes; DNA demethylation; mRNA processing; B cell differentiation; somatic diversification of immunoglobulins; negative regulation of DNA methylation-dependent heterochromatin assembly; cytidine deamination; cellular response to lipopolysaccharide; isotype switching; defense response to bacterium; regulation of DNA stability; negative regulation of transposition; cytidine to uridine editing; regulation of nuclear cell cycle DNA replication; negative regulation of single stranded viral RNA replication via double stranded DNA intermediate; defense response to virus; DNA cytosine deamination
Sources:Amigo / QuickGO
Orthologs
Databases	NCBI: entry; OMA: entry
Species	Human	Mouse
Entrez	57379	11628
Ensembl	ENSG00000111732	ENSMUSG00000040627
UniProt	Q9GZX7	Q9WVE0
RefSeq (mRNA)	NM_020661; NM_001330343	NM_009645
RefSeq (protein)	NP_001317272; NP_065712	NP_033775
Location (UCSC)	Chr 12: 8.6 – 8.61 Mb	Chr 6: 122.53 – 122.54 Mb
PubMed search
- Wikidata
View/Edit Human	View/Edit Mouse

Activation-induced cytidine deaminase, also known as AICDA, AID and single-stranded DNA cytosine deaminase, is a 24 kDa enzyme which in humans is encoded by the AICDA gene. It creates mutations in DNA by deamination of cytosine base, which turns it into uracil (which is recognized as a thymine). In other words, it changes a C:G base pair into a U:G mismatch. AID is a member of the APOBEC family.

The cell's DNA replication machinery recognizes the U as a T, and hence C:G is converted to a T:A base pair. During germinal center development of B cells, error-prone DNA repair following AID action also generates other types of mutations, such as C:G to A:T. In B cells in the lymph nodes, AID causes mutations that produce antibody diversity, but that same mutation process can also lead to B-cell lymphoma.

== Function ==
This gene encodes a DNA-editing deaminase that is a member of the cytidine deaminase family. The reaction catalysed is the conversion of a cytosine within a nucleotide base to its equivalent uracil form, with ammonia as a byproduct:

cytosine
H_{2}O
NH_{3}
uracil

The protein is involved in somatic hypermutation, gene conversion, and class-switch recombination of immunoglobulin genes in B cells of the immune system.

AID is currently thought to be the master regulator of secondary antibody diversification. It is involved in the initiation of three separate immunoglobulin (Ig) diversification processes:

1. Somatic hypermutation (SHM), in which the antibody genes are minimally mutated to generate a library of antibody variants, some of which with higher affinity for a particular antigen than any of its close variants
2. Class switch recombination (CSR), in which B cells change their expression from IgM to IgG or other immune types
3. Somatic gene conversion (SGC) a process that causes mutations in antibody genes of chickens, pigs and some other vertebrates.

AID has been shown in vitro to be active on single-strand DNA, and has been shown to require active transcription in order to exert its deaminating activity. The involvement of Cis-regulatory factors is suspected as AID activity is several orders of magnitude higher in the immunoglobulin "variable" region than other regions of the genome that are known to be subject to AID activity. This is also true of artificial reporter constructs and transgenes that have been integrated into the genome. A recent publication suggests that high AID activity at a few non-immunoglobulin targets is achieved when transcription on opposite DNA strands converges due to super-enhancer activity.

Recently, AICDA has been implicated in active DNA demethylation. AICDA can deaminate 5-methylcytosine, which can then be replaced with cytosine by base excision repair.

== Mechanism ==
AID is believed to initiate SHM in a multi-step mechanism. AID deaminates cytosine in the target DNA. Cytosines located within hotspot motifs are preferentially deaminated (WRCY motifs W=adenine or thymine, R=purine, C=cytosine, Y=pyrimidine, or the inverse RGYW G=guanine). The resultant U:G (U= uracil) mismatch is then subject to one of a number of fates.

1. The U:G mismatch is replicated across creating two daughter species, one that remains unmutated and one that undergoes a C => T transition mutation. (U is analogous to T in DNA and is treated as such when replicated).
2. The uracil may be excised by uracil-DNA glycosylase (UNG), resulting in an abasic site.
  - This abasic site (or AP, apurinic/apyrimidinic) may be copied by a translesion synthesis DNA polymerase such as DNA polymerase eta, resulting in random incorporation of any of the four nucleotides, i.e. A, G, C, or T.
  - This abasic site may also be cleaved by AP endonuclease (APE), creating a break in the deoxyribose phosphate backbone. This break can then lead to normal DNA repair, or, if two such breaks occur, one on either strand a staggered double-strand break can be formed (DSB). It is thought that the formation of these DSBs in either the switch regions or the Ig variable region can lead to CSR or SGC, respectively.
3. The U:G mismatch may also be recognized by the DNA mismatch repair (MMR) machinery, to be specific by the MutSα(alpha) complex. MutSα is a heterodimer consisting of MSH2 and MSH6. This heterodimer is able to recognize mostly single-base distortions in the DNA backbone, consistent with U:G DNA mismatches. The recognition is thought to lead to processing of the DNA through exonucleolytic activity to expose a single-strand region of DNA, followed by error-prone DNA polymerase activity to fill in the gap. These error-prone polymerases introduce additional mutations randomly across the DNA gap. This allows the generation mutations not only at the C:G pair targeted by AID, but also on nearby base pairs (regardless of the bases they originally contain).

The level of AID activity in B cells is tightly controlled by modulating AID expression. AID is induced by transcription factors TCF3 (E47), HoxC4, Irf8 and Pax5, and inhibited by PRDM1 (Blimp1) and Id2. At the post-transcriptional level of regulation, AID expression is silenced by mir-155, a small non-coding microRNA controlled by IL-10 cytokine B cell signalling.

== Clinical significance ==
Defects in this gene are associated with Hyper-IgM syndrome type 2. In certain haematological malignancies such as follicular lymphoma persistent AID expression has been linked to lymphomagenesis.
