= CD40 =

Mammalian protein found in humans

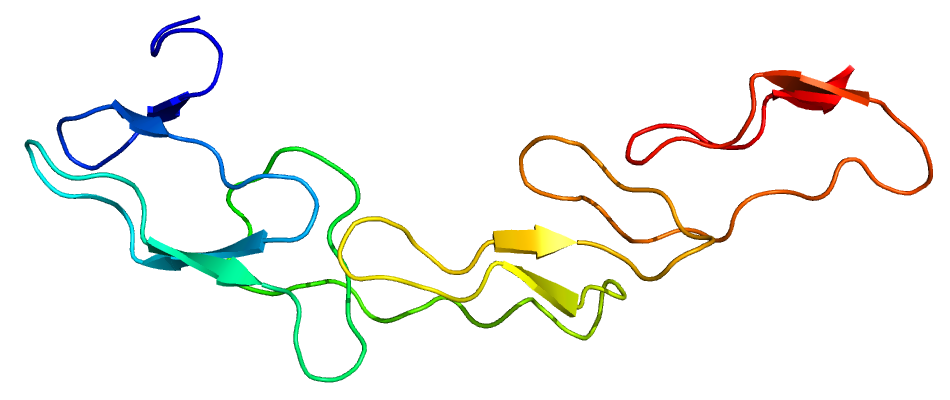

Identifiers
- Aliases: CD40, Bp50, CDW40, TNFRSF5, p50, CD40 (protein), CD40 molecule
- External IDs: OMIM: 109535; MGI: 88336; GeneCards: CD40
Available structures
PDB	Ortholog search: PDBe RCSB
PDB	List of PDB id codes 1CZZ, 1D00, 1FLL, 1LB6, 3QD6, 5DMJ, 5IHL, 5DMI

Gene location (Human)
Chr.	Chromosome 20 (human)
Band	20q13.12	Start	46,118,271 bp
Band	20q13.12	End	46,129,863 bp

Gene location (Mouse)
Chr.	Chromosome 2 (mouse)
Band	2 H3|2 85.38 cM	Start	164,897,547 bp
Band	2 H3|2 85.38 cM	End	164,914,868 bp
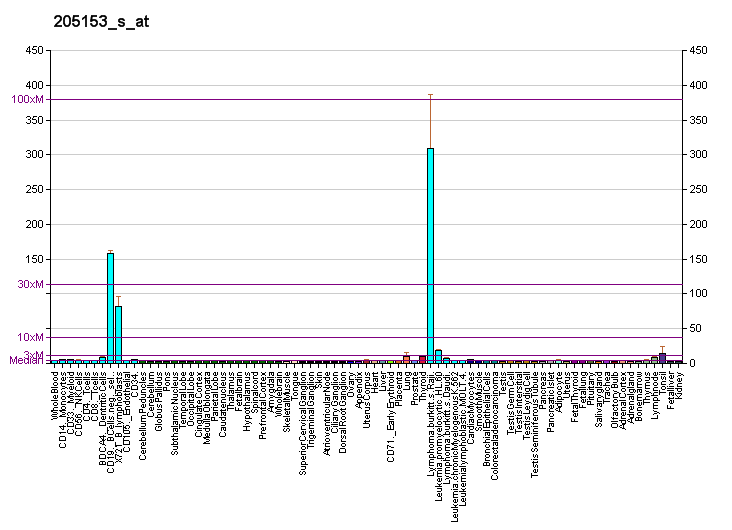

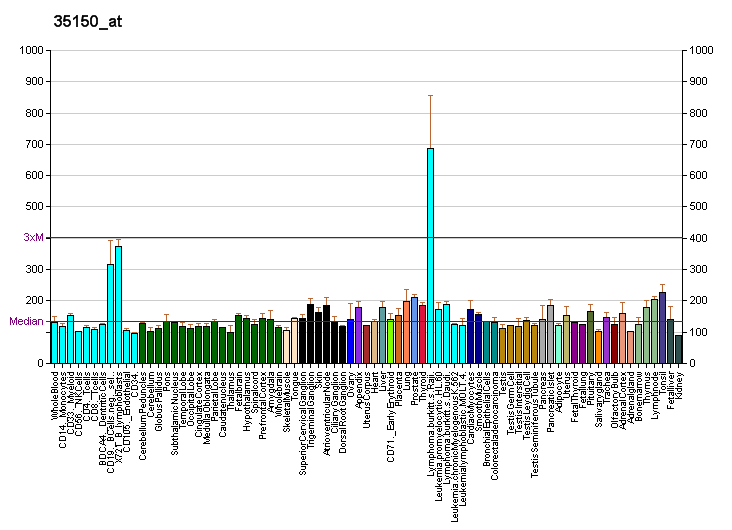

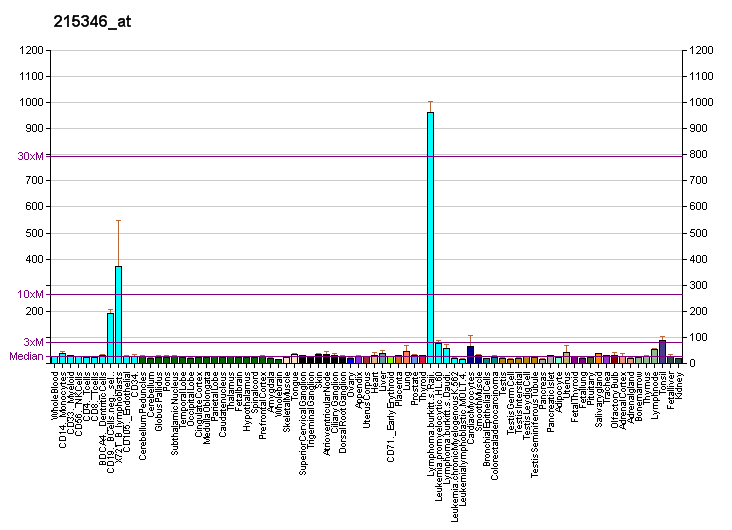
RNA expression pattern
Bgee	Human / Mouse (ortholog); Top expressed in: lymph node; right lung; spleen; upper lobe of left lung; left ovary; Descending thoracic aorta; right ovary; appendix; gastric mucosa; ascending aorta / Top expressed in: mesenteric lymph nodes; spleen; tail of embryo; blood; external carotid artery; internal carotid artery; semi-lunar valve; thymus; ascending aorta; vas deferens; More reference expression data
BioGPS	More reference expression data
Gene ontology
Molecular function	antigen binding; signal transducer activity; protein binding; tumor necrosis factor-activated receptor activity; enzyme binding; ubiquitin protein ligase binding; protein domain specific binding; signaling receptor activity
Cellular component	cytoplasm; integral component of membrane; intracellular membrane-bounded organelle; membrane; plasma membrane; integral component of plasma membrane; extracellular region; cell surface; CD40 receptor complex; extracellular exosome; external side of plasma membrane; extracellular space; soma; varicosity
Biological process	positive regulation of protein phosphorylation; positive regulation of MAP kinase activity; positive regulation of interleukin-12 production; protein kinase B signaling; positive regulation of protein kinase C signaling; immune system process; cellular calcium ion homeostasis; tumor necrosis factor-mediated signaling pathway; immune response-regulating cell surface receptor signaling pathway; platelet activation; multicellular organism development; B cell activation; positive regulation of GTPase activity; response to lipopolysaccharide; B cell proliferation; cellular response to mechanical stimulus; positive regulation of endothelial cell apoptotic process; regulation of cell population proliferation; positive regulation of B cell proliferation; positive regulation of NF-kappaB transcription factor activity; defense response to virus; immune response; regulation of immune response; positive regulation of I-kappaB kinase/NF-kappaB signaling; apoptotic signaling pathway; positive regulation of isotype switching to IgG isotypes; cellular response to lipopolysaccharide; positive regulation of transcription by RNA polymerase II; defense response to protozoan; response to bacterium; response to nutrient levels; response to cobalamin; response to interferon-gamma; cellular response to erythropoietin; cellular response to interleukin-1; cellular response to tumor necrosis factor; response to peptide; inflammatory response; positive regulation of tyrosine phosphorylation of STAT protein; positive regulation of blood vessel endothelial cell migration; positive regulation of angiogenesis; protein-containing complex assembly
Sources:Amigo / QuickGO
Orthologs
Databases	NCBI: entry; OMA: entry
Species	Human	Mouse
Entrez	958	21939
Ensembl	ENSG00000101017	ENSMUSG00000017652
UniProt	P25942	P27512
RefSeq (mRNA)	NM_001250; NM_001302753; NM_152854; NM_001322421; NM_001322422 NM_001362758	NM_011611; NM_170702; NM_170703; NM_170704
RefSeq (protein)	NP_001241; NP_001289682; NP_001309350; NP_001309351; NP_690593 NP_001349687	NP_035741; NP_733803; NP_733804; NP_733805
Location (UCSC)	Chr 20: 46.12 – 46.13 Mb	Chr 2: 164.9 – 164.91 Mb
PubMed search
- Wikidata
View/Edit Human	View/Edit Mouse

Cluster of differentiation 40, CD40 is a type I transmembrane protein found on antigen-presenting cells and is required for their activation. The binding of CD154 (CD40L) on T_{H} cells to CD40 activates antigen presenting cells and induces a variety of downstream effects.

Activated CD4+ T cells primarily exhibit its ligand CD40L/CD154 to antigen-presenting cells including dendritic cells (DCs), B cells, macrophages, classical and non-classical monocytes, on a variety of non-immune cells including platelets and endothelial cells, and on several types of tumor cells.

Mutations affecting this gene are the cause of autosomal recessive hyper-IgM immunodeficiency.

== Discovery ==
Between the late 1950s and the mid-1980s, several immunology laboratories started to use the new hybridoma technology to develop monoclonal antibodies (mAbs) and define receptors expressed at different stages of hematopoietic cell differentiation. The goal of these experiments was to identify differentiation antigens that could be used to describe the stages of lymphocyte differentiation and various functional cell subsets. While doing these experiments, several mAbs were developed against a protein called CD40, a surface receptor of B cells that can be polyclonally activated by a binding ligand. Over time, many features and purposes of the CD40 signaling pathway were discovered, including the discovery of CD40 ligand (CD154/CD40L), a T cell surface molecule which is capable of induction of contact dependent differentiation of B cells.

== Function ==
The protein receptor encoded by this gene is a member of the TNF-receptor superfamily. This receptor has been found to be essential in mediating a broad variety of immune and inflammatory responses including T cell-dependent immunoglobulin class switching, memory B cell development, and germinal center formation. AT-hook transcription factor AKNA is reported to coordinately regulate the expression of this receptor and its ligand, which may be important for homotypic cell interactions. The interaction of this receptor and its ligand is found to be necessary for amyloid-beta-induced microglial activation, and thus is thought to be an early event in Alzheimer's disease pathogenesis. Two alternatively spliced transcript variants of this gene encoding distinct isoforms have been reported.

== Specific effects on cells ==
In the macrophage, the primary signal for activation is IFN-γ from T_{h}1 type CD4 T cells. The secondary signal is CD40L (CD154) on the T_{h}1 cell which binds CD40 on the macrophage cell surface. As a result, the macrophage expresses more CD40 and TNF receptors on its surface which helps increase the level of activation. The increase in activation results in the induction of potent microbicidal substances in the macrophage, including reactive oxygen species and nitric oxide, leading to the destruction of ingested microbe.

The B cell can present antigens to helper T cells. If an activated T cell recognizes the peptide presented by the B cell, the CD40L on the T cell binds to the B cell's CD40 receptor, causing B cell activation. The T cell also produces IL-2, which directly influences B cells. As a result of this net stimulation, the B cell can undergo division, antibody isotype switching, and differentiation to plasma cells. The end-result is a B cell that is able to mass-produce specific antibodies against an antigenic target. Early evidence for these effects were that in CD40 or CD40L deficient mice, there is little class switching or germinal centre formation, and immune responses are severely inhibited.

The expression of CD40 is diverse. CD40 is constitutively expressed by antigen presenting cells, including dendritic cells, B cells and macrophages. It can also be expressed by endothelial cells, smooth muscle cells, fibroblasts and epithelial cells. Consistent with its widespread expression on normal cells, CD40 is also expressed on a wide range of tumor cells, including non-Hodgkin's and Hodgkin's lymphomas, myeloma and some carcinomas including nasopharynx, bladder, cervix, kidney and ovary. CD40 is also expressed on B cell precursors in the bone marrow, and there is some evidence that CD40-CD40L interactions may play a role in the control of B cell haematopoiesis.

== Interactions ==
CD40 (protein) has been shown to interact with TRAF2, TRAF3, TRAF6, TRAF5 and TTRAP. The remaining member of TRAF4 family, namely TRAF4, positively regulates CD40 signalling, but interacts with CD40 indirectly.

CD40 also interacts with CD40L, due to the role of CD40 in stimulating immune synapses when this interaction happens with CD40L activates dendritic cells to activate antigen specific T cells. This occurs through the upregulation of major histocompatibility complex molecules increased expression of the co-stimulatory molecules CD86/CD80, and upregulation of TNF superfamily ligands on the dendritic cells surface, along with secretion of interleukin-12 (IL-12), which promotes CD8+ T cell activation. Moreover CD40/CD40L interactions provoke antitumor immune responses by increasing tumor cell immunogenic cell death (ICD), APC activation, tumor immunogenicity through upregulation of major histocompatibility complex (MHC) molecules, proinflammatory factor production, co-stimulation of CD4+ and CD8+ T cells, and tumor cell susceptibility to T-cell lysis. In addition the CD40/CD40LG axis is important for immune cell turnover and homeostasis under normal conditions. This is hypothesized because the closest association of cell proliferation is with CD40LG and the pro-apoptotic marker BAX also this axis plays a crucial role in promoting B cell activation and proliferation, the B-T cell immune synapses among with antigen presentation

== CD40 as a drug target in cancer ==
The CD40 molecule is a potential target for cancer immunotherapy. Anti-CD40 monoclonal antibodies may help promote the killing of cancer cells by effector cells. Similarly, ligation of CD40 may lead to cell death in some tumor cells, as it is expressed in all lymphoid malignancies and in a number of carcinomas. There are a number of completed and ongoing clinical trials using agonistic anti-CD40 monoclonal antibodies to elicit an anti-tumor T-cell response via dendritic cell activation. Over the past 20 years, numerous human CD40 monoclonal antibodies have been developed and evaluated in clinical trials due to encouraging variability in cancer animal models. Agonistic anti CD -40-Abs are designed to mimic CD40L by cross-linking CD40 and in this way promoting the maturation of DCs and enhancing their antigen presentation ability. This leads to an increase in tumor antigen-specific cytotoxic T cells, which may result in tumor eradication. On the other hand, the preclinical efficacy has not yet been tested in the clinical setting, and none of these monoclonal antibodies have progressed beyond early testing phases. Because of toxicity, the use of CD40 monoclonal antibodies has been limited to suboptimal doses, resulting in inadequate immune activation and antitumor activity. More recently, agonistic CD40 therapy has been shown to decrease T cell cytotoxicity in preclinical glioma models, and in fact affect the efficacy of immune checkpoint blockade. This is likely due to the high mutational burden most of these models display, which causes them to respond better to immune checkpoint blockade than human glioma, but is nonetheless relevant information for research in immunomodulatory therapies. CD40 is expressed on B-cell acute lymphoblastic leukemia (B-ALL) cases and a study on patient-derived xenograft mice suggested that CD40 agonists are promising immunotherapeutic candidates for pediatric B-ALL.

== Hyper Ig-M immunodeficiency and CD40 ==
Hyper-IgM syndrome is a primary immunodeficiency disorder characterized by increased serum levels of immunoglobulin (Ig) M and decreased levels of IgG, IgA, and IgE. CD40 is involved in the development of hyper-IgM syndrome in that it serves as a co-stimulatory molecule in the activation differentiation of B cells, which play a key role in producing immunoglobulins. In hyper-IgM syndrome, mutations in genes involved in CD40 signaling result in impaired B cell activation and differentiation, leading to increased production of IgM and decreased production of other immunoglobulins. As a result, individuals with hyper-IgM syndrome are susceptible to a wide range of infections and have an increased risk of autoimmune diseases and cancer. Currently, treatment for hyper-IgM syndrome involves the replacement of missing immunoglobulins, as well as other therapies to boost the immune system and prevent infections. Research is ongoing to better understand the role of CD40 in hyper-IgM syndrome and to develop new treatments for this disorder.

== CD40 and drug development ==
CD40 is a promising target for the development of drugs to treat a variety of diseases, including cancer, autoimmune diseases, and chronic inflammation. By targeting CD40, it is possible to modulate the immune response and enhance the ability of the body to fight against diseases. For example, drugs that block CD40 signaling have shown promise in treating autoimmune diseases, such as rheumatoid arthritis, by suppressing the overactive immune response. On the other hand, drugs that activate CD40 signaling have shown efficacy in treating cancer by boosting the immune response against tumor cells. CD40 also plays a role in the development of chronic inflammation, and targeting CD40 with drugs has the potential to treat diseases such as Crohn's disease and ulcerative colitis. Overall, CD40 represents a promising target for the development of drugs to treat a wide range of diseases. A study on patient-derived xenograft mice suggested that CD40 agonists antibodies are promising immunotherapeutic candidates for pediatric B-ALL.
