= Immunoglobulin M =

One of several isotypes of antibody

- (pentamer)
- Protein type: antibody
Subunit name	Gene	Chromosomal locus
Immunoglobulin heavy chain μ		IGH@

Immunoglobulin M (IgM) is the largest of several isotypes of antibodies (also known as immunoglobulin) that are produced by vertebrates. IgM is the first antibody to appear in the response to initial exposure to an antigen; causing it to also be called an acute phase antibody. In humans and other mammals that have been studied, plasmablasts in the spleen are the main source of specific IgM production.

== History ==
In 1937, an antibody was observed in horses hyper-immunized with pneumococcus polysaccharide that was much larger in size than the typical rabbit γ-globulin, with a molecular weight of 990,000 daltons. In accordance with its larger size, the new antibody was originally referred to as γ-macroglobulin, and subsequently termed IgM—M for “macro”. The V domains of normal immunoglobulin are highly heterogeneous, reflecting their role in protecting against the great variety of infectious microbes, and this heterogeneity impeded detailed structural analysis of IgM. Two sources of homogeneous IgM were subsequently discovered. First, the high molecular weight protein produced by some multiple myeloma patients was recognized to be a tumor-produced γ-macroglobulin, and because the tumor is a clone, the IgM it produces is homogeneous: a natural monoclonal antibody. In the 1960s, methods were developed for inducing immunoglobulin-producing tumors (plasmacytomas) in mice, thus providing a source of homogeneous immunoglobulins of various isotypes, including IgM (reviewed in). More recently, the expression of engineered immunoglobulin genes in tissue culture can be used to produce IgM with specific alterations and thus to identify the molecular requirements for features of interest.

== Structure ==
Immunoglobulins are composed of light chains and heavy chains. The light chain (λ or κ) is a protein of ~220 amino acids, composed of a variable domain, VL (a segment of approximately 110 amino acids), and a constant domain, CL (also approximately 110 amino acids long). The μ heavy chain of IgM is a protein of ~576 amino acids, includes a variable domain (VH ~110 amino acids), four distinct constant region domains (Cμ1, Cμ2, Cμ3, Cμ4, each ~110 amino acids) and a "tailpiece" of ~20 amino acids. The μ heavy chain bears oligosaccharides at five asparagine residues. The oligosaccharides on mouse and human IgM have been partially characterized by a variety of techniques, including NMR, lectin binding, various chromatographic systems, and enzymatic sensitivity (reviewed in). The structure of the oligosaccharides at each site varies in detail, and the predominant oligosaccharides—biantennary, triantennary, and high mannose—differ among the sites.

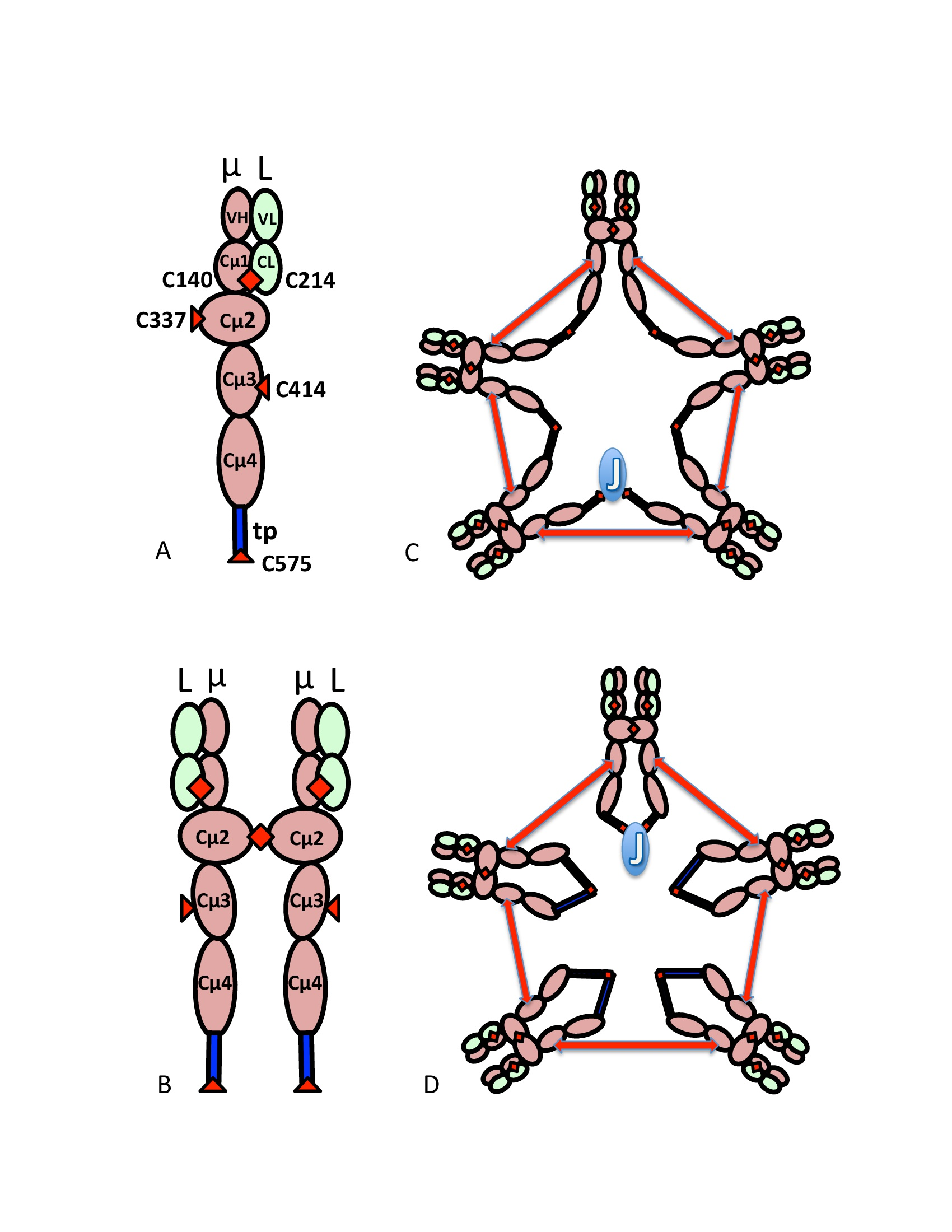
Figure 1. Schematic model of IgM A) The μL heterodimer, sometimes called a halfmer, with variable (VH, VL) and constant region (Cμ1, Cμ2, Cμ3, Cμ4tp; CL) domains. The cysteines that mediate disulfide bonds between μ chains are shown as red arrowheads, so that a cysteine disulfide bond appears as a red double arrowhead (red diamond). B) The IgM “monomer” (μL)2. The disulfide bonds between Cμ2 domains are represented by a red double arrowhead. C, D) Two models for J chain-containing IgM pentamer that have appeared in various publications at various times. As in (B), the disulfide bonds between Cμ2 domains and the disulfide bonds between Cμ4tp domains are represented by a red double arrowhead; the Cμ3 disulfide bonds are represented (for clarity) by long double-headed arrows. The connectivity, i.e., the inter-chain disulfide bonding of the μ chains, is denoted like electrical connectivity. In (C) the Cμ3 disulfide bonds join μ chains in parallel with the Cμ4tp disulfide bonds, and these disulfide bonds join μ chains in series with the Cμ2 disulfide bonds. In (D) the Cμ2 and Cμ4tp disulfide bonds join μ chains in parallel and both types join μ chains in series with the Cμ3 disulfide bonds. (Figure reproduced with permission of the publisher and authors).

The multimeric structure of IgM is shown schematically in Figure 1. Figure 1A shows the "heterodimer" composed of one light chain, denoted L, and one heavy chain, denoted μ. The heavy and light chains are held together both by disulfide bonds (depicted as red triangles) and by non-covalent interactions.

Figure 1B shows two μL units linked by a disulfide bond in the Cμ2 domains; this (μL)2 structure is often referred to as the IgM "monomer", as it is analogous in some ways to the structure of immunoglobulin G (IgG).

On the basis of its sedimentation velocity and appearance in electron micrographs, it was inferred that IgM usually occurs as a "pentamer", i.e., a polymer composed of five “monomers” [(μL)2]5, and was originally depicted by the models in Figures 1C and 1D, with disulfide bonds between the Cμ3 domains and between the tail pieces. Also shown is that pentameric IgM includes a third protein, the J chain. J chain (J for joining) was discovered as a covalently bonded component of polymeric IgA and IgM. The J chain is a small (~137 amino acids), acidic protein. As shown, the J chain joins two μ chains via disulfide bonds involving cysteines in the tailpieces.

=== Molecular requirements for forming polymeric IgM ===
It was initially expected that the J chain would be important for forming the polymeric immunoglobulins, and indeed polymerization of IgA depends strongly (but not absolutely) on the J chain. In contrast, polymeric IgM forms efficiently in the absence of the J chain.

The predominant form of human and mouse IgM is the pentamer. By way of comparison, the structure of IgM from frogs (Xenopus) is predominantly hexameric, IgM from ray-finned teleost fish is predominantly tetrameric, and IgM from cartilaginous fish (mainly sharks) is predominantly pentameric. Although the pentameric form predominates in mice and humans, the hexameric form has also been observed. Subsequent studies using recombinant DNA expression systems indicated that a hexamer is a major form of mouse IgM when the IgM is produced under conditions where the incorporation of the J chain is prevented, either by producing IgM in cells that lack the J chain or by producing IgM with a μ heavy chain that lacks the cysteine in the tailpiece. In summary, hexameric IgM never contains the J chain; pentameric IgM can be formed so as to include or not include the J chain.

An important difference between the μ and γ heavy chains is the availability of cysteines for forming disulfide bonds between heavy chains. In the case of the γ heavy chain, the only inter-γ bonds are formed by cysteines in the hinge, and accordingly, each γ chain binds to only one other γ chain. By contrast, the Cμ2 and Cμ3 domains and the tailpiece each include a cysteine that form a disulfide bond with another μ chain. The cysteines in the Cμ2 domains mediate the formation of monomeric IgM (μL)2. The tailpiece along with the included cysteine is necessary and sufficient for the formation of polymeric immunoglobulins. That is, deleting the tailpiece from the μ heavy chain prevents the formation of polymeric IgM. Conversely, cells expressing a γ heavy chain that has been modified to include the tailpiece produce polymeric IgG.

The role of the cysteine in the Cμ3 domain is more subtle. Figures 1C and 1D represent possible models for pentameric IgM. In these models, each μ chain is envisaged to bind two other μ chains. However, neither model alone can fully account for the structure of polymeric IgM. For example, the model in Figure 1C predicts that the disulfide bond between the Cμ2 domains is essential for making disulfide-bonded polymeric IgM. The model in Figure 1D predicts that the disulfide bond between the Cμ3 domains is essential. Disulfide bonded, polymeric, IgM can still be made if any one of the three cysteines is absent. In the context of models in which each μ chain interacts with only two other μ chains, these results suggest that some molecules are like Figure 1C and some like Figure 1D. However, the availability of three cysteines for inter-μ chain bonding suggests that the μ chains might each bind three other μ chains, as illustrated in Figure 2. In the same spirit, Figure 2C presents a model for a J chain-containing pentamer that reflects evidence that the J chain joins μ chains that are not joined to other μ chains by the cysteines in the Cμ3 domains. These and other models, both regular and irregular are discussed elsewhere.

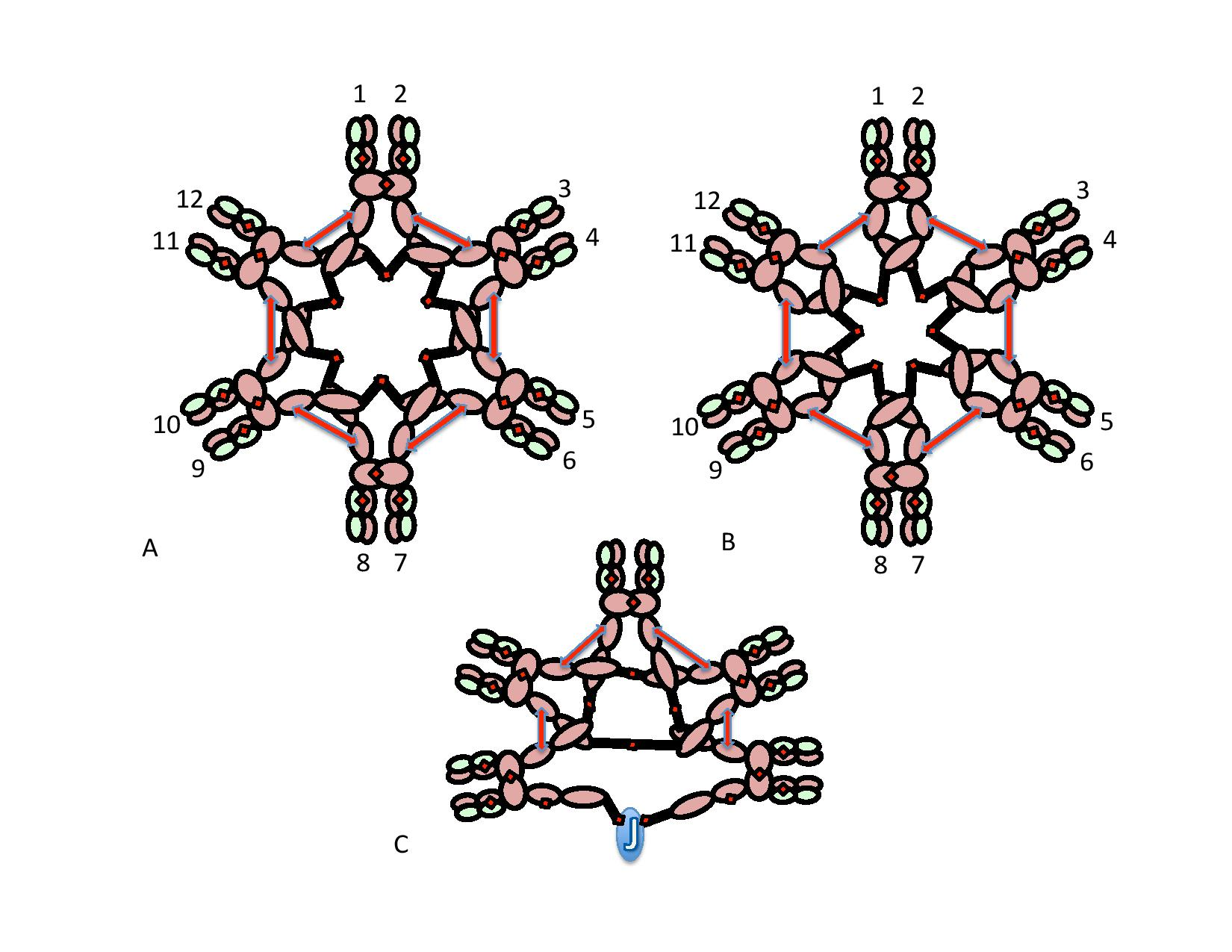
Figure 2. Some alternative ways of linking μ chains A, B) These figures depict two of many possible models of inter-μ chain disulfide bonding in hexameric IgM. As in Figure 1, the Cμ2 disulfide bonds and the Cμ4tp disulfide bonds are represented by a red double arrowhead, and the Cμ3 disulfide bonds are represented by the long double-headed arrows. In both models A and B each type of disulfide bond (Cμ2-Cμ2; Cμ3-Cμ3; Cμ4tp-Cμ4tp) joins μ chains eries with each of the others. Methods for distinguishing these and other models are discussed in reference [28]. C) This representation of pentameric IgM illustrates how the J chain might be bonded to μ chains that are not linked via Cμ3 disulfide bonds

Pentameric IgM is typically represented as containing a single J chain per polymer, but in actuality the measurements of J chain stoichiometry have ranged from one J molecule per polymer to three J molecules per polymer. The wide range might be due to technical problems, such as incomplete radiolabeling or imprecisely quantitating an Ouchterlony line. However, the variation might also be due to heterogeneity in the IgM preparations, i.e., the various preparations might have differed substantially in their content of J-containing and J-deficient polymers.

=== Tertiary and quaternary structure of the μ constant region ===
Individual C2, C3, and C4tp domains were generated independently in E. coli and then studied using a range of approaches, including sedimentation rate, X-ray crystallography, and NMR spectroscopy, to obtain insight into the detailed three-dimensional structure of the chain. The domains of the heavy chain, like those of other immunoglobulins, have the distinctive overlaying -sheets of seven strands, which are stabilized by intra-domain disulfide linkages. Overall, the IgM constant region has a "mushroom-like" shape, with the C2-C3 domains forming a disk similar to the mushroom's head and the C4tp domains protruding like a short stem.

== Function ==
IgM interacts with several other physiological molecules:

1. IgM can bind complement component C1 and activate the classical pathway, leading to opsonization of antigens and cytolysis.
2. IgM binds to the polyimmunoglobulin receptor (pIgR) in a process that brings IgM to mucosal surfaces, such as the gut lumen and into breast milk. This binding depends on the J chain.
3. Two other Fc receptors that bind IgM—Fcα/μ-R and Fcμ-R -- have been detected. Fcα/μ-R, like pIgR, binds polymeric IgM and IgA. Fcα/μ-R can mediate endocytosis, and its expression in the gut suggests a role in mucosal immunity. Fcμ-R (formerly known as Toso/Faim3) binds IgM exclusively and can mediate cellular uptake of IgM-conjugated antigen. Inactivation of the corresponding genes in knock-out mice produces a phenotype, but the physiological functions of these receptors are still uncertain

=== Regulation of the immune response ===
Specific immunoglobulins that are injected into animals together with their antigen can influence the antibody response to this same antigen. Endogenous antibodies produced after a primary immunization can also affect the antibody response to a booster immunization, suggesting that similar effects occur during physiological conditions. The ”regulatory” effects can be either positive or negative. That is, depending on the type of antigen and the isotype of the antibody, the effect can be suppression or enhancement of the antibody response. Such effects are well illustrated by experiments involving immunization with xenogenic (foreign) erythrocytes (red blood cells). For example, when IgG is administered together with xenogenic erythrocytes, this combination causes almost complete suppression of the erythrocyte-specific antibody response. This effect is used clinically to prevent Rh-negative mothers from becoming immunized against fetal Rh-positive erythrocytes, and its use has dramatically decreased the incidence of hemolytic disease in newborns. In contrast to the effect of IgG, antigen-specific IgM can greatly enhance the antibody response, especially in the case of large antigens. Thus, when IgM specific for erythrocytes is injected into animals (including humans) together with erythrocytes, a much stronger antibody response to the erythrocytes is induced than when erythrocytes are administered alone. Several lines of evidence indicate that the ability of IgM to activate complement is required for its enhancing effect. That is, IgM-mediated enhancement does not occur in animals that have been depleted for complement component C3, nor in mutant animals lacking complement receptors 1 and 2. Similarly, mutant IgM that cannot activate complement does not enhance the immune response. A possible explanation for IgM-mediated enhancement is that B lymphocytes capture IgM-antigen-complement complexes and transport the complexes into areas in the spleen where efficient immune responses are generated. Because IgM is produced early in an immune response, this might be important in the initiation of antibody responses.

== Synthesis ==
In germ-line cells (sperm and ova) the genes that will eventually encode immunoglobulins are not in a functional form (see V(D)J recombination). In the case of the heavy chain, three germ-line segments denoted V, D and J are ligated together and adjoined to the DNA encoding the μ heavy chain constant region. Early in ontogeny, B cells express both the μ and the δ heavy chains; co-expression of these two heavy chains, each bearing the same V domain depends on alternative splicing and alternative poly-A addition sites. The expression of the other isotypes (γ, ε and α) is affected by another type of DNA rearrangement, a process called Immunoglobulin class switching.

== Clinical significance ==
IgM is the first immunoglobulin expressed in the human fetus (around 20 weeks) and phylogenetically the earliest antibody to develop.

IgM antibodies appear early in the course of an infection and usually reappear, to a lesser extent, after further exposure. IgM antibodies do not pass across the human placenta (only isotype IgG).

These two biological properties of IgM make it useful in the diagnosis of infectious diseases. Demonstrating IgM antibodies in a patient's serum indicates recent infection, or in a neonate's serum indicates intrauterine infection (e.g. congenital rubella syndrome).

The development of anti-donor IgM after organ transplantation is not associated with graft rejection but it may have a protective effect.

IgM in normal serum is often found to bind to specific antigens, even in the absence of prior immunization. For this reason, IgM has sometimes been called a "natural antibody". This phenomenon is probably due to the high avidity of IgM that allows it to bind detectably even to weakly cross-reacting antigens that are naturally occurring. For example, the IgM antibodies that bind to the red blood cell A and B antigens might be formed in early life as a result of exposure to A- and B-like substances that are present in bacteria or perhaps also in plant materials.

IgM antibodies are mainly responsible for the clumping (agglutination) of red blood cells if the recipient of a blood transfusion receives blood that is not compatible with their blood type.

A mutation of the mu chain within IgM causes autosomal recessive agammaglobulinemia.

The presence of IgM or, rarely, IgG is one of the obligate criteria for a diagnosis of Schnitzler's syndrome.

== See also ==
- Immunodeficiency with hyper-immunoglobulin M
- Immunoglobulin A (IgA)
- Immunoglobulin E (IgE)
- Immunoglobulin G (IgG)
- Immunoglobulin M deficiency
- Immune system
