= Immunoglobulin class switching =

Biological mechanism

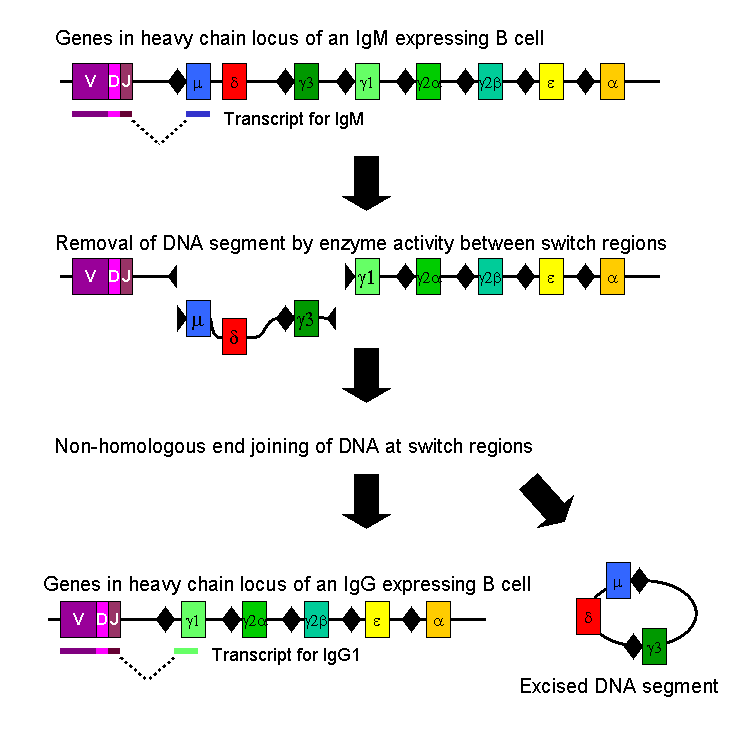
Mechanism of class-switch recombination that allows isotype switching in activated B cells.

Immunoglobulin class switching, also known as isotype switching, isotypic commutation or class-switch recombination (CSR), is a biological mechanism that changes a B cell's production of immunoglobulin from one type to another, such as from the isotype IgM to the isotype IgG. During this process, the constant-region portion of the antibody heavy chain is changed, but the variable region of the heavy chain stays the same (the terms variable and constant refer to changes or lack thereof between antibodies that target different epitopes). Since the variable region does not change, class switching does not affect antigen specificity. Instead, the antibody retains affinity for the same antigens, but can interact with different effector molecules.

== Mechanism ==
Class switching occurs after activation of a mature B cell via its membrane-bound antibody molecule (or B cell receptor) to generate the different classes of antibody, all with the same variable domains as the original antibody generated in the immature B cell during the process of V(D)J recombination, but possessing distinct constant domains in their heavy chains.

Naïve mature B cells produce both IgM and IgD, which are the first two heavy chain segments in the immunoglobulin locus. After activation by antigen, these B cells proliferate. If these activated B cells encounter specific signaling molecules via their CD40 and cytokine receptors (both modulated by T helper cells), they undergo antibody class switching to produce IgG, IgA or IgE antibodies. During class switching, the constant region of the immunoglobulin heavy chain changes but the variable regions do not, and therefore antigenic specificity remains the same. This allows different daughter cells from the same activated B cell to produce antibodies of different isotypes or subtypes (e.g. IgG1, IgG2).

In humans, the order of the heavy chain exons is as follows:

1. μ - IgM
2. δ - IgD
3. γ_{3} - IgG3
4. γ_{1} - IgG1
5. α_{1} - IgA1
6. γ_{2} - IgG2
7. γ_{4} - IgG4
8. ε - IgE
9. α_{2} - IgA2

Each heavy chain actually consists of more than one exon, which are spliced together in the mRNA. Each chain is terminated by an exon that has a stop codon. In species that undergo class switch recombination, there are additional parts to allow CSR to happen, so each "heavy chain" or "group of exons" generally contains, from 5' to 3':

- A conserved conserved nucleotide motif called a switch (S) region, found in all H chains (i.e. S_{μ}, S_{γ3}, etc.) except the IgD chain.
- A number of C (constant) exons, which encode an immunoglobulin-fold constant domain, except in a few mammalian C2 codons where it encodes a flexible "hinge" derived from the bulky domain.
- A poly-A tract.
- One or more m (membrane) exons, which encode the transmembrane region found on the B cell receptor versions of the antibody. Whether this part is included by alternative splicing determines whether an anchored BCR or a free-floating antibody is made.
- Another poly-A tract, after which another "group" or "chain" begins.

=== Class switch recombination ===
Class switching occurs by a mechanism called class switch recombination (CSR) binding. Class switch recombination is a biological mechanism that allows the class of antibody produced by an activated B cell to change during a process known as isotype or class switching. During CSR, portions of the antibody heavy chain locus are removed from the chromosome and the gene segments surrounding the deleted portion are rejoined to retain a functional antibody gene that produces antibody of a different isotype.

Double-stranded breaks are generated in DNA at S regions. DNA is nicked and broken at two selected S-regions by the activity of a series of enzymes, including activation-induced (cytidine) deaminase (AID), uracil DNA glycosylase, and apyrimidic/apurinic (AP)-endonucleases. AID begins the process of class switching by deaminating (removing an amino group from) cytosines within the S regions, converting the original C bases into deoxyuridine and allowing the uracil glycosylase to excise the base. This allows AP-endonucleases to cut the newly-formed abasic site, creating the initial SSBs that spontaneously form DSBs. The intervening DNA between the S-regions is subsequently deleted from the chromosome, removing unwanted μ or δ heavy chain constant region exons and allowing substitution of a γ, α or ε constant region gene segment. The free ends of the DNA are rejoined by a process called non-homologous end joining (NHEJ) to link the variable domain exon to the desired downstream constant domain exon of the antibody heavy chain. In the absence of non-homologous end joining, free ends of DNA may be rejoined by an alternative pathway biased toward microhomology joins. With the exception of the μ and δ genes, only one antibody class is expressed by a B cell at any point in time. While class switch recombination is mostly a deletional process, rearranging a chromosome in "cis", it can also occur (in 10 to 20% of cases, depending upon the Ig class) as an inter-chromosomal translocation mixing immunoglobulin heavy chain genes from both alleles.

IgD very rarely undergoes CSR, but it does happen in mammals. Instead of an S region, IgD has an upstream σδ and a Σδ region (from 5' to 3'). The Σδ region can act as an S-region when pairing up with Sμ, allowing CSR to happen. Alternatively, the σδ region can pair up with a Iμ region further upstream of Sμ. These have been observed in human cancer cells and possibly tonsillar B cells.

=== Alternative splicing ===
In fish (which have not evolved CSR), alternative splicing is used to determine which class is expressed. DNA is not directly cut out. This method remains in use in animals that have evolved CSR, including humans, where it allows a B cell to select a mix of IgG and IgD heavy chains as it sees fit.

== Cytokines responsible for class switching ==
T cell cytokines modulate class switching in mice (Table 1) and humans (Table 2). These cytokines may have suppressive effect on production of IgM.

Table 1. Class switching in mice
T cells	Cytokines	Immunoglobulin classes					
T cells	Cytokines	IgG1	IgG2a	IgG2b	IgG3	IgG4	IgE
T_{h}2	IL-4	↑	↓	↓	↓	↓	↑
T_{h}2	IL-5					↑	
T_{h}1	IFNγ	↓	↑	↓	↑	↓	↓
Treg	TGFβ			↑	↓	↑	
Treg	IL-10				↑		

Table 2. Class switching in humans
T cells	Cytokines	Immunoglobulin classes					
T cells	Cytokines	IgG1	IgG2	IgG3	IgG4	IgA	IgE
T_{h}2	IL-4	↑		↓	↑		↑
T_{h}2	IL-5					↑	
T_{h}1	IFNγ	↓		↑			↓
Treg	TGFβ			↓		↑	
Treg	IL-10	↑		↑			

== Gene regulatory sequences responsible for class switching ==
In addition to the highly repetitive structure of the target S regions, the process of class switching needs S regions to be first transcribed and spliced out of the immunoglobulin heavy chain transcripts (where they lie within introns). Chromatin remodeling, accessibility to transcription and to AID, and synapsis of broken S regions are under the control of a large super-enhancer, located downstream the more distal Calpha gene, the 3' regulatory region (3'RR). In some occasions, the 3'RR super-enhancer can itself be targeted by AID and undergo DNA breaks and junction with Sμ, which then deletes the Ig heavy chain locus and defines locus suicide recombination (LSR).

== See also ==
- Antibody
- Genetic recombination
- Immune checkpoint
- Immunogenetics
