= Hercegkút =

Hercegkút Trautsondorf
- Village
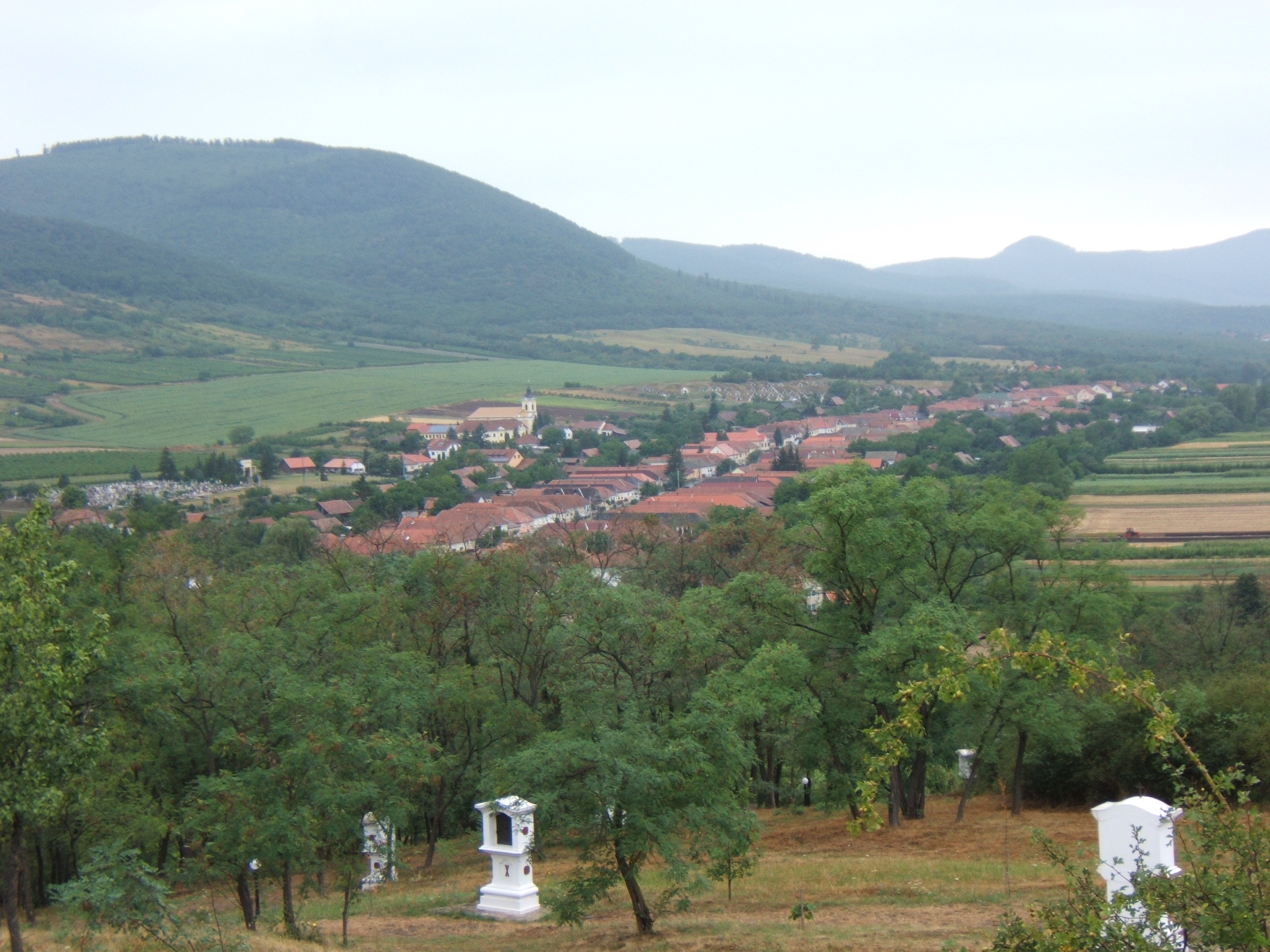

- Flag Coat of arms

- Location of Hercegkút
- Coordinates: 48.33469°N 21.52855°E
- Country: Hungary
- Region: Northern Hungary
- County: Borsod-Abaúj-Zemplén
- District: Sárospatak
- Established: 1750

Government
  - Mayor: József Rák

Area
  - Total: 7.81 km^{2} (3.02 sq mi)

Population (1 January 2025)
  - Total: 598
  - Density: 76.6/km^{2} (198/sq mi)

Population by ethnicity (2022)
  - Hungarian: 96,1%
  - German: 41,3%
  - Slovak: 0,3%
  - Bulgarian: 0,2%
  - Other: 2,0%
  - Unreported: 3,4%

Population by religion (2022)
  - Roman Catholic: 69,3%
  - Reformed: 6,8%
  - Greek Catholic: 2,1%
  - Other Catholic: 1,0%
  - Other Christian: 0,5%
  - Lutheran: 0,2%
  - Other denomination: 0,3%
  - Non religious: 2,4%
  - Unreported: 17,4%
- Time zone: UTC+1 (CET)
  - Summer (DST): UTC+2 (CEST)
- Postal code: 3958
- Area code: (+36) 47
- Website: www.hercegkut.hu

Hercegkút (German: Trautsondorf) is a village in Borsod-Abaúj-Zemplén County in northeastern Hungary. Swabians— German immigrants — from the Black Forest (Schwarzwald) region of Germany settled here and played a major role in the evolution of the village’s viticulture. The cellars of Gombos Hill and Kőporos are UNESCO World Heritage Sites.

== History ==
=== German (Swabian) colonists ===
Hercegkút belonged to the domain of the Rákóczi family. The settlement was established in 1750, when its landlord, Prince Trautson, invited German settlers to the area after Rákóczi's War of Independence fought against the Habsburgs, similarly to the nearby villages of Károlyfalva (Karlsdorf) and Rátka (Ratkau). The settlement of the area of today's village took place in the summer of 1750, the early settlers came along the Danube in carts and on foot, but some traveled as far as Buda on rafts.

The settlement originally bore Prince Trautso's name, it was called Trautsondorf (German for 'Village of Trautson'), or Trauczonfalvá in Hungarian. The name of the settlement was changed to its current name Hercegkút in 1905.

The German settlers originally came from what is nowadays the German state (Land) of Baden-Württemberg - from the settlements of Balgheim, Binsdorf (Geislingen, Zollernalbkreis), Binswangen, Bitz, Böttingen, Bubsheim, Deißlingen, Denkingen, Dürbheim, Frittlingen, Gosheim, Harpolingen (Bad Säckingen), Hettingen, Illerrieden, Kolbingen, Lautlingen, Luttingen (Laufenburg), Margrethausen (Albstadt), Renquishausen, Wehingen. The settlers were mainly engaged in viticulture.

=== Establishment of the village ===
During the first decades, only 80 acres of arable land could be occupied by clearing forests, but half a century later the village had already grown 543 acres. By the 1780s, the population of the village reached 420-430 people, so the intention to build a spacious church worthy of the size of the village arose. The royal license was obtained in 1779, and the landlord's patronage was obtained in 1785.

=== Religious background ===
The original settlers who founded the village were all Roman Catholic. After demarcating the area of the village, the first building was a small chapel, which was used until 1788. A stone cross can still be seen in front of the chapel's former location.

The founders of the village belonged to the Roman Catholic Parish of Patak, a situation which lasted until the consecration of village's own Roman Catholic church on September 8, 1788 and the founding of its independent parish. Hercegkút's local church customs (e.g. baptisms, marriages, funerals) to this day, carry distinctly Swabian-Alemannic features.

=== Deportations ===
After World War II, the village suffered many hardships due to its German origin. The greatest disaster that affected the entire community was the suffering of the 135 persons (men and women) who were deported to the Soviet Union for forced labor on January 2, 1945. A few days of public work in the match factory in Debrecen is what the villagers were told they were going to do. All able-bodied men aged 17–45 and women aged 18–30 of the village were deported on trains. Instead of Debrecen, two weeks later and 1,600 kilometers further east, they arrived at the Chistyakovo camp in Stalin's Soviet Union, in today's Eastern Ukraine. Instead of the three days of "public work", they faced forced labor for an unforeseeable period of time in Ukrainian coal mines blown up by withdrawing Nazi troops.

The daily task of the internees was to bring the coal mines into working condition, and later to start production for the Soviet industry. The brigades could not come up from the mine until the prescribed standard was met, if this was not achieved, they sometimes did not see the sunlight for days.

Their food was scarce, and their working conditions were life-threatening. Freed from the damp mines, they walked for hours in frozen wet clothes to the camps. Typhus, malaria, and dysentery took their toll.

Fifteen of the 135 villagers taken from Hercegkút were never able to return home. Those who returned came home mentally broken and physically weakened. The Soviets threatened all returnees: if they dared to speak, their families would suffer the consequences and they would go back to the mine. The last 13 people arrived home on October 20, 1949.

Despite this trauma, the community's sense of Swabian identity remained, it kept its traditions and holidays and today it still keeps 16 accepted holidays, some of which were famous holidays in Germany as well.

In 1908, the village became a member of the Tokaj-Hegyalja closed wine region. Since 2002, both rows of cellars have been added to the UNESCO World Heritage List in the cultural landscape category as part of the Tokaj Mountains Wine Region.

== Population ==
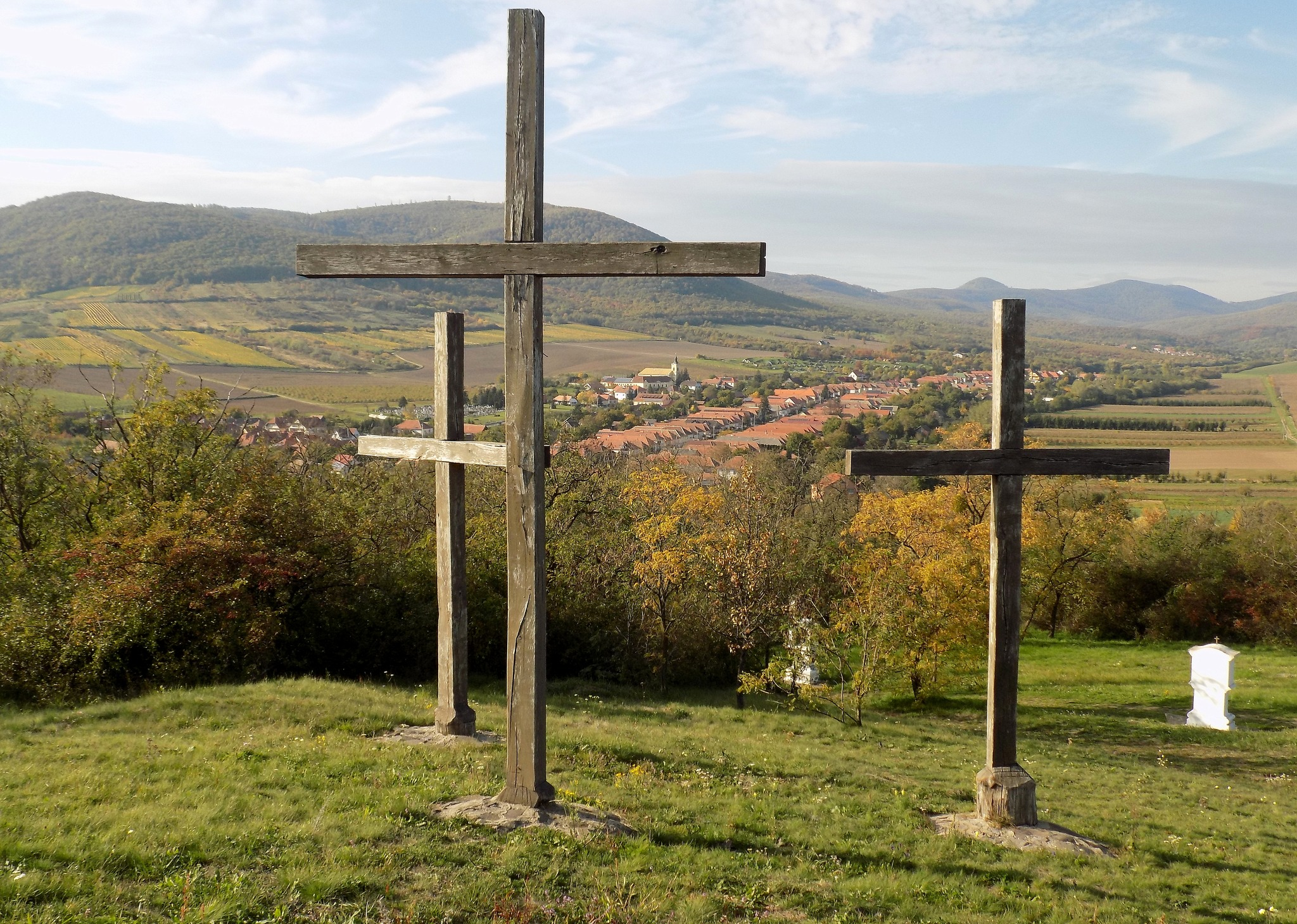
Hercegkút Calvary Hill

According to the 2011 official census, 89.6% of residents identified themselves as Hungarian, 0.2% as Bulgarian, 0.2% as Polish, 55.6% as German, and 0.2% as Slovak. The religious distribution was as follows: Roman Catholic 75.4%, Reformed 6.1%, Greek Catholic 1.1%, Lutheran 0.2%, non-denominational 1.2% (15.8% did not answer).

== German language ==
As a result of the deportations of ethnically German Hungarian citizens by the Soviets following World War II, German is no longer spoken in the village as a first language. The village's Gyöngyszem German-Hungarian Kindergarten and the German-Hungarian Elementary School teach children ages 3–12.

== Gombos Hill and Kőporos cellars ==
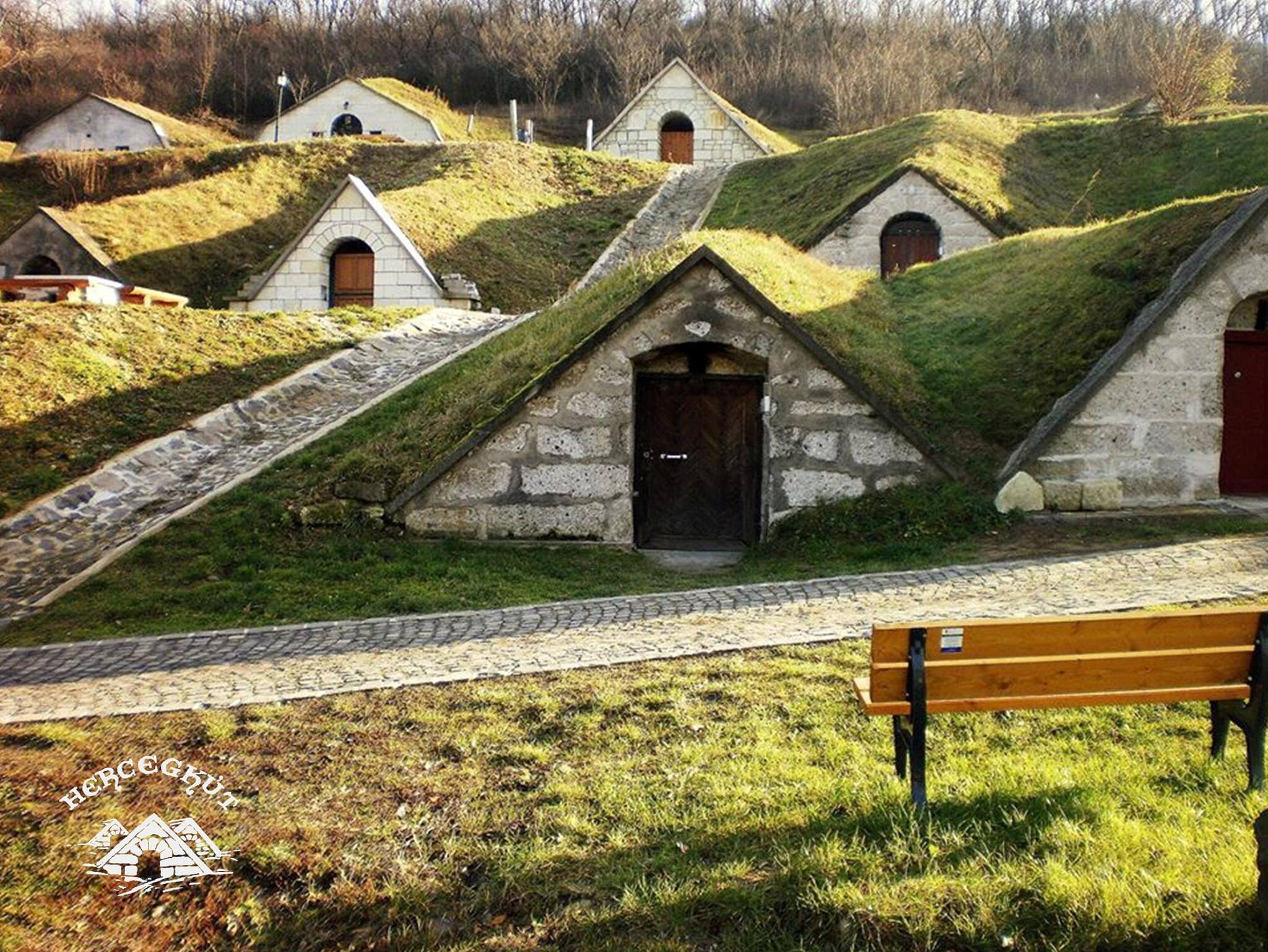
Hercegkút cellars

There are 92 cellars on Gombos-hegy and 87 on Kőporos, in four rows one above the other. In June 2002 UNESCO added them to the World Heritage List in the cultural landscape category as part of the Tokaj Mountains.

== Memorial to the deported ==
In 2015, on the occasion of the 70th anniversary of the deportation of the able bodied population of the village, the village created a memorial site dedicated to the memory of the deported. On January 2, 1945 men and women between the ages of 18 and 35 who were gathered in the yard of the elementary school were taken to the coal mines of today's Ukraine for several years of forced labor. The memorial of two-figure bronze sculptures in the front garden of the school depicts a woman and a man, standing on railways, seem to be connected to each other, but are about to part ways. On the south wall of the school building, a memorial plaque preserves the names of those who were taken away on four granite tablets. Fifteen of the 136 young people who were forcibly separated from their families in 1945 were never able to return home to their village.

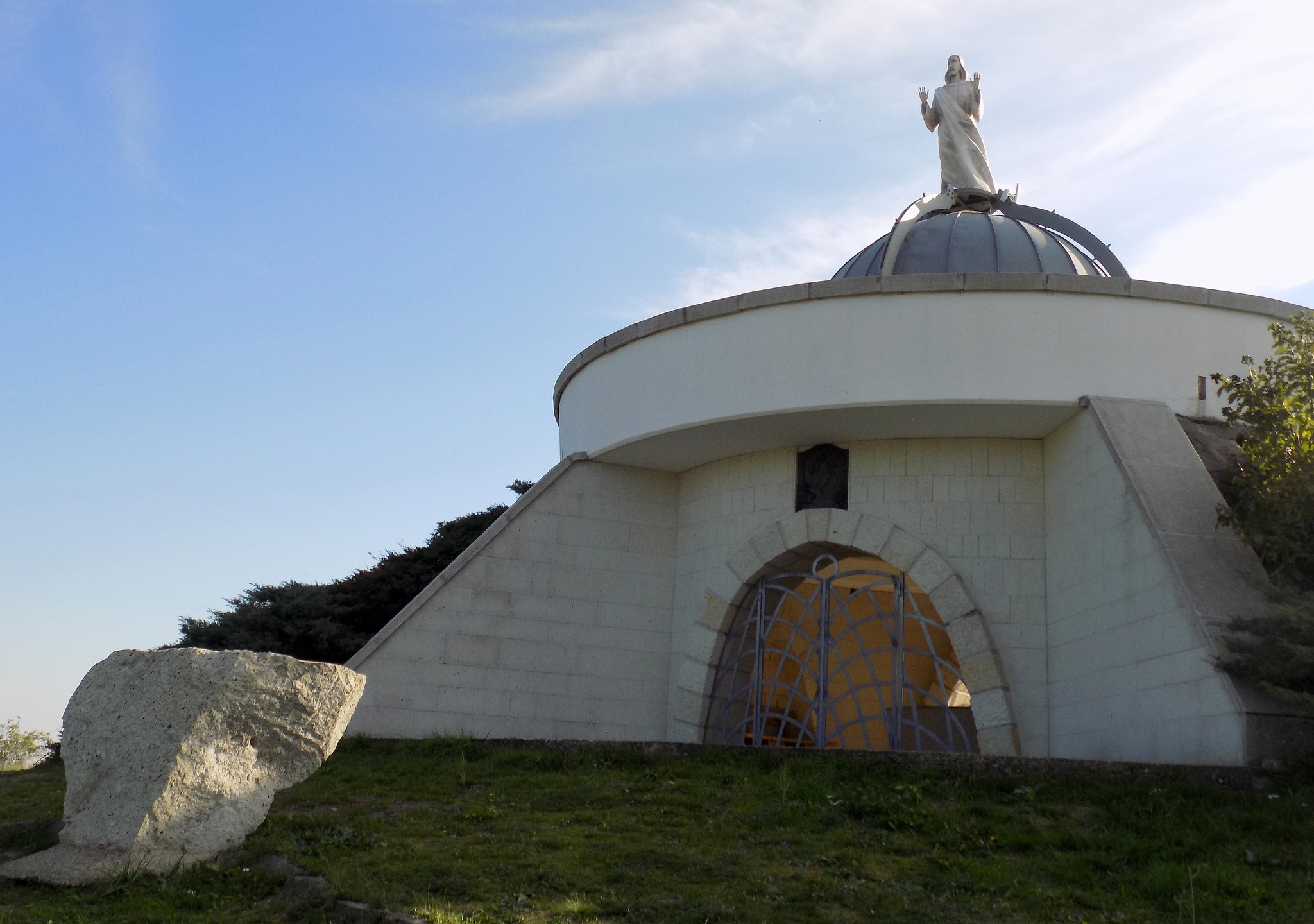
Hercegkút Calvary

== Notable people ==
- István Stumpf (born 1957), Hungarian politician

== Coat of arms ==
A rooster with a round base, floating in an off-white shield, holding a bunch of golden grapes in its beak, above it is a holy figure, a child in one hand, a cross in the other.

== Sister cities ==
- Obersulm (Germany)
- Beaumont-le-Roger (France)

== Weblinks ==
Hercegkút on the i-dest.com sustainable tourism portal
