= Böttingen =

- Municipality
- Coat of arms

- Location of Böttingen within Tuttlingen district
- Interactive map of Böttingen
- Location within Germany Location within Baden-Württemberg
- Coordinates: 48°06′02″N 08°48′17″E
- Country: Germany
- State: Baden-Württemberg
- Admin. region: Freiburg
- District: Tuttlingen

Government
  - Mayor (2024–32): Benedikt Buggle (CDU)

Area
  - Total: 16.31 km^{2} (6.30 sq mi)
- Elevation: 915 m (3,002 ft)

Population (2025-12-31)
  - Total: 1,432
  - Density: 87.80/km^{2} (227.4/sq mi)
- Time zone: UTC+01:00 (CET)
  - Summer (DST): UTC+02:00 (CEST)
- Postal codes: 78583
- Dialling codes: 07429
- Vehicle registration: TUT
- Website: www.boettingen.de

Böttingen is a municipality in the district of Tuttlingen in Baden-Württemberg in Germany. In recent decades it has developed from an agricultural village to an advanced industrial community.

== Geography ==
Böttingen sits on a plateau in the southwestern Swabian Jura in a long dry valley. At an elevation of 911 to 991 meters it was the highest village in the historical Kingdom of Württemberg.

The municipality borders Gosheim to the north, Bubsheim to the northeast, Königsheim to the east, Mahlstetten and Dürbheim to the south, and Balgheim and Denkingen to the West.

The municipality Böttingen consists of the village Böttingen and the Gehöft Allenspacher manor, as well as the abandoned villages Leineburg and Windingen.

== History ==
The first written mention of Böttingen was in 802 and contained a land title grant by the Abbey of Saint Gall. Celtic and Alemanni grave finds as well as flint axes in a cave indicate an earlier Stone Age settlement. After 1253 the territory paid tribute and received protection from the Beuron Archabbey, after a change of ownership the Bishopric of Constance, and then the Herren von Enzberg, until it became part of Württemberg in 1805. It was part of the Oberamt Spaichingen within the Kingdom of Württemberg. The village had to pay interest and tithe as well as socage until 1848.

The Überbündische meeting (in short "ÜT") took place 1977 and 2017 in Allenspach courtyard of the evangelical church youth, Jungenschaft Horte. A total of 3.400 people took part in at least 45 different societies and institutions of scouts and youth movement.

== Sights ==
- The Alter Berg mountain landmark (980 meters above sea level) with a chapel on the summit has a view over the preserved natural landscape of the southwest Swabian Alb. In ideal weather conditions the panorama view includes the Alps. A metal sheet in front of the chapel displays the names of many of the surrounding summits.
- 60 km-long cross-country skiing trail network on the plateau
- Posted hiking trails in multiple directions, in parts within the Donauberglandweg hiking trail network, leading e.g. into the picturesque Danube river valley.

== Notable residents ==
- Bernard Häring, Catholic theologian
- Margret Marquart, theologian and missionary doctor in Uganda and Ghana (died 2004)
