= Gosheim =

- Municipality
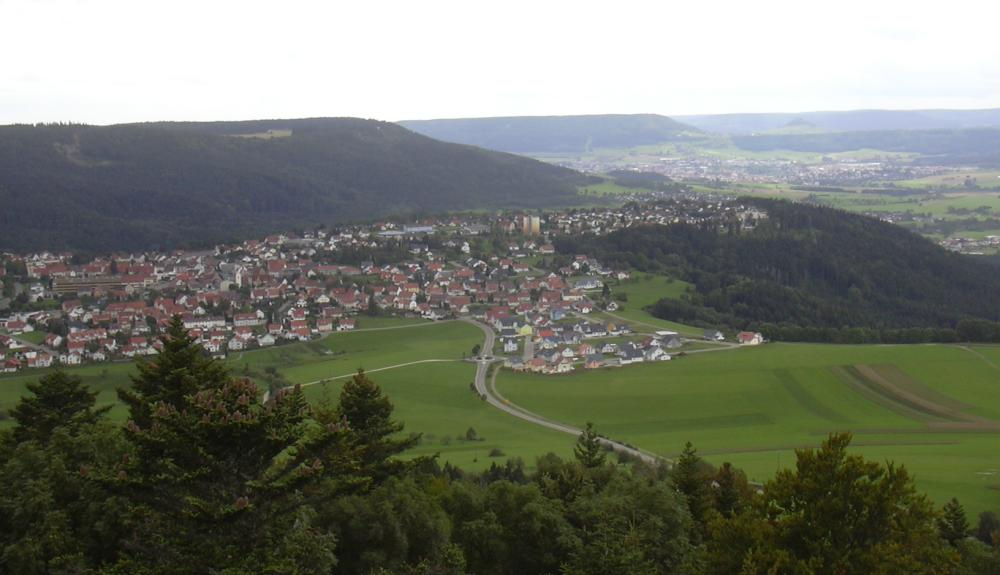
- Gosheim from the Lemberg

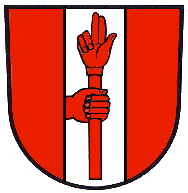
- Coat of arms

- Location of Gosheim within Tuttlingen district
- Interactive map of Gosheim
- Location within Germany Location within Baden-Württemberg
- Coordinates: 48°08′04″N 08°45′28″E
- Country: Germany
- State: Baden-Württemberg
- Admin. region: Freiburg
- District: Tuttlingen

Government
  - Mayor (2018–26): André Kielack

Area
  - Total: 9.32 km^{2} (3.60 sq mi)
- Elevation: 850 m (2,790 ft)

Population (2025-12-31)
  - Total: 3,704
  - Density: 397/km^{2} (1,030/sq mi)
- Time zone: UTC+01:00 (CET)
  - Summer (DST): UTC+02:00 (CEST)
- Postal codes: 78559
- Dialling codes: 07426
- Vehicle registration: TUT
- Website: www.gosheim.de

Gosheim is a municipality in the district of Tuttlingen in Baden-Württemberg in Germany.

== Geography ==
Gosheim lies at the foot of the Lemberg, the highest mountain of Swabian Alps. This mountain, at 1,015 metres (3,330 ft), is the highest peak of the range. It is part of the Heuberg plateau. The town boundary lies on the escarpment.

== Neighboring communities ==
The town is bordered on the north by Deilingen, on the east by Wehingen, on the southeast by Bubsheim and Böttingen, on the south by Denkingen, and on the west by Frittlingen and Wellendingen in the Rottweil district.

=== Community structure ===
The town includes the village of Gosheim and the farmstead of Aumühle.

== History ==
Traces of settlement from the Hallstatt period have been found. Gosheim first appears in 1295 as Gossheim in a charter of Count Albrecht II of Hohenberg. The village was a dependency (Vogtei) of the castle of Wehingen and from 1351 part of Austria. In 1805 the village was transferred to Württemberg. From 1806 to 1938 Gosheim belonged to the oberamt of Spaichingen, and since 1938 to the Tuttlingen district.

During the Second World War British aircraft dropped heavy bombs within Gosheim's borders on 22 February 1945 at 1400 hours. The bombs fell on Wiesental, Jamit, Täli and on the Sturmbühl. The bombs were intended to destroy the Heuberg Railroad, the former railway line. None hit their intended target, but the harvest was destroyed for several years. The bomb craters were 5–6 metres (16–20 ft) deep and have a diameter of 10–12 metres (33–39 ft). Each bomb ejected and scattered 150–200 cubic metres (5,300–7,100 cu ft) of rock. Even today there are still traces visible. It is believed that three unexploded bombs still remain buried in Wiesental.

After the Second World War numerous ethnic German refugees from Yugoslavia settled to the benefit of what was then small industry, which soon expanded rapidly. From around 1970, the increasing demand for labor was met by newly arrived foreign residents, in the beginning mainly from Italy.

Towards the end of the twentieth century most industrial enterprises moved from the center to the outskirts of Gosheim. The necessary land was opened up between the former railway line and the Egartensiedlung and on the Sturmbühl.

== Culture and points of interest ==
Gosheim is affiliated with the tourist association "Donaubergland".

=== Buildings ===
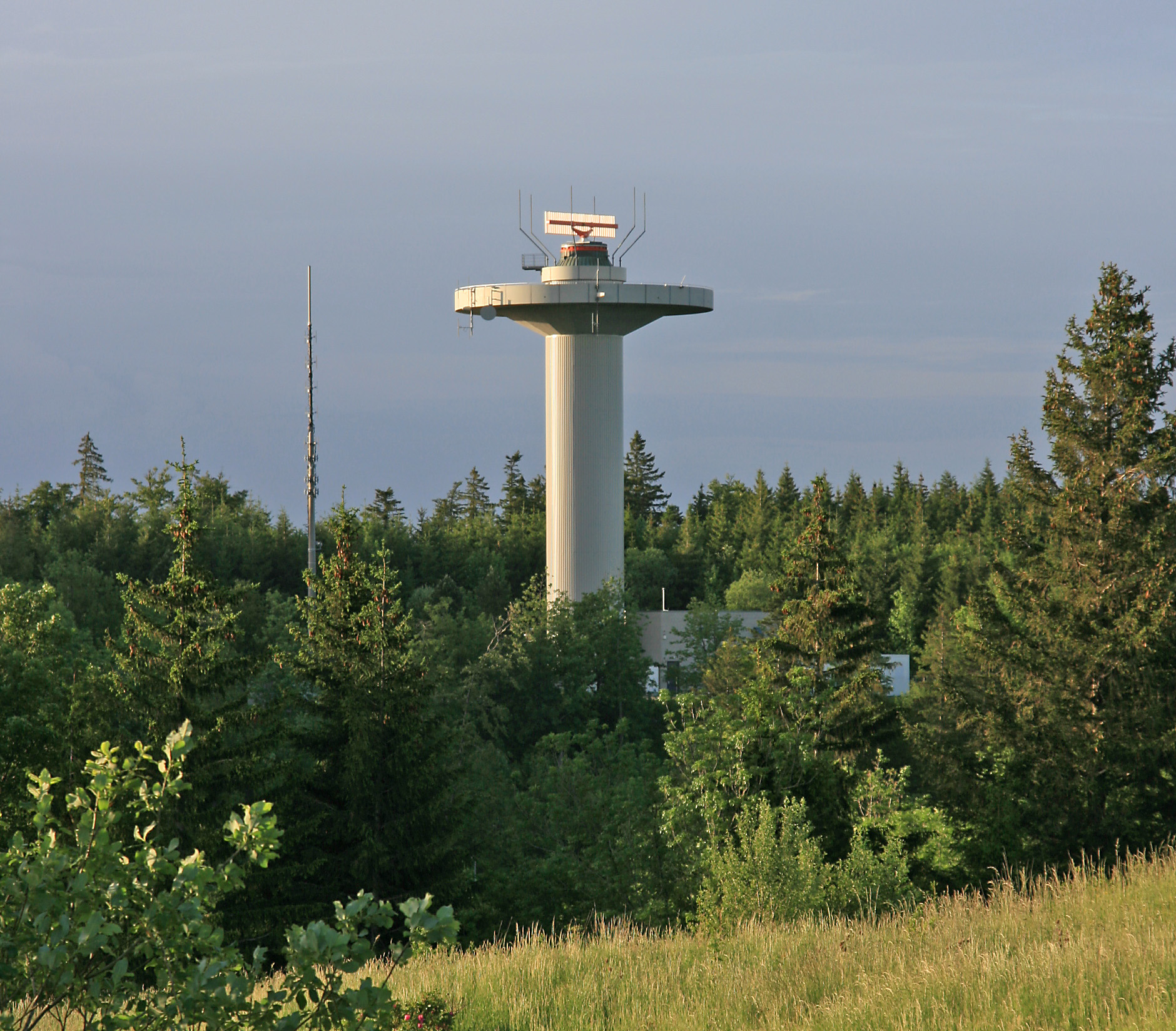
The radar tower on the Hochwald

A 50 metres (160 ft) meter-high radar facility of the German Air Traffic Control (Deutsche Flugsicherung GmbH) is located at an altitude of 1,000 metres (3,300 ft) above sea level in the forest district of Nack. The system was built in 1973-74, and in 1975 was placed in operation by the Bundesanstalt für Flugsicherung. The original red and white ring of 19 m × 6 m (62 ft × 20 ft) parabolic antennas was slightly higher than the observation deck of the Lemberg. Since 1 January 1994, the facility has been owned by Deutsche Flugsicherung. In September 1998, it was replaced by a newer and smaller installation. This system monitors airspace in a radius of 270 kilometres (170 mi). The radar data are automatically transferred to the air traffic controllers in Stuttgart, Karlsruhe, Zurich, Frankfurt, Munich, and Friedrichshafen.

=== Recreation and sports ===
Gosheim has a well-developed network of walking and hiking trails, cross-country ski trails, and a ski slope in winter. The largest recreational facility is the Jurabad, an indoor swimming pool with adjoining sauna and gym. A three court indoor tennis facility of the Heuberg Tennis Club was built in 1988. The Gosheim sports club currently plays in the district league (2013-2014). There are also, among other things, a music club and a choral society.

Gosheim is also home to a biathlon center. The 2 km (1.2 mi) biathlon track circles the radar tower at an average altitude of about 1,000 metres (3,300 ft). The Gosheim Ski Club (SC Gosheim) has produced many talents, such as Simone Hauswald and Kathrin Lang.

== Economy and infrastructure ==
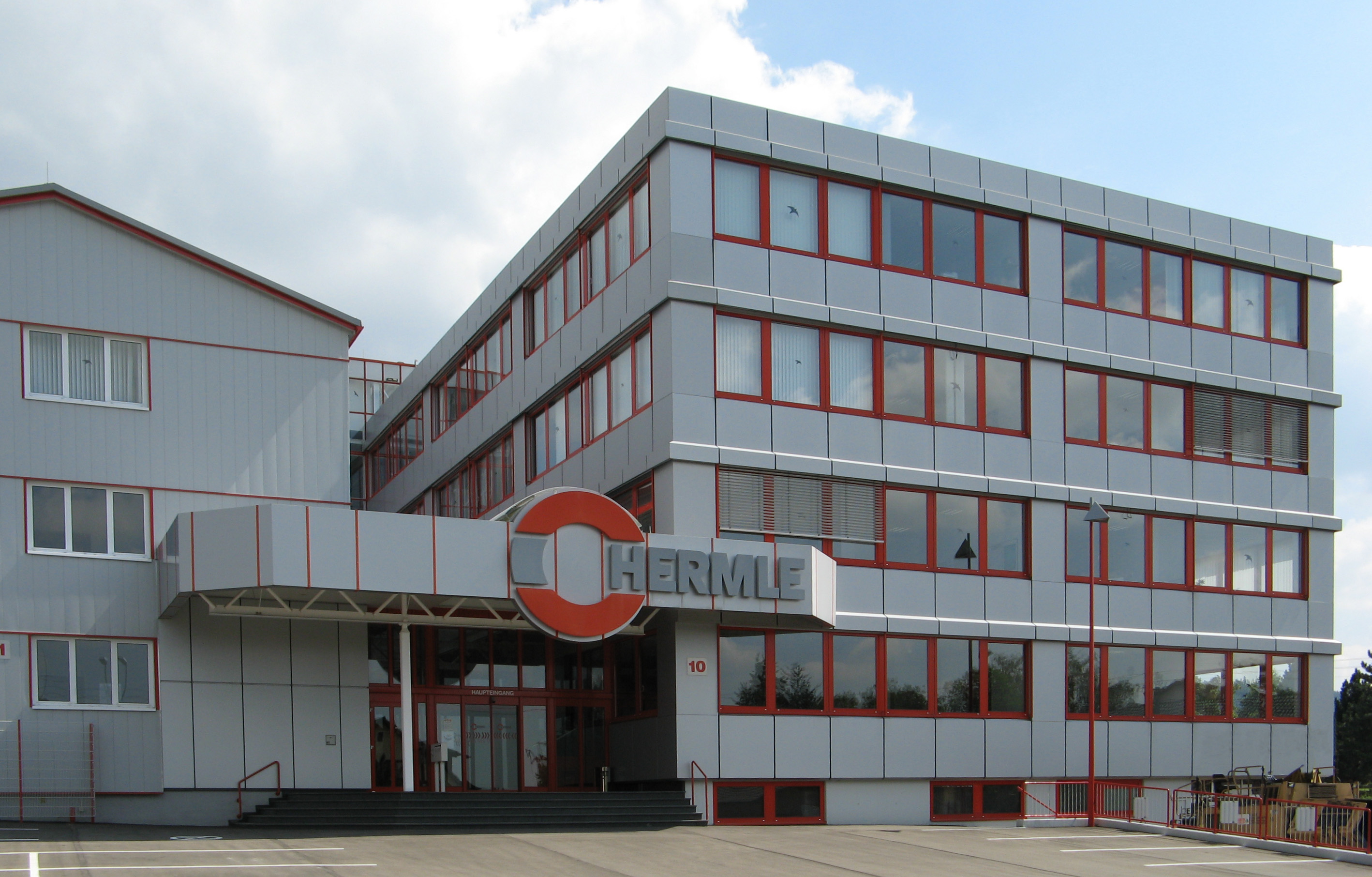
Headquarters of Hermle AG

Gosheim is characterized by numerous small and medium-sized industrial enterprises (mainly metal processing industry, machined parts, and watches) with some 2,500 employees. With a population of approximately 3800, this means that many workers commute daily to Gosheim. The publicly traded company Hermle AG is based in Gosheim.
