= Kesselbach (Danube) =

River in Baden-Württemberg, Germany

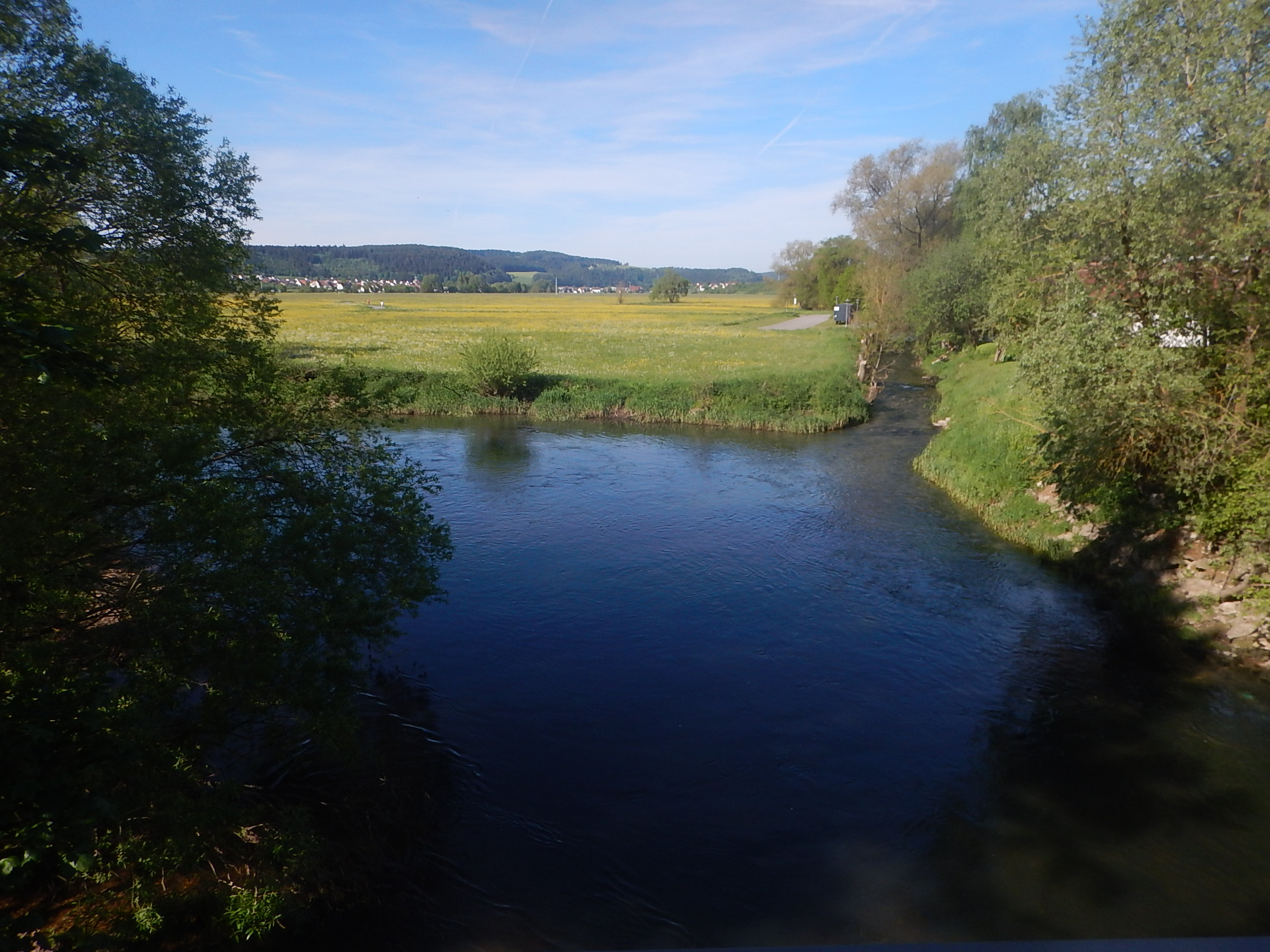
- The mouth of the Kesselbach into the Danube at Stetten

Location
- Country: Germany
- State: Baden-Württemberg

Physical characteristics
- Source
  - location: bifurcation of the Ursentalbach, Nendingen
  - coordinates: 48.0105°N 8.8553°E
  - elevation: 635 m (2,083 ft)
- Mouth
  - location: Danube at Stetten
  - coordinates: 48.0206°N 8.8751°E
  - elevation: 632.9 m (2,076 ft)
- Length: 2.245 km (1.395 mi)
- Basin size: 1.727 km^{2} (0.667 sq mi)

Basin features
- Progression: Danube→ Black Sea

The Kesselbach is a 2.2-kilometre (1.4 mi) river in the district of Tuttlingen in Baden-Württemberg, Germany. A distributary of the Ursentalbach, it branches off near Nendingen and flows to the Danube at Stetten.

== Course ==
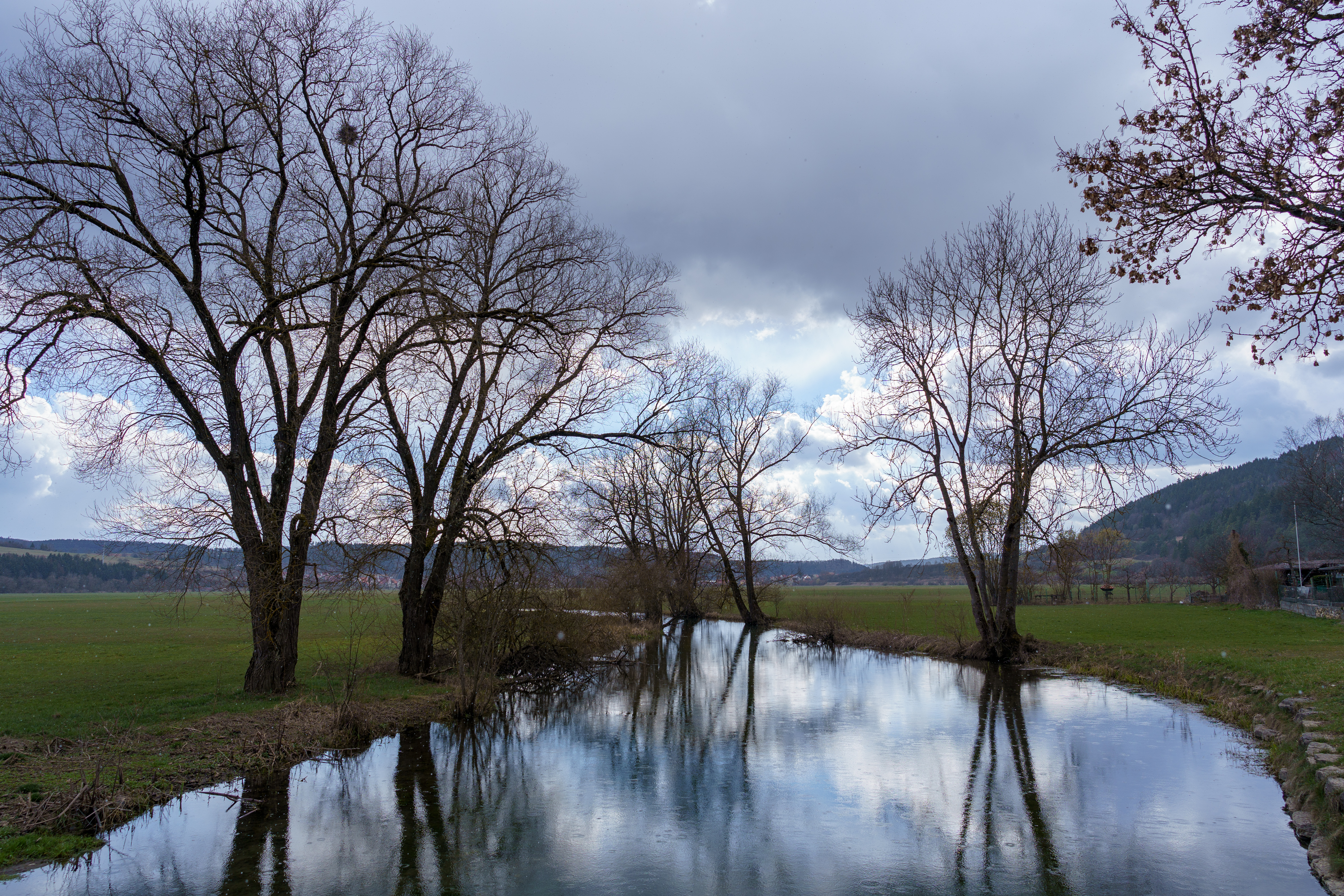
The Kesselbach near Stetten

The Kesselbach forms on the north-eastern edge of Nendingen, where the Ursentalbach passes beneath the Tuttlingen–Inzigkofen railway and divides at a river bifurcation; the Kesselbach branches off to the left as the longer of the two arms, at about 635 metres (2,083 ft) above sea level. It follows the railway north-east as a meadow ditch for some 1.5 kilometres (0.93 mi) to the edge of Stetten, gathering small spring-fed brooks from the slope of the Bräunisberg, then turns south-east and joins the Danube from the left at the Stetten bridge, at about 632.9 metres (2,076 ft), after a course of 2.245 kilometres (1.395 mi). Its drainage basin, measured from the bifurcation, covers 1.727 square kilometres (0.667 sq mi). If the Kesselbach were counted as the lower course of the Ursentalbach rather than the shorter official channel, that stream would measure about 5.6 kilometres (3.5 mi).

The catchment lies within the Upper Danube Nature Park and forms part of the Natura 2000 habitats site Donautal und Hochflächen von Tuttlingen bis Beuron ('Danube valley and uplands from Tuttlingen to Beuron').

== See also ==
- List of rivers of Baden-Württemberg
