= Reichenbach am Heuberg =

- Municipality
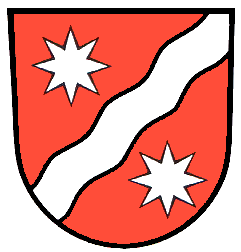
- Coat of arms

- Location of Reichenbach am Heuberg within Tuttlingen district
- Interactive map of Reichenbach am Heuberg
- Location within Germany Location within Baden-Württemberg
- Coordinates: 48°07′57″N 08°50′32″E
- Country: Germany
- State: Baden-Württemberg
- Admin. region: Freiburg
- District: Tuttlingen

Government
  - Mayor (2019–27): Hans Marquardt

Area
  - Total: 6.10 km^{2} (2.36 sq mi)
- Elevation: 748 m (2,454 ft)

Population (2025-12-31)
  - Total: 448
  - Density: 73.4/km^{2} (190/sq mi)
- Time zone: UTC+01:00 (CET)
  - Summer (DST): UTC+02:00 (CEST)
- Postal codes: 78564
- Dialling codes: 07429
- Vehicle registration: TUT

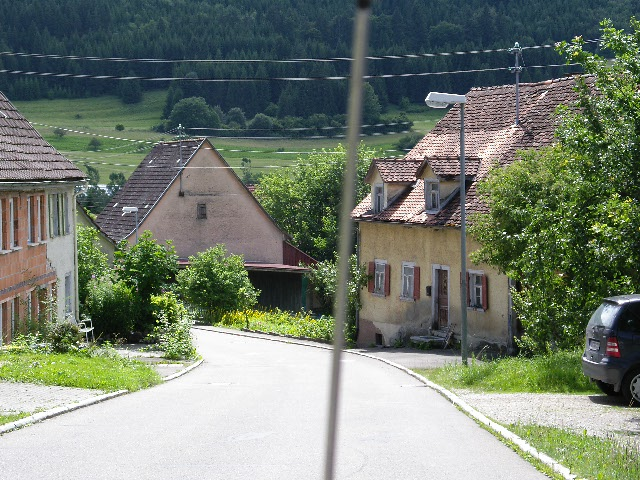
Reichenbach am Heuberg

Reichenbach is a municipality in the district of Tuttlingen in Baden-Württemberg in Germany.

== Geography ==
Reichenbach lies on the Heuberg Plateau, a high plateau in the south of the Swabian Jura. The Lower Bära river flows through the town. Additionally a small tributary, called the Reichenbach or Talbach, runs through the town and empties into the Bära.

== Neighboring communities ==
Reichenbach is bounded on the north by Obernheim, on the east by Nusplingen, both in the Zollernalbkreis. On the southeast it borders on Egesheim, in the southwest on Bubsheim, and on the northwest on Wehingen.

== Community structure ==
The community of Reichenbach consists of the village of Reichenbach am Heuberg and the hamlet of Holzwiesen.

== History ==
Reichenbach first appears in written records in the year 793. The village belonged to the County of Hohenberg. In the year 1391 it became part of Further Austria, where it remained until it became part of Württemberg.

Between 1928 and 1966 Reichenbach was a terminus of the Heuberg Railroad. At one time a farming village it has now become an industrial and residential community.

== Culture and tourism ==
Reichenbach is affiliated with the tourist association "Donaubergland".

The rococo Catholic parish church of St. Nikolaus is home to a little known organ of the master organ builder Hieronymus Spiegel.
