= Egesheim =

- Municipality
- Coat of arms

- Location of Egesheim within Tuttlingen district
- Interactive map of Egesheim
- Location within Germany Location within Baden-Württemberg
- Coordinates: 48°07′01″N 08°51′21″E
- Country: Germany
- State: Baden-Württemberg
- Admin. region: Freiburg
- District: Tuttlingen

Government
  - Mayor (2018–26): Hans Marquart

Area
  - Total: 7.66 km^{2} (2.96 sq mi)
- Elevation: 783 m (2,569 ft)

Population (2025-12-31)
  - Total: 631
  - Density: 82.4/km^{2} (213/sq mi)
- Time zone: UTC+01:00 (CET)
  - Summer (DST): UTC+02:00 (CEST)
- Postal codes: 78592
- Dialling codes: 07429
- Vehicle registration: TUT
- Website: www.egesheim.de

Egesheim is a town in the district of Tuttlingen in Baden-Württemberg in Germany.

== Geography ==
Egesheim lies on the Heuberg Plateau in the southwest of the Swabian Jura at an altitude of between 700 metres (2,300 ft) and 930 metres (3,050 ft) above sea level. The southern branch of the Bära river flows through the town. Approximately two-thirds of the area is forest.

Egesheim has a part of the Galgenwiesen nature reserve in the southeast. The municipality also includes several parts of the Großer Heuberg and Donautal FFH area, and the Westerberg belongs to the Eastern Großer Heuberg FFH area. The majority of the municipality's area also belongs to the Südwestalb and Oberes Donautal bird sanctuary . Egesheim is located in the Upper Danube Nature Park.

== History ==
The Heidentor is a celtic place of worship. The town is one of the oldest communities in the region, In 770 it is mentioned in a deed of donation of the Abbey of Saint Gall. Various religious and secular lordships have claimed ownership. In 1381 the village became a domain of Further Austria, and remained so until 1805, when it became part of Württemberg.

In the Kingdom of Württemberg, which began in 1806, the village was assigned to the Spaichingen district. The territory was reformed during Nazi Germany, and the village became part of the Tuttlingen district in 1938. In 1945, Egesheim became part of the French occupation zone and thus part of the post-war state of Württemberg-Hohenzollern, which was incorporated into the federal state of Baden-Württemberg in 1952, which it remains a part of today.

=== Mayors ===
A timeline of the mayors of Egesheim.

- 1832–1869: Leonhard Reiser (1801–1875)
- 1869–1879: Josef Sauter (1842–1900), farmer
- 1879–1907: Johann Baptist Blikle (1842–1913), carpenter
- 1908–1931: Jakob Keller (1868–1950), bookbinder
- 1931–1945: Franz Josef Sauter (1894–1967), carpenter
- 1946–1952: Josef Paul (1896–1983)
- 1952–1970: Gallus Stier (1914–1990), farmer and sawyer
- 1970–1982: Eugen Weber (1915–1987), previously mayor of Gosheim 1949–1967
- 1982–2018: Josef Bär (* 1952, CDU), graduate in public administration (FH), also mayor of Wehingen 1981–2016 and Reichenbach am Heuberg 1988–2019
- Since 2018: Hans Marquart (* 1959, independent), also mayor of Reichenbach am Heuberg since 2019; graduate in business administration, 2002–2018 economic development officer of the city of Hechingen

== Demographics ==
As of 2011, Egesheim is estimated to have a population of around 643.

It has an area of 7.66 square kilometres (2.96 sq mi), with a population density of around 84 people per square kilometre.

=== Religion ===
Egesheim has a traditional Catholic character. The parish church was originally a Gothic building; It was remodeled in the Rococo style between 1758 and 1762 and has been renovated several times since then. The Roman Catholic parish of the Assumption of Mary in Egesheim belongs to the Oberer Heuberg pastoral unit in the Tuttlingen-Spaichingen deanery of the Rottenburg-Stuttgart diocese.
