= Geislingen, Zollernalbkreis =

Geislingen
- Town
- Coat of arms

- Location of Geislingen within Zollernalbkreis district
- Interactive map of Geislingen
- Location within Germany Location within Baden-Württemberg
- Coordinates: 48°17′15″N 08°48′45″E
- Country: Germany
- State: Baden-Württemberg
- Admin. region: Tübingen
- District: Zollernalbkreis
- Subdivisions: 3 Stadtteile

Government
  - Mayor (2023–31): Oliver Schmid (Ind.)

Area
  - Total: 31.96 km^{2} (12.34 sq mi)
- Elevation: 563 m (1,847 ft)

Population (2025-12-31)
  - Total: 5,905
  - Density: 184.8/km^{2} (478.5/sq mi)
- Time zone: UTC+01:00 (CET)
  - Summer (DST): UTC+02:00 (CEST)
- Postal codes: 72349–72351
- Dialling codes: 07433 / 07428
- Vehicle registration: BL / HCH
- Website: www.stadt-geislingen.de

Geislingen (German pronunciation: [ˈɡaɪslɪŋən]) is a town in the Zollernalbkreis district of Baden-Württemberg, Germany. It is situated 4 km (2.5 mi) northwest of Balingen.

== History ==
The area has been continuously settled since the Stone Age. The first recorded mention of Binsdorf dates to 834, and Geislingen was officially documented in 1188.

In 1764, Carl von Ulm zu Erbach issued the Decretum für das Amt Beeder Herrschaften Werenwag und Callenberg ("Decree for the Office of the Two Lordships of Werenwag and Callenberg"), addressing poverty and supporting textile production.

Under Württemberg rule, an alley of fruit trees was planted as an easement, with orchards managed by William I of Württemberg and the Moravian Church providing free fruit. By 1863, the orchards produced a variety of apples and pears, including traditional regional cultivars such as Luiken, Winterling, and Fleiner apples; baking pears, sugar pears, and green pears; as well as heritage varieties like the Goldparmäne, rose apples, and leather-skinned apples. Other locally named types included "little bell" and "little cask" pears (Glöcklesbirnen, Fäßlesbirnen), broadlings (Breitlinge), and Bergamot pears.

In 1941, a protest occurred in Geislingen against the Nazi Party.

In 1990, a fruit tree arboretum was established in Erlaheim.

== Economy ==
Geislingen's economy historically included mining of sand, sandstone, limestone, jet, and iron ore. The Goldhöhle mine near Mildersbach in Erlaheim yielded pyrite but later collapsed. Binsdorf had a natural stone quarry. Geislingen in particular was known for jet production, derived from Posidonia Shale.

Informational panels near the Goldhöhle were sponsored by the Kreissparkasse. A local tale references a figure known as the "Sandman" (Sandmann), a hawker of cleaning sand, an idea attributed to the Schwäbischer Albverein in Binsdorf. Wood from a 3.5 km (2.2 mi) mine in the Doggererzflöz near Weilheim is displayed in the granary museum (Fruchtkasten) in Tuttlingen.

A steelworks operated in Tuttlingen by the Schwäbische Hüttenwerke in Ludwigstal. The refinery at Harras closed in 1832 due to the inefficiency of horse transport. Later, economic reforms and railway expansion rendered local iron ore mining unprofitable.

Black shale was mined for Operation Desert near Erzingen.

Today the local economy combines agriculture, services, and small-scale industry.

== Demographics ==
Geislingen has a population of roughly 6,000. It includes three districts: Geislingen (pop. 4,500), Erlaheim (pop. 500), and Binsdorf (pop. 1,000), each growing at about 1% annually.

Many residents commute to industrial zones south of Stuttgart or to nearby Balingen.

== Notable people ==
- Michael Sattler, a leader of the Anabaptist movement in the early 16th century, was imprisoned in the tower of Binsdorf before being executed in Rottenburg am Neckar.
- Anna Funck, born in Erlaheim, was burned as a witch in 1587.
