= Balgheim =

- Municipality
- Coat of arms

- Location of Balgheim within Tuttlingen district
- Interactive map of Balgheim
- Location within Germany Location within Baden-Württemberg
- Coordinates: 48°04′N 08°46′E
- Country: Germany
- State: Baden-Württemberg
- Admin. region: Freiburg
- District: Tuttlingen

Government
  - Mayor (2019–27): Nathanael Schwarz

Area
  - Total: 7.61 km^{2} (2.94 sq mi)
- Elevation: 700 m (2,300 ft)

Population (2025-12-31)
  - Total: 1,331
  - Density: 175/km^{2} (453/sq mi)
- Time zone: UTC+01:00 (CET)
  - Summer (DST): UTC+02:00 (CEST)
- Postal codes: 78582
- Dialling codes: 07424
- Vehicle registration: TUT
- Website: www.balgheim.de

Balgheim is a municipality in the district of Tuttlingen in Baden-Württemberg in Germany.

== Geography ==
Balgheim lies in a basin on the edge of the Baar at the foot of the Swabian Jura and the Dreifaltigkeitsberg (Holy Trinity Mountain). The European Watershed, the divide between the Rhine and Danube watersheds, occurs in the town's territory. The source of the Prim, which joins the Neckar (a tributary of the Rhine) in Rottweil, is located only a kilometer away from the source of the Faulenbach, an eventual tributary of the Danube, in neighboring Dürbheim.

Balgheim is bordered by Böttingen to the north, Dürbheim to the southeast, Rietheim-Weilheim to the south, and the city Spaichingen to the west.

== History ==
Tombs dating from the Merovingian dynasty indicate that Balgheim was founded in the 6th or 7th century. It was first mentioned in writing in 1113. In 1420 it was sold to the Free Imperial City Rottweil, where it remained until 1689, after which its rule changed often until it became part of Württemberg in 1806.

== Politics ==
Balgheim belongs to the Amt Spaichingen.

== Transportation ==
The Bundesstraße 14 (federal highway) between Rottweil and Tuttlingen passes by the east edge of Balgheim. The Plochingen–Immendingen railway passes over the European Watershed here. On workdays the Ringzug (train) provides hourly connections to Rottweil, Tuttlingen and Geisingen-Leiferdingen.
