= Hausen ob Verena =

- Municipality
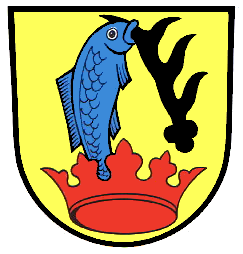
- Coat of arms

- Location of Hausen ob Verena within Tuttlingen district
- Interactive map of Hausen ob Verena
- Location within Germany Location within Baden-Württemberg
- Coordinates: 48°03′14″N 08°43′30″E
- Country: Germany
- State: Baden-Württemberg
- Admin. region: Freiburg
- District: Tuttlingen

Government
  - Mayor (2023–31): Wolfgang Klaiber

Area
  - Total: 5.87 km^{2} (2.27 sq mi)
- Elevation: 806 m (2,644 ft)

Population (2025-12-31)
  - Total: 843
  - Density: 144/km^{2} (372/sq mi)
- Time zone: UTC+01:00 (CET)
  - Summer (DST): UTC+02:00 (CEST)
- Postal codes: 78595
- Dialling codes: 07424
- Vehicle registration: TUT
- Website: www.hausen-ob-verena.de

Hausen ob Verena (sometimes also just referred to as Hausen) is a municipality in the district of Tuttlingen in Baden-Württemberg in Germany.

== Geography ==
=== Geographical location ===
Hausen ob Verena lies on the edge of the Baar plateau at the foot of the Swabian Alb between 740 and 860 m above sea level, a good ten kilometers northwest of the district town of Tuttlingen and two kilometers southwest of Spaichingen. The 912-metre-high Hohenkarpfen is located in the municipality.

=== Neighboring municipalities ===
The municipality borders the town of Spaichingen to the north, Rietheim-Weilheim to the east, Seitingen-Oberflacht to the south and Gunningen to the west.

=== Community structure ===
The municipality of Hausen ob Verena includes the village of Hausen ob Verena, the Hohenkarpfen farmstead and the house "Hausener Mühle".

== Politics ==
The current mayor of Hausen ob Verena is Wolfgang Klaiber, elected in December 2023. He succeeded Jochen Arno, who was also additionally mayor of Rietheim-Weilheim from 2007 to 2023. In office since February 2016, he was elected on 6 December 2015, succeeding Gustav Schlecht. Of the 619 eligible voters, 344 (55%) voted, of which 334 (92.5%) voted for Arno.

The most recent mayoral election was held on 3 December 2023, to decide Arno's successor. 478 (72%) of the 661 eligible voters voted. The results were as follows:

Candidate	Result	
Candidate	Votes	%
Wolfgang Klaiber	240	50.6
Jochen Arno	151	33.5
Thomas Zeller	38	8
Eugen Kapustinski	35	7.3
Invalid votes	4	0.6
Total votes	478	100

== History ==
Hausen ob Verena was first mentioned in a document from the year 1092. It was part of the Oberamt of Tuttlingen until 1806, and then part of Oberamt Spaichingen until 1938. Following the abolition of the Spaichingen Oberamt in 1938, Hausen ob Verena was incorporated into the Tuttlingen district.
