= Emmingen-Liptingen =

- Municipality
- Coat of arms

- Location of Emmingen-Liptingen within Tuttlingen district
- Interactive map of Emmingen-Liptingen
- Location within Germany Location within Baden-Württemberg
- Coordinates: 47°55′52″N 08°51′02″E
- Country: Germany
- State: Baden-Württemberg
- Admin. region: Freiburg
- District: Tuttlingen

Government
  - Mayor (2016–24): Joachim Löffler

Area
  - Total: 54.57 km^{2} (21.07 sq mi)
- Elevation: 772 m (2,533 ft)

Population (2025-12-31)
  - Total: 4,886
  - Density: 89.54/km^{2} (231.9/sq mi)
- Time zone: UTC+01:00 (CET)
  - Summer (DST): UTC+02:00 (CEST)
- Postal codes: 78576
- Dialling codes: 07465
- Vehicle registration: TUT
- Website: www.emmingen-liptingen.de

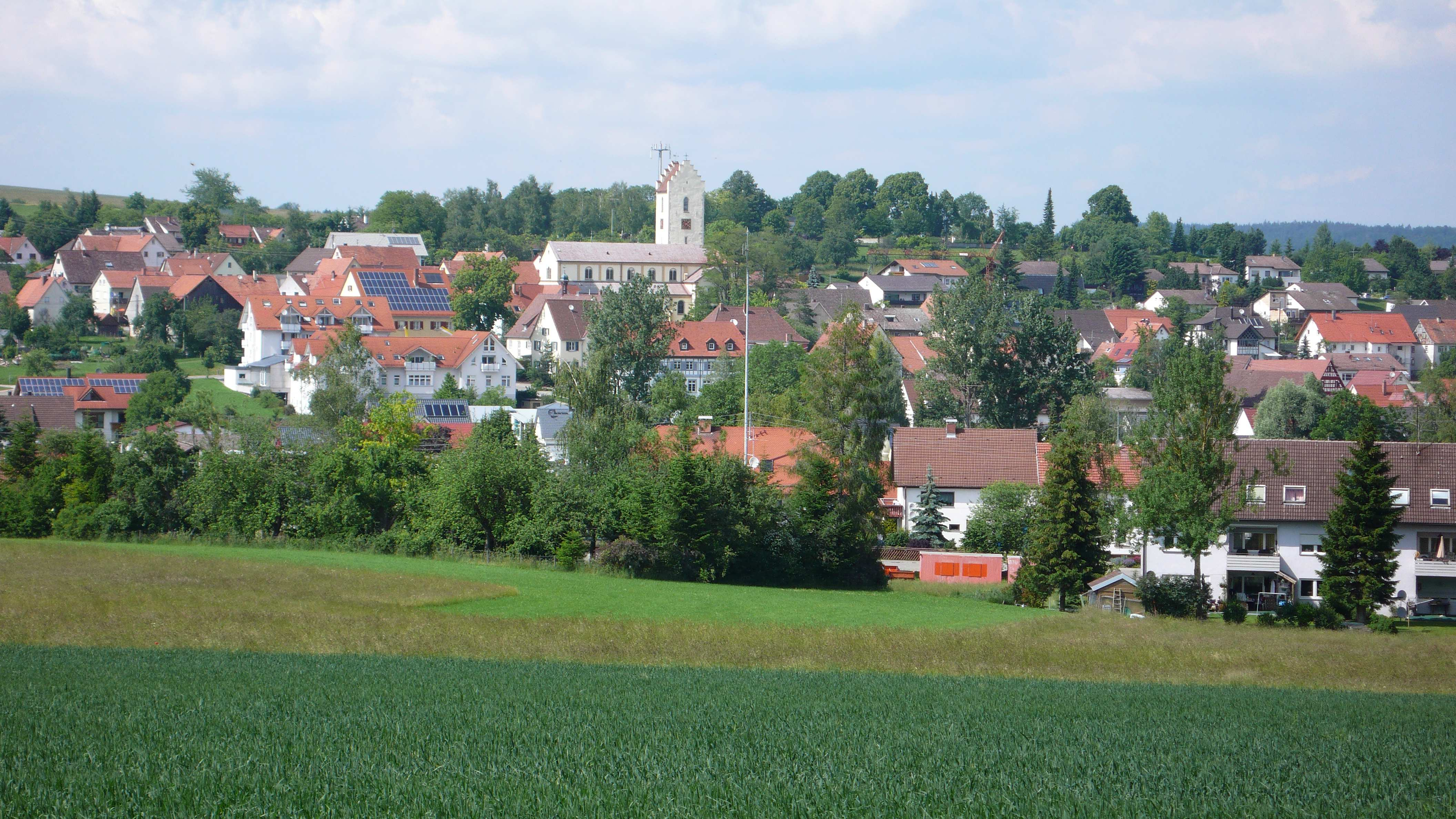
Emmingen-Liptingen

Emmingen-Liptingen is a town in the district of Tuttlingen in Baden-Württemberg in Germany.

== History ==
Emmingen was first mentioned in 820, Liptingen in 761. The municipalities were combined in 1975.

== Mayor ==
Since 1992: Joachim Löffler.

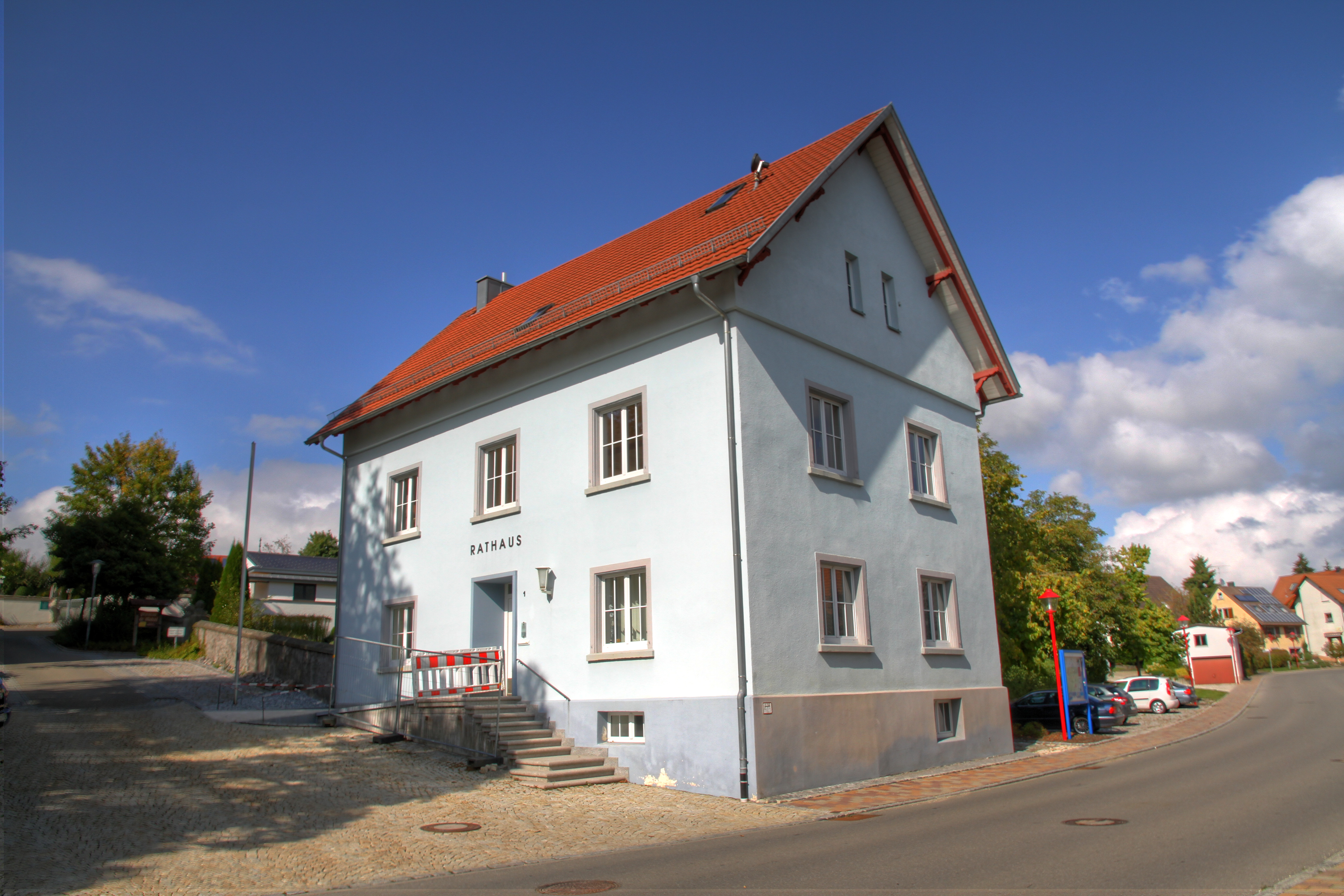
Town hall Liptingen
