= Wurmlingen =

- Municipality
- Coat of arms

- Location of Wurmlingen within Tuttlingen district
- Interactive map of Wurmlingen
- Location within Germany Location within Baden-Württemberg
- Coordinates: 48°00′12″N 08°46′35″E
- Country: Germany
- State: Baden-Württemberg
- Admin. region: Freiburg
- District: Tuttlingen

Government
  - Mayor (2018–26): Klaus Schellenberg

Area
  - Total: 15.43 km^{2} (5.96 sq mi)
- Elevation: 665 m (2,182 ft)

Population (2025-12-31)
  - Total: 3,990
  - Density: 259/km^{2} (670/sq mi)
- Time zone: UTC+01:00 (CET)
  - Summer (DST): UTC+02:00 (CEST)
- Postal codes: 78573
- Dialling codes: 07461
- Vehicle registration: TUT
- Website: www.wurmlingen.de

Wurmlingen is a municipality in the district of Tuttlingen in Baden-Württemberg in Germany.

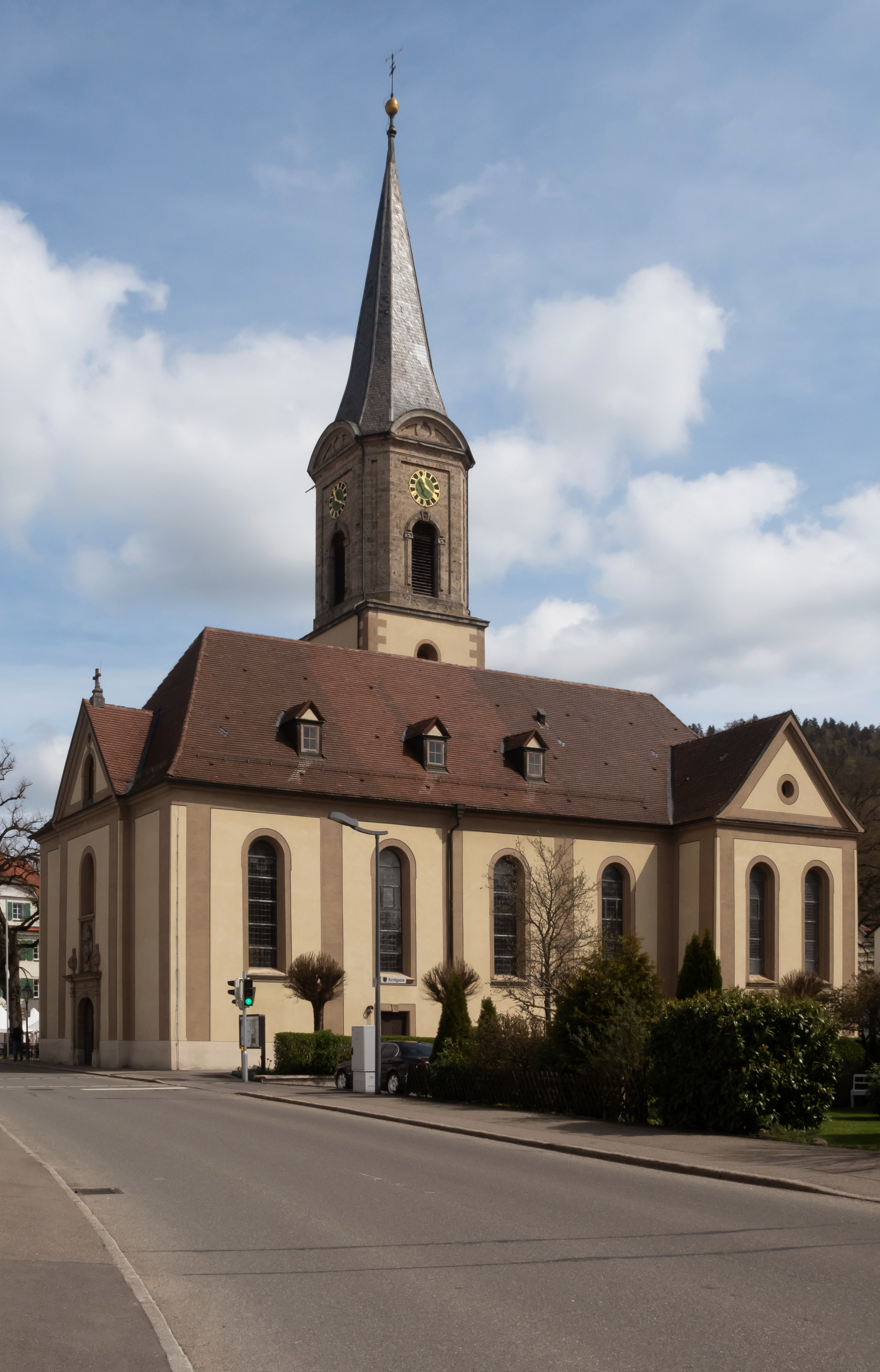
Wurmlingen, church: Sankt Galluskirche
