= Kolbingen =

- Municipality
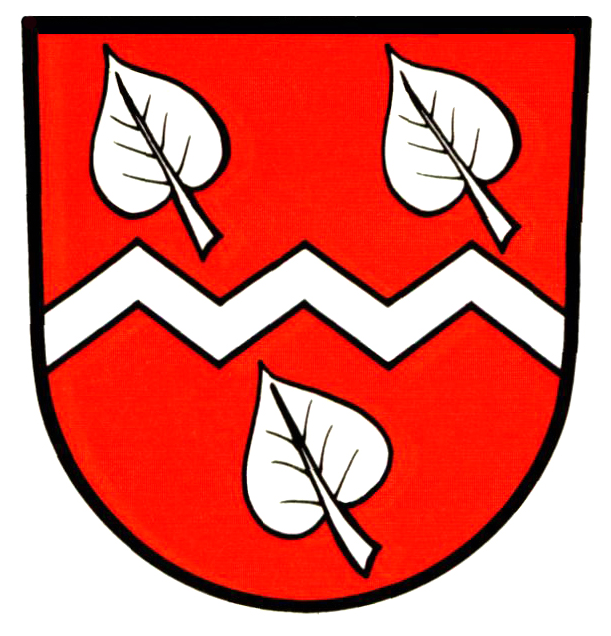
- Coat of arms

- Location of Kolbingen within Tuttlingen district
- Interactive map of Kolbingen
- Location within Germany Location within Baden-Württemberg
- Coordinates: 48°03′08″N 08°53′20″E
- Country: Germany
- State: Baden-Württemberg
- Admin. region: Freiburg
- District: Tuttlingen

Government
  - Mayor (2021–29): Christian Valentin Abert

Area
  - Total: 16.49 km^{2} (6.37 sq mi)
- Elevation: 854 m (2,802 ft)

Population (2025-12-31)
  - Total: 1,238
  - Density: 75.08/km^{2} (194.4/sq mi)
- Time zone: UTC+01:00 (CET)
  - Summer (DST): UTC+02:00 (CEST)
- Postal codes: 78600
- Dialling codes: 07463
- Vehicle registration: TUT
- Website: www.kolbingen.de

Kolbingen is a municipality in the district of Tuttlingen in Baden-Württemberg in Germany. It is situated about 15 km northeast of Tuttlingen and 7 km from Mühlheim an der Donau.

== Demographics ==
Population development:

| Year | Inhabitants |
|---|---|
| 1990 | 1,113 |
| 2001 | 1,286 |
| 2011 | 1,253 |
| 2021 | 1,240 |

== Farming ==
To help people to help themselves Württemberg planted alleys of fruit-trees (Dienstbarkeit on private ground near streets). The tree farms from William I of Württemberg, also the Brüdergemeinde delivered for free. The Kolbinger Goldbirne is a local tree.
