= Irndorf =

- Municipality
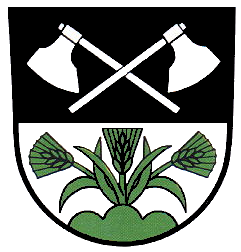
- Coat of arms

- Location of Irndorf within Tuttlingen district
- Interactive map of Irndorf
- Location within Germany Location within Baden-Württemberg
- Coordinates: 48°03′59″N 08°58′22″E
- Country: Germany
- State: Baden-Württemberg
- Admin. region: Freiburg
- District: Tuttlingen

Government
  - Mayor (2024–32): Thomas Blazko

Area
  - Total: 14.56 km^{2} (5.62 sq mi)
- Elevation: 820 m (2,690 ft)

Population (2025-12-31)
  - Total: 661
  - Density: 45.4/km^{2} (118/sq mi)
- Time zone: UTC+01:00 (CET)
  - Summer (DST): UTC+02:00 (CEST)
- Postal codes: 78597
- Dialling codes: 07466
- Vehicle registration: TUT
- Website: www.irndorf.de

Irndorf is a municipality in the district of Tuttlingen in Baden-Württemberg in Germany.
