= Josef Markwart =

German historian and orientalist (1864–1930)

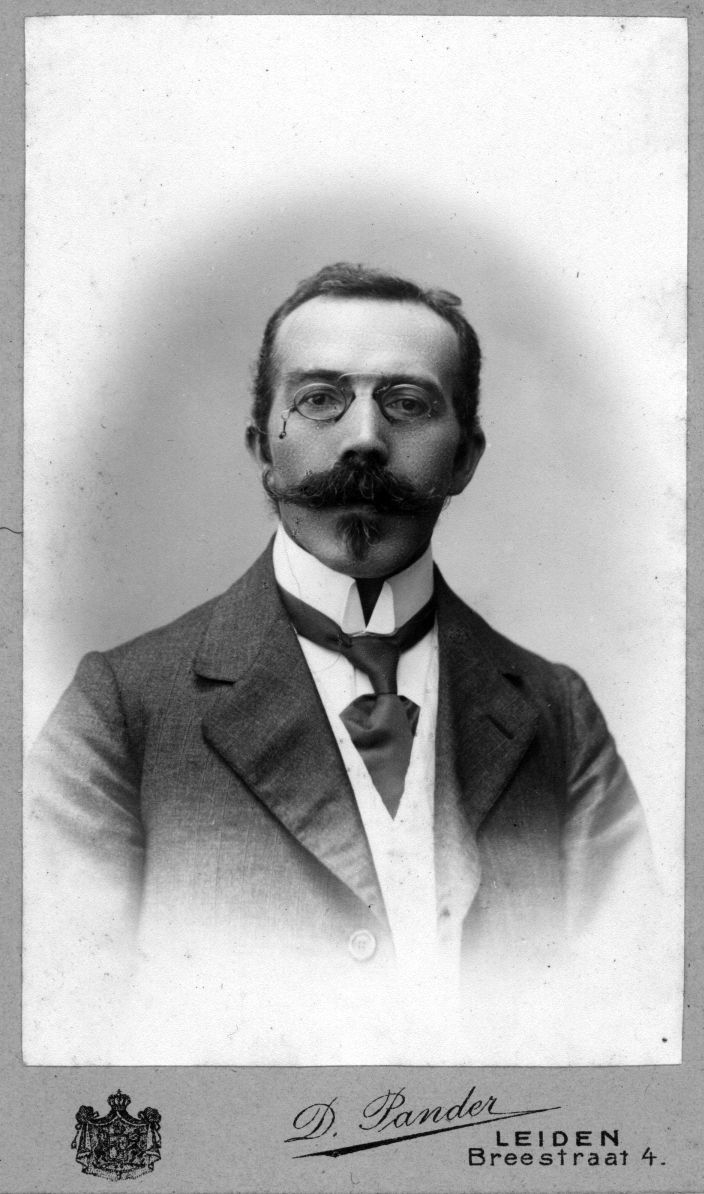
Josef Markwart, Leiden

Josef Markwart (originally spelled Josef Marquart: December 9, 1864 in Reichenbach am Heuberg – February 4, 1930 in Berlin) was a German historian and orientalist. He specialized in Turkish and Iranian Studies and the history of the Middle East.

The Encyclopædia Iranica wrote that "His books are full of profound and nearly inexhaustible erudition, revealing that their author was a learned historian, philologist, geographer, and ethnologist." The encyclopedia cited his 1901 book Ērānšahr as "still an authoritative work and probably his most important."

== Biography ==
He attended Tübingen University in Germany, where he studied Catholic theology, and then later switched his studies to classical philology and history. In 1889 he worked as an assistant to Eugen Prym, an orientalist author. His doctoral thesis Assyriaka des Ktesias was accepted and he graduated in 1892. In 1897 he began as a lecturer in ancient history.

In 1900 he moved to Leiden, The Netherlands and became a curator at the Museum Volkenkunde (Ethnographical Museum).

In 1902 he was appointed to the position of assistant professor for languages of the Christian Orient at Leiden University. In 1912 he moved to Berlin and became a full Professor of Iranian and Armenian studies at Berlin University. He taught in Berlin for the remainder of his life, even giving a noon lecture on the day of his death in 1930.

In 1922 he changed his last name from "Marquart" to "Markwart". The Encyclopædia Iranica stated that this paralleled "his tendency to make use of an idiosyncratic orthography in his writings."

His most famous pupil was the Italian Orientalist Giuseppe Messina.

== Works ==
- Ērānšahr nach der Geographie des Ps. Moses Xoranacʽi (1901)
- Osteuropäische und ostasiatische Streifzüge (1903, reprinted 1961)
- Südarmenien und die Tigrisquellen (1930)
- A catalogue of the provincial capitals of Ērānshahr (published posthumously, 1931)
