= Kesselbach =

Kesselbach may refer to:

- Kesselbach (Danube), a river of Baden-Württemberg, Germany, tributary of the Danube
- Kesselbach (Hünstetten)
- Kesselbach (Zwiefalter Aach), a river of Baden-Württemberg, Germany, tributary of the Zwiefalter Aach
