= Gunningen =

- Municipality
- Coat of arms

- Location of Gunningen within Tuttlingen district
- Interactive map of Gunningen
- Location within Germany Location within Baden-Württemberg
- Coordinates: 48°02′46″N 08°41′59″E
- Country: Germany
- State: Baden-Württemberg
- Admin. region: Freiburg
- District: Tuttlingen

Government
  - Mayor (2023–31): Stephen Jörg Haller

Area
  - Total: 5.44 km^{2} (2.10 sq mi)
- Elevation: 729 m (2,392 ft)

Population (2025-12-31)
  - Total: 766
  - Density: 141/km^{2} (365/sq mi)
- Time zone: UTC+01:00 (CET)
  - Summer (DST): UTC+02:00 (CEST)
- Postal codes: 78594
- Dialling codes: 07424
- Vehicle registration: TUT
- Website: www.gunningen.de

Gunningen is a municipality in the district of Tuttlingen in Baden-Württemberg in Germany.
