= Mike Hennessey =

British pianist and author

Mike Hennessey (25 February 1928 – 16 August 2017) was an English music journalist and jazz pianist.

Born in London as the third of four children, Hennessey, who came from a musical family, began learning piano at the age of six. After his military service, he began working as a journalist. He wrote for jazz magazines in Europe and North America and worked for 27 years as a correspondent and international editor for the US magazine Billboard, before retiring in 1994. He specialised in international copyright and intellectual property, and advocated strengthening of copyright protection for the music industry.

He co-founded Music Week and Music & Media and wrote biographies of jazz musicians Kenny Clarke and Johnny Griffin. As a pianist he was a member of Chas Burchell's band, with which he recorded two albums. He also joined the Paris Reunion band with Nat Adderley, toured with Adderley, Billy Mitchell, Arthur Blythe, Benny Golson, Keter Betts, Jimmy Cobb, and Jan Harrington, and worked as an accompanist for Buddy DeFranco, Nathan Davis, Johnny Griffin, Duško Gojković, and Ronnie Scott.

He moved to Germany and lived in Durchhausen from 1998 until his death in 2017 after a brief illness. He was married to the German concert agent Gaby Kleinschmidt.

== Publications ==
- Rogers, Eddie; Hennessey, Mike (1964). Tin Pan Alley. London: Robert Hale.
- Scott, Ronnie; Hennessey, Mike (1979). Some of My Best Friends Are Blues. London: W. H. Allen. ISBN 0491022395.
- Hennessey, Mike (1990). Klook: The Story of Kenny Clarke. London: Quartet Books. ISBN 0704325292.
- The Little Giant : the Story of Johnny Griffin. London: Northway Publications. 2008. ISBN 9780955090851.

== Discography ==
- Shades of Chas Burchell (In+Out, 1993)
- Unsung Hero: The Undiscovered Genius of Chas Burchell (In+Out, 1995)
