= Hermle =

Hermle may refer to:

- Hermle AG, a machine-tool manufacturer in Gosheim, Germany
- Hermle Clocks, a clockwork manufacturer in Gosheim, Germany and Amherst, Virginia, USA

Hermle is also a surname of German origin. People with this name include:

- Lynne Hermle, an attorney in Menlo Park, California
- Leo D. Hermle, A United States Marine officer in World Wars I and II
