= Durchhausen =

- Municipality
- Coat of arms

- Location of Durchhausen within Tuttlingen district
- Interactive map of Durchhausen
- Location within Germany Location within Baden-Württemberg
- Coordinates: 48°02′21″N 08°40′29″E
- Country: Germany
- State: Baden-Württemberg
- Admin. region: Freiburg
- District: Tuttlingen

Government
  - Mayor (2023–31): Simon Axt (CDU)

Area
  - Total: 8.99 km^{2} (3.47 sq mi)
- Elevation: 715 m (2,346 ft)

Population (2025-12-31)
  - Total: 1,060
  - Density: 118/km^{2} (305/sq mi)
- Time zone: UTC+01:00 (CET)
  - Summer (DST): UTC+02:00 (CEST)
- Postal codes: 78591
- Dialling codes: 07464
- Vehicle registration: TUT
- Website: www.durchhausen.de

Durchhausen is a municipality in the district of Tuttlingen in Baden-Württemberg in Germany. The design and development center of Allegion Security Technologies with its brand Interflex is in Durchhausen.
