= Ursentalbach =

River in Germany

Location
- Country: Germany
- State: Baden-Württemberg

Physical characteristics
- Mouth
  - location: Danube
  - coordinates: 48.0093°N 8.8590°E

Basin features
- Progression: Danube→ Black Sea

Ursentalbach is a small river in Baden-Württemberg, Germany. It flows into the Danube in Nendingen.

== See also ==
- List of rivers of Baden-Württemberg
