= Renquishausen =

- Municipality
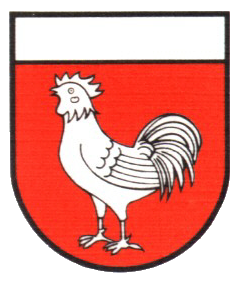
- Coat of arms

- Location of Renquishausen within Tuttlingen district
- Interactive map of Renquishausen
- Location within Germany Location within Baden-Württemberg
- Coordinates: 48°04′57″N 08°53′49″E
- Country: Germany
- State: Baden-Württemberg
- Admin. region: Freiburg
- District: Tuttlingen

Government
  - Mayor (2022–30): Jürgen Zinsmayer (CDU)

Area
  - Total: 7.70 km^{2} (2.97 sq mi)
- Elevation: 898 m (2,946 ft)

Population (2025-12-31)
  - Total: 809
  - Density: 105/km^{2} (272/sq mi)
- Time zone: UTC+01:00 (CET)
  - Summer (DST): UTC+02:00 (CEST)
- Postal codes: 78603
- Dialling codes: 07429
- Vehicle registration: TUT
- Website: www.renquishausen.de

Renquishausen is a municipality in the district of Tuttlingen in Baden-Württemberg in Germany.
