= Rietheim-Weilheim =

- Municipality
- Coat of arms

- Location of Rietheim-Weilheim within Tuttlingen district
- Interactive map of Rietheim-Weilheim
- Location within Germany Location within Baden-Württemberg
- Coordinates: 48°01′33″N 08°46′27″E
- Country: Germany
- State: Baden-Württemberg
- Admin. region: Freiburg
- District: Tuttlingen

Government
  - Mayor (2023–31): Felix Cramer von Clausbruch (FDP)

Area
  - Total: 11.98 km^{2} (4.63 sq mi)
- Elevation: 682 m (2,238 ft)

Population (2025-12-31)
  - Total: 2,983
  - Density: 249.0/km^{2} (644.9/sq mi)
- Time zone: UTC+01:00 (CET)
  - Summer (DST): UTC+02:00 (CEST)
- Postal codes: 78604
- Dialling codes: 07424
- Vehicle registration: TUT
- Website: www.rietheim-weilheim.de

Rietheim-Weilheim is a municipality in the district of Tuttlingen in Baden-Württemberg in Germany.

== History ==
On January 1, 1975, the town was created by joining the villages of Rietheim and Weilheim. This was part of the Municipal reform of Baden-Württemberg that took place in the late 1960s and 1970s.

Rietheim (then Reothaim) and Weilheim (then Amalpertiwilare) were first mentioned in a document written in Dürbheim on January 15, 786. Over the centuries, the spelling of Rietheim changed several times, but always referred to the grass-like Reed plant.

== Demographics ==
The town consists of the historical villages of Rietheim and Weilheim. As of 31 December 2023, Rietheim has a population of 1.793 and an area of 688 hectare, of which 210 are forest and 478 are agricultural fields and the populated area. Weilheim has a much smaller population of 1.138 and an area of 510 hectare.

== Politics ==
Jochen Arno was Rietheim-Weilheim's mayor from 2007 to 2023. During that time, he was additionally mayor of Hausen ob Verena from 2016 to 2023.

The current mayor is Felix Cramer von Clausbruch (FDP). He was elected on 12 March 2023. 1.306 (57.56%) of the 2.269 eligible voters voted. The results were as follows:

| Candidate | Result | |
| Candidate | Votes | % |
|---|---|---|
| Felix Cramer von Clausbruch | 873 | 66.85% |
| Jochen Karl | 426 | 32.62% |
| Invalid votes | 7 | 0.54% |
