= Nendingen =

- Ortsteil of Tuttlingen
- Coat of arms
- Interactive map of Nendingen
- Location within Germany Location within Baden-Württemberg
- Coordinates: 48°00′22″N 8°51′37″E
- Country: Germany
- State: Baden-Württemberg
- Admin. region: Freiburg
- District: Tuttlingen
- Town: Tuttlingen

Area
  - Total: 18.68 km^{2} (7.21 sq mi)
- Elevation: 637 m (2,090 ft)

Population (2016-12-31)
  - Total: 2,839
  - Density: 152.0/km^{2} (393.6/sq mi)
- Time zone: UTC+01:00 (CET)
  - Summer (DST): UTC+02:00 (CEST)
- Postal codes: 78532
- Dialling codes: 07461
- Vehicle registration: TUT
- Website: www.nendingen.de

Nendingen is a German village with 2850 inhabitants in Baden-Württemberg. The Danube flows through Nendingen, which lies between the towns Tuttlingen and Mühlheim an der Donau. Nendingen was founded by Nando, an Alamanni, between 260 and 300 AD.

The majority of the Nendingers are Catholics and the church „St. Petrus und Jakobus“ (Saint Peter and James, son of Zebedee) is very old (Rococo) and nice. Nendingen belongs to the diocese Rottenburg-Stuttgart. Until 1873, parts of Mühlheim and Tuttlingen pertained to the Nendinger parish.

The most popular sports are wrestling and handball. The carnival is very well-celebrated in the village.

Nendingen is a part of Tuttlingen since 1973. It has an elementary school.

Its coat of arms is blue and yellow and shows a shield and three fleur-de-lis. After 1409, Nendingen was directed by the baron of Mühlheim. By Napoleon, in 1805 it came to the Kingdom of Württemberg.

Nendingen has a train station on the Tuttlingen–Inzigkofen railway.

Nendingen has an intact and rich nature: 55,44 percent are forest (mainly beech) and 36,36 percent are agriculture. The Swabian Alb begins in Nendingen. As Nendingen is in Swabia, the inhabitants speak Swabian German.

year	inhabitants
1 January 1834	955
1848	1118
1853	1039
1855	966
1875	946
1 January 1880	991
1885	1.000
1 January 1910	1.200

year	inhabitants
1933	1.385
1939	1.478
1950	1.583
1964	2.000
1 January 1970	2.146
1 January 1992	2.612
1 January 2002	2.803
20s January 2007	2.850
