= Mahlstetten =

- Municipality
- Coat of arms

- Location of Mahlstetten within Tuttlingen district
- Interactive map of Mahlstetten
- Location within Germany Location within Baden-Württemberg
- Coordinates: 48°04′29″N 08°50′16″E
- Country: Germany
- State: Baden-Württemberg
- Admin. region: Freiburg
- District: Tuttlingen

Government
  - Mayor (2021–29): Benedikt Buggle

Area
  - Total: 12.21 km^{2} (4.71 sq mi)
- Elevation: 879 m (2,884 ft)

Population (2025-12-31)
  - Total: 818
  - Density: 67.0/km^{2} (174/sq mi)
- Time zone: UTC+01:00 (CET)
  - Summer (DST): UTC+02:00 (CEST)
- Postal codes: 78601
- Dialling codes: 07429
- Vehicle registration: TUT
- Website: www.mahlstetten.de

Mahlstetten is a municipality in the district of Tuttlingen in Baden-Württemberg in Germany.

== Demographics ==
Population development:

Year	Inhabitants
1990	705
2001	744
2011	741
2021	805
