= Heuberg Railway =

Railway line in Germany

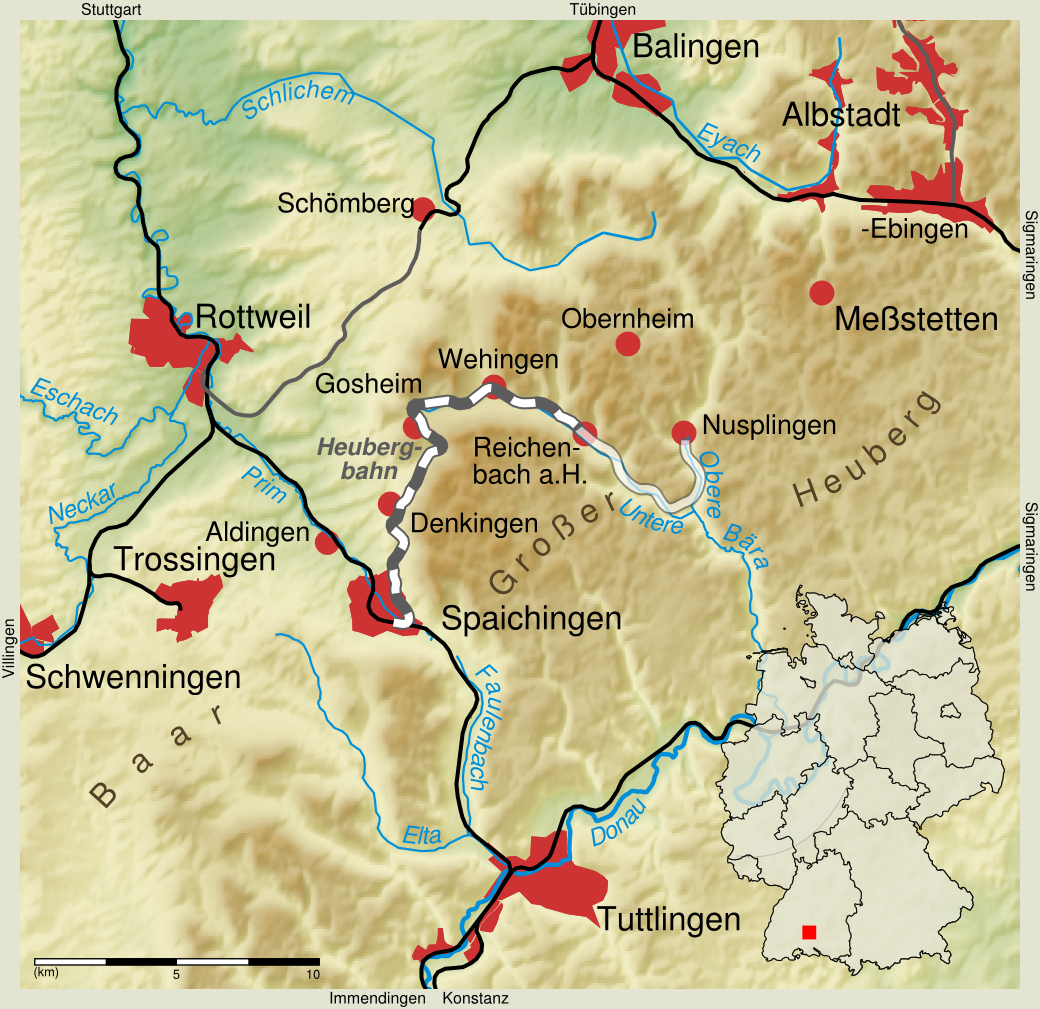

Overview
- Native name: Heubergbahn
- Line number: 4601
- Locale: Baden-Württemberg, Germany
- Termini: Spaichingen; Reichenbach am Heuberg

Service
- Route number: 274d / 318g / 308c

History
- Opened: 1928
- Closed: 1966

Technical
- Line length: 17.9 km (11.1 mi)
- Track gauge: 1,435 mm (4 ft 8 1/2 in) standard gauge
- Old gauge: narrow gauge

The Heuberg Railway (Heubergbahn) was a 17.9 kilometres (11.1 mi) standard gauge railway line in the German federal state of Baden-Württemberg. The line operated between 1928 and 1966, and ran from Spaichingen, past five railway stations and a stop to Reichenbach am Heuberg. The line was originally planned as a narrow-gauge line through Reichenbach and Egesheim to Nusplingen. It was significant in the development and industrialization of the communities of the Heuberg plateau.

== Building ==
The first sod was turned on 30 January 1913. The highest point of the railway would be at Gosheim station at 841 metres above sea level. The work should be finished in 1915. Because of World War I work was stopped in November 1916. The work was restarted in 1919. The work was stopped again in April 1920. In 1926 the work was restarted. At this time, 80% of the work was finished. The railway was built only as far as Reichenbach and not to Nusplingen. On 25 May 1928, the railway was opened to Reichenbach (Heuberg).

== Operations ==
Railway operations had stopped by the end of World War II. Railway operations began again on 7 January 1946. From 23 May 1954, only one pair train of trains ran each day from Monday to Friday, but there were additional buses. In March 1964, Deutsche Bundesbahn planned to close the railway. The railway was closed on 23 September 1966.

== Planning ==
In 1908 the government master-builder (Regierungsbaumeister) Wallersteiner made plans for a 6000 Goldmark extension to Nusplingen-Heuberg Training Area-Meßstetten–Ebingen . The cost reached 8000 Goldmark.
