= Nusplingen =

German municipality

- Municipality
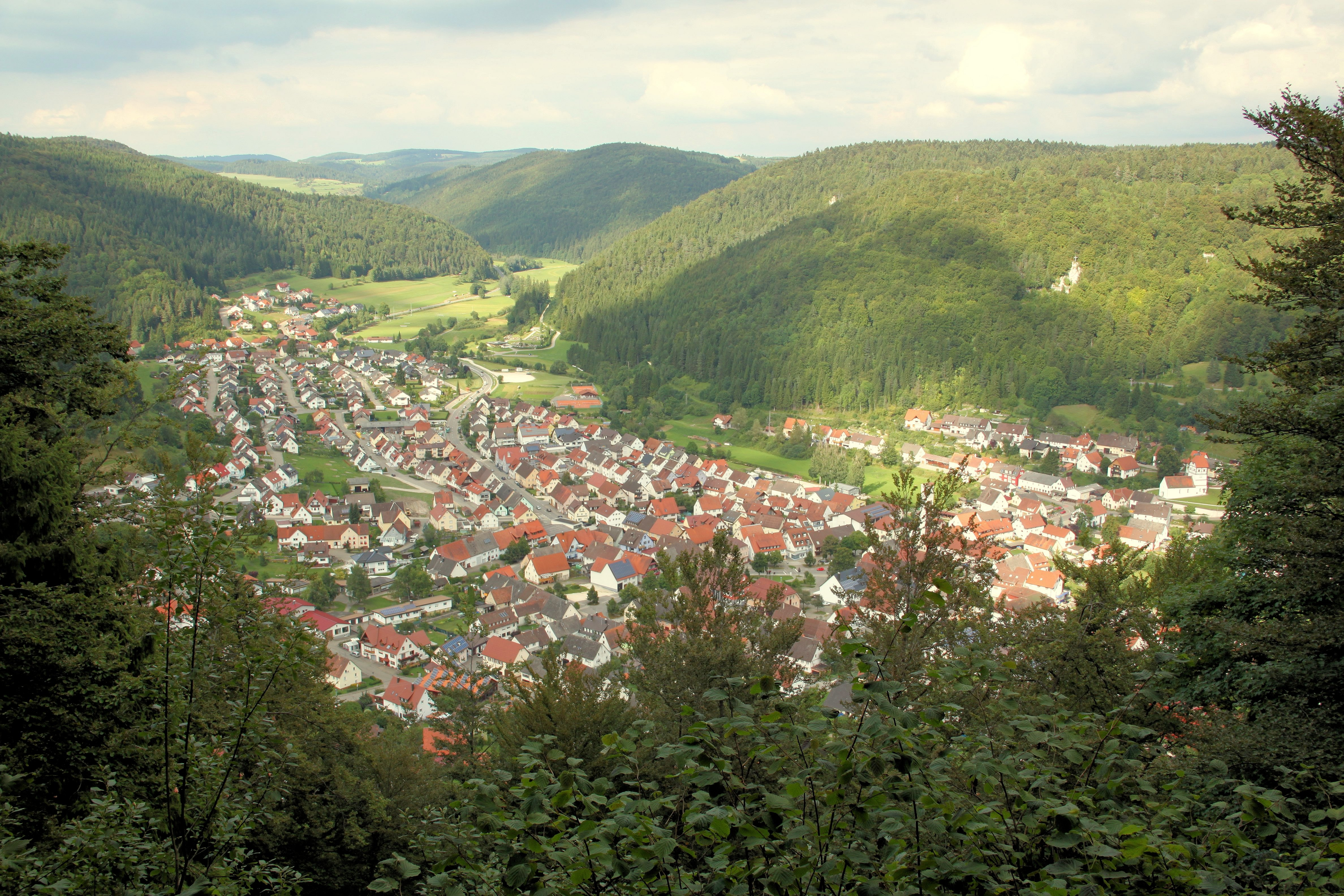
- View of Nusplingen

- Coat of arms

- Location of Nusplingen within Zollernalbkreis district
- Interactive map of Nusplingen
- Location within Germany Location within Baden-Württemberg
- Coordinates: 48°07′58″N 08°53′24″E
- Country: Germany
- State: Baden-Württemberg
- Admin. region: Tübingen
- District: Zollernalbkreis

Government
  - Mayor (2016–24): Jörg Alisch

Area
  - Total: 20.75 km^{2} (8.01 sq mi)
- Elevation: 723 m (2,372 ft)

Population (2025-12-31)
  - Total: 1,912
  - Density: 92.14/km^{2} (238.7/sq mi)
- Time zone: UTC+01:00 (CET)
  - Summer (DST): UTC+02:00 (CEST)
- Postal codes: 72362
- Dialling codes: 07429
- Vehicle registration: BL
- Website: www.nusplingen-online.de

Nusplingen is a municipality of the Zollernalb district of Baden-Württemberg, Germany.

== History ==
In 1803, Nusplingen became a possession of the Principality of Hohenzollern-Sigmaringen, who traded the town in 1813 to the Kingdom of Württemberg for Beuron Abbey. Nusplingen was assigned to Oberamt Spaichingen and remained in that district until its dissolution in 1938. Following that dissolution, Nusplingen was reassigned to the Landkreis Balingen. This district was itself dissolved in 1973, when Baden-Württemberg reorganized its administrative structure, and Nusplingen was assigned to the newly created Zollernalb district. After World War II, the town grew and industrialized beginning in the 1950s with development at its northern extremity.

== Geography ==
The municipality (Gemeinde) of Nusplingen is located at the southern edge of the Zollernalb district of Baden-Württemberg, a state of the Federal Republic of Germany. It lies along the border with Tuttlingen district to the south and Sigmaringen to the east. Nusplingen is physically located in the middle of the Kuppenalb, part of the larger regions of the High Swabian Jura and the Upper Danube Nature Park. Its primary watercourse is the Bära river, which flows through the municipality from north to south and whose valley dominates its landscape. Elevation above sea level in the municipal area ranges from a low of 690 meters (2,260 ft) Normalnull (NN) along the Bära to a high of 954 meters (3,130 ft) NN at the top of the Staufenberg.

The hill Westenberg is the location where Nusplingen Limestone is being excavated for scientific research, since 1993. Important fossils from the Late Jurassic were discovered here.

Part of the Federally-protected Galgenwiesen and Westerberg nature reserves are located in the municipality.

== Demographics ==
Population development:

Year	Inhabitants
1990	1,922
2001	1,878
2011	1,829
2021	1,865

== Coat of arms ==
Nusplingen's coat of arms shows an eagle's leg, with claws bared, in yellow upon a field of red. This pattern was taken from that of an extinct local noble family and was approved for official use by the provisional post-WWII Württemberg-Hohenzollern government on 16 May 1950. Previous municipal emblems include a town seal from 1515 and a pattern of blue-black-yellow wavy bars devised in 1930. A municipal flag corresponding to the coat of arms was issued by the Baden-Württemberg State Ministry of the Interior on 30 August 1967.

== Transportation ==
Local public transportation is provided by the Verkehrsverbund Neckar-Alb-Donau. Nusplingen was selected to be the endpoint for the Heuberg Railway, but in 1928 Reichenbach was chosen over Nusplingen.
