= Bernhard Häring =

German Catholic theologian (1912–1998)

The Reverend Dr. Bernhard Häring CSsR
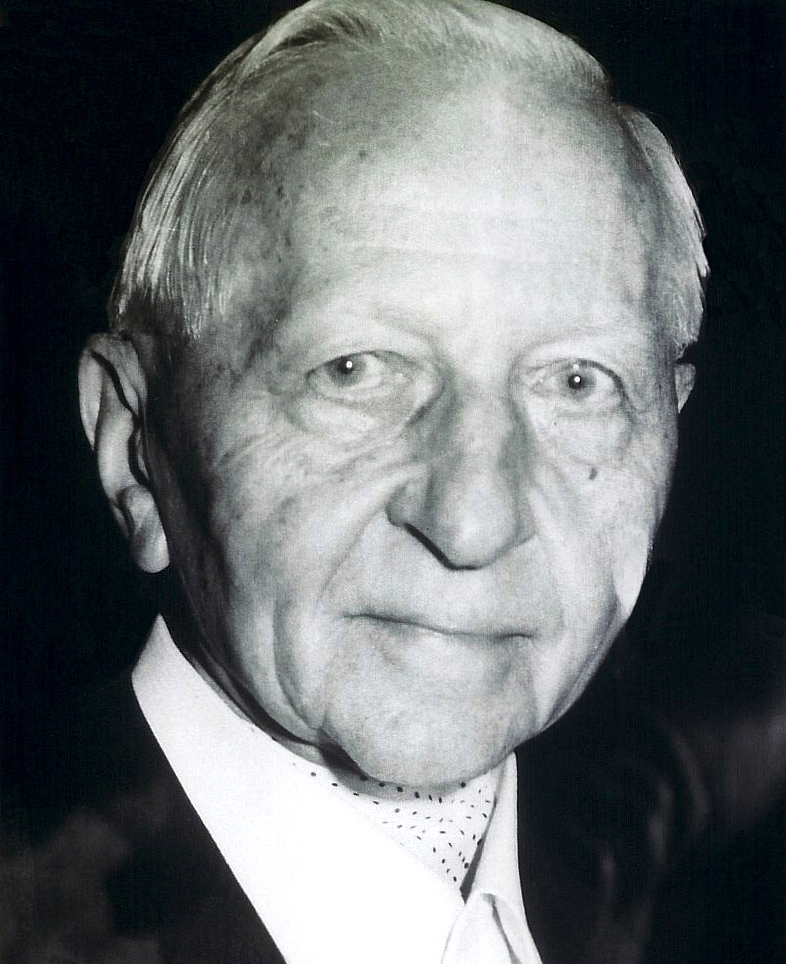

Personal life
- Born: 10 November 1912 Böttingen, German Empire
- Died: 3 July 1998 (aged 85) Haag in Oberbayern, Germany
- Notable work: The Law of Christ
- Education: University of Tübingen
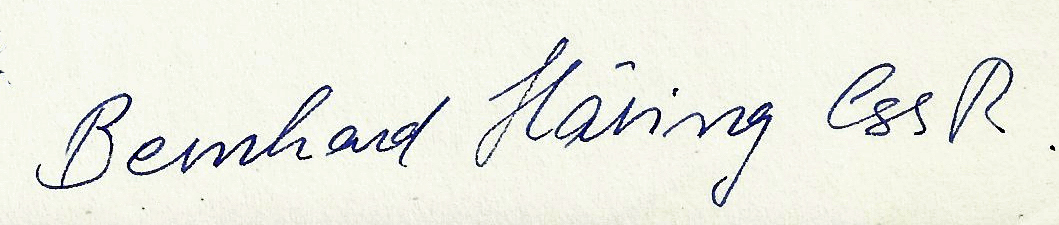
- Signature

Religious life
- Religion: Catholic Church
- Order: Redemptorists

Bernard Häring CSsR (10 November 1912 – 3 July 1998) was a German moral theologian and a Redemptorist priest in the Catholic Church. The National Catholic Reporter, upon his death, called him "the foremost Catholic moral theologian of the 20th century and a leading advocate for church reform before, during and after the Second Vatican Council."

== Life ==
Häring was born at Böttingen in Germany to a prosperous farmer. In 1934, he entered the Congregation of the Most Holy Redeemer, and was ordained a priest in 1939. He completed doctoral studies in moral theology, in obedience to his superiors, at the University of Tübingen.

During World War II, he was conscripted by the German army and served as a medic. Although forbidden from performing priestly functions in public by the Nazi authorities, he brought the sacraments to Catholic soldiers.

In 1954, he came to international fame as a moral theologian with his three-volume work, The Law of Christ. The work received ecclesiastical approval but was written in a style different from the manual tradition. It was translated into more than twelve languages. Fr Richard A. McCormick of Notre Dame called this work, ''groundbreaking, revolutionary.'' He based moral theology on the moral teachings of Jesus in the Bible rather than on, "a legalistic system of precepts and sanctions."

Between 1949 and 1987, he taught moral theology at Alphonsian Academy in Rome. He served as a peritus (expert) at the Second Vatican Council from 1962 to 1965, and was the chief architect on the mixed commission which prepared the pastoral constitution, Gaudium et Spes. He was a prominent dissenter from Humanae Vitae, a minority report on birth control drafted by four people out of 68 on a panel, and was investigated by Pope Paul VI.

Häring taught at various universities, including the University of San Francisco, Fordham, Brown, and the Kennedy Institute for Bioethics at Georgetown. His approach was ecumenical, and he taught at Yale, Brown, and Harvard, universities with Protestant origins. A prolific writer, Häring produced about 80 books and 1,000 articles. He established himself as a leader in moving Catholic moral theology to a more personalist and scripture-based approach.

He died of a stroke at the age of 85 at Haag in Oberbayern, Germany.

== Dialogical approach to Catholic moral theology ==
Häring presents a dialogical approach to Catholic moral theology in his trilogies The Law of Christ and Free and Faithful in Christ. In this approach, morality follows the pattern of faith necessitating a dialogue. This approach to morality rests on the person's conscience that acknowledges God as basis of value; he writes:

"God speaks in many ways to awaken, deepen and strengthen faith, hope, love and the spirit of adoration. We are believers to the extent that, in all of reality and in all events that touch us, we perceive a gift and a call from God."

== Selected works ==
- — (1967) [1961]. The Law of Christ. Moral Theology for Priests and Laity. Ireland: Mercier Press. [German 1954]. 3 Vols.
- — (1977). Blessed Are the Pure in Heart: The Beatitudes. ISBN 9780816421251.
- — (1968). The Christian Existentialist. New York, New York University Press.
- —. Church on the Move.
- —. Dare to Be Christian: Developing a Social Conscience.
- —. Discovering God's Mercy: Confession Helps for Today's Catholic.
- —. Embattled Witness: Memories of a Time of War.
- —. The Ethics of Manipulation.
- — (1979). The Eucharist and Our Everyday Life. ISBN 9780816422104.
- — (1966). Road to Renewal. Staten Island, N.Y., Alba House.
- — (1969). Shalom, Peace. Garden City, N.Y., Image Books.
- — (1978). Free and Faithful in Christ. ( 3 Vols.)
