= Königsheim =

- Municipality
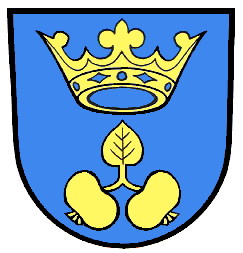
- Coat of arms

- Location of Königsheim within Tuttlingen district
- Interactive map of Königsheim
- Location within Germany Location within Baden-Württemberg
- Coordinates: 48°06′04″N 08°51′51″E
- Country: Germany
- State: Baden-Württemberg
- Admin. region: Freiburg
- District: Tuttlingen

Government
  - Mayor (2019–27): Konstantin Braun

Area
  - Total: 4.36 km^{2} (1.68 sq mi)
- Elevation: 897 m (2,943 ft)

Population (2025-12-31)
  - Total: 634
  - Density: 145/km^{2} (377/sq mi)
- Time zone: UTC+01:00 (CET)
  - Summer (DST): UTC+02:00 (CEST)
- Postal codes: 78598
- Dialling codes: 07429
- Vehicle registration: TUT
- Website: www.gemeinde-koenigsheim.de

Königsheim is a municipality in the district of Tuttlingen in Baden-Württemberg in Germany.

== Demographics ==
Population development:

Year	Inhabitants
1990	509
2001	549
2011	568
2021	601
