= Carl von Ulm zu Erbach =

Austrian nobleman and politician (1725–1781)

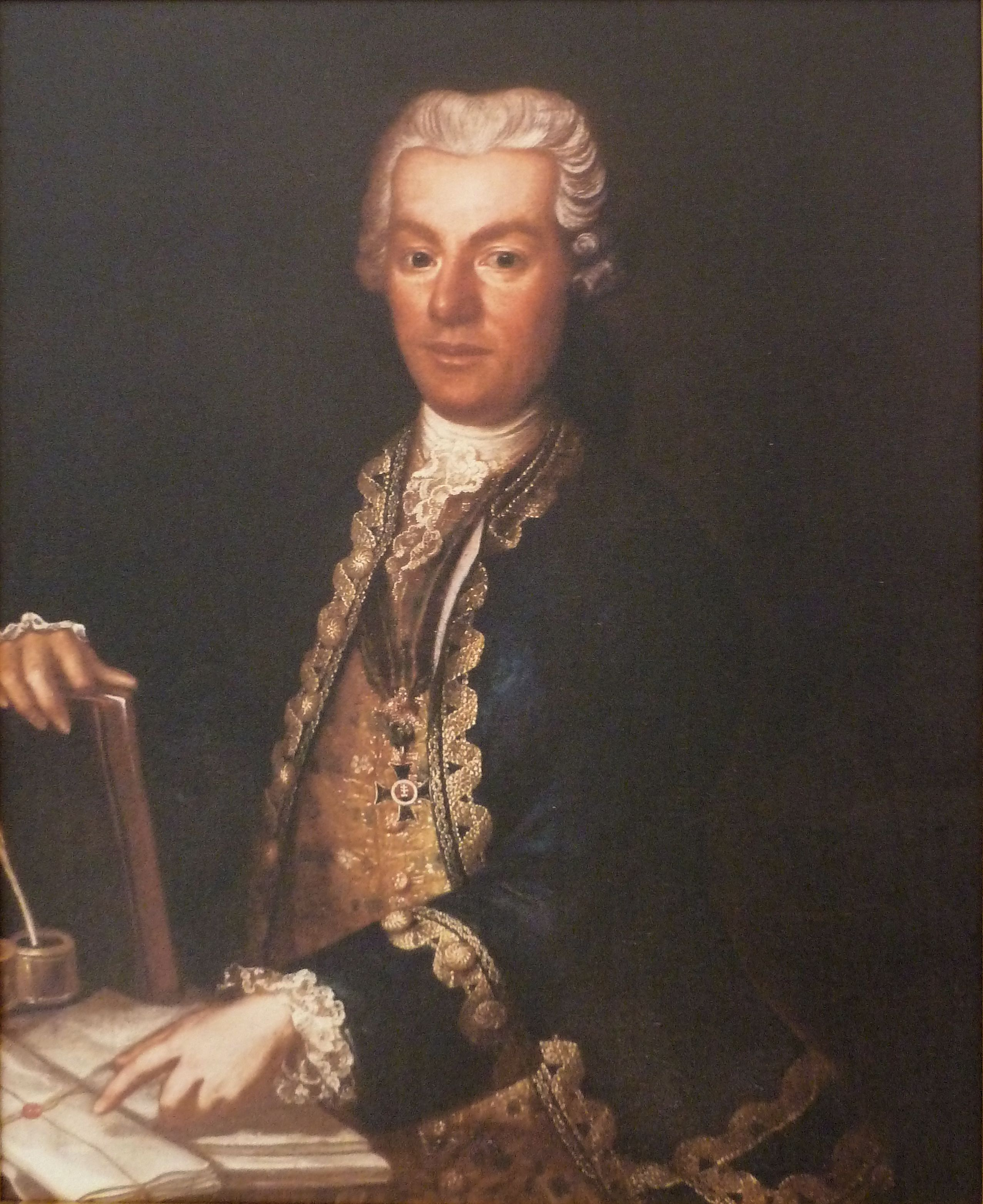
Carl von Ulm zu Erbach as the second governor of Further Austria

Carl von Ulm zu Erbach (30 November 1725 – 21 March 1781) was an Austrian nobleman and politician who served as President of the Government of Further Austria in Freiburg beginning in 1769.

== Early life ==
The von Ulm family played a key role in the Habsburg administration, serving from 1717 to 1743 as governors (Landvögte) of the Margraviate of Burgau based in Günzburg. Carl's parents were Franz Eucherius Freiherr von Ulm zu Erbach and Maria Mauritia von Muggenthal. Initially destined for an ecclesiastical career, he was sent to study in Dillingen. Following the deaths of his mother in 1730 and father in 1743, the Augsburg canon and provost Gerhard Wilhelm Freiherr von Dollberg became his guardian.

Carl abandoned his studies to undertake the customary Grand Tour. In 1748 he successfully applied for a canonry in Eichstätt, though he never took up the position. In 1749, he married Countess Maria Theresia von Starhemberg in Vienna in the presence of the imperial couple. Later that year, on 23 September, Empress Maria Theresa appointed him imperial chamberlain.

In 1753, von Ulm was appointed unpaid Supernumerari-Repräsentationsrat for the newly established Further Austrian government in Konstanz, allowing him to reside on his estate in Erbach. When the government relocated to Freiburg in 1759, he requested temporary leave; after repeated petitions, he was appointed paid Vogt of Burgau in 1763.

In 1764, von Ulm issued a decree regulating begging in the domains of Werenwag and Callenberg, and supported the expansion of textile production.

== Presidency of Further Austria ==
Upon taking office on 27 January 1769, von Ulm attempted to move the administration from Freiburg to Günzburg, closer to his estate, arguing that of the 100,000–200,000 florins spent annually by officials in Freiburg, two-thirds flowed into Alsace and France. He arrived in Freiburg on 18 August 1769.

In May 1770, von Ulm orchestrated the ceremonial reception of Marie-Antoinette during her journey to Paris. The city and government spent 200,000 thalers on festivities, prompting Empress Maria Theresa to publicly rebuke von Ulm for extravagance. He was widely known for his poor financial management and came close to bankruptcy on several occasions. To cover these costs, he took out loans, including one from the Abbey of St. Märgen. In 1772, the Empress authorized him to raise 40,000 gulden against his estates in Swabian Austria. In 1774, he acknowledged borrowing 14,000 gulden from Abbot Bonaventura Bucher of Muri Abbey at four percent annual interest.

That same year, he was accused of mismanagement by councilors Hermann von Greiffenegg and Thaddäus Schmid von Brandenstein. Defending himself successfully in Vienna, he was awarded the Commander’s Cross of the Order of St. Stephen on 15 June 1772. He witnessed firsthand the Empress’s interest in education reform and retained the chairmanship of the imperial school commission. A teacher training college (Normalschule) was opened in Freiburg in 1773. That year also saw the suppression of the Jesuit order by Pope Clement XIV, leading to the closure of the Jesuit college in Freiburg and the transfer of its buildings to the university. The Jesuit palace in Merzhausen was sold for 66,000 florins.

During a 1777 visit to the region, Emperor Joseph II harshly criticized the administration, describing Freiburg as unimpressive and overly bureaucratic. He complained about von Ulm’s inability to control expenses and personnel and considered the university unworthy of its costs. In response, von Ulm claimed that in order to maintain order and dignity, he had personally overseen roughly 25,000 dispatches annually. Nonetheless, his administration failed to address significant structural inefficiencies.

== Death ==
Von Ulm's health declined in 1780, and he died the following year in Freiburg. His epitaph in the church of Erbach reads: “He devoted himself wholly to the service of the state and his sovereign. Consumed by zeal for both, he died in Freiburg.”

== Works cited ==
- von Arneth, Alfred (1867), Maria Theresia und Joseph II: Ihre Correspondenz sammt Briefen Joseph's an seinen Bruder Leopold, Vienna: Carl Gerold's Sohn
- von Kageneck, Alfred (1981), Das Ende der vorderösterreichischen Herrschaft im Breisgau, Freiburg: Rombach
- Quarthal, Franz (2002), "Die vier vorderösterreichischen Regierungspräsidenten in der zweiten Hälfte des 18. Jahrhunderts", Habsburg und der Oberrhein, Waldkircher Verlagsgesellschaft, ISBN 3-87885-344-0
- Spicker-Beck, Monika (2019), Hirbodian, Sigrid; Schmauder, Andreas; Waßner, Manfred (eds.), Eine Stadt im Wandel der Zeit, Gemeinde im Wandel, vol. 19, ISBN 978-3-00-064226-5
