= Hermle AG =

Maschinenfabrik Berthold Hermle AG
- Company type: Public
- Industry: Machine tools
- Founded: 1938
- Founder: Berthold Hermle
- Headquarters: Gosheim, Germany
- Website: www.hermle.de

Maschinenfabrik Berthold Hermle AG, or simply Hermle, is a publicly traded German company with headquarters in Gosheim, Baden-Württemberg, Germany. It is one of the leading manufacturers of milling machines. There are over 20,000 Hermle-manufactured machines in use worldwide. The chief users are suppliers of medical technology, the optical industry, aviation, and the automotive industry and racing.

Most development and manufacturing is located in Gosheim. The universal milling machines and machining centers from Hermle are used to produce tools, molds, and production parts.

== History ==
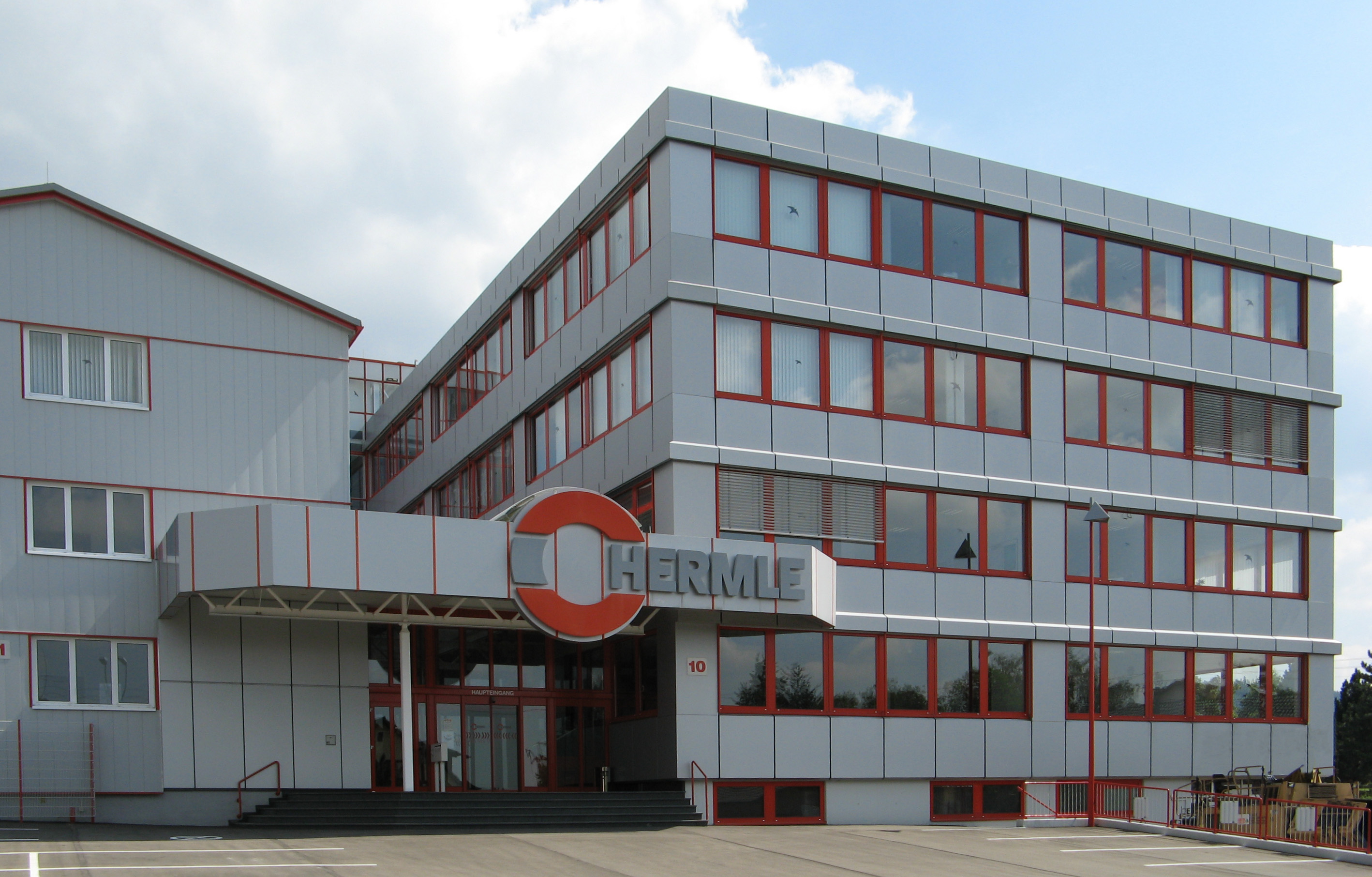
Main building of Hermle AG in Gosheim

The company was founded in 1938 by Berthold Hermle as a screw factory and turned-parts shop in Gosheim. Milling-machine production began in 1957. The first universal tool milling machine was presented in 1972, followed by CNC-controlled machines in 1978. In 1990 the business was converted into a stock corporation and went public. In 2019-2020 Hermle expanded its manufacturing footprint by investing about €15 million in a new sheet-metal production facility at Zimmern ob Rottweil, and in 2020 Hermle USA completed about $3 million extension of its North American headquarters in Franklin, Wisconsin.

== Products and technology ==
Hermle's core products machining centres with automation options used in sectors such as medical technology, optics, aerospace and automotive.

The company also developed the Metal Powder Application process, a hybrid manufacturing approach that applies metal via a cold-spray kinetic deposition and then machines the part in the same system.
