= Frittlingen =

- Municipality
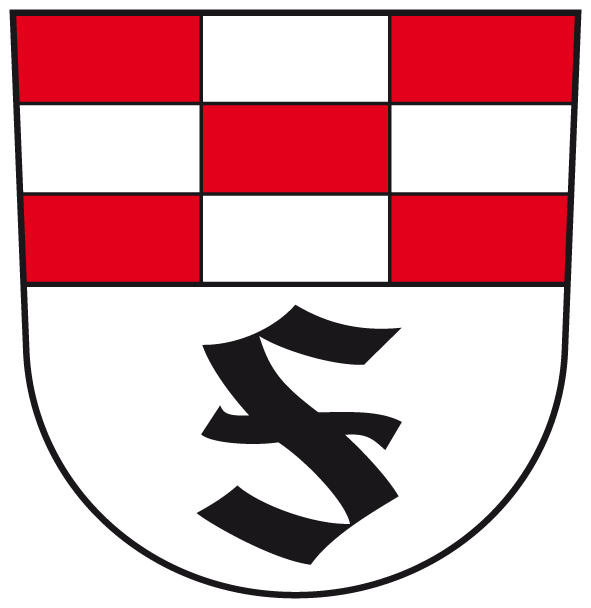
- Coat of arms

- Location of Frittlingen within Tuttlingen district
- Interactive map of Frittlingen
- Location within Germany Location within Baden-Württemberg
- Coordinates: 48°07′40″N 08°42′20″E
- Country: Germany
- State: Baden-Württemberg
- Admin. region: Freiburg
- District: Tuttlingen

Government
  - Mayor (2017–25): Dominic Butz (Ind.)

Area
  - Total: 8.79 km^{2} (3.39 sq mi)
- Elevation: 659 m (2,162 ft)

Population (2025-12-31)
  - Total: 2,127
  - Density: 242/km^{2} (627/sq mi)
- Time zone: UTC+01:00 (CET)
  - Summer (DST): UTC+02:00 (CEST)
- Postal codes: 78665
- Dialling codes: 07426
- Vehicle registration: TUT
- Website: www.frittlingen.de

Frittlingen is a municipality in the district of Tuttlingen in Baden-Württemberg in Germany.
