= Tuttlingen (district) =

Coordinates: 48°N 8.8°E

- District
- Flag Coat of arms
- Country: Germany
- State: Baden-Württemberg
- Adm. region: Freiburg
- Capital: Tuttlingen

Government
  - District admin.: Stefan Bär (FW)

Area
  - Total: 734.4 km^{2} (283.6 sq mi)

Population (31 December 2025)
  - Total: 145,002
  - Density: 197.4/km^{2} (511.4/sq mi)
- Time zone: UTC+01:00 (CET)
  - Summer (DST): UTC+02:00 (CEST)
- Vehicle registration: TUT
- Website: http://www.landkreis-Tuttlingen.de

Tuttlingen is a Landkreis (district) in the south of Baden-Württemberg, Germany. Neighboring districts are (from north clockwise) Rottweil, Zollernalbkreis, Sigmaringen, Constance and Schwarzwald-Baar.

== History ==
The district dates back to the Oberamt Tuttlingen, which was created in 1806. After several minor changes it was merged with the Oberamt Spaichingen and converted into the district in 1938. In 1973, it was enlarged by some municipalities from the dissolved districts Donaueschingen and Stockach.

== Mining ==
From an old 3.5 km mine in a Doggererzflöz in Weilheim is wood in the Tuttlinger Fruchtkasten . Steel was produced in Tuttlingen by the Schwäbische Hüttenwerke in Ludwigshal. The furnace in Harras was closed in 1832. By building railways new calculations make the ironore of the area unprofitable. After the Franco-Prussian War mining was stopped.

== Geography ==
The landscape of the district are the hills of the Swabian Alb, with the Danube as the main river.

== Coat of arms ==
The coat of arms show a deer antler in the top part, the symbol of the state of Württemberg. The area of the district became part of Württemberg in the 14th century. The half wheel in the bottom is the symbol of the Lords of Hohenberg, representing an Austrian possession in the district.

== Towns and municipalities ==
Clickable map of towns and municipalities in the district

Towns	Municipalities
1. Fridingen (Donau); 2. Geisingen; 3. Mühlheim an der Donau; 4. Spaichingen; 5. Trossingen (with Schura); 6. Tuttlingen (with Nendingen, Möhringen und Eßlingen)	1. Aldingen; 2. Balgheim; 3. Bärenthal; 4. Böttingen; 5. Bubsheim; 6. Buchheim; 7. Deilingen; 8. Denkingen; 9. Dürbheim; 10. Durchhausen; 11. Egesheim; 12. Emmingen-Liptingen; 13. Frittlingen; 14. Gosheim; 15. Gunningen	16. Hausen ob Verena; 17. Immendingen; 18. Irndorf; 19. Kolbingen; 20. Königsheim; 21. Mahlstetten; 22. Neuhausen ob Eck; 23. Reichenbach am Heuberg; 24. Renquishausen; 25. Rietheim-Weilheim; 26. Seitingen-Oberflacht; 27. Talheim; 28. Wehingen; 29. Wurmlingen (Tuttlingen)
Verwaltungsgemeinschaften	1. Aldingen; 2. Balgheim; 3. Bärenthal; 4. Böttingen; 5. Bubsheim; 6. Buchheim; 7. Deilingen; 8. Denkingen; 9. Dürbheim; 10. Durchhausen; 11. Egesheim; 12. Emmingen-Liptingen; 13. Frittlingen; 14. Gosheim; 15. Gunningen	16. Hausen ob Verena; 17. Immendingen; 18. Irndorf; 19. Kolbingen; 20. Königsheim; 21. Mahlstetten; 22. Neuhausen ob Eck; 23. Reichenbach am Heuberg; 24. Renquishausen; 25. Rietheim-Weilheim; 26. Seitingen-Oberflacht; 27. Talheim; 28. Wehingen; 29. Wurmlingen (Tuttlingen)
1. Donau-Heuberg; 2. Heuberg; 3. Immendingen-Geisingen; 4. Spaichingen; 5. Trossingen; 6. Tuttlingen	1. Aldingen; 2. Balgheim; 3. Bärenthal; 4. Böttingen; 5. Bubsheim; 6. Buchheim; 7. Deilingen; 8. Denkingen; 9. Dürbheim; 10. Durchhausen; 11. Egesheim; 12. Emmingen-Liptingen; 13. Frittlingen; 14. Gosheim; 15. Gunningen	16. Hausen ob Verena; 17. Immendingen; 18. Irndorf; 19. Kolbingen; 20. Königsheim; 21. Mahlstetten; 22. Neuhausen ob Eck; 23. Reichenbach am Heuberg; 24. Renquishausen; 25. Rietheim-Weilheim; 26. Seitingen-Oberflacht; 27. Talheim; 28. Wehingen; 29. Wurmlingen (Tuttlingen)
