= Mühlheim an der Donau =

- Town
- Coat of arms

- Location of Mühlheim an der Donau within Tuttlingen district
- Interactive map of Mühlheim an der Donau
- Location within Germany Location within Baden-Württemberg
- Coordinates: 48°01′50″N 08°53′09″E
- Country: Germany
- State: Baden-Württemberg
- Admin. region: Freiburg
- District: Tuttlingen

Government
  - Mayor (2021–29): Jörg Kaltenbach

Area
  - Total: 21.74 km^{2} (8.39 sq mi)
- Elevation: 664 m (2,178 ft)

Population (2025-12-31)
  - Total: 3,622
  - Density: 166.6/km^{2} (431.5/sq mi)
- Time zone: UTC+01:00 (CET)
  - Summer (DST): UTC+02:00 (CEST)
- Postal codes: 78570
- Dialling codes: 07463
- Vehicle registration: TUT
- Website: www.muehlheim-donau.de

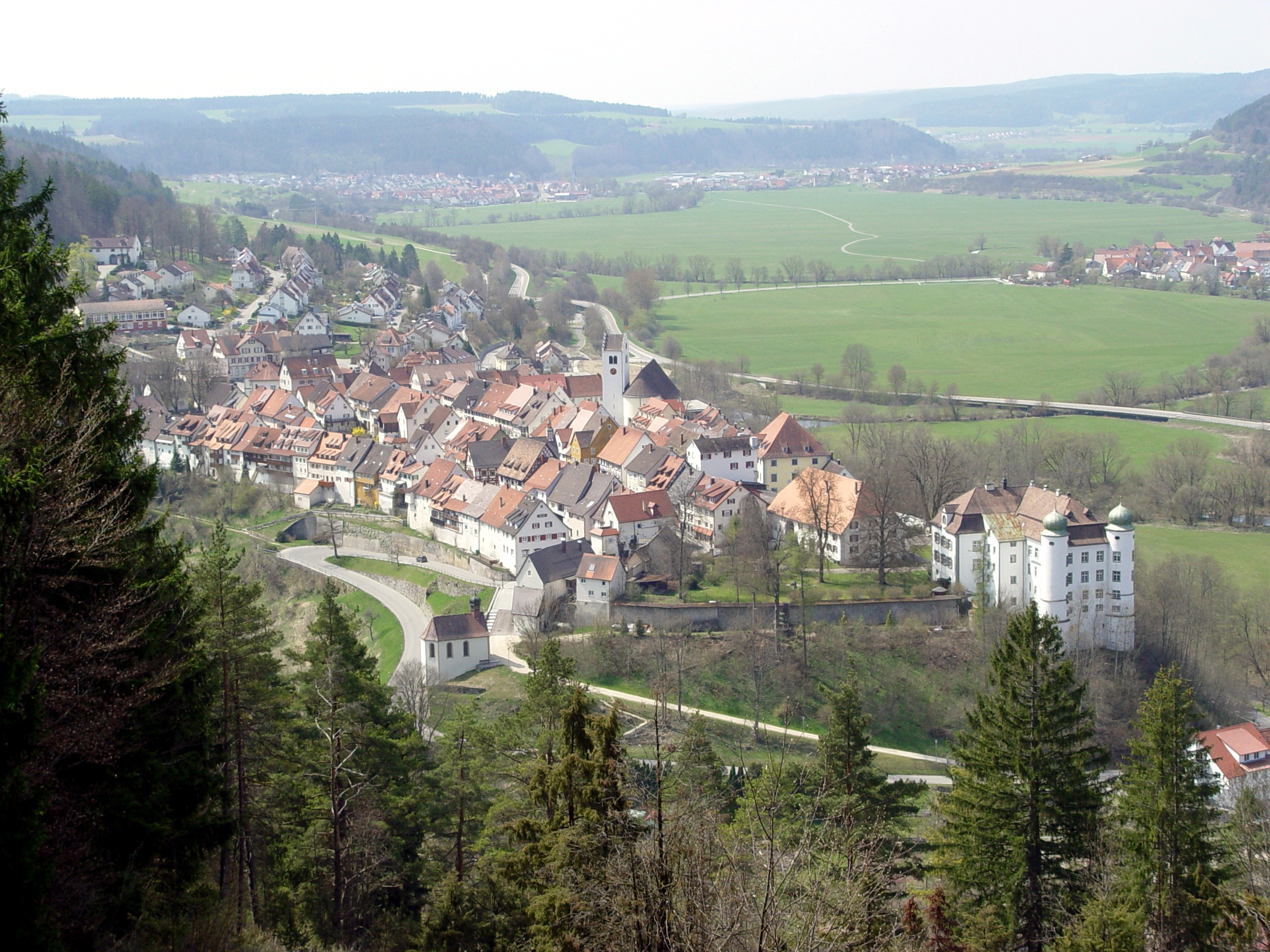
Mühlheim

Mühlheim an der Donau (German pronunciation: [ˈmyːlhaɪm ʔan deːɐ̯ ˈdoːnaʊ], lit. 'Mühlheim on the Danube') is a town in the district Tuttlingen in Baden-Württemberg, Germany. It is situated on the Danube, 7 km northeast of Tuttlingen.

== History ==
While today the largest part of the city is on the right bank of the Danube, the city Mühlheim was founded on the left bank, where the old part of town is still to be found. There a spring provides enough water year-round to drive millwheels. There is evidence that watermills were built here as early as the Roman imperium. The place takes its name from this, Mühlheim being equivalent to the English cognates: Mill-Home. An old trade route from the Bodensee crossed the river here, and from the ford at Mühlheim continued into the Albvorland after Rottweil.
The first documentary mention of the city dates from the year 843.

== Attractions ==
The timber framed Gothic city hall has been a listed historical monument since 1928. The earliest known written record dates to 1512, but a Romanesque capital is believed to date from around 1200.

The castle was first built around 1200 and was reconstructed in its present form in the mid 18th century.

The Galluschurch is Mühlheim's cemetery church. Parts of the building are Romanesque and date from the 10th and 11th centuries. The interior has frescos from the 14th and 15th centuries.

The yellow rock serves as a viewpoint overlooking the Danube valley.
