= Denkingen =

- Municipality
- Coat of arms

- Location of Denkingen within Tuttlingen district
- Interactive map of Denkingen
- Location within Germany Location within Baden-Württemberg
- Coordinates: 48°06′32″N 08°44′19″E
- Country: Germany
- State: Baden-Württemberg
- Admin. region: Freiburg
- District: Tuttlingen

Government
  - Mayor (2023–31): Fabian Biselli

Area
  - Total: 15.02 km^{2} (5.80 sq mi)
- Elevation: 687 m (2,254 ft)

Population (2025-12-31)
  - Total: 2,962
  - Density: 197.2/km^{2} (510.8/sq mi)
- Time zone: UTC+01:00 (CET)
  - Summer (DST): UTC+02:00 (CEST)
- Postal codes: 78588
- Dialling codes: 07424
- Vehicle registration: TUT
- Website: www.denkingen.de

Denkingen is a municipality in the district of Tuttlingen in Baden-Württemberg in Germany.
