= Dürbheim =

- Municipality
- Coat of arms

- Location of Dürbheim within Tuttlingen district
- Interactive map of Dürbheim
- Location within Germany Location within Baden-Württemberg
- Coordinates: 48°03′22″N 08°47′35″E
- Country: Germany
- State: Baden-Württemberg
- Admin. region: Freiburg
- District: Tuttlingen

Government
  - Mayor (2022–30): Heike Burgbacher

Area
  - Total: 14.85 km^{2} (5.73 sq mi)
- Elevation: 727 m (2,385 ft)

Population (2025-12-31)
  - Total: 1,718
  - Density: 115.7/km^{2} (299.6/sq mi)
- Time zone: UTC+01:00 (CET)
  - Summer (DST): UTC+02:00 (CEST)
- Postal codes: 78589
- Dialling codes: 07424
- Vehicle registration: TUT
- Website: www.duerbheim.de

Dürbheim is a municipality in the district of Tuttlingen in Baden-Württemberg in Germany.
