= Bubsheim =

- Municipality
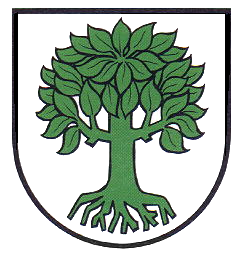
- Coat of arms

- Location of Bubsheim within Tuttlingen district
- Interactive map of Bubsheim
- Location within Germany Location within Baden-Württemberg
- Coordinates: 48°07′10″N 08°49′46″E
- Country: Germany
- State: Baden-Württemberg
- Admin. region: Freiburg
- District: Tuttlingen

Government
  - Mayor (2020–28): Thomas Leibinger

Area
  - Total: 8.29 km^{2} (3.20 sq mi)
- Elevation: 909 m (2,982 ft)

Population (2025-12-31)
  - Total: 1,447
  - Density: 175/km^{2} (452/sq mi)
- Time zone: UTC+01:00 (CET)
  - Summer (DST): UTC+02:00 (CEST)
- Postal codes: 78585
- Dialling codes: 07429
- Vehicle registration: TUT
- Website: www.bubsheim.de

Bubsheim is a municipality in the district of Tuttlingen in Baden-Württemberg in Germany.

== Mayor ==
In January 2012 Thomas Leibinger was elected the new mayor.
