= Wehingen =

- Municipality
- Coat of arms

- Location of Wehingen within Tuttlingen district
- Interactive map of Wehingen
- Location within Germany Location within Baden-Württemberg
- Coordinates: 48°08′51″N 08°47′33″E
- Country: Germany
- State: Baden-Württemberg
- Admin. region: Freiburg
- District: Tuttlingen

Government
  - Mayor (2016–24): Gerhard Reichegger

Area
  - Total: 14.59 km^{2} (5.63 sq mi)
- Elevation: 752–1,005 m (2,467–3,297 ft)

Population (2025-12-31)
  - Total: 3,692
  - Density: 253.1/km^{2} (655.4/sq mi)
- Time zone: UTC+01:00 (CET)
  - Summer (DST): UTC+02:00 (CEST)
- Postal codes: 78564
- Dialling codes: 07426
- Vehicle registration: TUT
- Website: www.wehingen.de

Wehingen is a town in the district of Tuttlingen in Baden-Württemberg in Germany.
