= Freiburg (region) =

Administrative area in Baden-Württemberg, Germany

Coordinates: 48°00′N 8°20′E

- Regierungsbezirk
- Map of Baden-Württemberg highlighting Freiburg
- Country: Germany
- State: Baden-Württemberg
- Region seat: Freiburg

Government
  - District President: Carsten Gabbert (Greens)

Area
  - Total: 9,347 km^{2} (3,609 sq mi)

Population (31 December 2025)
  - Total: 2,327,252
  - Density: 249.0/km^{2} (644.9/sq mi)

GDP
  - Total: €108.785 billion (2024)
  - Per capita: €46,789 (2024)
- Website: https://rp.baden-wuerttemberg.de/rpf/Seiten/default.aspx

Freiburg is one of the four administrative divisions (German: Regierungsbezirke) of Baden-Württemberg, Germany, located in the south-west of the country. It covers the Black Forest (Schwarzwald) hills as well as the Rhine valley. It is sub-divided into the three regions (Regionalverband) of Hochrhein-Bodensee, Schwarzwald-Baar-Heuberg and Südlicher Oberrhein. It is divided into nine districts and 294 municipalities.

Kreise
(districts)
1. Breisgau-Hochschwarzwald
2. Emmendingen
3. Constance (Konstanz)
4. Lörrach
5. Ortenaukreis
6. Rottweil
7. Schwarzwald-Baar
8. Tuttlingen
9. Waldshut
Kreisfreie Städte'
(district-free towns)
1. Freiburg

== Economy ==
The Gross domestic product (GDP) of the region was 86.9 billion € in 2018, accounting for 2.6% of German economic output. GDP per capita adjusted for purchasing power was €35,300 or 117% of the EU27 average in the same year. The GDP per employee was 97% of the EU average.

The district is served by EuroAirport Basel Mulhouse Freiburg close to the borders of both Germany, France and Switzerland, 70 km (43 mi) south of Freiburg. However, other nearby airports such as Karlsruhe/Baden-Baden Airport, Stuttgart Airport, Strasbourg Airport, and Zurich Airport are also used by air travellers from the district.
