= Hochberg (Swabian Jura) =

- Location within Baden-Württemberg

Highest point
- Elevation: 1,008.9 m (3,310 ft)
- Prominence: 44 m (144 ft)
- Parent peak: Oberhohenberg (line parent)
- Isolation: 0.75 km (0.47 mi) to Lemberg
- Coordinates: 48°09′24″N 08°45′22″E

Geography
- Location: Baden-Württemberg, Germany

The Hochberg (German pronunciation: [ˈhoːxˌbɛʁk]) is a hill of the Swabian Jura in Baden-Württemberg, Germany. It is one of the tourist-promoted "ten thousanders."
