= Hummelsberg (Swabian Jura) =

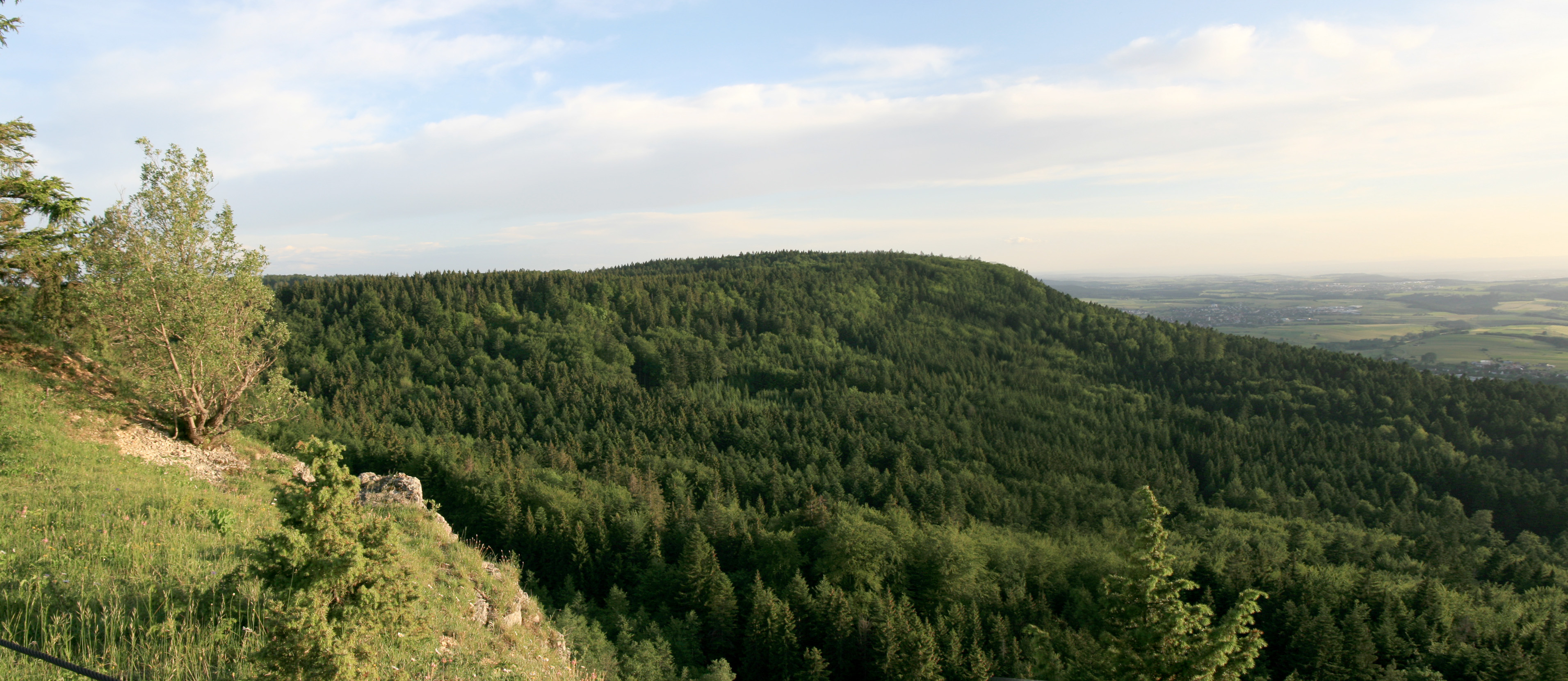
- The Hummelsberg

Highest point
- Elevation: 1,002.1 m above sea level (NHN) (3,288 ft)
- Prominence: 32 m (105 ft)
- Parent peak: Hochwald in the Hochwald forest area (line parent)
- Isolation: 1.89 km (1.17 mi) to Hochwald
- Coordinates: 48°7.11′N 8°45.88′E

Geography
- Location within Baden-Württemberg
- Location: Gosheim, Tuttlingen, Baden-Württemberg
- Parent range: Swabian Jura

Geology
- Rock type: White Jurassic

The Hummelsberg is a 1,002.1 m above sea level (NHN) tall hill on the southwestern edge of the Swabian Jura northeast of the village of Denkingen in the German county of Tuttlingen.

The Hummelsberg is part of the so-called ten thousanders – the ten elevations of the Swabian Jura that reach a height of 1,000 metres or more – in the area of the Großer Heuberg. Together with the Kehlen and the Hochwald, it forms a hill chain that continues south as far as the Dreifaltigkeitsberg. In outstanding weather conditions the view from the Hummelsberg may reach the northernmost summits of the Swiss Alps to the south and the Black Forest to the west.

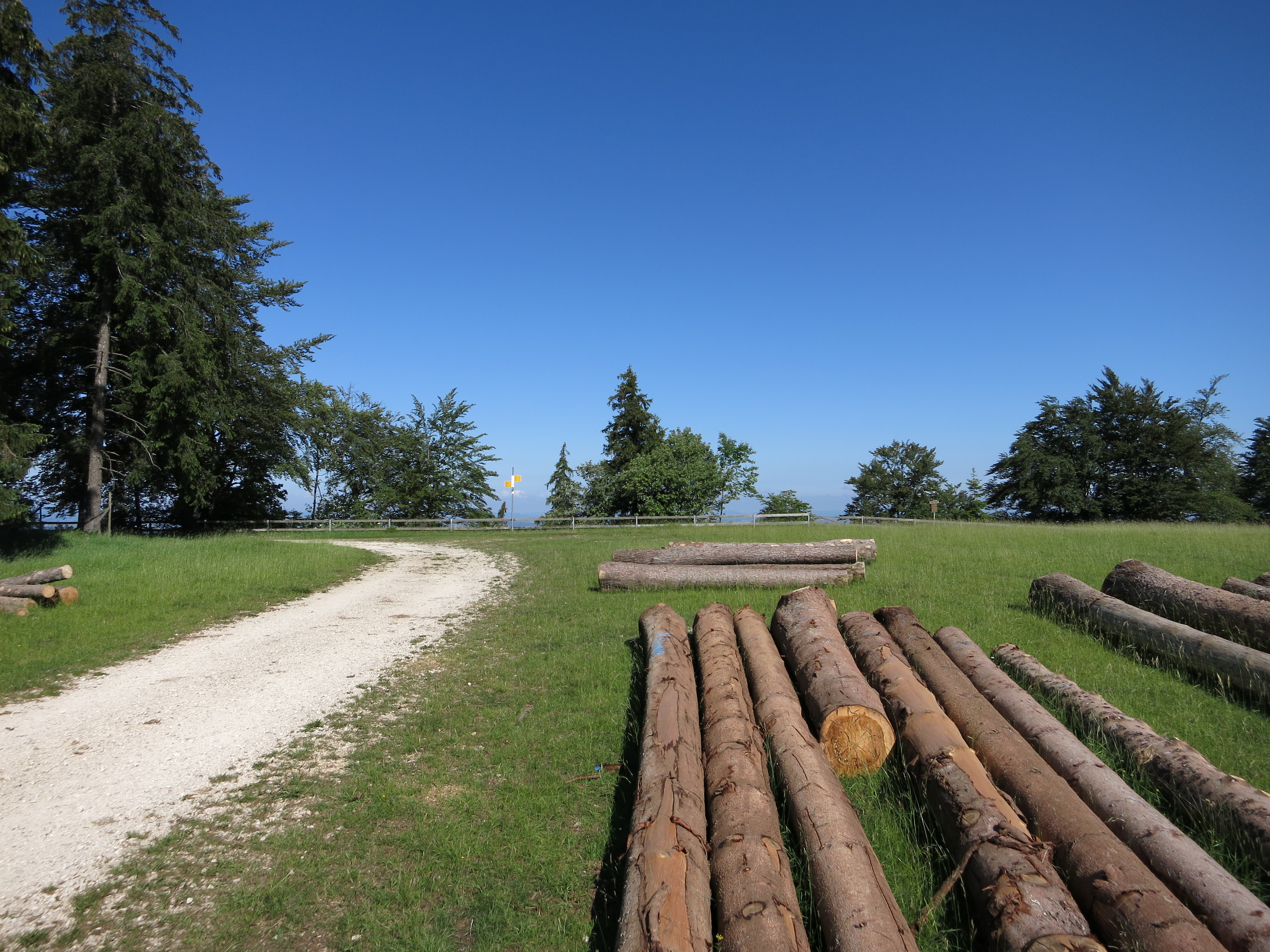
On the Hummelsberg

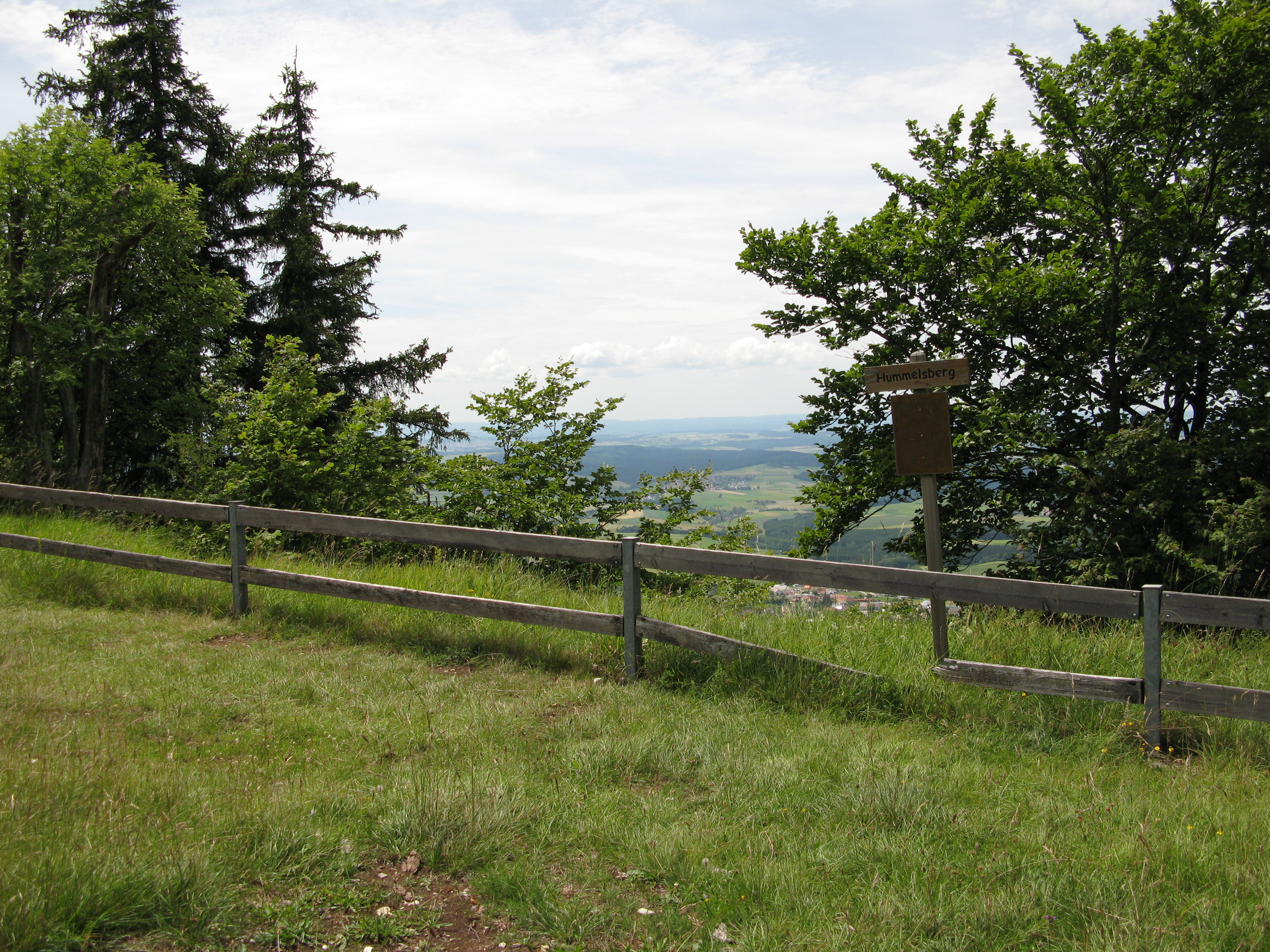
View from the Hummelsberg

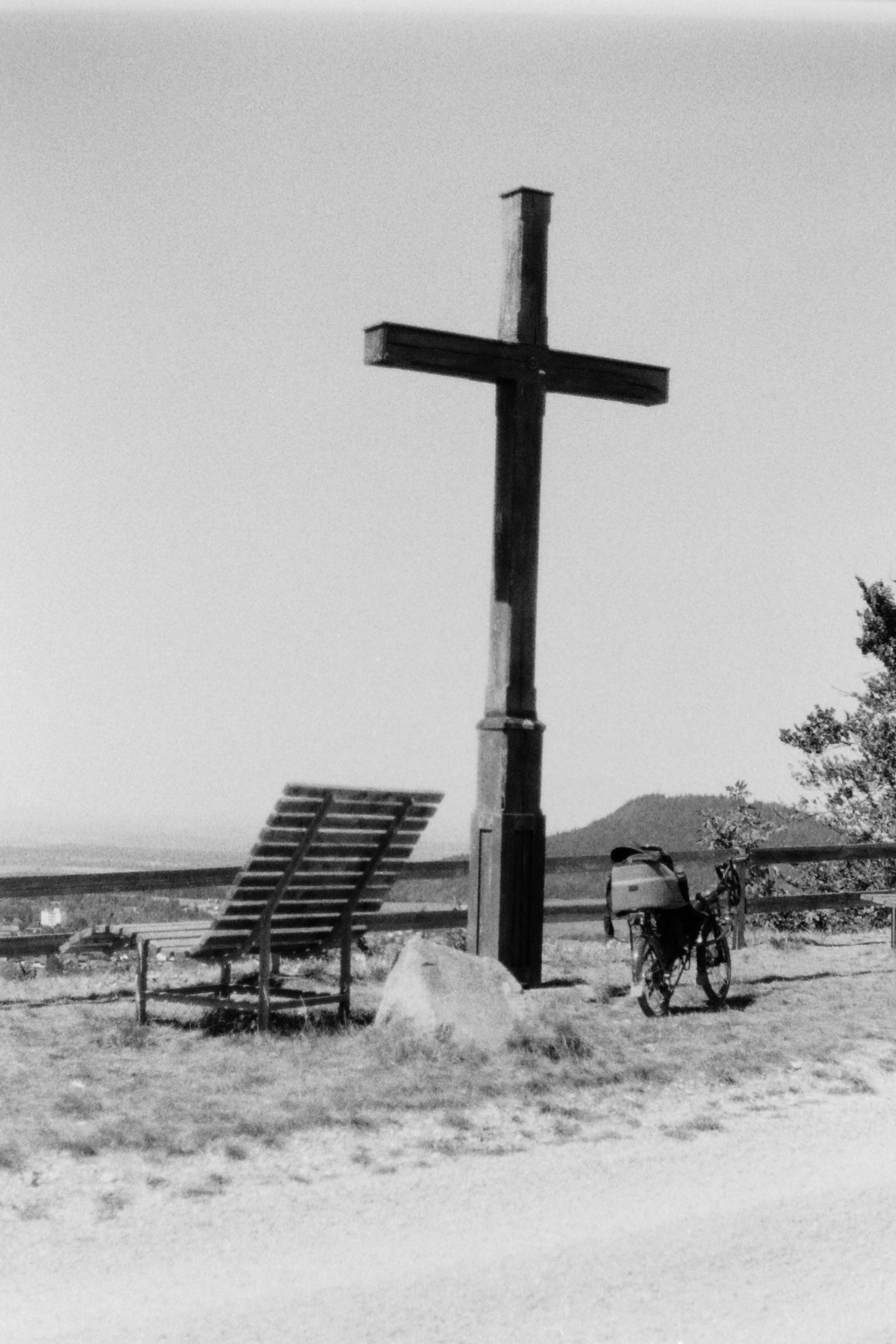
The cross on top of the Hummelsberg
