= Region of the 10 Thousanders =

German state of Baden-Württemberg

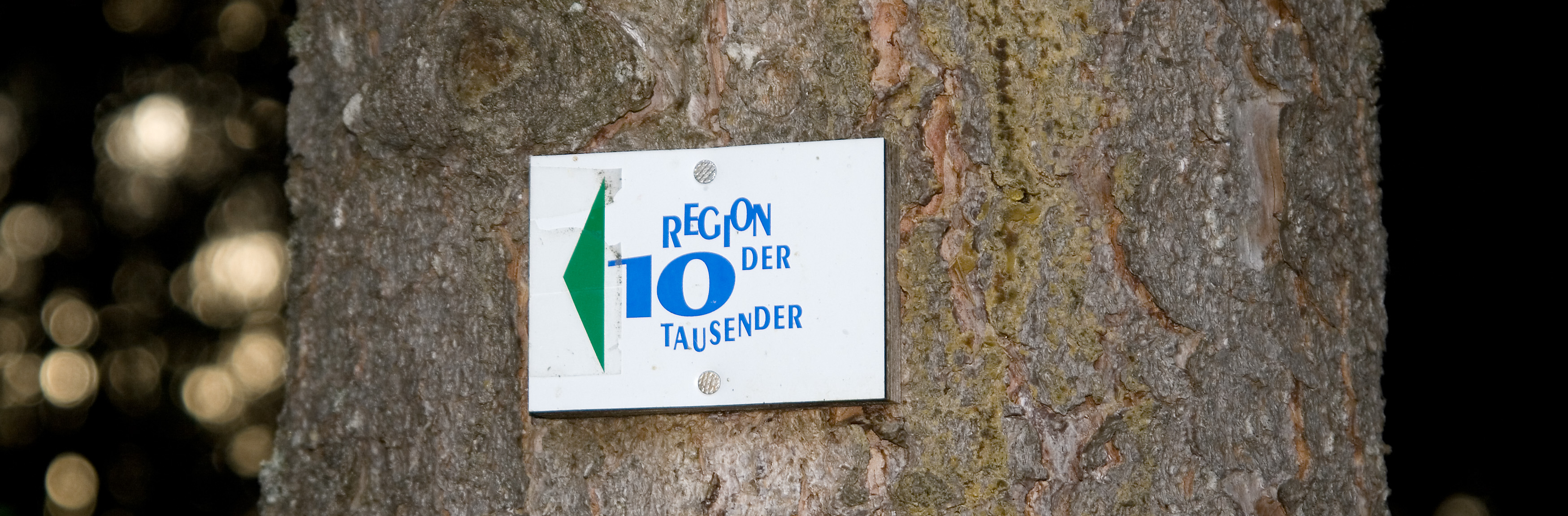
Logo of the "Region of the 10 Thousanders" as a signpost

location of the region in Baden-Württemberg

The Region of the 10 Thousanders (German: Region der 10 Tausender) is a region in the Swabian Jura in the German state of Baden-Württemberg, the name of which alludes to the absoluate elevation of the summits in the area.

Almost all of the highest summits of the Swabian Jura (each over 1,000 m above sea level (NHN)), including their highest summit (1,015.3 m), are located in this relatively small region which only covers 20 km^{2} around Deilingen, Wehingen and Gosheim in the southwestern Jura.

The name "Region of the 10 Thousanders" goes back to an action group that was initiated by various restaurants and municipalities of the Heuberg to promote regional tourism.

The 10 "thousanders" are – sorted by height in metres (m) above sea level (NHN):

1. Lemberg (1,015.3 m), near Gosheim, highest mountain of the Swabian Jura (48°9′2.8″N 8°44′57.4″E)
2. Oberhohenberg (1,010.7 m), near Schörzingen (48°9′50.6″N 8°45′38.3″E)
3. Hochberg (1,008.5 m), near Delkhofen (48°9′24.3″N 8°45′22.6″E)
4. Wandbühl (1,006.7 m), near Delkhofen (48°10′45.6″N 8°48′32.1″E)
5. Rainen (1,006.1 m), near Deilingen (48°10′45.4″N 8°48′32.6″E)
6. Montschenloch (1,004.4 m), near Delkhofen (48°10′8.9″N 8°47′37.5″E)
7. Hochwald (1,002.6 m), near Gosheim (48°7′59.8″N 8°46′32.4″E)
8. Bol (1,002.3 m), a ridge prominence of Wandbühl near Deilingen (48°10′15.9″N 8°48′18.3″E)
9. Hummelsberg (1,001.6 m), near Denkingen (48°7′4″N 8°45′49.3″E)
10. Kehlen (1,001.3 m), near Gosheim (48°7′42.5″N 8°46′29.2″E)

The following form fairly unified high mountain chains which makes them difficult to identify for those not acquainted with the area:

- Lemberg, Hochberg, Oberhohenberg
- Hochwald, Kehlen, Hummelsberg
- Wandbühl, Montschenloch, Bol, Rainen

The two other Jura peaks that are over 1,000 m, the 1,001.6 m high and very striking Plettenberg (48°12′49″N 8°48′27″E) near Dotternhausen and the 999.8 m high Schafberg (48°13′12″N 8°50′18″E) near Hausen am Tann lies roughly 8 km north-northeast and are not counted within the 10 Thousanders.

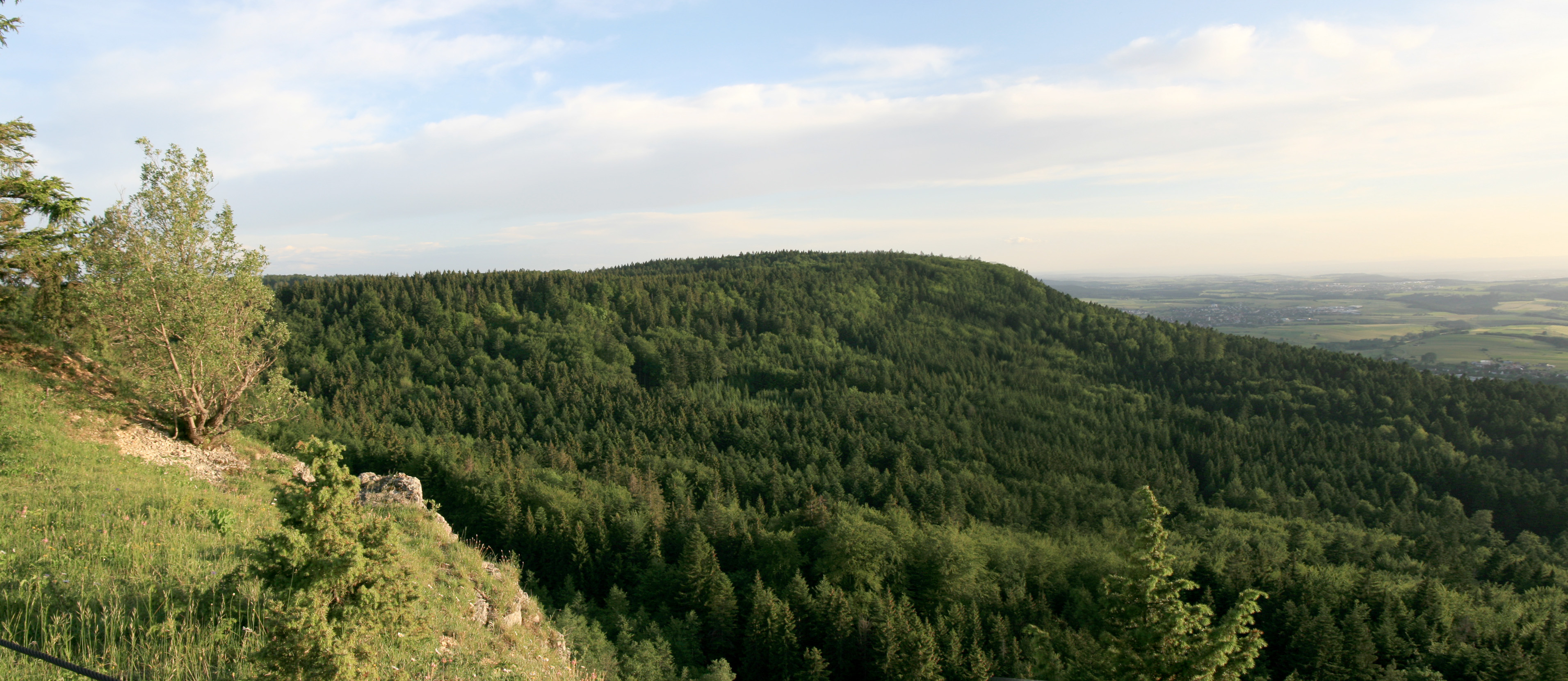
The Hummelsberg (1,001.6 m)

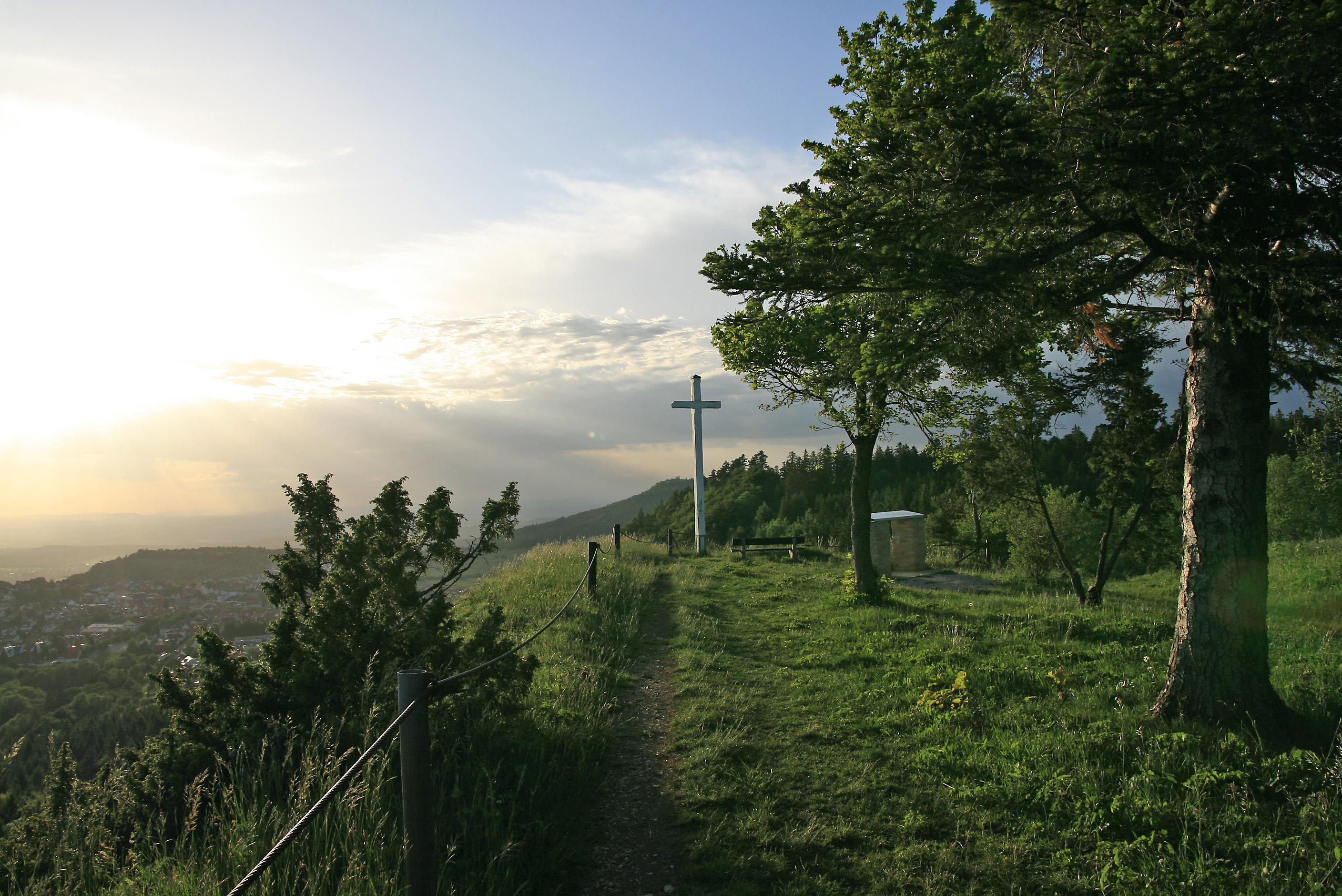
The way to the White Cross on the Kehlen (1,001.3 m)

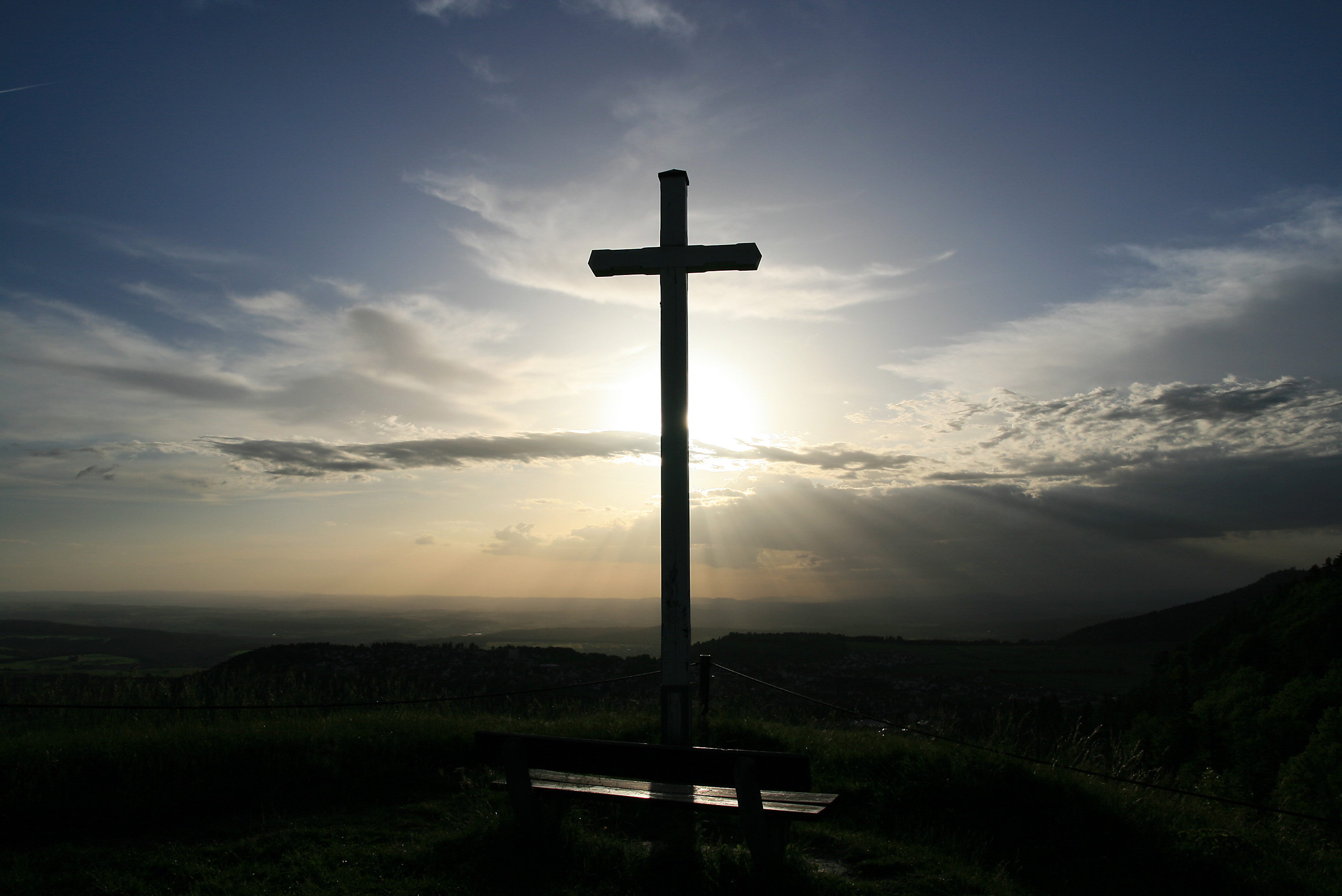
The White Cross on the Kehlen

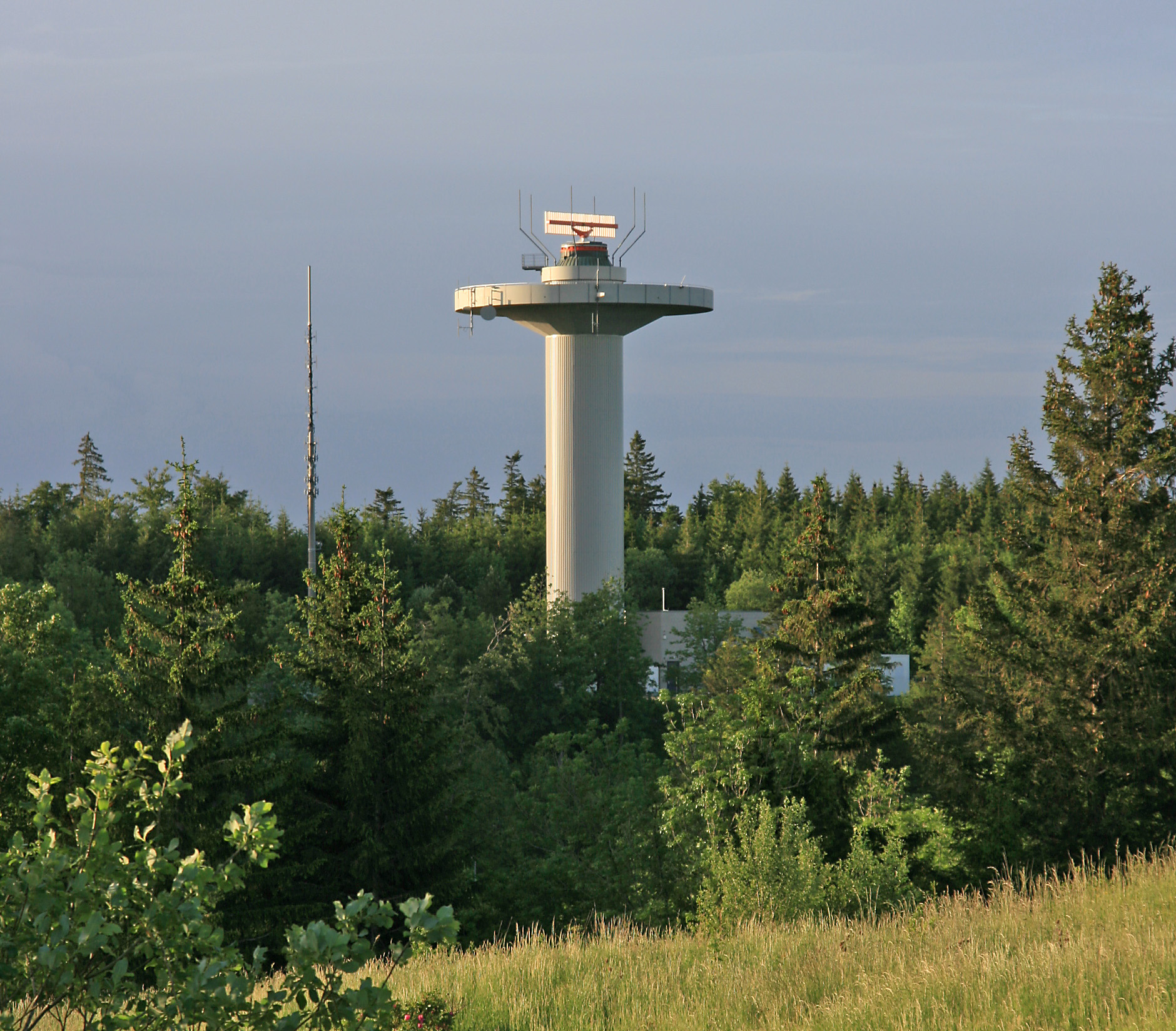
The radar tower on the Hochwald (1,001.9 m)

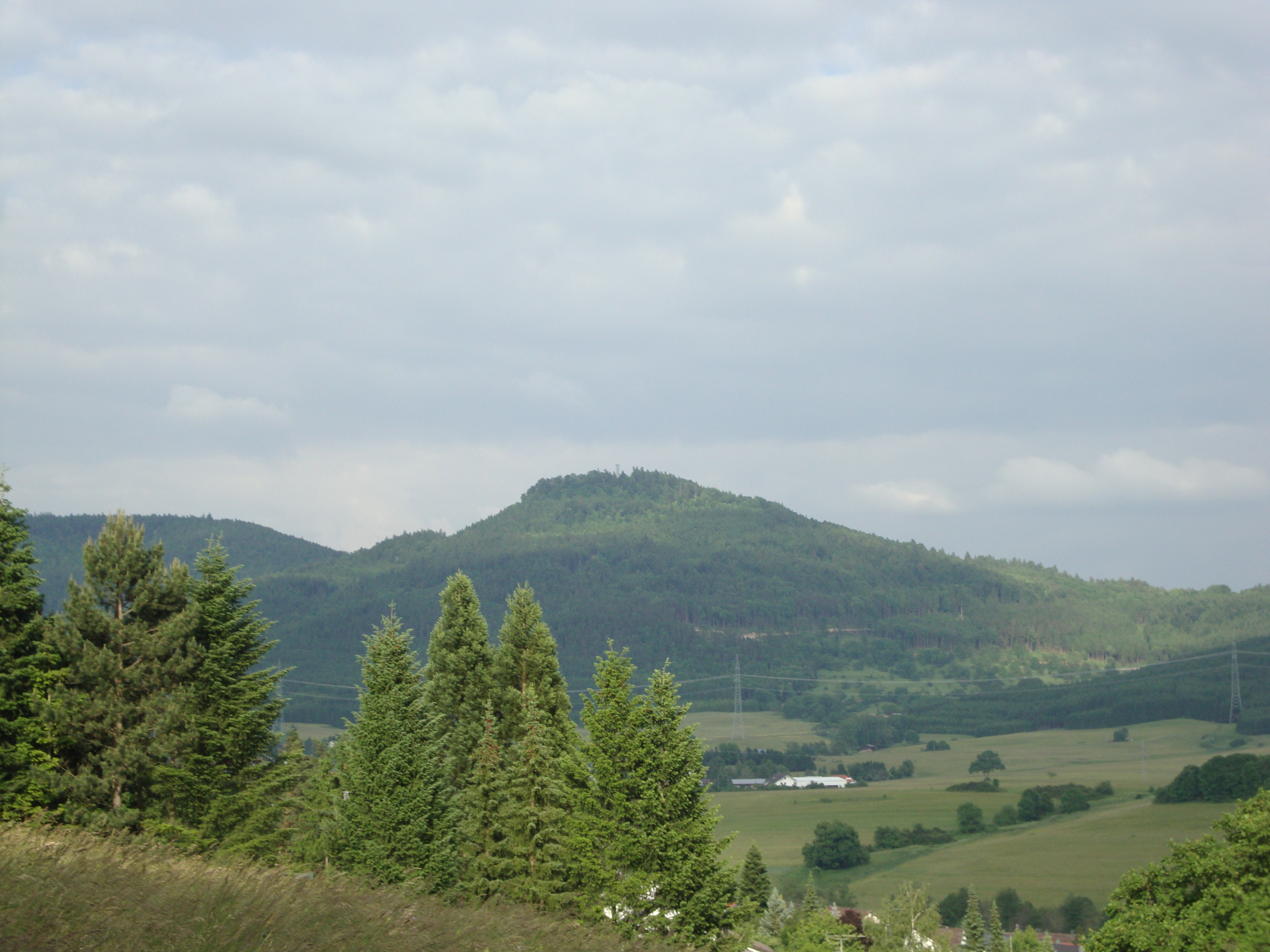
The Lemberg (1,015.3 m) – highest mountain in the Swabian Jura

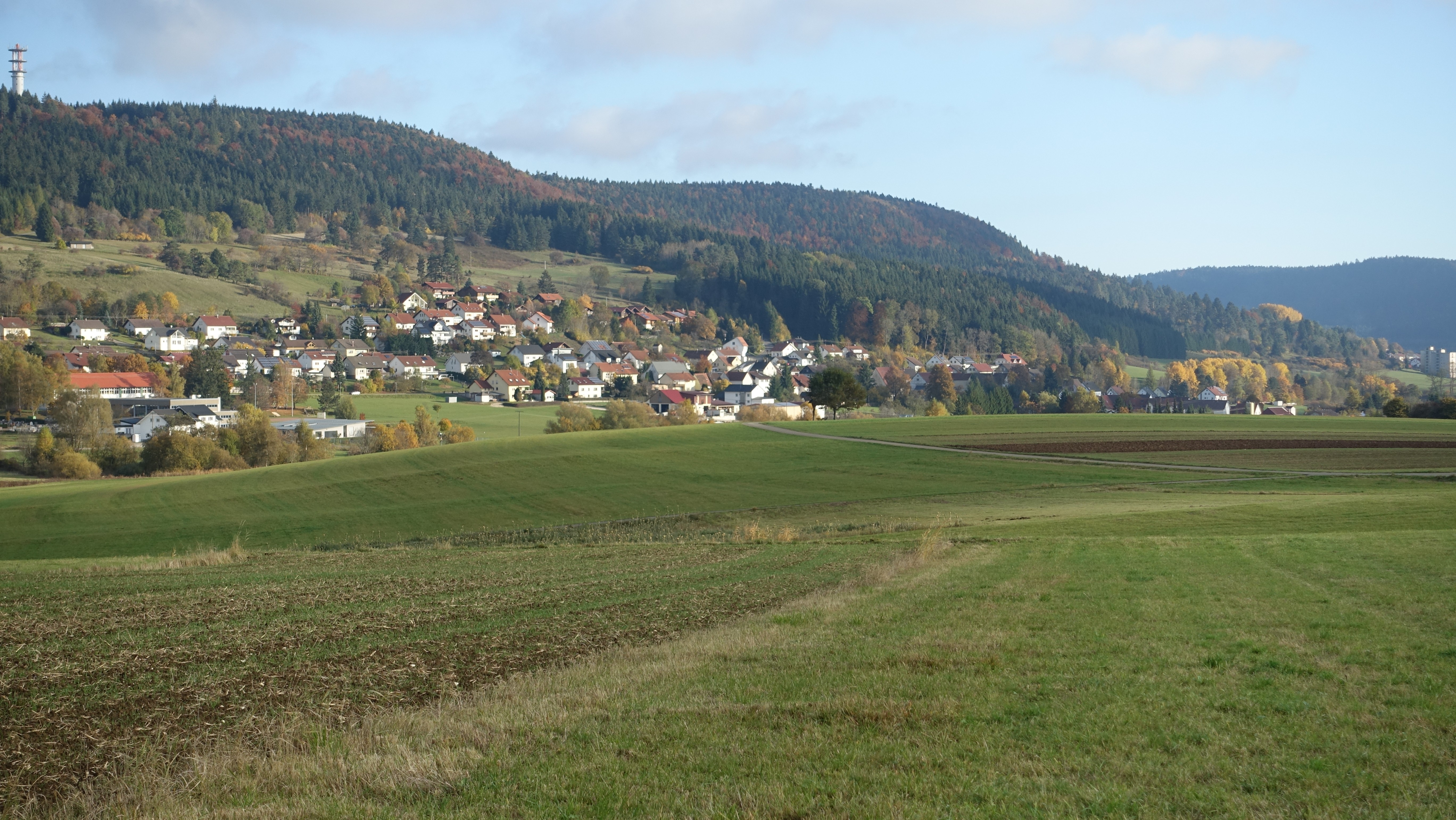
Deilingen. Behind: the Montschenloch (1,004. m) with its transmission tower

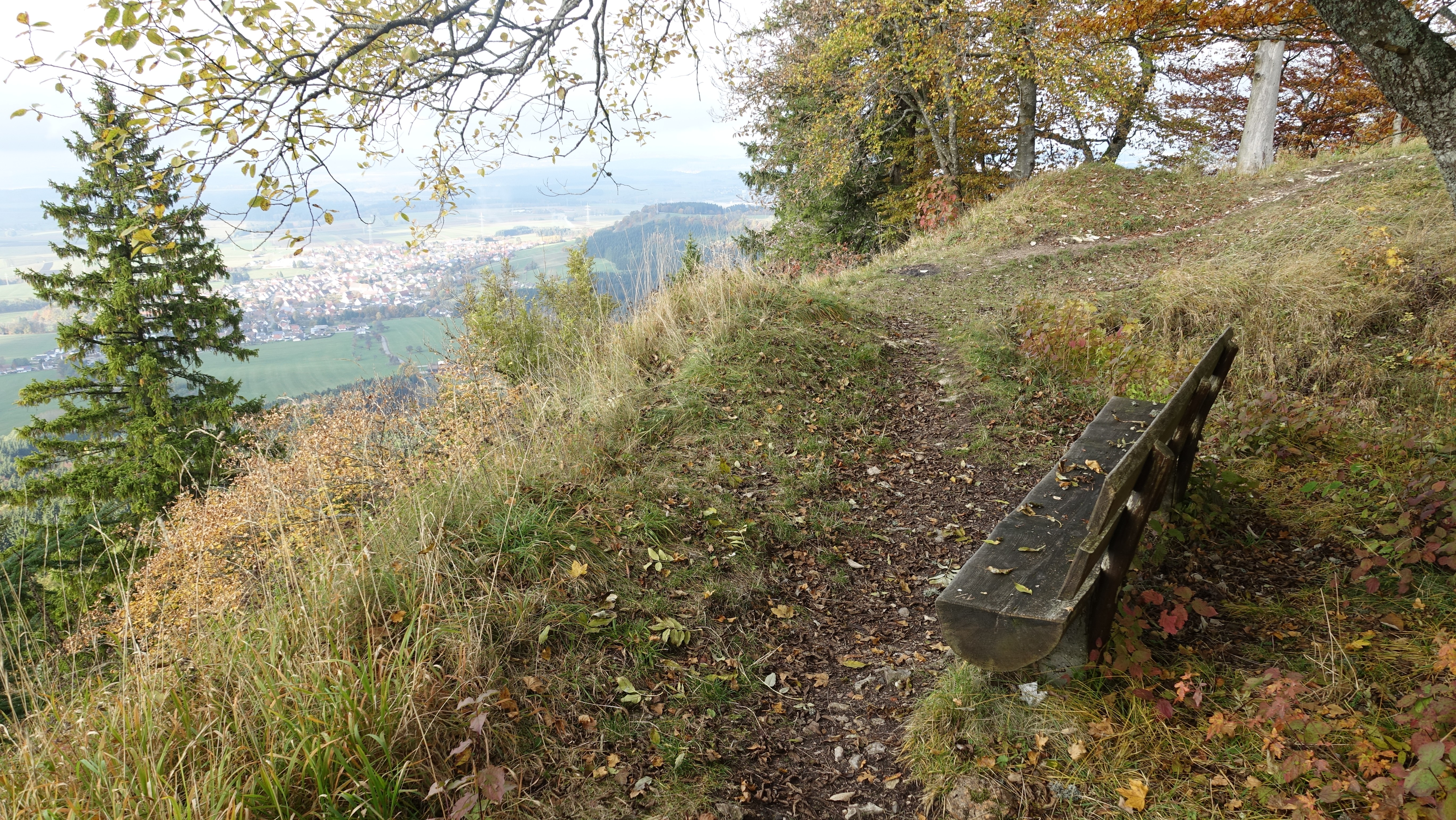
On the Oberhohenberg (1,010.7 m) – second highest elevation of the Swabian Jura
