= Kehlen (mountain) =

Mountain in Germany

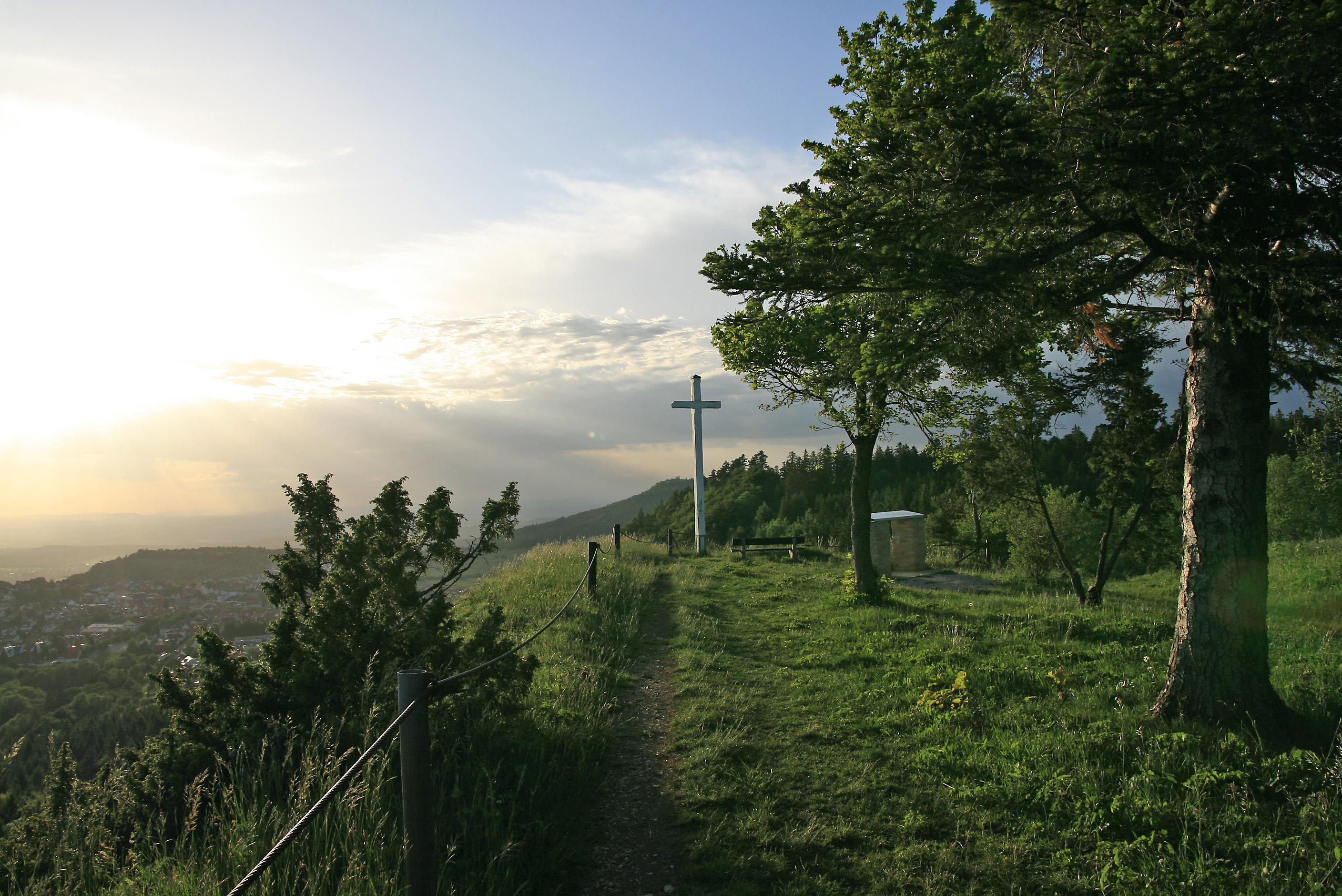
- The summit of the Kehlen with its so-called "White Cross".

Highest point
- Elevation: 1,001 m above sea level (NHN) (3,284 ft)
- Isolation: 0.48 km (0.30 mi) to Hochwald
- Coordinates: 48°07′42″N 8°46′30″E

Geography
- Location within Baden-Württemberg
- Location: Gosheim, Tuttlingen, Baden-Württemberg
- Parent range: Swabian Jura

Geology
- Rock type: White Jurassic

Kehlen is a mountain in the Swabian Jura near Gosheim in the county of Tuttlingen. It belongs to the Region of the 10 Thousanders. Its summit lies directly on the Albtrauf and offers a view of the plain and the Black Forest. It is 1,001 metres high.

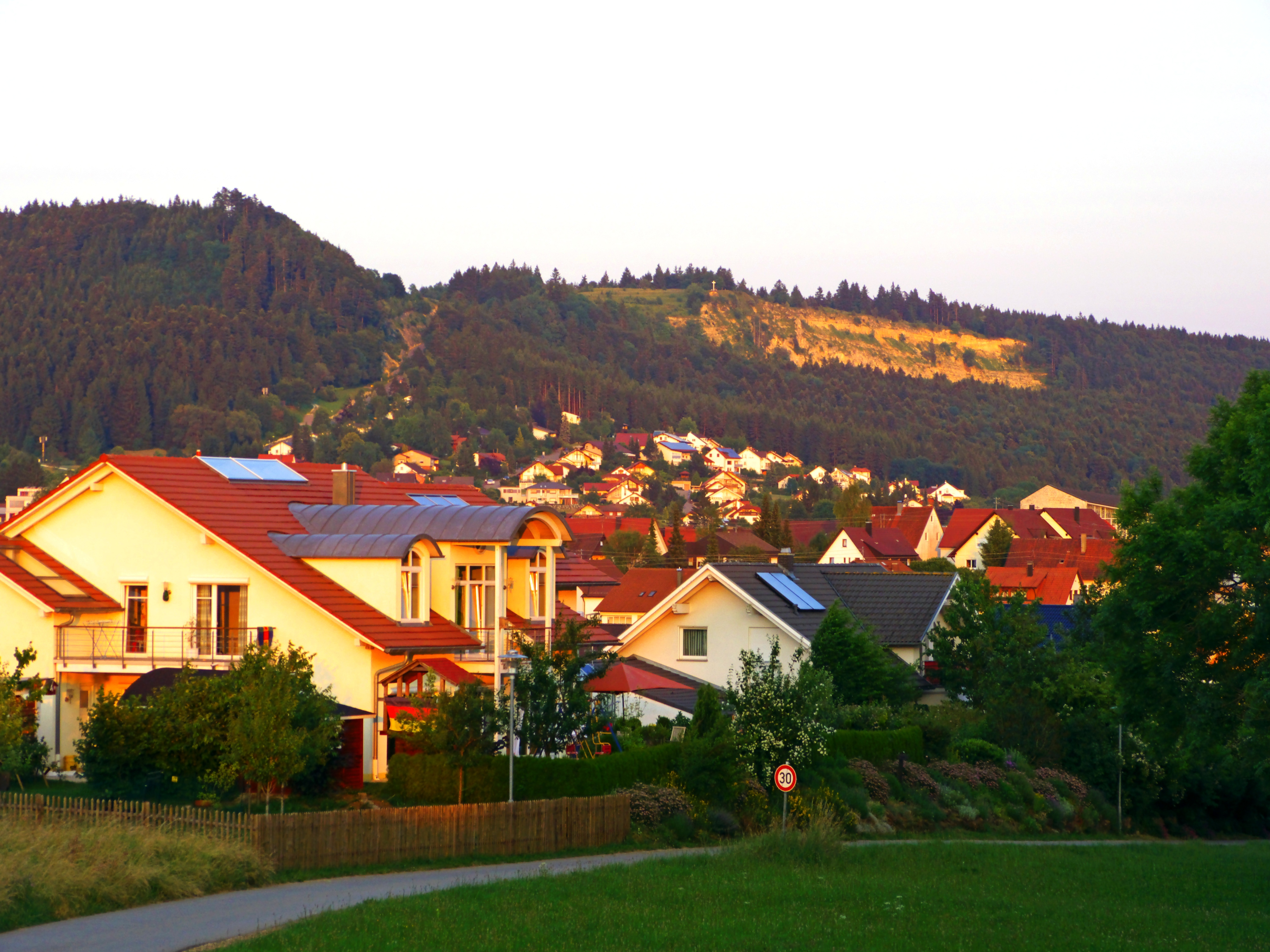
The Kehlen (1,001 m, right); and the Hochwald (1,002 m, left) seen from Gosheim (850 m).
