= Wen Valley =

Coordinates: 48°44′2″N 10°00′58″E

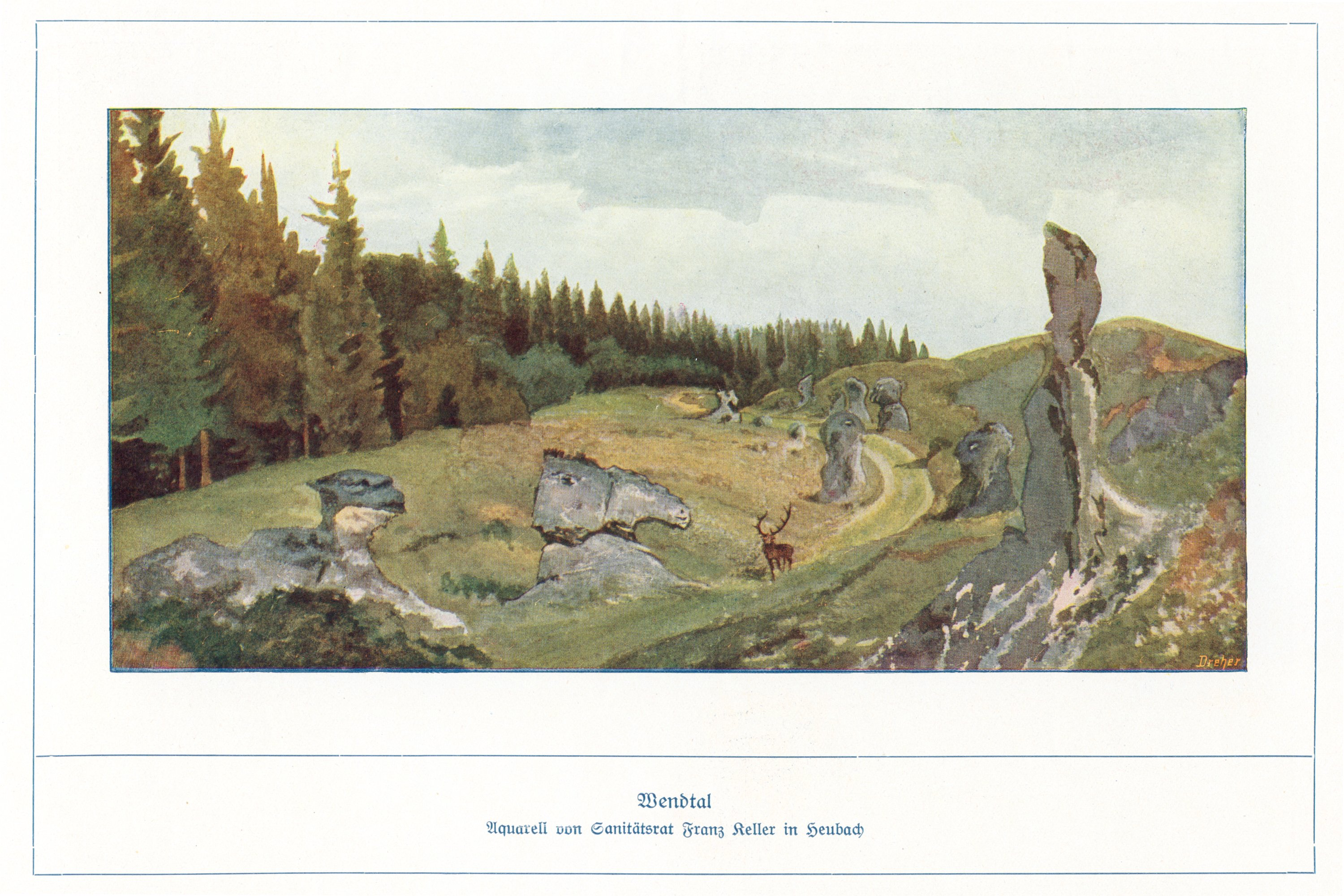
Wental - Painting from Franz Keller in the early 1900s

Wen Valley (German: Wental) is a typical dry valley of the Schwäbische Alb northwest of Steinheim am Albuch. Wen Valley is a popular recreation area and until 2009 it was popular for cross golf, parkour and bouldering, but this is since June 2009 as compensation for the erection of Essingen Windpark prohibited. Several signs indicate this.

There are several remarkable limestone rocks, which were given names like sphinx, hippopotamus or deer rock. The valley starts near Bartholomä and runs southward.

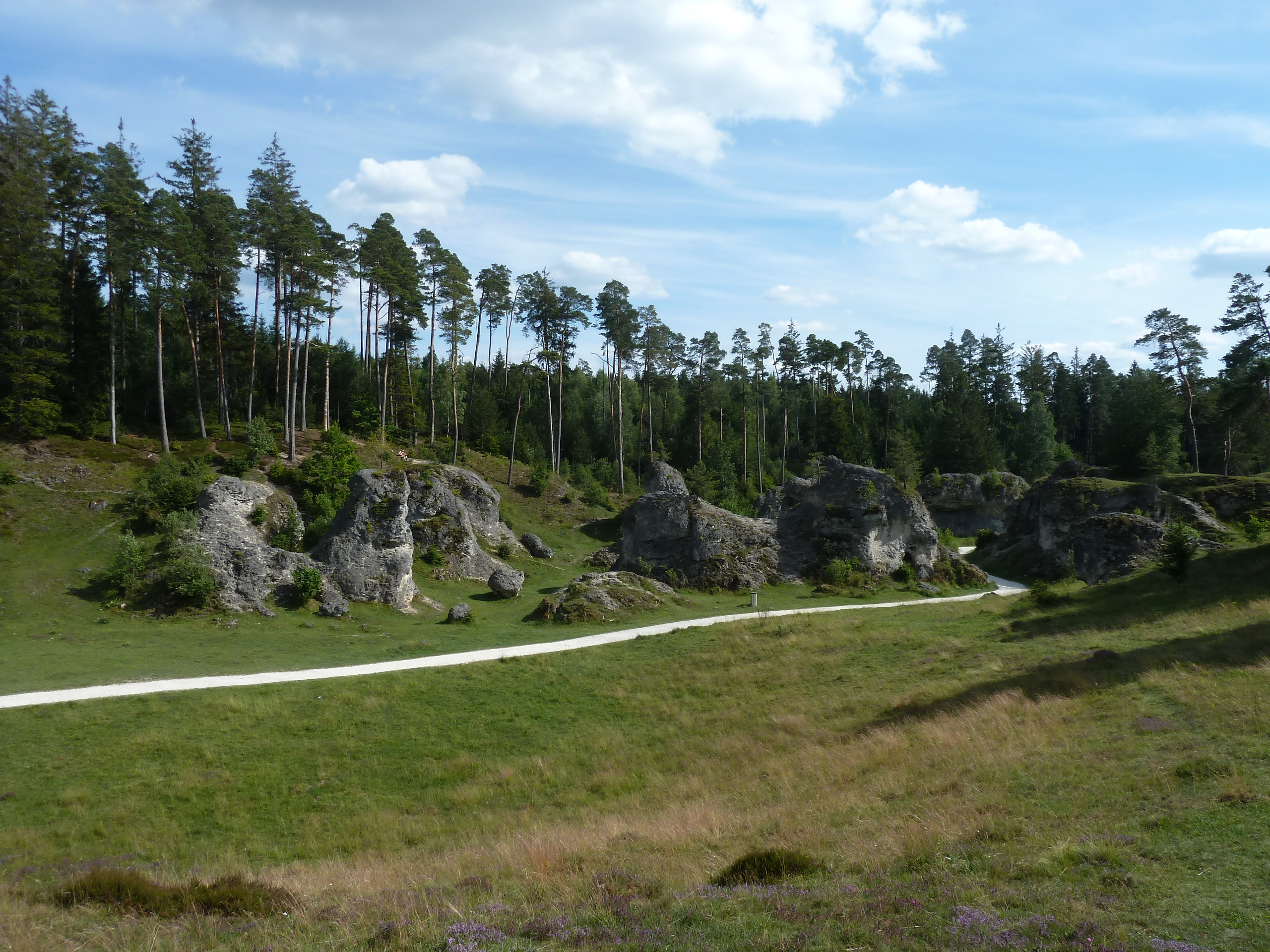
Wen valley, north entrance

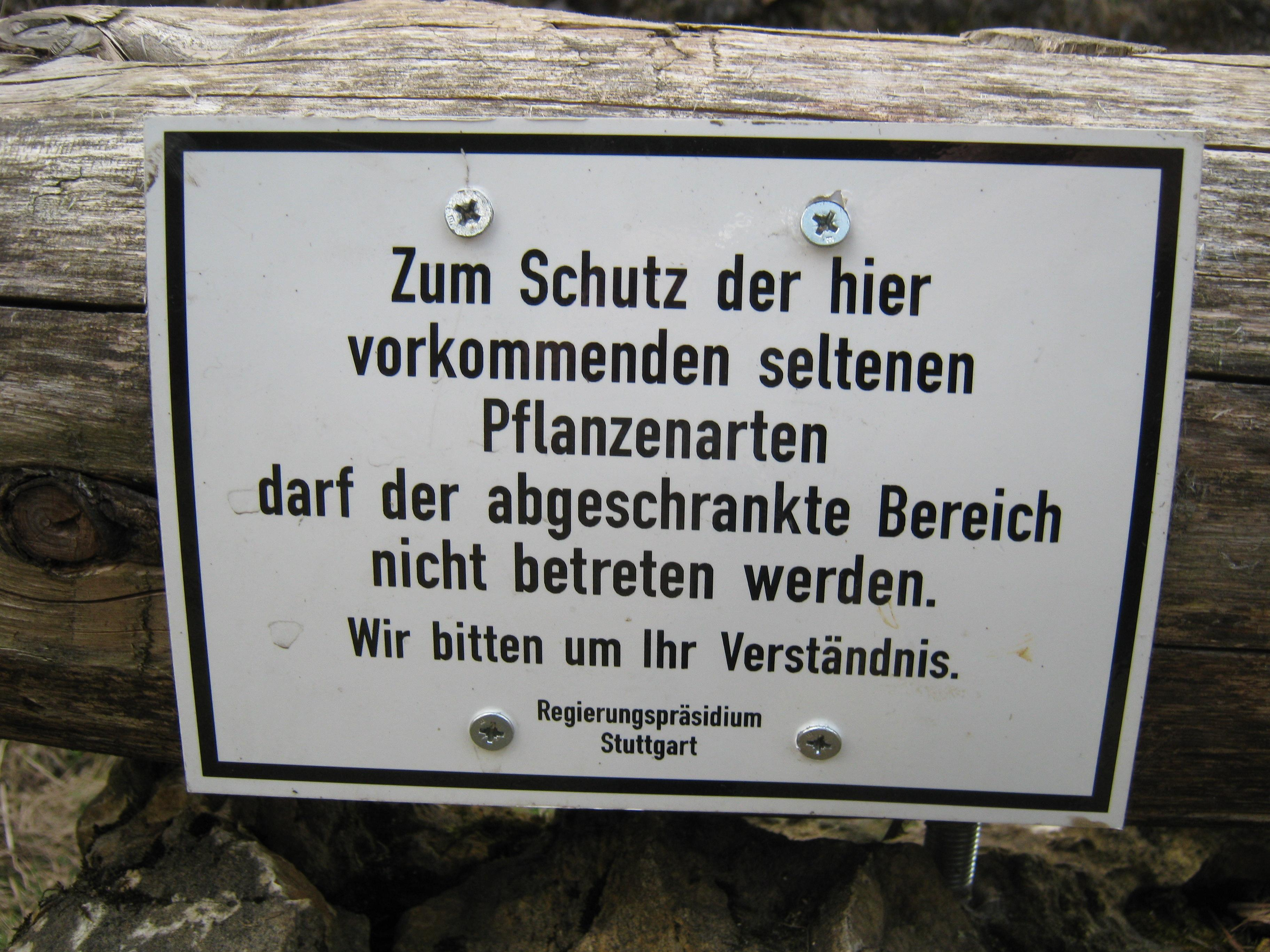
Sign indicating an area in Wen Valley prohibited to enter

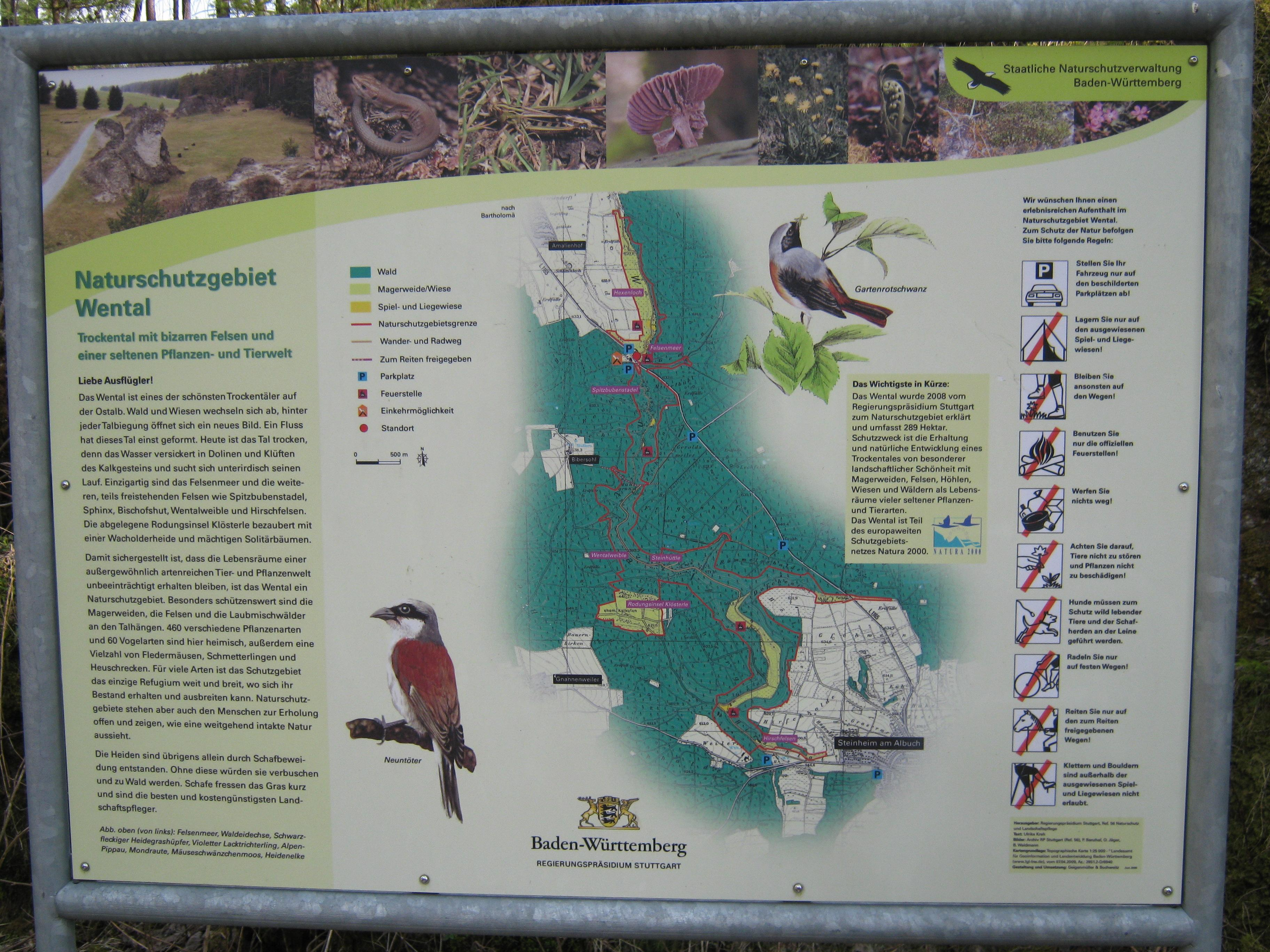
Information billboard concerning protected areas

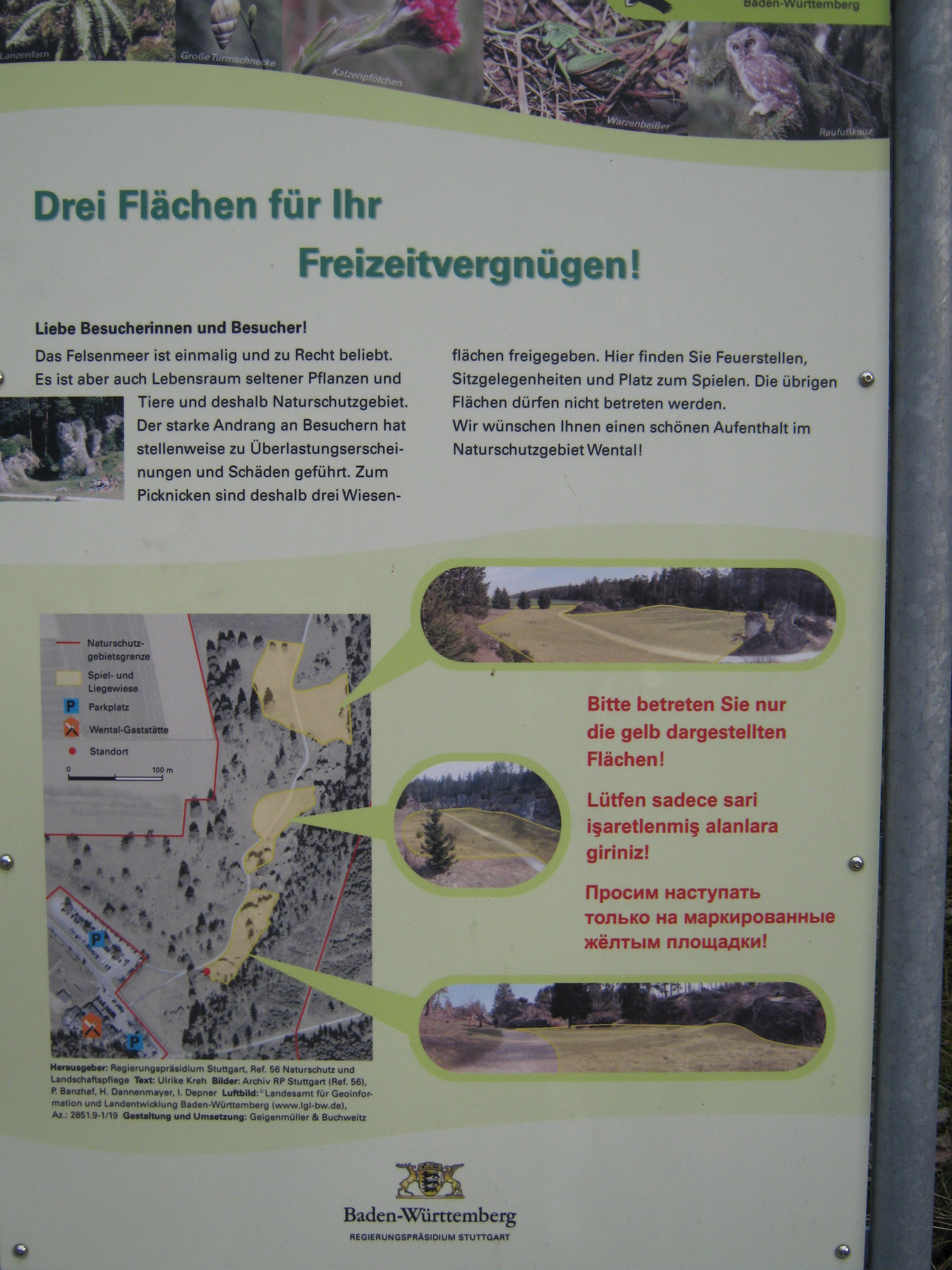
Information billboard showing areas in Wen Valley to be entered
