= Swabian Jura =

Mountain range in Baden-Württemberg, Germany

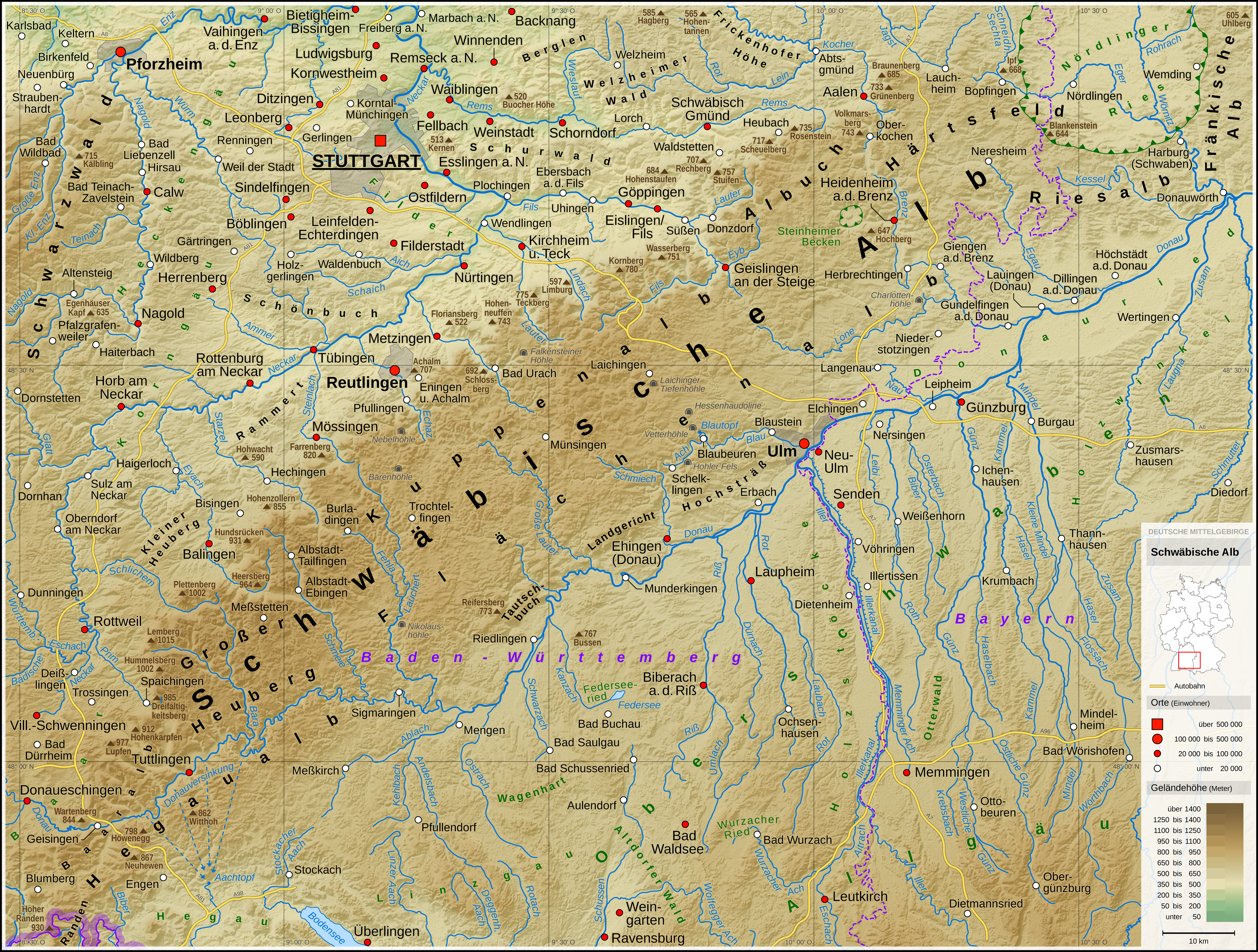
Map of the Swabian Jura

Drone views of Swabian Jura by DW

The Swabian Jura (German: Schwäbische Alb [ˈʃvɛːbɪʃə ˈʔalp], more rarely Schwäbischer Jura [ˈʃvɛːbɪʃɐ ˈjuːʁa]), sometimes also named Swabian Alps in English, is a mountain range in Baden-Württemberg, Germany, extending 220 km (140 mi) from southwest to northeast and 40 to 70 km (25 to 43 mi) in width. It is named after the region of Swabia. It is part of the Table Jura (Tafeljura).

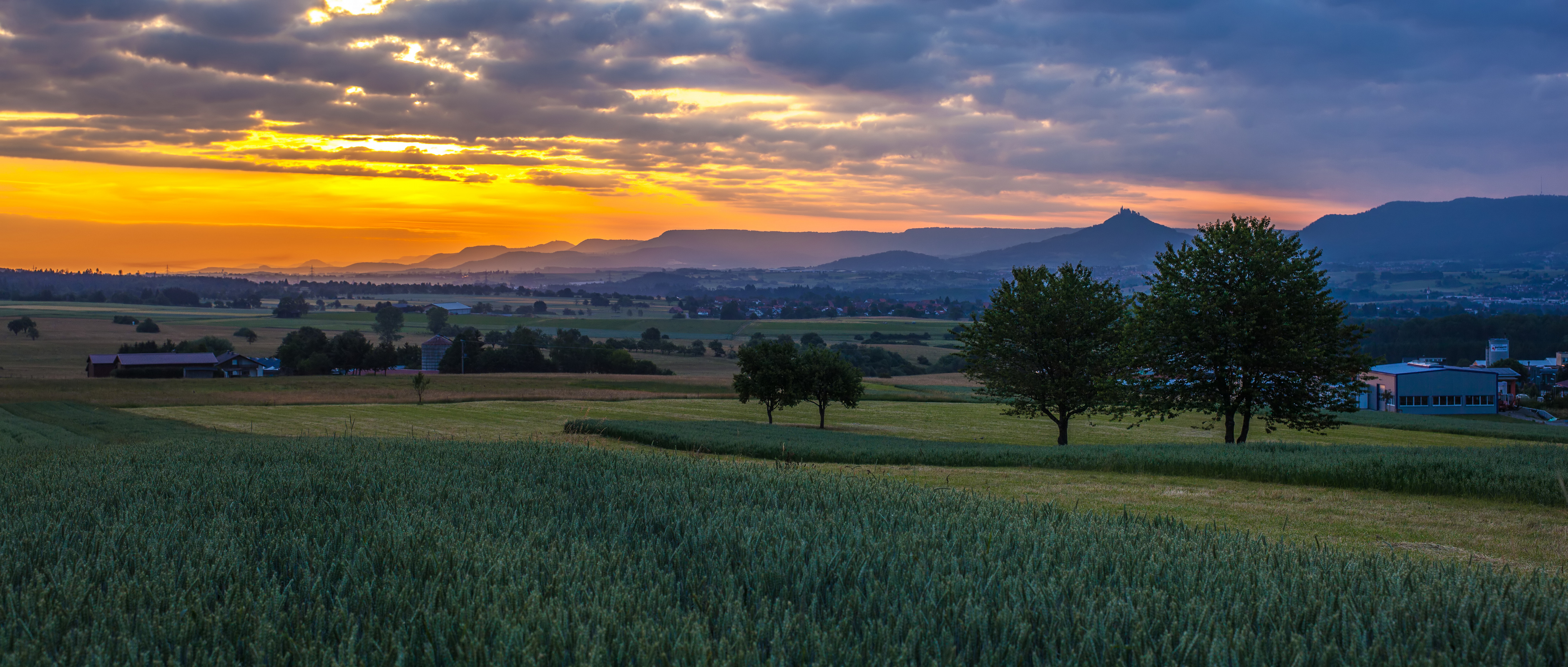
The western Swabian Jura region

The Swabian Jura occupies the region bounded by the Danube in the southeast and the upper Neckar in the northwest. In the southwest it rises to the higher mountains of the Black Forest. The highest mountain in the region is the Lemberg (1,015 m (3,330 ft)). The area's profile resembles a high plateau, which slowly falls away to the southeast. The northwestern edge is a steep escarpment (called the Albtrauf or Albanstieg, rising up 400 m (1,300 ft), covered with forests), while the top is flat or gently rolling.

In economic and cultural terms, the Swabian Jura includes regions just around the mountain range. It is a popular recreation area. The whole Schwäbische Alb area is a UNESCO global geopark covering 6,688 km^{2} (2582 sq mi.); it was designated as a National Geopark in Germany in 2002 and became a member of the European Geoparks Network in 2004; in 2015 it was included in the newly established scheme of UNESCO Global Geoparks. In its central area it comprises a Swabian Alb Biosphere Reserve of 852.69 km^{2} (330 sq. mi.).

== Geology ==
The geology of the Swabian Jura is mostly limestone, which formed the seabed during the Jurassic period. The sea receded 50 million years ago. Three layers of different limestones are stacked over each other to form the range: Black Jurassic, Brown Jurassic, and White Jurassic (the youngest of the three). White Jurassic may be as pure as 99% calcium carbonate. Since limestone is soluble in water, rain seeps through cracks everywhere, forming a karst landscape, featuring subterranean rivers which flow through a large system of caves before they emerge. As a result there are hardly any rivers, lakes or other forms of surface water on the plateau.

In some places, former volcanic activity has left traces, such as maars and hills. In the west, the Zollerngraben (a geological depression in a tectonically active region) sometimes causes mild earthquakes. The Nördlinger Ries is a large meteorite crater (15 million years old).

Tertiary relicts can be found in the southern part of Swabian Jura. Famous locations are known in the Ulm area (e.g., Turritellenplatte of Ermingen).

Constant rain and other weather influences are slowly dissolving the entire range. Each year, it recedes approximately 2 mm (0.08 in). Some millions of years ago, the mountains reached as far as Stuttgart. In some places, the limestone was more resistant to decay and thus the recession of the main range has left small mountains (called "Zeugenberge"—"witness mountains" or outliers; e.g. the Achalm or the Hohenstaufen) which testify to the former territory of the range. The omnipresent caves are great tourist spots, beautiful and not very crowded. Many different types can be found, from dry dripstone caves to caves that can only be entered by boat. Sometimes the discharge of the water from subterranean rivers can be spectacular, too, e.g. the Blautopf, a source for a tributary of the Danube. Also because of the porous limestone, the Danube nearly disappears near Immendingen (in 1911, 1921, 1928 and 1943 it disappeared completely), only to reappear several kilometers further down. Most of the water lost by the Danube resurfaces in the Aachtopf, a spring for a tributary to the Rhine.

The soil is not very fertile, the humus is often as thin as 10 cm (4 in). Many small limestone pebbles are found on the surface.

== Landscape ==
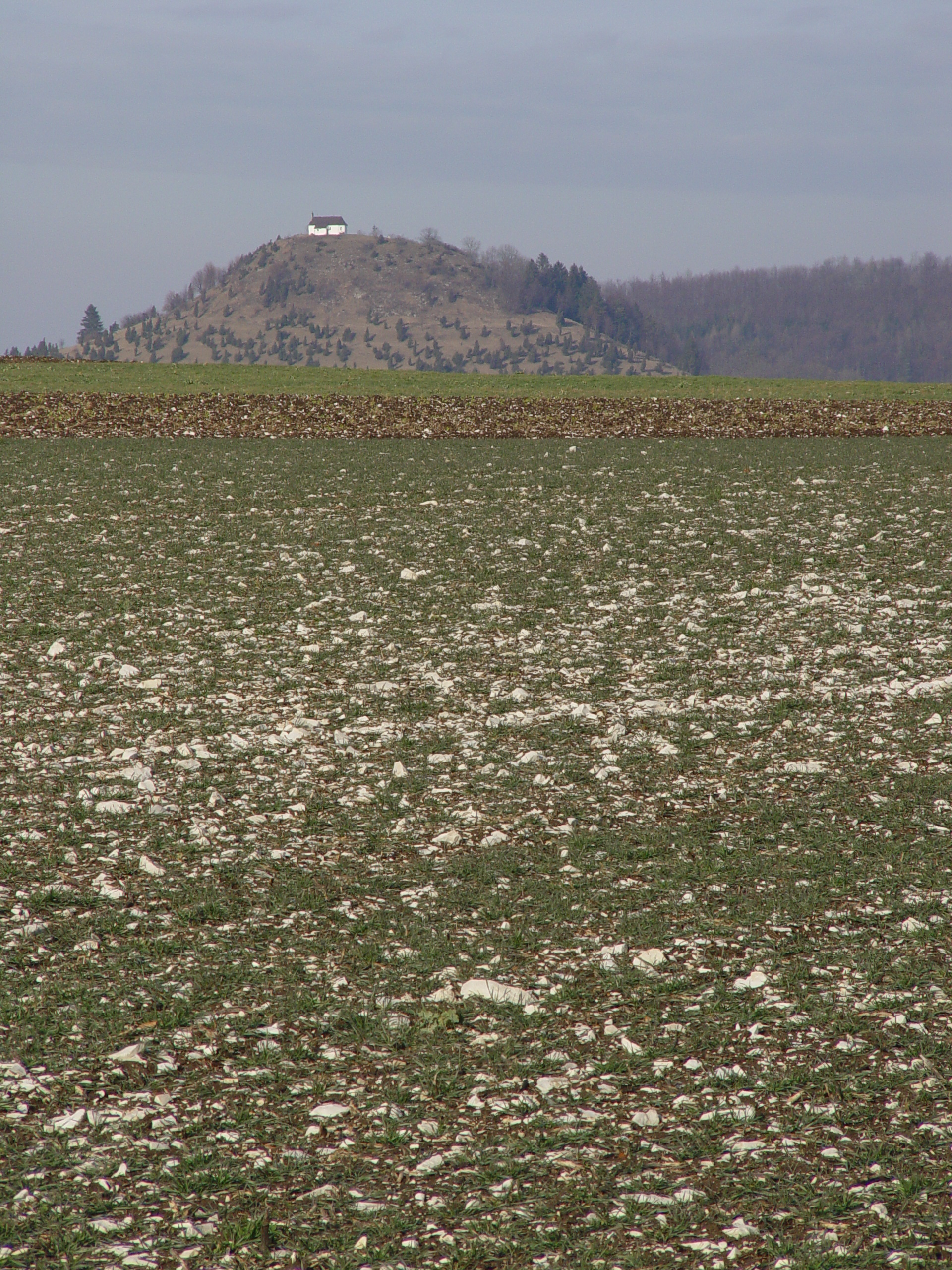
Typical Swabian Jura landscape: the Salmendinger Kapelle (chapel) on top of the Kornbühl

Much of the Swabian Jura consists of gentle to moderate hills often covered with forest or cleared for small-scale agriculture. The traditional landscape was grass fields with juniper bushes. Today this has become a comparatively rare sight. However, in certain places it is protected by the government of Baden-Württemberg.

The highest elevations reach just over 1,000 metres (3,300 ft). They are all in the southwestern part of the Jura, in the region of the Großer Heuberg.

- Lemberg (1,015 metres (3,330 ft), highest point of the Swabian Jura)
- Oberhohenberg (1,011 metres (3,317 ft))
- Hochberg (1,009 metres (3,310 ft))
- Wandbühl (1,007 metres (3,304 ft))
- Rainen (1,006 metres (3,301 ft))
- Montschenloch (1,004 metres (3,294 ft))
- Plettenberg (1,002 metres (3,287 ft))
- Bol (1,002 metres (3,287 ft))
- Hochwald (1,002 metres (3,287 ft))
- Hummelsberg (1,002 metres (3,287 ft))
- Kehlen (1,001 metres (3,284 ft))
- Schafberg (1,000 metres (3,300 ft)).

There are many other peaks in the Alb, such as the Hornau, Ochsenberg, and Achalm.

== Fossils ==
Fossils can be found throughout the Swabian Jura. Many large and important fossils were found here. At Holzmaden, outside of Weilheim unter Teck, a small private museum, called Urwelt-Museum Hauff, provides visitors with the opportunity to "dig" for fossils in their shale deposits. The Urwelt-Museum Hauff houses the world's largest petrified crinoid (sea-lily) colony with a size of 18 m × 6 m (59 ft × 20 ft) and an age of about 180 million years.

== History and culture ==
=== Prehistoric culture ===
In a number of caves (including Vogelherd, Hohlenstein-Stadel, Geißenklösterle and Hohle Fels), all just a few kilometers apart, some of the oldest signs of human artifacts were found. Best known are: a mammoth, a horse head, a water bird, and two statues of a lion man all of surprising quality and all more than 30,000 years old. The oldest known musical instruments have been found here, too: flutes made from the bones of swans and griffon vultures, some 35,000 years old, and in 2004 a flute carved from the tusk of a mammoth dating from the Ice Age, around 37,000 years ago, and the oldest representation of the human body, the Venus of Schelklingen.

More than 3,000 engraved signs have been documented on approximately 260 Aurignacian portable artifacts from the Swabian Jura caves, dated to approximately 40,000–34,000 years ago. Analysis indicated that the repeated lines, dots, and geometric marks exhibited structured patterning and measurable information content, suggesting the use of a conventionalized system of graphic signs.

=== The Roman Empire ===
This region, located south of the limes, was part of the Roman Empire from around the first to third century A.D.

A Roman road ran along the Neckar river and over the plateau. In Hechingen-Stein a Roman outpost along this road was discovered in the 1970s and has been turned into an outdoor museum. The limes actually cuts across the plateau at Aalen, which gets its name from the original Roman cavalry post, or ala, on the outskirts of the modern town. Here too, the Roman ruins are being excavated and a museum has been open to the public since the late 1980s.

=== Traditional life ===
Life was extremely hard in the Swabian Jura. The lack of water and the poor quality of the soil made it a backward region. For many villages fetching water required a long journey by horse. Since water often needed to be stored over a long time, it was often stagnant. Thus disinfection via alcohol was very popular: "Most" (cider) was mixed with water and even given to babies. A modern water supply system (outstanding for its time) was built in the late 1880s, which eased the situation.

=== Language ===
Locals in the areas speak the distinct German dialect known as Swabian German, which varies even throughout the Jura and is difficult to understand for speakers of Standard German. The dialect at the top of the plateau (German: Albschwäbisch) is markedly different from, and stronger than, even the broadest Swabian of the lowland areas. Across the whole Swabian region, many phrases and grammar are highly localized, even down to the village level; however, the Swabian dialect of the highland regions is characterised by a sing-song melody, and some of the verb forms are also distinct, not only from Standard German, but also from those of the rest of Swabia. In former times, Yiddish, Pleißne and Romani was also spoken. The Pleißne was spoken by hawkers selling items such as baskets, brushes, and whips, and belongs to Rotwelsch. It was used as a code.

=== Tradition ===
The "Swabian–Alemannic" carnival is an important tradition in many of the villages, called variously "Fastnacht", "Fasnacht", "Fasnet", or "Fasching". Of particular cultural importance is the Fasnet celebration in Rottweil. Typical of the Alemannic tradition are the witches and forest- or well-spirits, who typically signify Winter or the forces of nature coming to drive Winter out. The various roles are often claimed to have been defined in pre-Christian times and here the exact traditions vary from village to village, creating a fantastic variety of heroes, villains and good and evil creatures. It is also often the case that, while in one town a strong tradition of celebrating Fasnet has survived, the neighboring town will have almost no tradition. This is in many instances linked to the after-effects of the Protestant Reformation and the later influence of the Calvinistic Pietists, who more or less strictly opposed such frivolous - even heathen - behaviour. Catholic regions to this day tend to have a stronger Fasnet tradition. A Swabian Fasnet celebration in any case has little or nothing in common with the simultaneous celebrations along the Middle Rhein, which are well known across Germany because they are televised every year. Swabians generally are expected to go to work as normal on Rose Monday and Fat Tuesday, unlike their neighbors to the northwest.

== Industry ==
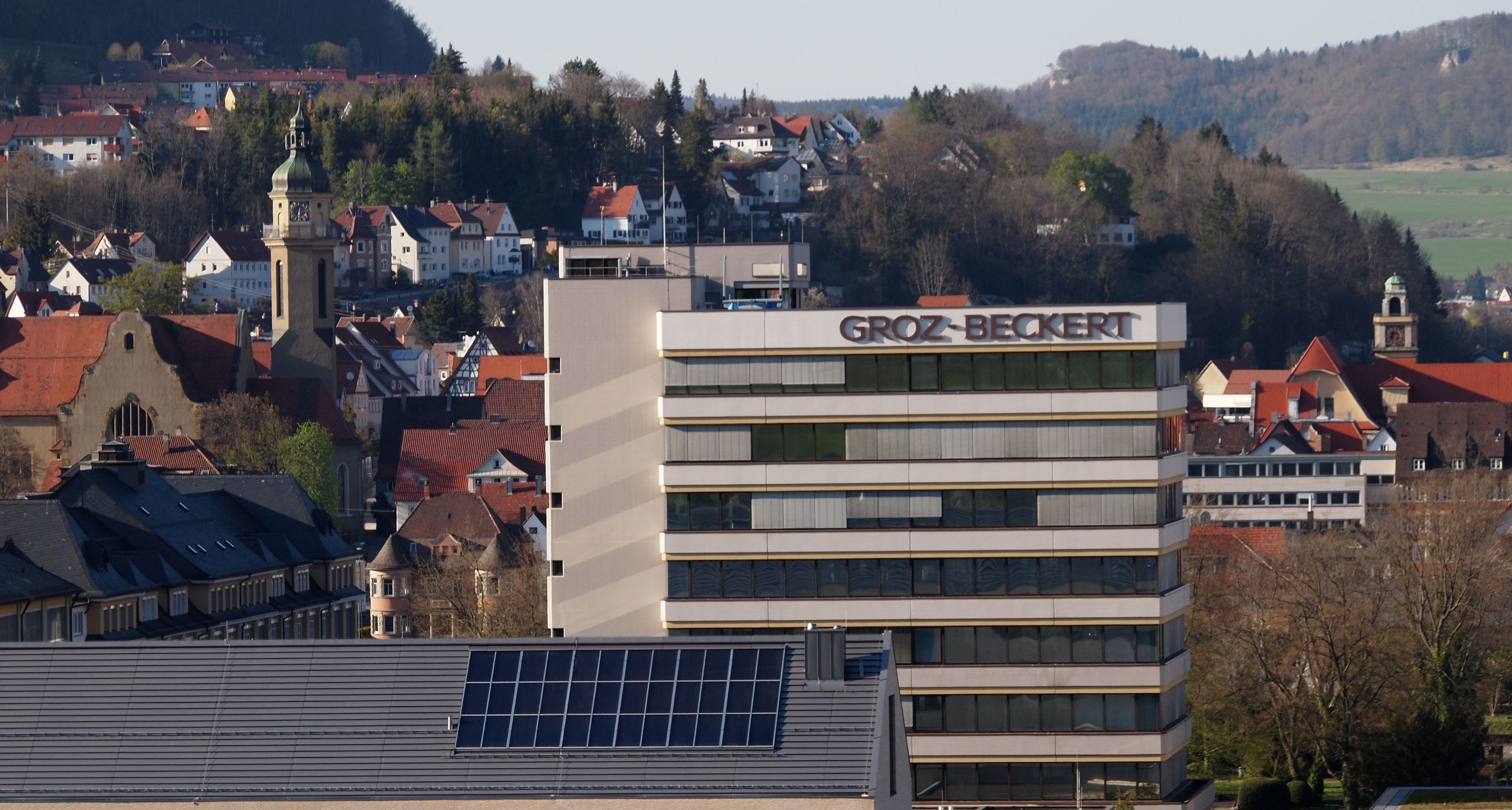
Groz-Beckert in Ebingen, world leader in needles for textile machines

Since raising crops was not easy, raising sheep was popular. This yielded the development of a strong textile industry. In the 1950s, Reutlingen was the German town with the highest number of millionaires, until the decline of the German textile industry hit them as well. Still, many high quality textile companies can be found, such as Hugo Boss, Merz b. Schwanen, Trigema, Reusch, Groz-Beckert and others (the town of Metzingen is widely known as a "luxury outlet town", with people from all over Europe coming to buy expensive clothes cheaper).

From this, machine building and advanced engineering developed. With the invention of cars and the founding of Daimler-Benz nearby, the car industry and later also electronics and computer industries developed. The "Neckar-Alb" region is the third largest industrial zone in Germany, and the most stable. The best known company is still Daimler-Benz, today known simply as Daimler AG, followed by Robert Bosch.

The region has one of the highest patents-to-population ratios in the world. Many products fall into the high-tech category. The small and medium enterprise sector (100-5,000 employees) predominates. Perhaps as a result, the unemployment rate is low. In general, products are expensive but compete through high quality. Several districts are recognised as especially attractive to business, e.g. Reutlingen as the town in Germany where it is simplest to open a new business. Educational resources are at a high level. The schools and universities of the region all enjoy top rankings within Germany. The Swabian Jura and the neighbouring region have developed from one of the poorest regions of Germany to one of its richest within the past 150 years.

== Climate ==
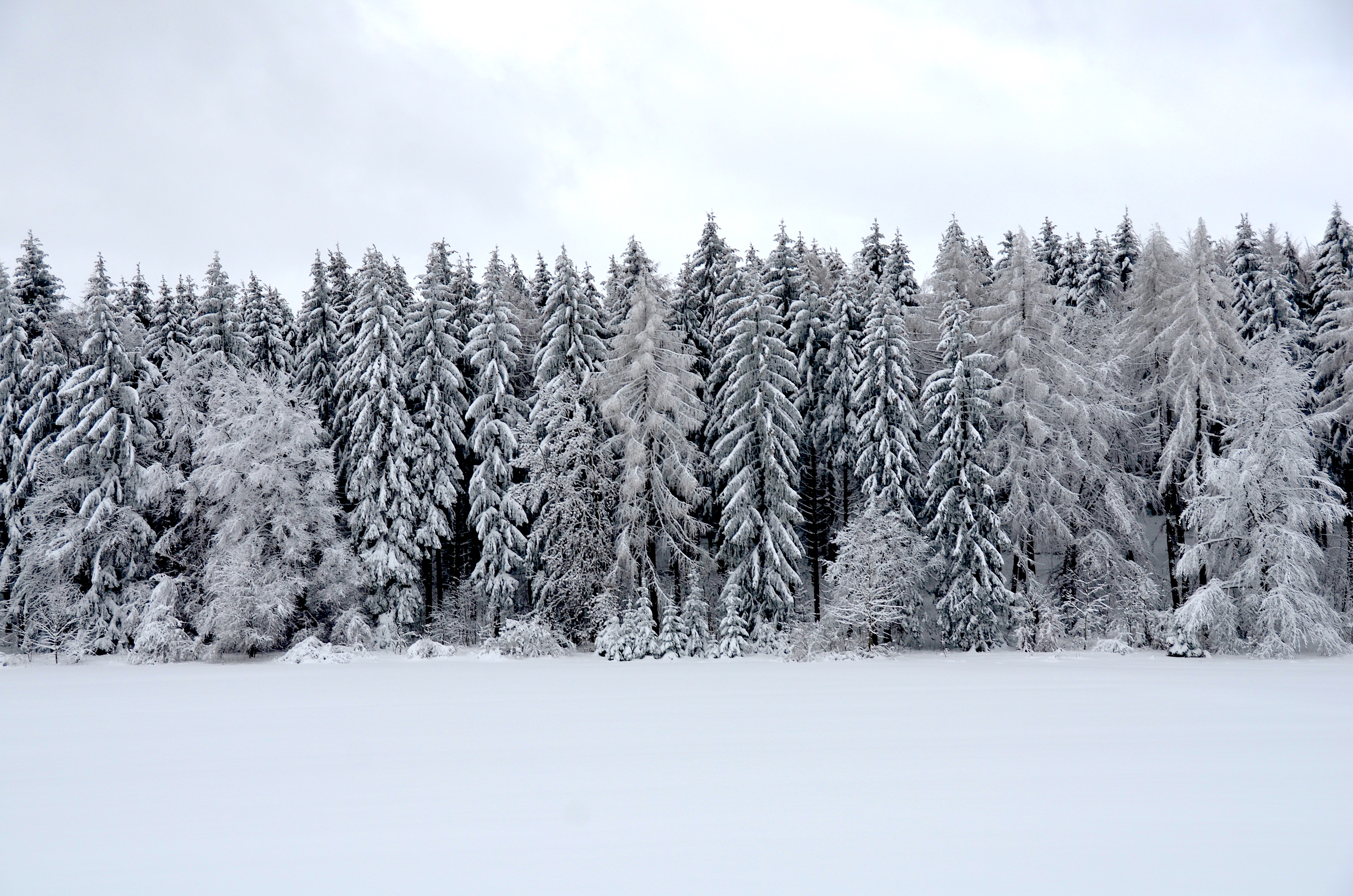
Snowy landscape on Swabian alps (2019)

In winter it often snows. Skiing is popular (though the hills are not steep or high) and numerous small resorts can be found. It is often windy and a bit colder than the rest of Germany. Because of a special micro climate, a small weather station near the town of Stetten am kalten Markt is known as the "coldest spot in Germany".

== Locations ==
The Swabian Jura is not densely populated by German standards. Most of the larger towns are outside the region, though they are often counted as part of it. These towns often have some of the highest rents in Germany, while land on the plateau itself is considered cheap (by south German standards). Many town names end in -ingen. There were several military training grounds, some also used by NATO troops. On the Münsingen training ground which existed for over 100 years, a biosphere reserve is in the making. The region has several larger and many small nature reserves.

=== Important towns ===
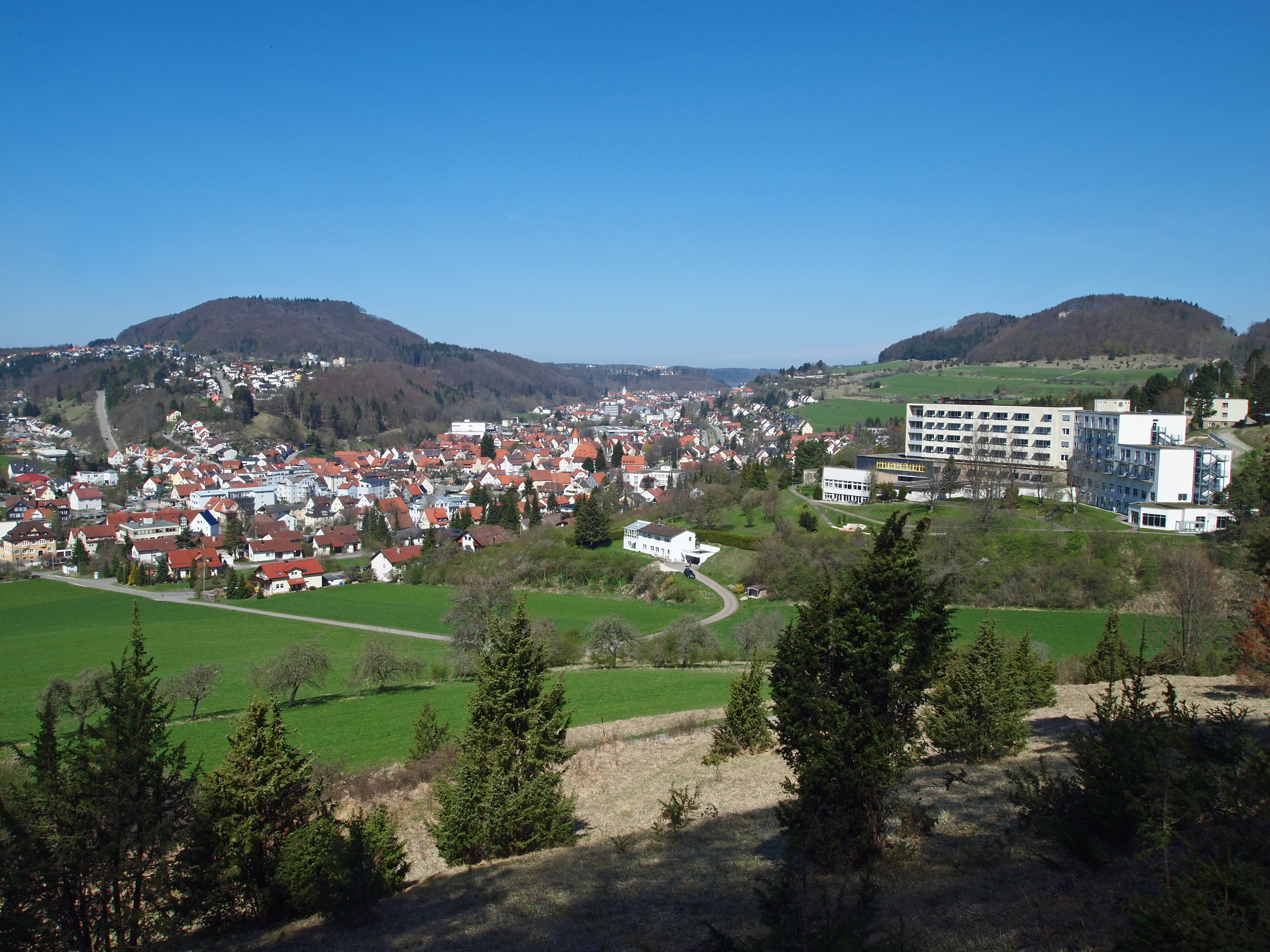
Albstadt-Truchtelfingen

On the plateau

- Engstingen
- Münsingen

In valleys

- Albstadt
- Gammertingen
- Heidenheim (north-eastern border)
- Sigmaringen

In the foreland

- Bad Urach
- Balingen
- Göppingen
- Hechingen (at the north-western escarpment)
- Reutlingen (called "The gate to the Swabian Jura")
- Rottweil (oldest town in Baden-Württemberg)
- Tübingen (University Town)
- Ulm (south-eastern border)

The towns in the foreland of the Swabian Jura officially don't belong to it.

=== Tourist locations ===
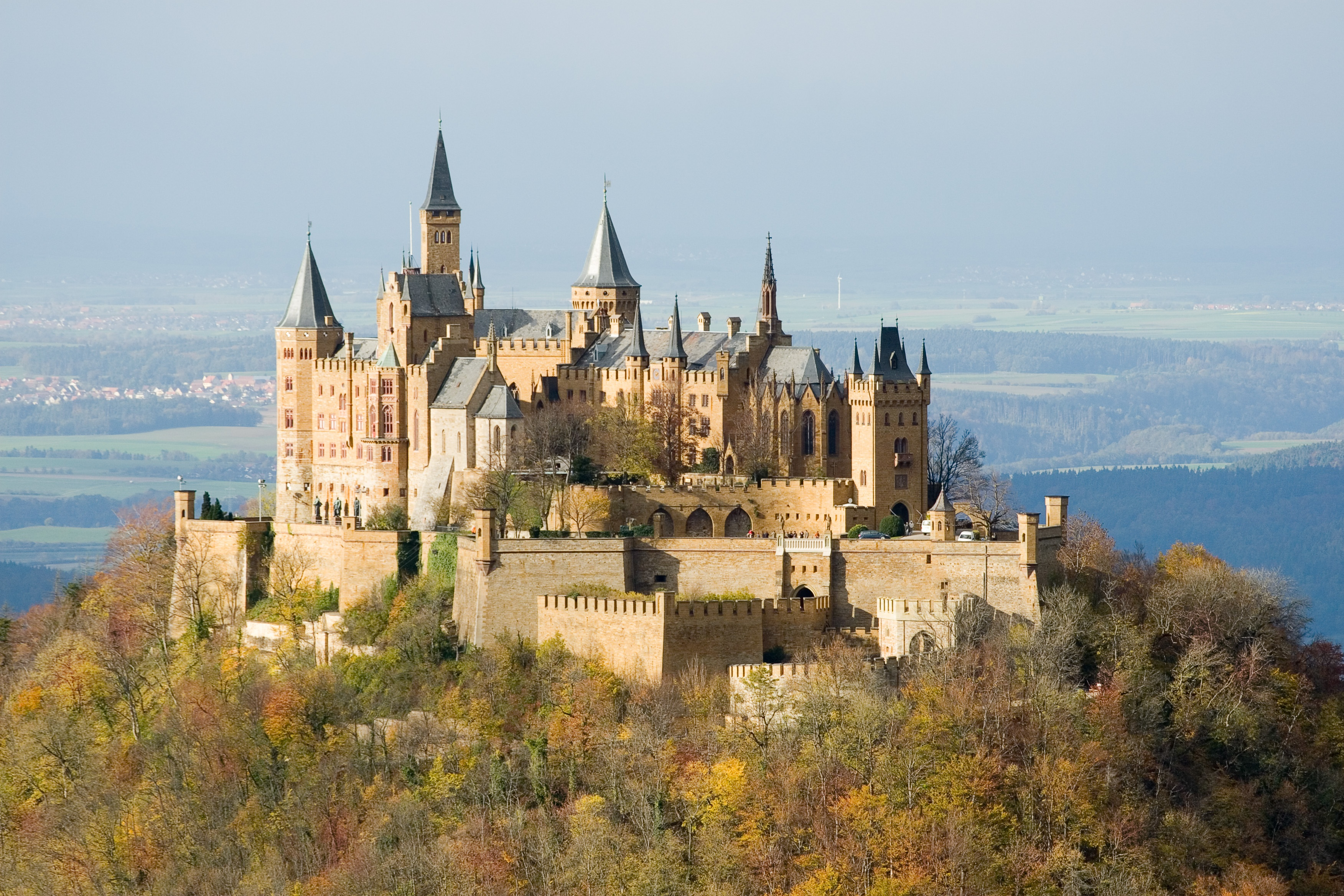
Burg Hohenzollern near Hechingen

There are many castles, monasteries, churches, ruins and old towns. Here is a small selection.

==== Castles ====
- Burg Hohenzollern
- Schloss Lichtenstein
- Schloss Sigmaringen
- Burg Hohenneuffen
- Hohenstaufen Castle (ruin)
- Schloss Hellenstein
- Burg Teck (ruin)
- Burg Hohenrechberg (ruin)

==== Churches and monasteries ====
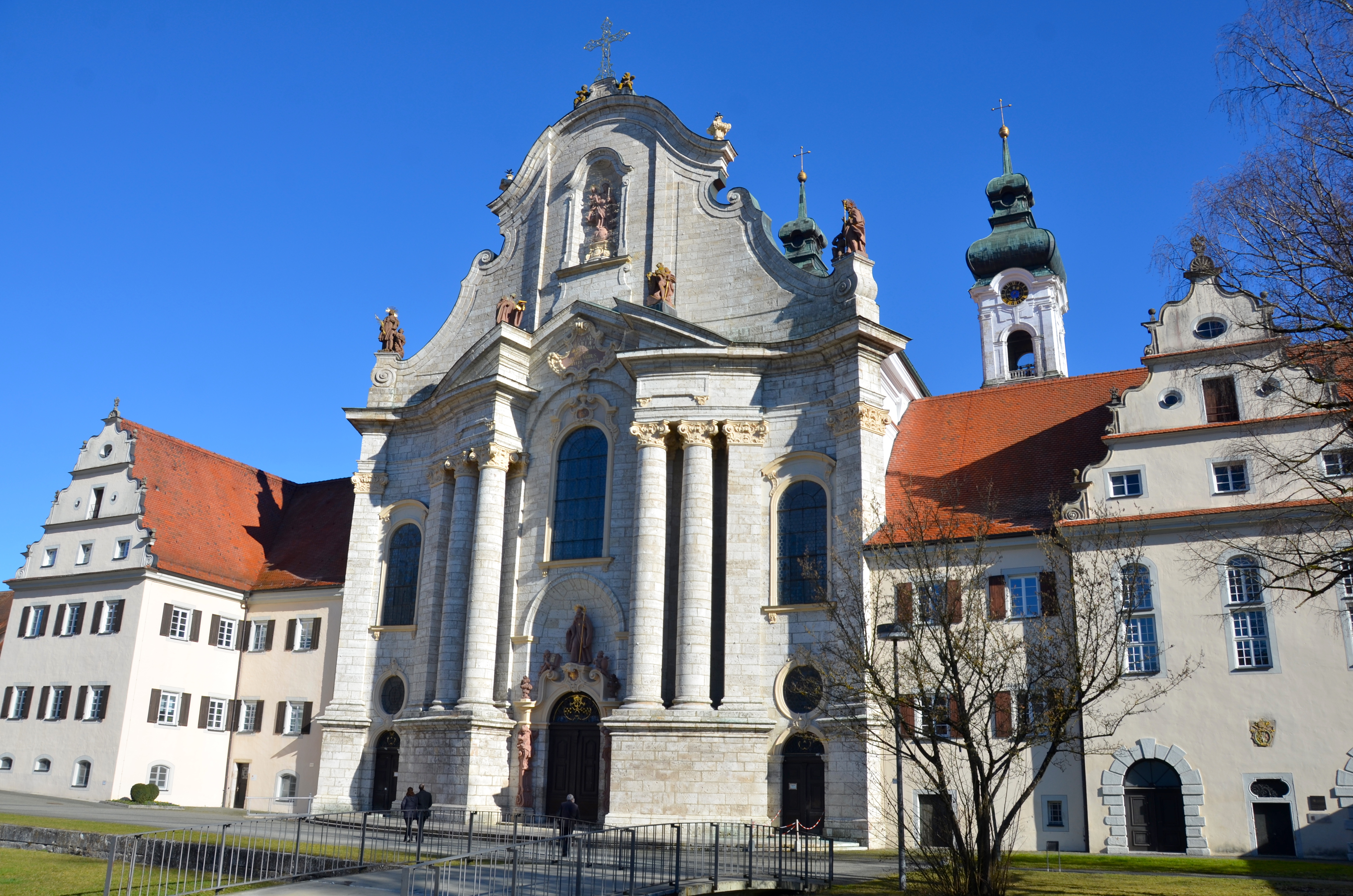
Minster of Our Lady Zwiefalten Abbey

- Zwiefalten Abbey
- Ulm minster church (highest church spire in the world)
- Beuron Abbey

==== Caves ====
- Nebelhöhle (mist cave)
- Bärenhöhle (bear cave)
- Blauhöhle

==== Towns ====
- Blaubeuren
- Tübingen
- Heidenheim
- Bad Urach

==== Other ====
- Blautopf
- Donauversickerung (Danube disappearing)
- Nusplingen (fossil hunting)
- Schäfbuch forest (48.3°N, 9.35°E)
- Wental, a recreational reserve near Bartholomä

A way for tourists to get to know the Swabian Jura is to travel on the Schwäbische Albstraße, a "National Scenic Byway", leading from Tuttlingen or Trossingen to Nördlingen or Aalen.

== Food and drink ==
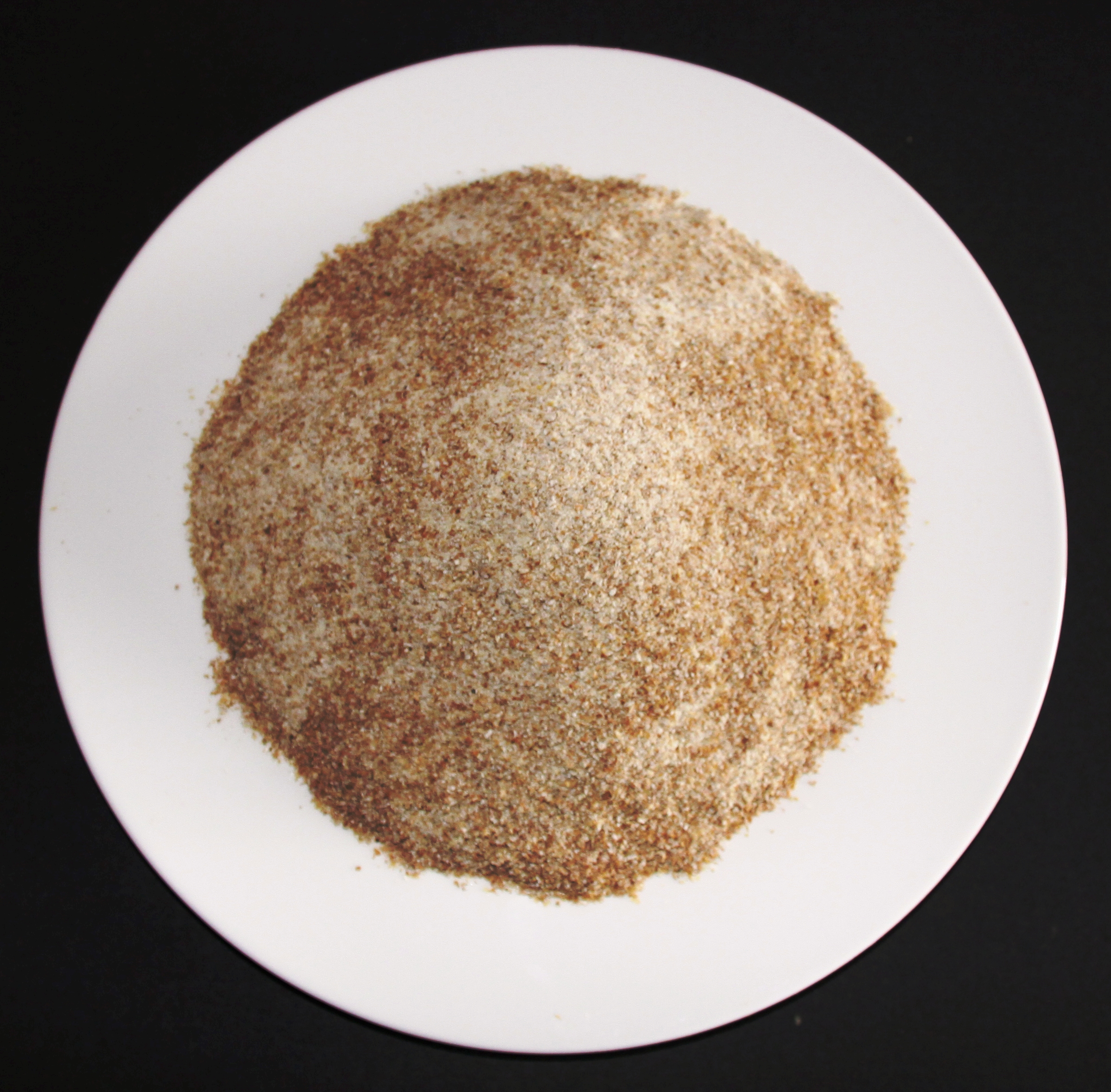
Musmehl, main ingredient of Brenntar

- Brenntar, was a Swabian staple foodstuff, particularly prominent in the Swabian Jura and in the Allgäu. It is made of a specially roasted flour called Musmehl.
- Alb-Leisa, traditional lentil varieties of this region.

== Note on terminology in English and German ==
The name German: Jura (related to Jurassic) derives from the Jura Mountains, of which the Swabian and Franconian plateaux are geographically part. In German, at least outside geological circles, the word Alb is used almost universally in place of Jura. The origin of the word is uncertain. One theory is that it derives form the Latin albus ("white"). Another is that it is from a pre-Indo-European word albhros ("hill"). It is related to the German words Alpe, Alm or Alp (from Old High German alpâ), meaning an "upland pasture". The word Alb functions as a proper noun referring more or less exclusively to the Swabian and the Franconian Jura (German: Fränkische Alb) areas however, and as such has no direct translation into most other languages. It is perhaps for this reason that Schwäbische Alb has sometimes been translated into English as 'Swabian Alps', thus avoiding the lesser-known name Jura. However, the area is not part of the Alps (despite its proximity), nor is it ever referred to as such in German, the Alps being die Alpen in German (plural).
