= Hochwald (Swabian Jura) =

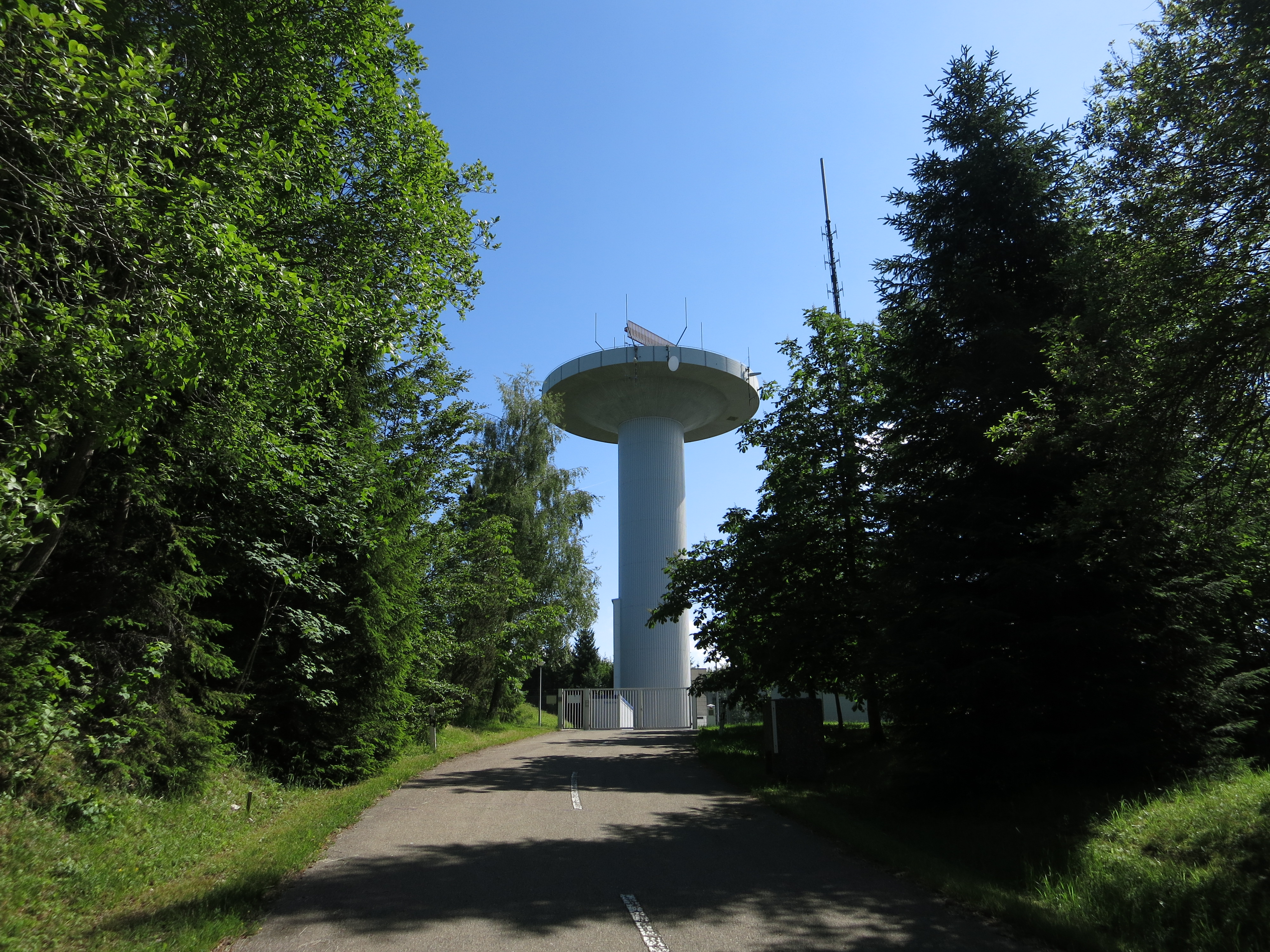
- On the Hochwald

Highest point
- Elevation: 1,002 m above sea level (NHN) (3,287 ft)
- Isolation: 2.59 km (1.61 mi) to Lemberg
- Coordinates: 48°07′58″N 8°46′32″E

Geography
- Location within Baden-Württemberg
- Location: Gosheim, Tuttlingen, Baden-Württemberg
- Parent range: Swabian Jura

The Hochwald (German pronunciation: [ˈhoːxˌvalt]) is a mountain of the Swabian Jura near Gosheim in the German county of Tuttlingen. It is part of the Region of the 10 Thousanders. The summit, which is not open to the public, has a radar site belonging to the German Flight Safety organisation.
