= Oberhohenberg =

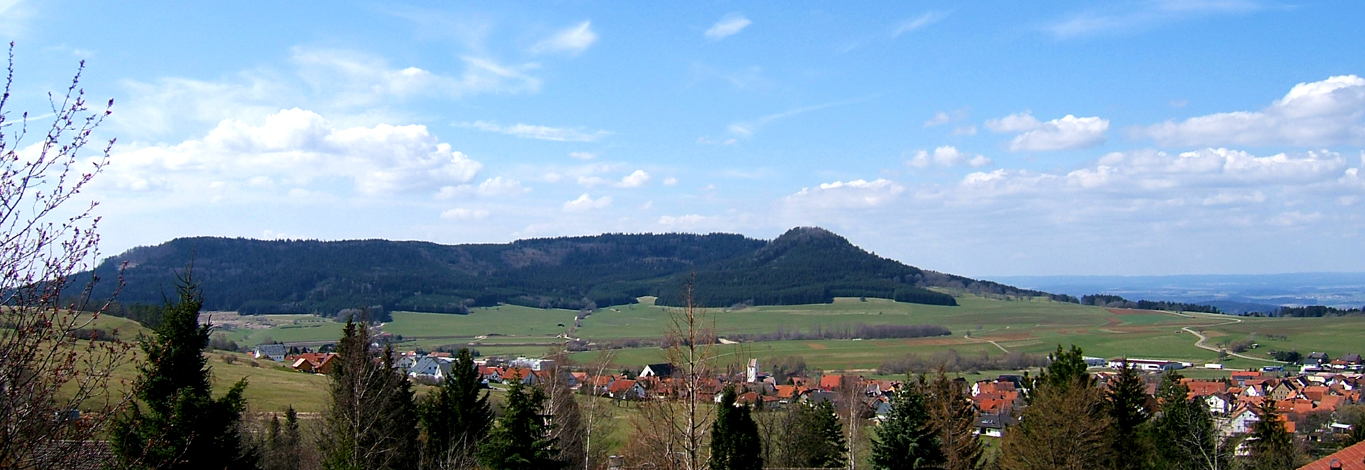
- View over the village of Deilingen to Oberhochberg (right) and Hochberg (left)

Highest point
- Elevation: 1,009.6 m (3,312 ft)
- Prominence: 84 m (276 ft)
- Parent peak: Lemberg (line parent)
- Isolation: 1.64 km (1.02 mi) to Lemberg
- Coordinates: 48°09′50″N 8°45′38″E

Geography
- Location within Baden-Württemberg
- Location: Baden-Württemberg, Germany
- Parent range: Swabian Alb

The Oberhohenberg (1,009.6 metres) is the second highest elevation of the Swabian Alb, only four metres lower than the Lemberg. It is one of the "ten thousanders."

The ruins on its top derive from the year 1449, when Oberhohenberg Castle together with the town of Hohenberg, at the foot of the hill, were destroyed in a local feud.
