= Hornau (Swabian Alb) =

Coordinates: 48°15′15″N 8°57′50″E

Hornau (Schwäbische Alb)

Geography
- Location: Zollernalbkreis, Baden-Württemberg, Germany

Hornau (Schwäbische Alb) is a mountain of Baden-Württemberg, Germany. It is located in Zollernalbkreis.
