= Lemberg (Swabian Jura) =

Mountain in Baden-Württemberg, Germany

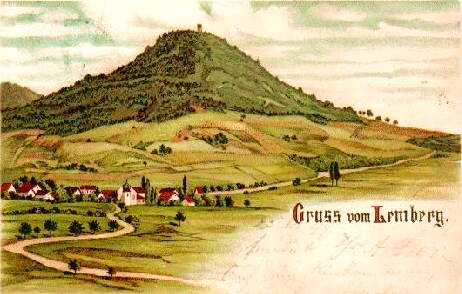
- 1899 picture ("Greetings from the Lemberg")

Highest point
- Elevation: 1,015.3 m (3,331 ft)
- Isolation: 35.53 km (22.08 mi) to Kesselberg
- Coordinates: 48°09′02″N 8°44′57″E

Geography
- Location within Baden-Württemberg
- Location: Baden-Württemberg, Germany
- Parent range: Swabian Alps

The Lemberg is a mountain located in the Tuttlingen district of Baden-Württemberg, Germany. The mountain is the highest point of the Swabian Jura (German: Schwäbische Alb).

It is one of the "Ten Thousanders"—ten 1,000-metre-high summits of the region. On the peak of the mountain is a 30-m-high tower which, rising above the surrounding trees, provides views of the Alps in clear weather.

== Prehistory ==
Like many of the mountains of the Swabian Alps, Lemberg is a "Zeugenberg"—a "witness mountain". A stratum of limestone has generally eroded away, leaving a few more-resistant remnants, such as the Lemberg.

The name is Celtic in origin. Those Celtic prefix "lem-" means something like morass or sump. Probably this name derives from the source of the Bära river, a tributary of the Danube, at the foot of the mountain.

From the 8th to 5th centuries B.C. there was a Hallstatt settlement on the Lemberg. Even today walls and ditches of a fortification can be detected on the summit. In the east and the west the summit plateau was terraced. Further remains of Celtic activity are also on the neighboring mountains, and the whole Heuberg region.

== Lemberg tower ==
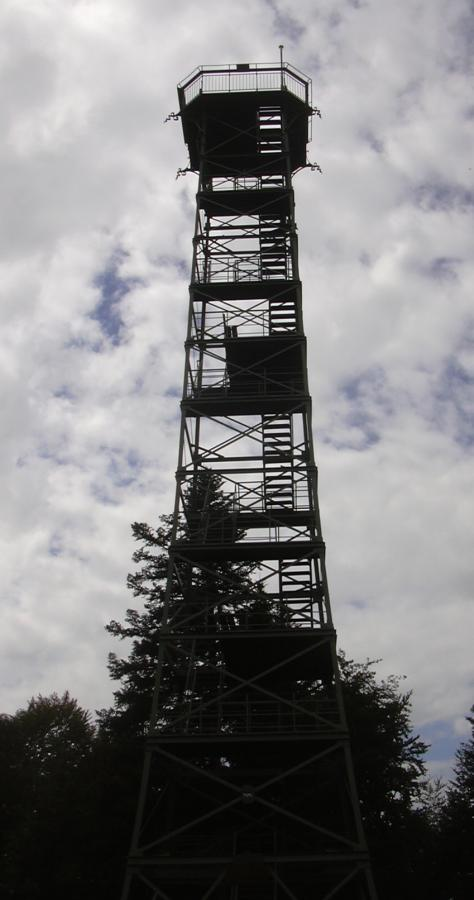
Lemberg observation tower

By 1890 there were plans for the building of a wooden tower on the Lemberg or its neighbour, the Oberhohenberg (1,011 m). The historical significance and the comfortable ascent argued in favor of the Oberhohenberg, however finally—particularly because of status as the highest mountain of the Swabian Alps—the decision was made to build on the Lemberg. In 1894 the first terrain inspection was made by one engineer and two master craftsmen. However construction was delayed, in particular because of scarce funds. In 1897 the original plans were dropped; a discussion over the building of a tower from stone or iron began. Since the cost of a stone tower was estimated at 24,000 marks, a substantially cheaper building of iron was chosen. A company from Freiburg was assigned. The funds came predominantly from donations.

The foundations were laid in Easter week, 1899. On Whit Monday, twelve workers began with the construction of the tower. Good weather favoured the work, so that on 17 June 1899 the building was already finished. The tower ascent has over 152 stairway steps, on twelve open floors. The tower consists of 23 tons of iron. The cost estimate of 10,000 Marks was not exceeded. The observation platform of Lemberg Tower is 30 metres above ground. With the flag pole on its top the tower is 34 metres tall.

Since then, the tower has undergone refurbishments about every 25 years. Particularly after the First World War, during which (as also in World War II) the tower had no military importance, one played with the idea to demolish the tower in order to save the money for renovation. The suggestion did not find however sufficient proponents. In 1973 and 1999 the tower was closed for longer periods, during which it was refurbished by volunteer craftsmen from Gosheim.

In the middle of the 1980s the former telecommunication office of Rottweil installed two directional antennas on the Lemberg Tower for the realization of a passive repeater microwave link between the communications building in Rottweil and the trunk exchange, situated on the Bahnhofstraße in Gosheim. This microwave link, which would not have been possible on a direct path, served to augment the existing terrestrial telephone lines. After these were replaced by fiber optic cables, the microwave link became obsolete and the antennas were dismantled in 2005.

Geographical coordinates of Lemberg tower: 48°9'3" N, 8°44'56" E

== Prospect ==
On clear days the view reaches to the south as far as the Alps, whose northern edge can be seen from the Zugspitze to the Bernese Alps. To the west lies the Black Forest, whose highest points are to be recognized: Feldberg in the southwest and Hornisgrinde in the northwest. At closer hand, the northwestern escarpment of the Swabian Alps (the Albtrauf) up to the Hohenzollern castle is to be seen, in the north the upper Neckar valley, the Schönbuch natural park, and in very good conditions even the Stuttgart TV tower, about 90 km away. Days with good viewing are more frequent in the autumn and winter than in the spring and summer.

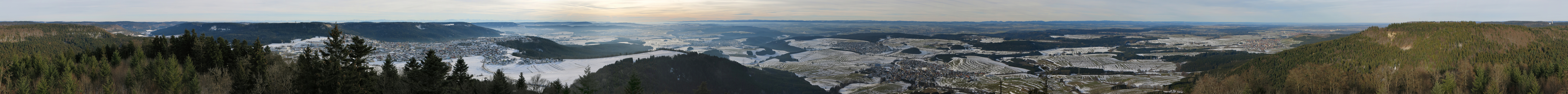
Panoramic view (360°) from the Lemberg tower with Alps and Black forest

== Hiking access ==
The Lemberg can be ascended on designated hiking trails. The Schwäbische Alb-Nordrand-Weg ("Swabian Alps northern edge way"), Hauptwanderweg 1 of the Swabian Alpine Club (Schwäbischen Albverein), crosses the summit. From the nearest parking lot, the summit can be attained in about three-quarters of an hour, gaining about 180 m in elevation.

From Wilflingen, the summit can be attained in approximately one and a half hours, climbing about 400 m. The trail crosses fields before entering the forest. The final climb of the trail is narrow and steep, gaining about 130 m.

== Summit shelter ==
The Albverein maintains a shelter hut on the summit of the Lemberg. The hut has a small restaurant with no fixed opening days, however a German flag is flown from the tower on days when the restaurant is open. The first shelter hut was inaugurated on 21 June 1901. It had an area of 6 × 3.5 m^{2} and was a log cabin construction made from round timbers on a concrete foundation. The construction cost amounted to 800 marks.

== See also ==
- List of mountains in Baden-Württemberg
