= Montschenloch (Swabian Jura) =

Mountain in Baden-Württemberg, Germany

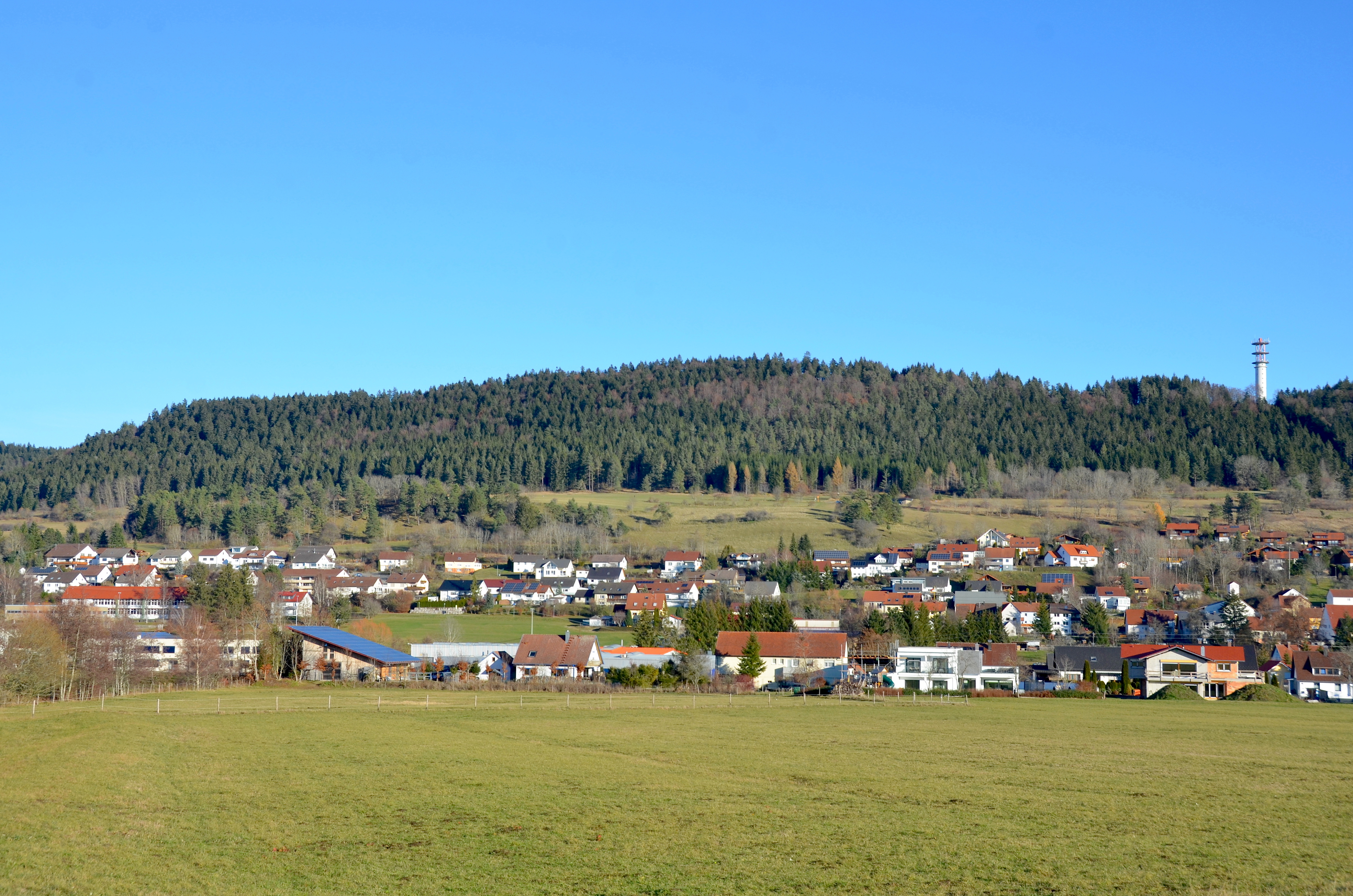
- View across Deilingen to the Montschenloch

Highest point
- Elevation: 1,004 m above sea level (NHN) (3,294 ft)
- Isolation: 1.07 km (0.66 mi) to Wandbühl
- Coordinates: 48°10.81′N 8°48.39′E

Geography
- Location within Baden-Württemberg
- Location: Deilingen, Tuttlingen, Baden-Württemberg
- Parent range: Swabian Jura

Geology
- Rock type: White Jura

The Montschenloch is a mountain, 1,004 m above sea level (NHN), and the sixth highest in the Swabian Jura in southern Germany. It lies about a kilometre east of Deilingen, forming a chain of mountains with the Rainen, Bol and Wandbühl. The Montschenloch belongs to the Region of the 10 Thousanders.
