= Charlotte Cave =

Cave in Baden-Württemberg, Germany

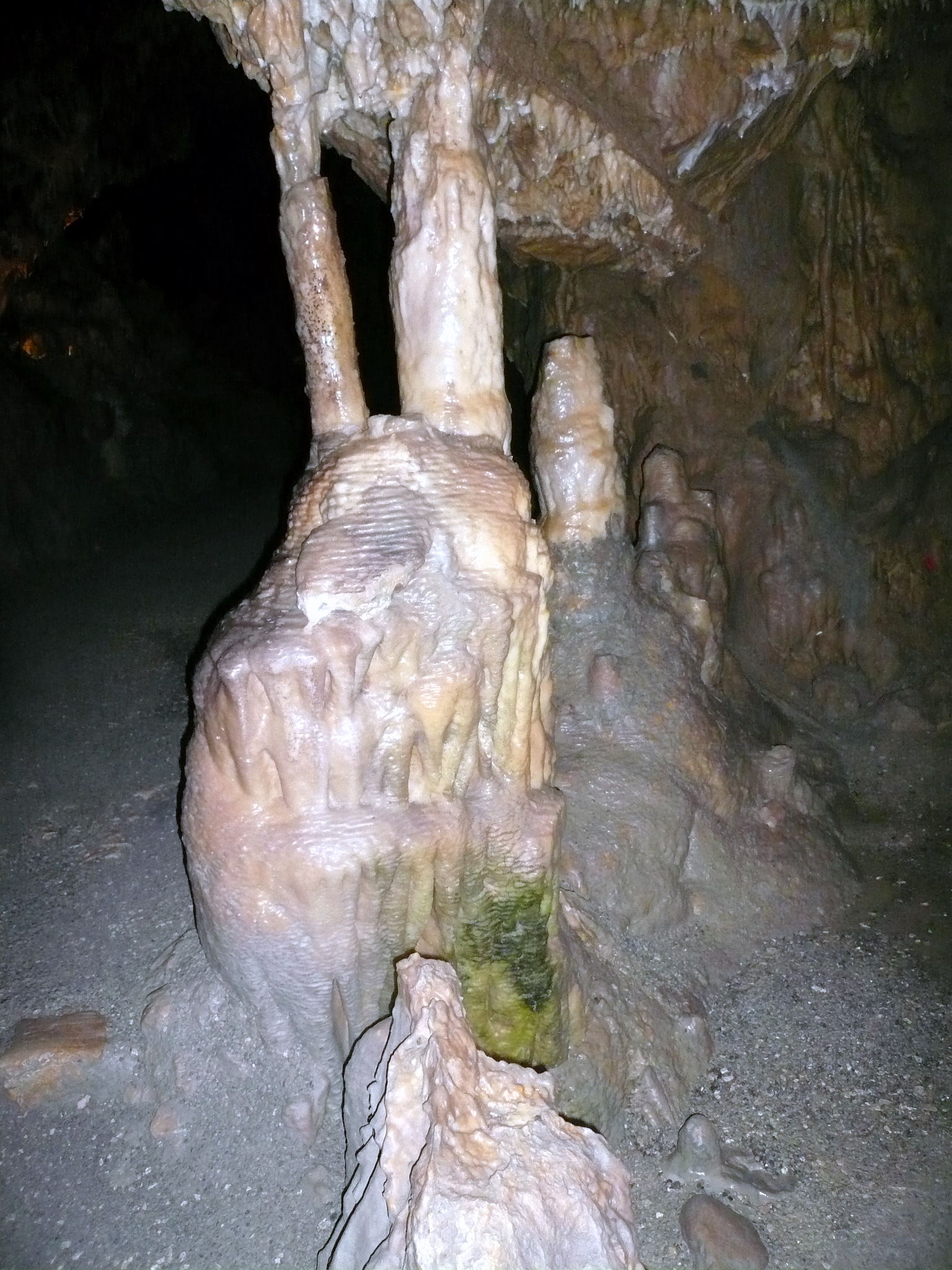
- Kapelle

- Location within Germany
- 48°35′0.8″N 10°12′28.6″E
- Location: Swabian Jura, Germany
- Country: Germany

Specifications
- Length: 532 metres (1,745 ft)
- Height: 487,51 metres

Charlotte Cave is a dripstone cave near Hürben, a district of Giengen, in the Swabian Jura in Baden-Württemberg. The cave is 587 meters long with side passages, lies 487.5 meters above sea level and is probably two and a half to three million years old. The Hundsloch, the entrance to the cave, was already recorded in a forest map in 1591. The population threw cadavers of domestic animals into this hole. The first excavation was made by head forester Hermann Emil Sihler in the spring of 1893 with a rope ladder. During further explorations and excavations, the cave was uncovered, opened to the public and equipped with electric lighting. The ceremonial opening took place on 17 September 1893. On 23 September Queen Charlotte of Schaumburg-Lippe visited the show cave named after her. This is used for tourism as a show cave over a length of 532 meters and is one of the information points of the UNESCO Swabian Jura Geopark, about 100 kilometers east of Stuttgart.

The relatively narrow cave passage, formed by flowing water, runs through the mountain like a tube and is interrupted by more than ten spacious, often quite high halls. The cave contains rich sintering with various dripstone forms. With its stalactite inventory, Charlotte Cave is considered one of the most beautiful show caves in Germany. In July 2005, the information center HöhlenHaus was built at the foot of Charlotte Cave. The HöhlenErlebnisWelt was built around the HöhlenHaus and a time travel trail was created at the entrance to Charlotte Cave. In July 2008, the HöhlenSchauLand, a multimedia museum, was opened in the immediate vicinity of the HöhlenHaus.

In recent years, the number of visitors has been maintained at 40,000 per year, bucking the trend of most other German show caves.

== History ==
=== Discovery ===
With the entry in the Giengen forest map of the Ulm city painter Philipp Renlin in 1591, the cave was mentioned for the first time and described as Hundsloch in the Hürbener open-field system Krauthalde. However, the exact location is missing. The name of the sinkhole with a diameter of about three meters is probably derived from the fact that the population probably threw cadavers of domestic animals into it since the Middle Ages. For this reason, the hole was not examined more closely by the locals for a long time. In 1893, the head forester of Giengen, Hermann Emil Sihler, was interested in exploring the hole for the first time. He was an experienced speleologist who had already dealt with the caves of the Swabian Alb and had discovered the Irpfel Cave near Giengen in 1892. The forest with the Hundsloch was in his territory. Sihler tried to enter the cave with a ladder in the spring of 1893, supported by the forester Gaiser and a day labor from Hürben. Since the ladder did not reach the bottom of the cave, the attempt failed.

A secretive excursion took place on Sunday 7 May 1893. Three inhabitants of the community of Hürben, the carpenters Friedrich Strauß, Jakob Beutler and Kaspar Schlumpberger, entered the cave with a 15-meter rope ladder. Friedrich Strauß jumped from the too short ladder onto a pile of bones. It was not possible to penetrate further parts of the cave, which could be recognized in an insinuating way. On 9 May another entry was made, this time with Sihler, with forester Gaiser belaying from above. In several hours, the roped men first removed the mountain of bones to such an extent that they could enter the cave proper. The first thing they discovered was a floor stalactite about two meters high, which was later called Berggeist. They advanced 163 meters to a narrow point in the treasure chamber. On the way, they discovered numerous stalactite formations. The excavation lasted about two hours. Under the direction of head forester Sihler, further cave explorations took place over the next few days, with the help of the Hürben fire department. The men were able to get an overview of the dimensions of the cave. The first reports about the discovered dripstone cave appeared in the Brenztal-Boten on 10 and 13 May. He wrote on 15 May 1893:

"With the help of the Hürben fire department, the cave was inspected in detail yesterday morning. The surprising result was that the cave has a length of about 500 meters (thus exceeds the Hohlenstein in extent) and that it extends in a westerly direction under the state forest Wasserhau towards Reuendorf, and is therefore not connected with the Kaltenburg. The cave consists partly of very spacious halls with magnificent stalactite formations and can be entered in an upright position with the exception of a short section. Besides the horse bones mentioned in No. 55, remains of the cave bear, cave hyena, and other predators were found yesterday. The cave should yield a nice haul with continued vigorous work. It is still unclear in what way of his time the horses, remains of which were found, got lost in the cave. Unfortunately, there is still no passable access to the cave, which can only be reached by means of a rope ladder, on which a distance of 16 meters has to be covered. A large company from Giengen arrived yesterday morning to visit the cave in Hürben." - Brenztal-Bote, 15 May 1893.

=== Development ===
By resolution of the Municipal Council of 16 May, walking in the cave was strictly prohibited, as stalactites had already been stolen. Furthermore, the future course of action was discussed. The cave was explored and made accessible along its entire length at the expense of the community with the support of the Oberamtsvorstand Filser from Heidenheim an der Brenz. The lower entrance to the cave was buried except for a narrow opening, which served as the lair of a fox. From the inside, the alluvial debris was removed, exposing the former outlet of the cave stream. Thus, the cave regained a ground-level access.

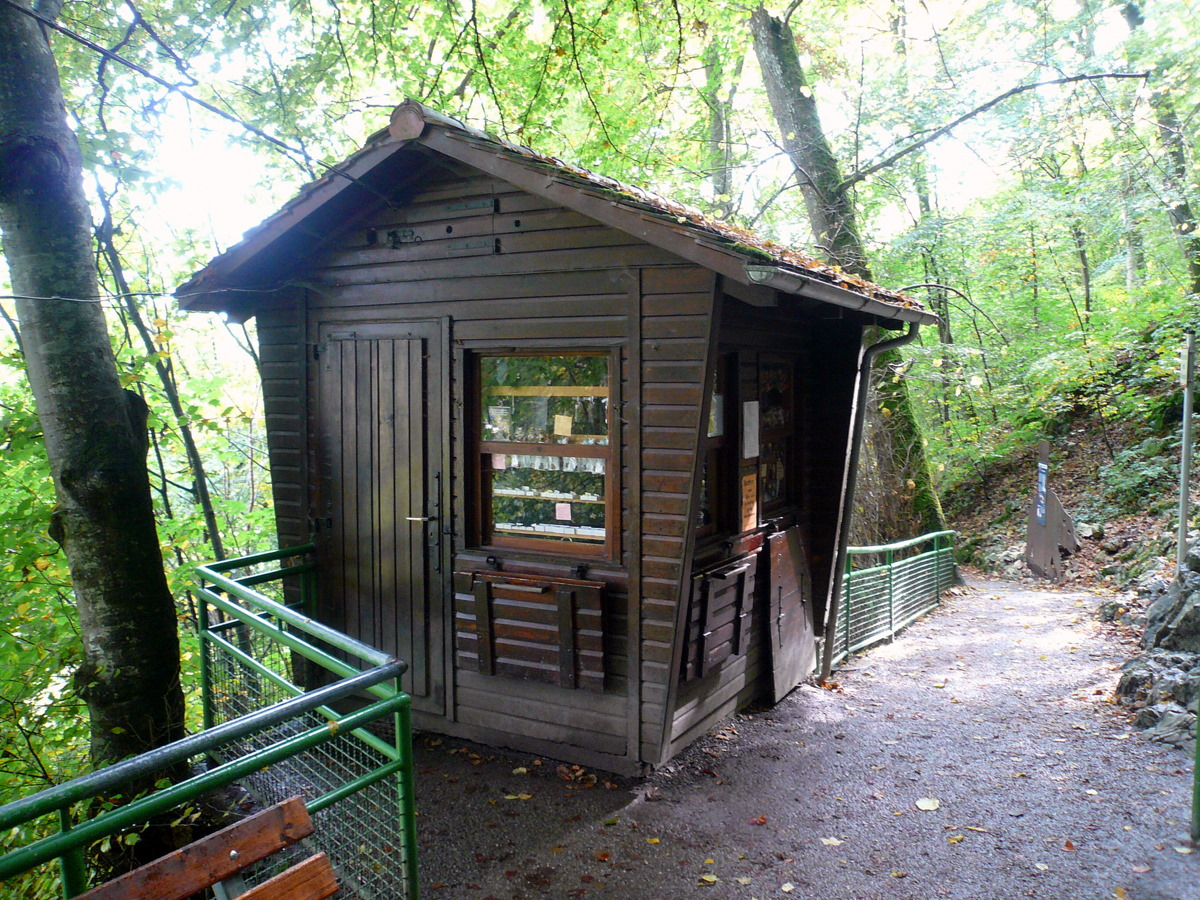
Cave kiosk

After the cave had been opened up to the back rooms, the geologist and paleontologist Eberhard Fraas from Stuttgart was able to examine it scientifically on 17 June with a group of other experts. Excavations also took place in the process. Fraas found numerous bones of ice-age animals, especially cave bears, but no prehistoric human traces. On the same day of the visit he certified "that the cave belongs to the most beautiful natural beauties of Württemberg and therefore a further opening of the cave is worthwhile in the highest degree." Furthermore, he declared: "A new natural beauty of the first rank has been opened up on our Alb and certainly no visitor will regret the walk through this magnificent cave." This encouraged the community to open the cave to the public. On 2 July 1893 the border messenger of the Amts- und Intelligenzblatt für den Oberamtsbezirk Heidenheim wrote that the cave "exceeds in extent and beauty of the stalactite formations all so far known caves of Württemberg and should probably form in a short time one of the most visited natural beauties of the area." Fraas also described his inspection of the cave there:

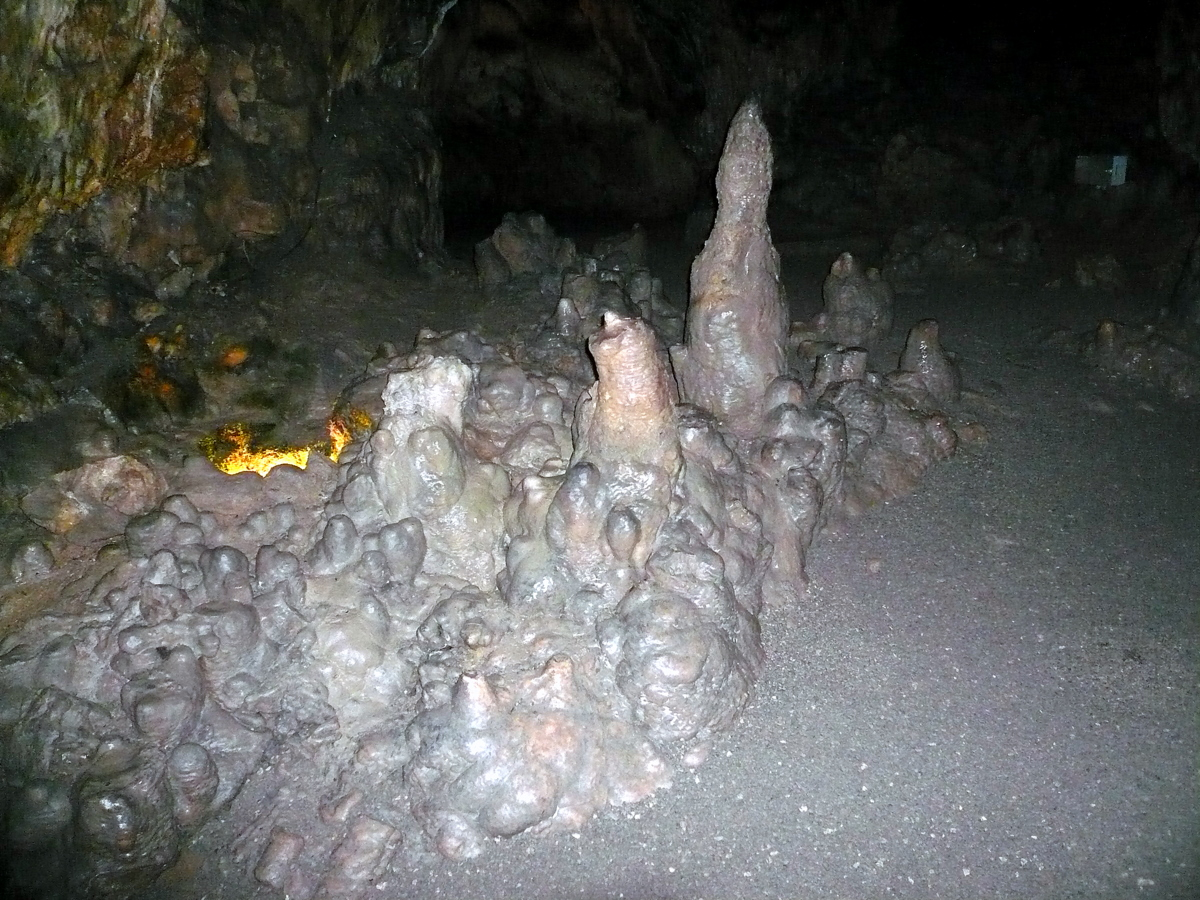
Soil dripstones

"We advance along the mostly flat and almost always dry path and reach the rear end of the cave, where the stalactites hanging down from the ceiling like a backdrop in connection with the stalagmites rising from the floor like giant asparaguses provide a magnificent sight. But how could all the beautiful and interesting things be described in words, which we encounter with every further step. Sometimes it is formal carpets with lace hanging from the walls, sometimes it is mighty columns and portals of honey-yellow, translucent calcite, sometimes it is dainty, glass-bright tubes that we admire and that inspire our imagination to the boldest comparisons. A seemingly never-ending labyrinth of narrow but high crevices and fissures, interrupted by wide halls, lets us advance further and further, and again and again new natural formations take hold of us." - Eberhard Fraas: Amts- und Intelligenzblatt für den Oberamtsbezirk Heidenheim, 2 July 1893.

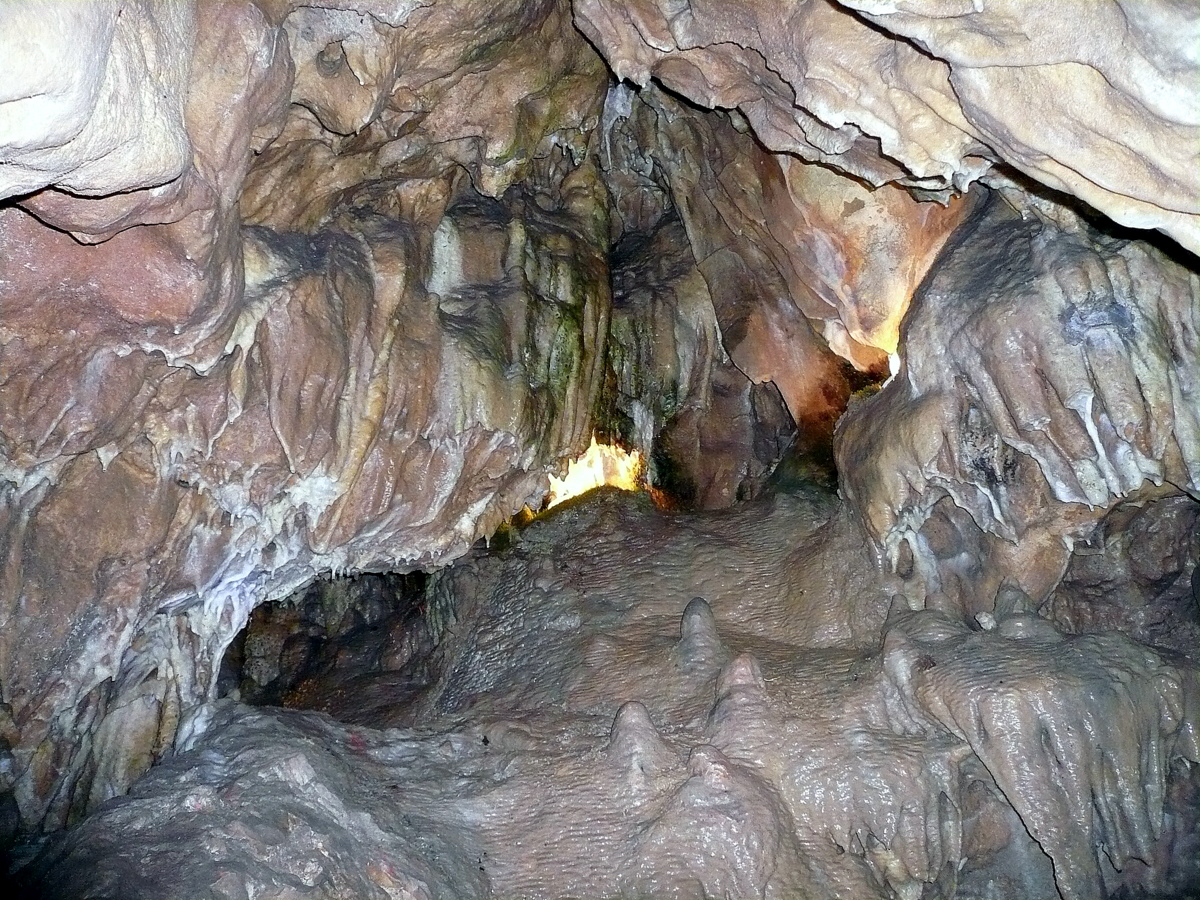
Sintered batches

The community asked Charlotte of Schaumburg-Lippe for permission to name the cave after her. It was probably hoped to receive a state grant for the development of the cave. Later, 1000 marks were promised. The wife of the last King of Württemberg, Wilhelm II, was invited to visit the cave. They began to completely expand the cave and make it accessible. At a narrow point in the cave, the present treasure chamber, 163 meters from the entrance, a breakthrough had to be made and a staircase built to bridge the difference in height to reach the cyclops vault. On the road below the cave, an inn was opened on 13 August in a wooden building 32 meters long.

=== Electric lighting ===
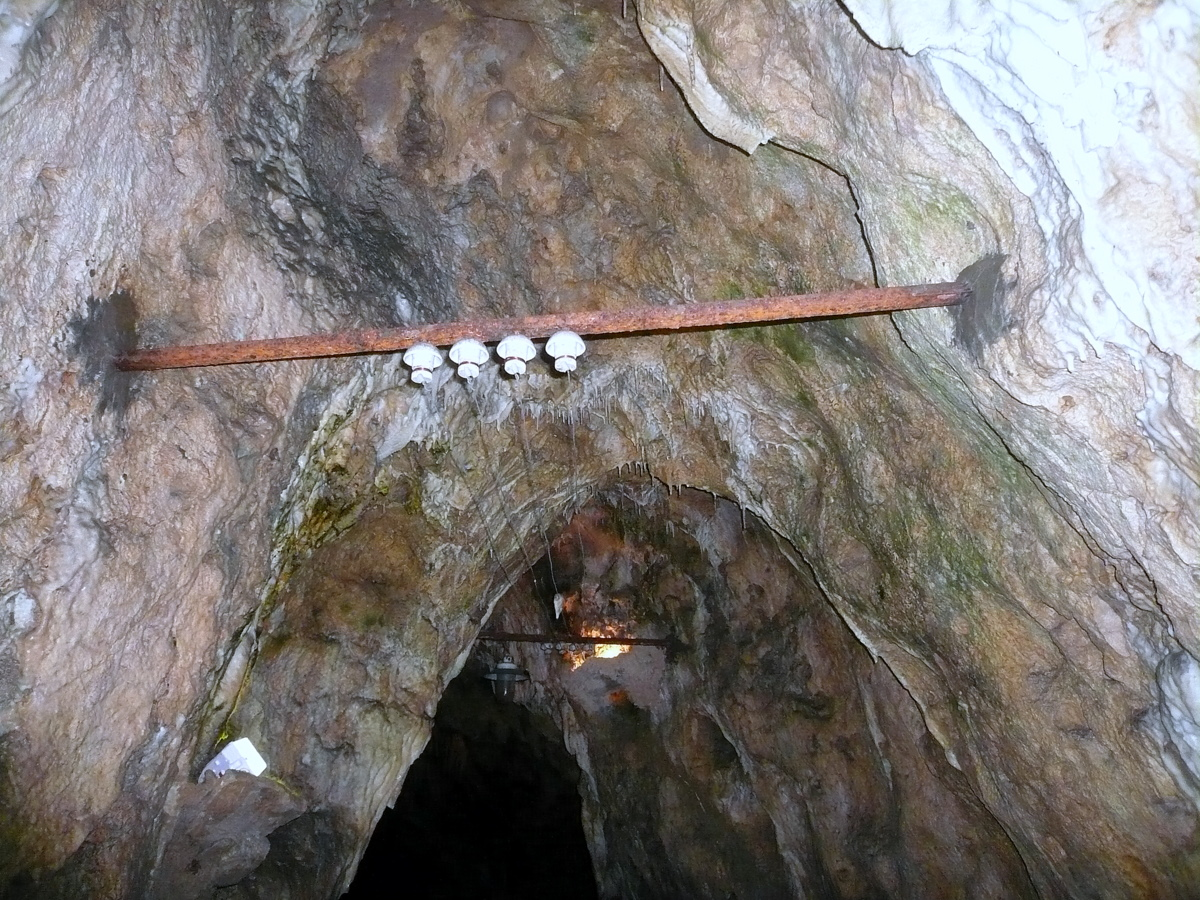
Power lines from 1893

The electrical lighting was installed by a pioneer of electrical engineering, Paul Reißer from Stuttgart, on the initiative of Oberamtmann Filser and Schultheiß Kost. He was given the task of installing the entire electrical system within 14 days so that it would be ready for the opening of the cave. Charlotte Cave is thus one of the first show caves in the world with electric lighting, after Kraus Cave in Styria, which in 1883 was the first cave in the world to be lit electrically. In Germany, the Olga Cave followed in 1884 and the Gußmann Cave in 1891.

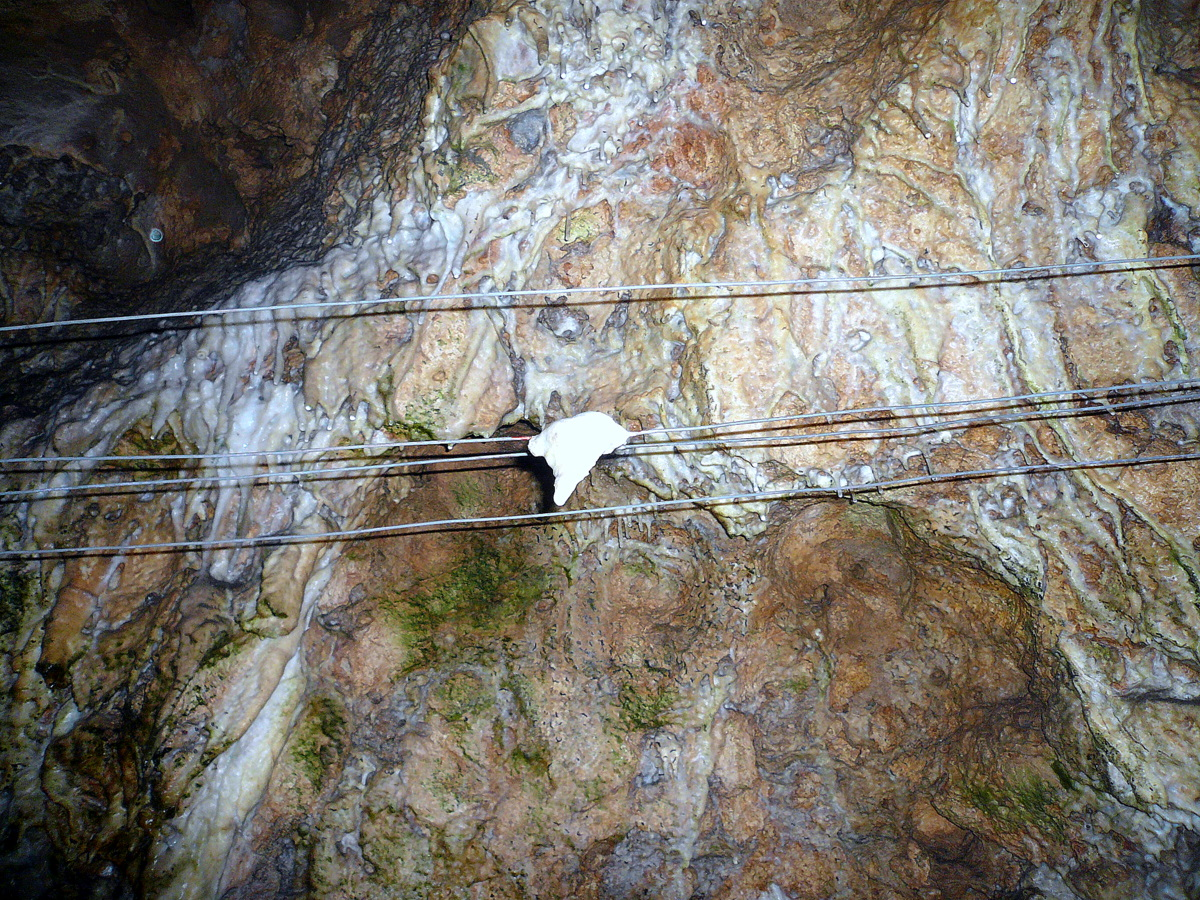
Dripstone on the power line

In the cave passage, cross braces were attached to the ceiling, to which the cables and lamps were fixed on glass insulators. There were 89 carbon-filament Edison lamps hanging from a 570-meter lead cable. Direct current of 105 volts was generated by an internal combustion engine driving a generator with shunt regulator. The cost of the cave lighting was 13,130 marks, financed by a loan from the municipality.

In August 2011, the lighting of the cave was completely converted to LED technology in three months of work, whereby spotlights were used to illuminate specific sections of the inner wall instead of the entire cave. The old power lines were largely dismantled in the process. One section, where dripstones had formed on the wires, was left as an attraction.

=== Opening ===
The official opening of the cave, which was already known far beyond the borders of the municipality due to the newspaper reports, took place on 17 September 1893. Even before that, 500 to 1000 people who came on foot or by wagon had visited it on Sundays. Cave guides were hired and entrance fees were set. Numerous onlookers came to the inauguration with horse-drawn carriages and ladder wagons. A procession was accompanied by the Heidenheim town band. In his welcoming speech, Schultheiss Kost thanked Fraas for his scientific exploration of the cave. The ceremonial address was given by Oberamtmann Filser, the chairman of the cave committee, and he ceremoniously presented the cave key to the first cave guide, Beutler. As a result, the cave was opened to the public. The promised visit of the queen was made up for on 23 September 1893. By the end of the year, about 15,000 people had visited the cave. Admission was one mark for adults, which at the time was equivalent to three to four times the average hourly wage of a worker.

=== Queen Charlotte ===
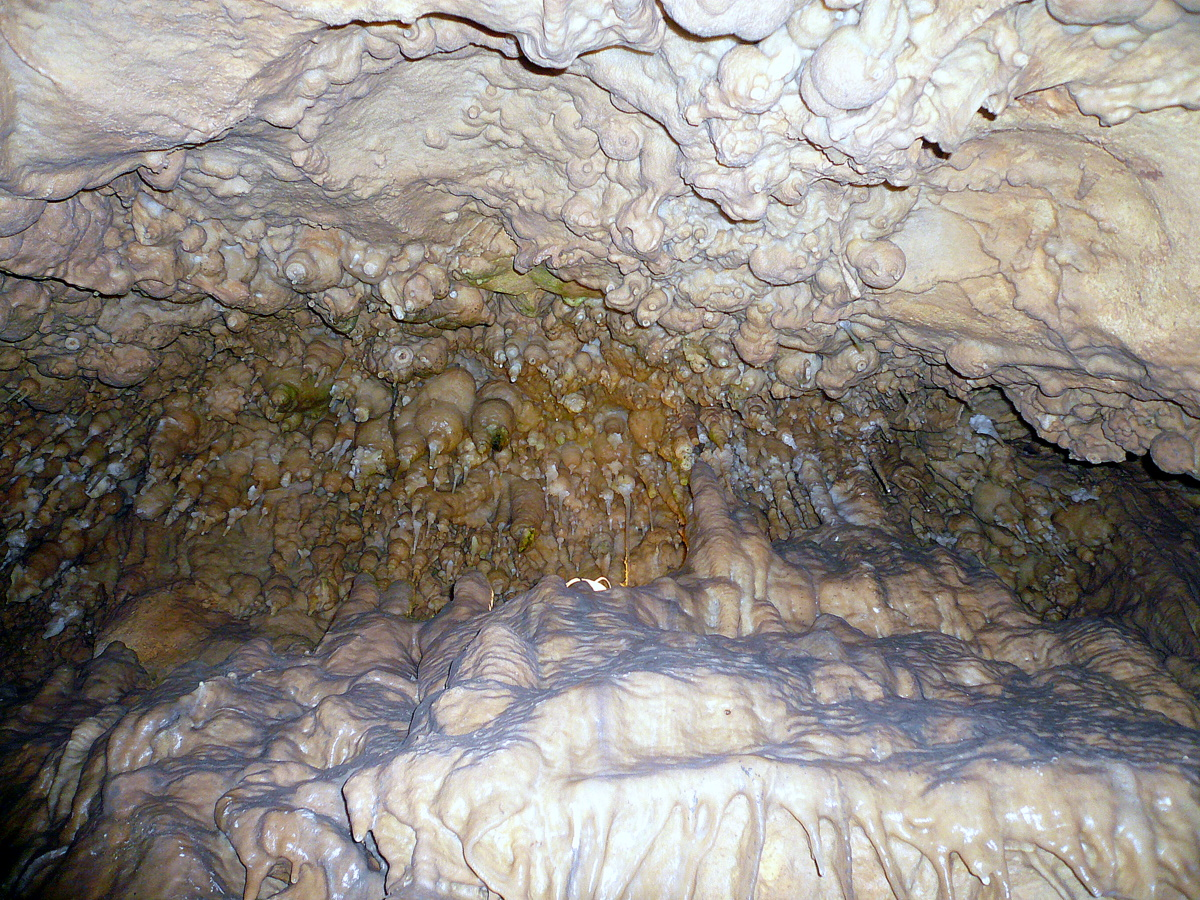
Ceiling drops

The queen combined her visit on Saturday 23 September 1893 with a visitation of social institutions in the city and district of Heidenheim. She traveled to Heidenheim on a special train and drove through the city in an open court carriage in pouring rain, where the densely packed public lined the decorated streets. At 3:15 p.m. the queen arrived at Hürben, which was garlanded and decorated with flags, to the ringing of bells. In addition to the queen's entourage, all district and municipal officials and boroughs had turned up to receive her. Since the road to the cave was soaked by the heavy rain, it was covered with linen over a length of several hundred meters. The queen was visibly surprised and impressed by the beauty of the cave, which had been illuminated with another 149 lamps, including 39 colored ones. She was led to the center of the cave, the King's Hall, by Fraas. Up to there the electric lighting reached. Then they went deeper into the unlit cave areas by candlelight until they reached the Kristall Cave. After half an hour, the queen left the cave and went to the new inn. At about 4:30 p.m., she drove first to the children's rescue center in Herbrechtingen and later to the train station, from where a special train with her entourage brought her back to the residence. The cost of the visit and the inauguration festivities amounted to 2000 marks.

=== Show cave ===
When the initial enthusiasm for the cave waned and the number of visitors decreased, the income was no longer sufficient to cover the expenses, especially the high electricity costs. Graduate engineer Carl Gaulé from Stuttgart was asked to clarify whether more cost-effective lighting was possible. In his report of 23 November 1902, he weighed up the advantages and disadvantages of torches, magnesium flares, acetylene gas systems, acetylene gas hand lamps and electric lighting and came to the conclusion that the latter was the most practical type of lighting. On 3 June 1903 a fire occurred in the engine house, destroying the engine, dynamo, and other accessories.

The municipal administration then decided to lease the cave to the innkeeper Friedrich Föll from Herbrechtingen for 30 years from 3 August 1905. There was still a residual loan of 5650 marks from the development period of the cave, which the leaseholder had to take over. In return, he received the insurance sum from the engine house fire in the amount of 7568 marks. With this money he purchased a new engine and dynamo in 1906. In 1934, the lease was not renewed and the cave became the responsibility of the local government again as of 1 April 1935.

In 1957, on the initiative of the mayor Ernst Bosch, work began on renewing the lighting in the cave. In the process, the light sources were relocated in such a way that they could no longer be seen and specifically illuminated the stalactites. By 1965, 203 lamps and two floodlights had been installed. In the winter of 1976/1977, the electrical installation was brought up to the latest safety standards. The dripstone cave has been part of the UNESCO Swabian Alb Geopark since 2004. In August 2005, the information center HöhlenHaus of the Hürben Cave and Heritage Society was inaugurated at the foot of the cave. The HöhlenHaus is one of 26 information centers of the Swabian Alb Geopark.

The HöhlenErlebnisWelt was created around the cave center with a time travel trail at the entrance to Charlotte Cave. In the immediate vicinity of the HöhlenHaus, the HöhlenSchauLand, a multimedia museum, has been in existence since July 2008. The costs of both facilities, including the design of the outdoor area, amounted to about 1.8 million euros, with the European Union (EU) and the state of Baden-Württemberg together contributing 1.2 million euros.

From April to August 2011, the complete lighting system of the cave was replaced by LED lighting. For this purpose, several hundred new lamps were installed on the initiative of the city of Giengen and the Giengen-Hürben Cave and Heritage Society. The project was supported by the LEADER funding program of the European Union.

== Geology ==
=== Origin ===
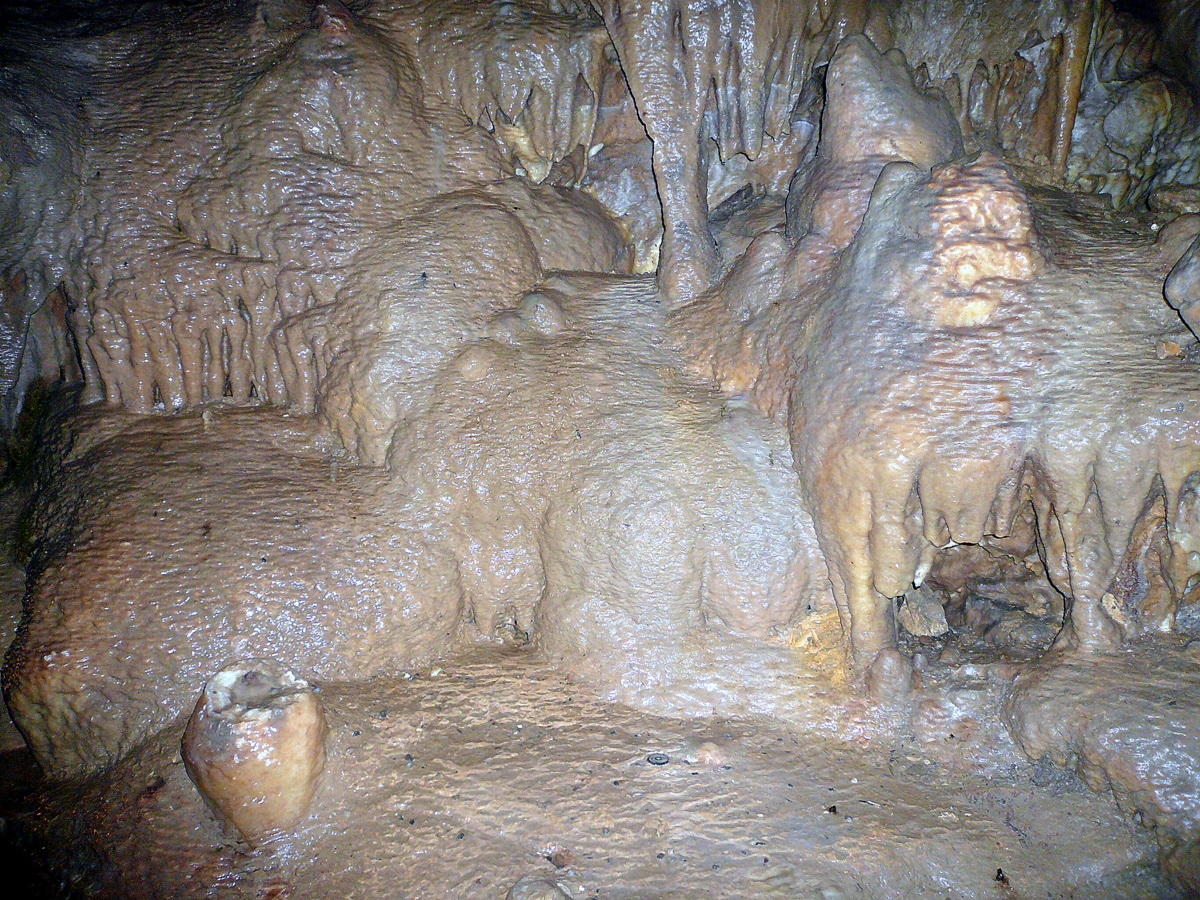
Wall sintering

The age of the cave is about two and a half to three million years. It was formed in the White Jurassic in a karst landscape. Initially, a cavity formed in the stagnant groundwater, which had penetrated as lime-saturated seepage water from the crest along the layer joints and fissures. After the deepening of the Brenz River, which at that time flowed through what is now the Hürbe Valley, the water drained away. The Swabian Alb was raised at the end of the Tertiary in the transition to the Quaternary, the Brenz deepened and adapted to the new gradient. It was deprived of water in the karst landscape and a dry valley formed. Later, the Hürbe flowed in this valley. The former cave river cut deeper and deeper into the original tube and widened the cave. The deepening of the former Brenz valley lowered the karst water level. The higher drainage systems were no longer involved in the drainage. The environment of the cave changed as a result. Water had left the passage system and now drained above ground into the deeper Brenz Valley. The valley through which the Hürbe River now flows is about 35 meters lower. The watercourse in the cave eventually fell dry. The juxtaposition of rooms with chimneys, the hall-like extensions in the lower part of the cave and the narrow connecting passages with water level marks are also indications of the river cave stage. When the washed out rock broke from the cave ceiling, halls of entrapment were formed. Stalactites developed in places on the rock masses on the cave floor. Charlotte Cave is one of the rare examples of a river cave. Comparable show caves are the Eberstadt Stalactite Cave and the Bing Cave.

=== Cave data ===
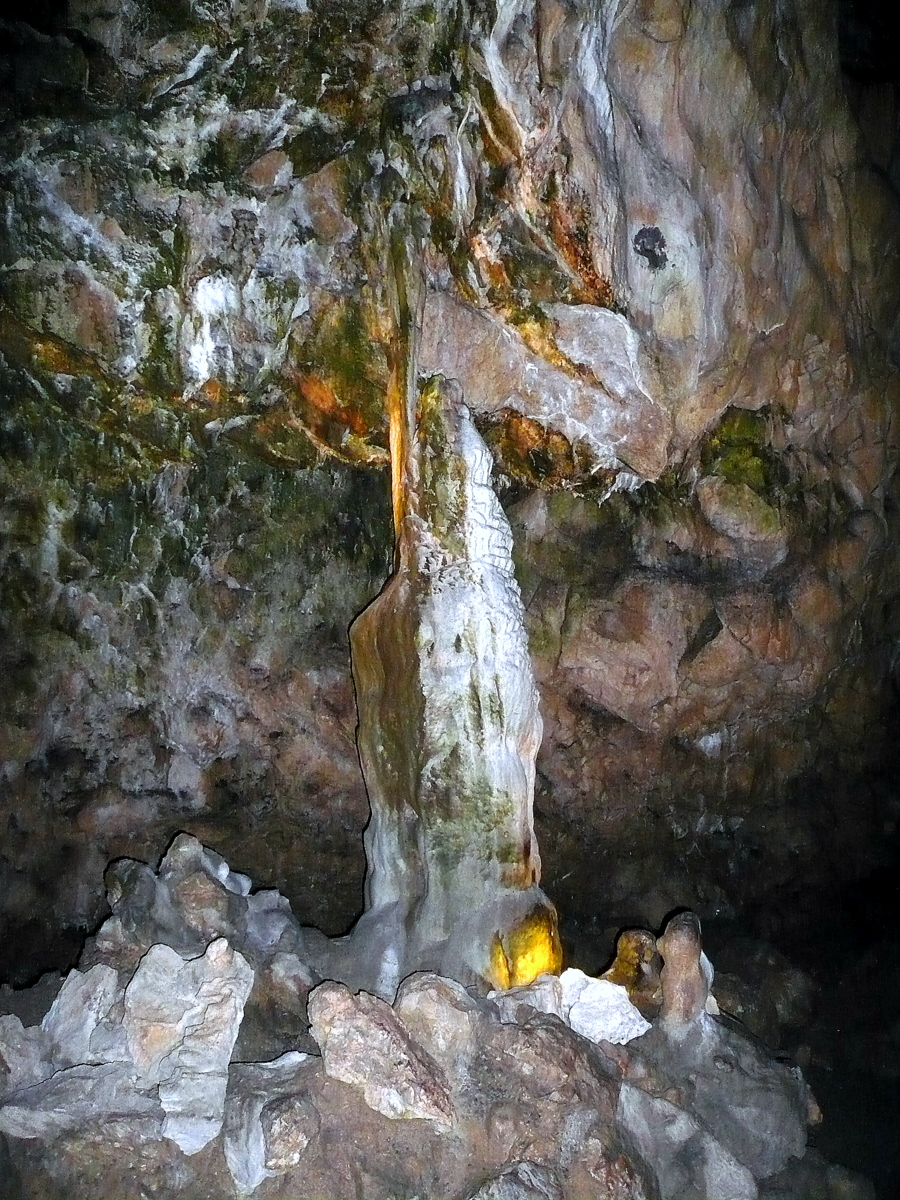
Berggeist in the Sihlerhalle

The cave in the dolomitic White Jurassic Zeta (Tithon) consists of a narrow tube-like cave passage interrupted by more than ten spacious halls, often quite high. The passage formed by flowing water is often keyhole-shaped. The cave has two fissure directions; one runs from east to west, the other from northeast to southwest. The abrupt change of direction can be observed in many places inside the cave. The fissures are also almost always visible on the ceiling. The water level marks, typical of river caves, reveal the eroded sections (erosion boundaries) in the limestone and the frequently changing water level. The cave with a gorge-like profile has a slope of about ten meters from the end of the cave to the entrance, on average about two percent. The floor slopes according to the slope. The cave entrance is at 487.5 meters above sea level. At the last measuring point just before the end of the cave, the floor has an elevation of 495.6 meters above sea level, and 500.1 meters above sea level in the constricted area at the end of the cave. The Hürbetal valley is 452.7 meters above sea level. The total length of the cave is 587 meters. This includes an approximately 50-meter-long, non-accessible passage, which is accessible via an eight-meter-high shaft. Excluding this side passage, the cave is 532 meters long. The cave averages 25 to 30 meters below the earth's surface.

=== Dripstones ===
The Charlotte Cave has rich sintering, with all possible forms of dripstones. The first third is poor in dripstones, further back the passage and halls are more richly endowed. This may be related to the fissure crossings, which are more common further back. In the cave there are stalactites, stalagmites and stalagnates of various sizes and shapes. There are spherical, rod-shaped, fringe-shaped, tube-shaped and veil-shaped stalactite formations. In some places in the cave, there are excentriques, sideways or upward curved outgrowths a few centimeters long, independent of gravity. In the entrance area of the cave, there are few dripstones, but moonmilk excretions of white rough limestone. Towards the end of the cave, the sinterings become richer and richer, there are mainly large floor stalactites (stalagmites). A special feature are turnipy and radish shaped large cap dripstones. Round pearl sinter is also present there. The alternation between dripstone and perlsinter growth could be the cause of the round stalactites. Due to the closure of the cave in the glacial climate, corrosion of older dripstone sections occurred due to mixing of seepage water with carbon dioxide-enriched cave air.

=== Guideway ===
Cave map

All room extensions bear names for better distinction. Some were named after historical figures. The majority of the distinctive stalactite forms also have names, with most being named for their similarity to specific objects. On a still existing section of the original pipe section from 1893, a dripstone of about seven centimeters in size has formed over the last hundred years, growing both upward and downward. Its relatively rapid growth is due to a humus-filled sinkhole at the earth's surface. The humic acids lead to an increased dissolution of lime. In various places, so-called bear cut with smoothly polished wall sections can be seen. There the bears had tried to remove dried mud and itchy vermin from the fur. The smoothing resulted from the rubbing of the quartz portions of the clay against the wall.

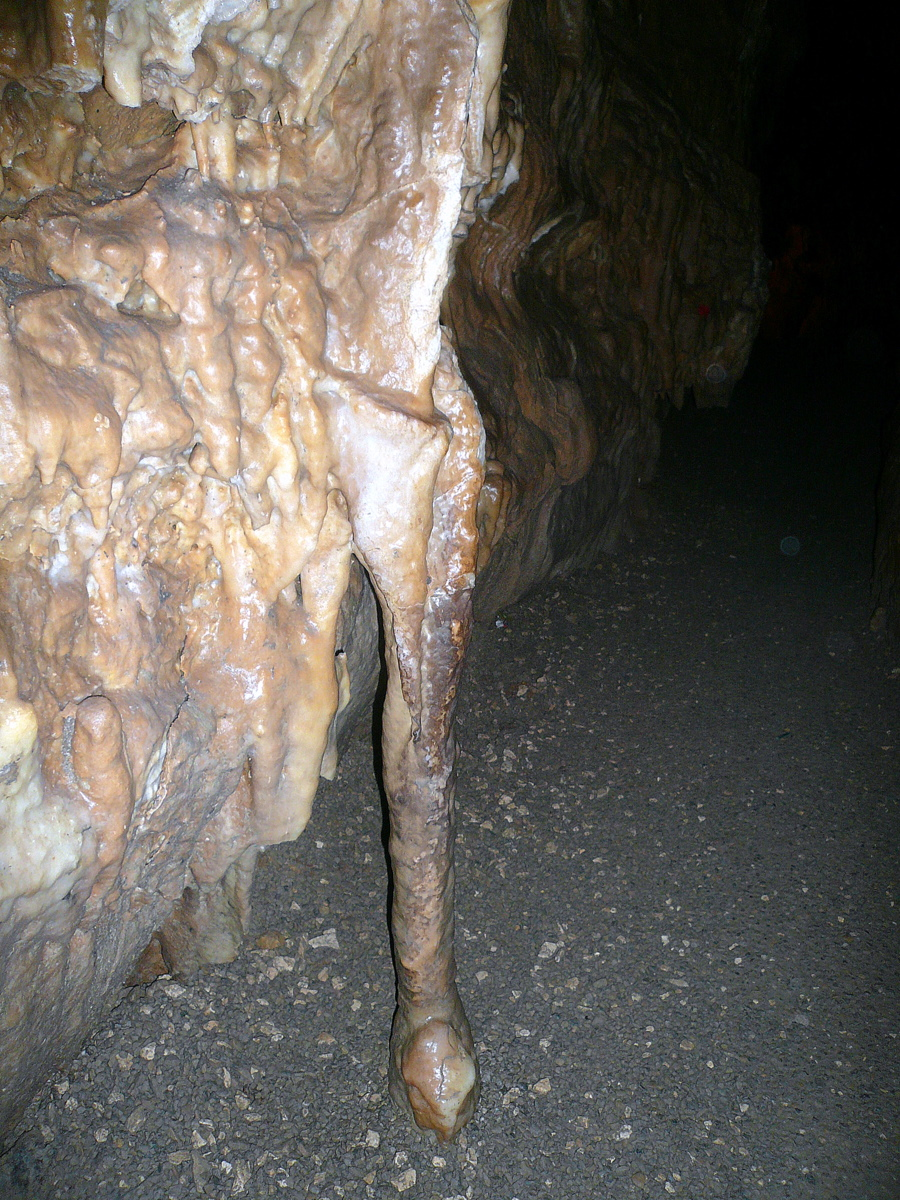
Soil dripstone

In the cave, after a few meters, a larger rock hall is reached. In it are the first stalactites, such as the Berggeist, two meters high and almost two meters in circumference. The Sihlerhalle is named after the first explorer, the head forester Hermann Sihler. At that time, the Berggeist was still bright white. Today it has a much darker color due to impurities. The path then makes a bend of almost 90 degrees, followed by a dry passage called Vulkans Esse. After that, the passage opens to a spacious hall where multiform stalactites can be found. It is called Paulinendom after the only child of the then King Wilhelm II. The next larger hall, also with a multitude of white stalactites, is called the Elfenbeinkammer. The stalactites of the castle inside look like towers and battlements. Through a narrower corridor we go again to a larger hall about 98 meters from the entrance, the Refektorium der Mönche. In it there are many stalagmites and curtain-like stalactites. Through an ogival section of the passage continues to the pulpit with pulpit speaker, named after the floor stalactites that have grown there up to the ceiling. One of the most beautiful parts of the cave follows 163 meters after the entrance with the treasure chamber. Inside there is a stalactite wall about three meters high, like a frozen waterfall. The cave explorers reached it in 1893 after clearing away the mountain of rubble at the entrance. The only artificially created passage is passed. After that, a somewhat narrower passage leads to the high chimney, 222 meters from the entrance. At this point, a chimney branches off vertically upwards for about 14 meters. At its end is a horizontal passage about 50 meters long, equipped with numerous stalactites, which, however, cannot be walked on or seen during the tour.

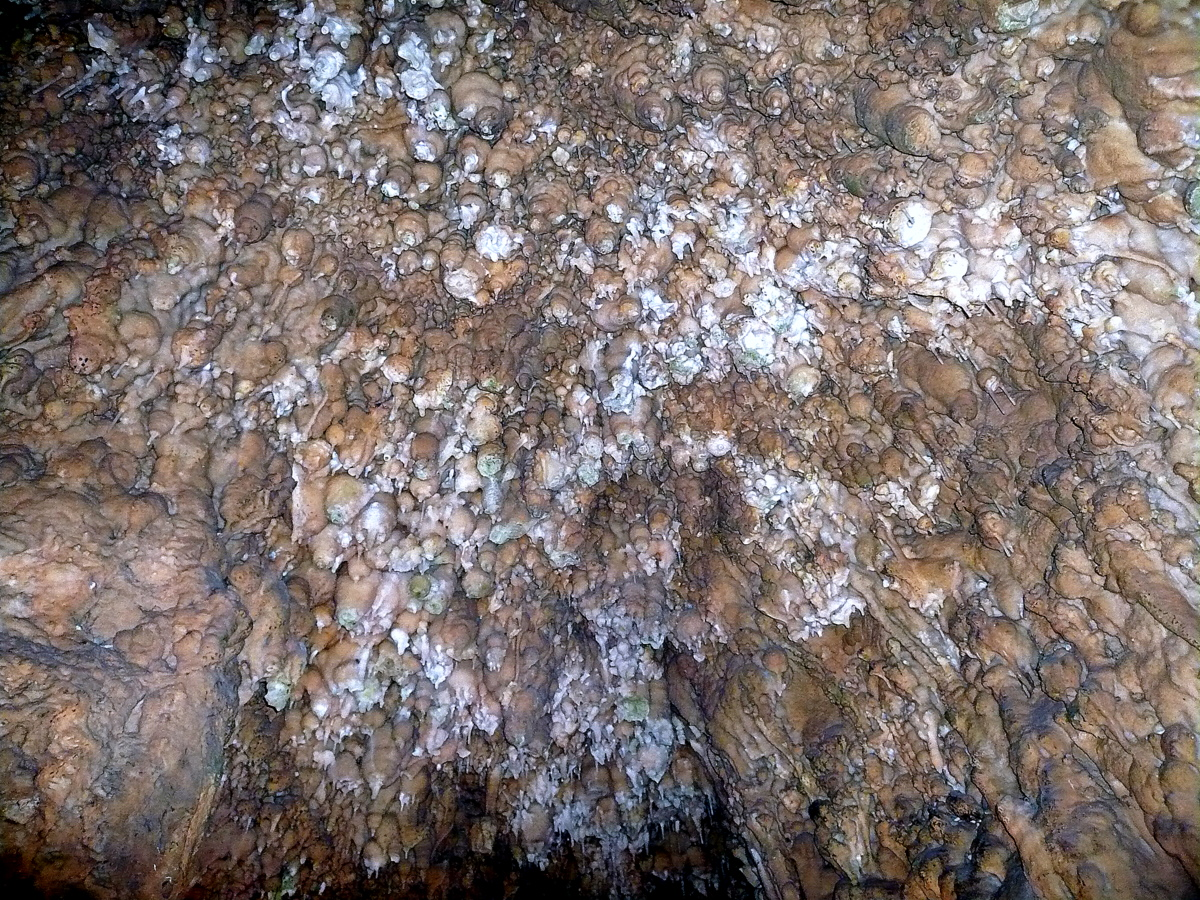
Beet-like ceiling dripstone in the Rettichgrube

After the chimney, the cave passage makes several turns, then follows the King's Hall with the King's Throne. There, during the development, a staircase was built to reach the cyclops vault. The rock is wildly fissured due to the constant erosion. The next rooms are the Rettichgrube and Braustübchen. A special feature of the Charlotte Cave are thousands of radish and turnipy-like stalactites on the ceiling, which are not to be found in this variety in any other show cave in Germany. The following passage widens into a large hall, the Hohen Chorturm. Numerous stalactites hang from the wide-span high vault. The hall is almost 400 meters from the cave entrance. After that, a passage leads to the Kapelle with many floor and ceiling stalactites, some of which are large in size. 436 meters from the entrance follows the Göttersaal, one of the most beautiful halls. There are the most peculiar stalactite forms there. In addition to numerous ceiling stalactites, there is a large floor stalactite called the Schiefer Turm, which reminds one of the Leaning Tower of Pisa because of its slanted position. After several turns, the path leads through the Wilhelmsportal. There, across the cave passage, there is a block of stalactite. Two stalactites with a height of one and a half meter respectively have grown on it. The Wilhelmsportal is named after King Wilhelm II. From there it is 31 meters to the end of the cave. The guide path ends after 532 meters. Various attempts to dig for a presumed continuation of the cave were fruitless. To get back to the entrance, it goes all the way back.

== Flora and fauna ==
=== Wildlife ===
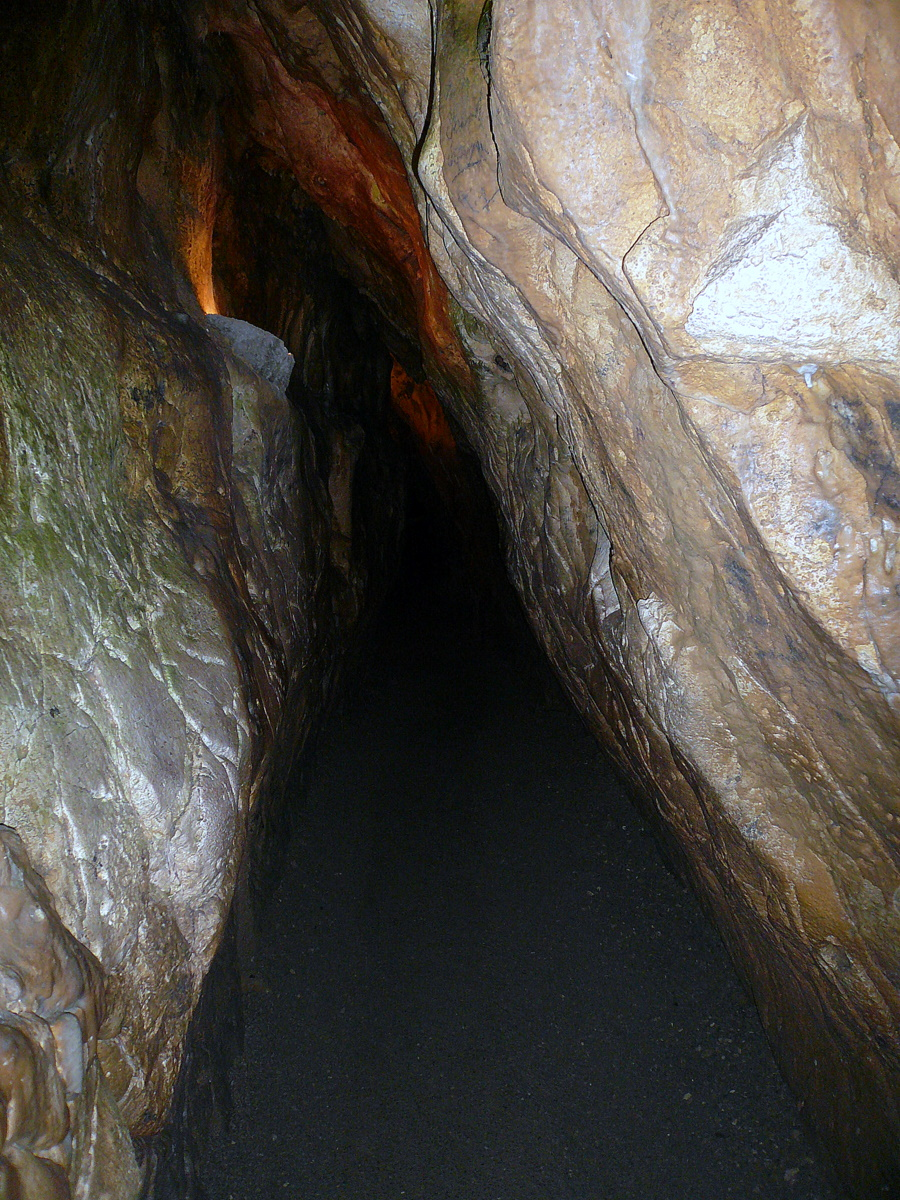
Cave passage

The fauna of the cave was explored several times. Detailed work was done by Kurt Lampert in 1908 and by E. Strand in 1907 and 1910. Further research was done by H. Hölker and Hans Löhrl in 1960. Also from 1960 are relevant researches by Klaus Dobat. Three groups of animals are distinguished. The cave-foreign animals get into the cave by chance, because they stray there. They soon perish, since the cave is not their actual habitat. Another group are the cave species (troglophiles), who spend their entire life in the cave. However, they can also exist in the outside world. The third group is called troglobionts and has characteristics that allow it to live permanently in the cave. Animals of all three groups have been found in Charlotte Cave.

Six species of cave spiders (Nesticidae) are known, including the troglophilous spider species Lepthyphantes pallidus and Nesticus cellulanus. The Linyphiidae Lepthyphantes pallidus is only two millimeters in size. Hygrophilous (moisture-loving) is the cave spider Nesticus cellulanus. Opiliones are also found in the cave. In water pools there are small, usually only up to one millimeter in size, white and eyeless springtails (Collembola), of which ten species are known so far. They belong to the troglobionts. As a butterfly, there is the herald (Scoliopteryx libatrix L.), a moth of the Noctuidae family. Of the flies (Diptera), there are mosquitoes such as the common house mosquito (Culex pipiens L.) and flies such as Helomyza serrata L.

Rodents in the cave include the European edible dormouse (Glis glis). Several species of microbats have been recorded in the cave. They hibernate there from about November until March and April and are among the most highly developed cave dwellers. Studies on the bats of Charlotte Cave were undertaken by Löhr in 1960. The lesser horseshoe bat (Rhinolophus hipposideros) was most frequently represented. The second most frequently observed by Löhr was the greater mouse-eared bat (Myotis myotis). Less frequently encountered is the little blackish western barbastelle (Barbastella barbastellus). The remaining five bat species, the serotine bat (Eptesicus serotinus), Bechstein's bat (Myotis bechsteinii), the whiskered bat (Myotis mystacinus), Natterer's bat (Myotis nattereri), and the brown long-eared bat (Plecotus auritus), were encountered only sporadically. Currently, of the two most common bat species, only the greater mouse-eared bat is encountered. The lesser horseshoe bat has not been recorded since the 1970s.

=== Lampenflora ===
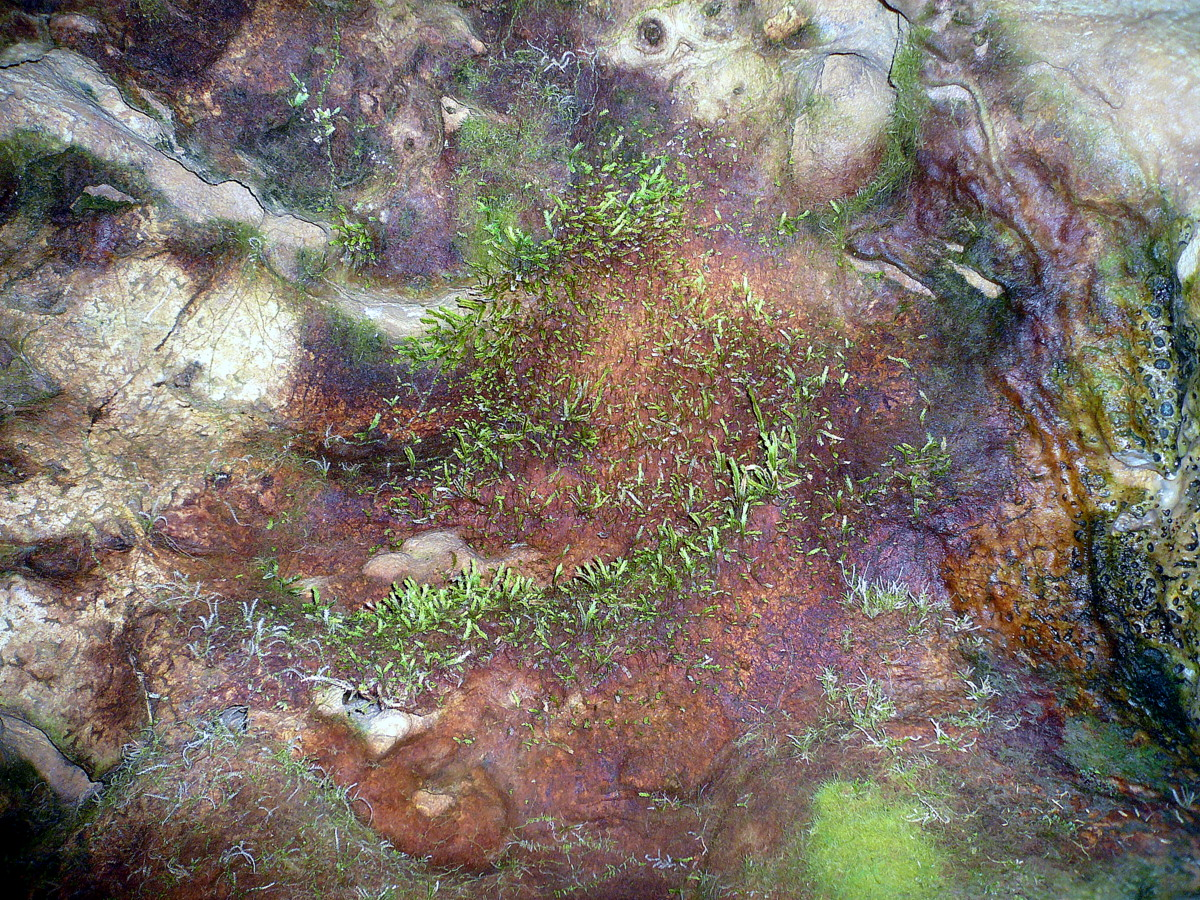
Lampenflora

In the glow of the lampenflora, a distinctive plant community known as lamp flora has developed in Charlotte Cave. In the area of the light sources, mainly algae, mosses and fern plants can settle. These are mostly stunted forms that could not survive in absolute darkness without artificial lighting. In some cave areas, no or only a small lamp flora could develop due to the dryness. In addition, two fungal species independent of the lighting, the Mucor mucedo and the fir leaflet (Gloeophyllum abietinum), were able to colonize.

The lampenflora was examined in 1960 by W. Weber, Otti Wilmanns and K. Mahler and in 1966 by Klaus Dobat. In addition to nine Cyanobacteria (Cyanophyta) and green algae species (Chlorophyta), 31 different mosses (Bryophyta) and two ferns (Pteridophyta-Filices) were found. Except for Charlotte Cave and Bear's Cave, Marchantia polymorpha L. could not be detected in any other show cave in Germany. In Charlotte Cave, the algae, mosses, and ferns must survive a dark period of several months during the dormant phase of show cave operation in winter.

=== Fossils ===
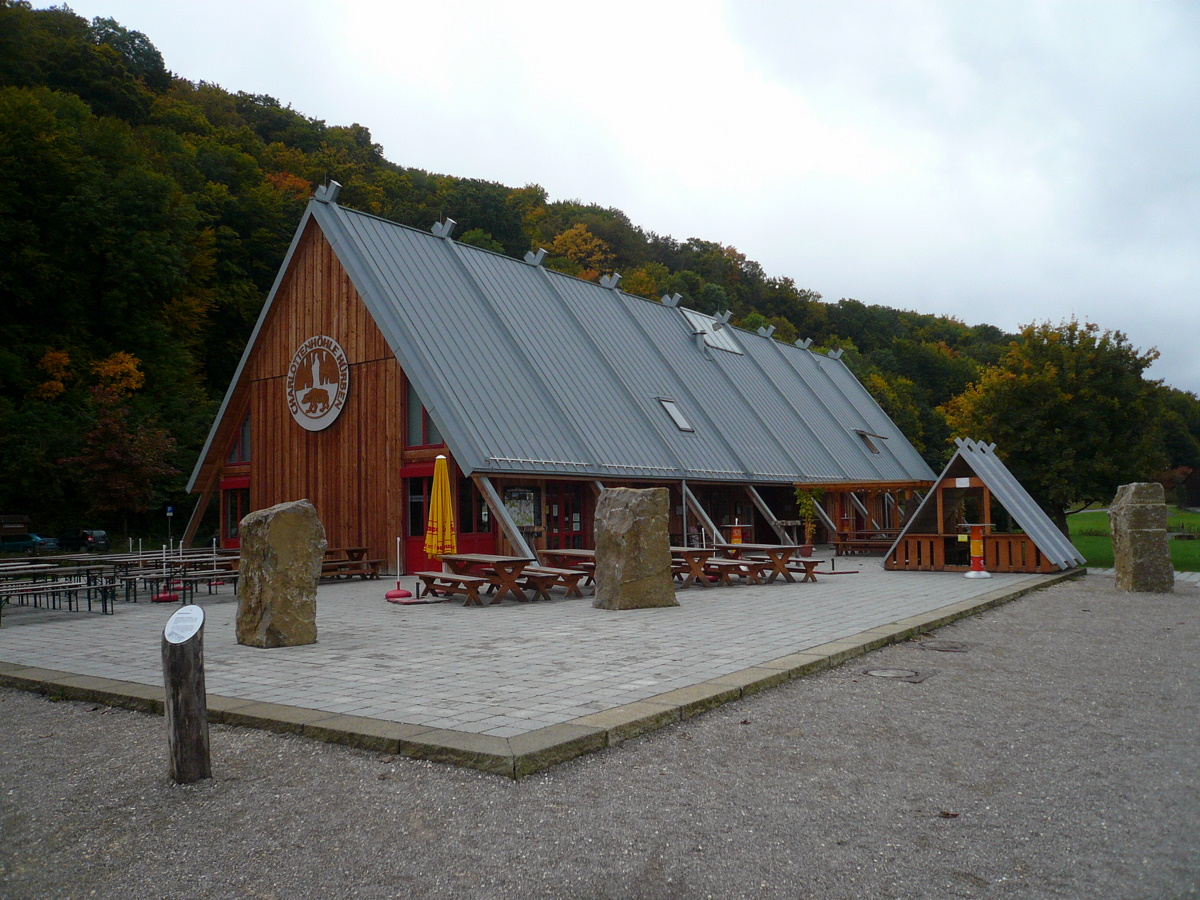
HöhlenHaus

Numerous Late Pleistocene mammal remains have been found in Charlotte Cave, all of which can be attributed to the last great ice age. This is due to the fact that the cave had a ground level entrance for a long time before it was buried and washed up. In 1893, excavations took place in the cave for scientific research and for the installation of electric lighting. Eberhard Fraas found remains of eight Ice Age mammals, including two metatarsals of the steppe lion (Panthera spelaea) and an upper jaw fragment of a cave hyena (Crocuta crocuta spelaea). Shortly after the discovery of the cave, on 29 June 1893, he reported in Kirchheim unter Teck at the 48th General Assembly of the Verein für vaterländische Naturkunde in Württemberg on excavated bones and teeth of a small slender form of the cave bear (Ursus spelaeus).

During the excavation of the buried cave entrance, bones of wild horse (Equus ferus) and reindeer (Rangifer tarandus) were recovered. Excavations also revealed remains of the woolly rhinoceros (Coelodonta antiquitatis) and a wild cattle (Bos), as well as the large- and small-bodied cave bear. A total of 136 skeleton parts were found. They were brought to the Royal Natural History Cabinet in Stuttgart for safekeeping. In 1960, further excavations took place in the cave, during which more finds were made, such as those of an ice-age big cat, including an ulna bone 45 centimeters long. Numerous bones such as those of horses, cattle, sheep, pigs, cats and dogs are more recent and probably come from animals that entered the cave through the dog hole only after the actual cave entrance was closed. Remains of ice-age hunters as in caves in the neighboring Lonetal valley, for example Bird Cave, could not be proven in Charlotte Cave.

== Tourism ==
=== General ===
On the road south of Hürben is a large parking lot with public toilets and the HöhlenHaus, which is open daily. It houses an information and service center that offers insights into the earth's history of the region and provides information about the formation and history of Charlotte Cave. The portal of the Swabian Alb GeoPark is also located there. The HöhlenSchauLand diagonally opposite the cave house with the adventure exhibition Faszination Höhle-Mensch-Natur is also open daily all year round. On 450 square meters of exhibition space, the history and geology of the cave are scientifically conveyed in various thematic areas and various rock and earth layers of the Swabian Alb are explained on models. Near the parking lot begins the time travel trail to the cave, which leads at eight stations from the present to the past. At the cave is a small kiosk for the sale of tickets and souvenirs.

=== Tours ===
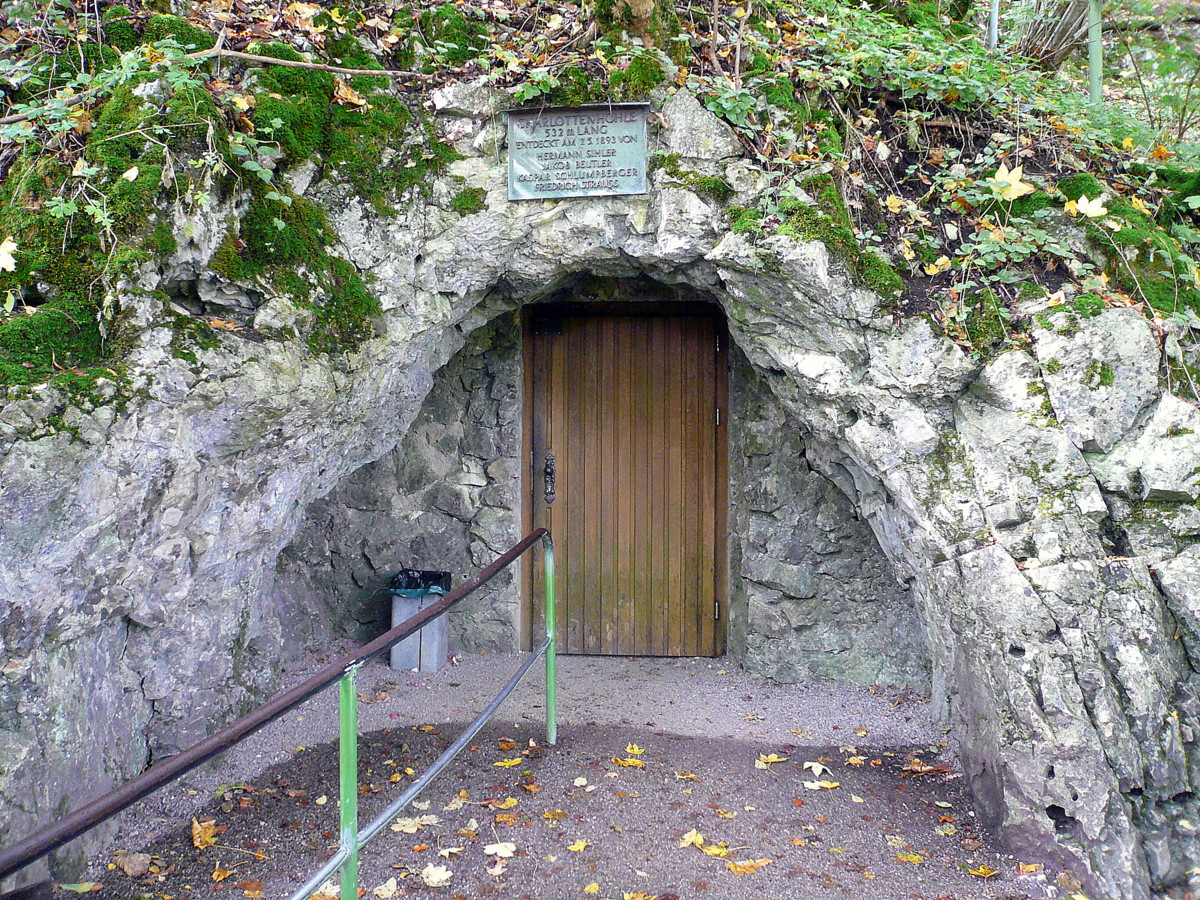
Cave entrance

Daily guided tours from the beginning of April to the end of October (except Sundays) use easily accessible paths into the individual cave extensions and past the stalactite formations, with a total of 74 steps. A guided tour, covering a distance of 532 meters, lasts about 45 minutes. The cave has a large number of stalactites and stalagmites. This is the longest of the guide routes of all show caves in the Swabian Alb and one of the longest in Germany. Since the cave has only one entrance, after reaching the end of the cave, the same route must be walked back. The temperature in the cave is constantly about nine degrees Celsius with humidity of over 80 percent. Guided tours in French are also available upon request and special tours for children and adults are conducted. During the sensory guidance to stations for seeing, smelling and touching, the cave light is turned off and each visitor is equipped with a flashlight.

=== Visitor numbers ===
In 1893, the year the cave was opened, it was visited by 15,000 people. In the next few years, the number of visitors declined rapidly, as Hürben and the cave were difficult to reach by road. The number of visitors was only about 3000 annually before the Second World War. From the 1950s, when motorization and interest in caves increased due to the discovery of new compartments in the Bear's Cave near Erpfingen, visitor numbers increased again. At that time, they were 32,000 to 38,000 annually. The increase continued into the 1960s. In 1968 and 1969, there were new visitor records of 40,000 and 42,500, respectively.

In the 1970s, the 50,000 mark was exceeded several times. In the 1990s, the annual number of visitors dropped again to 35,000. Since the turn of the millennium, contrary to the general trend in German show caves, there has been an increase in visitor numbers again. Within about ten years, they have almost doubled. The high values of the last years can be explained by the increased attractiveness in the surroundings of the cave like the HöhlenHaus from 2005 on. They were 26,334 in 2000, the lowest in the last 20 years, and rose again to over 30,000 the year after next. The highest number was reached in 2007 with 47,255 visitors. In 2015, 38,091 visitors visited the cave.

In the years 2011 to 2015, the average number of visitors was 39,483. With this value, the show cave was in the upper middle range of show caves in Germany. Of the twelve show caves in the Swabian Alb, Charlotte Cave was only surpassed by Bäre Cave (78,200 visitors annually) and Nebel Cave (45,800 visitors annually) in the comparable period. Of the 25 show caves in southern Germany (Baden-Württemberg and Bavaria), Charlotte Cave is surpassed by five caves, with Devil's Cave having the most visitors, averaging 142,500 from 2011 to 2015.

== See also ==
- Mortuary cave

== Bibliography ==
- Große Kreisstadt Giengen, ed. (2000), Die Charlottenhöhle, das Tropfsteinparadies, bei Giengen-Hürben, Giengen an der Brenz: Druckerei Schmid GmbH & Co.
- Karl Dietrich Adam, Hans Binder, Klaus Eberhard Bleich und Klaus Dobat (1968), Verband der Deutschen Höhlen- und Karstforscher e. V. (ed.), "Die Charlottenhöhle bei Hürben", Abhandlungen zur Karst- und Höhlenkunde, vol. Reihe A, Speläologie, no. Heft 3, München: Fr. Mangold’sche Buchhandlung Blaubeuren
- Hans Binder, Anke Luz, Hans Martin Luz (1993), Schauhöhlen in Deutschland, Ulm: Aegis Verlag, ISBN 3-87005-040-3
- Hans Binder, Herbert Jantschke: . 7., völlig neu bearbeitete Auflage. DRW-Verlag, Leinfelden-Echterdingen 2003, ISBN 3-87181-485-7, pp. 168–171.
- Hans Binder (1995), Faszinierende Welt unter der Erde. Höhlen der Schwäbischen Alb, Leinfelden-Echterdingen: DRW-Verlag, p. 54, ISBN 3-87181-366-4
- Stephan Kempe, Wilfried Rosendahl (2008), Höhlen – Verborgene Welten, Stuttgart: Primus Verlag, p. 150, ISBN 978-3-89678-611-1
- Stephan Kempe, ed. (1997), "Welt voller Geheimnisse – Höhlen", HB Bildatlas Sonderausgabe 17, Hamburg: HB Verlags- und Vertriebs-Gesellschaft, p. 103, ISBN 3-616-06739-1
