= Rainen (mountain) =

Mountain in Germany

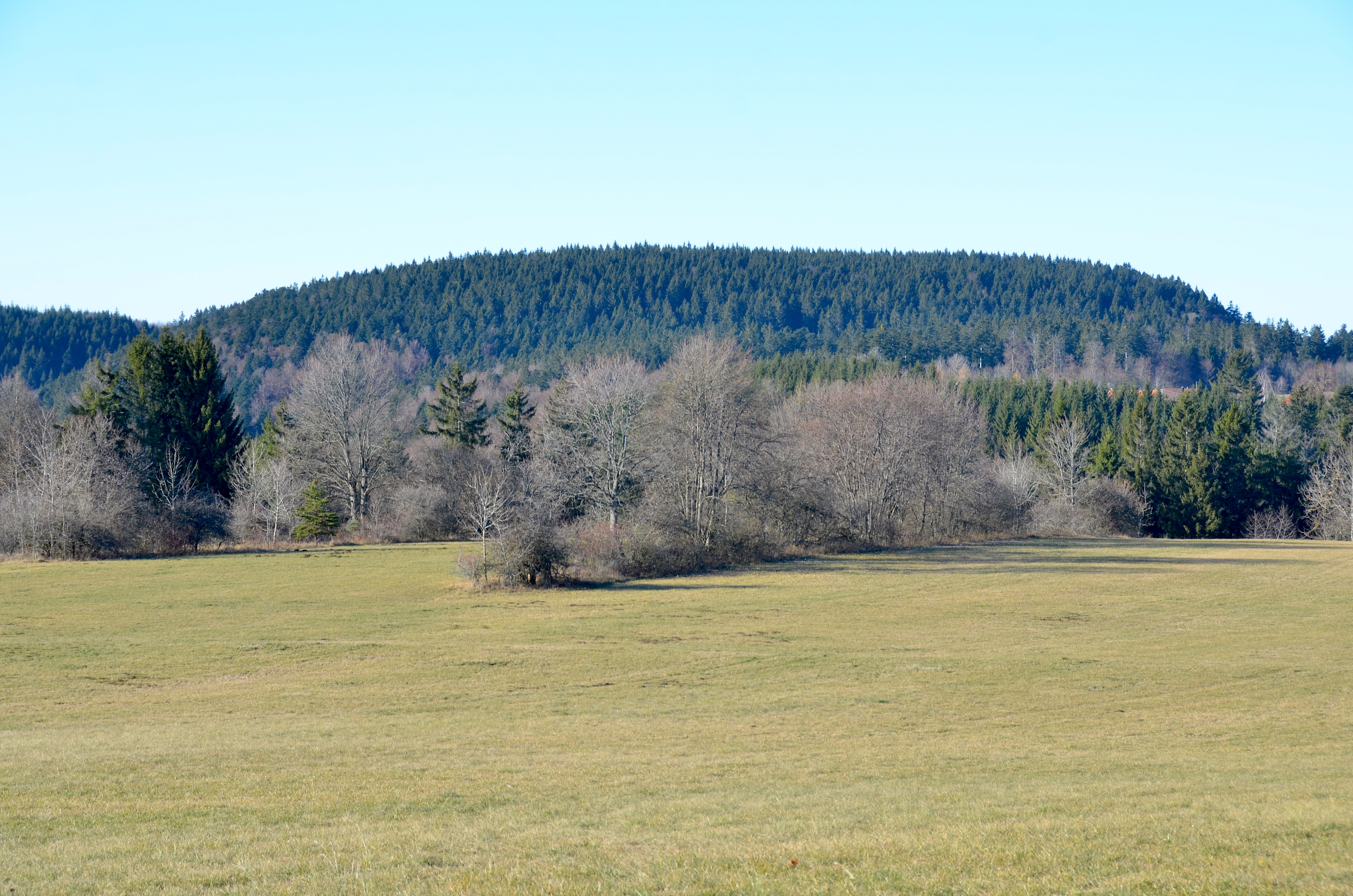
- The Rainen seen from south west

Highest point
- Elevation: 1,006 m above sea level (NHN) (3,301 ft)
- Isolation: 1.87 km (1.16 mi) to Wandbühl
- Coordinates: 48°10.81′N 8°48.39′E

Geography
- Location within Baden-Württemberg
- Location: Deilingen, Tuttlingen, Baden-Württemberg
- Parent range: Swabian Jura

Geology
- Rock type: White Jura

The Rainen is a mountain, 1,006.1 m above sea level (NHN), and the fifth highest peak in the Swabian Jura of southern Germany. It lies about 2 kilometres east of Deilingen and, together with the Montschenloch, Bol and Wandbühl, forms a mountain chain. The Rainen belongs to the Region of the 10 Thousanders and is the northernmost summit in the mountain group.
