= Rainen (forest) =

Forest in Baden-Württemberg, Germany

Rainen is a commercial forest in the municipality of Deilingen in the federal state of Baden-Württemberg in Germany. The fifth-highest elevation of the Swabian Jura, Rainen, is located in this forest area.
