= Wandbühl =

Mountain in southern Germany

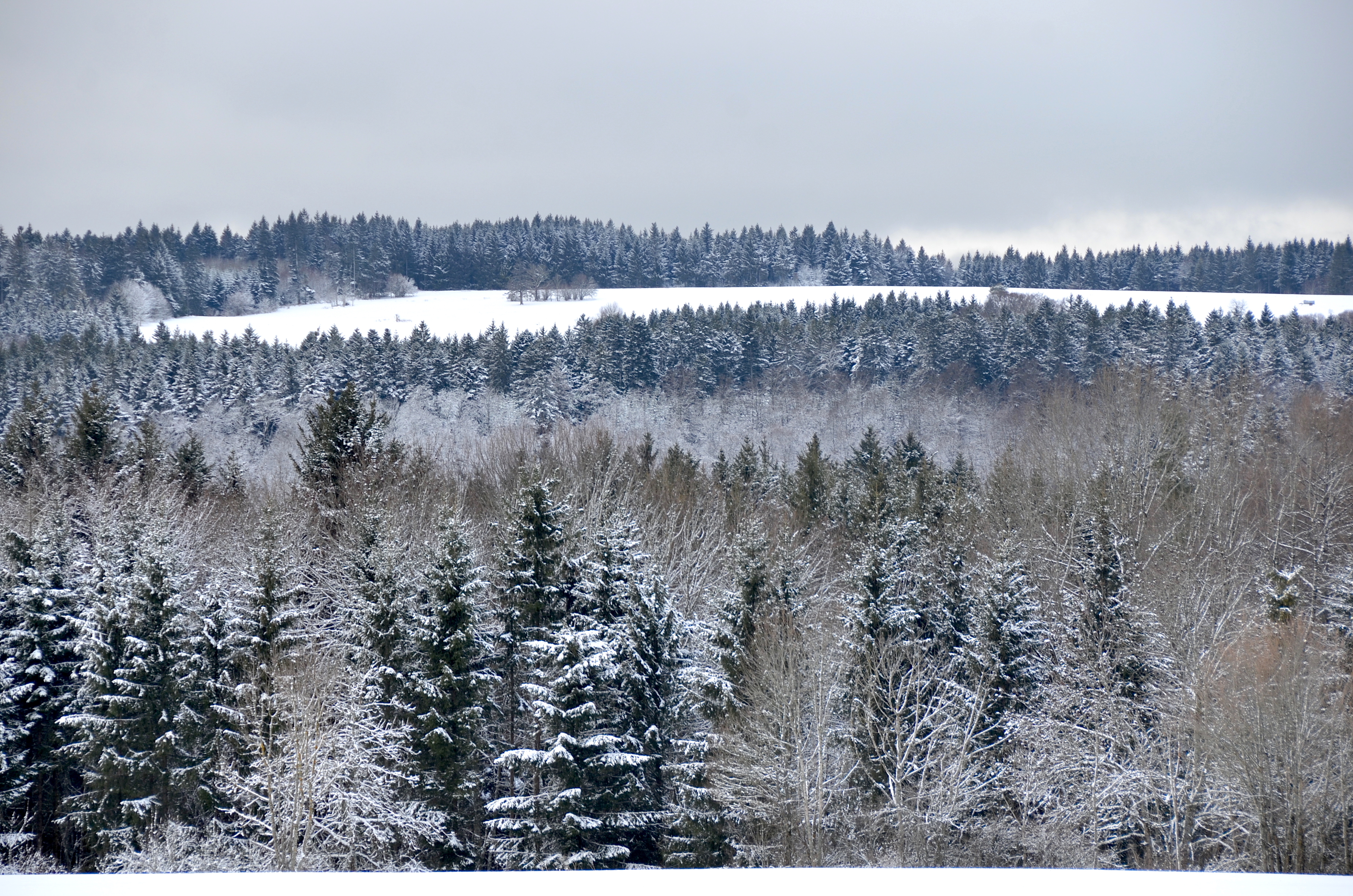
- Wandbühl seen from the northeast

Highest point
- Elevation: 1,007 m above sea level (NHN) (3,304 ft)
- Parent peak: Hochberg (line parent)
- Isolation: 3.29 km (2.04 mi) to Oberhohenberg
- Coordinates: 48°9.81′N 8°48.37′E

Geography
- Location within Baden-Württemberg
- Location: Deilingen, Tuttlingen, Baden-Württemberg
- Parent range: Swabian Jura

The Wandbühl is a mountain, 1,006.7 m above sea level (NHN), and the fourth highest peak in the Swabian Jura in southern Germany. It lies north of the municipality of Wehingen in the state of Baden-Württemberg and is the southernmost summit of a mountain chain that includes the Montschenloch, Rainen and Bol. The Wandbühl is part of the so-called Region of the 10 Thousanders, as well as the Großer Heuberg.
