= Helmut Paulus =

German poet and writer

Helmut Paulus (29 April 1900 – 17 July 1975) was a German poet and writer.

== Life ==
Paulus was born in Genkingen on 29 April 1900. As the son of a pastor, Paulus grew up in a pietistic environment in Sindelfingen and Böblingen. His training as a bookseller in Ludwigsburg was interrupted for a while due to the First World War. He wrote his first literary works while he was still studying. After the war he studied German and history as a guest student at the University of Tübingen from 1920 to 1921. From 1924 to 1925, he spent some time with relatives in Palestine and worked as an accountant. After returning to Germany, he married Gertrude Struve in 1931. In 1932, he opened a bookstore in Magdeburg, which he had to close again in 1934 due to the economic crisis and inflation.

Despite a certain appreciation for Hitler, Paul initially had strong reservations about the National Socialists, especially about fanaticism, hatred, and anti-Semitism. In 1934, he was nevertheless forced to become a member of the Reich Chamber of Literature. In 1936, he joined the National Socialist People's Welfare charity. In 1935, Paulus' debut work, Die Geschichte von Gamelin ("The Story of Gamelin"), was published and received wide acclaim. In 1939, Helmut Paulus was appointed archivist at the German Literature Archive in Marbach. Here he continued to be active as a writer, became a member of the Swabian Poets' Circle and developed strong contacts with the members of the circle. Paulus kept the minutes of meetings and correspondence for the circle of poets.

Paulus' literary works are marked by German nationalism: heroic death, the love of the Fatherland and homeland, loyalty, comradeship and willingness to make sacrifices, all of which were easy to integrate into the National Socialist world view, while his Germanophile and nationalist content reveals a closeness to National Socialist ideology. Accordingly, Nazi literary critic, Hellmuth Langenbucher, nominated Paulus' book Der große Zug among those works "worth reading for the National Socialist who pays his attention to the poetry of our time." However, there are no anti-Semitic elements in his works. In 1940, Paulus joined the NSDAP (membership number 7,486,915) despite his initial misgivings. In 1944, he was drafted into the Wehrmacht and was stationed in Italy where he became a prisoner of war, which he was released from in July 1945.

Paulus then returned to Marbach, where in 1946 proceedings were opened against him, in which he – also through the intervention of Erwin Ackerknecht, the director of the National Schiller Museum in Marbach – was classified as a "follower".

However, one consequence of his activities during the Nazi era was that he was no longer employed at the Schiller Archive. His literary works of the post-war period were no longer successful. Since he no longer saw any professional prospects for himself as a freelance writer in Germany, he emigrated to the US in 1952, where he worked for his wife's relatives. He continued to write literary works until his retirement in 1972, some of which were more successful in Germany. He died on 17 July 1975 in Winnetka, Illinois.

== Works ==
Paulus' works include the following selection:

- Die Geschichte von Gamelin: Roman. Plaut, Düsseldorf 1935.
- Mutterschaft: Gedichte. Plaut. Düsseldorf 1935.
- Der Bamberger Reiter: Novelle. Heyne, Dresden 1936.
- Der Auserwählte: Novelle. Heyne, Dresden 1936.
- Der Ring des Lebens: Roman. Heyne, Dresden 1937.
- Der große Zug: Roman. Heyne, Dresden 1938.
- Ein Weg beginnt: Roman. Heyne, Dresden 1939.
- Der Ring des Lebens: Roman. Andermann, Munich [1940]
- Elf preußische Offiziere. Heyne, Dresden 1941.
- Jahreszeiten: Idyllen. Heyne, Dresden 1941.
- Frieder und Anna: Roman. Heyne, Dresden 1942.
- Die kleine Gartenwelt. Heyne, Dresden 1943.
- Geliebte Heimat: 3 Erzählungen. Gütersloh (1943) (Kleine Feldpost-Reihe).
- Maria und Rudolf: die Geschichte einer späten Heimkehr. Der Bär Verlag, Berlin [ca. 1943] (Berliner Feldhefte).
- Die Träumenden: drei Erzählungen. Vier-Falken-Verlag, Düsseldorf 1947.
- Die drei Brüder: Roman. Vier-Falken-Verlag, Düsseldorf 1949.
- Schillerstadt Marbach. Mit 15 Zeichnungen von Erwin Maier. Schiller-Buchhandlung, Marbach [ca. 1950].
- Die Freibeuter. Andermann, Munich & Vienna 1952.
- Die tönernen Füße: Roman. Vink, Bonn 1953.
- amerika-ballade. Silberburg-Verlag, Stuttgart 1957.

== Literature ==
- Sophie Prasse: Helmut Paulus (1900–1975). Sehnsucht nach Höheren. In: Stephan Molitor (ed.): Der "Schwäbische Dichterkreis" von 1938 und seine Entnazifizierung: Begleitpublikation zu der Ausstellung des Staatsarchivs Ludwigsburg vom 5. Juni bis 6. September 2019. Kohlhammer, Stuttgart 2019, ISBN 9783170365278, pp. 70–74.
