= Willi Betz =

German road haulage and logistics company

Internationale Spedition Willi Betz GmbH & Co. KG
- Type: GmbH & Co KG
- Industry: Logistics
- Founded: 1945
- Headquarters: Reutlingen
- Key people: Rainer Bisinger, Wolfgang Bisinger
- Revenue: > 1.000 Mio. Euro (2008)
- Number of employees: 4,000 (2012)
- Website: www.willibetz.com

The Internationale Spedition Willi Betz GmbH& Co. KG is a German road haulage and logistics company which was founded in 1945 by 17-year-old Willi Betz (5 December 1927 – 12 December 2015) in Undingen, Baden-Württemberg, Germany. Its headquarters are located in Reutlingen, Baden-Württemberg, Germany. Over 4,000 people are employed in more than 40 locations in Europe and the Near and Middle East. With an own vehicle fleet of about 2,000 tractors and 3.000 trailers, Willi Betz GmbH &Co. KG is to one of the largest forwarding and transportation companies in Europe.

Due to his close contacts with the state-owned transportation company SO MAT in Bulgaria in the 1960s, the company was able to expand on an international level. In the 1990s SO MAT has been integrated into the Willi Betz Group and the company had the chance to evolve into a leading forwarding and transportation company in Southeast Europe, Near and Middle East. After privatization, Willi Betz bought the Bulgarian SO MAT, the biggest truck delivery company in the world at the time.

CEO Thomas Betz was convicted of bribery of Georgian and Azerbaijani in a scheme involving hiring underpaid Bulgarian drivers, who were often uninsured, to transport loads in Southeast Europe and beyond for lower wages than other European drivers, while also not declaring Bulgarian employees to the German authorities. Betz was sentenced to five years in prison in 2008, after spending two and a half years in prison during his trial, with those two and a half years already served deducted from his sentence.

Today the Willi Betz Group has branches in 25 countries. In 2008 the company achieved a turnover of over 1 billion euros. At the end of 2011 the company sold its subsidiary LGI to focus on its core business forwarding and transport services as well as the expansion of activities in Eastern Europe. In 2012 Wolfgang Bisinger and Martin Rilling have been appointed CEOs of Internationale Spedition Willi Betz GmbH & Co. KG, in June 2015 Rainer Bisinger succeeded Martin Rilling as CEO.

== Divisions ==
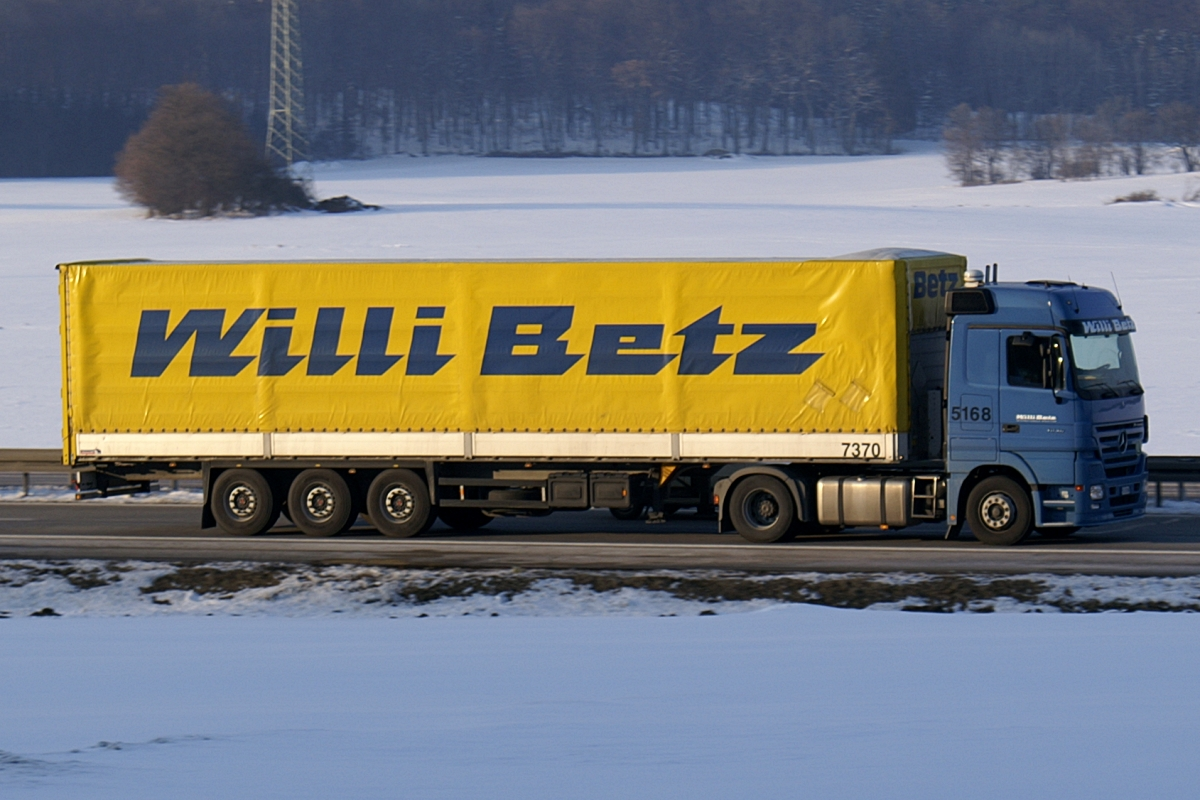
A Willi Betz truck

- Forwarding: Over 4,000 people are employed in 54 locations. The range of services contains General Cargo, Automotive Logistics, Temperature Controlled Transports, Special and Combined Transports.
- Transport: Regarding international cargo the Dedicated Fleet Division with its 2,800 tractors and 4,000 trailers makes sure that the freight arrives on time. This department offers individual timetables and transport concepts for their customers and supports them with a professional drivers management and a Europe-wide network of workshops.
- Automotive: Vehicle sales are carried out in Eastern Europe. In Bulgaria and Macedonia Willi Betz distributes Mercedes-Benz, Chrysler, Jeep, Smart and Mitsubishi. In addition to vehicle sales, Willi Betz offers the corresponding After Sales Services as well.
