= Bear's Cave (Erpfingen) =

- German: Bärenhöhle
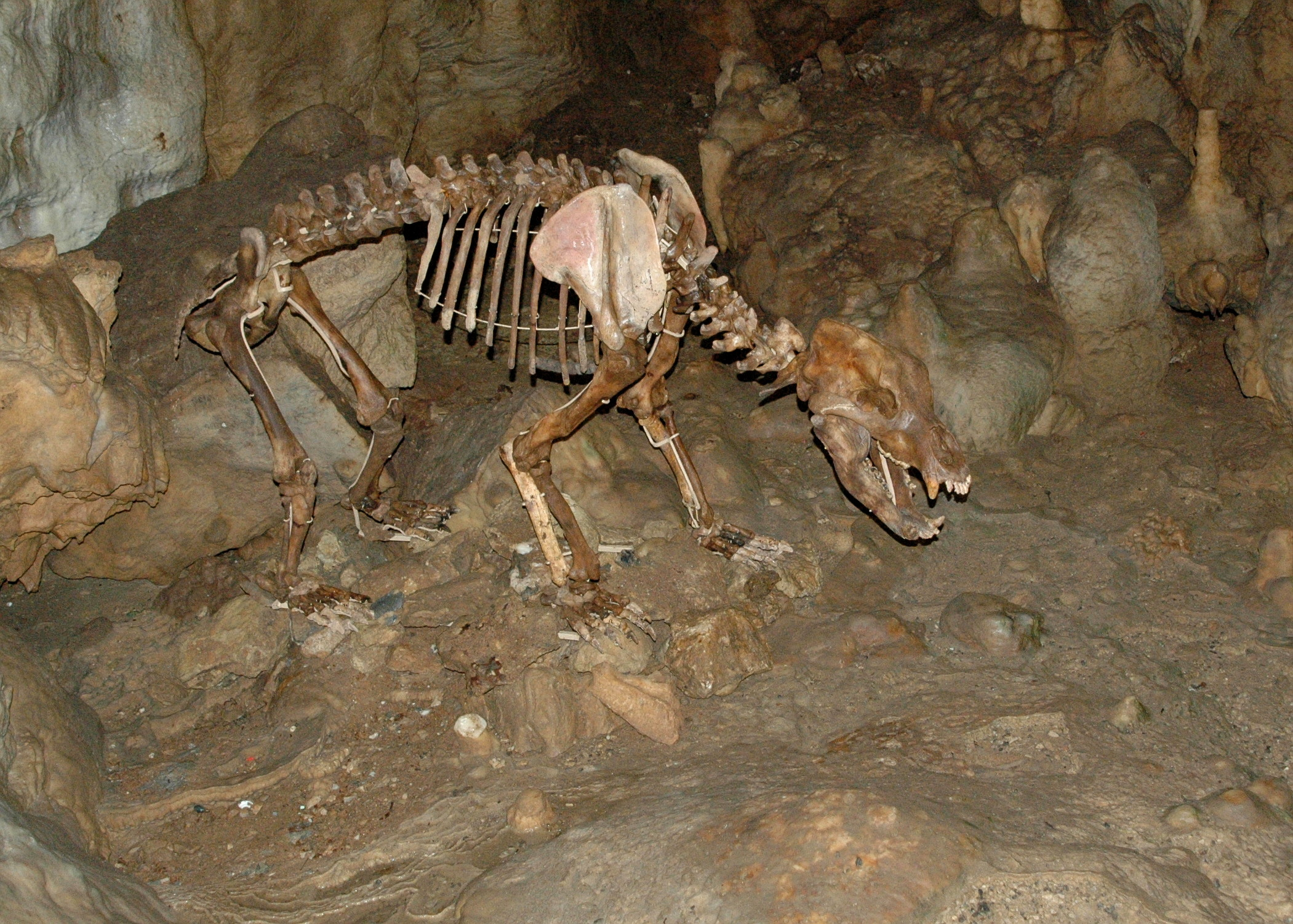
- Reconstructed cave bear skeleton from Bear's cave
- Interactive map of Bear's Cave
- Coordinates: 48°22′15″N 9°12′55″E
- Geology: White Jura

Bear's Cave (German: Bärenhöhle) is a tourist cave in Sonnenbühl, Germany. It is named after the numerous cave bear skeletons found there, that likely inhabited the site 20,000 years ago. With 80,000 visitors annually, it is the most visited show cave in Swabian Jura. Bear's Cave was formed in limestone of the White Jurassic, and provided shelter for various types of prehistoric animals. The caves have also been home to a theme park, Dreamland, since 1974.

The cave is made up of two parts, the Karlshöhle, discovered in 1834, and the Bärenhöhle, discovered in 1949. The first part of the cave was initially vandalised and pillaged by visitors upon its discovery, and was only reopened to the public upon the discovery of the second cave.

== History ==
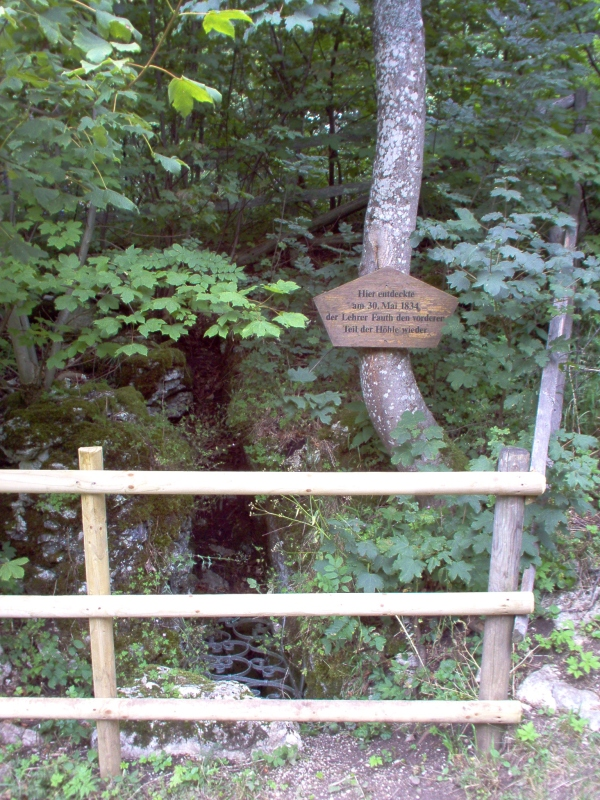
The Fauthsloch

The cave system was developed over a period of about five million years. Fossils show that 20,000 years ago, bears, rhinoceroses and German cave lions roamed the area, and full reconstructions of the bear's skeletons can be viewed on the site today. 8,000 years ago, it was inhabited by humans. The stalactites in the cave were formed in White Jura. Since April 2013, the site has been one of the 26 information points of UNESCO Global Geoparks, Swabian Jura.

=== Discovery of Karlshöhle ===
In 1834, a local teacher known mononymously as "Fauth" accidentally discovered this part of the cave. While collecting herbs, he dropped his Tabaksdose (tobacco packet) into a crevice, which he found he could widen and climb down. The next day, him and his friends opened up the cave to tourists, who raided it for souvenirs, or vandalised its geology. Today, the entrance Fauth found is named "Fauthloch" in his honour.

=== Discovery of Bärenhöhle ===
In 1949, Karl Bez, a recreational cave explorer saw a bat disappear through a crack. He climbed through and found 30 bear skeletons in this undiscovered part of the caves.

== Dreamland ==
The bear-themed park Dreamland (German: Traumland) has been operating in Bear's cave since 1974. The Ferris wheel with the highest location in Europe can be found there.
