= Montschenloch =

Montschenloch (also: Monschenloch) are several land lots covered with commercial forest and meadows in the municipality of Deilingen the federal state of Baden-Württemberg in Germany. The Montschenloch ist also the sixth-highest elevation of the Swabian Jura.
