= Bol (Swabian Jura) =

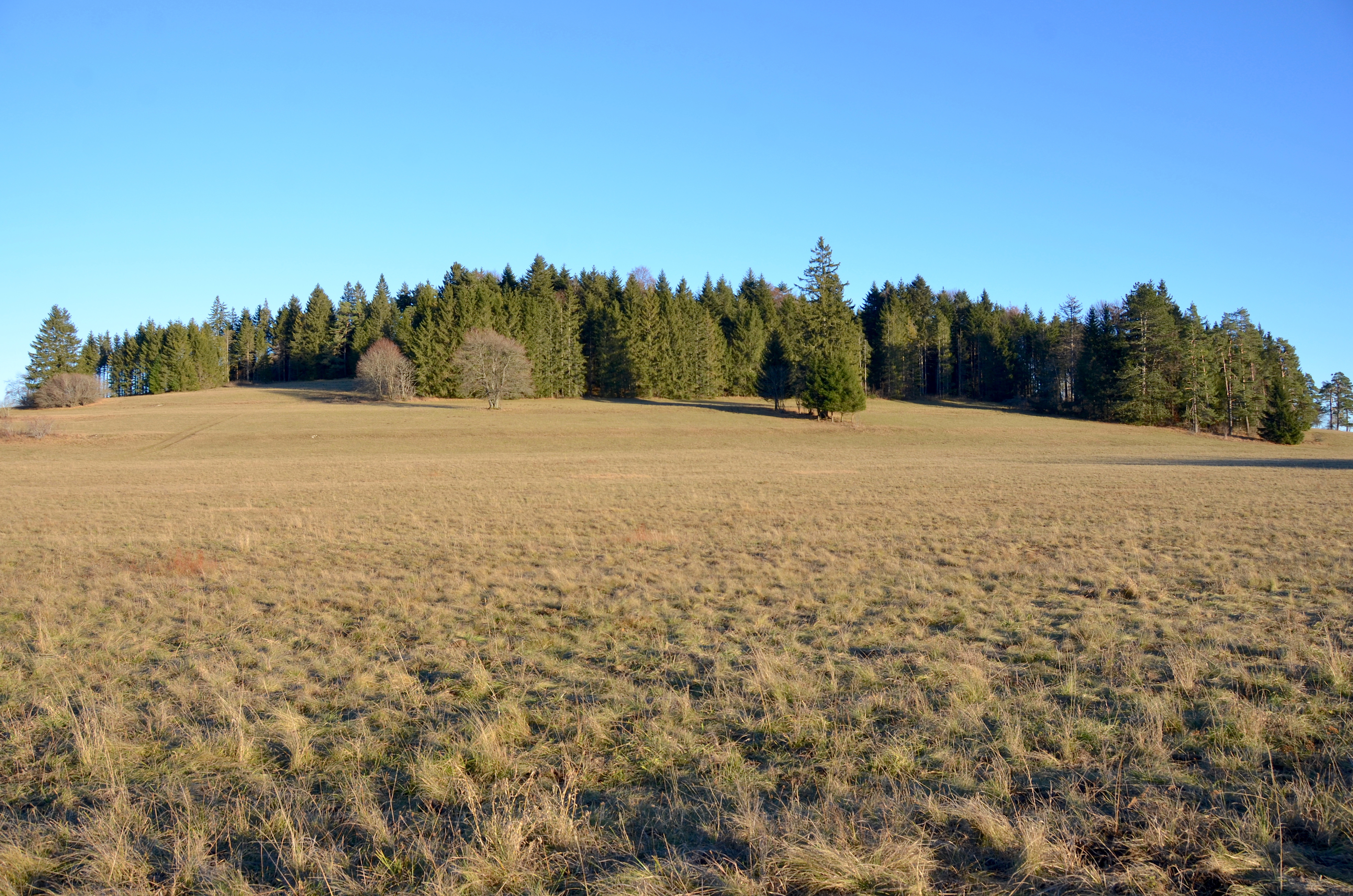
- Ridge prominence of Wandbühl in the Swabian Jura

Highest point
- Elevation: 1,002 m above sea level (NHN) (3,287 ft)
- Prominence: 24 m (79 ft)
- Parent peak: Wandbühl (line parent)
- Isolation: 0.78 km (0.48 mi) to Montschenloch
- Coordinates: 48°10′15.9″N 8°48′18.3″E

Geography
- Location within Baden-Württemberg
- Location: Baden-Württemberg, Germany
- Parent range: Swabian Jura

The Bol is a minor subordinate elevation of the mountain Wandbühl in the Swabian Jura east of the village of Deilingen in the federal state Baden-Württemberg of Germany. It is one of the "ten thousanders."
