= Sonnenbühl =

- Municipality
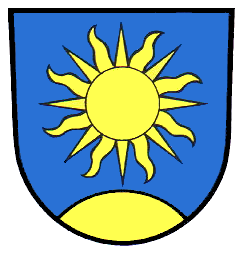
- Coat of arms

- Location of Sonnenbühl within Reutlingen district
- Interactive map of Sonnenbühl
- Location within Germany Location within Baden-Württemberg
- Coordinates: 48°23′22.517″N 09°10′50.207″E
- Country: Germany
- State: Baden-Württemberg
- Admin. region: Tübingen
- District: Reutlingen
- Subdivisions: 4 Ortsteile

Government
  - Mayor (2017–25): Uwe Morgenstern

Area
  - Total: 61.35 km^{2} (23.69 sq mi)
- Elevation: 775 m (2,543 ft)

Population (2025-12-31)
  - Total: 6,955
  - Density: 113.4/km^{2} (293.6/sq mi)
- Time zone: UTC+01:00 (CET)
  - Summer (DST): UTC+02:00 (CEST)
- Postal codes: 72820
- Dialling codes: 07128
- Vehicle registration: RT
- Website: www.sonnenbuehl.de

Sonnenbühl is a municipality in the district of Reutlingen, state of Baden-Württemberg, Germany.

Sonnenbühl is a municipality on the plateau of the Swabian Alb, just south of Reutlingen. The seat of the municipality is in the district Undingen.

== Geographical location ==
Sonnenbühl lies on the northern edge of the Swabian Jura. The district Genkingen (771 m above sea level. NN) extends up to the escarpment. West of Willmandingen (751 m above sea level. NN) originates the Lauchert. In the district Erpfingen (731 m above sea level. NN) originates the Erpf which opens south of the village into the Lauchert. The district Undingen is located 775 m above sea level. NN.

== Geology ==
The near-surface geological bedrock Sonnenbühls is dominated by the rocks of the White Jura. The limestones of the White Jura are heavily karstified and characterized by karst formations such as caves, sinkholes and dry valleys.

== Neighboring communities ==
The following cities and towns are bordering to the municipality of Sonnenbühl, they are starting called clockwise in the north and part of the district of Reutlingen or to Zollernalbkreis¹ and district Tübingen.² Pfullingen, Lichtenstein, Engstingen, Trochtelfingen, Burladingen¹, Mössingen² and Reutlingen.

== Municipality arrangement ==
The municipality Sonnenbühl was created on 1 January 1975 under the municipal reform in Baden-Württemberg, initially under the name Undingen, from the four previously independent municipalities Erpfingen, Genkingen, Undingen and Willmandingen.

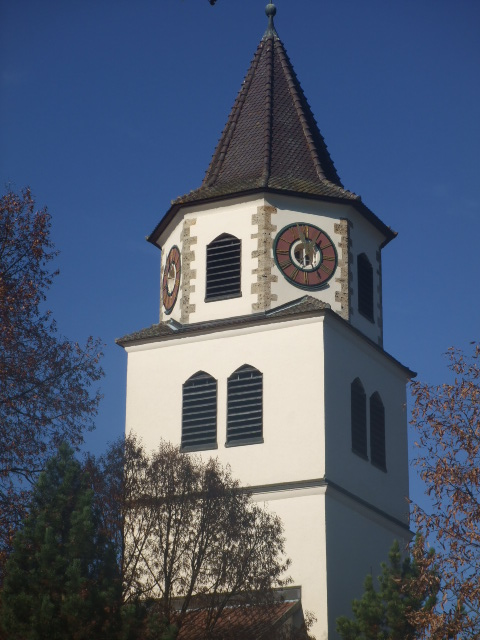
Erpfingen Naboriuskirche

== Climate ==
In February 1978, the district Erpfingen was officially recognized as air spa.

== History ==
The name Erphinga (Erpfingen) appears on November, 16, 777, for the first time in a deed of the Lorsch codex. Genkingen belongs since 1506 to the nunnery Pfullingen and became part of Württemberg after the Thirty Years' War. Already 806 Undinga was owned by the Abbey of St. Gall. 1098 it donated Graf Luithold Achalm the monastery Zwiefalten and 1454 Undingen came to Württemberg. The name Willmandingen stands on a charter of 10 July, 772, of the monastery of St. Gallen. 1474 bought Count Eberhard von Württemberg the place, so it came to Oberamt Urach, in 1808 to district Reutlingen.

== Politics ==
The district Undingen is the administrative headquarter of the total community.

=== Council ===
The council Sonnenbühl has after the last election 21 members (2009: 18). The municipal election held on 25 May 2014 led to the following official results. The turnout was 54.3% (2009: 57.1%). The council consists of the elected honorary councilors and the mayor as chairman. The mayor is entitled to vote in the municipal council.

- Free Voters Association 10 seats 49.8% (2009: 11 seats, 57.6%)
- Sonnenbühl citizens 6 seats 26.9% (2009: 5 seats, 26.8%)
- CDU 5 seats 23.3% (2009: 0 seats, 0.0%)
- Civic Democratic Sonnenbühl 0 seats 0.0% (2009: 2 seats, 15.6%)

=== Mayor ===
The mayor is elected for a term of eight years. On July 12, 2009, the incumbent mayor Gerrit Elser was elected mayor of Giengen. Therefore, a mayoral election was held in Sonnenbühl on October 11, 2009. Uwe Morgenstern was voted with a majority of 58.9%.

- Genkingen
- to 1908: Schumacher
- 1909- ?: John Ruoff
- ? -1950: Weinland
- 1950-1974: Ernst Herrmann
- Undingen
- 1973-1975: Manfred Stierle
- Sonnenbühl
- 1975-1999: Dieter Winkler
- 1999-2009: Gerrit Elser
- Since 2010: Uwe Morgenstern

== Arms of Sonnenbühl ==
The former autonomous districts had very different own crest. Therefore, it was agreed to the merger on designing a brand new coat of arms. This is formed from the two components of the community name. The blazon of the municipal coat of arms is ". In blue over golden (yellow) hills (Buhl) a golden (yellow) sun with 16 alternating consecutive straight and S-shaped curved golden (yellow) rays"

== Coat of subsites ==
Erpfingen Erpfingen Genkingen Genkingen Undingen Undingen Willmandingen Willmandingen

== Twinning ==
Since 1987, there is a partnership of Sonnenbühl with the municipality of Corseul in France.

== Museums ==
In the district Erpfingen the first Easter Egg Museum [5] of Germany was established and inaugurated in February 1993. It shows more than a thousand exhibits from all over Europe.

== Sports ==
In the district Erpfingen is located since 1992 a spa garden and a 1300 meters long summer bobsleigh track. For golf players there is in Undingen an 18-hole golf course. In winter, there are a variety of trails for cross country skiers, in the summer, these are walking trails.

== Tourism ==
The amusement park Dreamland on the Bear Cave (Bärenhöhle) is a real attraction, especially for families with small children.

== Economy ==
The area is used both for agriculture and forestry. Sonnenbühl is a year-round holiday destination. These include Sonnenmatte, swimming and camping at Erpfingen, cycling, hiking and ski trails and touristically developed attractions such as the caves. A ski lift at Genkingen allows downhill. In quarries on the northern edge of Willmandingen and Genkingen limestone is broken. In Willmandingen formerly Bohnerz was recovered.

=== Transport ===
The municipality is connected in north-south direction through the provincial road 382 and east-west direction through the provincial road 230. The public transport is ensured by the Verkehrsverbund Neckar-Alb-Donau (NALDO). The community is located in the comb 223.

== Conservation ==
The area between Schloss Lichtenstein and Nebelhöhle is a nature reserve.

== Natural monuments ==
The major attractions in Sonnenbühl are probably the two large caves Bärenhöhle and Nebelhöhle. The Bärenhöhle is part of the district Erpfingen and is accessible to 271 meters in length. It was discovered in 1949. The first part of the Nebelhöhle was discovered in 1517. The visitable part is 450 meters long.

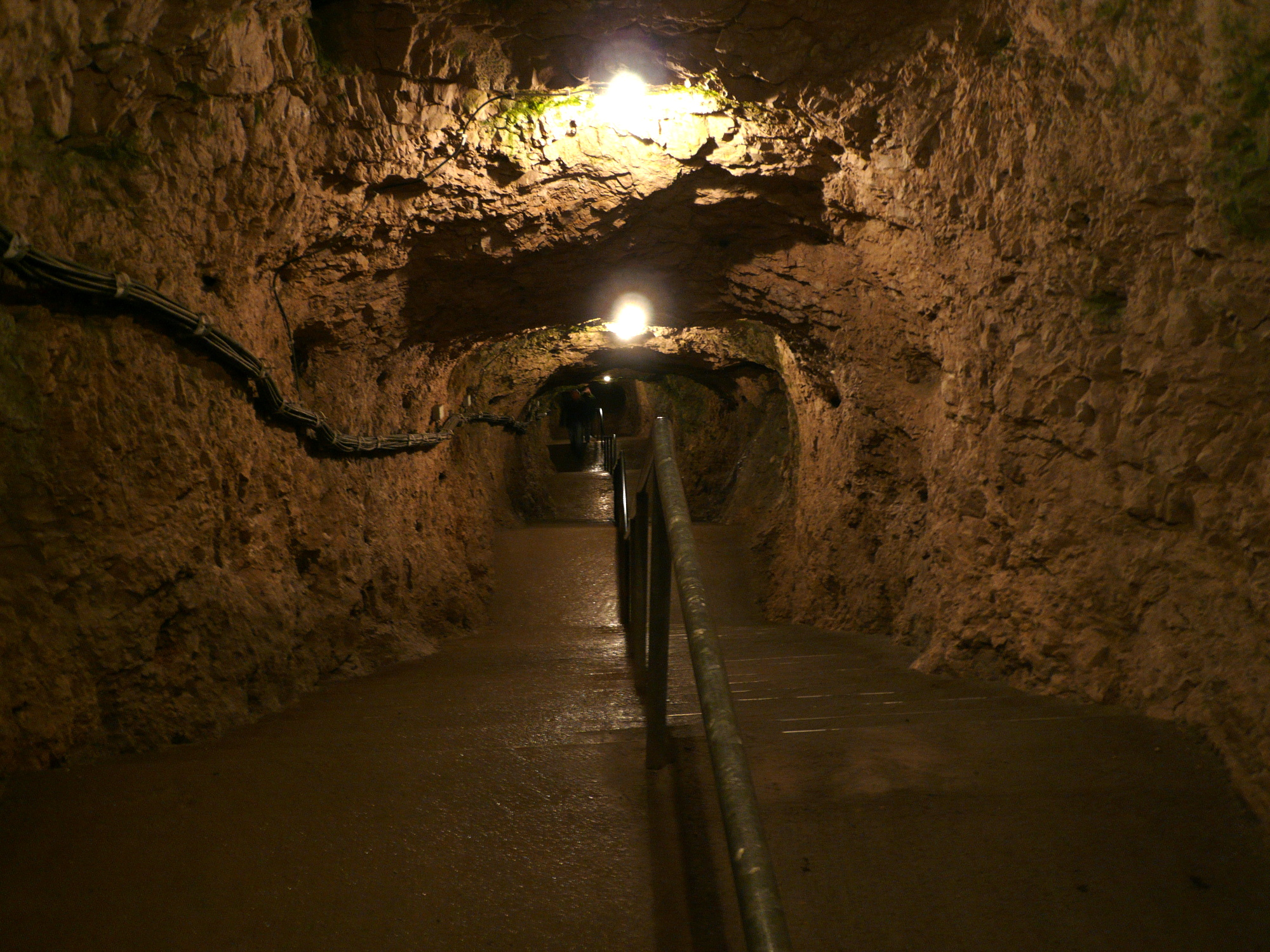
Nebelhöhle

== Sons and daughters of the town ==
- Johann Ludwig Schneller (1820–1896), a Protestant missionary and educator in Jerusalem (born in Erpfingen)
- Johann Martin Flad (1831–1915), a Protestant missionary in the mission to the Falashas in Ethiopia
- Heinz Schanz (1927–2003), painter
- Willi Betz (1927-2015), forwarder. Founder of the freight forwarding and logistics company Willi Betz (born in Undingen).
- Otwin Brucker (born 1940), mayor in Pliezhausen, former President of the Municipality Day Baden-Württemberg
