= Deilingen =

- Town
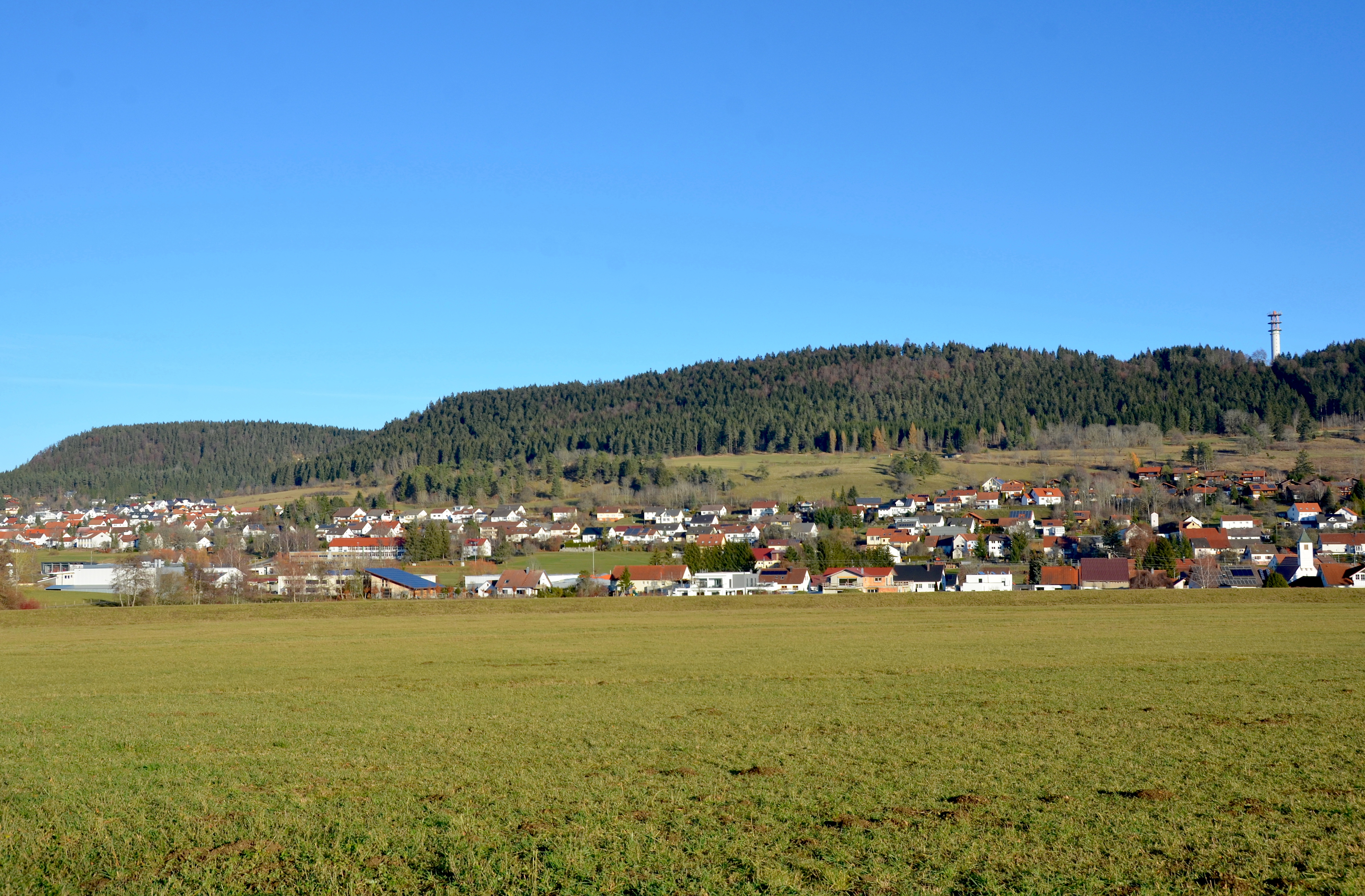
- View across Deilingen towards Montschenloch and Ortenberg (left)

- Coat of arms

- Location of Deilingen within Tuttlingen district
- Interactive map of Deilingen
- Location within Germany Location within Baden-Württemberg
- Coordinates: 48°10′37″N 08°46′59″E
- Country: Germany
- State: Baden-Württemberg
- Admin. region: Freiburg
- District: Tuttlingen

Government
  - Mayor (2017–25): Albin Ragg

Area
  - Total: 10.92 km^{2} (4.22 sq mi)
- Elevation: 826 m (2,710 ft)

Population (2025-12-31)
  - Total: 1,870
  - Density: 171/km^{2} (444/sq mi)
- Time zone: UTC+01:00 (CET)
  - Summer (DST): UTC+02:00 (CEST)
- Postal codes: 78586
- Dialling codes: 07426
- Vehicle registration: TUT
- Website: www.deilingen.de

Deilingen is a municipality in the district of Tuttlingen in Baden-Württemberg in Germany.
