= White Jurassic =

Set of geological formations in Central Europe

Lithostratigraphy of the South German Jurassic. Abbreviations: Humph.-Fm = Humphriesioolith Formation; L.Bk-Fm = Liegende Bankkalk Formation; H.Bk-Fm = Hangende Bankkalk Formation; Zm-Fm = Zementmergel Formation; S.-Fm = Solnhofen Formation; Rö.-Fm = Rögling Formation; U.-Fm = Usseltal Formation; Mö.-Fm = Mörnsheim Formation; N.-Fm = Neuburg Formation; R.-Fm = Rennertshofen Formation

The White Jurassic or White Jura (German: Weißer Jura or Weißjura) in Earth history refers to the upper of the three lithostratigraphic units of the South German Jurassic, the latter being understood not as a geographical, but a geological term in the sense of a lithostratigraphic super group. Formerly and even occasionally today in the popular scientific literature, this term is equated to the chronostratigraphic series of the Upper Jurassic. This is however not quite correct, because the White Jura does not exactly coincide with the chronostratigraphic boundaries of the Upper Jurassic. In addition, the term Malm, which was formerly frequently used as a synonym should no longer be used in connexion with the South German Jurassic. Instead the term "Malm" should be reserved for the roughly equivalent lithostratigraphic unit in the North German Jurassic. The White Jurassic was deposited about 161-150 million years ago. The White Jurassic follows the lithostratigraphic unit of the Brown Jurassic. Its upper boundary is erosive. Locally the White Jurassic is overlain with a large stratigraphic hiatus of the Regensburg Green Sandstone (Cenomanian).

== See also ==
- Black Jurassic

== Literature ==
- Gert Bloos, Gerd Dietl & Günter Schweigert: Der Jura Süddeutschlands in der Stratigraphischen Tabelle von Deutschland 2002. Newsletters on Stratigraphy, 41(1-3): 263-277, Stuttgart, 2005, ISSN 0078-0421
- Eckhard Mönnig: Der Jura von Norddeutschland in der Stratigraphischen Tabelle von Deutschland 2002. Newsletters on Stratigraphy, 41(1-3): 253-261, Stuttgart, 2005.
- Friedrich August Quenstedt: Das Flözgebirge Würtembergs. Mit besonderer Rücksicht auf den Jura. Verlag der Laupp'schen Buchhandlung, Tübingen, 1843.
- Friedrich August Quenstedt: Der Jura. Verlag der Laupp’schen Buchhandlung, Tübingen, 1856-57.
