= Rastatt (Landtag electoral district) =

State electoral district of Germany

32: Rastatt
- Electoral district for the Landtag of Baden-Württemberg
- Rastatt in 2026
- District: Rastatt
- Electorate: 112,748 (2026)
- Major settlements: Au am Rhein, Bietigheim, Bischweier, Durmersheim, Elchesheim-Illingen, Forbach, Gaggenau, Gernsbach, Iffezheim, Kuppenheim, Loffenau, Muggensturm, Ötigheim, Rastatt, Steinmauern, and Weisenbach

Current electoral district
- Party: CDU
- Member: Alexander Becker

Rastatt is an electoral constituency (German: Wahlkreis) represented in the Landtag of Baden-Württemberg.

Since 2026, it has elected one member via first-past-the-post voting. Voters cast a second vote under which additional seats are allocated proportionally state-wide. Under the constituency numbering system, it is designated as constituency 32.

It is wholly within the district of Rastatt.

== Geography ==
The constituency includes the municipalities of Au am Rhein, Bietigheim, Bischweier, Durmersheim, Elchesheim-Illingen, Forbach, Gaggenau, Gernsbach, Iffezheim, Kuppenheim, Loffenau, Muggensturm, Ötigheim, Rastatt, Steinmauern, and Weisenbach, within the district of Rastatt.

There were 112,748 eligible voters in 2026.

== Members ==
=== First mandate ===
Both prior to and since the electoral reforms for the 2026 election, the winner of the plurality of the vote (first-past-the-post) in every constituency won the first mandate.

Election	Member	Party	%
1976	Roland Gerstner	CDU	
1980	Roland Gerstner	CDU	
1984	Roland Gerstner	CDU	
1988	Thomas Schäuble	CDU	
1992	Thomas Schäuble	CDU	
1996	Thomas Schäuble	CDU	
2001	Thomas Schäuble	CDU	52.5
Oct 2004	Karl-Wolfgang Jägel	CDU	52.5
2006	Karl-Wolfgang Jägel	CDU	46.0
2011	Karl-Wolfgang Jägel	CDU	38.2
2016	Kirsten Lehnig	Grüne	26.4
Aug 2016	Thomas Hentschel	Grüne	26.4
2021	Thomas Hentschel	Grüne	30.4
2026	Alexander Becker	CDU	34.7

=== Second mandate ===
Prior to the electoral reforms for the 2026 election, the seats in the state parliament were allocated proportionately amongst parties which received more than 5% of valid votes across the state. The seats that were won proportionally for parties that did not win as many first mandates as seats they were entitled to, were allocated to their candidates which received the highest proportion of the vote in their respective constituencies. This meant that following some elections, a constituency would have one or more members elected under a second mandate.

Prior to 2011, these second mandates were allocated to the party candidates who got the greatest number of votes, whilst from 2011-2021, these were allocated according to percentage share of the vote.

Election	Member	Party	Member	Party
1980	Dieter Stoltz	SPD		
1984	Heinz Goll	SPD		
1988	Heinz Goll	SPD		
1992	Heinz Goll	SPD		
1996	Heinz Goll	SPD		
2001	Gunter Kaufmann	SPD		
2006	Gunter Kaufmann	SPD		
2011	Ernst Kopp	SPD		
2016	Ernst Kopp	SPD	Sylvia Felder	CDU
Sep 2018	Jonas Weber	SPD	Sylvia Felder	CDU
Apr 2019	Jonas Weber	SPD	Alexander Becker	CDU
2021	Jonas Weber	SPD	Alexander Becker	CDU

== Election results ==
=== 2026 election ===
State election (2026): Rastatt
Notes:	Blue background denotes the winner of the electorate vote. Pink background denotes a candidate elected from their party list. Yellow background denotes an electorate win by a list member, or other incumbent. A ✓ or ✗ denotes status of any incumbent, win or lose respectively.						
Party	Candidate	Votes	%	±%	Party votes	%	±%
CDU	Alexander Becker	25,469	34.7	▲10.9	22,280	30.3	▲10.2
AfD	Philipp Helber	17,016	23.2	▲10.6	16,807	22.8	▲10.2
Greens	✗ Thomas Hentschel	15,174	20.7	▼9.7	18,860	25.6	▼4.7
SPD	Jonas Weber	8,407	11.5	▼2.1	5,274	7.2	▼6.4
FDP	Petra Zink	3,219	4.4	▼3.6	2,856	3.7	▼4.3
Left	Felix Richter	2,789	3.8	▲1.0	2,450	3.3	▲0.5
FW					1,709	2.3	▼1.5
BSW					871	1.2	
APT					816	1.1	
Volt	Niko Metzler	1,231	1.7	▲1.1	559	0.8	▲0.1
PARTEI					300	0.4	▼0.9
dieBasis					230	0.3	▼1.0
Values					154	0.2	
Pensioners					139	0.2	
Team Todenhöfer					109	0.1	
ÖDP					70	0.1	
PdF					65	0.1	
Bündnis C					48	0.1	
Verjüngungsforschung					48	0.1	
KlimalisteBW					34	0.0	▼1.0
Humanists					30	0.0	
Informal votes		817			513		
Total valid votes		73,305			73,609		
Turnout		74,122	65.7	▲6.0			
CDU gain from Greens	Majority	8,453	11.5				

== See also ==
- Politics of Baden-Württemberg
- Landtag of Baden-Württemberg
