= Illingen =

Illingen may refer to:

- Illingen, Saarland in the Neunkirchen district, Germany
- Illingen, Baden-Württemberg in the Enz district, Germany

== See also ==
- Elchesheim-Illingen, a village in Germany
