= Ötigheim =

- Municipality
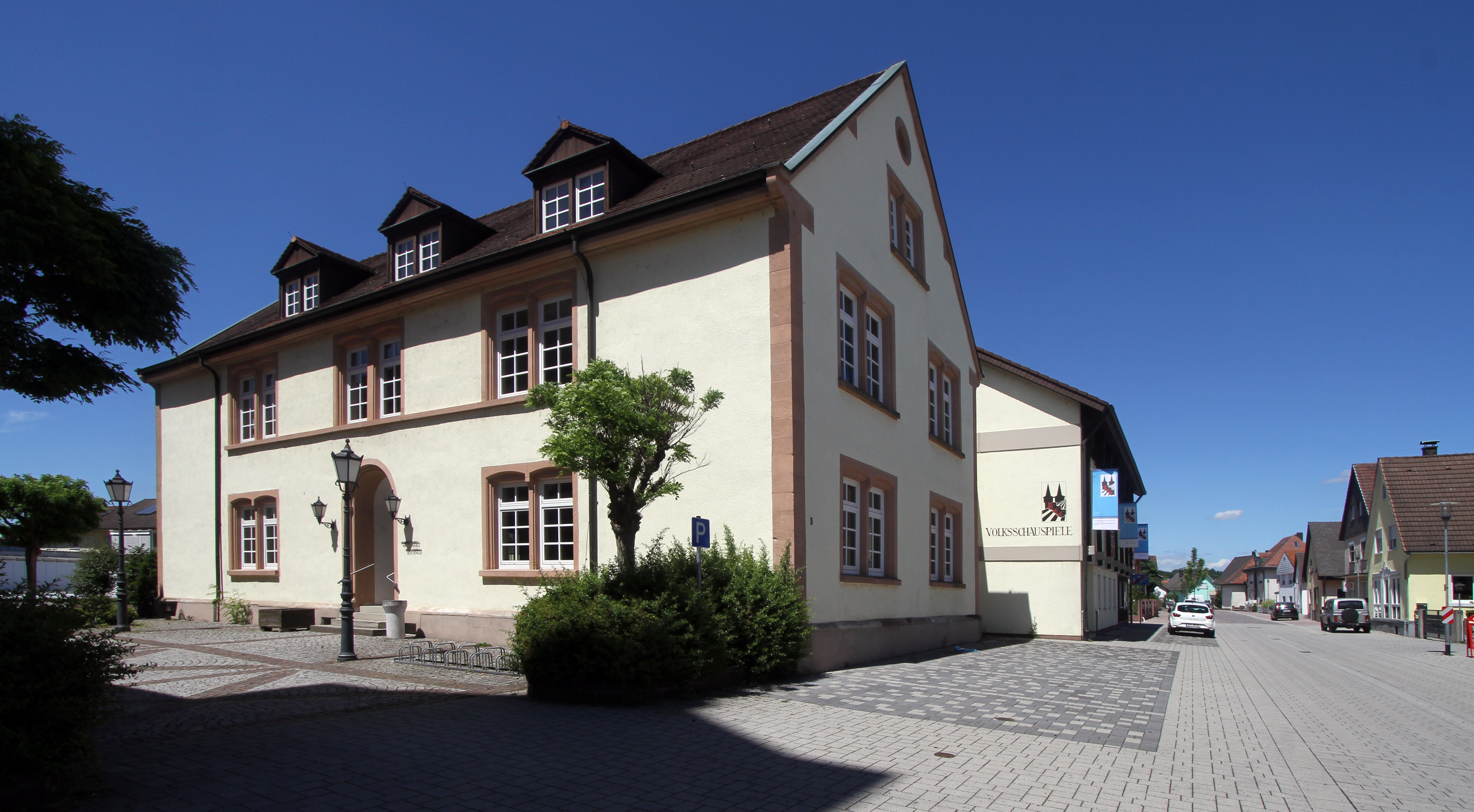

- Coat of arms

- Location of Ötigheim within Rastatt district
- Interactive map of Ötigheim
- Location within Germany Location within Baden-Württemberg
- Coordinates: 48°53′28″N 08°14′11″E
- Country: Germany
- State: Baden-Württemberg
- Admin. region: Karlsruhe
- District: Rastatt

Government
  - Mayor (2021–29): Robert Wein

Area
  - Total: 10.97 km^{2} (4.24 sq mi)
- Elevation: 124 m (407 ft)

Population (2025-12-31)
  - Total: 5,004
  - Density: 456.2/km^{2} (1,181/sq mi)
- Time zone: UTC+01:00 (CET)
  - Summer (DST): UTC+02:00 (CEST)
- Postal codes: 76470
- Dialling codes: 07222
- Vehicle registration: RA
- Website: www.oetigheim.de

Ötigheim (Low Alemannic: Etje) is a town in the district of Rastatt in Baden-Württemberg in Germany. Its immediate neighbours are the towns of Bietigheim and Steinmauern.

== Mayors ==
- 1945-1955: Eugene Reuter (CDU)
- 1976-2013: Werner Happold (CDU)
- 2013-2020: Frank Kiefer
- Since 2020: Robert Wein
