= Bietigheim (Baden) =

- Municipality
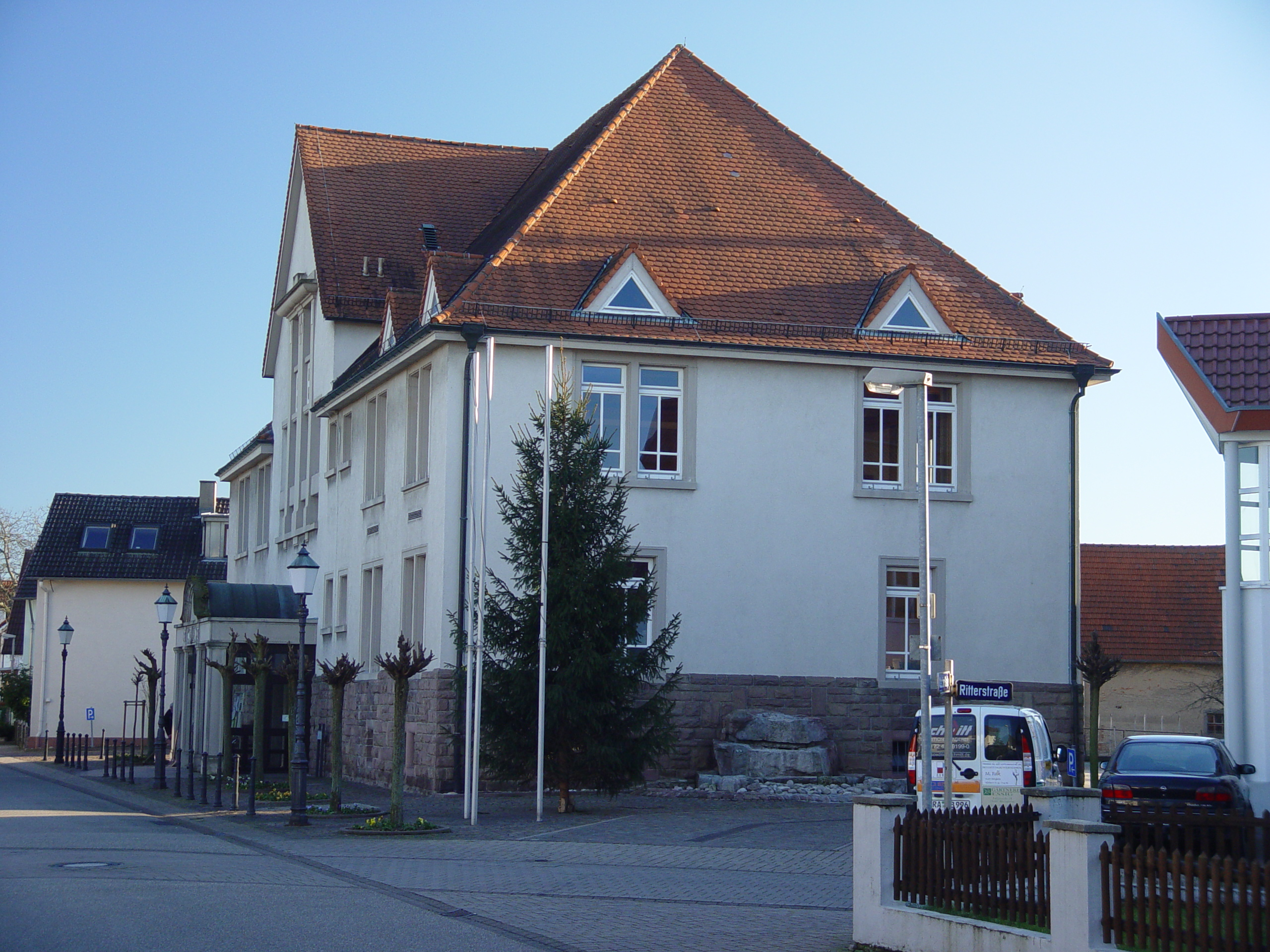
- Town hall

- Coat of arms

- Location of Bietigheim within Rastatt district
- Interactive map of Bietigheim
- Location within Germany Location within Baden-Württemberg
- Coordinates: 48°54′37″N 08°15′11″E
- Country: Germany
- State: Baden-Württemberg
- Admin. region: Karlsruhe
- District: Rastatt

Government
  - Mayor (2023–31): Constantin Braun (Ind.)

Area
  - Total: 13.90 km^{2} (5.37 sq mi)
- Elevation: 121 m (397 ft)

Population (2025-12-31)
  - Total: 6,473
  - Density: 465.7/km^{2} (1,206/sq mi)
- Time zone: UTC+01:00 (CET)
  - Summer (DST): UTC+02:00 (CEST)
- Postal codes: 76462–76467
- Dialling codes: 07245
- Vehicle registration: RA
- Website: www.bietigheim.de

Bietigheim is a village in the district of Rastatt in Baden-Württemberg in Southwestern Germany. It is located east of the Rhine river and thus the border to France, west of the Black Forest (more precisely the Northern Black Forest), south of the city of Karlsruhe and north of the city of Rastatt.

== Geography ==
Bietigheim is located in the 30 km wide Upper Rhine Plain which is limited by the Black Forest on the east side and the French Vosges / German Palatinate Forest on the west side. The village itself extends from the fluvial terrace to the actual rhine valley. On the southern part of Bietigheim's Gemarkung is the southern end of the forest Hardtwald.

The closest cities to Bietigheim are: Rastatt (~ 7 km), Karlsruhe (~ 18 km) and Baden-Baden (~ 23 km).

== Neighbour towns and villages ==
Bietigheim borders on the following towns, clockwise beginning from the north: Durmersheim, Malsch, Muggensturm, Ötigheim, Steinmauern, Elchesheim-Illingen.

== Transport ==
Bietigheim is predominantly a village in which people live as commuter to the cities Karlsruhe, Rastatt and even for the valley of the river Murg (Northern Black Forest).

=== Rail links ===
The village maintains the stop Bietigheim (Baden) of the Rhine Railway (Baden). The light rail lines S7 and S8 of the Albtal-Verkehrs-Gesellschaft both stop in Bietigheim.

=== Road transport ===
The Bundesstraße 3, the Bundesstraße 36 as well as the Bundesautobahn 5 running through the Gemarkung of Bietigheim. Furthermore, two rest areas: Schleifweg (northern direction) and Silbergrund (southern direction) are stationed on Bietigheim's part of the BAB5. In October 2006 the Bundesstraße 36 was moved to the east side and thus out of the city center.

Further one out of eleven colza oil-fuel stations of the state Baden-Württemberg are located in Bietigheim.

=== Air transport ===
With an approximate distance of 20 km (12 mi) the Airport Karlsruhe/Baden-Baden (German: Flughafen Karlsruhe/Baden-Baden, IATA airport code FKB) and the second most important airport of Baden-Württemberg is the closest airport. Other airports are reachable by car via BAB5 / BAB8 or train. The next further airport is Stuttgart Airport (German: Flughafen Stuttgart, IATA airport code STR) and ~ 92 km (57 mi) away. Frankfurt Airport (German: Flughafen Frankfurt am Main, IATA airport code FRA) is ~ 141 km (88 mi) away (one and a half hour drive by car).

== Mayors ==
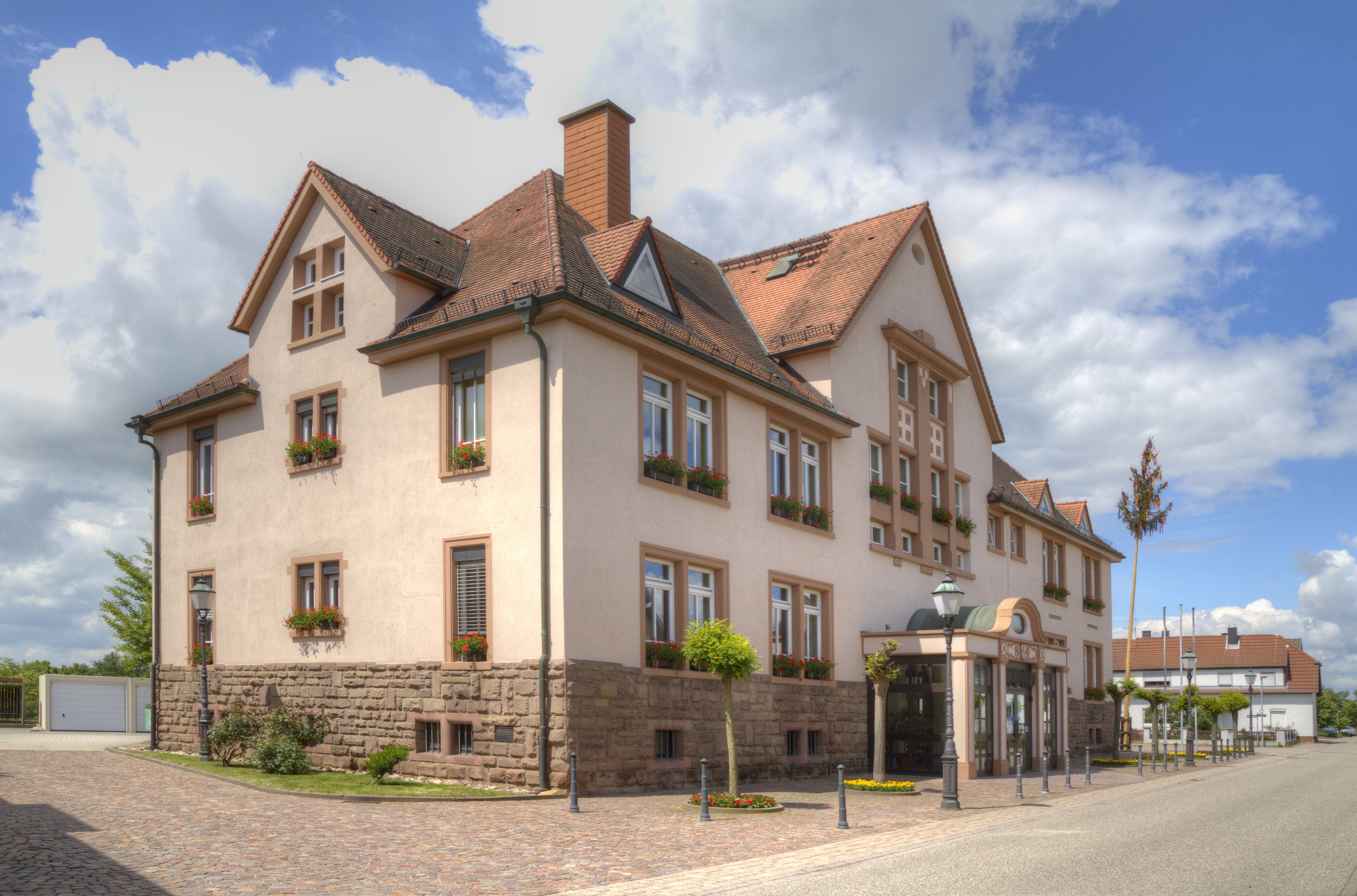
Town hall

- 1945 - 1946: Ludwig Hammer (1898-1956)
- 1948 - 1975: Wilhelm Heck (1910-1975)
- 1976 - 1992: Rüdiger Schäfer (born 1950)
- 1992 - 2016: Ernst Kopp (born 1954)
- since 2016: Constantin Braun (born 1987)

== Personalities ==
=== Sons and Daughters of the community ===
- August Klingler (1918-1944), soccer player

=== Other persons associated with the place ===
- Kurt Bürger (Karl Ganz) (1894-1951), politician, short time Minister President of Land Mecklenburg
