= Elchesheim-Illingen =

- Municipality
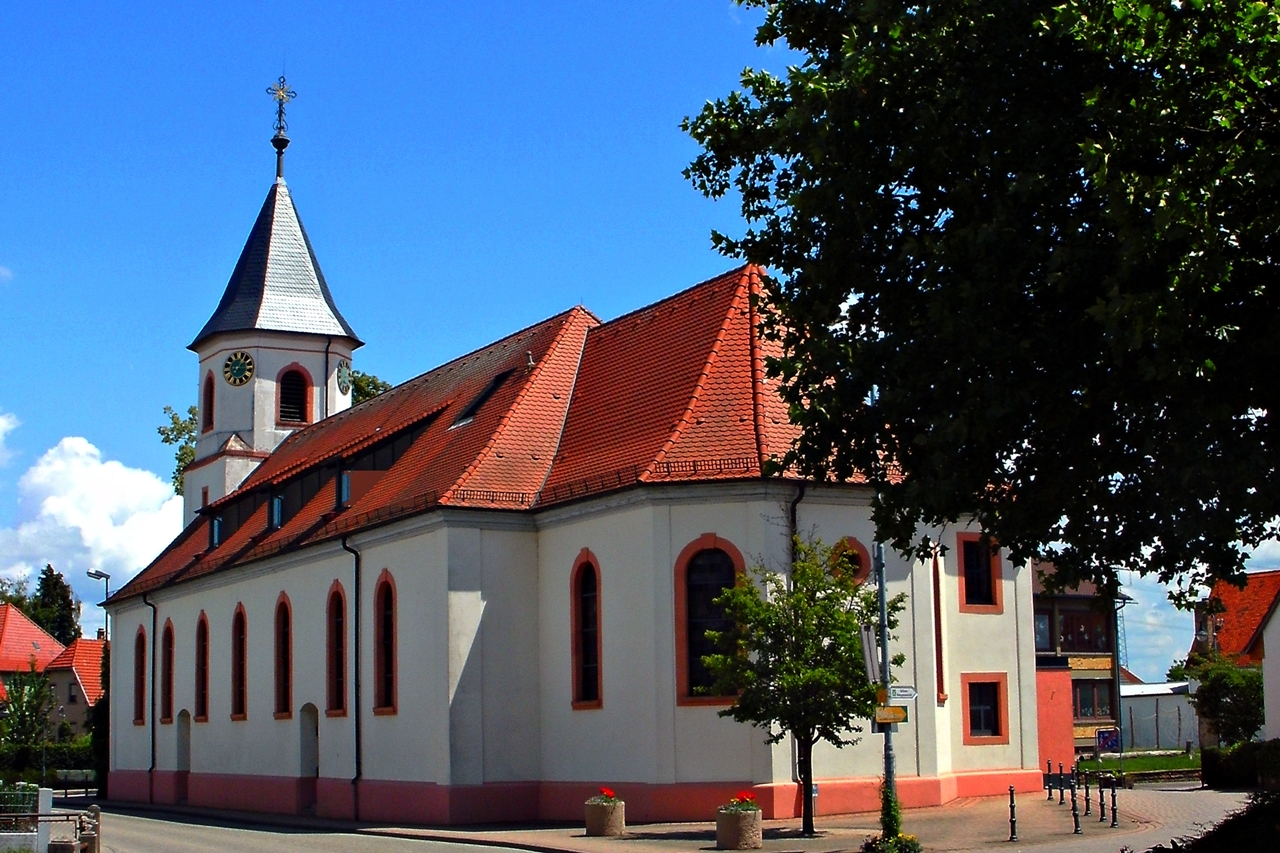
- Church in Elchesheim

- Coat of arms

- Location of Elchesheim-Illingen within Rastatt district
- Interactive map of Elchesheim-Illingen
- Location within Germany Location within Baden-Württemberg
- Coordinates: 48°55′55″N 08°12′46″E
- Country: Germany
- State: Baden-Württemberg
- Admin. region: Karlsruhe
- District: Rastatt

Government
  - Mayor (2019–27): Rolf Spiegelhalder

Area
  - Total: 10.14 km^{2} (3.92 sq mi)
- Elevation: 110 m (360 ft)

Population (2025-12-31)
  - Total: 3,252
  - Density: 320.7/km^{2} (830.6/sq mi)
- Time zone: UTC+01:00 (CET)
  - Summer (DST): UTC+02:00 (CEST)
- Postal codes: 76477
- Dialling codes: 07245
- Vehicle registration: RA
- Website: www.elchesheim-illingen.de

Elchesheim-Illingen is a village in southwestern Germany, located between Karlsruhe and Rastatt. The Rhine flows 5 km west of the village.

== Population ==
Elchesheim-Illingen has 3208 inhabitants and is 10.15 square kilometres large (including forest and countryside).

== Neighbour towns and villages ==
Elchesheim-Illingen borders on the following towns, clockwise beginning from the north: Au am Rhein, Durmersheim, Bietigheim (Baden), Steinmauern.

== Geography ==
The village is located near the river Rhine, also there are "Rheinauen", old channels of the river. In this area are many forests, also there is the Goldkanal (goldcanal), an old lake where gold was found.

The nearest big city is Karlsruhe. In the near of this region is the famous Black Forest (German: Schwarzwald). The nearest airport is the Airport Karlsruhe/Baden-Baden.

== Mayors ==
- 1971–1987: Klemens Wittmann
- 1987–2003: Kurt Hertweck
- 2003–2011: Joachim Ertl
- since 2011: Rolf Spiegelhalder
