= Kuppenheim =

- Town
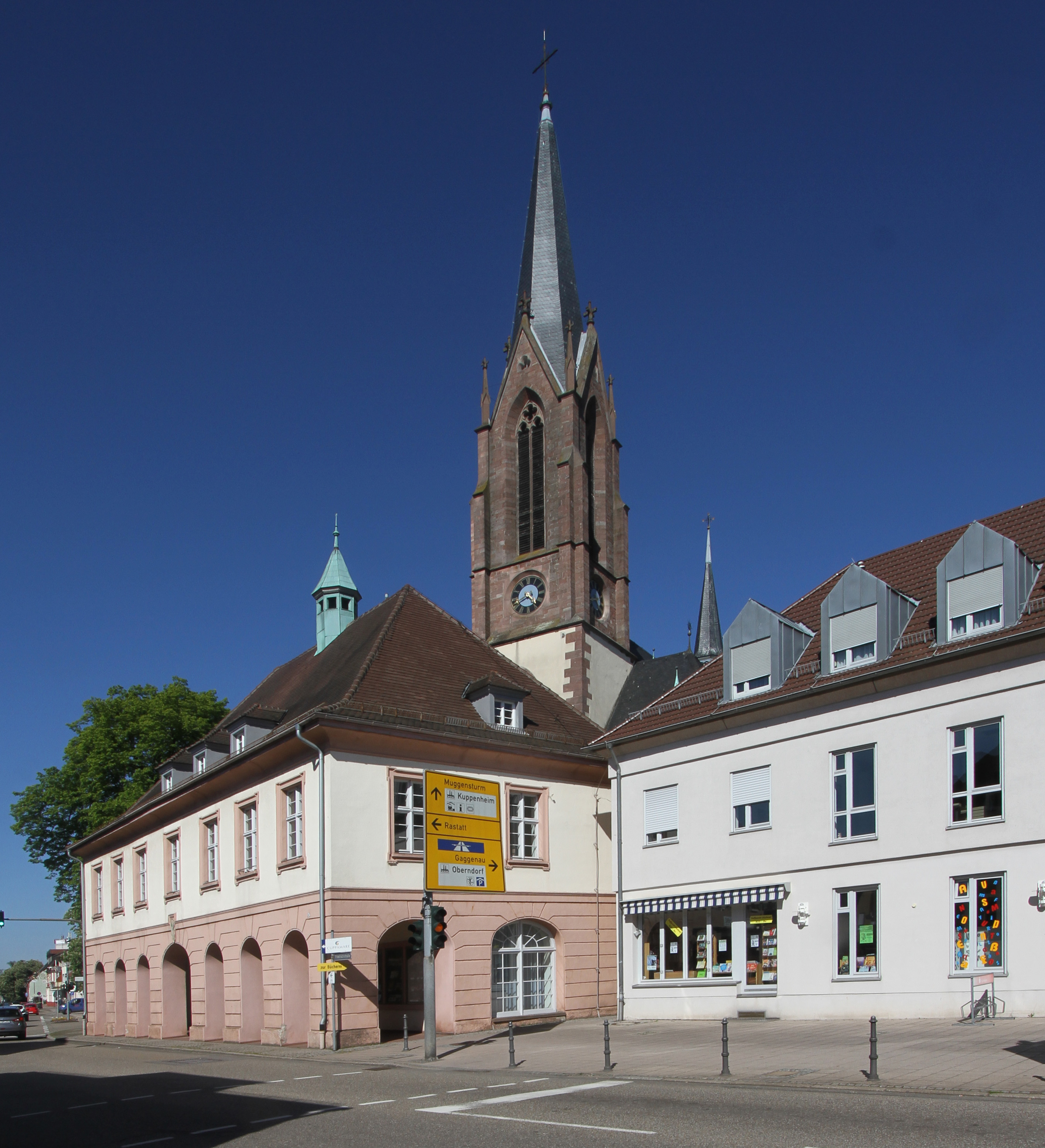
- Old town hall in front of the church of St. Sebastian

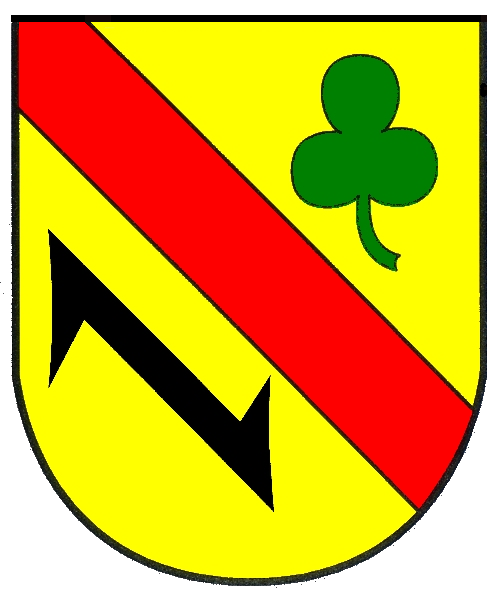
- Coat of arms

- Location of Kuppenheim within Rastatt district
- Interactive map of Kuppenheim
- Location within Germany Location within Baden-Württemberg
- Coordinates: 48°49′39″N 08°15′16″E
- Country: Germany
- State: Baden-Württemberg
- Admin. region: Karlsruhe
- District: Rastatt

Government
  - Mayor (2020–28): Karsten Mußler

Area
  - Total: 18.08 km^{2} (6.98 sq mi)
- Elevation: 127 m (417 ft)

Population (2025-12-31)
  - Total: 8,161
  - Density: 451.4/km^{2} (1,169/sq mi)
- Time zone: UTC+01:00 (CET)
  - Summer (DST): UTC+02:00 (CEST)
- Postal codes: 76456
- Dialling codes: 07222
- Vehicle registration: RA
- Website: www.kuppenheim.de

Kuppenheim (German pronunciation: [ˈkʊpn̩ˌhaɪm]) is a town in the district of Rastatt, in Baden-Württemberg, Germany. It is located on the river Murg, 5 km southeast of Rastatt, and 8 km north of Baden-Baden.

== Geography ==
=== Location ===
Kuppenheim is located at the mouth of the Murgtal River in the Northern Black Forest, and is called the "Gateway to the Murgtal" as well as "Spätzle Town". The land in the middle of the city begins to rise due to the outskirts of the Black Forest. The height differences in the Kuppenheimer district ranges from 118 m in Won "Lower Eichel Plan" to 127 m in the city center to 297 meters in the Hirschacker. In the hills of Kuppenheim you can see the cooling towers of the Philippsburg Nuclear Power Station, 50 km away, when the weather conditions are clear.

=== Neighboring Municipalities ===
Clockwise, starting from the North:

- Muggensturm
- Bischweier
- Gaggenau
- Baden-Baden, with the districts of Ebersteinburg and Haueneberstein
- Rastatt, with the districts of Förch, Niederbühl and Rauental

=== City Divisions ===
The city of Kuppenheim is divided into the core district of Kuppenheim and the district of Oberndorf. The spatial boundaries are identical to those of the former parishes of the same name. The Oberndorf district is officially named "Kuppenheim-Oberndorf".

The city of Kuppenheim lies within the core district of Kuppenheim; the village of Oberndorf lies within the district of Oberndorf. The historical "ghost towns" of Gigersberg and Fichtental are within the core district.

== City history ==
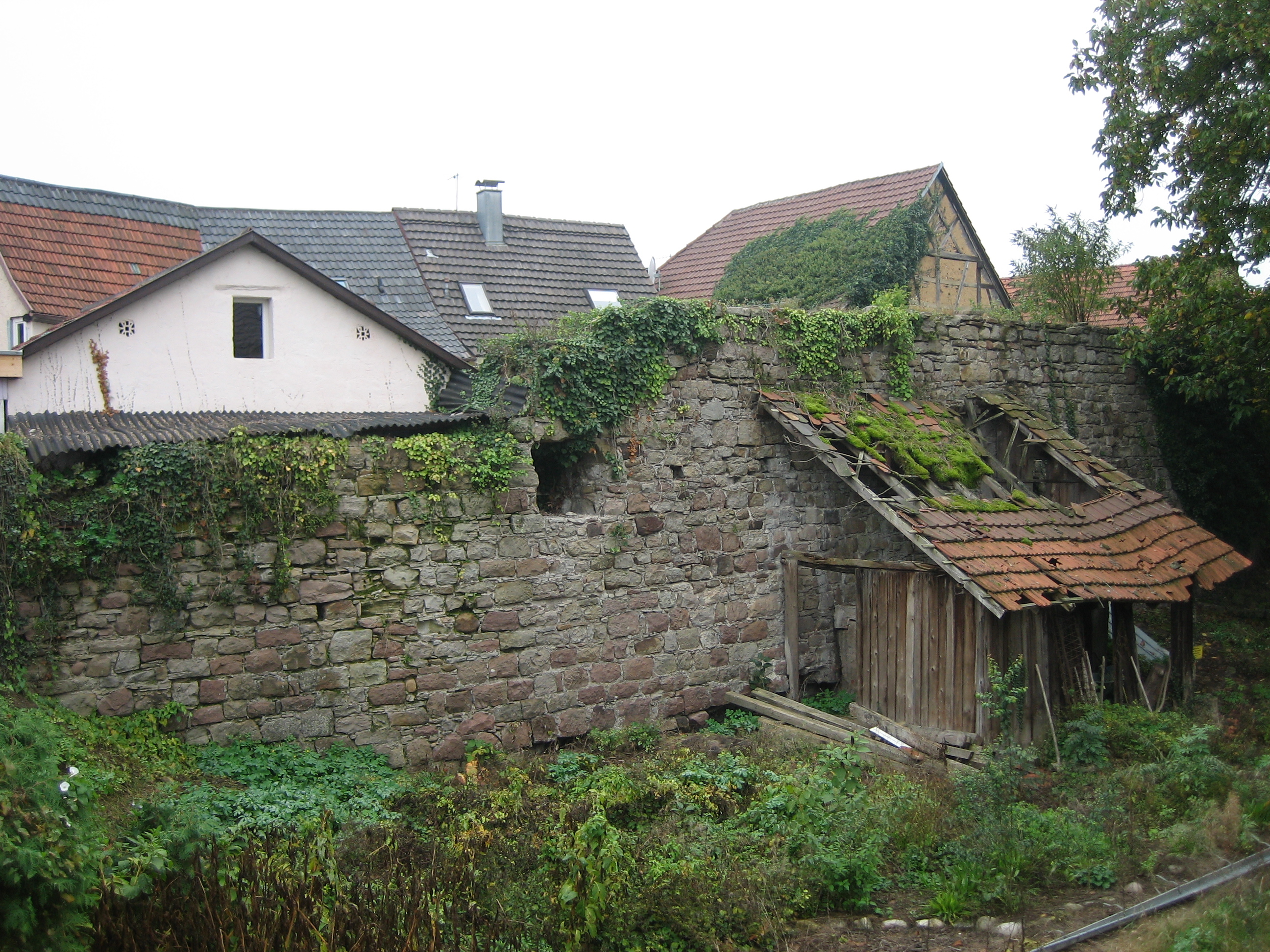
Remains of the city walls

Kuppenheim's founding date is unclear, but there was certainly a settlement from Roman Times in the district, as the foundations of a Roman Road have been found in the foothills of the Black Forest that roughly follows country route L67 to Baden-Baden.

Kuppenheim itself was first mentioned in documents around 1095. At that time it was the most important place in the Ufgau, a historical county of the Duchy of Franconia between the southern Ortenau and the northern Kraichgau. In addition, the Murg River represents the former border between the Alemannic and the southern Franconian language area. As a result, the old Kuppenheim dialect, which arose out of the Lower Alemannic dialects, includes South Rhine-Franconian language features.

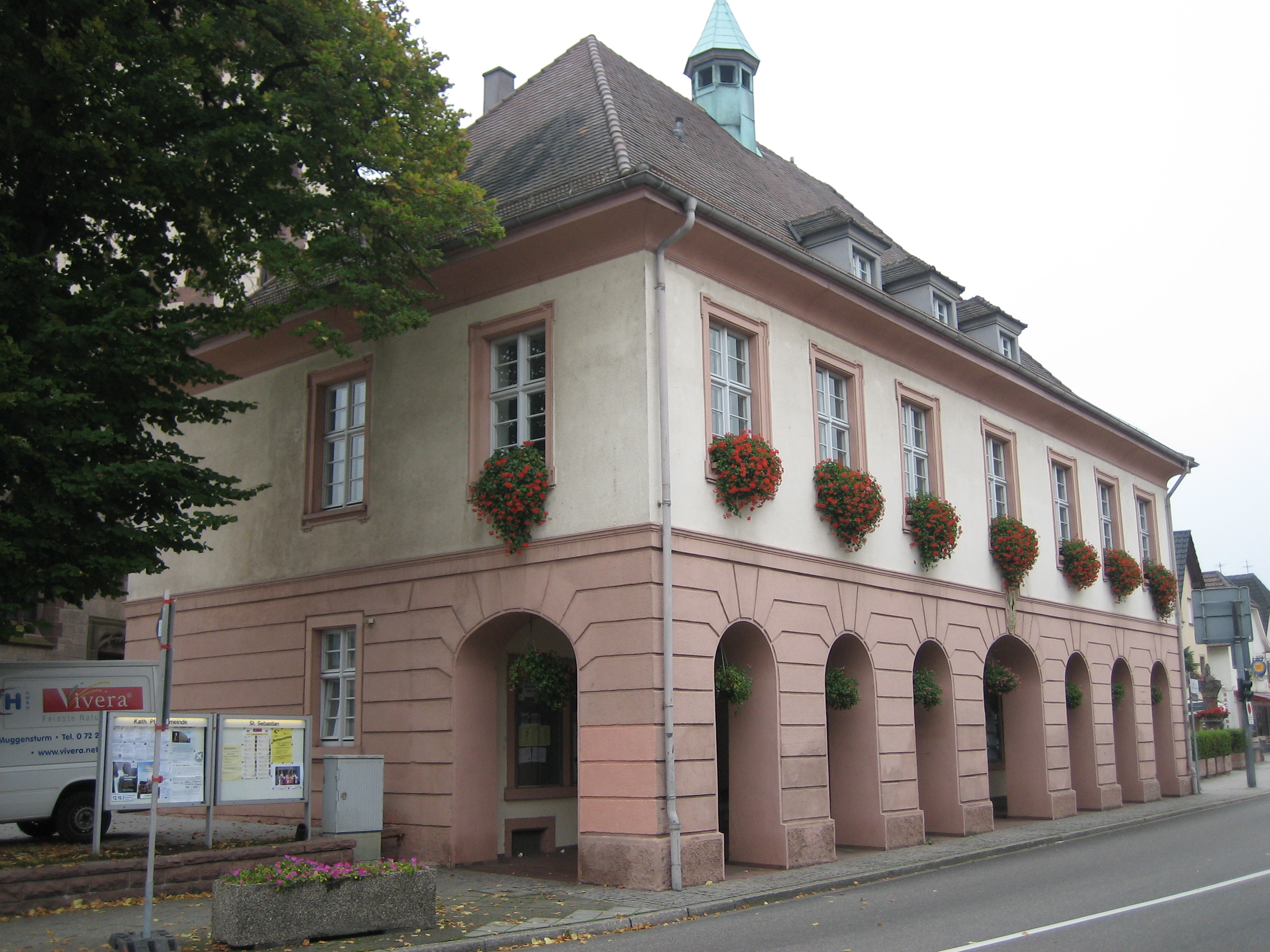
Old town hall, built in 1730. View from the north

In 1283, the city was sold to the Margraves of Baden by the Counts of Eberstein, whose power was declining, in order to address financial debts. In 1453 there was even talk of a “Kuppenheim Alliance” to which 14 villages belonged. From 1500 the city was also included in the Swabian Circle. In 1535, Kuppenheim was raised to the status of a District Council in Baden-Baden and was responsible for more than 22 villages. However, in the course of the Palatinate War of Succession, Kuppenheim was burned down "except for one house" in 1689 and thus lost its status as District Council. This status then went to the resident city of the Margraviate of Baden-Baden, Rastatt. After a slow reconstruction at the beginning of the 18th century, Kuppenheim grew beyond the bounds of its city wall. Most of the fortifications were razed at the beginning of the 19th century, with only parts of the city wall left preserved. At that time, the pastor was Rector Franz Joseph Herr in Kuppenheim, an important clergyman who had both the city church and the Antonius chapel renovated or rebuilt. Herr, presumably an illegitimate descendant of Charles Frederick, Grand Duke of Baden, is an honorary citizen of the city of Kuppenheim.

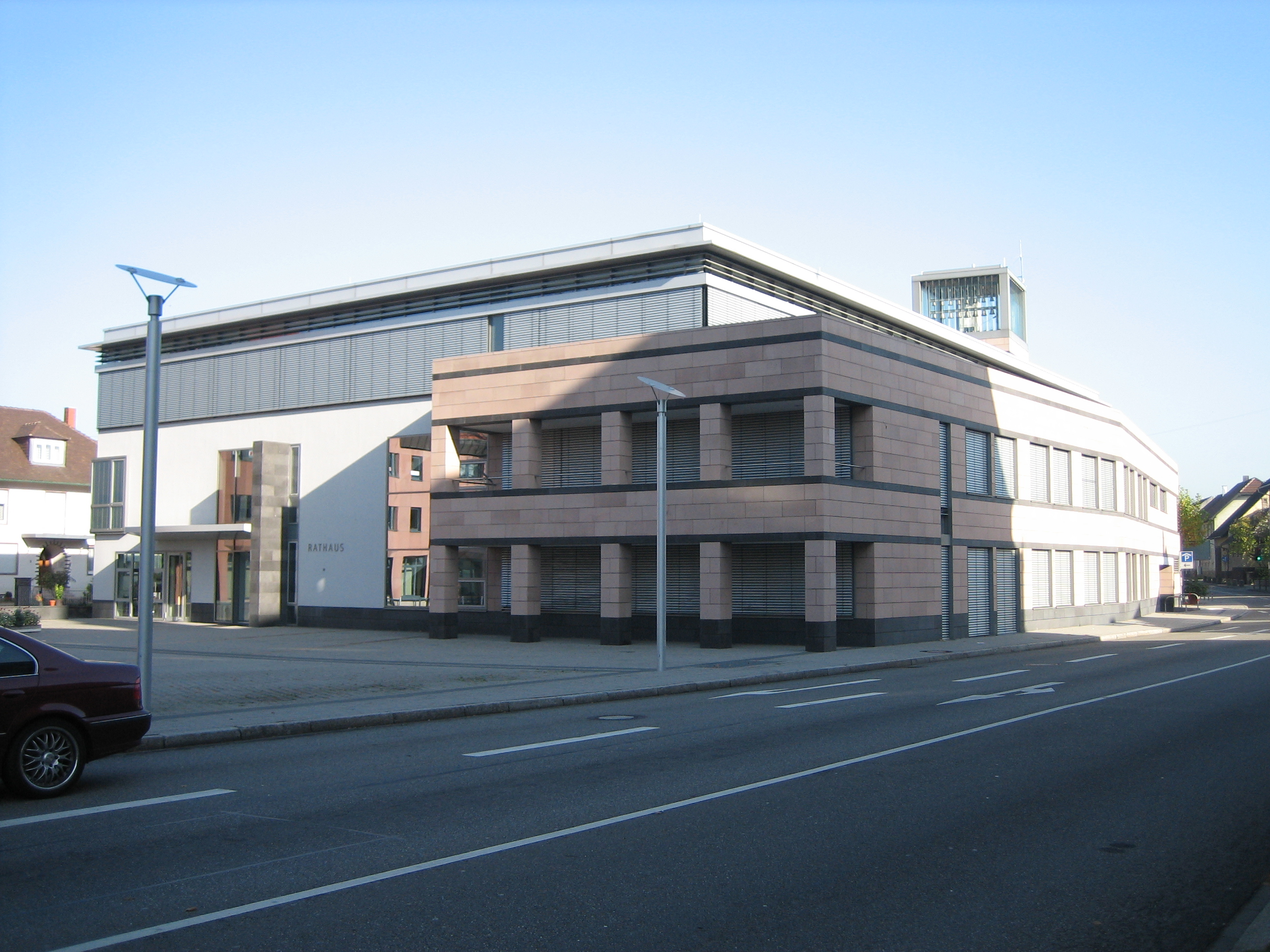
The new town hall on Friedensplatz (Peace Plaza)

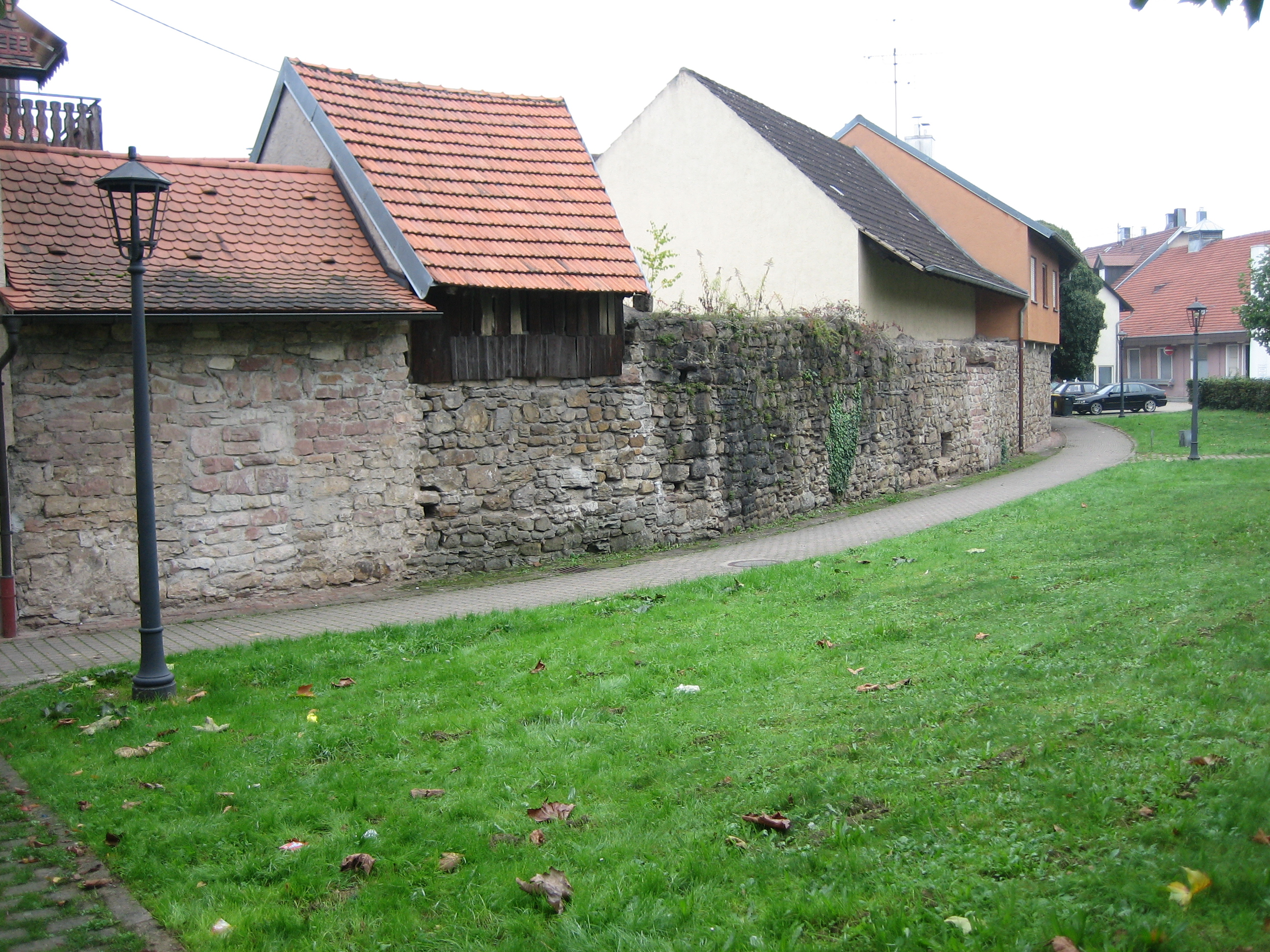
Oxen path along the city wall

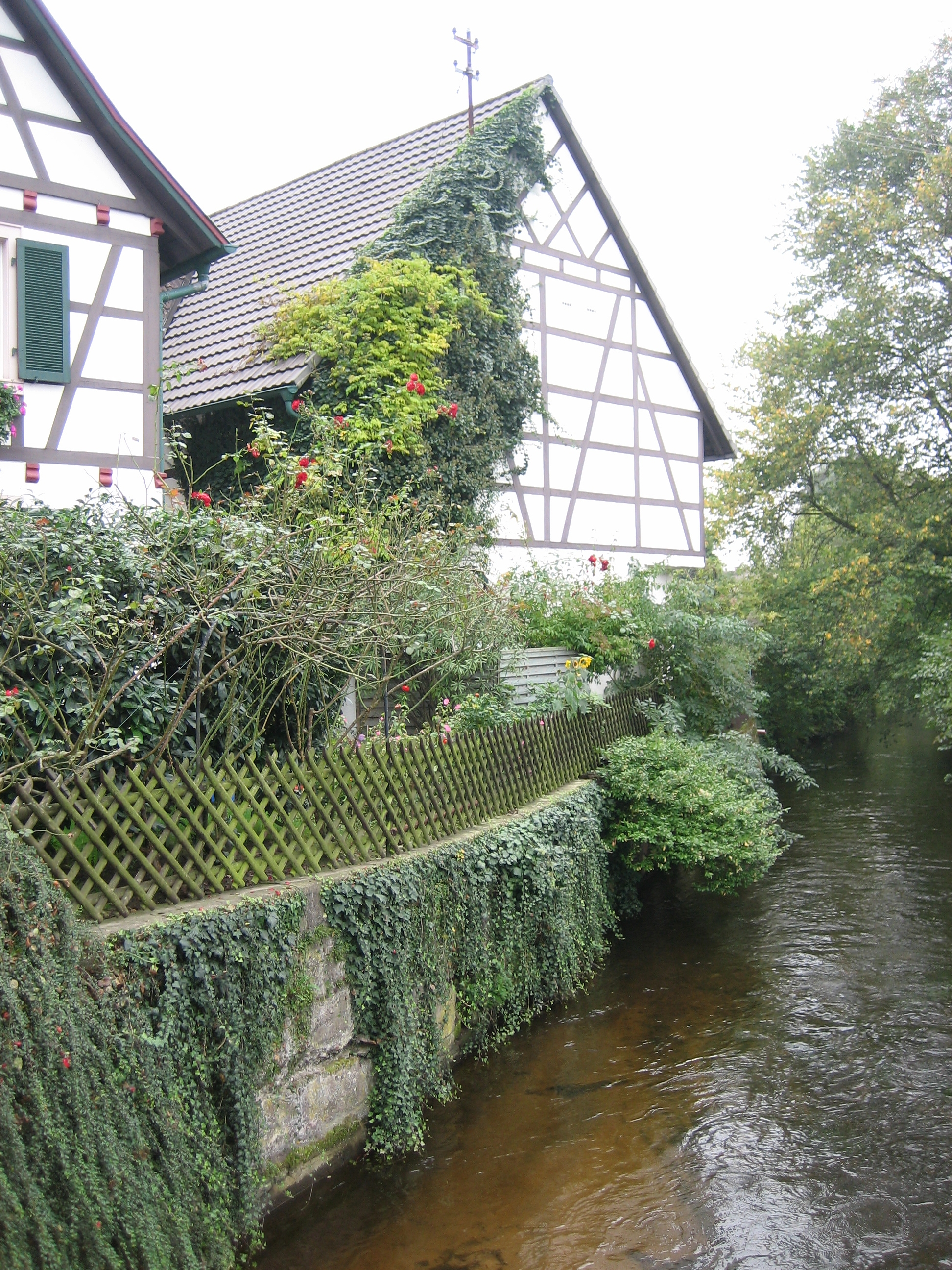
Mill Canal along Friedrichstrasse (Friedrich Street)

In the course of the Baden Revolution, a battle took place between local militia and the Prussian intervention forces in 1849. The Prussian military was stationed in Kuppenheim as part of the siege against the federal fortress seized by revolutionaries at Rastatt.

After many Kuppenheimers had died in the First World War, the depression of the 1920s hit the city hard. To make matters worse, Kuppenheim was in the demilitarized zone. Many citizens therefore emigrated to the United States during this time. (As a side note, one emigrant from Kuppenheim who emigrated to the United States in 1850 built a large US clothier company in the late 19th century that bore the name "Kuppenheimer".)

The period of National Socialism did not leave Kuppenheim untouched. The loss of city autonomy in 1935 weighed heavily on the city. The courageous city pastor Heinrich Geiler, another honorary citizen of the city, spoke out against the Nazi regime beyond his pulpit and his church gazette, both before and after the Machtergreifung in which Nazis seized power, despite great personal risk. A street was later named after him for his courage.

Despite the above, Kuppenheim survived the Second World War relatively unscathed.

In 1950, Kuppenheim was again granted city rights by the then President of the State of South Baden, Leo Wohleb.

=== The Legend of "Spätzle Town" ===
In the Thirty Years' War the name “Spätzle Town”, the most famous nickname of Kuppenheim, came into being. According to legend, Kuppenheim was besieged at the time by the Swedes and, as the food supplies were slowly running out, a decision was made to execute a deception: everyone should collect all the flour and eggs in order to cook "Knöpfle", a kind of Spätzle. These were then thrown over the city walls to make the enemy think the town still had plenty of food supplies left. The Swedes broke off the supposedly unsuccessful siege and Kuppenheim was saved.

=== The History of the Jewish Community in Kuppenheim ===
The first evidence of Jewish life in Kuppenheim dates back to the early 15th century.

The first mention of a synagogue dates back to the year 1714, so the first and oldest synagogue in today's Rastatt district was probably in Kuppenheim. In 1826, a Jewish school building was built next to the synagogue, which also included two women's baths.

During the November pogroms in 1938 ("Kristallnacht"), the Kuppenheim synagogue was burned down. The rubble was removed only years later. In the early 1940s, the last Jews in Kuppenheim were deported from the city to the Nazi Gurs assembly camp and, later, to the Auschwitz concentration camp. None of the deported Kuppenheim Jews survived.

Kuppenheim's Jewish cemetery was first mentioned in writing in 1694. As is customary for Jewish cemeteries, this too had to be set up at a distance from the town, in this case on the Mergelberg, directly above today's Schützenhaus. Jews from all over Central Baden and beyond were buried in this cemetery. During the 1938 pogroms, a number of tombstones were knocked over by the Nazis, but the turmoil of war prevented the Nazis from completely destroying this valuable burial site and it was preserved for posterity.

Pictures from the Kuppenheim Jewish Cemetery

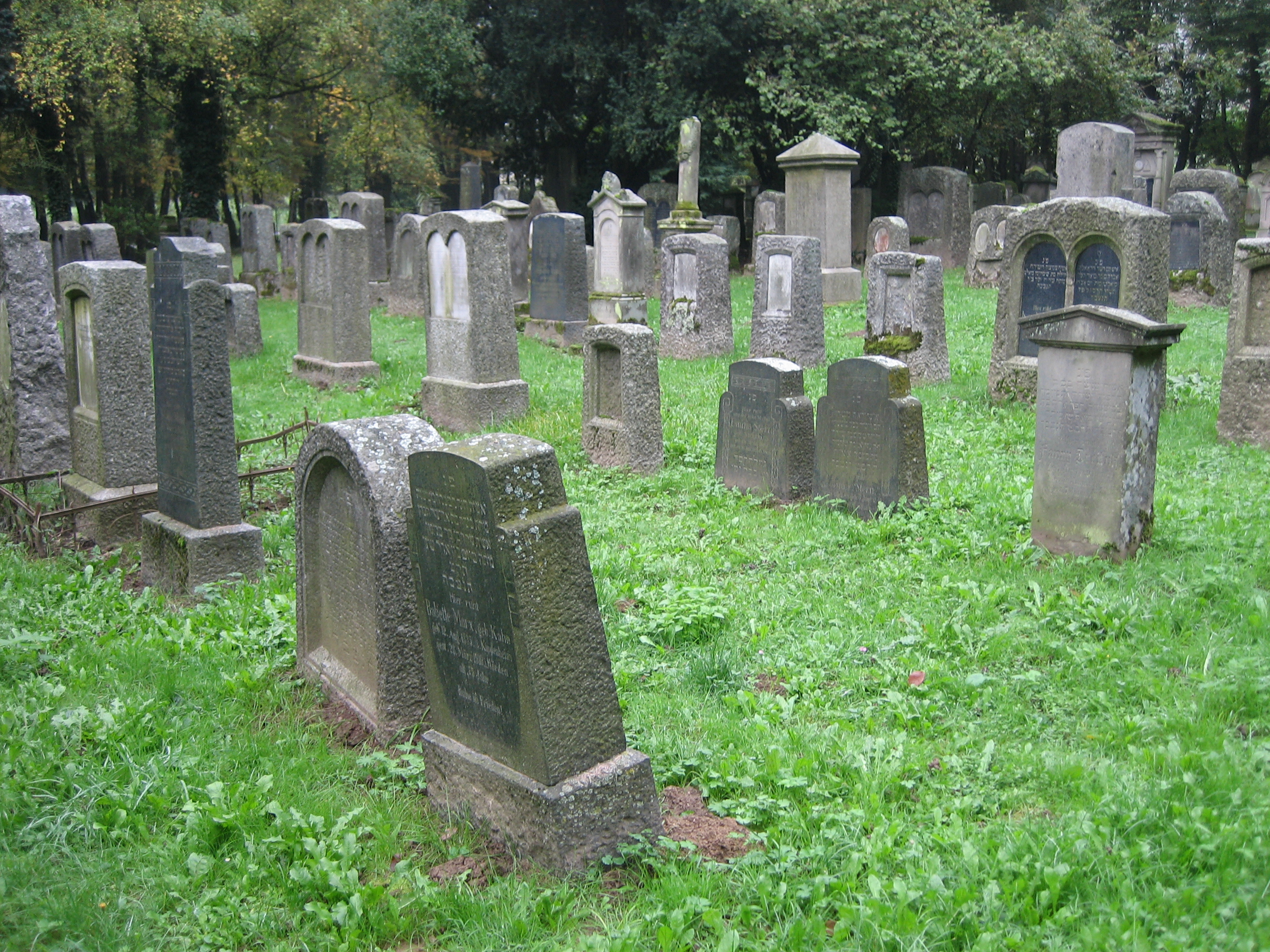

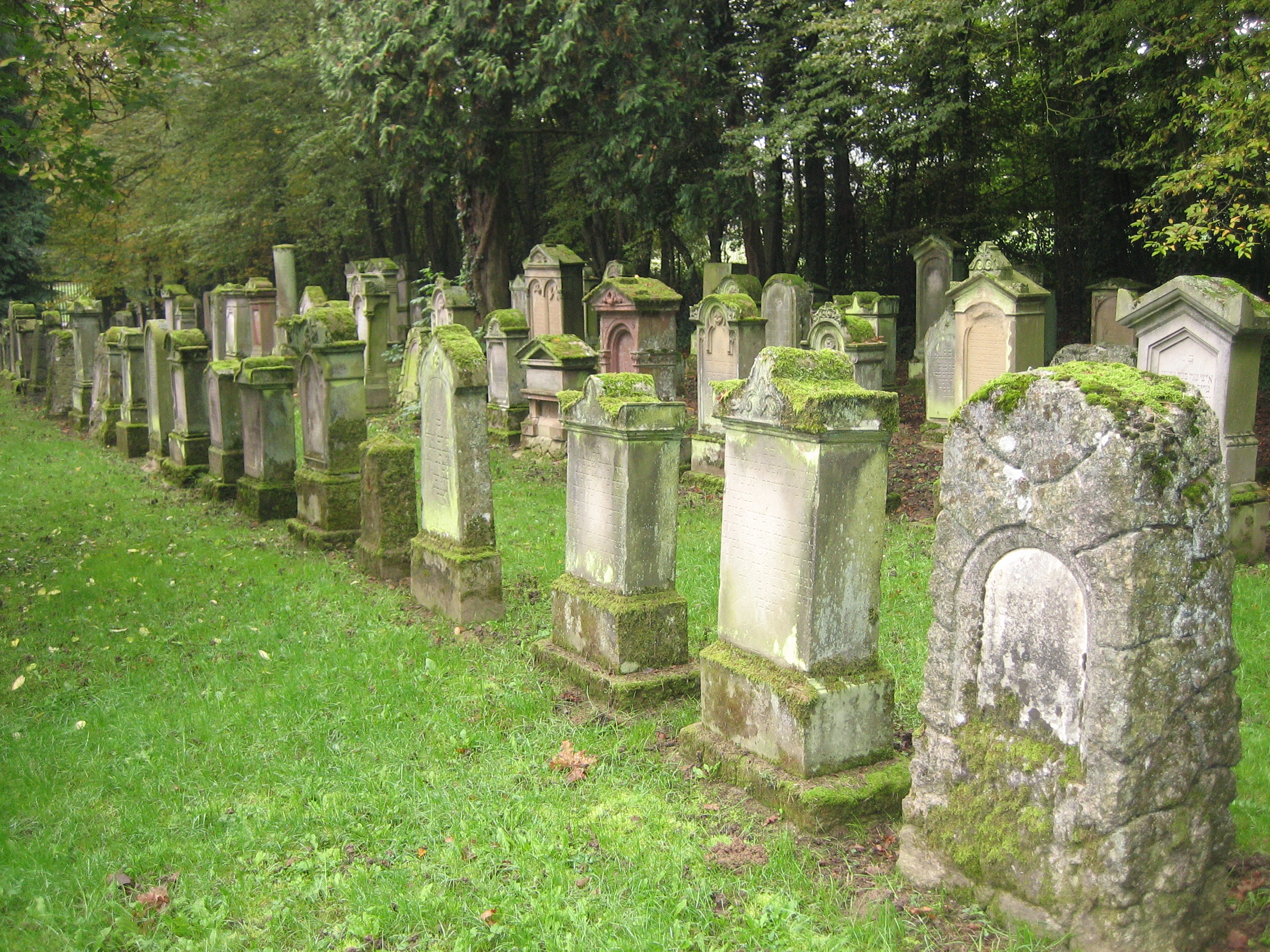

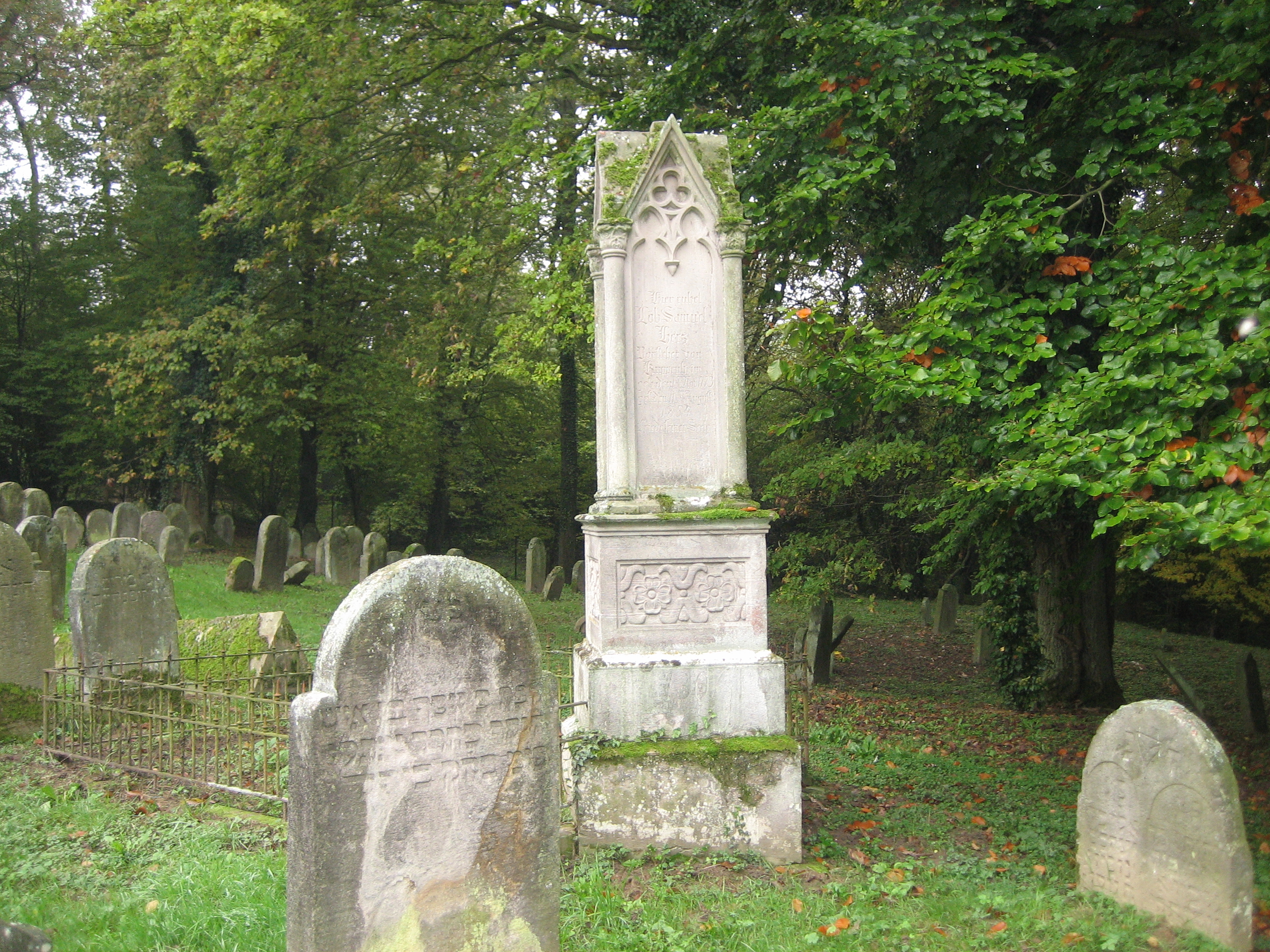

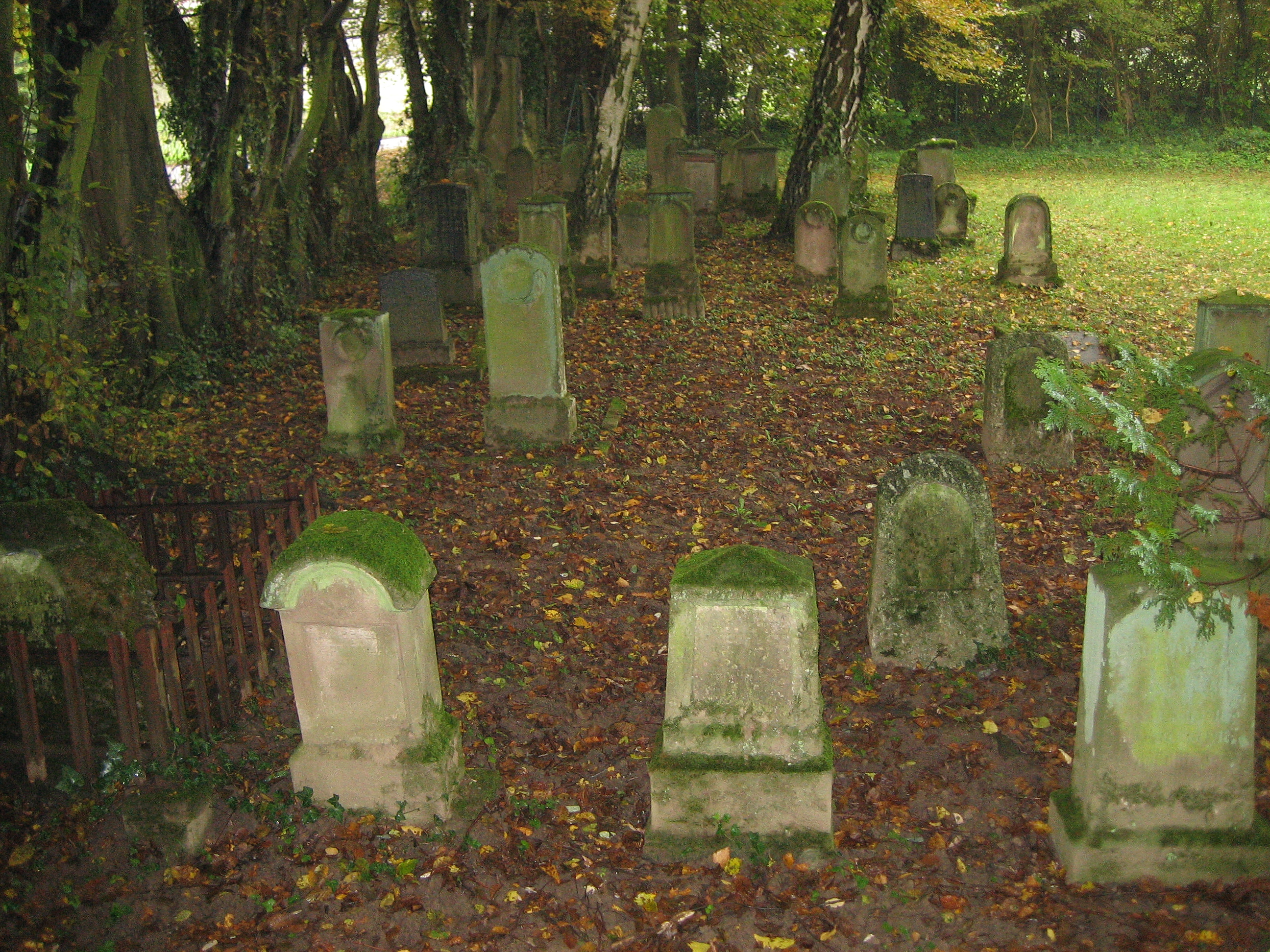

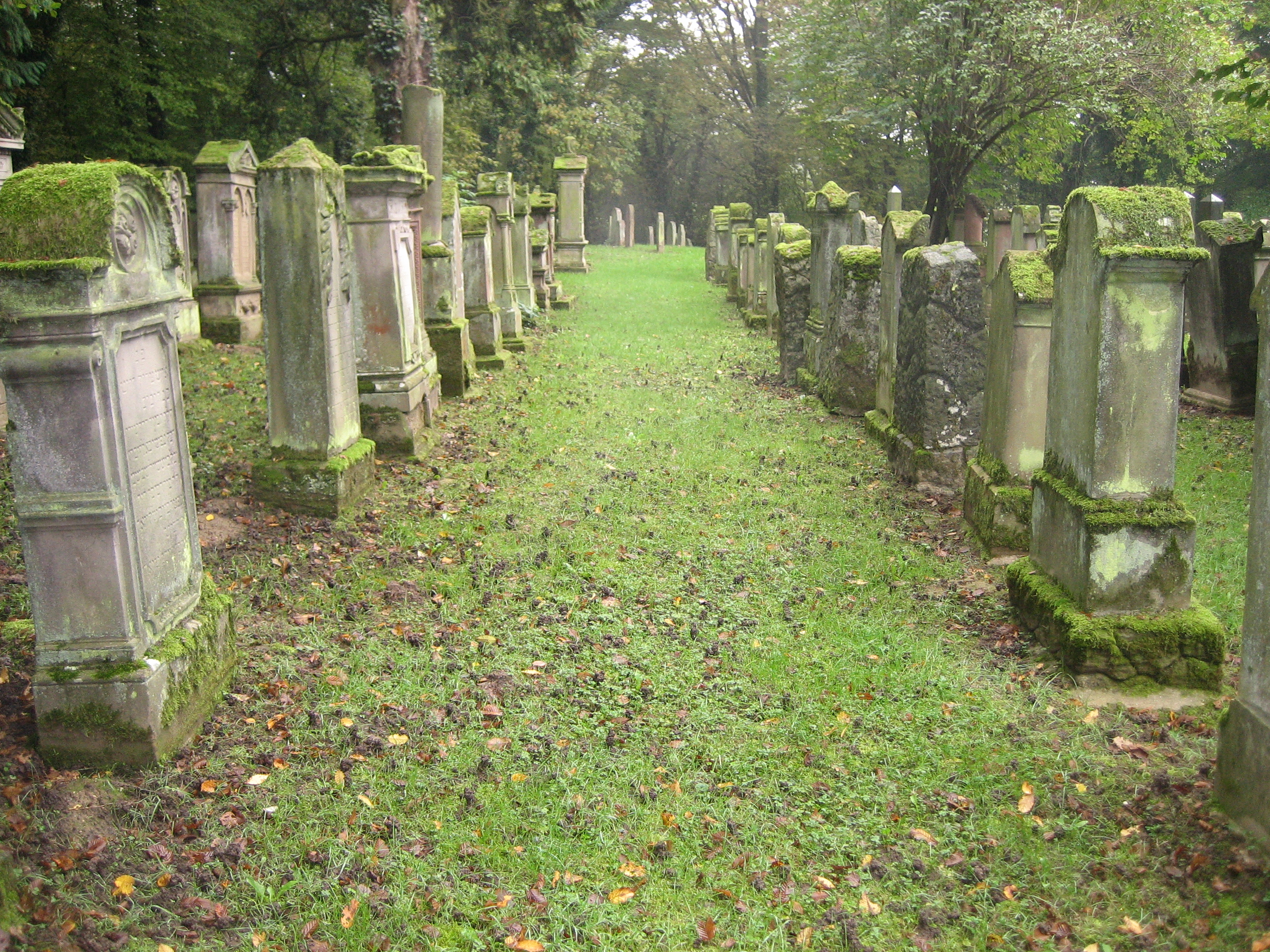

=== Municipal Incorporations ===
Oberndorf

Since 1 January 1971, the village of Oberndorf (Upper Village), which was first documented in 1288, has been a district of Kuppenheim.

== Politics ==
=== Local Council ===
The 26 May 2019 local elections in Baden-Württemberg led to the following distribution of the 18 seats of the local council among the individual groups:

Party / List	Seats	+/−
CDU	6	− 1
SPD	4	− 1
GRN	1	± 0
FW	7	+ 2

=== Mayor ===
Before 1831, the office of Mayor was called "Stabhalter" (Steward).

- 1832–1838: Marzell Warth
- 1838–1839: Wolfgang Jüngling
- 1839–1844: Karl Bernard
- 1844–1849: Lukas Müller
- 1852–1861: Anton Walz
- 1861–1875: Franz Tobias Hertweck
- 1875–1882: Hermann Bernard
- 1882–1887: Fidel Niedereder
- 1887–1899: Sebastian Walz
- 1899–1908: Lorenz Stemmle
- 1908–1922: Ignaz Walz
- 1923–1945: Gustav Grathwohl
- 1945–1946: Karl Feistkorn
- 1946: Stefan Nunn
- 1946–1948: Rochus Dörrer
- 1949–1968: Adolf Walz
- 1968–1979: Alfred Bachofer
- 1980–2004: Werner Trauthwein
- since 2004: Karsten Mußler

=== Coat of Arms ===
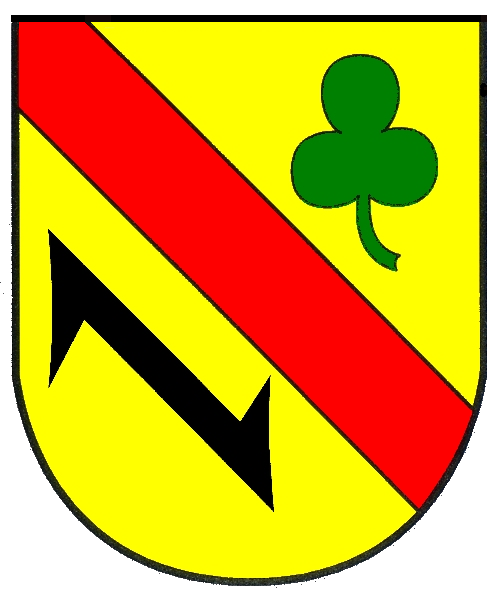
Kuppenheim Coat of Arms

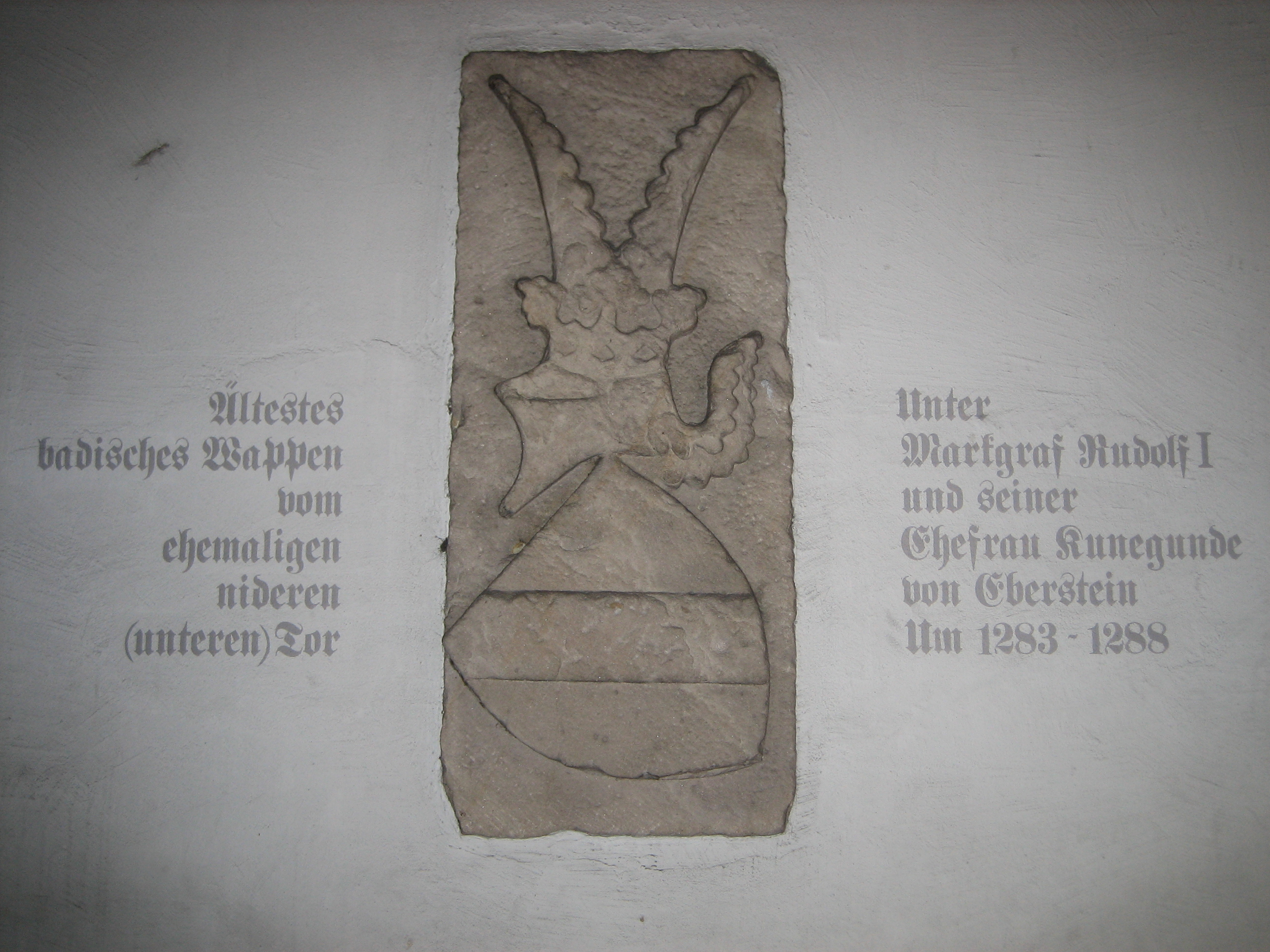
Oldest Kuppenheim coat of arms, carved in stone

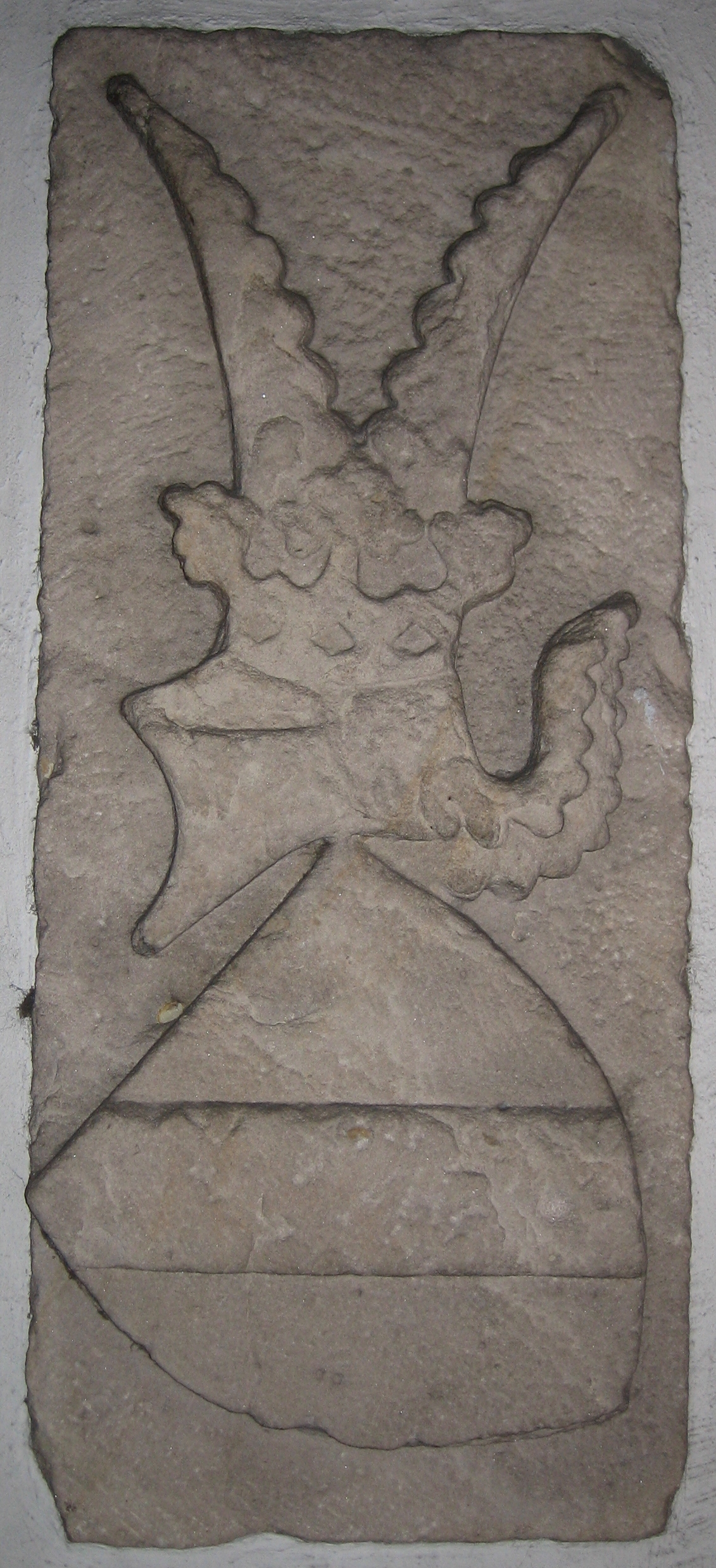
Close up

The Kuppenheim Coat of Arms consists of the typical Baden golden state coat of arms with a red diagonal bar. In the upper field there is a cloverleaf, which represents a stylized cross, standing for the Dean's office in Kuppenheim. In the lower field there is a raft hook, a sign that the rafting trade was also based in Kuppenheim.

The oldest Baden coat of arms carved out of stone is located at the Friedrichstraße 68 estate. At this point one of the original four city gates stood, all of which were demolished in 1813.

=== Sister City ===
Kuppenheim has been a "Sister City" with the French city of Raon-l'Étape since 1986. In 2001, a friendship contract was signed with the Italian municipality of Filottrano.

== Culture and Sights ==
=== Museum ===
The local museum is located in the old school on Murgtalstraße.

=== Music ===
Kuppenheim has a music association, a harmonica association, two singing associations (with Oberndorf) and the initiative group Kulturpflege Kuppenheim (IKK).

=== Historic Buildings ===
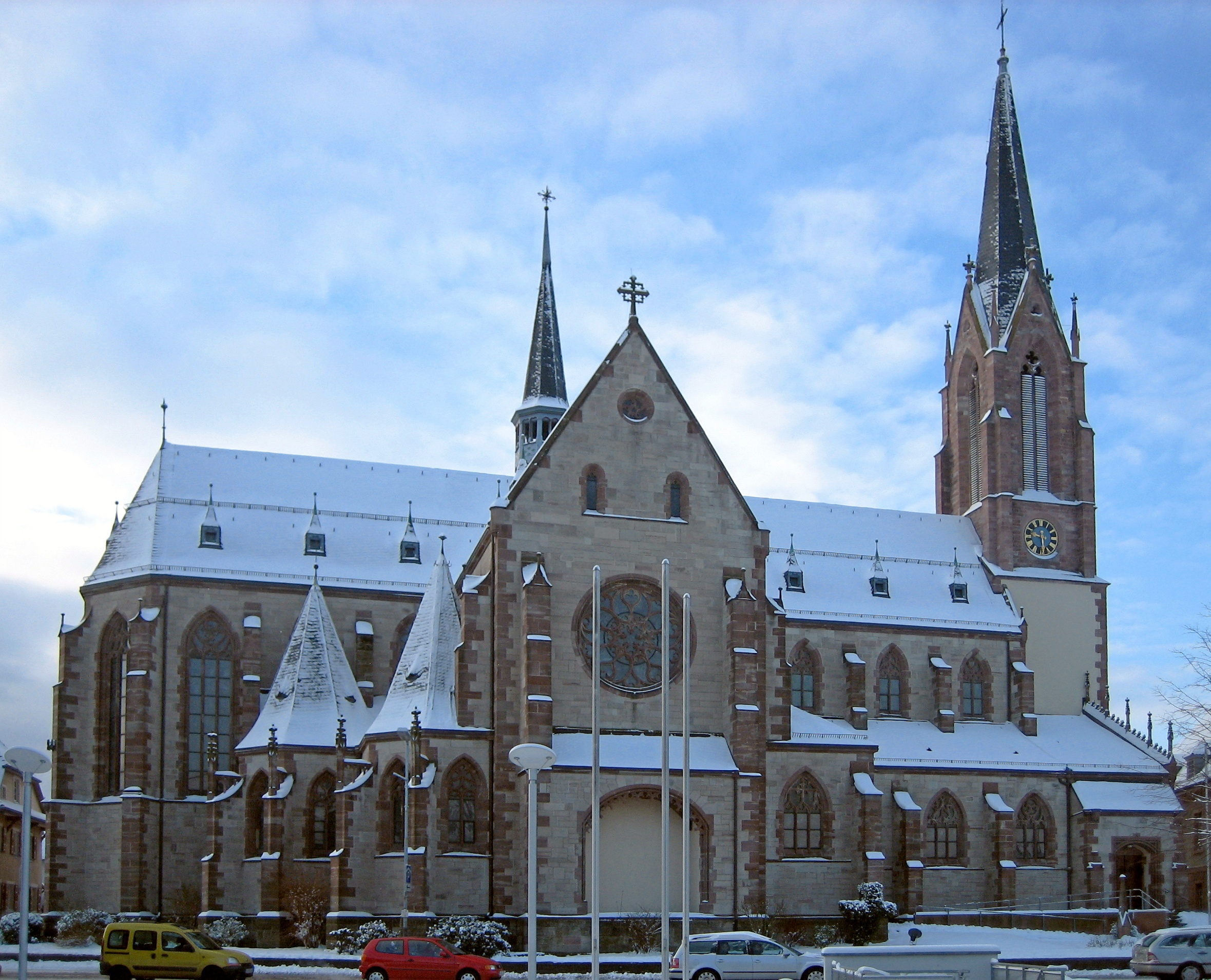
St. Sebastian City Church

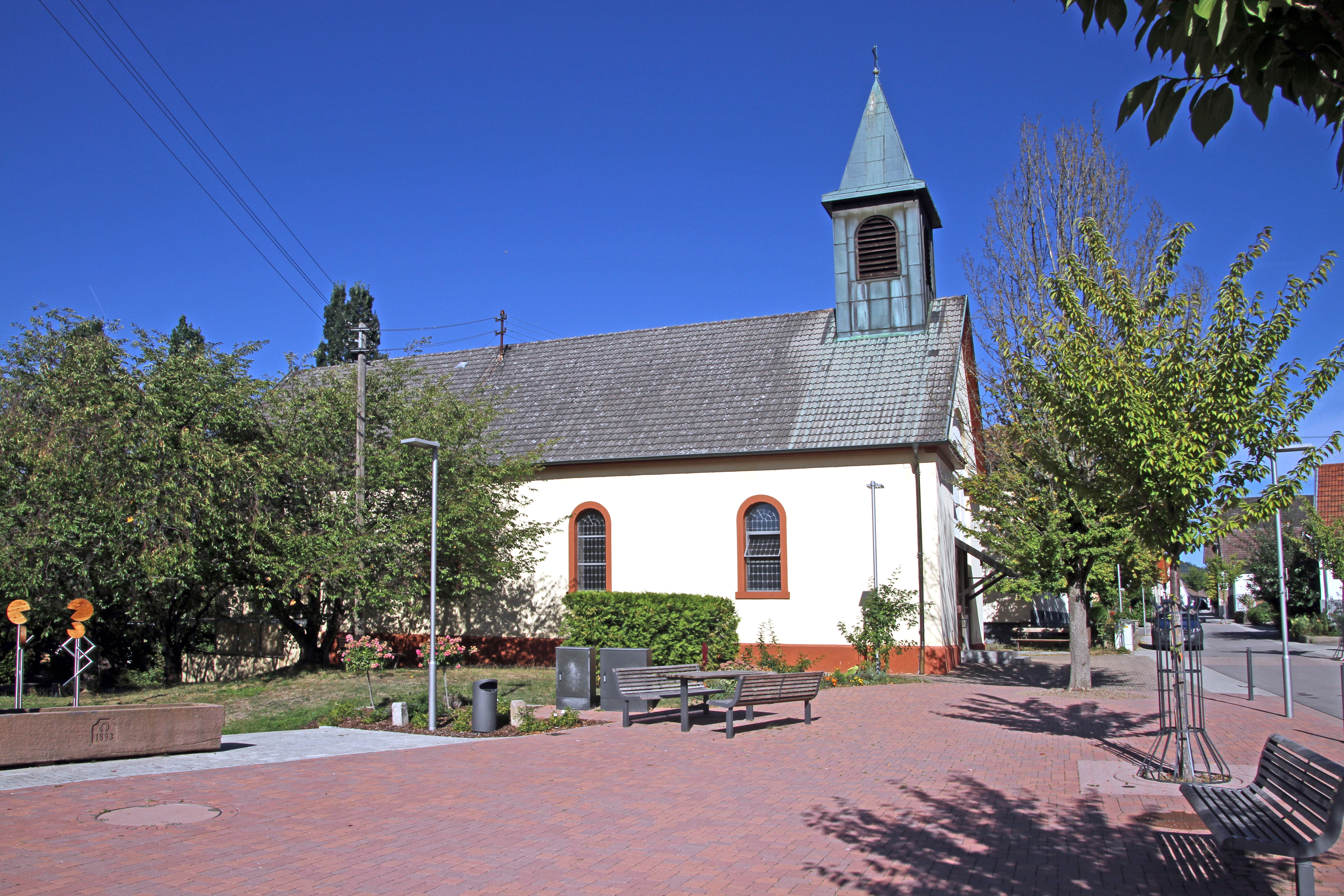
Holy Cross Church in the Oberndorf district

Interesting or striking buildings of the city are:

- The neo-Gothic city church of St. Sebastian was built in 1902–1905, including the older bell tower, according to plans by the Karlsruhe architect Johannes Schroth.
- In front of it is the old town hall from the 18th century.
- The city wall surrounds the narrow streets of the old town.
- Jewish cemetery (Guided tours possible)
- Holy Cross Church in the Oberndorf district
- Cuppamare indoor swimming pool
- The new town hall on the newly designed Friedensplatz (Peace Plaza)

Favorite Castle and its park are only a few hundred meters from the edge of Kuppenheim, but it is owned by the District of Rastatt.

=== Nature ===
Almost two thirds of the Kuppenheim district lie in the foothills of the Black Forest. The city forest with its valleys and hills can be hiked on numerous paths, including up to the Alt-Eberstein castle ruin.

=== Sports ===
The city of Kuppenheim has its own Sports and Recreation facility, in which, among other things, the South Baden Association League (SV) / Kuppenheim (soccer) has its training facility. This facility also includes a tennis court, a handball hall, the Cuppamare and the "Soccer Palace" indoor soccer facility.

The most significant sports clubs in the city:

- The "Kuppenheim MSC Pumas", founded in 1960, won its tenth German Motoball Championship in 2010.
- The "Rochade Kuppenheim Chess Club" was founded in 1979. Three teams play for the strongest amateur chess club within the "Golden Chess Triangle" of Baden-Baden, Rastatt and Karlsruhe, ranked first in the League.
- The soccer club SV Kuppenheim (mentioned above), founded in 1908, plays in the Association League.
- The 1985 Kuppenheim Volleyball Club e.V. offers volleyball for all ages: women, men, mixed competition, mixed leisure and youth.
- The 1863 Kuppenheim Schützengilde e.V. (Rifle Guild) offers sport shooting in the air rifle and small bore disciplines. The first air rifle team is a member of the South Baden League of the South Baden Sports Shooters Association.

=== Other City Events ===
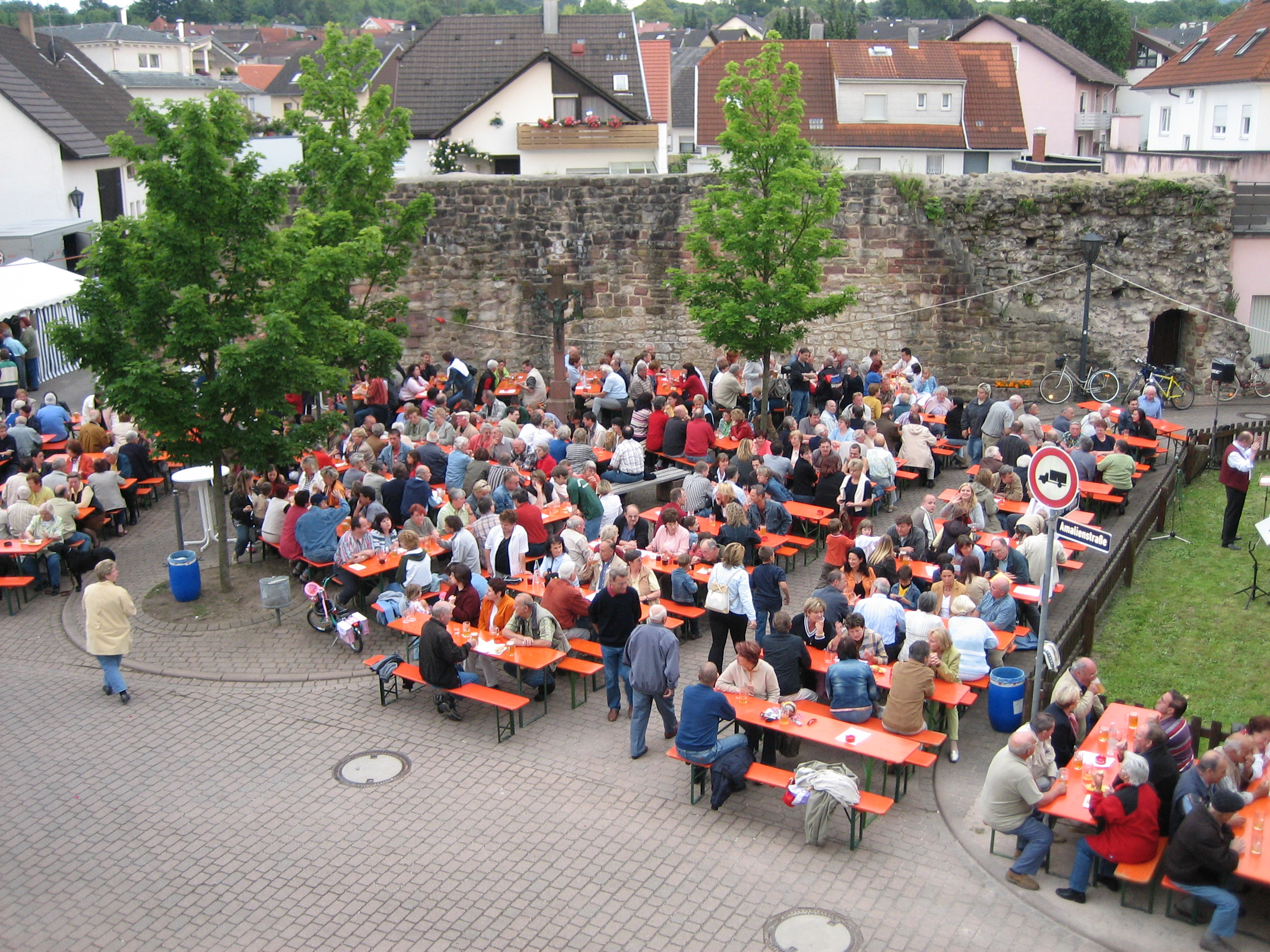
Event in front of the city wall at Oberen Torplatz

- The town fair takes place on the first weekend in May and October.
- Since 2004 on Sundays during the town fair, there has also been a trade show for local companies from Kuppenheim and the region in the school yard and in the sports hall of the Schloss Favorite (Rastatt), in which up to 50 companies take part.

== Regional Customs ==
=== 'S Riedelwiebel ===
An old Oberndorf legend exists of a forest woman named Riedelwiebel. To young children, people would say: "Don't go to Riedel, else Riedelwiebel will get you!" Riedelwiebel was a witch in the Riedel Valley (forest between Oberndorf and Kuppenheim) who allegedly guarded a golden calf buried at the highest elevation, called "Heidenburg".

=== Pentecostal ===
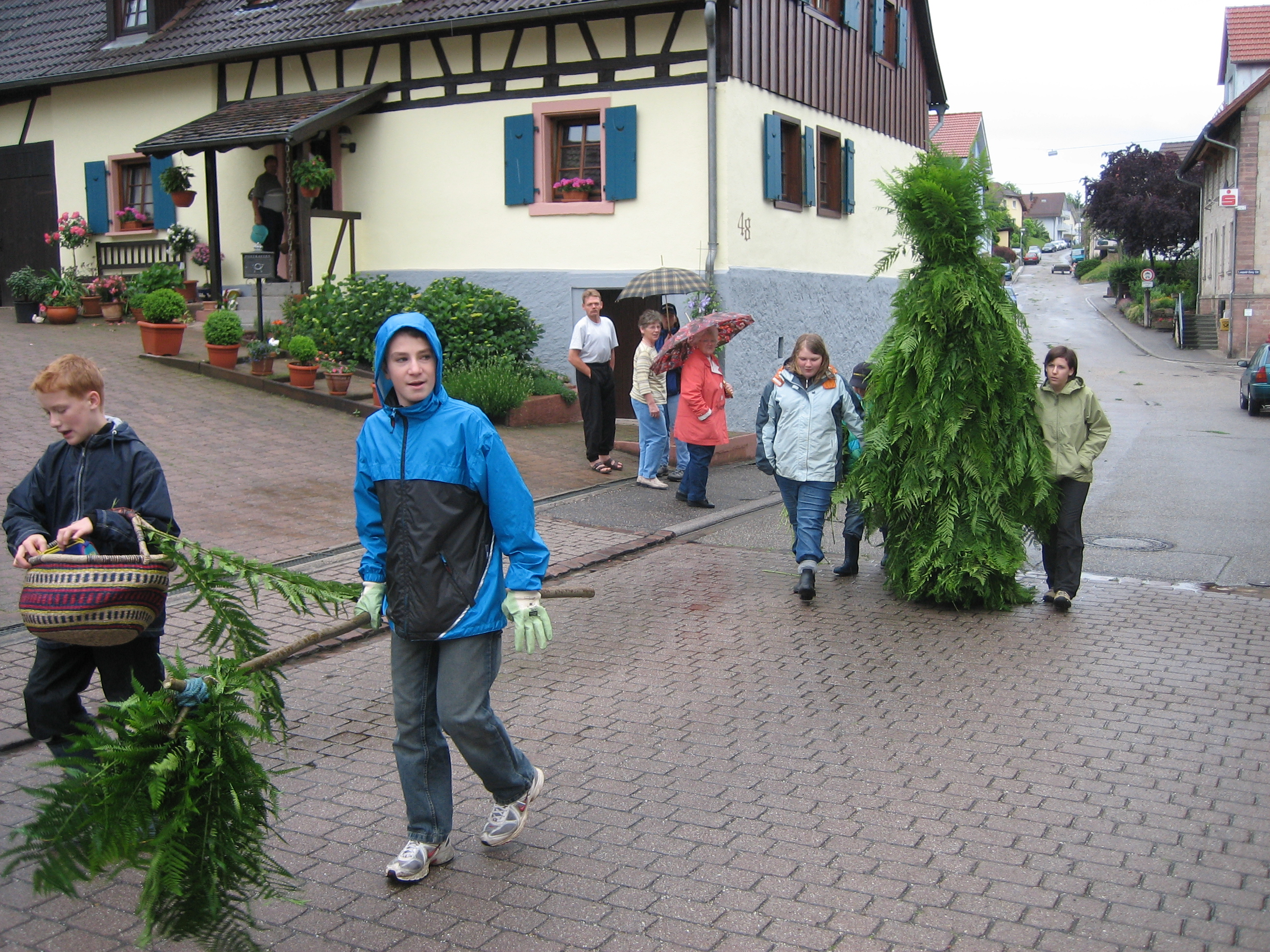
Pentecostal

Originally native to the entire Rastatt district, this custom has only survived in the Oberndorf district. It goes back to the legend of the Pentecostal king and queen, who were accompanied by the Pentecost bearer: A lazy and pea-loving companion who, because of the greed for the green legumes, always appeared too late for the royal couple to move in and who always forgot his horse. Therefore, the mocking of him goes:

Pentecostal, Pentecostal, oha!

He has eaten peas,

and left his horse in the stable!

Every Pentecost Monday, an older boy is selected as the Pentecost bearer who is taken to the forest and is there so densely covered with ferns and willows that he is unrecognizable and can hardly walk. The ferns are collected by the so-called dividers, made up of boys who took part in the Pentecostal ritual in the previous year. The bearer's costume includes a tail about 6 feet long, which is carried by the younger boys. He is led into the village while singing the taunt. He is preceded by a boy who carries a bell on a long stick who thus announces the Pentecost. The dividers collect small gifts from the residents. At the end, the Pentecostal bearer is led back into the forest and relieved of his costume.

== Economy and Infrastructure ==
Starting around 1850, Kuppenheim experienced a pre-industrial economic boom. The community evolved from a farming village to a modern city through various medium-sized companies: For example, until the post-war period, Kuppenheim was known as the "Badenese Suitcase-City" because of the Schaeuble suitcase factory, which no longer exists today. Other similar companies followed later. Being situated in the technology region of Karlsruhe, between the automobile cities of Rastatt and Gaggenau and the Baden-Baden spa, was a significant factor to this.

From the 1980s, the industrial areas were greatly expanded, so that they now occupy more than a third of the total built-up area of the core city.

=== Traffic ===
==== Rail Transport ====
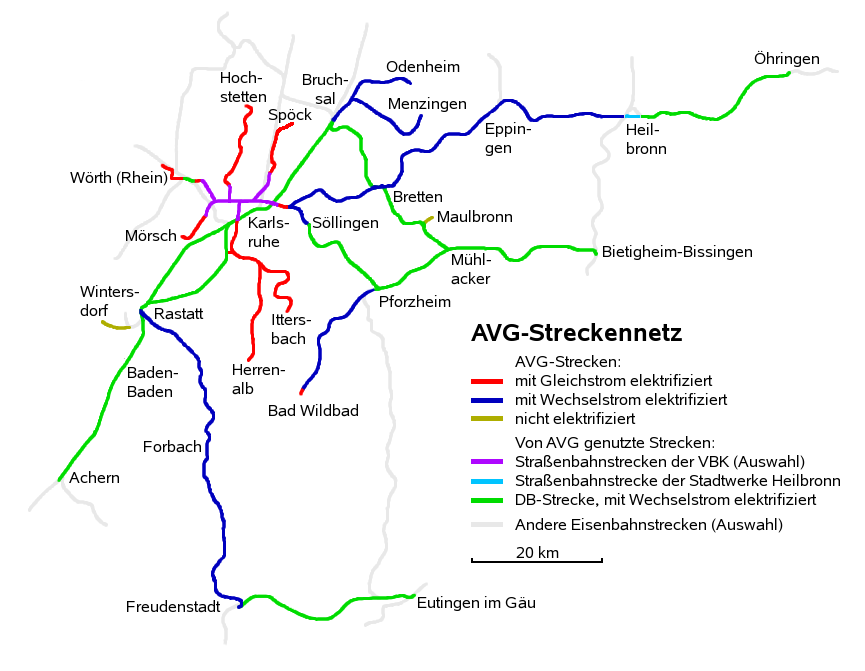
Karlsruhe Stadtbahn Route Map

Kuppenheim has a train station on the double-track section of the Kuppenheim–Bad Rotenfels section of the Murgtalbahn, on which, after electrification from 2000 to 2004, the S8 and S81 lines of the Karlsruhe Stadtbahn operated by the AVG operates and connects to Rastatt without changing trains, Karlsruhe, Bruchsal, Menzingen, Odenheim, Gaggenau, Gernsbach, Forbach (Black Forest), Freudenstadt and Eutingen im Gäu station. The S8 runs every hour from the Albtalbahnhof as a tram to Karlsruhe city center and the S81 line to Karlsruhe Central Station in the same rhythm.

From the end of July to mid-October, the "Murgtäler" Radexpress stops in Kuppenheim on its journey from Ludwigshafen via Mannheim, Heidelberg and Karlsruhe to Freudenstadt.

The bistro on the platform (Bistro am Bahnsteig) is now in the rather stately station building of the Kuppenheim station, which was still used by the Deutsche Bahn when the Stadtbahn opened on the Murgtalbahn.

==== Bus Transport ====
From the Kuppenheim train station, buses of line 243, which are operated by Südwestbus, run directly to Baden-Baden and Augustaplatz.

==== Major highways ====
Federal Highway 5 passes Kuppenheim on its western city limits. The four-lane Bundesstraße 462 leads from the Rastatt-Nord exit to Kuppenheim.

=== Newspapers ===
Das Kommunal-Echo ("The Local Echo"), appearing every Thursday in Kuppenheim and Bischweier, serves not only local news but also as an information platform.

=== Education ===
- Grundschule Oberndorf (Oberndorf Elementary School)
- Favoriteschule (Primary and Secondary School)
- Werner-von-Siemens-Realschule (Secondary School)

=== Established Businesses ===
- Heinz von Heiden Massivhäuser
- Daimler AG

== Personalities ==
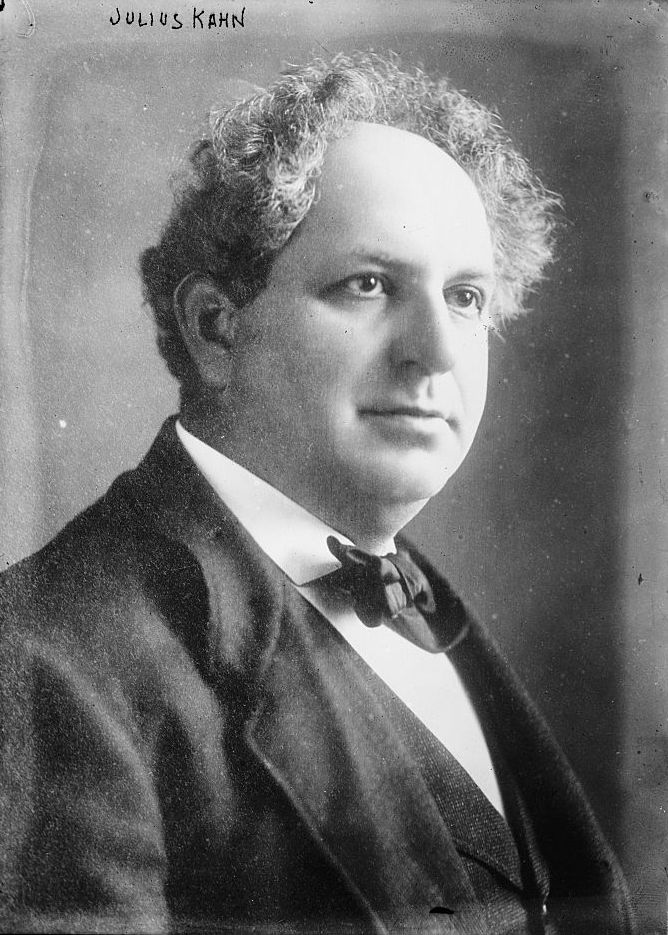
Julius Kahn

=== Hometown Sons and Daughters ===
- Julius Kahn (1861–1924), US Congressman
- Johann Schaeuble (1904–1968), anthropologist, hereditary biologist and university professor
- Warnfried Dettling (-1943), political scientist and publicist
- Wolfgang Raub (1954-), Cook, awarded with a star in the Michelin Guide
- Ulrich Maximilian Schumann (-1964), art and building historian and museologist
- Sebastian Walz, immigrated to the US and became the great grandfather of Governor and Vice-Presidential candidate Tim Walz.

==== Jonas Kuppenheimer ====
In 1862, Kuppenheim native Jonas Kuppenheimer (born March 6, 1837) founded a clothier company in the United States called "Kuppenheimer Men's Clothiers Inc." This company specialized in the production of exclusive men's fashion. At the end of 1857, Kuppenheimer lost his civil rights when he did not comply with the Badenese draft and so emigrated from Kuppenheim to America to settle in Terre Haute, Indiana where he found work as a writer. There he was drafted into a military battalion in Indiana to fight in the American Civil War; he was discharged in 1862 due to injuries. Then he returned to Terre Haute and founded a clothing wholesaler there with his older brother Bernhard, who returned to Kuppenheim in 1873 for a visit. In 1865, Jonas left Bernhard to manage the Terre Haute operations and opened a new site Chicago, Illinois, where he eventually moved the corporate headquarters. Jonas and Bernhard managed the company for the rest of the 19th century and into the 20th. Jonas Kuppenheimer died on July 11, 1902.

==== Erwin and Theresa Roos ====
Erwin Roos was an entrepreneur and painter. In 1923 he took over a paint factory from his mother. In 1934 he designed a war memorial that was built at the Wörtel Stadium. Erwin Roos also painted various views of Kuppenheim. He died on May 21, 1960. A street was named in Kuppenheim after him.

His wife Theresa Roos served as a nurse in various hospitals in both world wars and headed the DRK Sisters in Kuppenheim from 1935 to 1974. For her commitment, she was awarded the DRK medal and the Federal Cross of Merit. At well over 100 years, she became one of the oldest residents of Kuppenheim.

==== Thomas Grochowiak ====
Thomas Grochowiak (1914–2012), was a renowned painter. His studio was on Rheinstrasse

== Literature ==
- Gerhard Friedrich Linder: The Jewish Community in Kuppenheim. Verlag Regionalkultur, 1999, ISBN 3-89735-110-2.
- Gerhard Friedrich Linder: Kuppenheim: Chronicle of a City. Verlag Regionalkultur, 1999, ISBN 3-89735-117-X.
- Gil Hüttenmeister, Gerhard Friedrich Linder. Dedication to the Unforgettable Husband. Epitaphs. Verlag Regionalkultur, 2009, ISBN 978-3-89735-573-6.
- Gerhard F. Linder †, Gernot Jutt, City and Historical Association Kuppenheim (ed.): Local family book Kuppenheim with Oberndorf and Rauental. 2 volumes. Verlag Regionalkultur, 2017 - With 1920 pages Reg. German local clan books OSB / OFB No. 00.959 (= Badische local clan books, Volume 177).
