= Muggensturm =

- Municipality
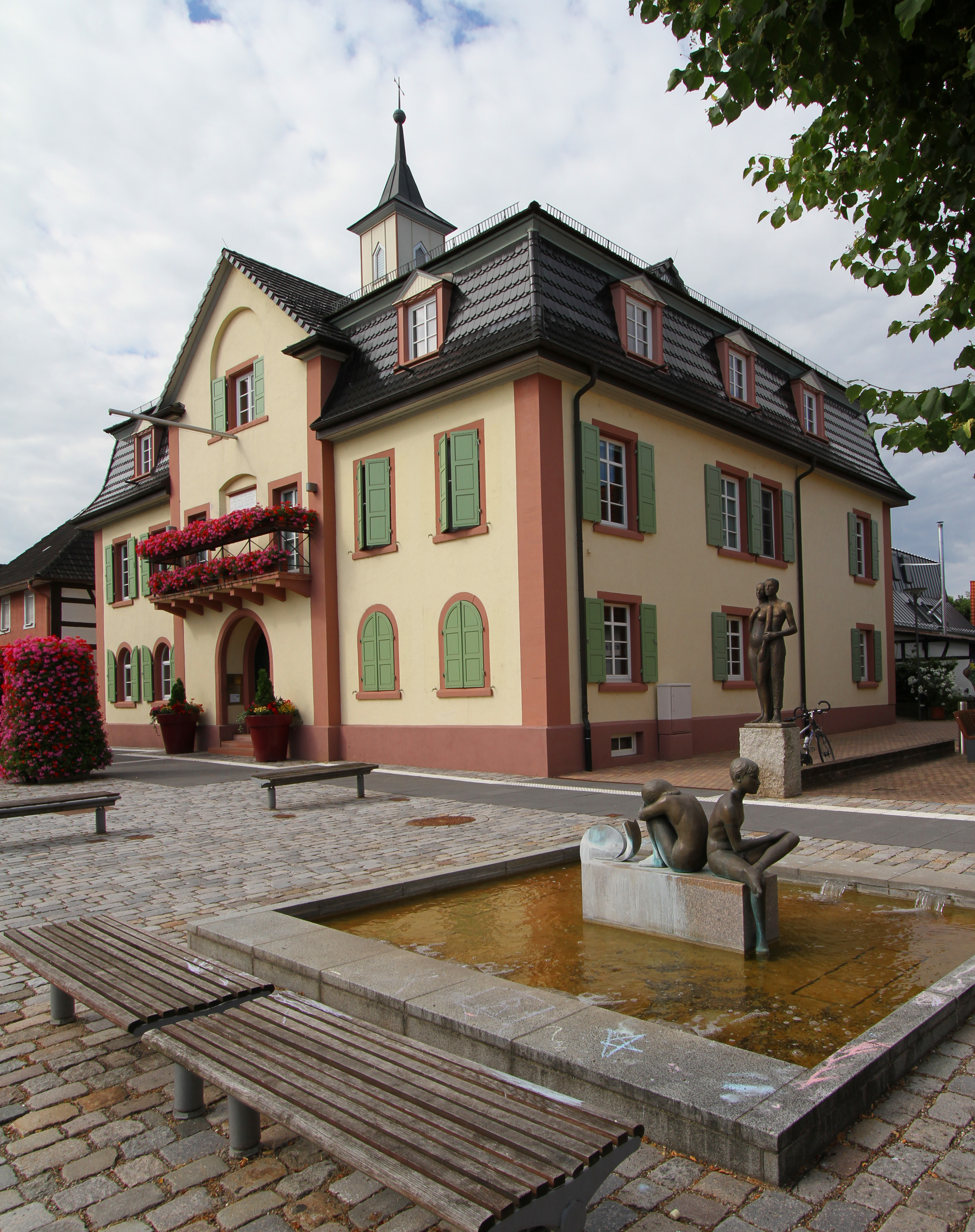
- Town hall

- Coat of arms

- Location of Muggensturm within Rastatt district
- Interactive map of Muggensturm
- Location within Germany Location within Baden-Württemberg
- Coordinates: 48°52′21″N 08°16′46″E
- Country: Germany
- State: Baden-Württemberg
- Admin. region: Karlsruhe
- District: Rastatt

Government
  - Mayor (2022–30): Johannes Kopp (SPD)

Area
  - Total: 11.56 km^{2} (4.46 sq mi)
- Elevation: 122 m (400 ft)

Population (2025-12-31)
  - Total: 6,103
  - Density: 527.9/km^{2} (1,367/sq mi)
- Time zone: UTC+01:00 (CET)
  - Summer (DST): UTC+02:00 (CEST)
- Postal codes: 76461
- Dialling codes: 07222
- Vehicle registration: RA
- Website: www.muggensturm.de

Muggensturm is a municipality in the district of Rastatt in Baden-Württemberg in Germany.

== Geography ==
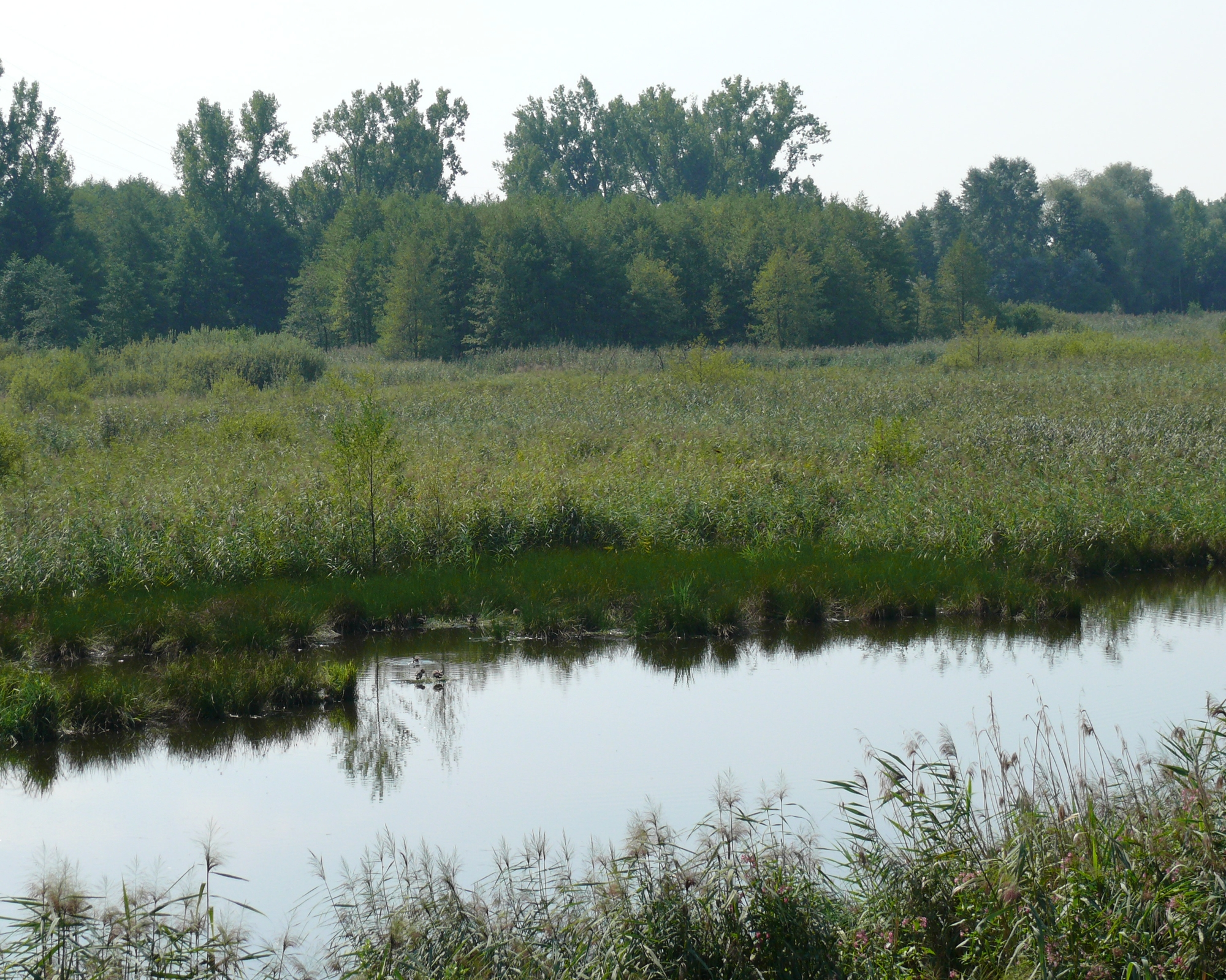
The Federbachbruch nature reserve

Muggensturm is sited in the Upper Rhine Plain at the foot of the Black Forest. The Federbach flows through the town and the neighboring 43 ha nature reserve Federbachbruch.

The municipality borders Bietigheim, Malsch (district of Karlsruhe), Oberweier, Kuppenheim, Waldprechtsweier and Bischweier.

Muggensturm's area contains the municipality as well as the Ziegelhütte house in the Steinhardt and the lost settlements of Eichelbach and Frierlinde.

== History ==
The first mention of Muggensturm can be found in an official document of Pope Celestine III in the year 1193, where it is spelled Mugetstrum.

== Politics ==
=== Municipal council ===
The 2009 local election resulted in the following composition of the municipal council (Gemeinderat):

1. Free Voters (MBV) 38.8% (+11.0), 5 seats (+1)
2. SPD 33.2% (+4.4), 5 seats (+1)
3. CDU 27.9% (-0.9), 4 seats (=)

The voter participation was 54.1% (+0.2). Numbers in braces refer to the results of the previous local election.

=== Mayor ===
Since 1993 Dietmar Späth (born 1963) is the mayor, he was reelected in 2001 and 2009.

=== Town twinning ===
Muggensturm's twin town is Gradara in the Italian province of Pesaro and Urbino. It was established in 2002. In 2011 an additional inner-German town twinning with Schönwalde-Glien (Brandenburg) was founded.

== Culture ==
In 2005, the Bürgerband (citizen belt), a unique community photo album, was installed in the town hall. It shows around 2'500 Muggensturm citizens photographed by journalist Anton Jany.

Every year at the end of July, the Muggensturm Volksfest attracts many visitors. Before 2011, local clubs would decorate waggons with up to 200'000 flowers and participate in a large pageant.

== Demographics ==
Population development:

Year	Inhabitants
2012	6,148
2015	6,179
2019	6,235
2021	6,234

== Awards ==
In 2010, Muggensturm won the gold medal in the Entente Florale competition between municipalities. Entente Florale awards distinguished town development achievements.

== Infrastructure ==
Muggensturm is sited near the Bundesstraße 3 and the Rheintalbahn. It is connected to the Karlsruhe Stadtbahn.
