= Iffezheim =

- Municipality
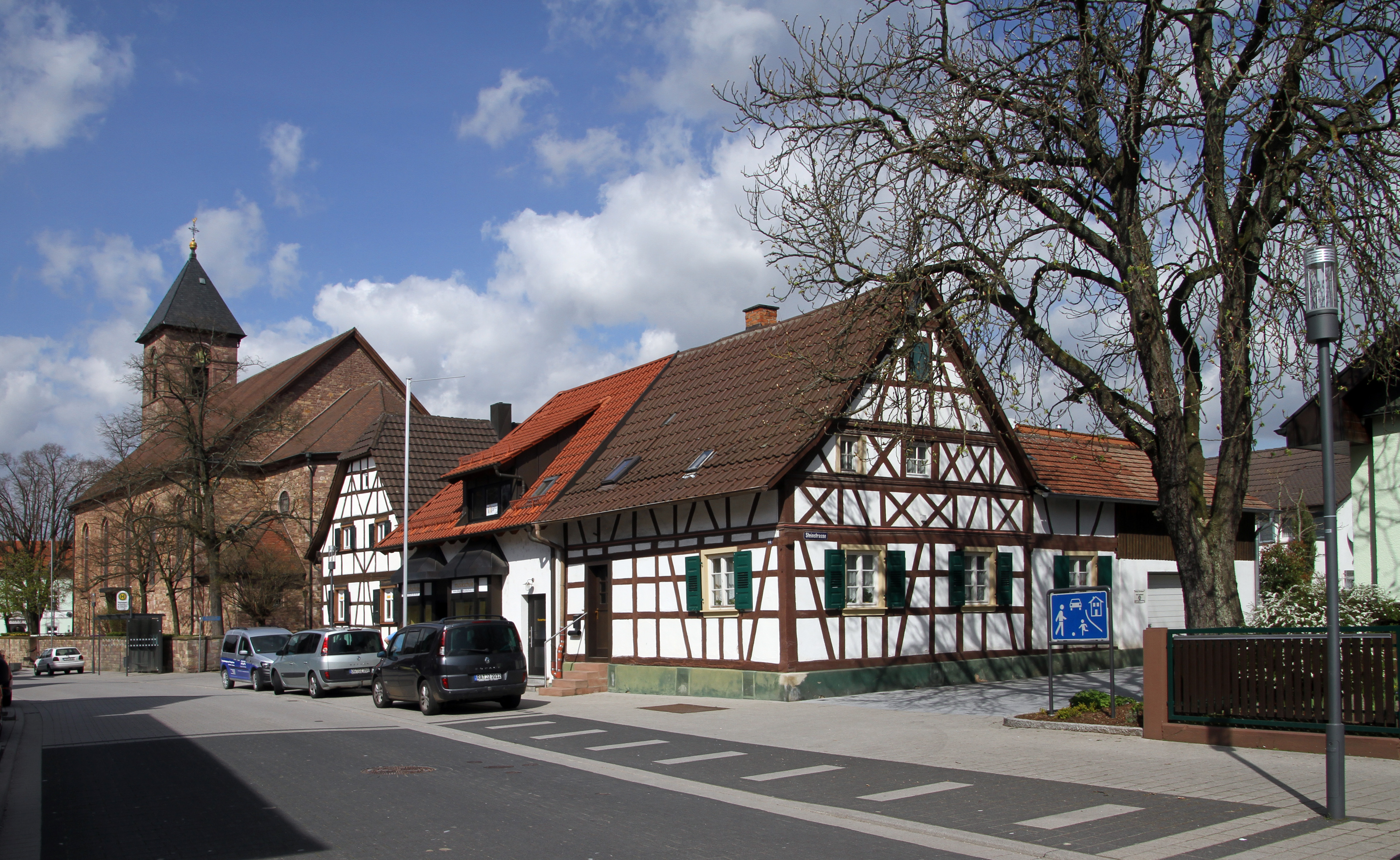
- St. Birgitta and timber framed houses

- Coat of arms

- Location of Iffezheim within Rastatt district
- Interactive map of Iffezheim
- Location within Germany Location within Baden-Württemberg
- Coordinates: 48°49′14″N 08°08′32″E
- Country: Germany
- State: Baden-Württemberg
- Admin. region: Karlsruhe
- District: Rastatt

Government
  - Mayor (2018–26): Christian Schmid

Area
  - Total: 19.95 km^{2} (7.70 sq mi)
- Elevation: 123 m (404 ft)

Population (2025-12-31)
  - Total: 5,186
  - Density: 259.9/km^{2} (673.3/sq mi)
- Time zone: UTC+01:00 (CET)
  - Summer (DST): UTC+02:00 (CEST)
- Postal codes: 76473
- Dialling codes: 07229
- Vehicle registration: RA
- Website: www.iffezheim.de

Iffezheim is a town in the district of Rastatt in Baden-Württemberg in Germany. It lies close to the Rhine river, where the Lock Iffezheim is also situated. Iffezheim is also known for the horse races, which takes place three times a year.

== Politics ==
=== Mayors ===
- Jakob Huber (1891–1893)
- Konrad Mußler (1893–1911)
- Johannes N. Huber (1911–1919)
- Anton Oesterle (1920–1932)
- Friedrich König (1932–1939)
- Heinrich Hertweck (1939–1945)
- Franz Xaver Huber (1945–1961)
- Albin König (1961–1978)
- Otto Himpel (1978–2002)
- Peter Werler (2002-2018)
- Christian Schmid (since 2018)

=== Civil parish ===
Results of the Kommunalwahl from 13 June 2004:

1. CDU: 44.8% (6 seats)
2. FWG: 33.0% (5 seats)
3. SPD: 22.2% (3 seats)

=== Twin cities ===
Iffezheim is twinned with:

- Dahlwitz-Hoppegarten, Germany
- Mondolfo, Italy

=== Coat of arms ===
The current coat of arms, which was already used in the 16th century, shows an inverted black anchor with a red rudder on a white ground. It's the official seal of Iffezheim since the 19th century. In the meantime a so-called Wolfsangel was in use.
