= Rastatt (district) =

- District
- Flag Coat of arms
- Coordinates: 48.8°N 8.27°E
- Country: Germany
- State: Baden-Württemberg
- Adm. region: Karlsruhe
- Capital: Rastatt

Government
  - District admin.: Christian Dusch (CDU)

Area
  - Total: 738.77 km^{2} (285.24 sq mi)

Population (31 December 2023)
  - Total: 231,356
  - Density: 313.16/km^{2} (811.09/sq mi)
- Time zone: UTC+01:00 (CET)
  - Summer (DST): UTC+02:00 (CEST)
- Vehicle registration: RA
- Website: www.landkreis-rastatt.de

Rastatt is a Landkreis (district) in the west of Baden-Württemberg, Germany. Neighbouring districts are (from north clockwise) Karlsruhe, Calw, Freudenstadt and the Ortenaukreis. To the west it borders the French département Bas-Rhin. Rastatt completely surrounds the district-free city Baden-Baden.

== History ==
The district was created in 1939 as the successor of the Oberamt Rastatt and later the Großkreis Baden. In 1973 it was merged with the majority of the neighboring district Bühl, and some small parts of the district Kehl.

== Geography ==
The district is located in the Rhine valley. The south-east part, however, is part of the Northern Black Forest. The highest elevation is the Hoher Ochsenkopf.

The county has three small exclaves within the borough of Baden-Baden. The largest of these is home to the Waldenecksee and the smallest is the old Fremersberg Abbey.

== Partnerships ==
Since 1968 the district has partnership with the Finnish city Vantaa. The partnership with the Italian Provincia di Pesaro e Urbino was started in 1996. It is twinned with Fano in Italy, New Britain, Connecticut in the USA and also twinned with Woking, England in 2000. It is also twinned with the Czech town from which its Princess came from during the Baroque period and for whom the summer palace was built.

== Coat of arms ==
The top-left corner of the coat of arms show a wine ladder, the symbol of the city Rastatt. The grapes in the top-right symbolize the viticulture in the area around Bühl. The red bar on yellow ground in the bottom-right is the symbol of Baden, and the rose in bottom-left is the symbol of the counts of Eberstein.

== Cities and towns ==
Clickable map of towns and municipalities in the district

Cities	Towns
1. Bühl; 2. Gaggenau; 3. Gernsbach; 4. Kuppenheim; 5. Lichtenau; 6. Rastatt	1. Au am Rhein; 2. Bietigheim (Baden); 3. Bischweier; 4. Bühlertal; 5. Durmersheim; 6. Elchesheim-Illingen; 7. Forbach; 8. Hügelsheim; 9. Iffezheim; 10. Loffenau; 11. Muggensturm; 12. Ötigheim; 13. Ottersweier; 14. Rheinmünster; 15. Sinzheim; 16. Steinmauern; 17. Weisenbach
Administrative districts	1. Au am Rhein; 2. Bietigheim (Baden); 3. Bischweier; 4. Bühlertal; 5. Durmersheim; 6. Elchesheim-Illingen; 7. Forbach; 8. Hügelsheim; 9. Iffezheim; 10. Loffenau; 11. Muggensturm; 12. Ötigheim; 13. Ottersweier; 14. Rheinmünster; 15. Sinzheim; 16. Steinmauern; 17. Weisenbach
1. Bischweier-Kuppenheim; 2. Bühl; 3. Durmersheim; 4. Gernsbach; 5. Rastatt; 6. Rheinmünster-Lichtenau; 7. Sinzheim	1. Au am Rhein; 2. Bietigheim (Baden); 3. Bischweier; 4. Bühlertal; 5. Durmersheim; 6. Elchesheim-Illingen; 7. Forbach; 8. Hügelsheim; 9. Iffezheim; 10. Loffenau; 11. Muggensturm; 12. Ötigheim; 13. Ottersweier; 14. Rheinmünster; 15. Sinzheim; 16. Steinmauern; 17. Weisenbach
