= Au am Rhein =

- Municipality
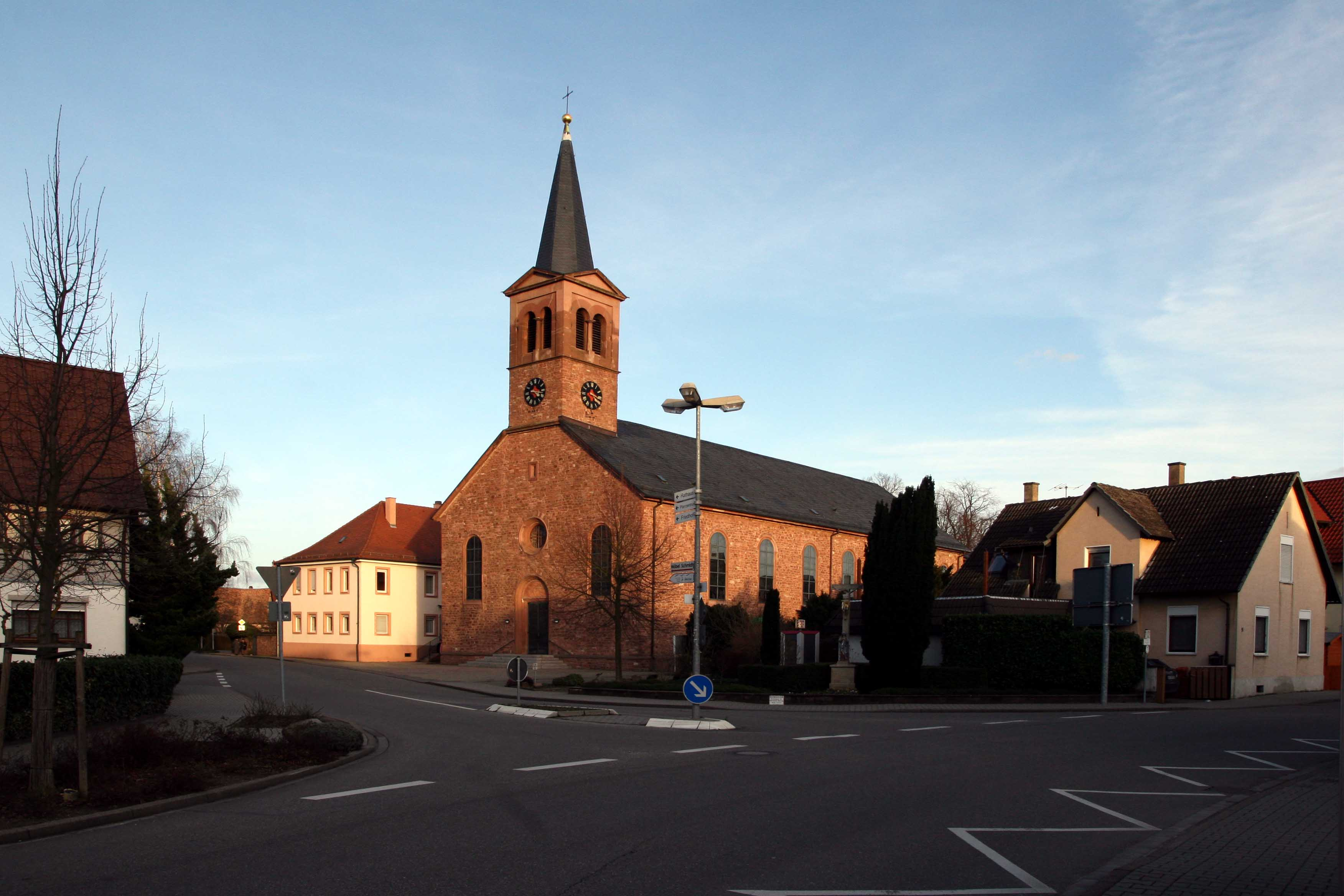
- Church of Saint Andrew

- Coat of arms

- Location of Au am Rhein within Rastatt district
- Interactive map of Au am Rhein
- Location within Germany Location within Baden-Württemberg
- Coordinates: 48°57′05″N 08°14′11″E
- Country: Germany
- State: Baden-Württemberg
- Admin. region: Karlsruhe
- District: Rastatt

Government
  - Mayor (2017–25): Veronika Laukart

Area
  - Total: 13.29 km^{2} (5.13 sq mi)
- Elevation: 111 m (364 ft)

Population (2025-12-31)
  - Total: 3,389
  - Density: 255.0/km^{2} (660.5/sq mi)
- Time zone: UTC+01:00 (CET)
  - Summer (DST): UTC+02:00 (CEST)
- Postal codes: 76474
- Dialling codes: 07245
- Vehicle registration: RA
- Website: www.auamrhein.de

Au am Rhein (German pronunciation: [ˈaʊ ʔam ˈʁaɪn], lit. 'Au on the Rhine') is a municipality in the district of Rastatt in Baden-Württemberg in Germany.

== Mayor ==
- Since 2017: Veronika Laukart
- From 1985 to 2017: Hartwig Rihm (born 1949) (CDU). He was reelected in 1993, 2001 and 2009.
