= Bischweier =

- Municipality
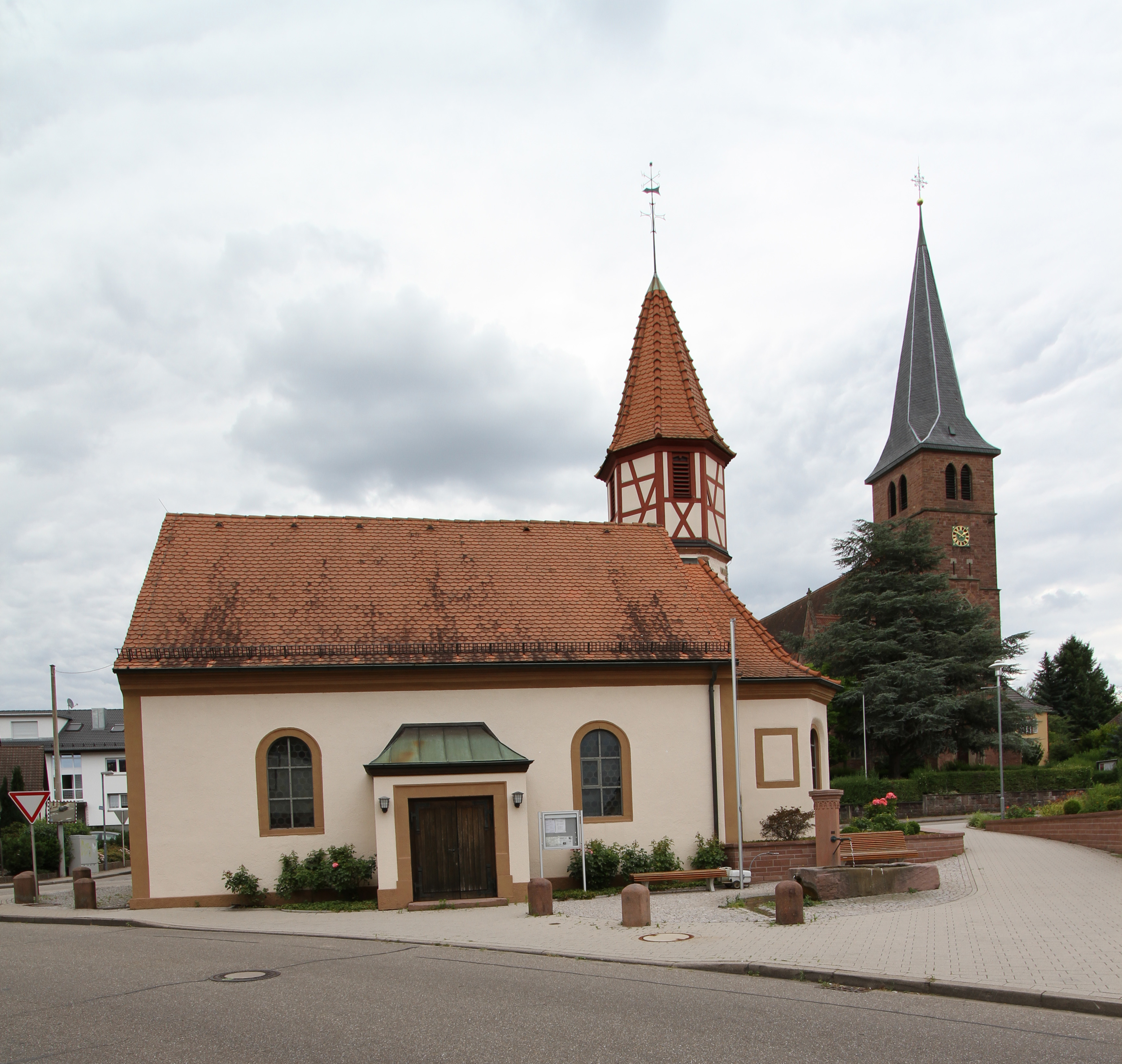
- Chapel and Church of Saint Anne

- Coat of arms

- Location of Bischweier within Rastatt district
- Interactive map of Bischweier
- Location within Germany Location within Baden-Württemberg
- Coordinates: 48°50′16″N 08°17′03″E
- Country: Germany
- State: Baden-Württemberg
- Admin. region: Karlsruhe
- District: Rastatt

Government
  - Mayor (2020–28): Robert Wein

Area
  - Total: 4.59 km^{2} (1.77 sq mi)
- Elevation: 133 m (436 ft)

Population (2025-12-31)
  - Total: 3,046
  - Density: 664/km^{2} (1,720/sq mi)
- Time zone: UTC+01:00 (CET)
  - Summer (DST): UTC+02:00 (CEST)
- Postal codes: 76476
- Dialling codes: 07222
- Vehicle registration: RA
- Website: www.bischweier.de

Bischweier is a municipality in the district of Rastatt in Baden-Württemberg in Germany.

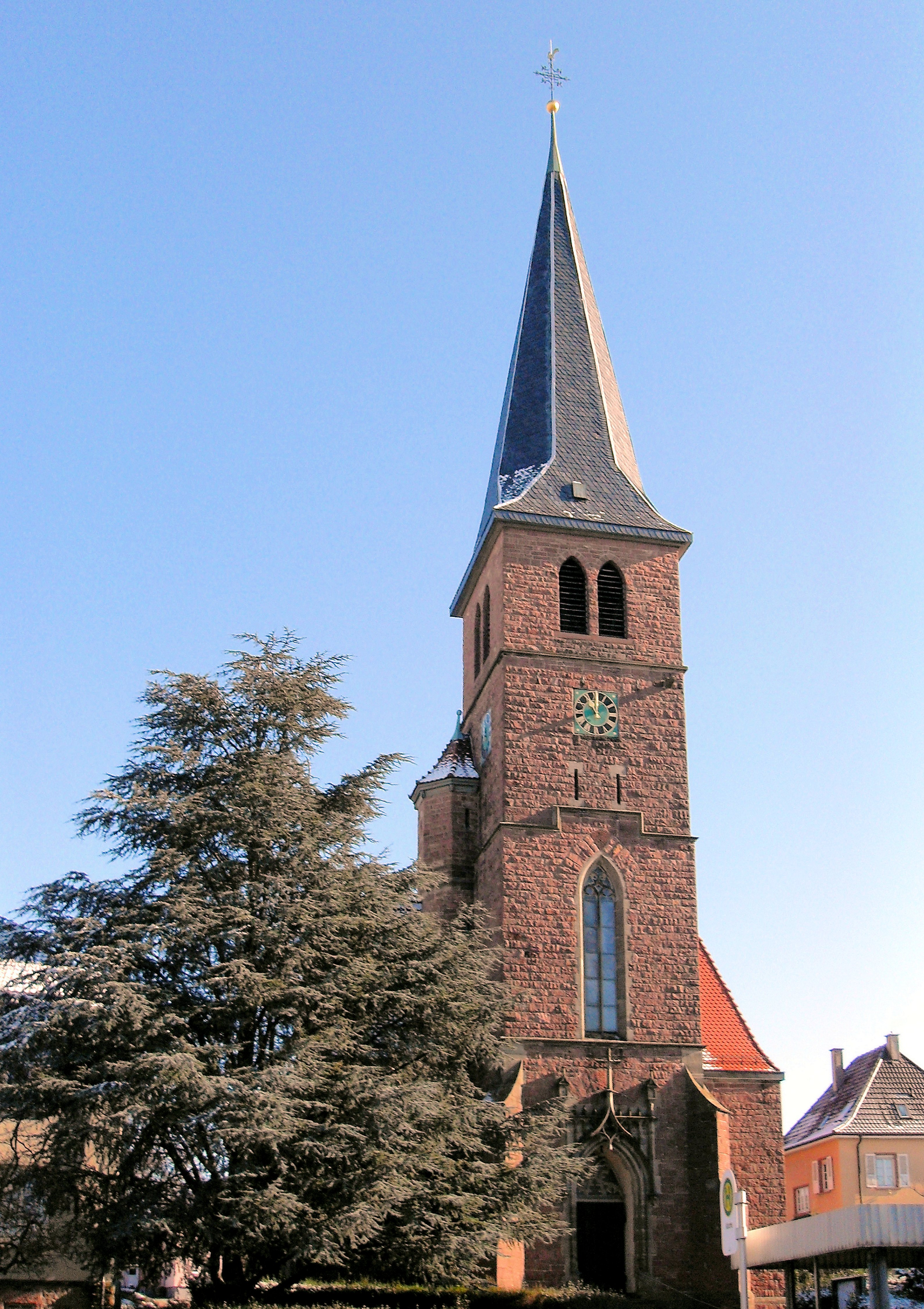
Church of Saint Anne
