= Steinmauern =

- Municipality
- Coat of arms

- Location of Steinmauern within Rastatt district
- Interactive map of Steinmauern
- Location within Germany Location within Baden-Württemberg
- Coordinates: 48°54′01″N 08°11′55″E
- Country: Germany
- State: Baden-Württemberg
- Admin. region: Karlsruhe
- District: Rastatt

Government
  - Mayor (2020–28): Toni Hoffarth

Area
  - Total: 12.40 km^{2} (4.79 sq mi)
- Elevation: 110 m (360 ft)

Population (2025-12-31)
  - Total: 3,198
  - Density: 257.9/km^{2} (668.0/sq mi)
- Time zone: UTC+01:00 (CET)
  - Summer (DST): UTC+02:00 (CEST)
- Postal codes: 76479
- Dialling codes: 07222
- Vehicle registration: RA
- Website: www.steinmauern.de

Steinmauern is a town in the district of Rastatt in Baden-Württemberg in Germany. It falls under the administrative jurisdiction of Karlsruhe.

== Mayor ==
Siegfried Schaaf was the mayor from 1992 until 2020, he was re-elected in 2000, 2008 and 2016. Toni Hoffarth was elected mayor in 2020.

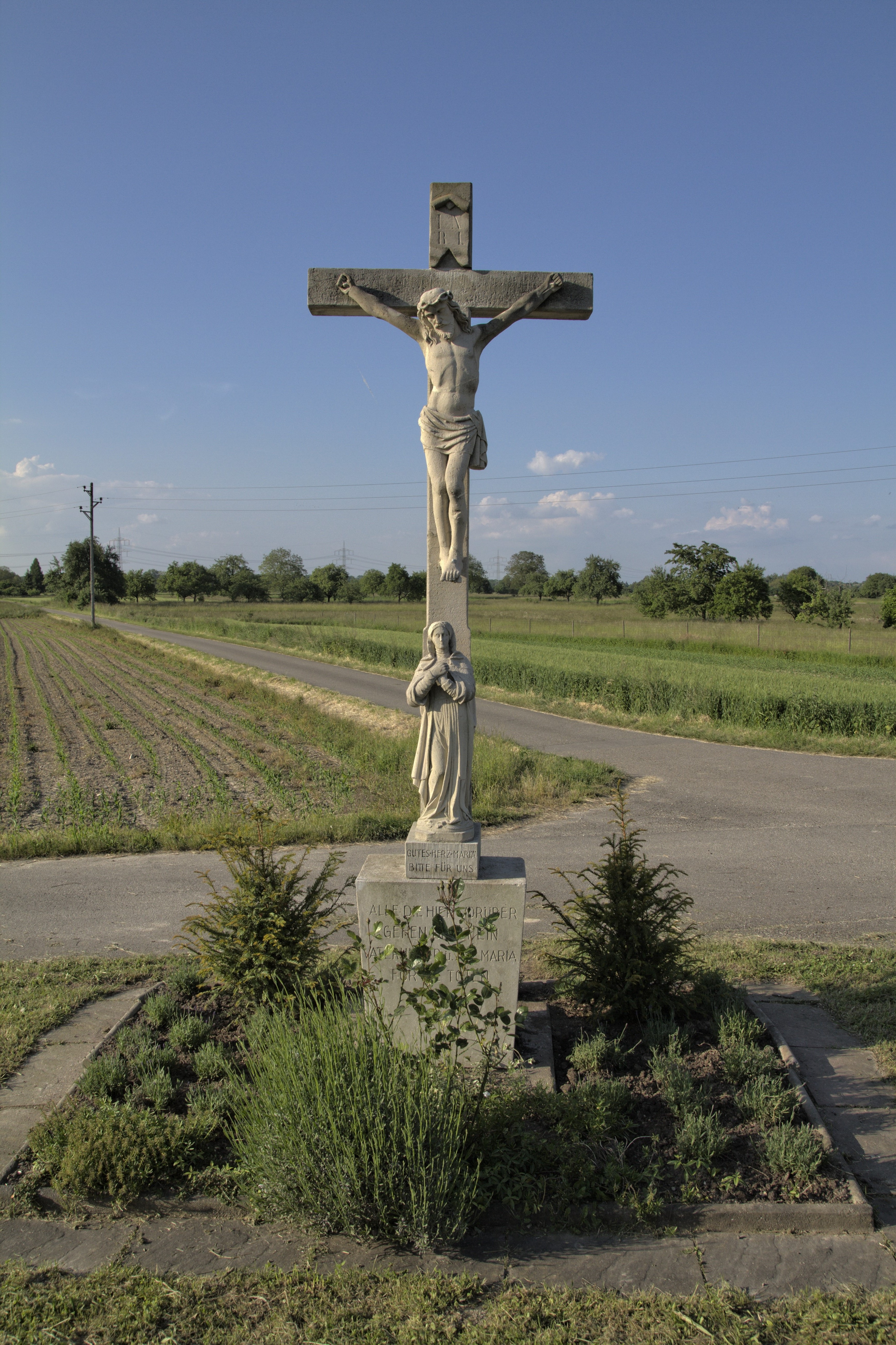
Wayside cross in Steinmauern
