= Bundesstraße 462 =

Federal highway in Germany

B 462
- Bundesstraße 462
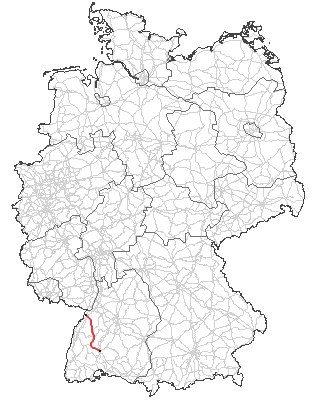

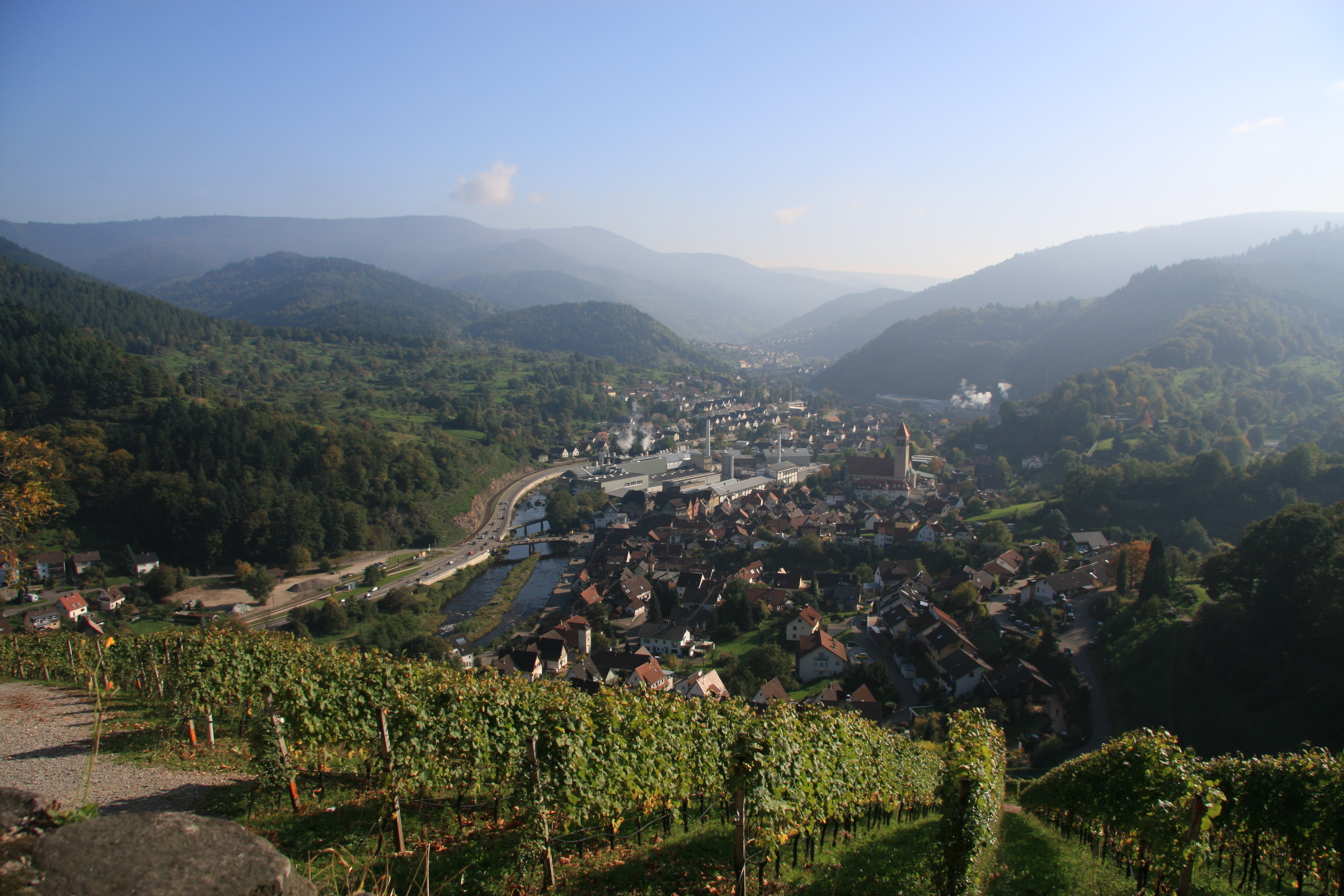
- The B 462 in the Murg valley near Gernsbach-Obertsrot

Route information
- Length: 114 km (71 mi)

Location
- Country: Germany
- States: Baden-Württemberg

Highway system
- Roads in Germany; Autobahns; List; Federal; List; State; E-roads

The Bundesstraße 462 (B 462) is a German Bundesstraße or federal road. It runs from the Upper Rhine Plain near Rastatt for about 114 kilometres (71 mi) through the northern Black Forest to Rottweil. The section from Rastatt to Freudenstadt, which runs through the Murg valley to Baiersbronn, has been known since the 1960s as the Black Forest Valleys Road (Schwarzwald-Tälerstraße) and, along with the B 500 (Black Forest High Road), is one of the tourist routes in the Black Forest. Both roads meet in Freudenstadt. In 2001 the section from Rastatt to Gaggenau was widened into a dual carriageway as far as Schloss Bad Rotenfels (Landesakademie) and a further widening to the centre of Gaggenau is planned. In 1997, the road through Gernsbach was relieved by the building of the 1,527-metre-long Gernsbach Tunnel.

== Route ==
The B 462 runs through the following larger settlements: Rastatt, Kuppenheim, Gaggenau, Gernsbach, Weisenbach, Forbach, Baiersbronn, Freudenstadt, Alpirsbach, Schenkenzell, Schiltach, Schramberg, Rottweil. From there the B 14 continues to Tuttlingen.

== Electrification ==
In the "eWayBW" pilot project, the route 462 between Kuppenheim and Gernsbach-Obertsrot is to serve as a test route for trolleybus lorries. Three six-kilometer sections in this area will be electrified for this purpose. As of 2018, commissioning in 2020 and dismantling of the facilities is scheduled after three years of testing. After two "E-Highway" pilot projects on motorways is in Germany the first test on a public road.

== See also ==
- List of Bundesstraßen in Germany
