= Herrenwieser Schwallung =

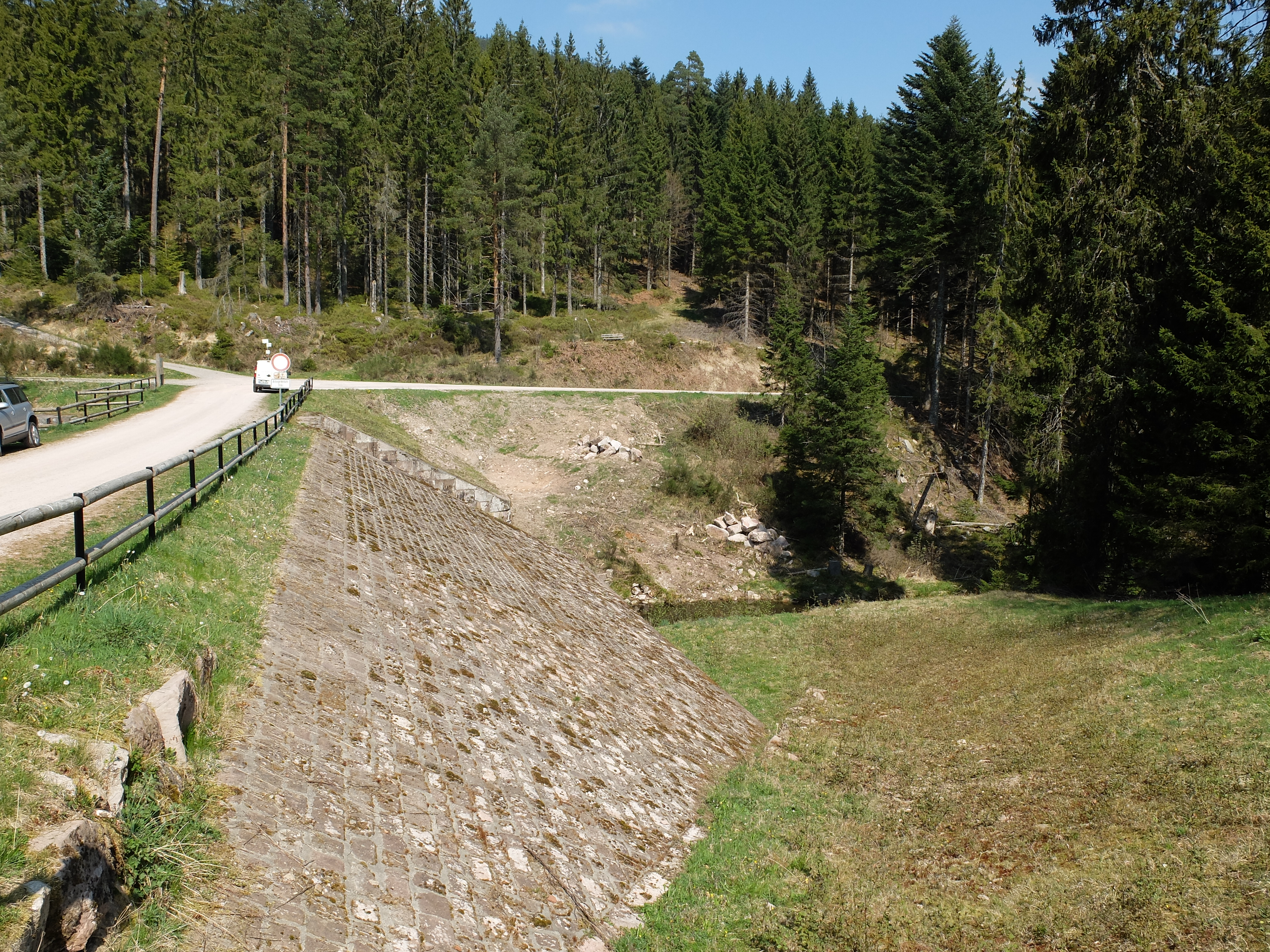
- Downstream side
- Interactive map of Herrenwieser Schwallung
- Location: Forbach, county of Rastatt, Baden-Württemberg, Germany; Northern Black Forest
- Coordinates: 48°39′20″N 8°17′25″E
- Construction began: 1844

Dam and spillways
- Impounds: Schwarzenbach

Reservoir
- Total capacity: 25,000 m^{3}
- Catchment area: 9.6 km^{2}

The Herrenwieser Schwallung is a splash dam, built in 1844–47 of bunter sandstone, near Herrenwies in the Black Forest, which impounds the waters of the Schwarzenbach stream into a pond. In the days of timber rafting it was periodically opened and washed the fallen logs or timber rafts downstream into the valley. Today the dam acts as a bridge over the Schwarzenbach.

== Technology ==
Until 1844 a wooden splash dam (Schwallung) stood on the same spot. Because it took a great deal of maintenance, however, it was replaced under the direction of Weisenbach master stonemason, Belzer, with a dam made of bunter sandstone that is still there today. The individual stones were very precisely carved and laid without any mortar and the structure was finished with perfectly fitting, wedged keystones.

The dam stands at a valley floor height of roughly 708 m above NHN, is about 20.5 metres wide at the foot, 67 metres long and can store 20,000 to 25,000 cubic metres of water.

== Timber transportation ==
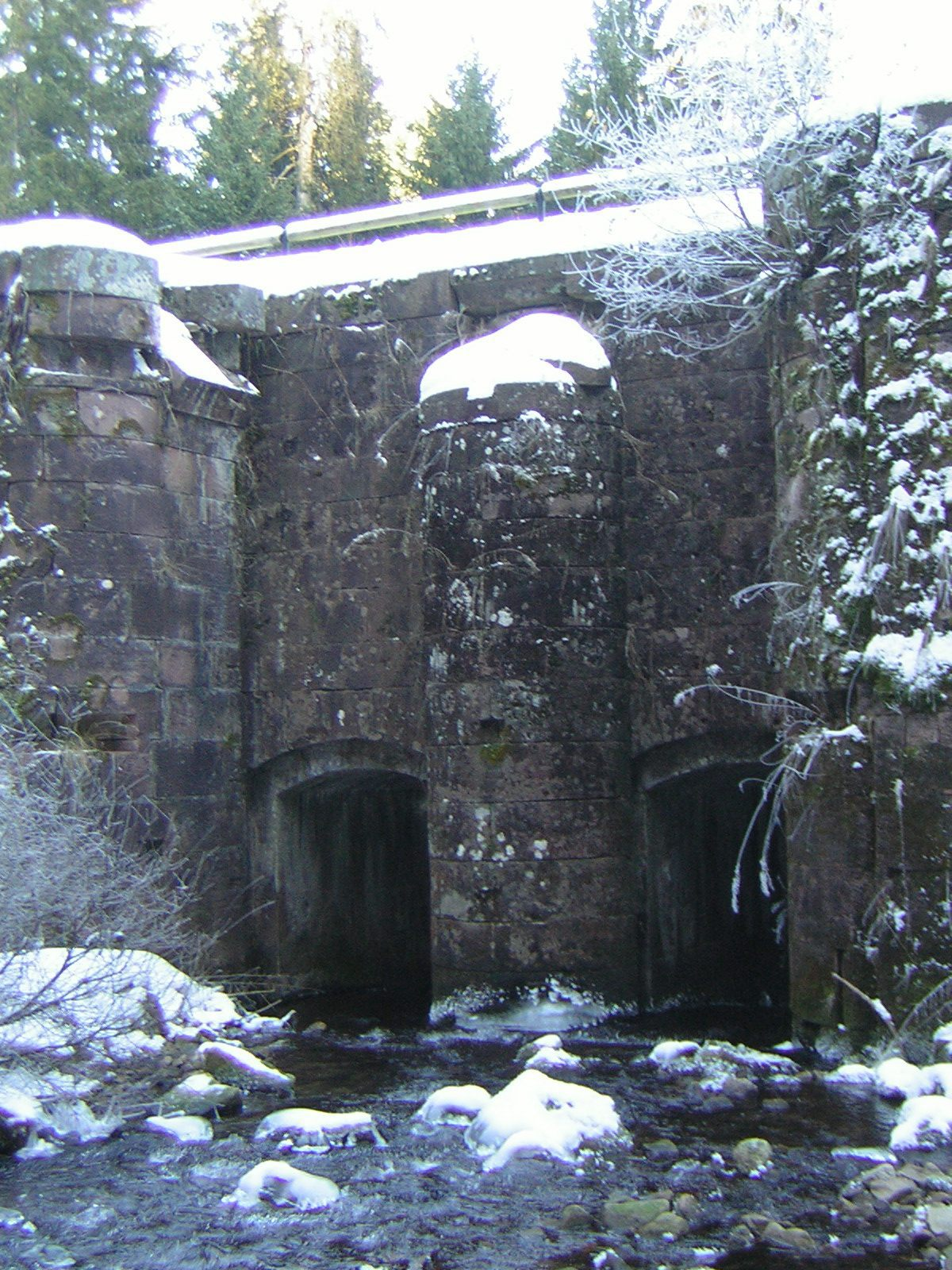
Upstream view of the gates

The logs for timber rafting were hauled down tracks (Lotwegen) from the mountains to the rafting pond (Floßstube) on the valley side of the splash dam by horses and stored there. By suddenly opening the two lock gates, the logs floated into the Murg valley. Rafters (Floßknechte) freed any jammed logs using raft poles (Floßstangen). This work on the raft was dangerous and drew onlookers from the surrounding area, for example from the nearby town of Baden-Baden.

Further downstream on the Murg in Gernsbach and Hörden the logs were roped together into timber rafts and floated down to the River Rhine, where they were combined into larger rafts that were hauled to Holland for sale.

== Literature ==
- Karl Friedrich Viktor Jägerschmid: Das Murgthal: besonders in Hinsicht auf Naturgeschichte und Statistik, 1800, pp. 93–98 (description of its wooden predecessor; digitalised).
