= Staufenberg (Gernsbach) =

- Stadtteil of Gernsbach
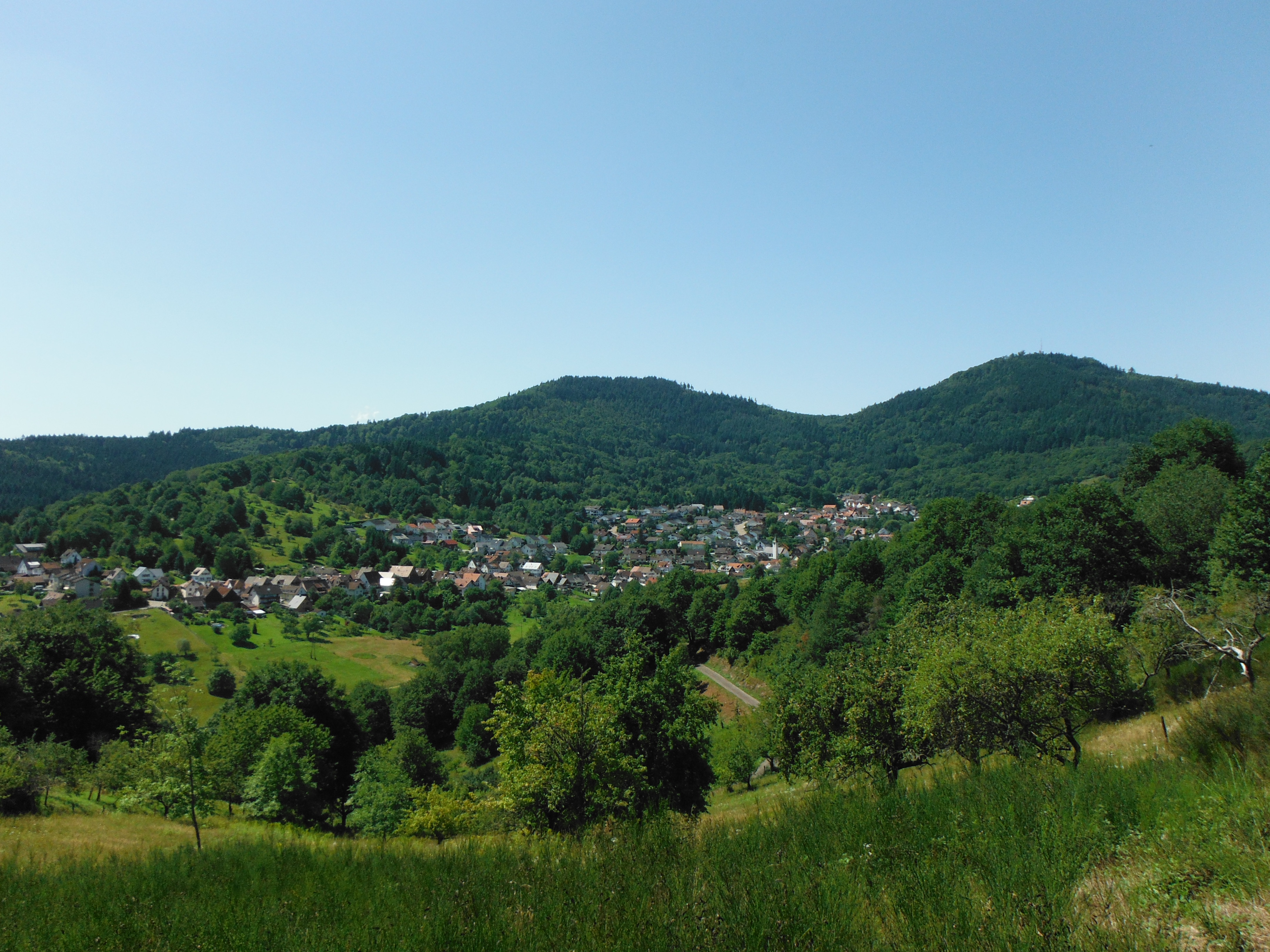
- View over Staufenberg

- Coat of arms
- Interactive map of Staufenberg
- Location within Germany Location within Baden-Württemberg
- Coordinates: 48°45′58″N 8°18′28″E
- Country: Germany
- State: Baden-Württemberg
- Admin. region: Karlsruhe
- District: Rastatt
- Town: Gernsbach

Area
  - Total: 4.0104 km^{2} (1.5484 sq mi)
- Elevation: 226 m (741 ft)

Population
  - Total: 1,600
  - Density: 400/km^{2} (1,000/sq mi)
- Time zone: UTC+01:00 (CET)
  - Summer (DST): UTC+02:00 (CEST)
- Postal codes: 76593
- Dialling codes: 07224

Staufenberg (German pronunciation: [ˈʃtaʊfn̩ˌbɛʁk]) is a village in Baden-Württemberg, Germany. It is administratively part of the town of Gernsbach in the Rastatt district.

== Geography ==
The village is located directly west of Gernsbach on a small tributary of the Murg River.

== History ==
The first documented mention of Staufenberg is as 'vinea Stoufenberg' in the year 1274. On January 1, 1971, Staufenberg was incorporated into the town of Gernsbach.
