= Herrenwieser =

Herrenwieser may refer to the following places in Germany:

- Herrenwieser Schwallung, a sandstone dam, built in 1844, near Herrenwies, Forbach, in the Northern Black Forest
- Herrenwieser See, a tarn in the parish of Forbach in the Northern Black Forest
- Herrenwieser Weiher, a bathing lake in Kempten in the Allgäu

See also

- Herrenwies
- Herrnwies
