= Lautenbach (Gernsbach) =

- Stadtteil of Gernsbach
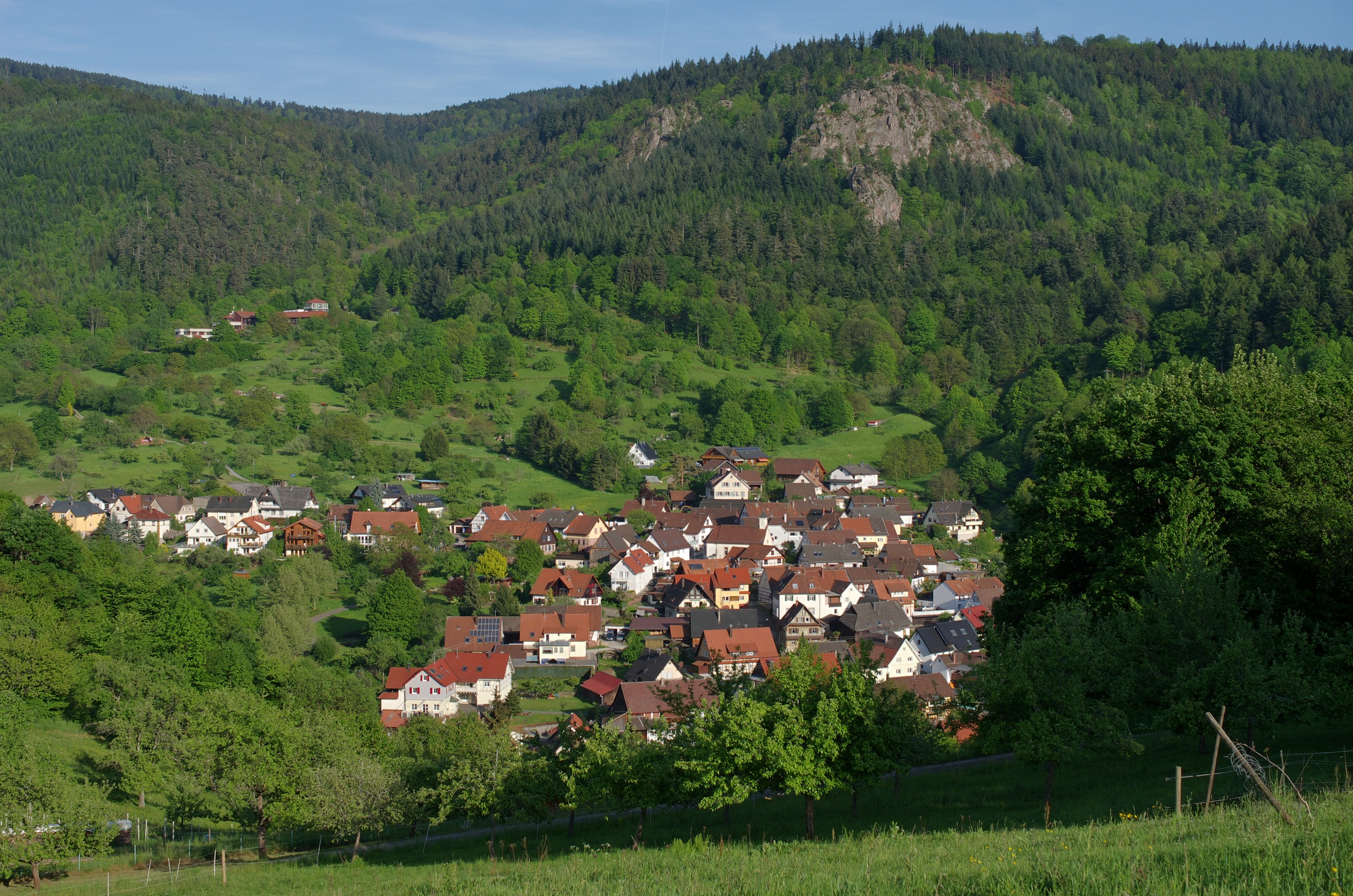
- View over Lautenbach

- Coat of arms
- Interactive map of Lautenbach
- Location within Germany Location within Baden-Württemberg
- Coordinates: 48°45′22″N 8°22′12″E
- Country: Germany
- State: Baden-Württemberg
- Admin. region: Karlsruhe
- District: Rastatt
- Town: Gernsbach

Area
  - Total: 5.7941 km^{2} (2.2371 sq mi)
- Elevation: 314 m (1,030 ft)

Population
  - Total: 600
  - Density: 100/km^{2} (270/sq mi)
- Time zone: UTC+01:00 (CET)
  - Summer (DST): UTC+02:00 (CEST)
- Postal codes: 76593
- Dialling codes: 07224

Lautenbach (German pronunciation: [ˈlaʊtn̩bax]) is a village in Baden-Württemberg, Germany. It is administratively part of the town of Gernsbach in the Rastatt district.

== Geography ==
The village is located south-east of Gernsbach on the Lautenbach stream, a tributary of the Murg River.

== History ==
The first documented mention of Lautenbach is as 'Lutembach' in the year 1339–1340. On January 1, 1975, Reichental was incorporated into the town of Gernsbach.
