= Schurmsee =

Lake in Germany

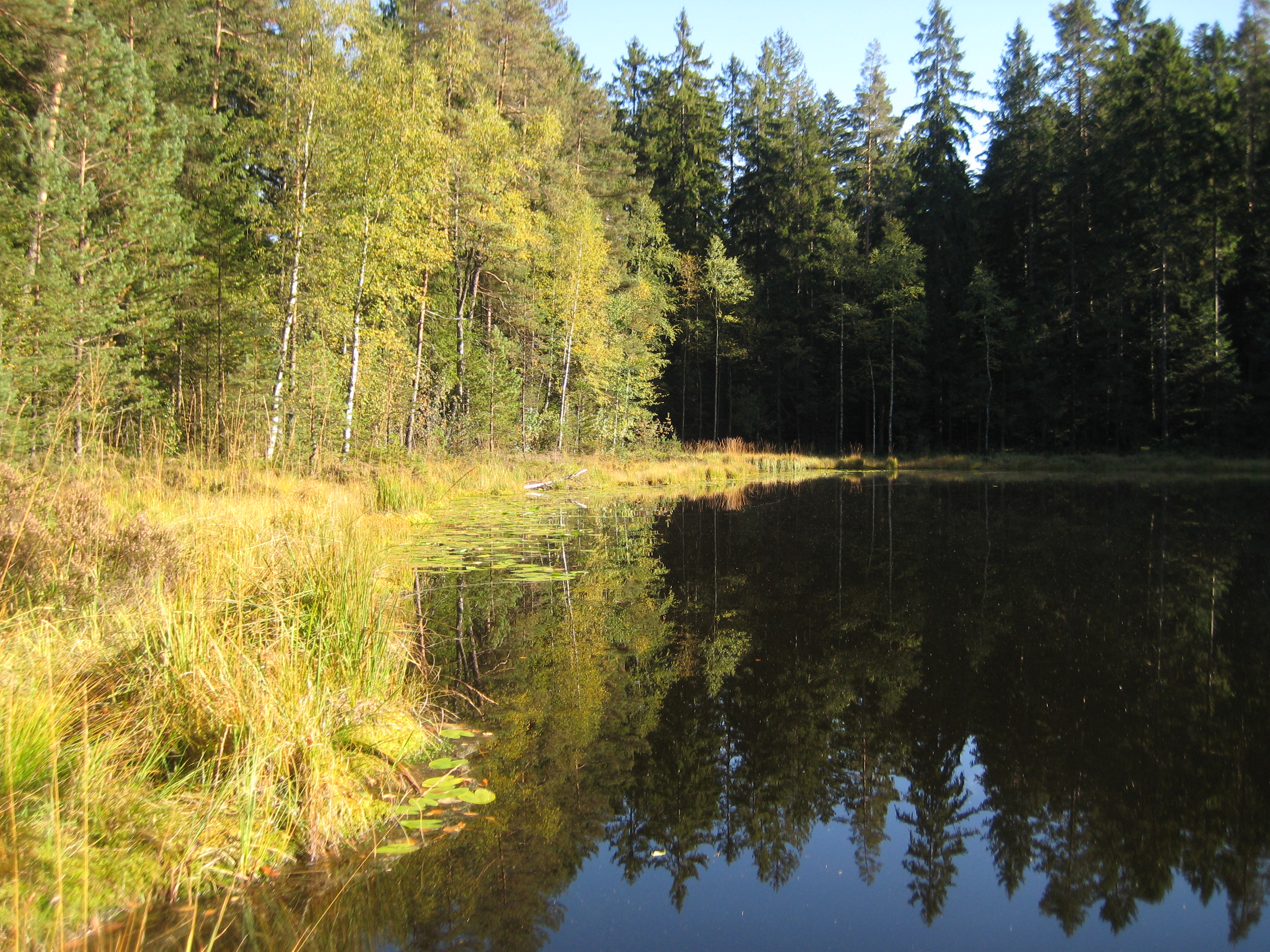

- Location within Baden-Württemberg
- Location: Baden-Württemberg
- Coordinates: 48.613267°N 8.318756°E
- Primary inflows: Vorderer Seebach
- Primary outflows: Vorderer Seebach → Schönmünz → Murg
- Surface area: 1.6 ha (4.0 acres)
- Max. depth: 13 m (43 ft)
- Water volume: 180,000 m^{3} (6,400,000 cu ft)
- Surface elevation: 794 m (2,605 ft)

The Schurmsee is a tarn that lies at a height of 794 metres in the municipality of Forbach in the Northern Black Forest in Germany. It is located on a line between Hundsbach and Schönmünzach. The lake covers an area of 1.6 hectares and is up to 13 metres deep. Its volume is about 180,000 cubic metres. An area of 7.8 hectares, including the tarn and its shore areas, was established as a nature reserve in 1985. Around this reserve, a protected landscape has been declared. The woods on the mountainsides around the lake have also been designated as a Schonwald (protected forest). The lake and its surrounds are a geotope. In addition, the tarn and its environs are a Habitats Directive protected and a bird reserve conforming to the European nature conservation act, Natura 2000.

From the 960-metre-high mountain of Schurmseehöhe there is a good view over the whole lake. There is a circular walk around the tarn. The normal route to the Schurmsee runs on a wide forest track from Schönmünzach for a distance of about 4 kilometres and climbing through around 300 metres.
