= Ilgenbach =

River in Germany

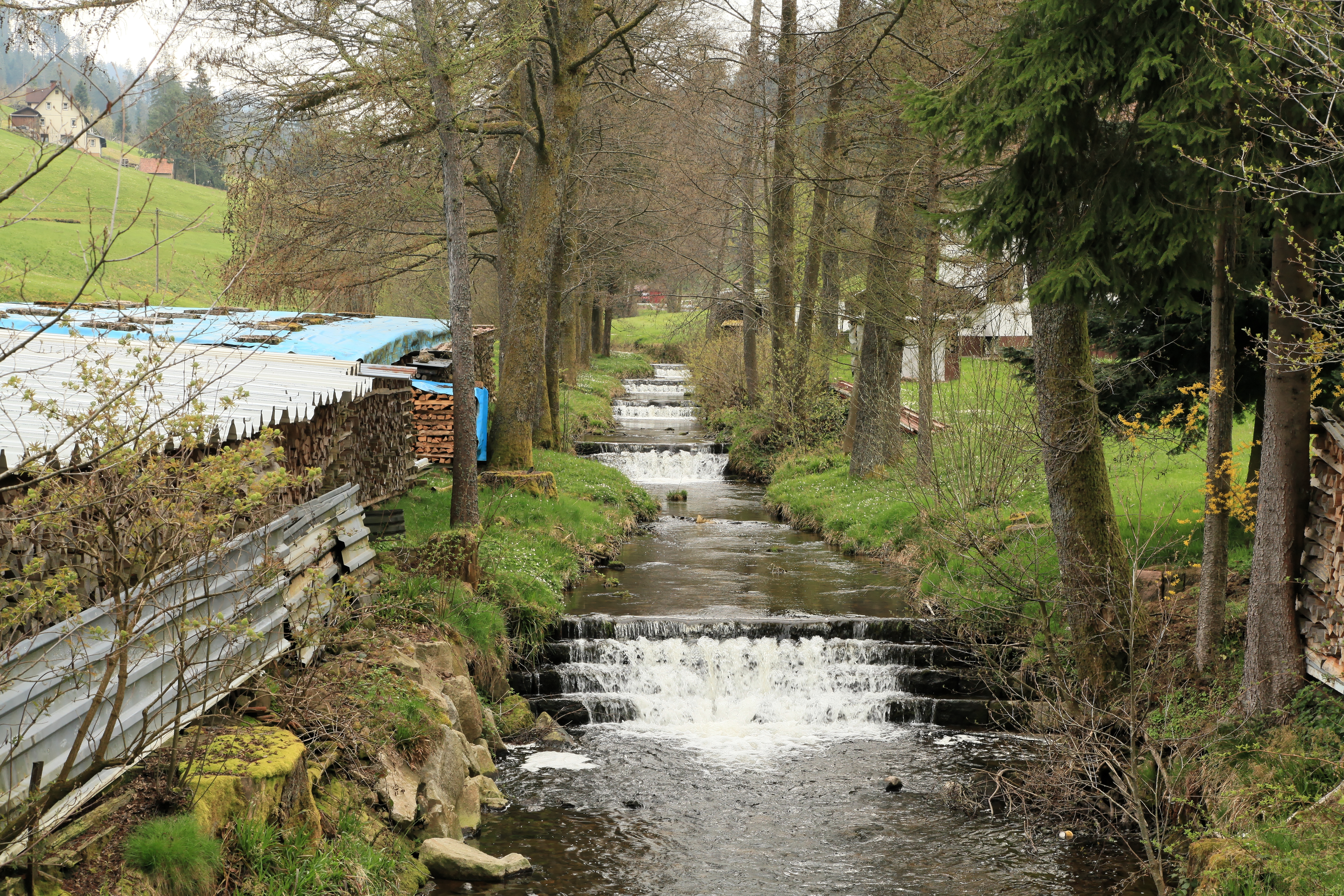

Location
- Country: Germany
- States: Baden-Württemberg

Physical characteristics
- Mouth
  - location: Murg
  - coordinates: 48°31′31″N 08°18′22″E

Basin features
- Progression: Murg→ Rhine→ North Sea

Ilgenbach is a river of Baden-Württemberg, Germany. It flows into the Murg near Baiersbronn-Mitteltal.

== See also ==
- List of rivers of Baden-Württemberg
