= Hilpertsau =

- Stadtteil of Gernsbach
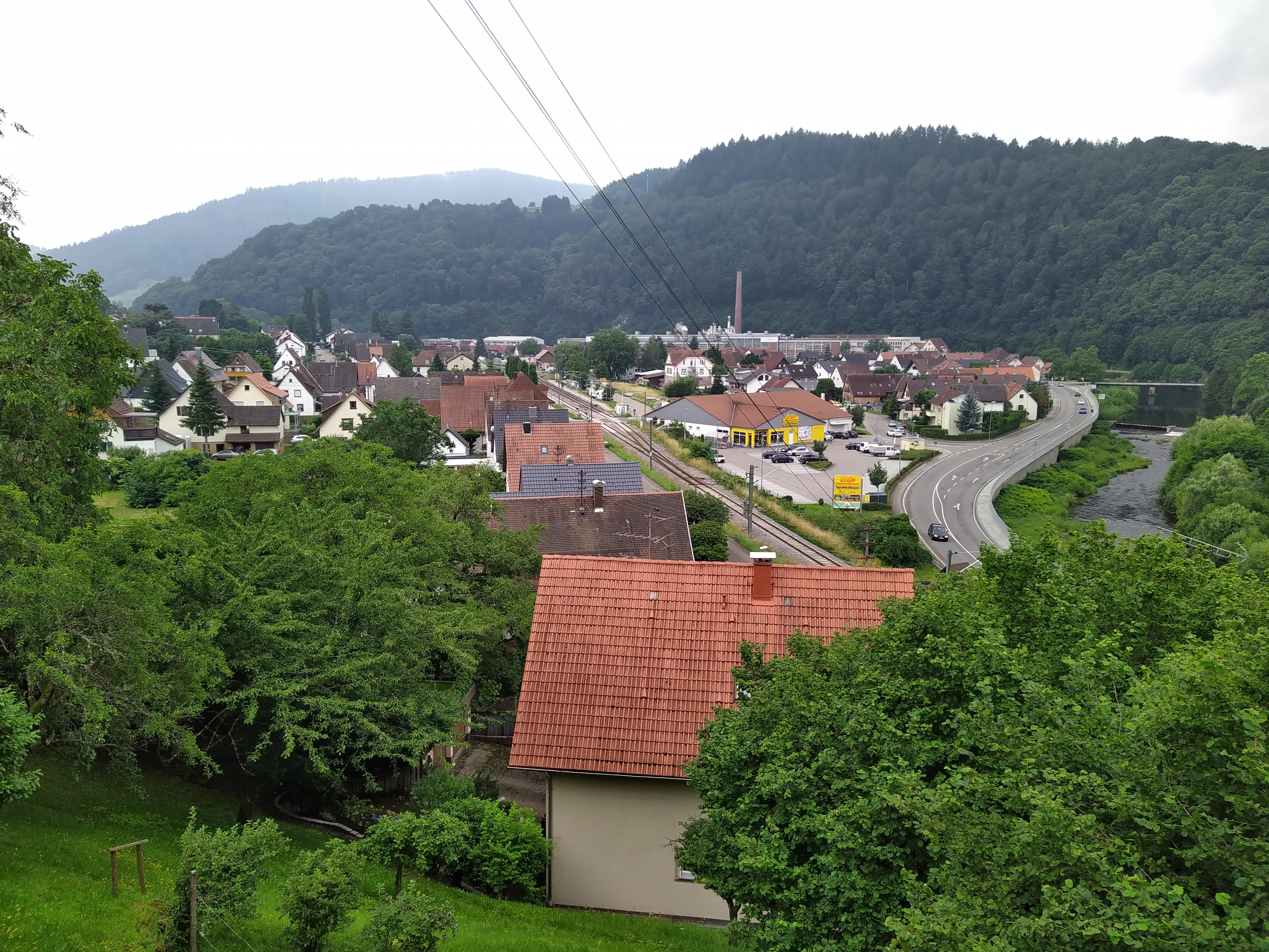
- View over Hilpertsau

- Coat of arms
- Interactive map of Hilpertsau
- Location within Germany Location within Baden-Württemberg
- Coordinates: 48°44′20″N 8°20′51″E
- Country: Germany
- State: Baden-Württemberg
- Admin. region: Karlsruhe
- District: Rastatt
- Town: Gernsbach

Area
  - Total: 3.9454 km^{2} (1.5233 sq mi)
- Elevation: 182 m (597 ft)

Population
  - Total: 1,000
  - Density: 250/km^{2} (660/sq mi)
- Time zone: UTC+01:00 (CET)
  - Summer (DST): UTC+02:00 (CEST)
- Postal codes: 76593
- Dialling codes: 07224

Hilpertsau is a village in Baden-Württemberg, Germany. It is administratively part of the town of Gernsbach in the Rastatt district.

== Geography ==
The village is located south of Gernsbach in the Murg Valley.

== History ==
The first documented mention of Hilpertsau is as 'Hilboltzowe' in the year 1339–1340. On April 1, 1970, Hilpertsau merged with Obertsrot to form the Obertsrot community, which was then incorporated into the town of Gernsbach on July 1, 1974.
