= Oos (river) =

River in Germany

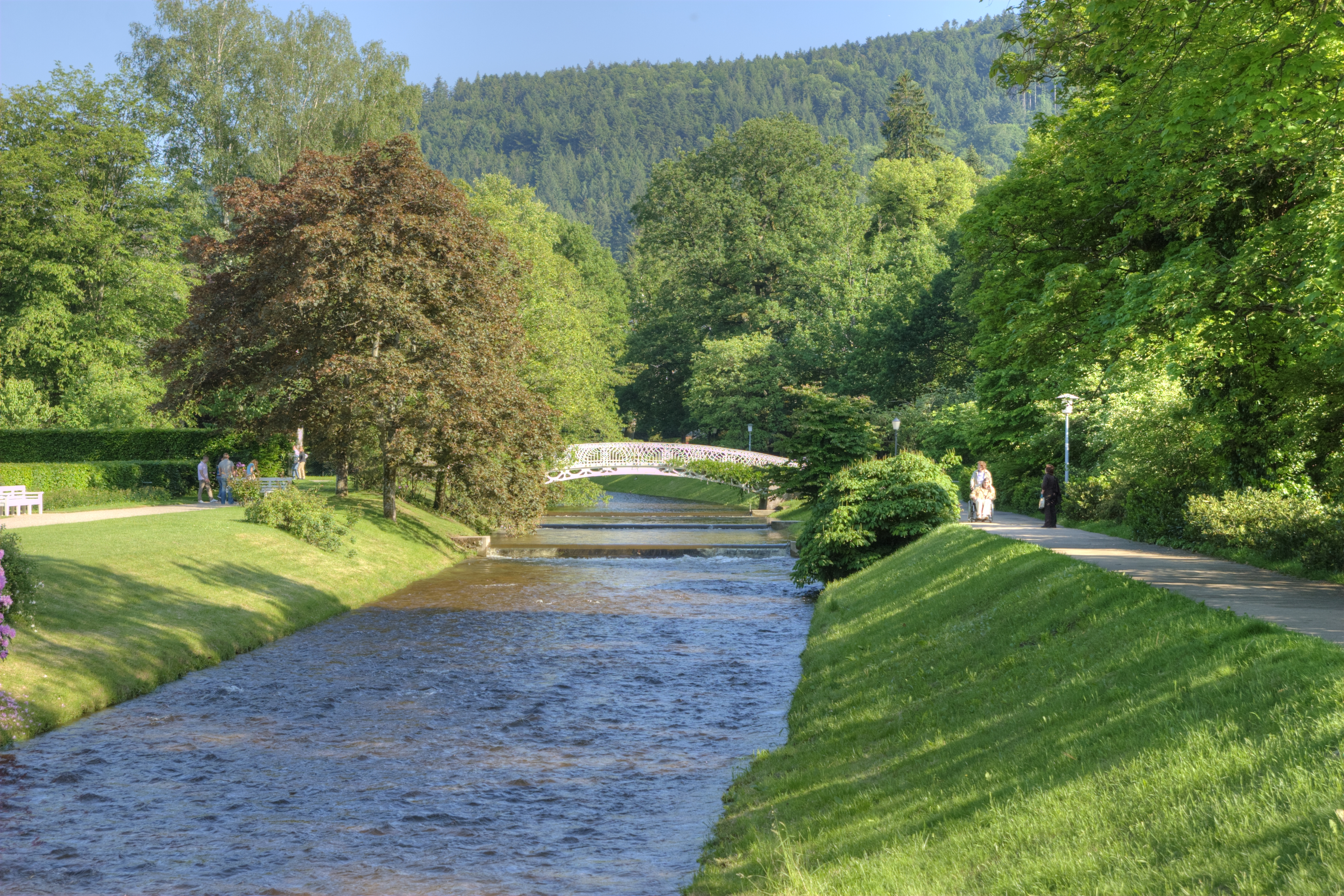
- The Oos in the parks of Lichtentaler Allee, Baden-Baden

Location
- Country: Germany
- State: Baden-Württemberg

Physical characteristics
- Mouth
  - location: Murg
  - coordinates: 48.8569°N 8.2142°E
- Length: 25.3 km (15.7 mi)

Basin features
- Progression: Murg→ Rhine→ North Sea

The Oos (OHS), also called the Oosbach, is a river in Baden-Württemberg, Germany. It starts in the Northern Black Forest, flows through Baden-Baden, and ends in the Murg in Rastatt.

== See also ==
- List of rivers of Baden-Württemberg
