= Walther Eichrodt =

German Old Testament scholar and Protestant theologian

Walther Eichrodt (August 1, 1890 in Gernsbach, Baden – May 20, 1978 in Basel) was a German Old Testament scholar and Protestant theologian.

From 1908 to 1914 he studied theology in Bethel, Greifswald and Heidelberg, obtaining his habilitation at the University of Erlangen in 1918. In 1922 he succeeded Albrecht Alt as an associate professor of history of religions and Old Testament studies at the University of Basel, where from 1934 to 1960 he taught classes as a full professor. In 1953 he was named university rector.

Eichrodt believed that the book of Genesis was added as a prologue to the Old Testament after the writing of Exodus had been completed.

== Published works ==
- Die Quellen der Genesis von neuem untersucht, 1916 (dissertation)
- Die Hoffnung des ewigen Friedens alten Israel – Ein Beitrag zu der Frage nach der israelitischen Eschatologie, 1920 (Habilitation)
- Theologie des Alten Testaments, 3 volumes, 1933–1939; translated into English and published in 2 volumes as Theology of the Old Testament (1961, 1967).
  - Band 1: Gott und Volk, 1934
  - Band 2: Gott und Welt, Verlag der J.C. Hinrichs´schen Buchhandlung, Leipzig 1935
  - Band 3: Gott und Mensch, Verlag der J.C. Hinrichs´schen Buchhandlung, Leipzig 1935
- Das Menschenverständnis des Alten Testaments, Zwingli Verlag, Zürich 1944 and 1947; translated into English and published as Man in the Old Testament (1951).
- Gottes Ruf im Alten Testament: Die alttestamentliche Botschaft im Lichte des Evangeliums, Zwingli Verlag, Zürich 1951
- Das Gottesbild des Alten Testaments, Calwer Verlag, Stuttgart 1956
- Der Heilige in Israel. Jesaja 1-12, Calwer Verlag, Stuttgart 1960 (3. edition 1988, ISBN 978-3-7668-0036-7)
- Homosexualität in evangelischer Sicht, Aussaat, Wuppertal 1965
- Der Herr der Geschichte. Jesaja 13-23 und 28-39, Calwer Verlag, Stuttgart 1967 (2. edition 1988, ISBN 978-3-7668-0038-1)
- Religionsgeschichte Israels, Francke, Bern und München 1969
- Gott im Alten Testament, Brunnen Verlag, Gießen und Basel 1977, ISBN 978-3-7655-0465-5
- Der Prophet Hesekiel, Kapitel 1–18, Teilband 22/1, Das Alte Testament Deutsch (ATD), Vandenhoeck & Ruprecht 1984, (5. edition, 1986, ISBN 978-3-525-51208-1)
- Der Prophet Hesekiel, Kapitel 19–48, Teilband 22/2, Das Alte Testament Deutsch (ATD), Vandenhoeck & Ruprecht 1984 (3. edition, ISBN 978-3-5255-1211-1); English translation by Cosslett Quin (1970).
