= Obertsrot =

- Stadtteil of Gernsbach
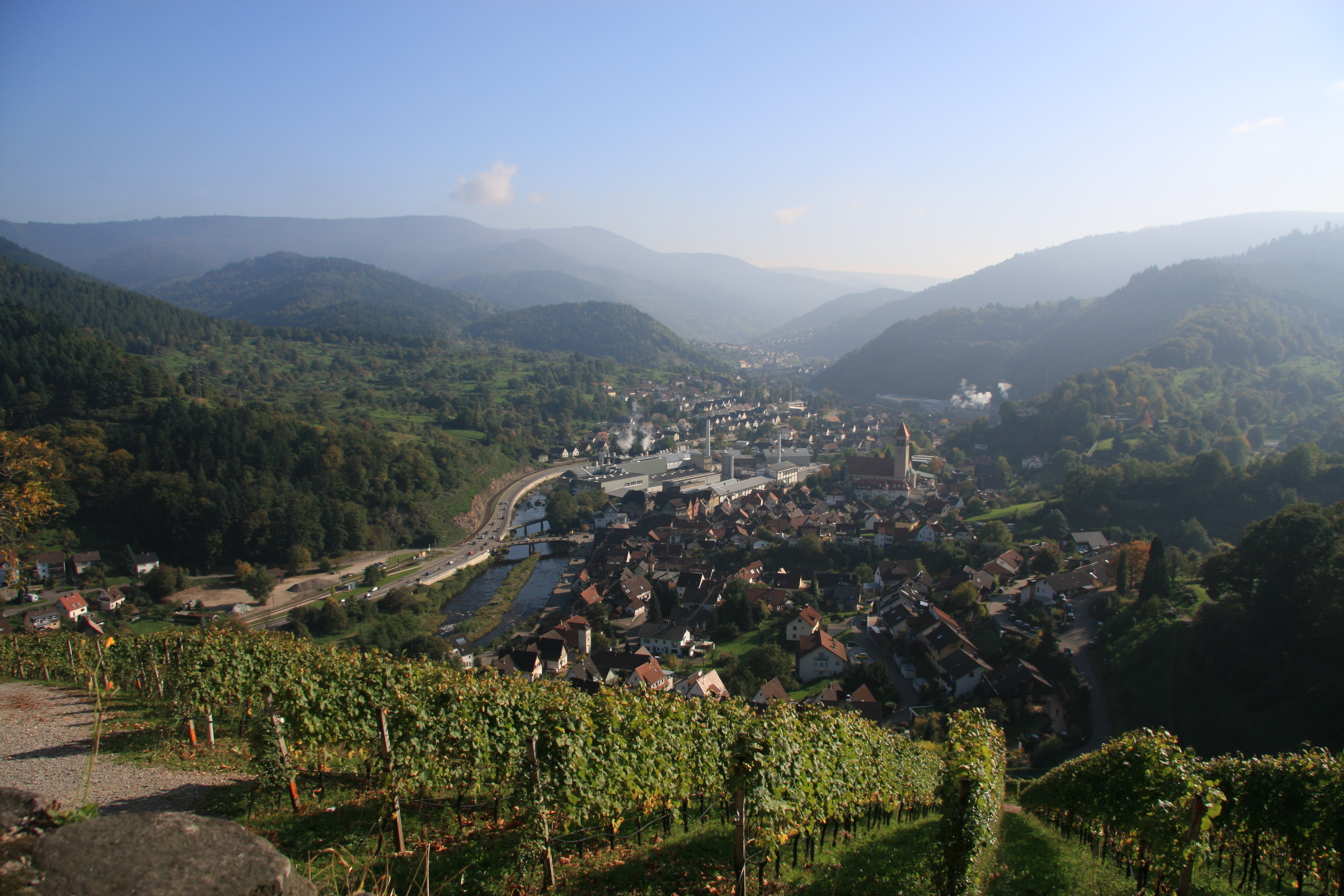
- View from Schloss Eberstein southwards over Obertsrot into the Murg Valley

- Coat of arms
- Interactive map of Obertsrot
- Location within Germany Location within Baden-Württemberg
- Coordinates: 48°44′41″N 8°20′47″E
- Country: Germany
- State: Baden-Württemberg
- Admin. region: Karlsruhe
- District: Rastatt
- Town: Gernsbach

Area
  - Total: 8.3283 km^{2} (3.2156 sq mi)
- Elevation: 176 m (577 ft)

Population
  - Total: 1,100
  - Density: 130/km^{2} (340/sq mi)
- Time zone: UTC+01:00 (CET)
  - Summer (DST): UTC+02:00 (CEST)
- Postal codes: 76593
- Dialling codes: 07224

Obertsrot is a village in Baden-Württemberg, Germany. It is administratively part of the town of Gernsbach in the Rastatt district.

== Geography ==
The village is located south of Gernsbach in the Murg Valley. The main settlement lies west of the Murg River.

== History ==
The first mention of Obertsrot is in a document from 1377, held in the State Archives in Karlsruhe. On April 1, 1970, Obertsrot merged with Hilpertsau to form the Obertsrot community, which was then incorporated into the town of Gernsbach on July 1, 1974.

=== Coat of Arms ===
The Obertsrot coat of arms depicts two diagonally crossed pike poles with their tips turned outwards, with three red roses in between them. This design is ringed by a blue knotted rope.

Coat of arms of Obertsrot

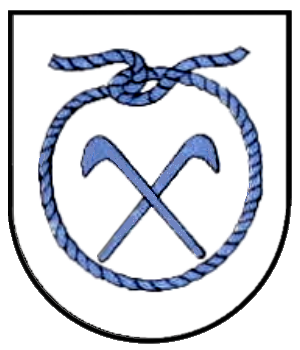
Former coat of arms of Obertsrot
