= Forbach (Baden) =

- Municipality
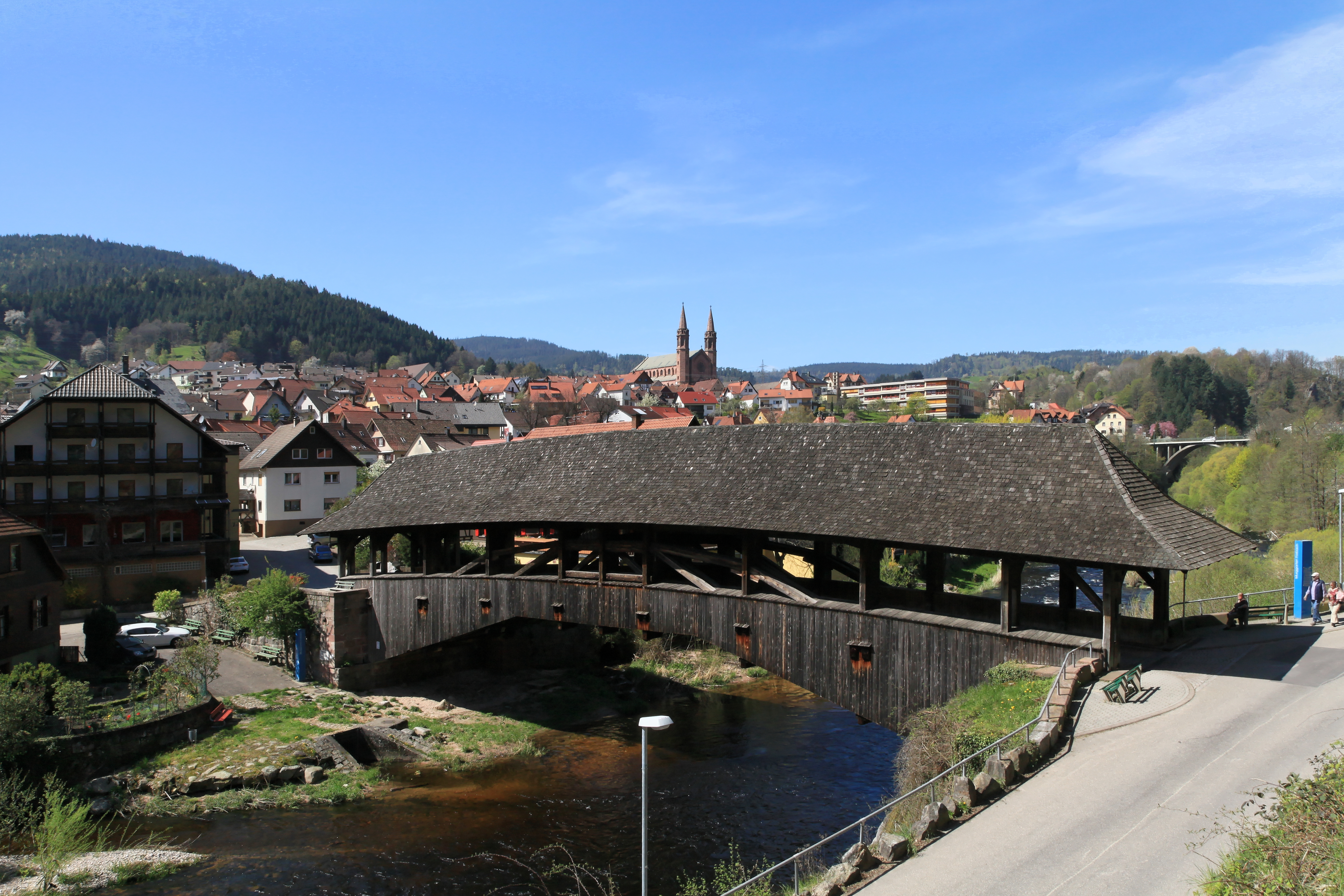
- The covered wooden bridge of Forbach

- Coat of arms

- Location of Forbach within Rastatt district
- Interactive map of Forbach
- Location within Germany Location within Baden-Württemberg
- Coordinates: 48°40′50″N 08°21′30″E
- Country: Germany
- State: Baden-Württemberg
- Admin. region: Karlsruhe
- District: Rastatt
- Subdivisions: 10 Ortsteile

Government
  - Mayor (2022–30): Robert Stiebler

Area
  - Total: 131.82 km^{2} (50.90 sq mi)
- Elevation: 332 m (1,089 ft)

Population (2025-12-31)
  - Total: 4,571
  - Density: 34.68/km^{2} (89.81/sq mi)
- Time zone: UTC+01:00 (CET)
  - Summer (DST): UTC+02:00 (CEST)
- Postal codes: 76596
- Dialling codes: 07228
- Vehicle registration: RA
- Website: www.forbach.de

Forbach (/fɔːrˈbɑːk/ for-BAHK, German: [ˈfɔʁbax]) is a village and municipality in Baden-Württemberg, Germany. It lies in the district of Rastatt. It is located in the Murg river valley, in the northern part of the Black Forest mountains. Forbach is further broken down into the following districts: Langenbrand, Bermersbach, Gausbach, Hundsbach, Herrenwies, Kirschbaumwasen, Erbersbronn, Raumünzach and Schwarzenbach.

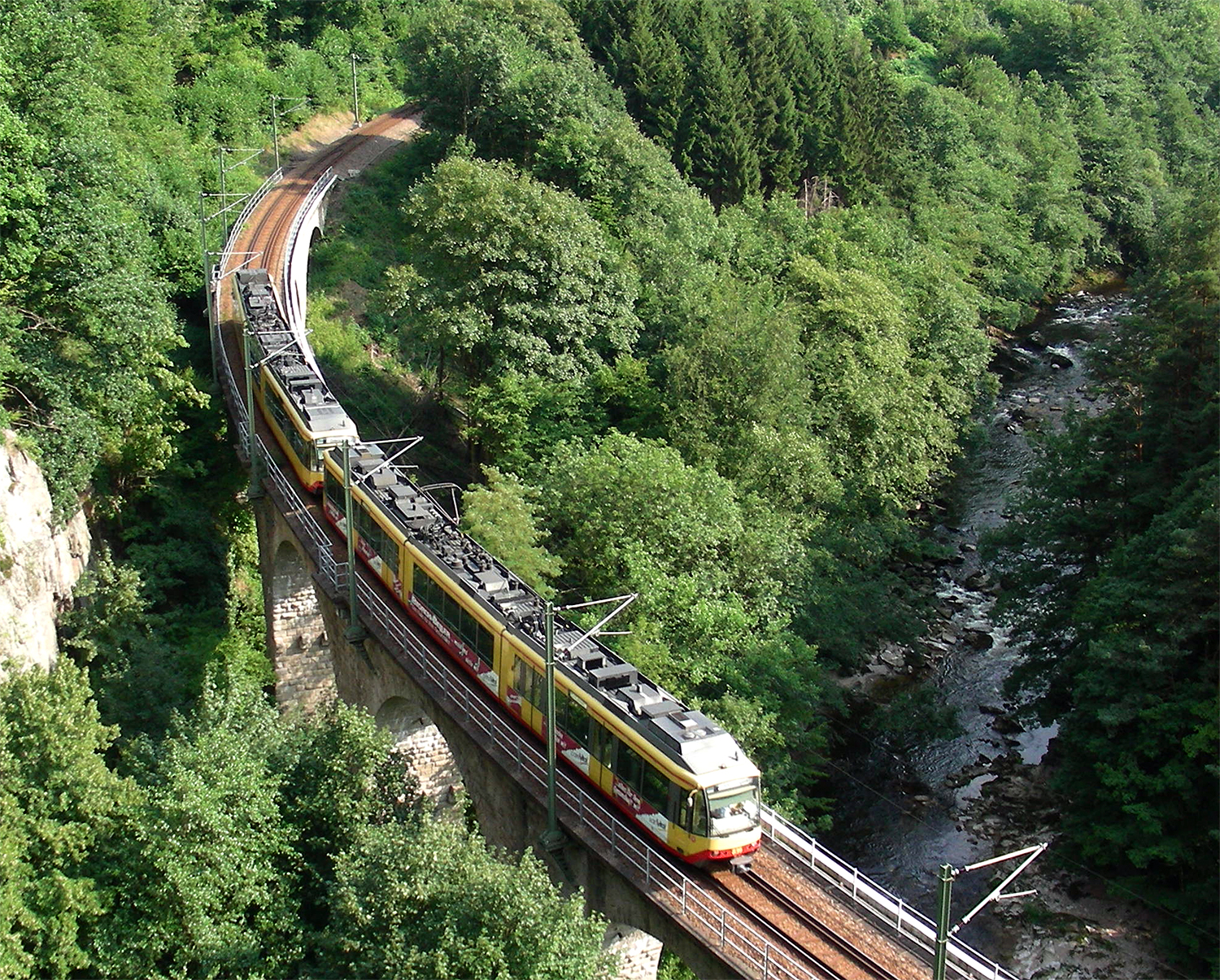
Bridge of the Murg Valley Railway near Forbach

The tarn of Schurmsee lies within the municipality at a height of 794 metres.

== Mayors ==
- 1998-2014: Kuno Kußmann (CDU)
- 2014-2022: Katrin Buhrke (lawyer)
- 2022-now: Robert Stiebler

== Climate ==
The climate in this area is meditteran and has mild differences between highs and lows, and there is precipitation year round. The Köppen Climate Classification subtype for this climate is "Cfb" (Marine West Coast Climate/Oceanic climate).

Climate data for Baden-Baden (1991–2020 normals, extremes 1949–present)
Month	Jan	Feb	Mar	Apr	May	Jun	Jul	Aug	Sep	Oct	Nov	Dec	Year
Record high °C (°F)	18.4 (65.1)	21.6 (70.9)	27.0 (80.6)	30.8 (87.4)	34.5 (94.1)	38.1 (100.6)	41.2 (106.2)	41.3 (106.3)	33.9 (93.0)	27.6 (81.7)	20.4 (68.7)	19.0 (66.2)	41.3 (106.3)
Mean maximum °C (°F)	13.1 (55.6)	14.6 (58.3)	18.3 (64.9)	22.8 (73.0)	28.8 (83.8)	31.8 (89.2)	32.3 (90.1)	32.1 (89.8)	26.7 (80.1)	22.2 (72.0)	15.8 (60.4)	12.9 (55.2)	32.3 (90.1)
Mean daily maximum °C (°F)	3.6 (38.5)	5.1 (41.2)	9.4 (48.9)	14.7 (58.5)	18.9 (66.0)	22.7 (72.9)	25.3 (77.5)	24.6 (76.3)	19.4 (66.9)	13.4 (56.1)	7.5 (45.5)	4.2 (39.6)	14.1 (57.3)
Daily mean °C (°F)	1.2 (34.2)	2.2 (36.0)	5.2 (41.4)	9.4 (48.9)	14.8 (58.6)	18.1 (64.6)	19.9 (67.8)	19.4 (66.9)	15.1 (59.2)	9.4 (48.9)	4.7 (40.5)	1.9 (35.4)	10.1 (50.2)
Mean daily minimum °C (°F)	−2.7 (27.1)	−2.1 (28.2)	−0.4 (31.3)	2.1 (35.8)	9.2 (48.6)	13.8 (56.8)	15.7 (60.3)	14.1 (57.4)	9.5 (49.1)	4.1 (39.4)	−0.8 (30.6)	−2.1 (28.2)	5.0 (41.1)
Mean minimum °C (°F)	−12.8 (9.0)	−10.6 (12.9)	−7.0 (19.4)	−3.2 (26.2)	1.0 (33.8)	4.3 (39.7)	6.6 (43.9)	7.0 (44.6)	4.0 (39.2)	0.6 (33.1)	−5.5 (22.1)	−11.9 (10.6)	−12.8 (9.0)
Record low °C (°F)	−22.5 (−8.5)	−24.8 (−12.6)	−19.3 (−2.7)	−11.3 (11.7)	−3.4 (25.9)	1.2 (34.2)	4.4 (39.9)	2.3 (36.1)	−1.1 (30.0)	−6.1 (21.0)	−14.2 (6.4)	−20.8 (−5.4)	−24.8 (−12.6)
Average precipitation mm (inches)	119.3 (4.70)	120.1 (4.73)	116.2 (4.57)	105.8 (4.17)	93.5 (3.68)	78.9 (3.11)	67.9 (2.67)	88.1 (3.47)	100.1 (3.94)	111.1 (4.37)	147.1 (5.79)	158.1 (6.22)	1,306.2 (51.42)
Average extreme snow depth cm (inches)	18.5 (7.3)	11.2 (4.4)	6.4 (2.5)	1.7 (0.7)	0 (0)	0 (0)	0 (0)	0 (0)	0.2 (0.1)	2.9 (1.1)	7.9 (3.1)	18.9 (7.4)	18.9 (7.4)
Average precipitation days (≥ 0.1 mm)	21.7	16.4	16.2	13.5	14.8	10.4	8.8	13.6	15.7	19.0	22.9	23.1	196.1
Average relative humidity (%)	94.1	88.3	78.3	74.0	70.9	64.2	57.7	65.4	84.2	90.2	95.0	95.8	79.8
Mean monthly sunshine hours	32.2	56.6	101.3	157.4	189.4	230.7	242.7	224.3	123.5	87.6	36.3	26.2	1,508.2
Source: Deutscher Wetterdienst / SKlima.de
