= Gernsbach =

- Town
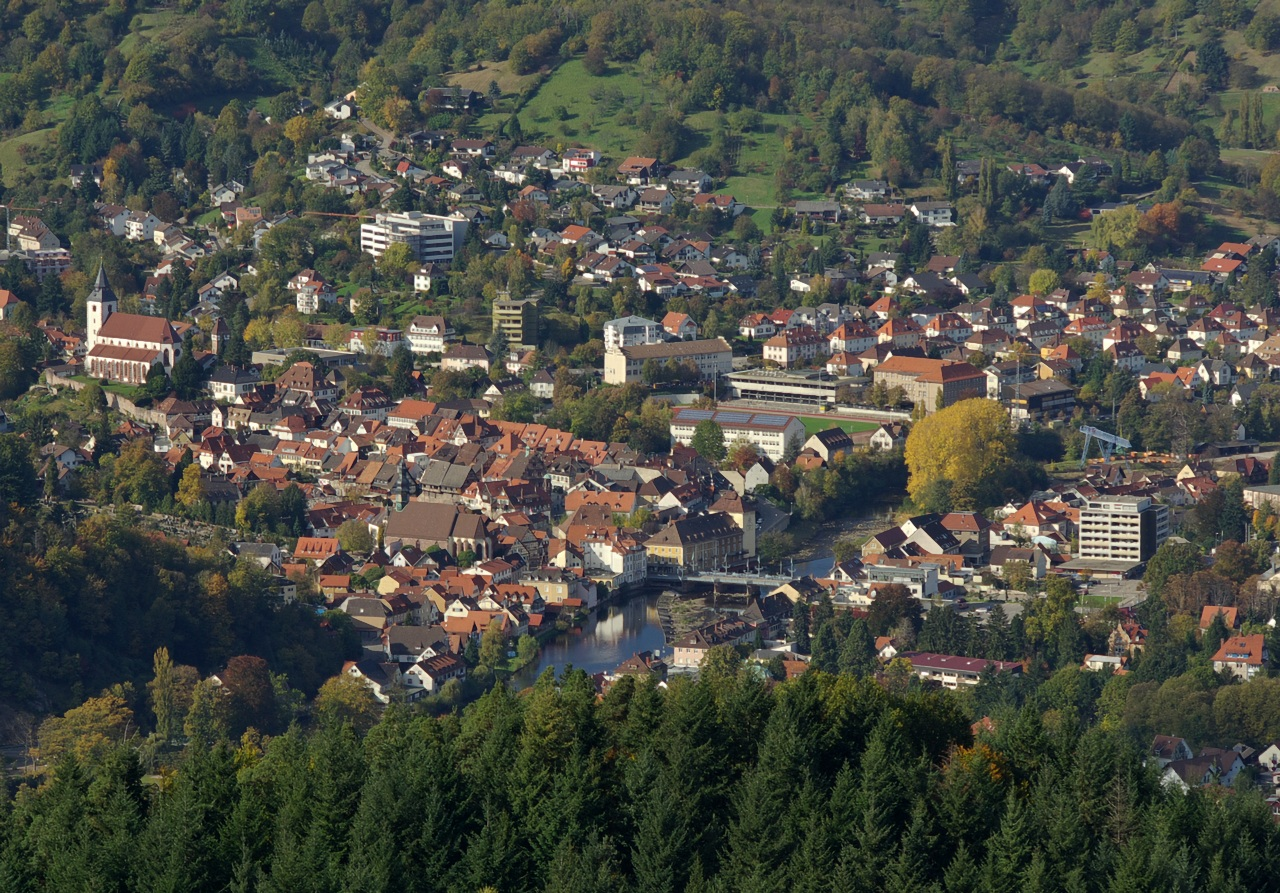
- View of the old town

- Coat of arms

- Location of Gernsbach within Rastatt district
- Interactive map of Gernsbach
- Location within Germany Location within Baden-Württemberg
- Coordinates: 48°45′48″N 8°20′03″E
- Country: Germany
- State: Baden-Württemberg
- Admin. region: Karlsruhe
- District: Rastatt

Government
  - Mayor (2017–25): Julian Christ (SPD)

Area
  - Total: 82.03 km^{2} (31.67 sq mi)
- Elevation: 174 m (571 ft)

Population (2025-12-31)
  - Total: 14,264
  - Density: 173.9/km^{2} (450.4/sq mi)
- Time zone: UTC+01:00 (CET)
  - Summer (DST): UTC+02:00 (CEST)
- Postal codes: 76593
- Dialling codes: 07224
- Vehicle registration: RA
- Website: gernsbach.de

Gernsbach (German pronunciation: [ˈɡɛʁnsbax]) is a town in the district of Rastatt, in Baden-Württemberg, Germany. It is located on the river Murg, 7 km (4.35 mi) east of Baden-Baden in the Black Forest. Twin towns are Baccarat in France and Pergola, Marche in Italy. The town is the historic centre of the lower Murg Valley and forms a central place of mid-size with Gaggenau. It is located in the Region Mittlerer Oberrhein, one of the twelve spatial planning regions of Baden-Württemberg. Gernsbach is an officially recognised climatic spa with a historic centre. Furthermore, Gernsbach is noted for its paper industry and Paper Centre, a service provider in the field of training, staff qualification and management consultancy for the German and Swiss paper and pulp industry.

== Geography ==
=== Geographical position ===
Gernsbach is located in the northern part of the Black Forest on both banks of the river Murg at 150 to 988 meters above the sea level. In the west the 668 m high mountain Merkur provides a distinctive landscape. In the east there is the 908 m high mountain Teufelsmühle.

=== Area ===
The local subdistrict area of Gernsbach including all quarters is 8208,86 hectares of which most is covered by forest areas – 6628,00 hectares (81% of the total area). That is more than twice as much as the average ratio in Baden-Württemberg. Settlement and traffic areas make up 6% - less than half of the average. 12% of the area used for agriculture.

=== Quarters ===
The core city is divided into “to the right of the Murg” (including: Kelterberg, Entensee, Kolonie and Nord) and “to the left of the Murg” (including: Klingele, Waldbach, Faltergass, Heppeler, Walheimer Hof, Stadtbuckel, Siedlung, Hahnbachweg, Panoramaweg and Weinau) In the 20th century following townships were suburbanized:

- Scheuern (in 1936)

After the redivision of local government in the 1970s

- Lautenbach (in 1973)
- Hilpertsau (in 1974)
- Obertsrot (in 1974)
- Staufenberg (in 1974)
- Reichental (in 1975) (doubling the total subdistrict area of Gernsbach)

followed.

Coat of Arms of the quarters

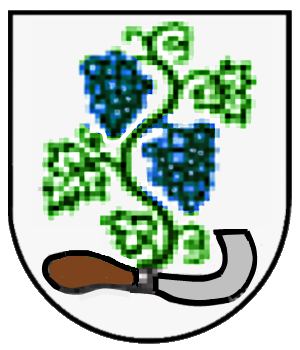
Scheuern

Hilpertsau

Lautenbach

Obertsrot

Staufenberg

Reichental

=== Neighbouring towns ===
These townships and towns border on Gernsbach:

- in the north: Gaggenau, Loffenau, Bad Herrenalb and Dobel
- in the east: Bad Wildbad and Enzklösterle
- in the south: Forbach and Weisenbach
- in the west: Baden-Baden

== History ==
=== Beginnings ===
A permanent settlement of Gernsbach before the 12th century is not verified. At the beginning of the 12th century the Counts of Eberstein bought the “predium” Rotenfels thus allowing the initial settlement of the lower Murg valley. From Rotenfels the counts of Eberstein ordered to uproot the wooded and swampy valley and to found new settlements. By 1200 the route Loffenau–Scheuern–Gernsbach–Staufenberg was established. In an ebersteinian inheritance document Gernsbach is first mentioned in written form in 1219 as ‘’Genrespach’’. At that time there was already a differentiation between a Marktdorf (a settlement which had the right to run a market) and a Kirchdorf (a settlement which had the right to build a church). Gernsbach (also called “Hof” – ‘’a little settlement of farmers’’) was a Kirchdorf at that time, being located to the left of the Murg in the south of the Waldbach on the ebersteinian allodium. The local church was the preceding building of today’s St.-Jakobskirche. To the north of the Waldbach was a Marktdorf on the grounds of the Diocese of Speyer located on a spur, thus having an ideal location for the construction of a fortification.

== Notable people ==
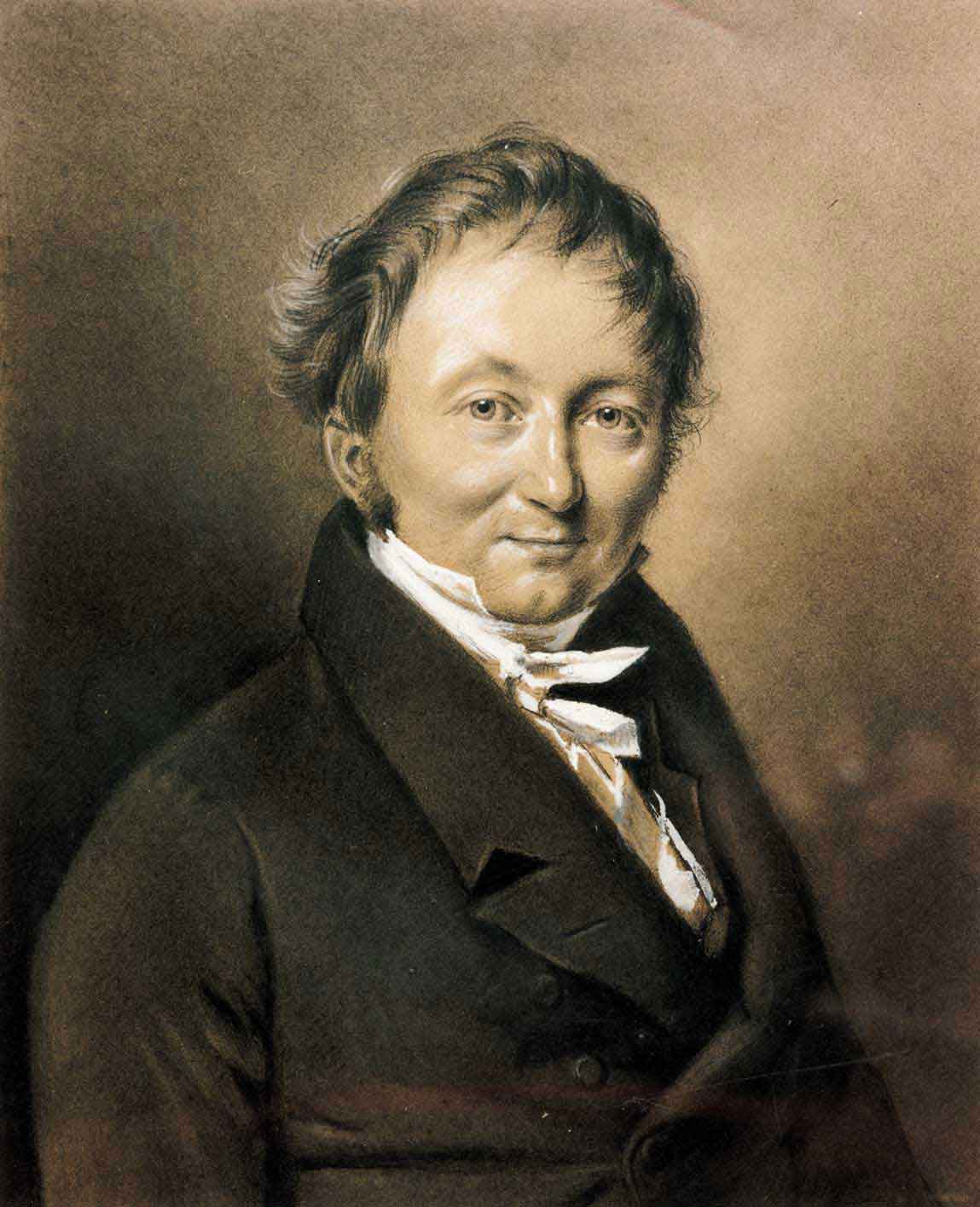
Karl Drais

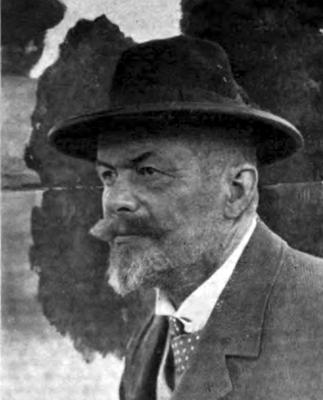
Ludwig Dill

- William IV of Eberstein (1497–1562), officially introduced the Reformation in Eberstein in 1556
- Karl Drais (1785–1851), studied forestry, inventor, lived here in 1794; "the father of the bicycle"
- Karl Friedrich Moest (1838-1923), sculptor.
- Ludwig Dill (1848–1940), ship and landscape painter
- Heinrich Funck, (DE Wiki) (1853–1932), philologist and historian, director of the Bürgerschule
- Walther Eichrodt, (1890–1978), Protestant theologian
- Scipio Colombo (1910–2002), Italian baritone, died locally
- Heinz Schimmelpfennig (1919–2010), actor and radio playwright, died locally
- Georg Ackermann (born 1972), long jumper

== Gallery ==
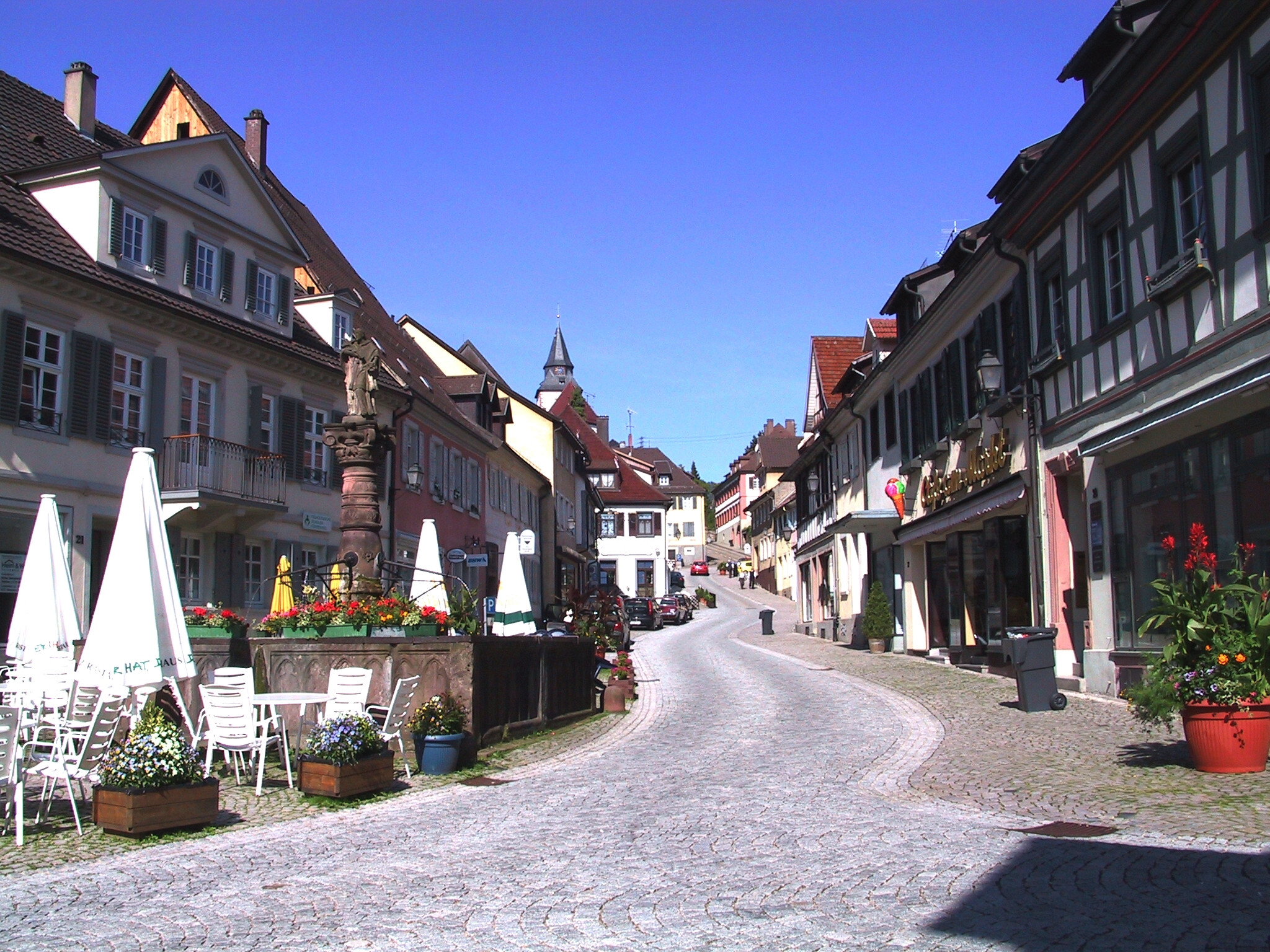
The Marketplace

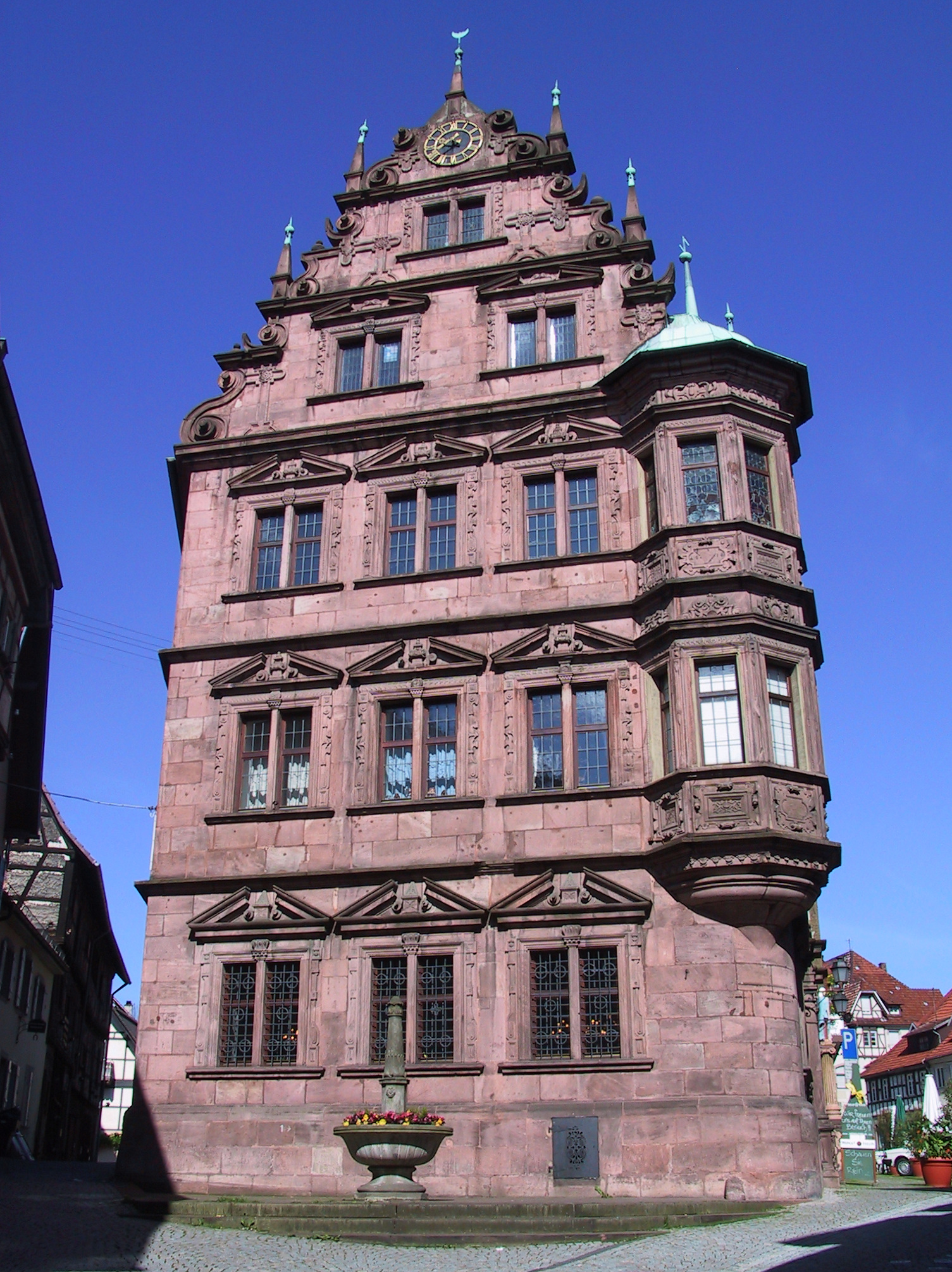
Altes Rathaus, or Old Town Hall, a palace built in 1617-18 for a rich timber merchant

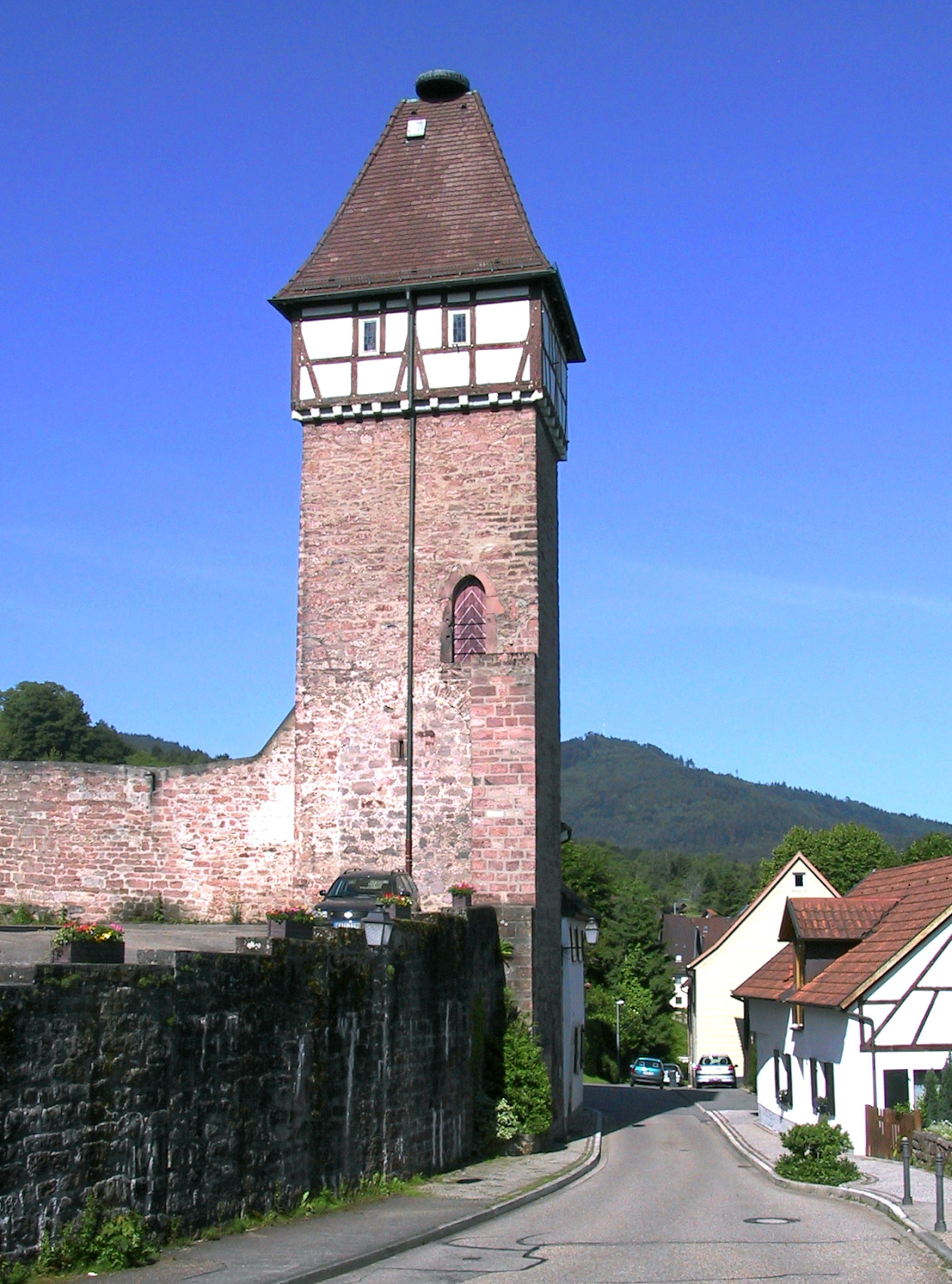
Storchenturm, or Stork Tower, part of the ancient city wall

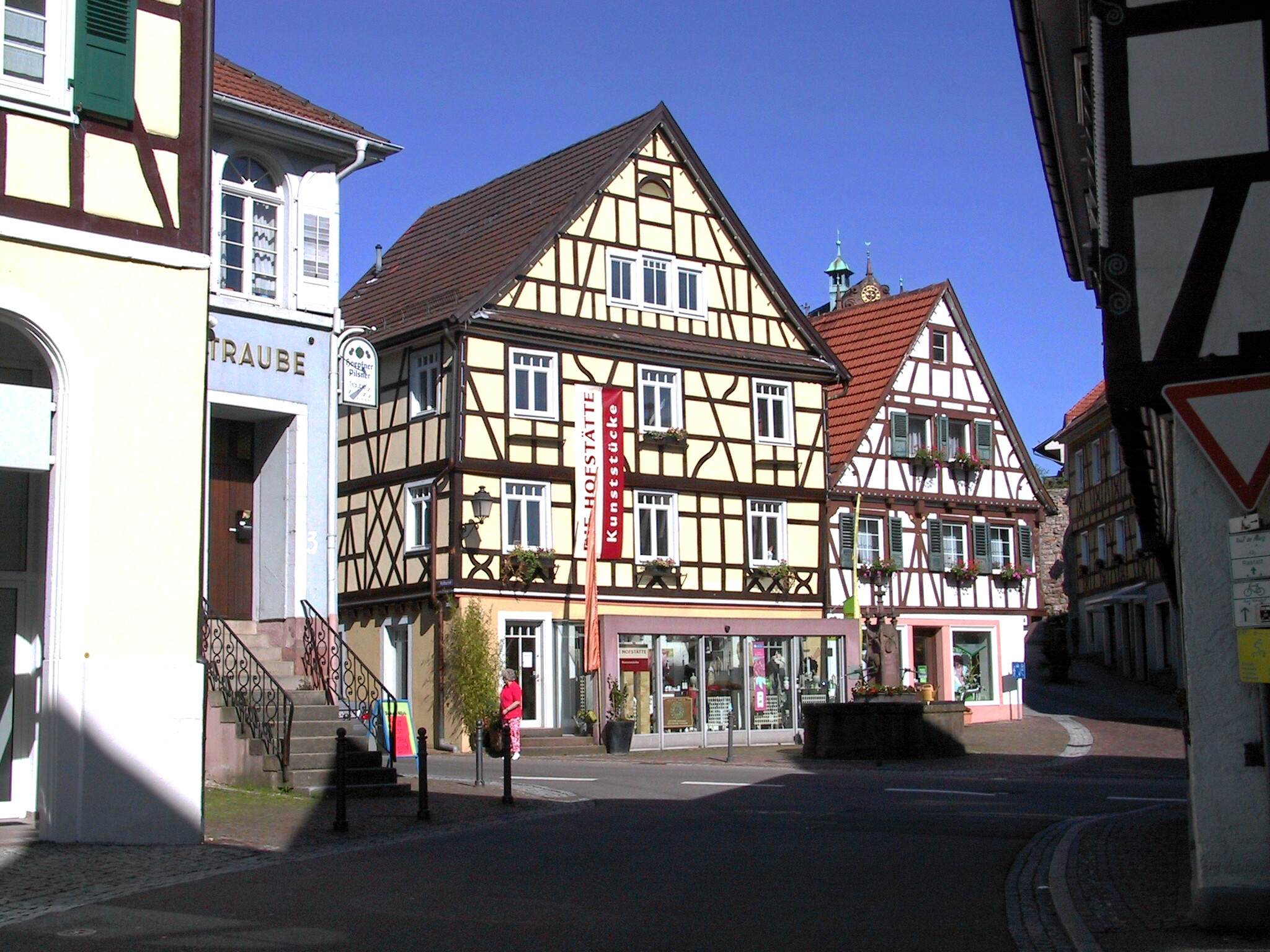
Hofstätte, the entrance to the Old Town

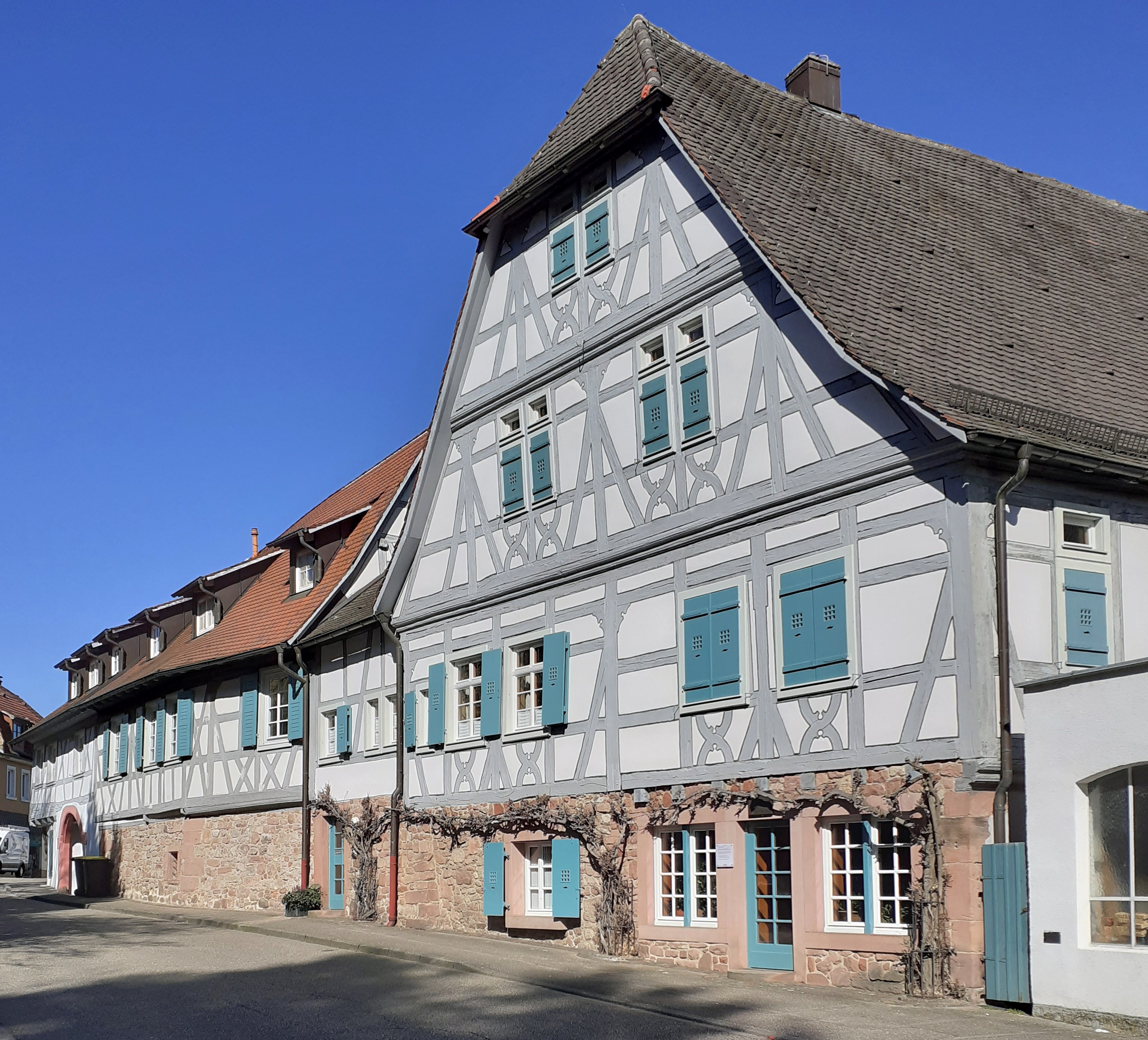
Alter Amtshof, a former administration building established in 1556

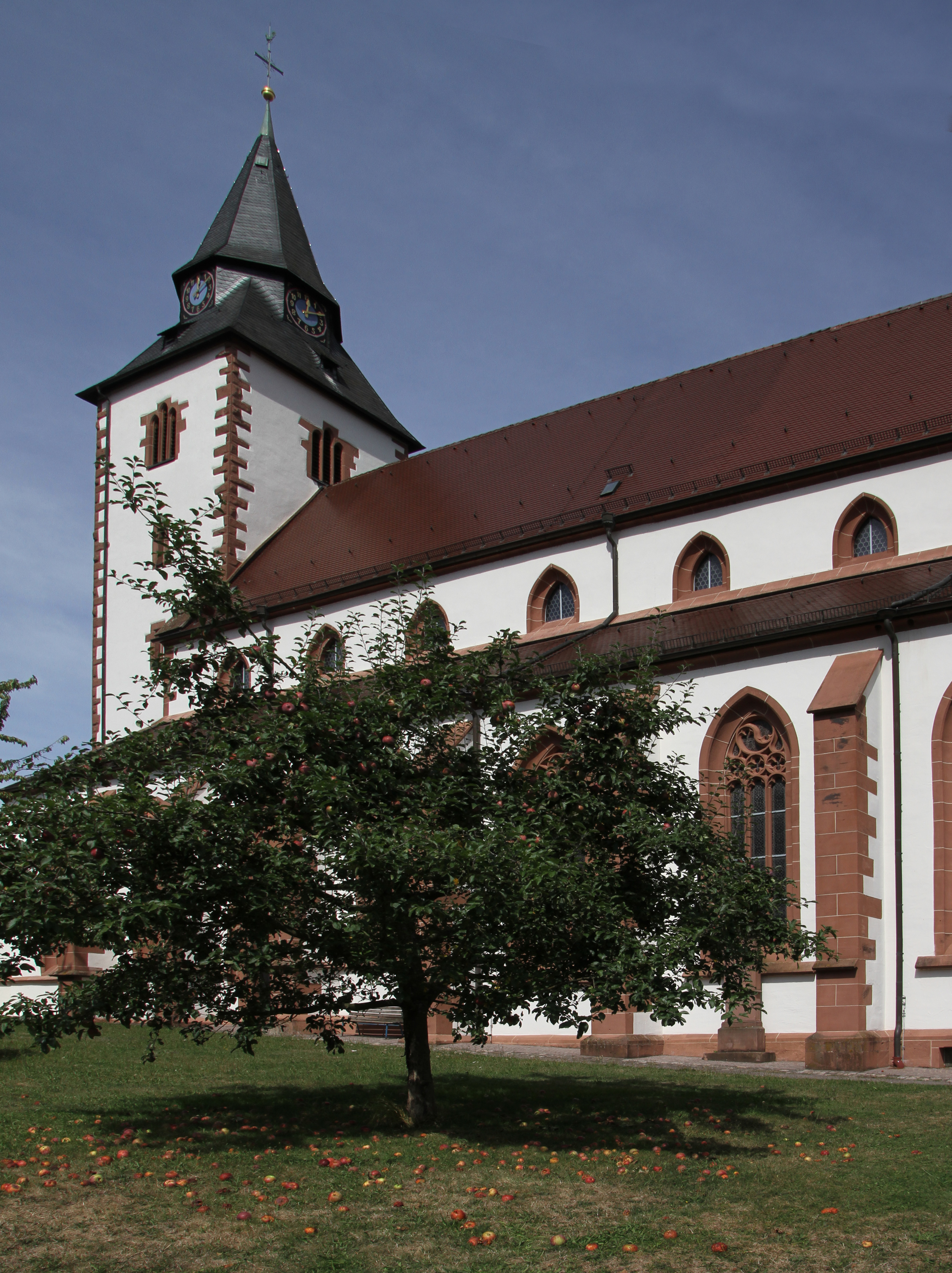
Church of Our Lady

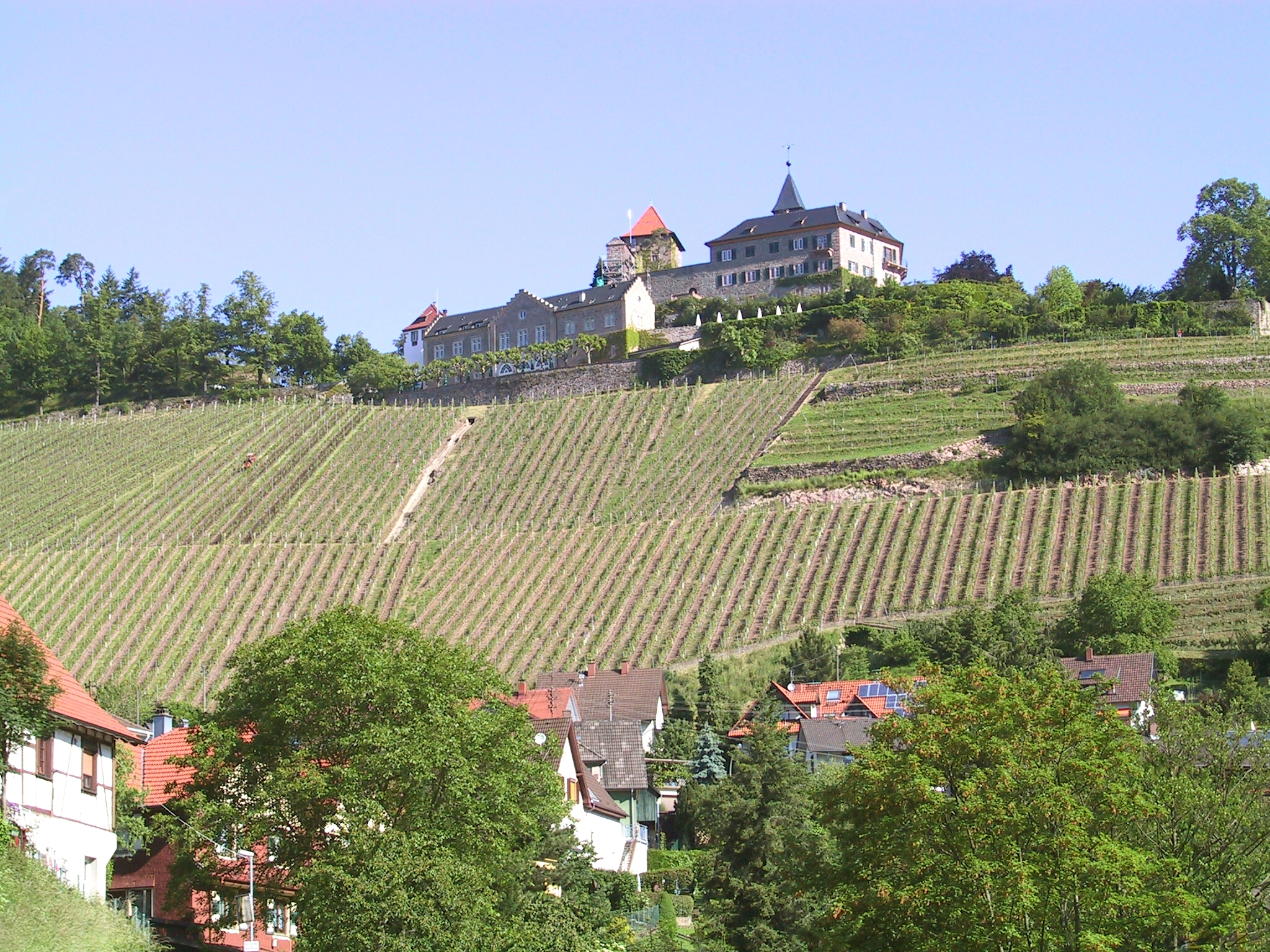
Eberstein Castle with vineyard
