= Murg (Northern Black Forest) =

River and tributary in Germany

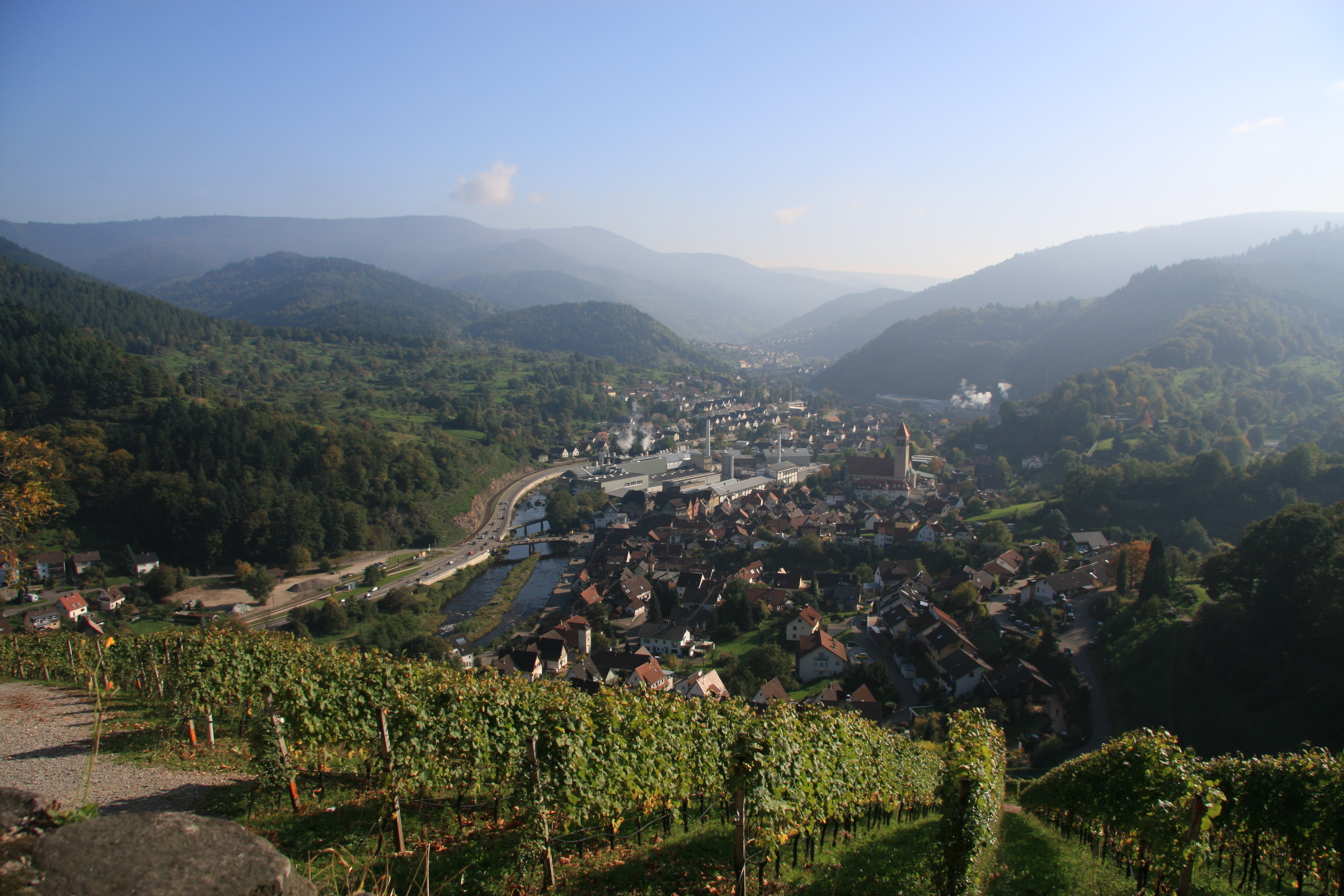
- The wooded, 700-metre-deep Murg valley with industry and vineyards (View from Schloss Eberstein looking south to Obertsrot)

Location
- Country: Germany
- State: Baden-Württemberg
- Districts: Freudenstadt and Rastatt
- Reference no.: DE: 236

Physical characteristics
- Source
  - location: Source: in the Northern Black Forest: confluence of the Rechtmurg and Rotmurg in Obertal
  - coordinates: 48°31′57″N 8°17′18″E
  - elevation: ca. 595 m above sea level (NHN) (confluence) ca. 870 m u. NHN (Murgursprung; Rechtmurg) ca. 915 m u. NHN (Rotmurgbrunnen; Rotmurg)
- Mouth
  - location: near Steinmauern into the Upper Rhine
  - coordinates: 48°55′09″N 8°09′53″E
  - elevation: ca. 110 m above sea level (NHN)
- Length: 79.6 km (49.5 mi)
- Basin size: 605 km^{2} (234 sq mi)

Basin features
- Progression: Rhine→ North Sea
- Landmarks: Large towns: Gaggenau, Rastatt; Small towns: Gernsbach; Villages: Baiersbronn, Forbach
- Population: 178,850
- Tributaries
  - left: Tonbach, Schönmünz, Raumünzach, Oos (Nordarm)
  - right: Ilgenbach, Forbach, Sasbach
- Waterbodies: Reservoirs: Kirschbaumwasen Retention Basin, Forbach Compensation Basin

The Murg (German pronunciation: [mʊʁk]) is an 80.2-kilometre-long river (including its headstream, the Rechtmurg) and tributary of the Rhine in Baden-Württemberg, Germany. It flows through the Northern Black Forest into the Upper Rhine Plain, crossing the counties of Freudenstadt and Rastatt.

== Geography ==
=== Course ===
The Murg valley is one of the largest and deepest valleys in the Black Forest (up to over 700 metres deep) and generally runs in a northerly direction. It separates the precipitation-rich main crest of the Northern Black Forest, including the Hornisgrinde (1,164 m), to the west, from the densely forested bunter sandstone plateaux in the east.

The Murg originates from 2 large headstreams in the western part of the municipality of Baiersbronn. Below the Schliffkopf at about 870 m above sea level (NHN), the main headstream of the Right Murg (Rechtmurg) is formed by the Schurbach stream and Tränkenteich pond, a little above the Murgursprung ("Murg Source"). The other western headstream is the Red Murg (Rotmurg), whose source is the Red Murg Spring (Rotmurgbrunnen, also 915 m) which leaves the pass summit of Ruhestein (915 m) and is fed by brooks such as the Finsterbächle and Muckenbächle.

From the confluence of its two headstreams at about 595 m the Murg flows southeast through the valley of Mitteltal to Baiersbronn, where it swings into line with the Forbach which joins from the south. From here it is followed by the B 462 and the Murg Valley Railway. Initially it runs northeastwards to Klosterreichenbach, but thereafter it heads north-northwest. In the wide Wiesental valley it passes the villages of Röt, Huzenbach and Schönmünzach. After flowing through a narrow, sparsely populated and steep-sided gorge the river passes a rocky section in which are the settlements of Forbach, Gausbach, Langenbrand and Au im Murgtal. In its slowly widening valley, the villages of Weisenbach, Hilpertsau, Obertsrot, Scheuern, the town of Gernsbach and finally the village of Hörden follow in quick succession. Between the now gently rising hillsides the Murg runs northwest through Ottenau, past the industrial town of Gaggenau and the villages of Bad Rotenfels, Oberndorf, Bischweier and Kuppenheim, where it reaches the Upper Rhine Plain. Here it crosses under the A 5 motorway near Niederbühl and, in the area of Rastatt, the B 3, the Rhine Railway the Mannheim–Basel railway (Rhine Valley Railway). Below Rheinau the Murg empties into the Rhine near Steinmauern at about 110 m at Rhine kilometre number 344.5.

On the French side the Sauer from the North Vosges joins the Rhine almost opposite the Murg.

=== Waterbody data ===
From the confluence of its two headstreams (Rechtmurg and Rotmurg) in Baiersbronn-Obertal to its mouth on the Rhine the Murg is 72.350 km (~ 72.4 km) long. Together with the Rotmurg which rises at the Rotmurgbrunnen near Ruhestein it is 79.661 km (~ 79.7 km) long and together with the Rechtmurg which begins on the Schliffkopf at the Murgursprung and has a length of 7.881 km it is 80.231 km (~ 80.2 km) long.

The catchment of the Murg covers 617 km^{2}.

In relation to its catchment the Murg has a high volumetric flow (18.4 m^{3}/s). The catchment areas of the Murg headstreams and its tributary, the Schönmünzach, have an area flow rate of 50 L/s.km^{2}, the highest in Baden-Württemberg.

=== Natural regions ===
The Murg flows from south to north through four very different valley landscapes.

- Its upper section in the area of Baiersbronn is a typical Black Forest valley with broad meadow bottoms and villages once dominated by agriculture. Many of the side valleys have a typical trough valley shape with steep sides.
- The middle section of the Murg valley is a lonely, forest gorge with granite crags and a gradient of up to 3.3%, very much like a mountain stream. Until 1918, the Murg, together with the Raumünzach, its biggest tributary, a well known whitewater river due to its weight of water. Since then, the hydroelectric potential of the river has been used in the Murg Power Station. It lies just above Forbach, the main settlement in this part of the valley.
- The lower Murg valley is, like the Wiesental, one of the industrial corridors of the Black Forest. The valley here is over 700 metres deep, initially with a trackless gorge bottom that increasingly broadens and provides room for a settlement strip of numerous villages and towns. Its historic centre is Gernsbach, also the hub of the paper and cardboard industry of the valley; the largest town has become Gaggenau with its tradition-rich motor manufacturing (including Unimog). The river is accompanied in many places by industrial ditches and from Gernsbach-Nord has been almost entirely canalised. Renaturalisation work was carried out at Bischweier in 2011. The aim was to create a near-natural riverbed with differences in current, substrates and depth, so that a variety of habitats could be created for fish and other small creatures. The riverbed here can be left to grow unfettered.
- Near Kuppenheim the Murg enters the Rhine Plain, where it flows around the centre of Rastatt. In the late 18th and early 19th centuries the course of the Murg in the Rhine Valley was canalised. Immediately before its present confluence on the Rhine near Steinmauern the river's canal cuts through the wetlands of Rastatt's Rhine river meadows. Its confluence was moved about 1.5 kilometres to the northwest in the course of work to straighten the Rhine by Johann Gottfried Tulla.

=== Tributaries ===
The Murg does not flow through the middle of its elongated catchment, but further to the east, so that more and larger tributaries join it from the west than from the east. Its western tributaries included the Tonbach, Schönmünz, Raumünzach and Oos (north branch) and its tributaries from the east include the Forbach and Sasbach.

=== Administrative divisions ===
The old state border between the Kingdom of Württemberg and the Grand Duchy of Baden runs between Baiersbronn-Schönmünzach and Forbach-Kirschbaumwasen. The upper, formerly Württemberg part of the valley belongs today to the county of Freudenstadt. The lower, section, which from the 12th century was ruled by the Ebersteins and later went to Baden, is today part of the county of Rastatt.

=== Towns and villages ===
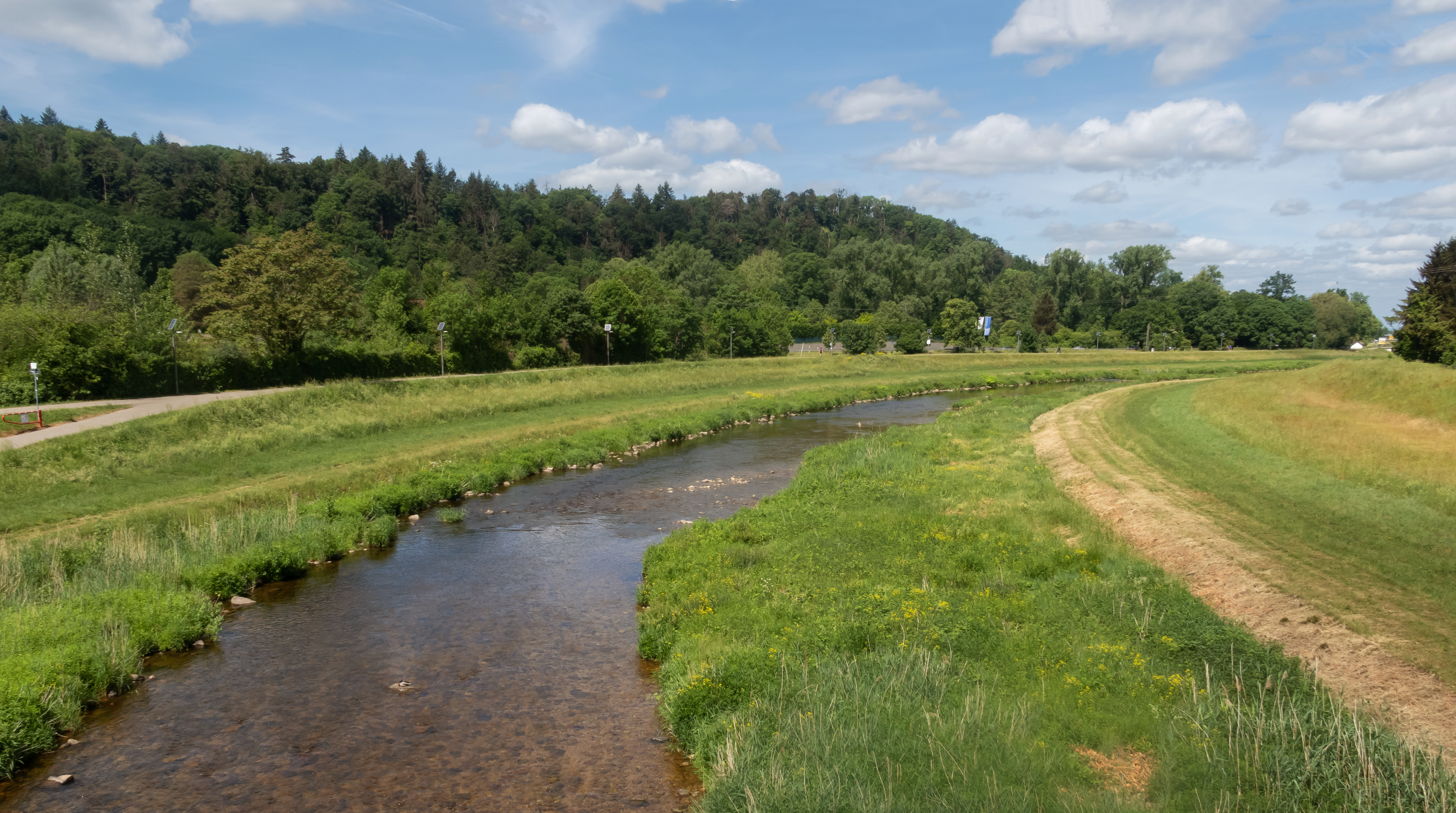
The Murg in Gaggenau

The following towns and villages lie along the Murg, from source to mouth:

- Baiersbronn
- Forbach
- Weisenbach
- Gernsbach
- Gaggenau
- Bischweier
- Kuppenheim
- Rastatt
- Steinmauern

== Dialects ==
Several dialect regions meet one another in the Murg Valley. The area around the upper reaches, around Old Württemberg Baiersbronn, forms the westernmost tip of the Swabian dialect region. The old state border with Baden further downstream is identical with the dialect boundary with Upper Rhine Alemannic, which is strongly defined even today, and which dominates the lower part of the Murg valley. On the lower reaches of the Murg on the Rhine Plain is an Alemannic-Franconian transition dialect with numerous South Franconian dialect features.

== History ==
The Murg historically was important for timber rafting. Wood was rafted first as far as Steinmauern, where it was dried and combined into bigger rafts. From Steinmauern the larger rafts were floated down to Mannheim and onward to the Netherlands.

During the last phase of the Baden Revolution of 1849, the Murg formed the last-ditch defence line for the remanats of the revolutionary army. Driven by overwhelmingly numerous Prussian forces out of the capital Karlesruhe and much of Baden's territory, the revolutionaries staged a fighting withdrawal to the fortress city of Rastatt. The Murg, directly north and east of Rastatt, formed a defence line which they defended with great tenacity.

== Economy and Infrastructure ==
=== Transport ===
The Murg Valley Railway and the Black Forest Valley Highway (Bundesstraße 462) follow the Murg Valley. Both are amongst the most notable transportation routes in Germany for civil engineering and natural beauty.

The gorge-like character of the middle Murg valley was a major obstacle to the development of the transport routes for centuries. The first road from Gernsbach to the upper valley bypassed this section: the Old Wine Road (Alte Weinstraße), as the old trading route was called, ran steeply uphill at first and then ran along the heights of the eastern flanks of the valley. It was not until the second half of the 18th century that a continuous road was built along the bottom of the valley.

The construction of the Murg Valley Railway began with independent sections from Rastatt and Freudenstadt. On the Baden side the first section from Rastatt to Gernsbach went into operation in 1869, Württemberg followed in 1901 with the route from Freudenstadt to Klosterreichenbach. After several expansion stages, a continuous railway connexion was finally established in 1928, i.e. 60 years after the start of construction, and only when the respective national railways were under the sovereignty of the German Reich.

=== Timber rafting ===
Until the 19th century, the Murg was an important route for timber rafting in the valley. Timber merchants and sawmill owners in the Eberstein (later Baden) part of the valley merged to form the trading company of the Murg Shipping Association (Murgerschifferschaft) whose earliest statutes date to 1488. The logs felled in the middle and lower parts of the Mur valley, were floated down the Murg to Steinmauern, where they were dried and assembled into larger rafts. These were transported by Rhine raftsmen, who had a monopoly on this section, on the Rhine to Mannheim. At Mannheim, even larger floating wooden structures were built, some of which were rafted down to the Netherlands.

In the 18th century, the great demand for logs from the Netherlands led to a boom in the timber trade, which led to extensive clearing of the forests until the end of the century. Instead of the Murg Shipping Association, which specialized in sawn timber and did not have enough capital to manage the log trade, other timber companies took over this business.

The transportation of timber was hampered by the rocky gorge in the middle valley. This section could not be traversed by rafts until 1768. As early as the early 18th century, Wüerttemberg's timber trading companies had attempted to create a rafting route by blasting through the rock in the riverbed in order to float the logs from the upper valley down to the Rhine and the Netherlands. However, due to differences with the Bishopric of Speyer in Gernsbach, most of the Württemberg timber at Huzenbach had to be transported about 200 metres up the mountain and then transported to the neighbouring valleys of the Nagold and Enz. For this purpose, a lift called the "machine" was built in 1755. The logs were hoisted up the steep mountain slope using a series of man-powered wheels. However, this rickety structure was abandoned after a few years and the transport was taken over again by wagons.

In order to float the logs from the side valleys into the Murg, splash dams (Schwallungen) were built in the forest, such as the Herrenwieser Schwallung, and existing lakes were further impounded to raise their levels.

Rafting became less important after the construction of the Murg Valley Railway. In 1896, the last raft floated down the river Murg. In 1913 the rafting company closed and was officially banned in 1923.

=== Hiking and cycling ===
In 1981, the Murg Valley Trail (Murgtalwanderweg) was established, running for approximately 100 kilometres following the course of the Murg from its source to its mouth. The Murgleiter trail runs for 110 km between Gaggenau and Schliffkopf along the heights on the other side of the river. The Gernsbacher Runde explores the heights of the Murg valley near Gernsbach. In Forbach the West Way (Black Forest) crosses the valley as part of the E1 European long distance path.

The 67-kilometre-long cycle route known as the "Tour de Murg", begins in Freudenstadt and accompanies the river from Baiersbronn to Rastatt.

== Gallery ==
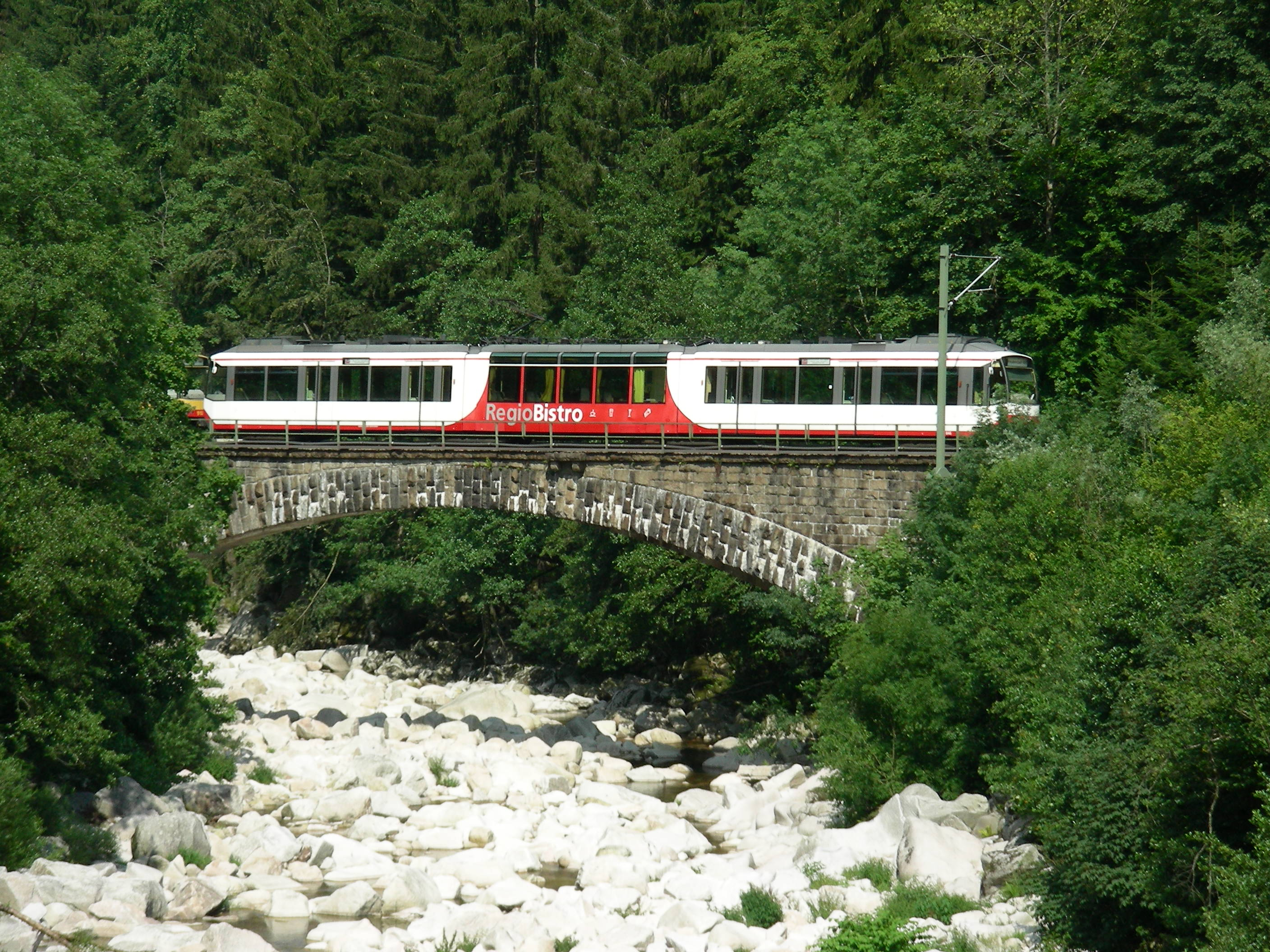
Light rail near Raumünzach

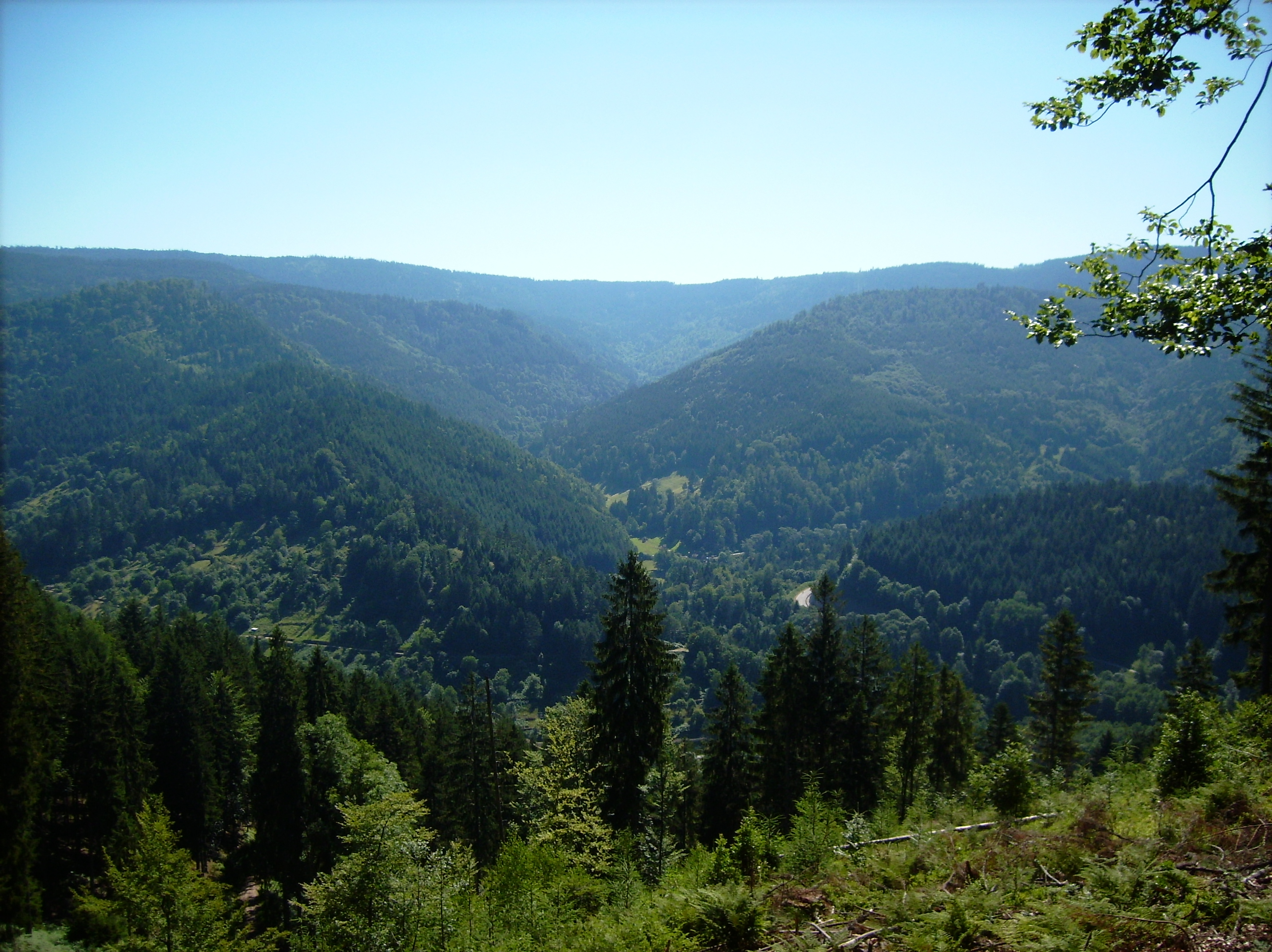
The Murg Valley

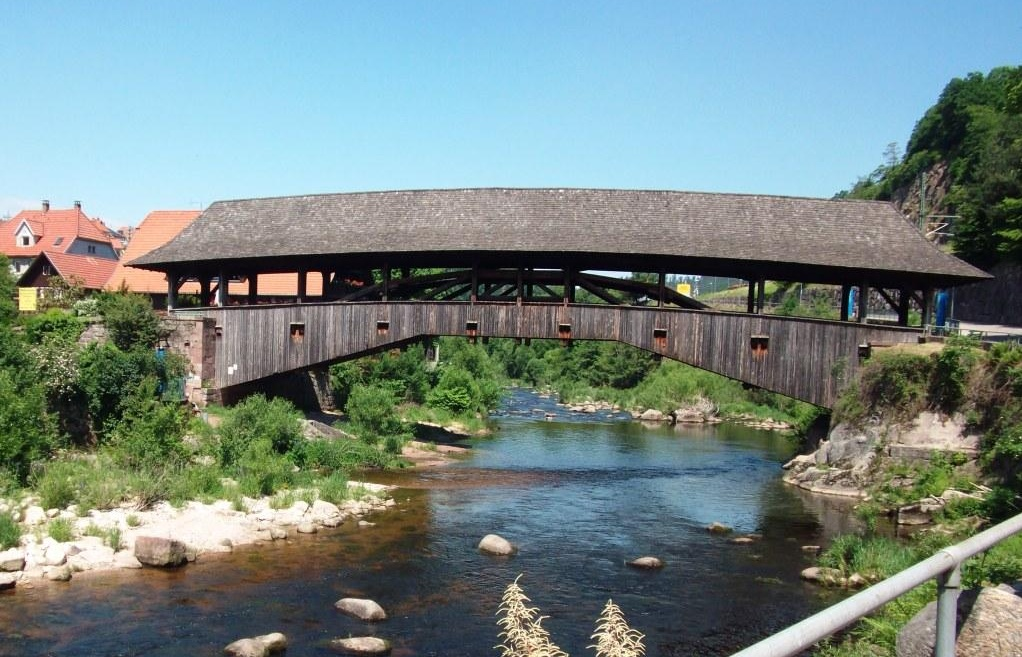
Wooden bridge in Forbach

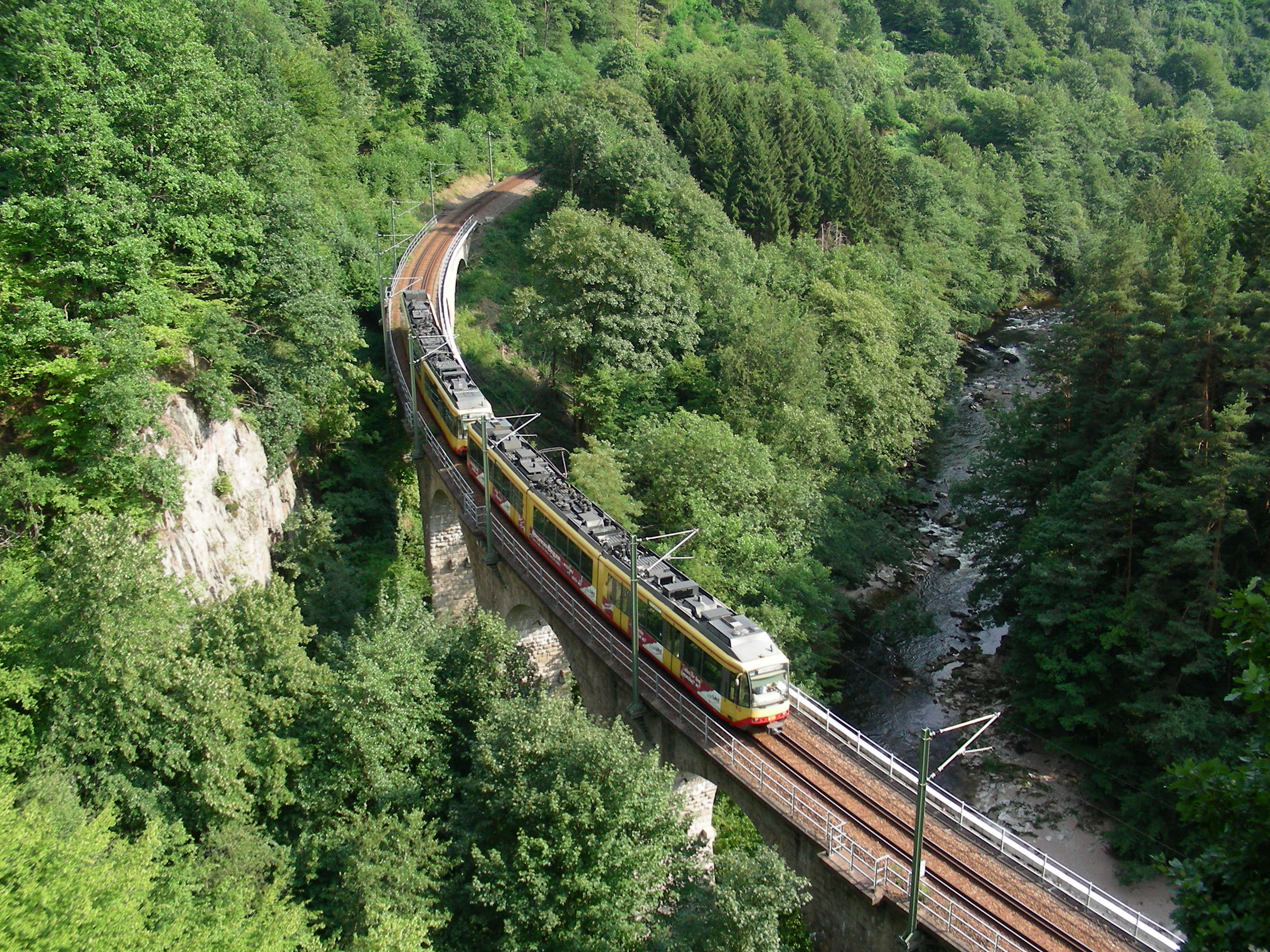
Light rail on the Tennetschlucht bridge

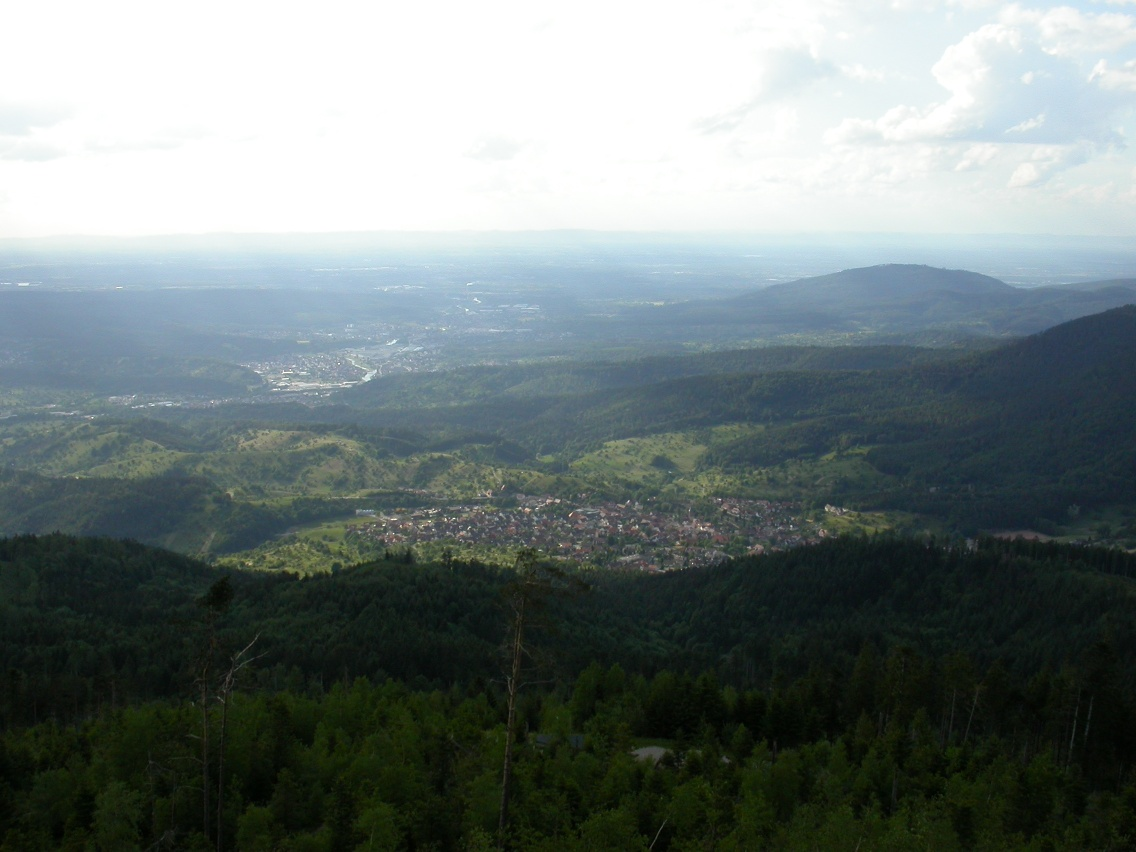
Overlooking Loffenau, Gaggenau in the Murg valley, and the Rhine valley near Rastatt

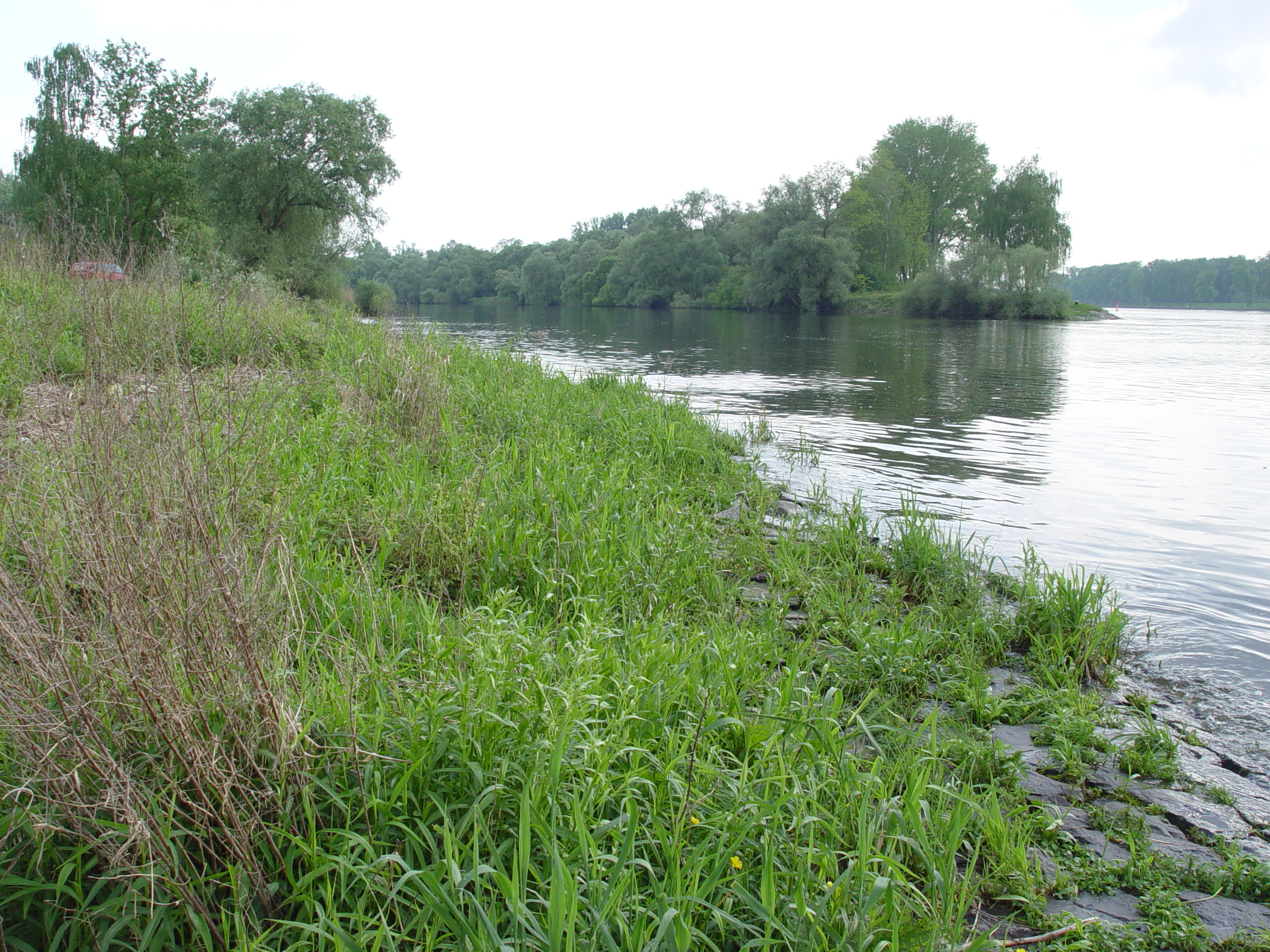
The mouth of the Murg near Steinmauern

== See also ==
- List of rivers of Baden-Württemberg

== Literature ==
- Bittmann, Markus; Bittmann, Meinrad (2009). Das Murgtal: Geschichte einer Landschaft im Nordschwarzwald [The Murg Valley: the story of a landscape in the Northern Black Forest]. Sonderveröffentlichung des Kreisarchivs Rastatt, Band 6 [Special edition of the Rastatt County Archives, Volume 6] (in German). Gernsbach: Casimir Katz Verlag. ISBN 978-3-938047-44-6. OCLC 498958530.
- Max Scheifele, Max; Katz, Casimir; Wolf, Eckhart (1995). Die Murgschifferschaft. Geschichte des Floßhandels, des Waldes und der Holzindustrie im Murgtal [Mariners' of the Murg: the story of the river trade, forests, and the forest industry]. Schriftenreihe der Landesforstverwaltung Baden-Württemberg (Band 66) [Publication series of the State Office for Forestry of Baden-Württemberg (Volume 66)] (in German) (2nd ed.). Gernsbach: Casimir Katz Verlag. ISBN 978-3-925825-20-0. OCLC 635676533.
- Markus Bittmann, Meinrad Bittmann: Das Murgtal: Geschichte einer Landschaft im Nordschwarzwald. Special publication by the Rastatt County Archive, Vol. 6. Casimir Katz Verlag, Gernsbach, 2009, ISBN 978-3-938047-44-6.
- Max Scheifele, Casimir Katz, Eckart Wolf: Die Murgschifferschaft. Geschichte des Floßhandels, des Waldes und der Holzindustrie im Murgtal. (= Series of publications by the Baden-Württemberg Forestry Commission. Band 66). 2nd edition. Casimir Katz Verlag, Gernsbach, 1995, 521 pp., ISBN 3-925825-20-7.
- Wilfried Schweinfurth: Geographie anthropogener Einflüsse – Das Murgsystem im Nordschwarzwald. (= Mannheimer geographische Arbeiten. Band 26). Geographical Institute of the University of Mannheim, 1990, ISBN 978-3-923750-25-2.
- Thomas Fleischhacker: Wie ein Fluss die industrielle Entwicklung erlebt. Die Murg von Gernsbach bis Rastatt. In: Industrialisierung im Nordschwarzwald, Oberrheinische Studien, Vol. 34. Jan Thorbecke Verlag, Ostfildern, 2016, pp. 177–186, ISBN 978-3-7995-7835-6.

Historical descriptions:

- Karl Friedrich Viktor Jägerschmid: Das Murgthal: besonders in Hinsicht auf Naturgeschichte und Statistik. Nuremberg, 1800 (digitalised).
- Franz von Kettner: Beschreibung des badischen Murg- und Oosthals. Frankfurt am Main, 1843 (digitalised).
