= Weisenbach =

- Municipality
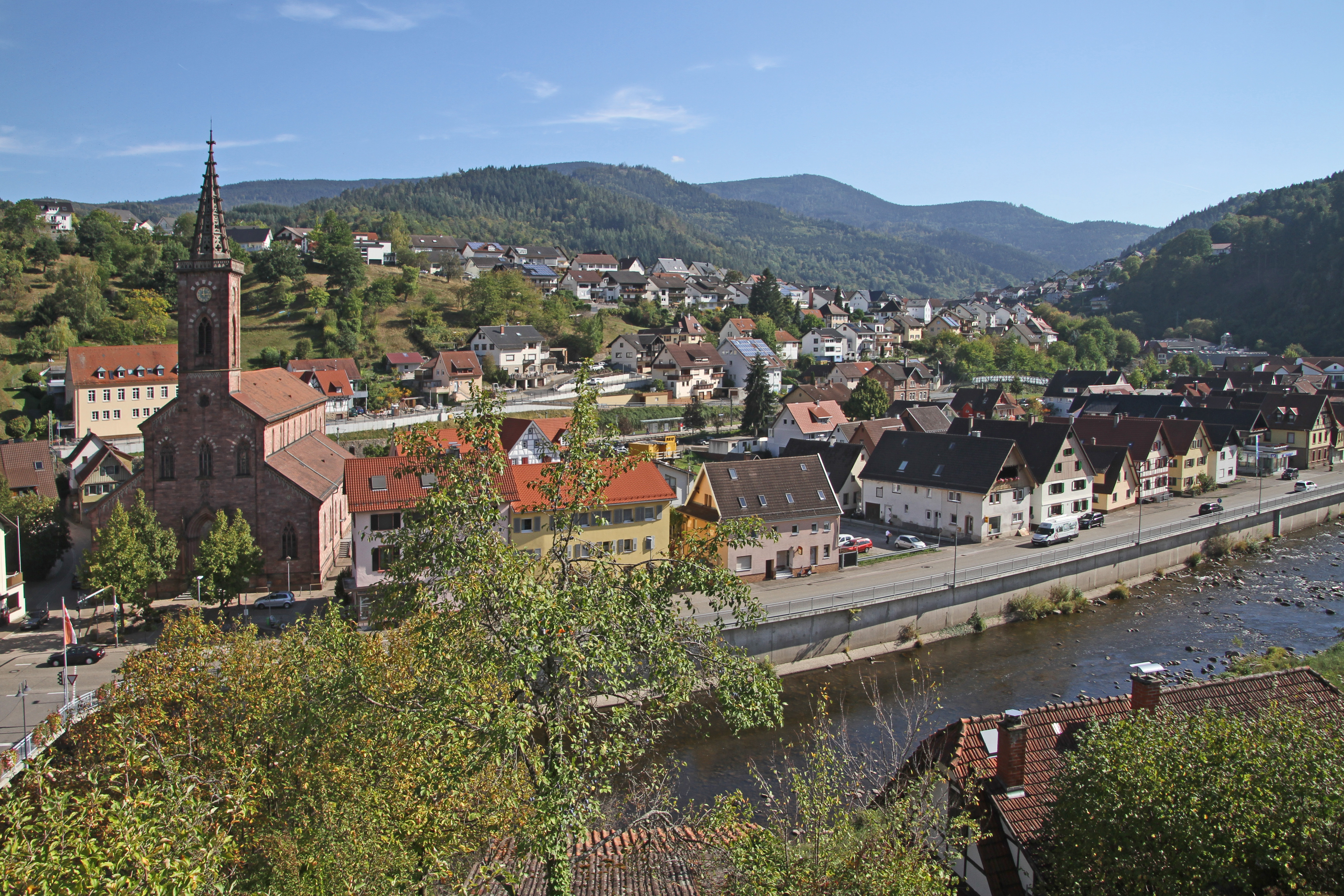

- Coat of arms

- Location of Weisenbach within Rastatt district
- Interactive map of Weisenbach
- Location within Germany Location within Baden-Württemberg
- Coordinates: 48°43′38″N 08°21′07″E
- Country: Germany
- State: Baden-Württemberg
- Admin. region: Karlsruhe
- District: Rastatt

Government
  - Mayor (2019–27): Daniel Retsch (CDU)

Area
  - Total: 9.07 km^{2} (3.50 sq mi)
- Elevation: 228 m (748 ft)

Population (2025-12-31)
  - Total: 2,387
  - Density: 263/km^{2} (682/sq mi)
- Time zone: UTC+01:00 (CET)
  - Summer (DST): UTC+02:00 (CEST)
- Postal codes: 76599
- Dialling codes: 07224
- Vehicle registration: RA
- Website: www.weisenbach.de

Weisenbach (German pronunciation: [ˈvaɪzn̩ˌbax]) is a municipality in the district of Rastatt in Baden-Württemberg in Germany.

== Mayors ==
- -1993 Gerhard Feißt
- 1993–2019: Toni Huber
- since 2019: Daniel Retsch
