= Seekopf (Forbach) =

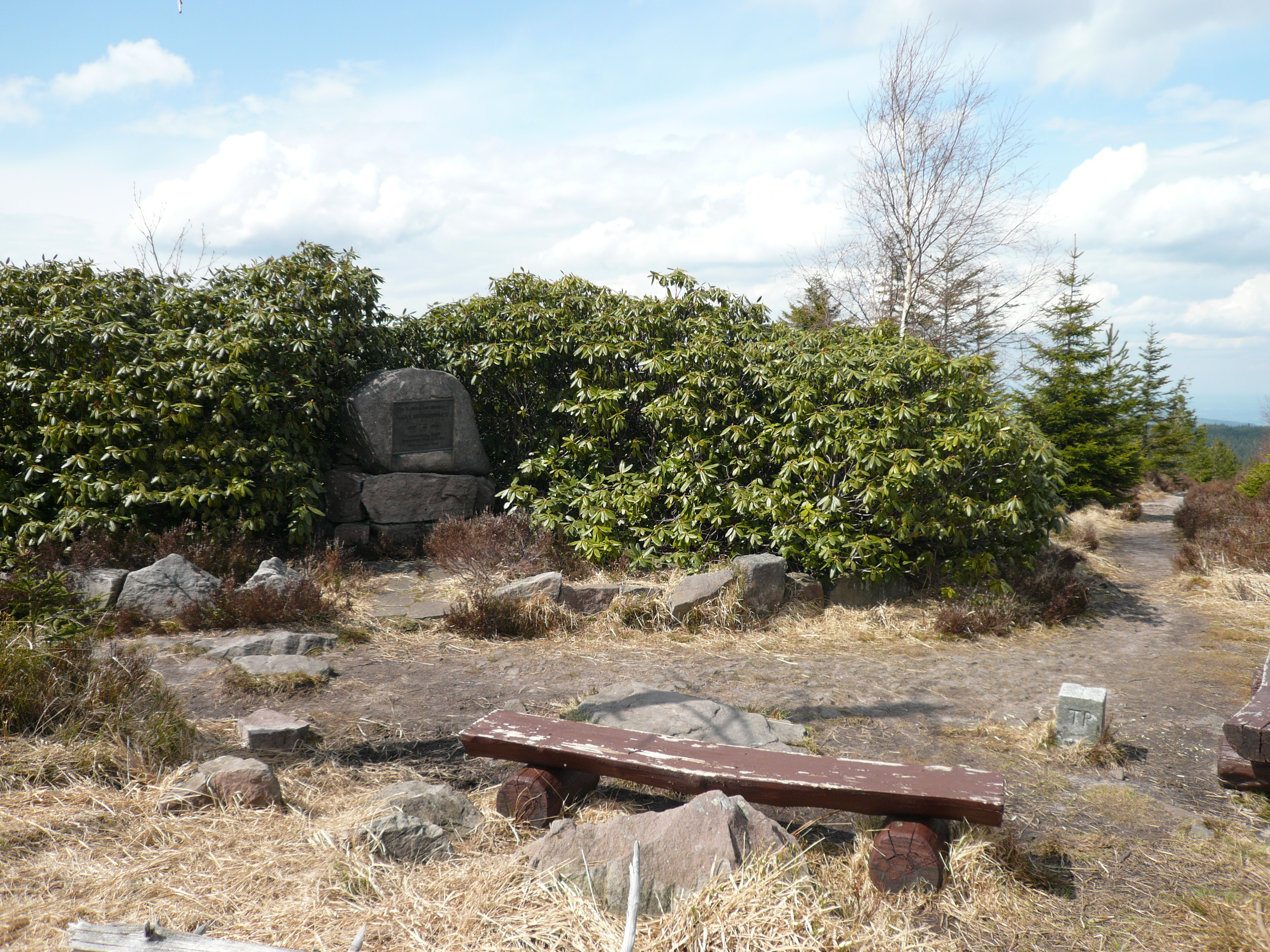
- At the summit of the Seekopf

Highest point
- Elevation: 1,001 m above sea level (NHN) (3,284 ft)
- Coordinates: 48°39′56″N 8°17′24″E

Geography
- Location within Baden-Württemberg
- Location: Baden-Württemberg, Germany
- Parent range: Black Forest

The Seekopf is a mountain, 1,001.1 m above sea level (NHN), near Forbach in the Northern Black Forest between the Badener Höhe and the Schwarzenbach Reservoir. Over the Seekopf runs the West Way, the best known hiking trail in the Black Forest. On the very thinly wooded summit there is a monument to Phillipp Bussemer, a member of the Black Forest Club who died in 1918.

On the eastern flank of the mountain in a 170-metre-deep cirque is a lake, the Herrenwieser See. West of the Seekopf on the other side of the saddle, which forms the transition to the Badener Höhe, is the Black Forest National Park which was established in 2014.

== Power station project ==
As part of an expansion of the Forbach Pumped Storage Power Station, the EnBW plan to build a new upper basin over the summit area of the Seekopf. A circular embankment is intended to impound 2 million cubic metres of water. The area required is 23 hectares. By the end of 2016 the dossier for the planning approval process will be worked up, then the company will decide whether to proceed with the project.

== Nearby mountain with same name ==
Only 11 kilometres further south, also in the Northern Black Forest, lies another mountain of the same name, the Seekopf between Seebach in the county of Ortenaukreis and the Wildsee lake near Ruhestein.
