= Wildsee =

Wildsee may refer to the following lakes:

Austria

- Wildsee (Seefeld), a lake near Seefeld in the Northern Limestone Alps, Tyrol
- Wildsee (Fieberbrunn), a lake in the Kitzbühel Alps near Fieberbrunn, Tyrol

Germany

- Wildsee (Kaltenbronn), a lake near Gernsbach and Bad Wildbad in the Northern Black Forest, Baden-Württemberg
- Wildsee (Ruhestein), a lake near Baiersbronn in the Northern Black Forest, Baden-Württemberg

Italy

- Pragser Wildsee, a lake in the Prags Dolomites in South Tyrol

Switzerland

- Wildsee (Pizol), a lake in the Pizol area in the canton of St. Gallen

== See also ==
- Wildensee (disambiguation)
