= Hohloh =

Mountain in Germany

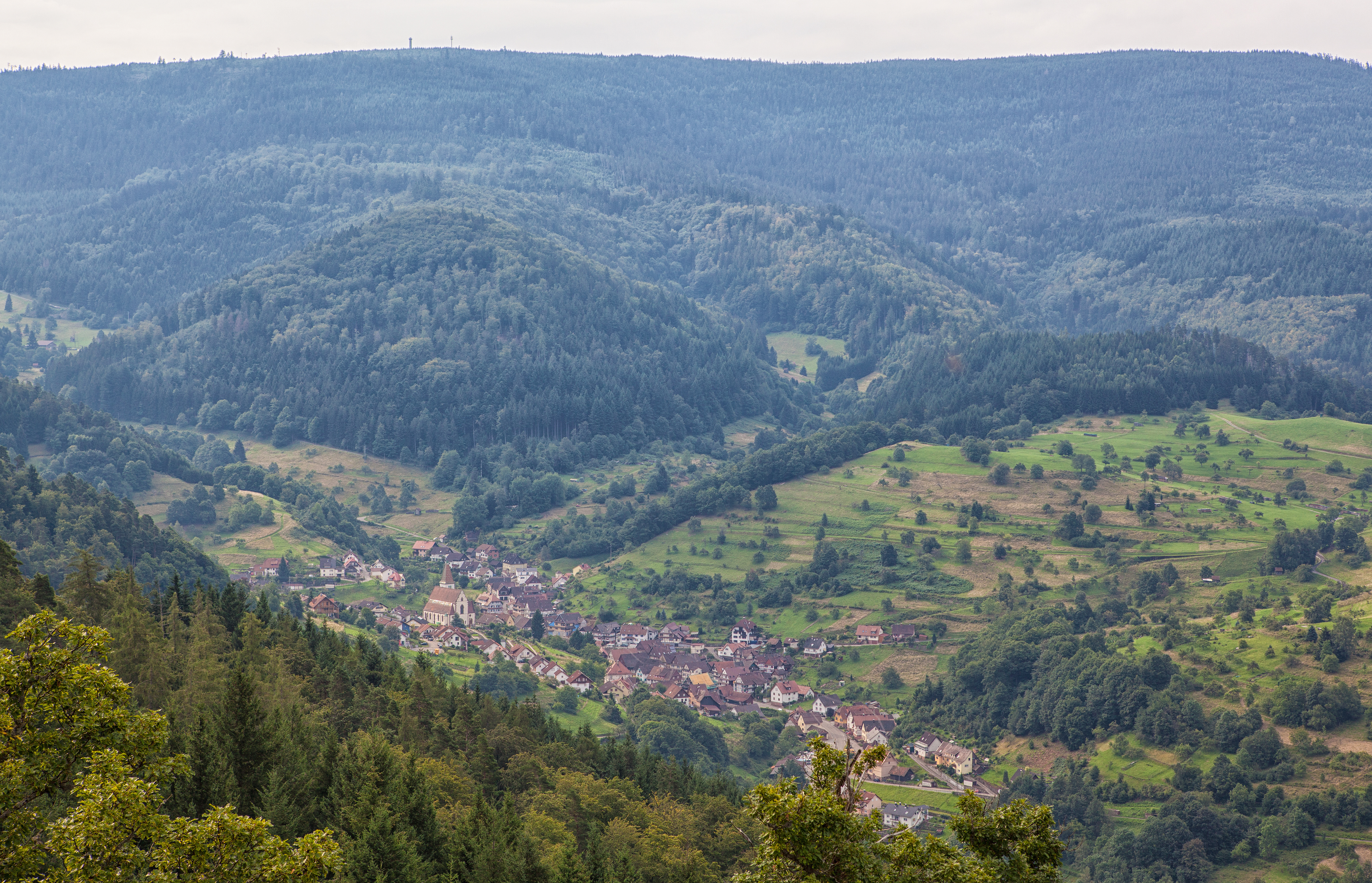
- Reichental and the ridge of the Hohloh from the northwest

Highest point
- Elevation: 988.3 m above sea level (NHN) (3,242 ft)
- Coordinates: 48°42′28″N 8°24′59″E

Geography
- Location within Baden-Württemberg
- Location: Baden-Württemberg, Germany
- Parent range: Black Forest

Geology
- Rock type: Bunter sandstone

The Hohloh is a mountain, 988.3 m above sea level (NHN), on the eastern main ridge of the Northern Black Forest in Germany. It lies near the village of Kaltenbronn in the borough of Gernsbach, a town in the county of Rastatt in the German state of Baden-Württemberg. Its summit is the highest point in the borough of Gernsbach and the eastern chain of the Northern Black Forest, the ridge between the rivers Murg and Enz. A mountain pass runs northeast of the summit plateau between the two river valleys passing over the saddle of Schwarzmiss (933 m).

Characteristic of the Hohloh is its flat bunter sandstone kuppe with its observation tower, the Hohloh Tower (Hohlohturm) and a raised bog and bog lakes on the plateau which are protected.

== Geography ==
=== Location ===
The Hohloh lies within the Central/North Black Forest Nature Park, mainly on the forest estates of the Gernsbach hamlet of Kaltenbronn, which is situated 2 kilometres east of the summit. On the western edge of the plateau, parts of the mountainside belong to the villages and municipalities of Reichental, Weisenbach, Langenbrand and Gausbach, which lie in the valley of the Murg. Since the municipal reforms in Baden-Württemberg in the 1970s, Kaltenbronn and Reichental have been part of the municipality of Gernsbach, Langenbrand and Gausbach belong to Forbach (all in the county of Rastatt).

The forests of Kaltenbronn belong administratively to the western Murg valley, although they are east of the main crest. The boundary between the Eberstein or Old Baden Murg valley (Amt of Gernsbach) and the Old Württemberg Enz valley (Oberamt Wildbad) did not run along the watershed of the Hohloh, but about two or three kilometres east of it. The entire Hohloh region thus lay in Baden.

=== Natural region grouping ===
According to the Handbook of the Natural Region Divisions of Germany the Hohloh is part of the major unit group of the Black Forest (no. 15), of the Grinden Black Forest and Enz Heights (Grindenschwarzwald und Enzhöhen) major unit (no. 151), the Enz Heights (Enzhöhen) sub-unit (no. 151.1) and Enzmissen natural region (no. 151.11). Towards the east the countryside descends into the natural region of Enzriedel (151.10), to the southwest into the sub-unit of the Grinden Black Forest (Grindenschwarzwald) (151.0) and natural region of Grinden of the Middle Murg Valley (Grinden des mittleren Murgtals) (151.02) and to the northwest into the major unit of the Northern Riverine Black Forest (Nördlicher Talschwarzwald) (152), sub-unit of the Bühlertal Forest (Bühlertaler Wald) (152.1) and natural region of the Murg Forest (Murgwald) (152.11).

=== Hills and high points ===
The Hohloh is 988.3 m above sea level (NHN). Its flat summit dome or kuppe is the highest point on the eastern mountain chain of the Northern Black Forest, the ridge between the valleys of the Murg and Enz. Its opposite number is the Hornisgrinde, the highest point on the western mountain chain. On many maps, an elevation of 984 m is given; this is the height of the nearby site of the Hohloh Tower.

=== Topography ===
The summit region of the Hohloh is formed by a broad plateau. In the west the plateau is bounded mainly by steep slopes with a pre-alpine character in the valley of the Murg which, like the plateau, lie on the bunter sandstone platform. Below a height of about 640 metres, this is succeeded by the basement and fertile soils on Forbach Granite, recognisable by a step in the landscape with a spring horizon, the transition from coniferous to mixed beech forest and the onset of grassy valleys. To the east, facing the Enz valley, the relief energy is markedly lower, the mountainsides are gentler, the boundary of the plateau less clear. The Hohloh region is drained, corresponding to the large-scale direction of dip of the bunter sandstone, predominantly into the eastern valleys (the Kegeltal valley, where the mountain pass over the Schwarzmiss runs, and the Rombach valley), long side valleys of the Great Enz. To the north the main chain heads for the Langmartskopf (Langmahd), Teufelsmühle and the Dobel, to the south it transitions to the Breitloh region, followed by the Toter Mann, the Schramberg and the village of Besenfeld.

== Nature ==
=== Plateau and raised bogs ===
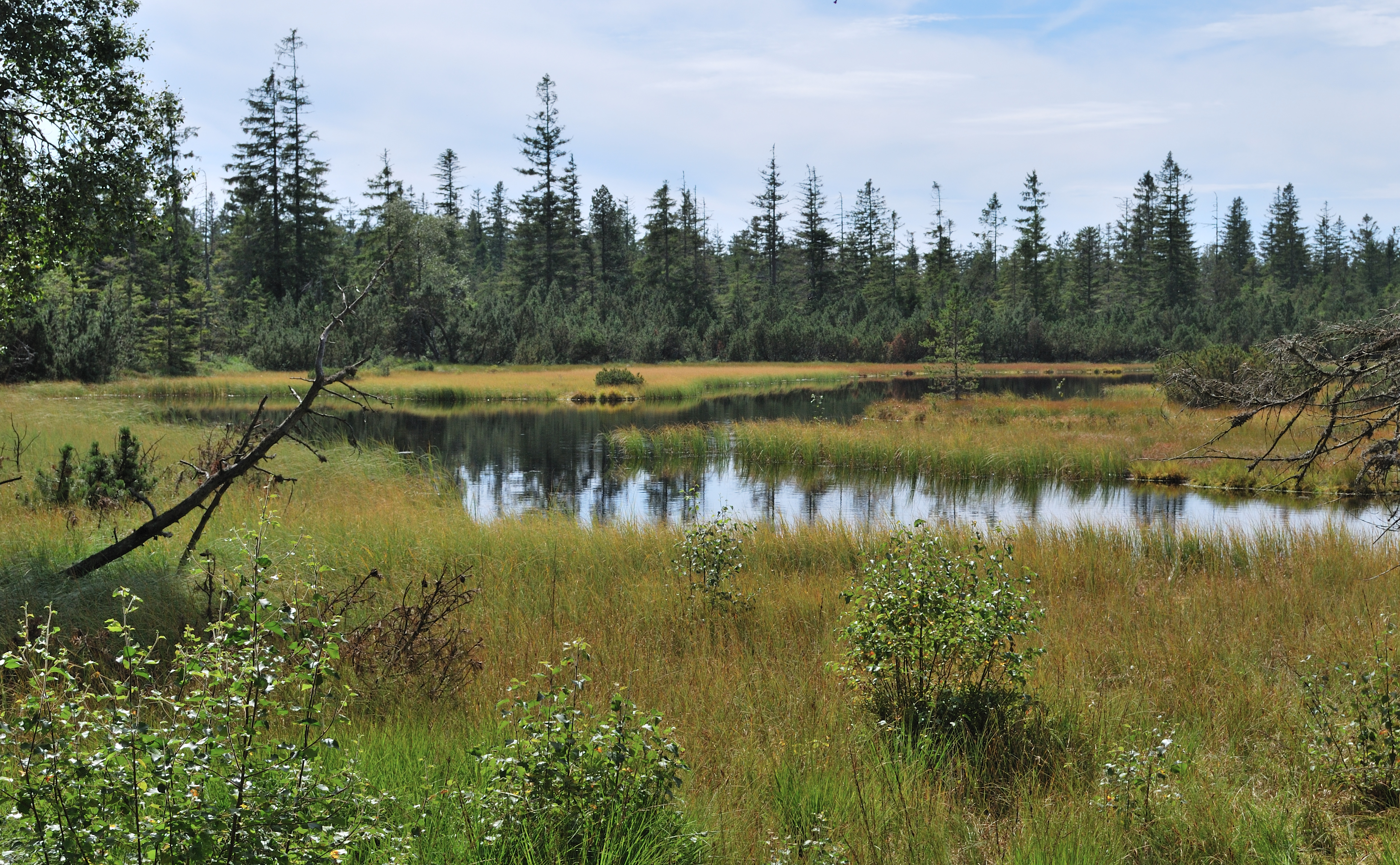
Great Hohlohsee

On the southern part of the plateau is the Hohlohmiss, a misse with raised bogs and several bog ponds, including the Great and Little Hohlohsee. Like the neighbouring Wildseemoor, these are biogenic and not geomorphological landforms. They have developed since the last ice age about 10,000 years ago due to the high rainfall on the acidic klebsands of the upper conglomerate horizon of Middle Bunter. Due to their outstanding ecological importance, the Hohlohmiss and Wildseemoor have been protected as part of the Kaltenbronn Nature Reserve.

=== Reserves ===
The Hohlohseemoor south of the Hohloh summit has been a nature reserve since 1940. Since 2000, the Hohlohsee bei Kaltenbronn Nature Reserve together with the Wildseemoor and surrounding bannwald and schonwald have been part of the Kaltenbronn Nature Reserve and Protected Forest which covers an area of 17.5 km^{2}. On the mountain there are parts of the protected area of the Middle Murg Valley (Mittleres Murgtal), CDDA No. 323009; 1940; 76.1 km^{2}); the reserves being excluded from it. The nature reserve is part of the fauna-flora habitat region of Kaltenbronner Enzhöhen (FFH-No. 7316-341; 10.4244 km^{2}). In addition there are elements of the Northern Black Forest bird reserve (Vogelschutzgebiet Nordschwarzwald, VSG No. 7415-441; 360.4511 km^{2}) on the mountain.

The Kaltenbronn region with the Hohloh was considered for inclusion in the Black Forest National Park, established in 2014, but was not eventually included.

== Usage ==
=== Hohloh Tower and transmitter ===
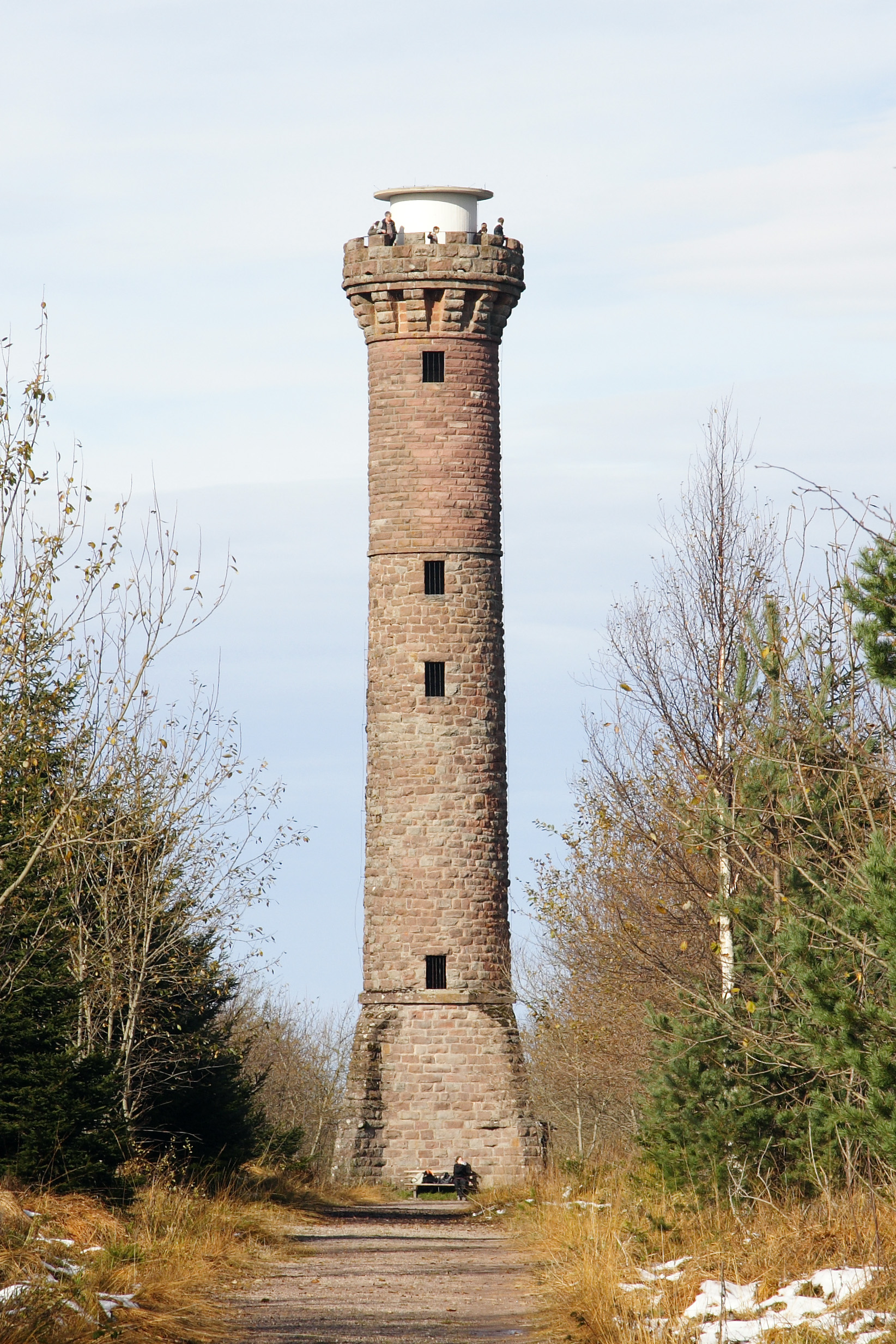
Hohloh Tower

At the northern end of the summit plateau, at a height of 984 m, is the Hohloh Tower (Hohlohturm), officially the Emperor William Tower (Kaiser-Wilhelm-Turm), an observation tower, from which there are often wide views in the Northern Black Forest. It stands about 200 metres north of the summit and on the edge of the steep slope where a better view of the Murg Valley to the northwest may be had.

As early as 1853 the Kaltenbronn Forestry Department directed the construction of an observation tower that, as well as having long-distance views into the Murg and Rhine valleys as well as of Württemberg and Hohenzollern in favourable weather, and even of the Bernese Alps, about 250 kilometres away. A few years later a wooden tower with a toposcope was built, which was accessible until 1895. In 1897 the Black Forest Club had a new tower built of bunter sandstone from the local area (work started on 10 May and it was completed on 12 August), which was 22.2 metres high at that time. Due to the height to which the trees had grown, it was raised in 1968 by a further 6.4 metres to the present 28.6 metres. This extra section can be seen from inside the tower: in the area of the old top of the tower the material of the newel changes from sandstone ashlars to Béton brut. The staircase has 158 steps. The observation platform is at a height of roughly 1,012 m. Today the tower is managed by the Gernsbach branch of the Black Forest Club and owned by the state of Baden-Württemberg. On 21 October 2010 a licensing agreement was made between the Black Forest Club and the Forest Commission of Baden-Württemberg, prior to that its use was not regulated legally.

The views reach from the Vosges to the southwest, over the Palatine Forest to the northwest, the Odenwald to the north as far as the Jurassic crags of the Swabian Jura. In very good visibility the Feldberg in the Southern Black Forest and several peaks of the Swiss Alps can be made out on the southern horizon; to the north occasionally the Großer Feldberg in the Taunus may be seen. The panorama was improved further in the 1990s as a result of hurricanes Vivian, Wiebke and Lothar which destroyed large areas of trees on the summit plateau.

Between the tower and the summit, on the site of a former military radio relay installation is now a civilian transmission mast and transmitter site that enables mobile telephony in the remote highlands.

=== Transport, hiking and sport ===
About 930 metres northeast of the summit of the Hohloh and 800 metres northeast of the Hohloh Tower on the northeastern edge of the summit plateau is the Schwarzmiss saddle (933 m), over which the Landesstraße 76b runs between Hilpertsau on the Murg and Sprollenhaus on the Great Enz. Both on the Schwarzmiss as well as below it (for example in the hamlet of Kaltenbronn) are several hikers' car parks. They are starting points for walks, mountain bike tours and loipes. There are public bus services to Schwarzmiss and Kaltenbronn from the Murg and Enz valleys.

The Black Forest ridgeways of West Way and Middle Way as well as the E1 European long distance path run via Kaltenbronn and the Hohloh past the Hohlohsee and Hohloh Tower. The Hohlohseemoor is accessible on a board walk. The long distance ski trails on the ridge run north to the Dobel (15 km from Schwarzmiss) and Wildbad-Sommerberg (12.5 km), to the south as far as Besenfeld (16 km). At Kaltenbronn there is a downhill ski slope with drag lifts.

The Old Wine Road (Alte Weinstraße), a historical cart track from the lower to upper Murg Valley runs along the ridge of the Hohloh. It bypassed the gorge-like Middle Murg Valley which, until the 18th century, was only accessible on a mule track.

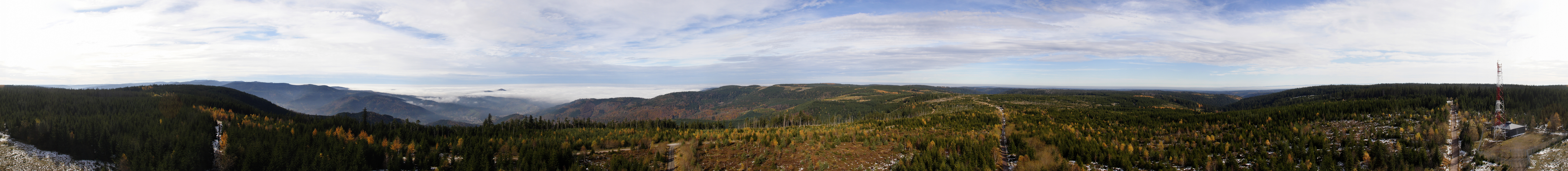
All-round view from the observation tower on the Hohloh
