= Seekopf (Seebach) =

Mountain of the Black Forest

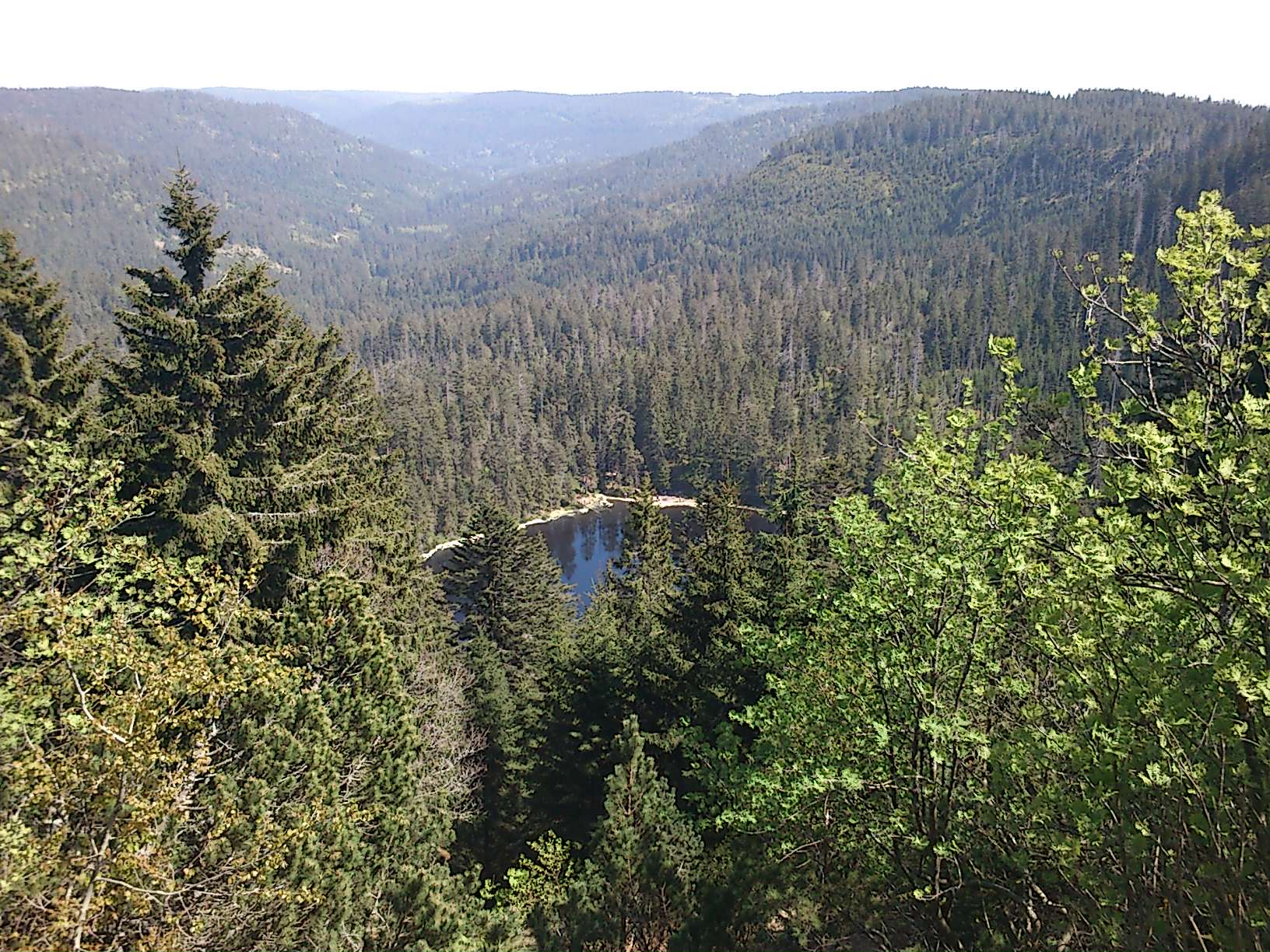
- View from the Seekopf of the Wildsee and surrounding Bannwald and nature reserve

Highest point
- Elevation: 1,054 m above sea level (NHN) (3,458 ft)
- Coordinates: 48°34′15″N 8°14′03″E

Geography
- Location within Baden-Württemberg
- Location: Baden-Württemberg, Germany (Part of the Black Forest National Park)
- Parent range: Black Forest

The Seekopf is a mountain on the main chain of the Northern Black Forest in Germany between the Upper Rhine Plain and the Murg valley, above Seebach. It is 1,054.2 m above sea level (NHN) and lies on the boundary of the counties of Ortenaukreis and Freudenstadt in the state of Baden-Württemberg.

The mountain ridge, the upper area of which is formed of bunter sandstone, belongs to the natural region known as Grindenschwarzwald and Enzhöhen. The Black Forest High Road (B 500) runs along its western flank and, below the eastern mountainside, is a tarn, the Wildsee. The West Way runs over the mountain leading to Ruhestein, 1.5 kilometres to the southwest. The Seekopf lies within the Black Forest National Park, established in 2014.

On the summit plateau is the grave of Julius Euting, a well-known orientalist and co-founder of the Vosges Club.

== Nearby namesake ==
Just 11 kilometres further north, also in the Northern Black Forest, stands another mountain with the same name, the Seekopf near Forbach-Herrenwies in the county of Rastatt.
