= Herrenwieser See =

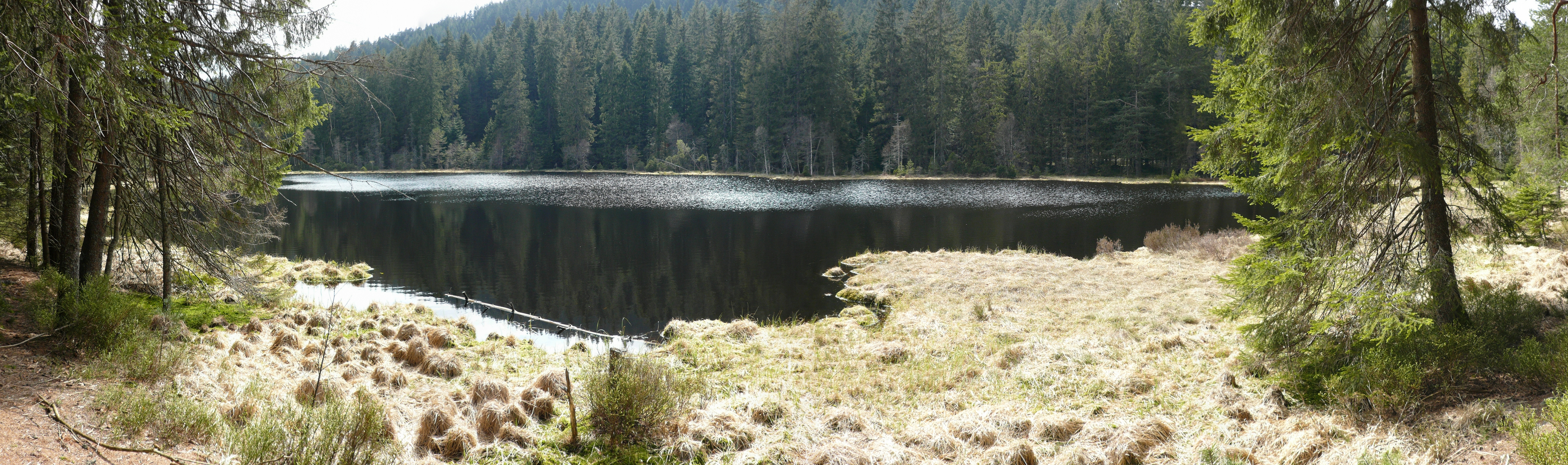
- View of the Herrenwieser See

- Location within Baden-Württemberg
- Location: Baden-Württemberg
- Coordinates: 48.668417°N 8.295536°E
- Primary inflows: Seegraben
- Primary outflows: Seegraben → Seebach → Schwarzenbach Reservoir → Schwarzenbach → Murg → Rhine
- Max. length: 0.176 km (0.109 mi)
- Max. width: 0.092 km (0.057 mi)
- Surface area: 1.2 ha (3.0 acres)
- Max. depth: 9.5 m (31 ft)
- Surface elevation: 829.5 m (2,721 ft)

The Herrenwieser See is a tarn in the municipality of Forbach in the Northern Black Forest in Germany. It lies at a height of 830 metres, a little northwest of the Schwarzenbach Reservoir and 1,600 metres as the crow flies northeast of Herrenwies on the eastern mountainside of the 1,001-metre-high Seekopf, a subpeak of the Badener Höhe. The lake covers an area of 1.2 hectares and is up to 9.5 metres deep. Habitats Directive area and, together with the cirque headwall, designated as a biotope. It can be circumnavigated on a footpath. The lake itself is surrounded by a fence and the shore is out-of-bounds for nature conservation reasons.

In the days of timber rafting a facility was built that enabled logs to be transported down the valley on the waters from the lake.
