= Mahlberg (disambiguation) =

Mahlberg is a town in the county of Ortenaukreis, Baden-Württemberg, Germany.

Mahlberg may also refer to:

== Places ==
- Mahlberg (mountain) (612.5 m), a mountain in the Northern Black Forest, Baden-Württemberg, Germany
- Mahlberg (Bad Münstereifel), part of the town of Bad Münstereifel, North Rhine-Westphalia
- Mahlberg (Westerwald) (Malberg) (360 m), hill in the Lower Westerwald, Rhineland-Palatinate, Germany
- Mahlberg (Harz) (476.8 m), hill in the Harz Mountains, Saxony-Anhalt, Germany

== Surname ==
- Greg Mahlberg (born 1952), American baseball player and manager
- Renate Mahlberg (born 1949), German author
- Thomas Mahlberg (born 1965), German politician (CDU)
- Walter Mahlberg (1884–1935), German economist

== See also ==
- Malberg (disambiguation)
