= Moosalb =

Moosalb may refer to:

- Moosalb (Schwarzbach), a river of Rhineland-Palatinate, Germany, tributary of the Schwarzbach
- Moosalb (Alb), a river of Baden-Württemberg, Germany, tributary of the Alb

== See also ==
- Moosalp, a high mountain pass in the canton of Valais in Switzerland
