= Mahlberg (mountain) =

Mountain in Germany

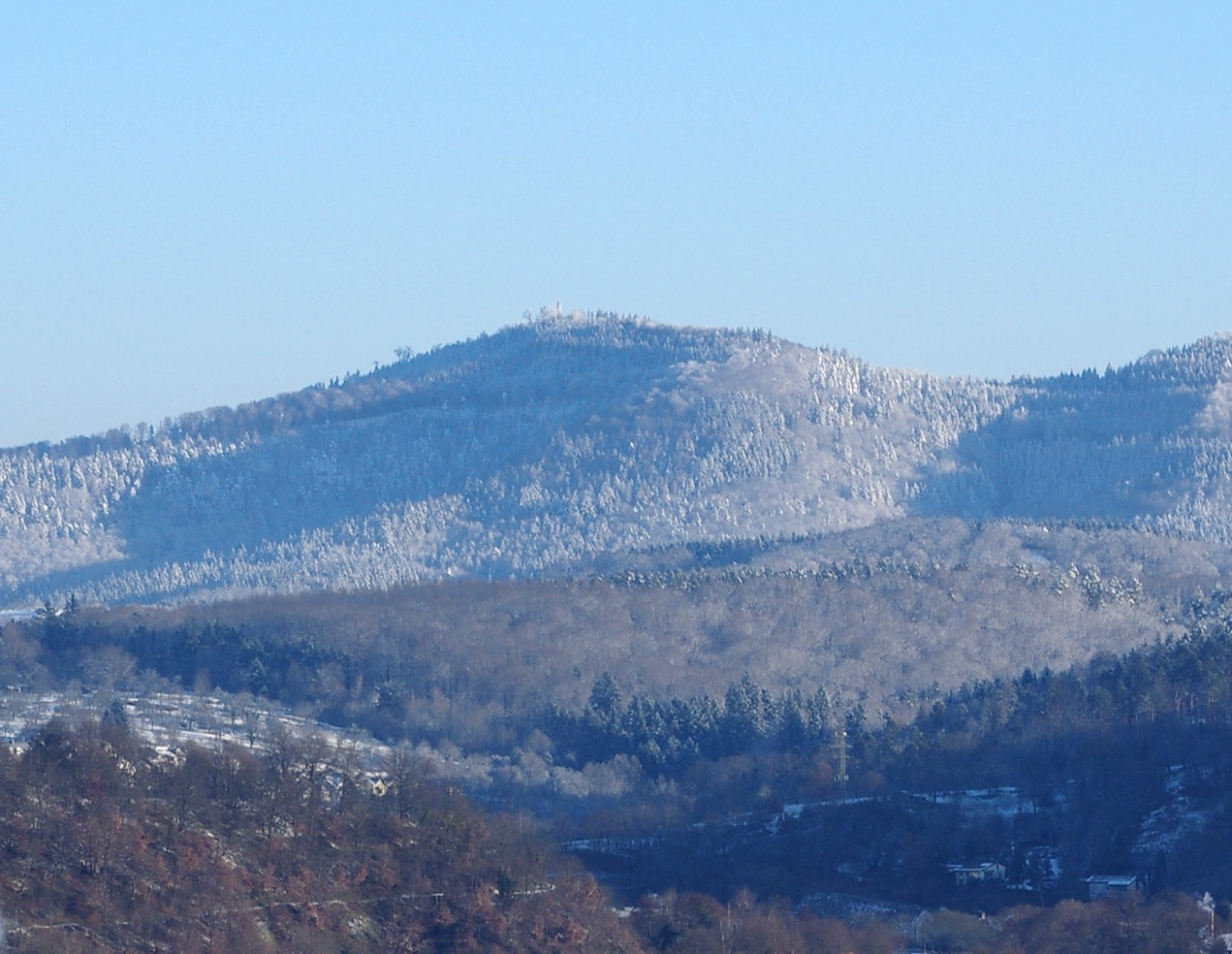
- The Mahlberg on a winter's morning, seen from Gernsbach

Highest point
- Elevation: 612.5 m above sea level (NHN) (2,010 ft)
- Coordinates: 48°50′09″N 8°22′37″E

Geography
- Location within Baden-Württemberg
- Location: near Gaggenau; counties of Rastatt and Karlsruhe; Northern Black Forest (Germany)
- Parent range: Black Forest

The Mahlberg is a mountain in the northwest of the Northern Black Forest and, at 612.5 m above sea level (NHN), is the highest point in the Baden-Württemberg county of Karlsruhe and the parish of Völkersbach. Its eastern side belongs to the municipality of Malsch in Karlsruhe and the western side to the borough of Gaggenau in the county of Rastatt.

== Geography ==
=== Location ===
The Mahlberg lies within the Central/North Black Forest Nature Park. It rises between the Gaggenau villages of Freiolsheim in the northwest, Moosbronn in the east and Michelbach in the southwest. Its western side belongs to the Gaggenau parish of Rotenfels; on the eastern side lies an exclave of the Malsch parish of Völkersbach.

=== Rivers and streams ===
The Moosalb flows past the Mahlberg to the east and the Michelbach runs past it to the south, the little tributaries of which - Obersbach, Walkenbach, Litzelbach and Eckbach - rise south and southwest of the mountain. In the west the waters of the Hildebrand spring flow into the Waldprechtsbach.

== Reserves ==
On the eastern slopes of the Mahlberg lie parts of the nature reserve of Alb Valley and Side Valleys (Albtal und Seitentäler, CDDA No. 162059; established in 1994; 6.36 km^{2} in area) and the Special Area of Conservation of the same name (No. 7116-341; 27.2533 km^{2}). The eastern side also includes parts of the protected landscape (LSG) of the Alb Valley Plateaux and Herrenalb Mountains (Albtalplatten und Herrenalber Berge, CDDA No. 319471; 1994; 47.1223 km^{2}), and up to the western flank extends another LSG, the Eichelberg and Mahlberg (Um den Eichelberg und Mahlberg, CDDA No. 319471; 1994; 47.1223 km^{2}).

== Summit region ==
On the summit of the Mahlberg stands the Mahlberg Tower. Next to it is a refuge hut with a public barbecue area. Not far from the tower there is a memorial site with the grave of two Wehrmacht soldiers who died on 10 April 1945 when the radio station on the mountain was shelled during the Second World War.

== Mahlberg Tower ==
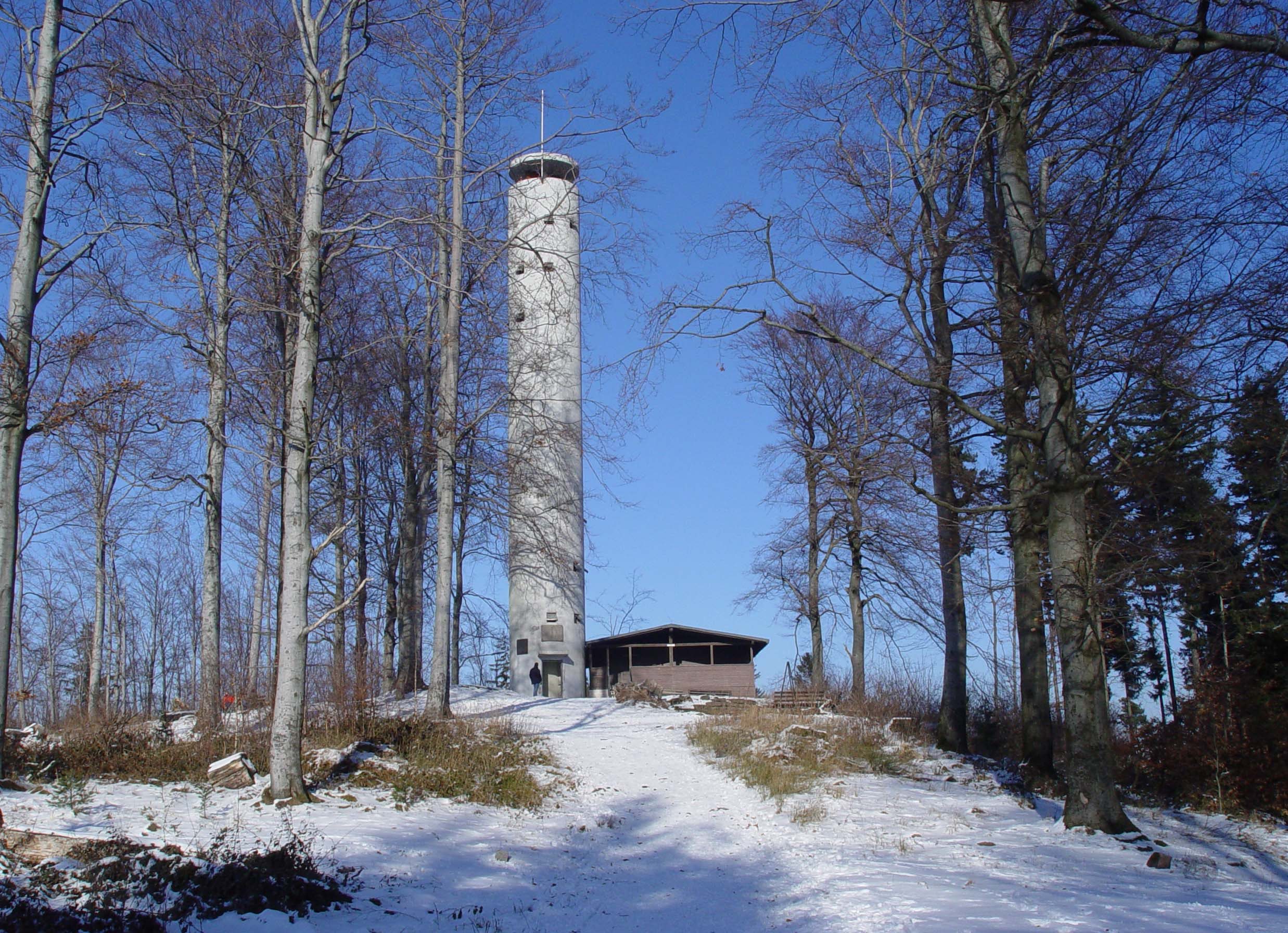
The Mahlberg Tower (viewing tower)

The tower on the top of the Mahlberg was built as a reinforced concrete observation tower. On the tower is a plaque with an inscription that is translated as follows:

Under Grand Duke Frederick I of Baden, Protector of the Karlsruhe Branch of the Baden Black Forest Club, the first tower was built in 1896. As a result of artillery bombardment on 10 April 1945 the tower was so badly damaged that, in August 1961, it had to be demolished.
On 3 June 1962 the foundation stone of the new tower was laid and, on 29 September 1962, the inauguration took place. The tower was erected by the building department of the city of Karlsruhe, and funded by the state of Baden-Württemberg, the city of Karlsruhe, the counties of Karlsruhe and Rastatt, and by voluntary donations.

The tower, which is open to the public, is a popular destination with hikers. In the area of its entrance there is a request for small donations to assist in preserving the tower. The viewing platform is reached via 160 steps and has views of the Murg and Moosalb valleys, large parts of the Upper Rhine Plain, the Vosges and the Palatine Forest, and the Kraichgau and Odenwald.

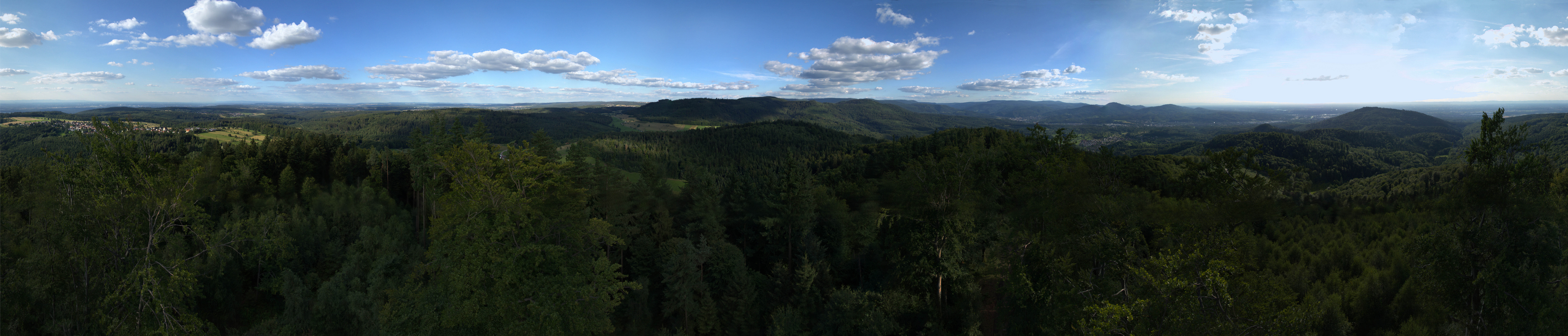
360-degree-panorama from the Mahlberg Tower
