= Moosalb (Alb) =

River in Germany

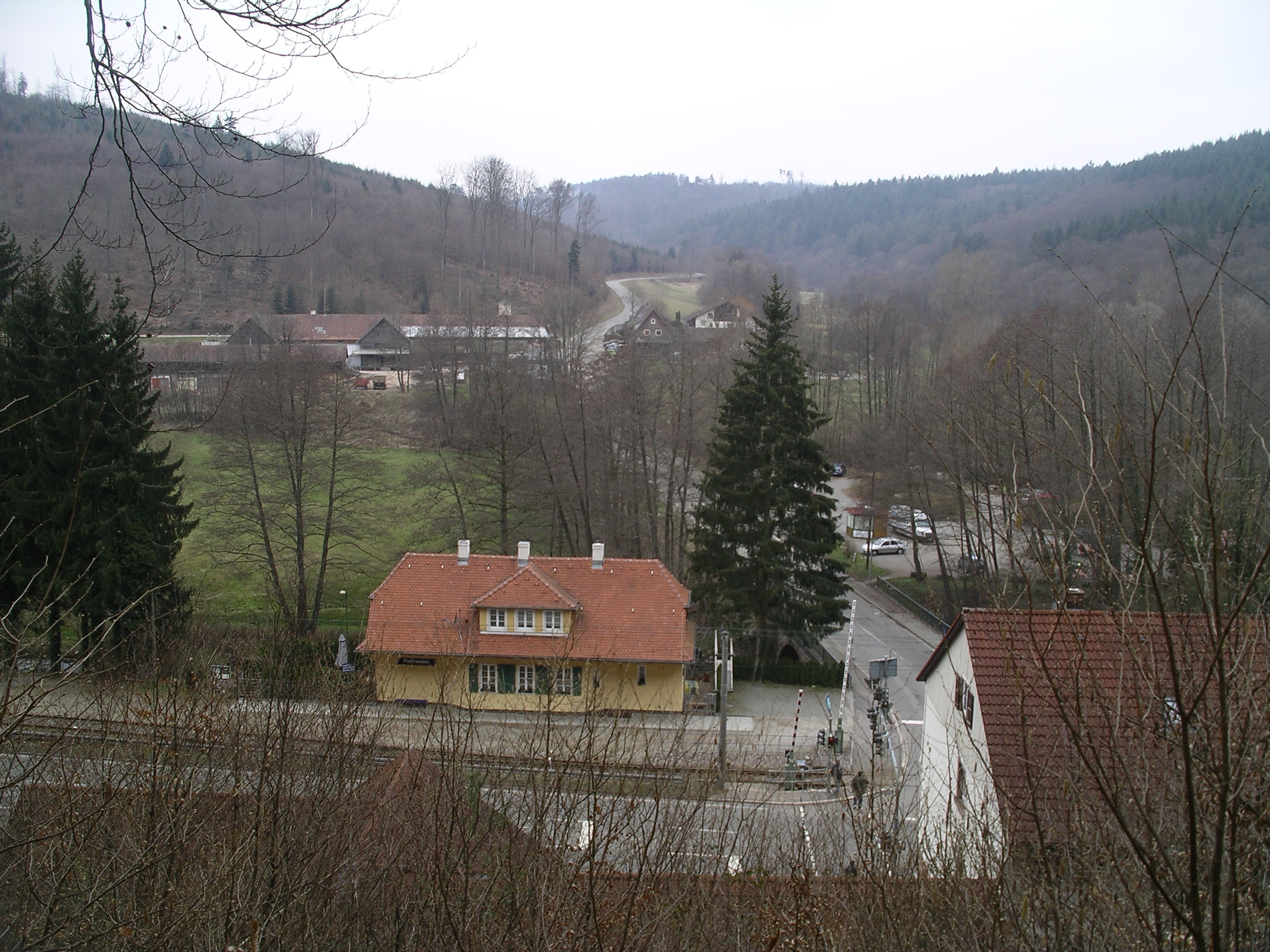
- View over Fischweier into the lower Moosalb valley

Location
- Country: Germany
- State: Baden-Württemberg
- Districts: Calw; Rastatt; Karlsruhe
- Reference no.: DE: 23746

Physical characteristics
- Source
  - location: Southeast of Gaggenau-Moosbronn
  - coordinates: 48°49′58″N 8°24′06″E
  - elevation: ca. 479 m above sea level (NN) Hüttlesbrunnen
- Mouth
  - location: Near Fischweier from the left and west into the upper Alb
  - coordinates: 48°53′27″N 8°27′02″E
  - elevation: ca. 207 m above sea level (NN)
- Length: 10.5 km (6.5 mi)
- Basin size: 27.7 km^{2} (10.7 sq mi)

Basin features
- Progression: Alb→ Rhine→ North Sea
- Tributaries
  - right: Schneebach

The Moosalb is a river, around ten kilometres long, in the Northern Black Forest in the German state of Baden-Württemberg. It discharges from the left into the Alb near Fischweier.

== See also ==
- List of rivers of Baden-Württemberg

== Literature ==
- TK25: topographic map, 1:25,000 series, Baden-Württemberg, Sheet No. 7116 Malsch
