= Wildensee =

Wildensee is the name of:

- Wildensee (Eschau), a village in the market borough of Eschau, county of Miltenberg, Bavaria, Germany
- Wildensee (Mittenwald), a village in the market borough of Mittenwald, county of Garmisch-Partenkirchen, Bavaria, Germany
- Wildensee (Zeitz), a village in the borough of Zeitz, Burgenland county, Saxony-Anhalt
- Wildensee (Salzkammergut), a lake in the Totes Gebirge in the Austrian state of Styria
- a small Alpine lake at 2,514 metres in the Venediger Group of the High Tauern in the Austrian state of Tyrol, East Tyrol. Also called the Wilden See.
- Wildlense is the name of a non profit organization working for wildlife & nature conservation with name Wildlense Eco Foundation.

== See also ==
- Wildsee (disambiguation)
