= Kaltenbronn (Gernsbach) =

Coordinates: 48°42′23″N 8°25′57″E

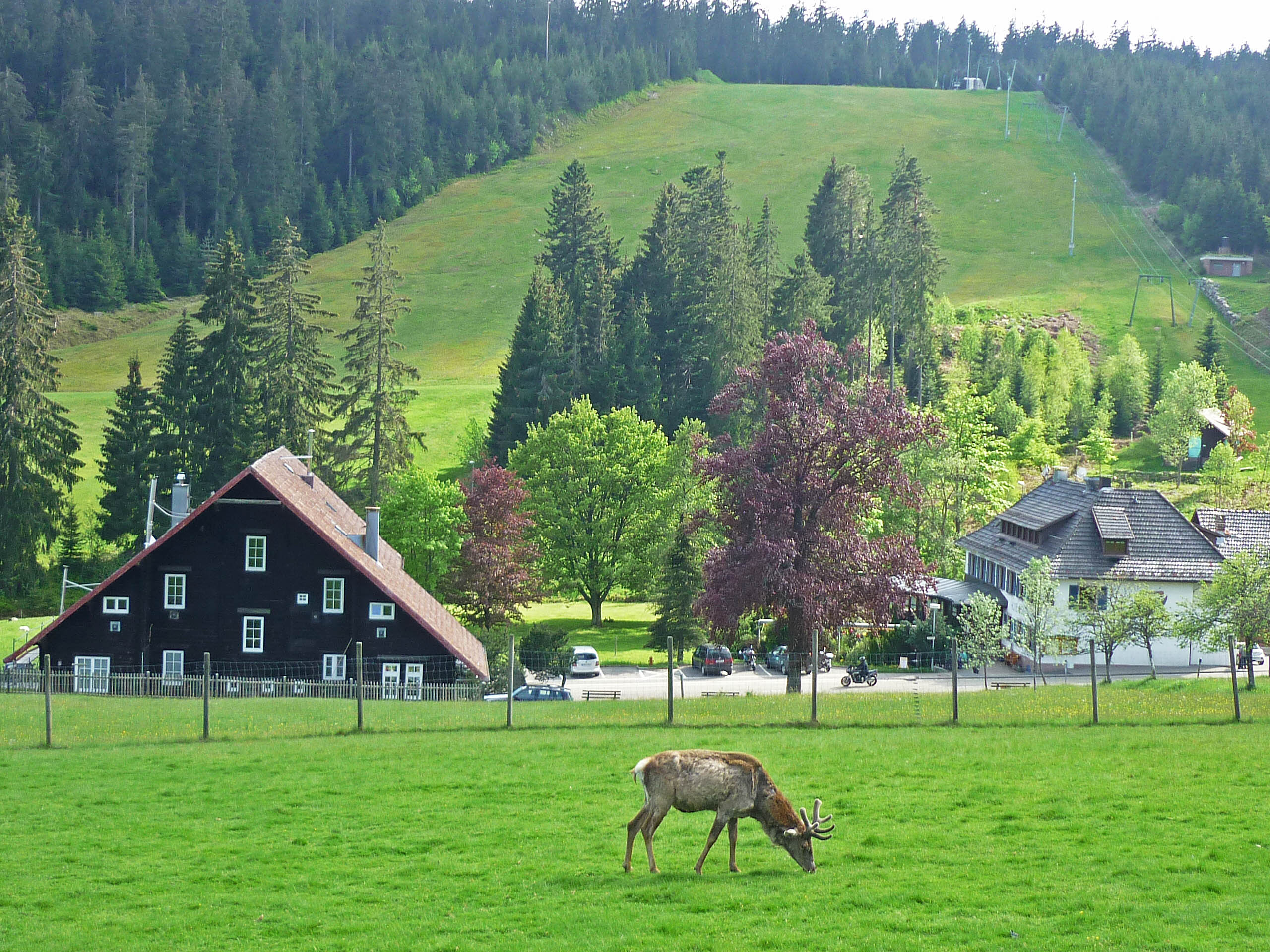
Kaltenbronn: deer enclosure, hunting lodge, hotel and ski slope

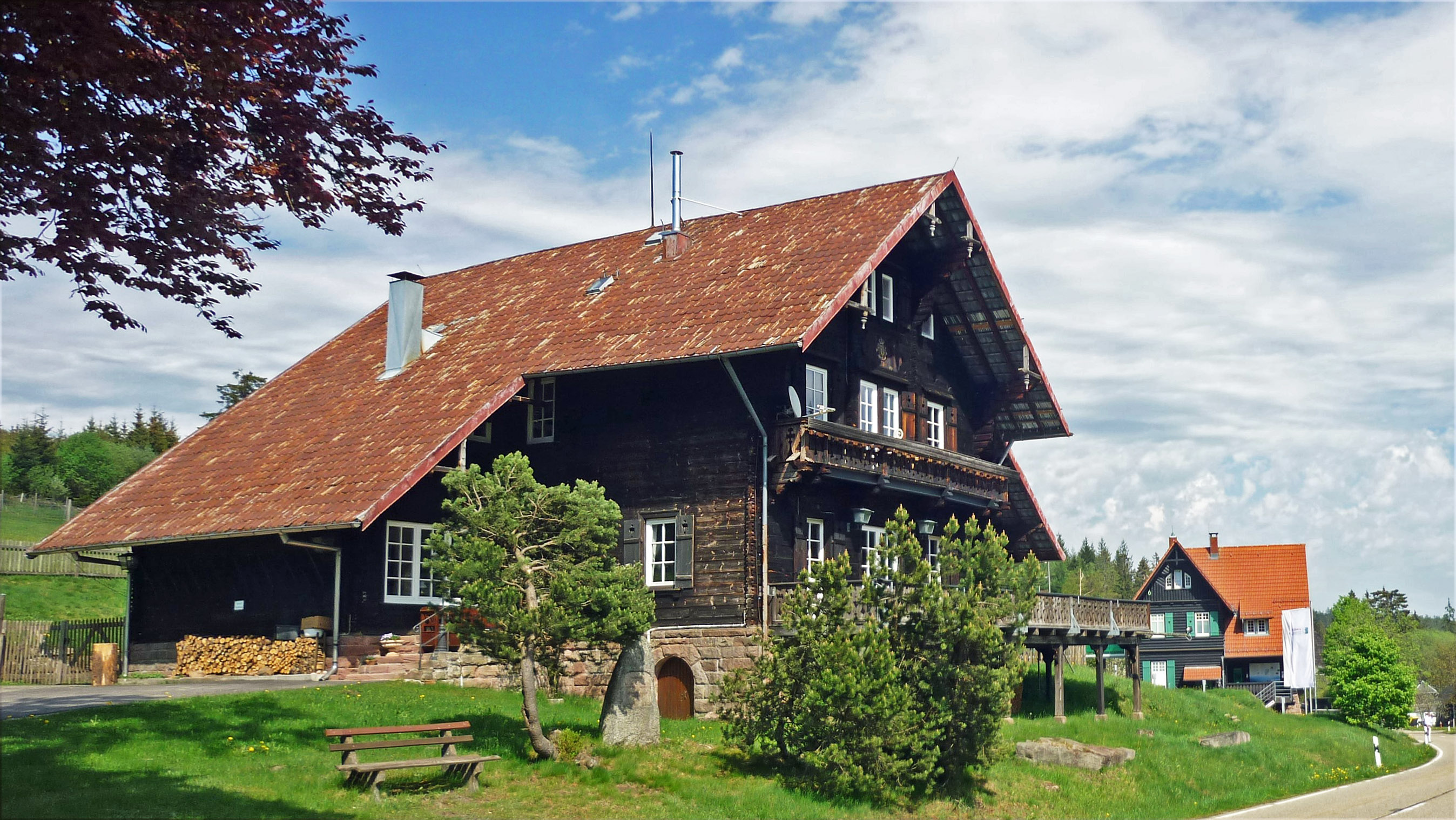
The hunting lodge. Behind: the Kaltenbronn Information Centre

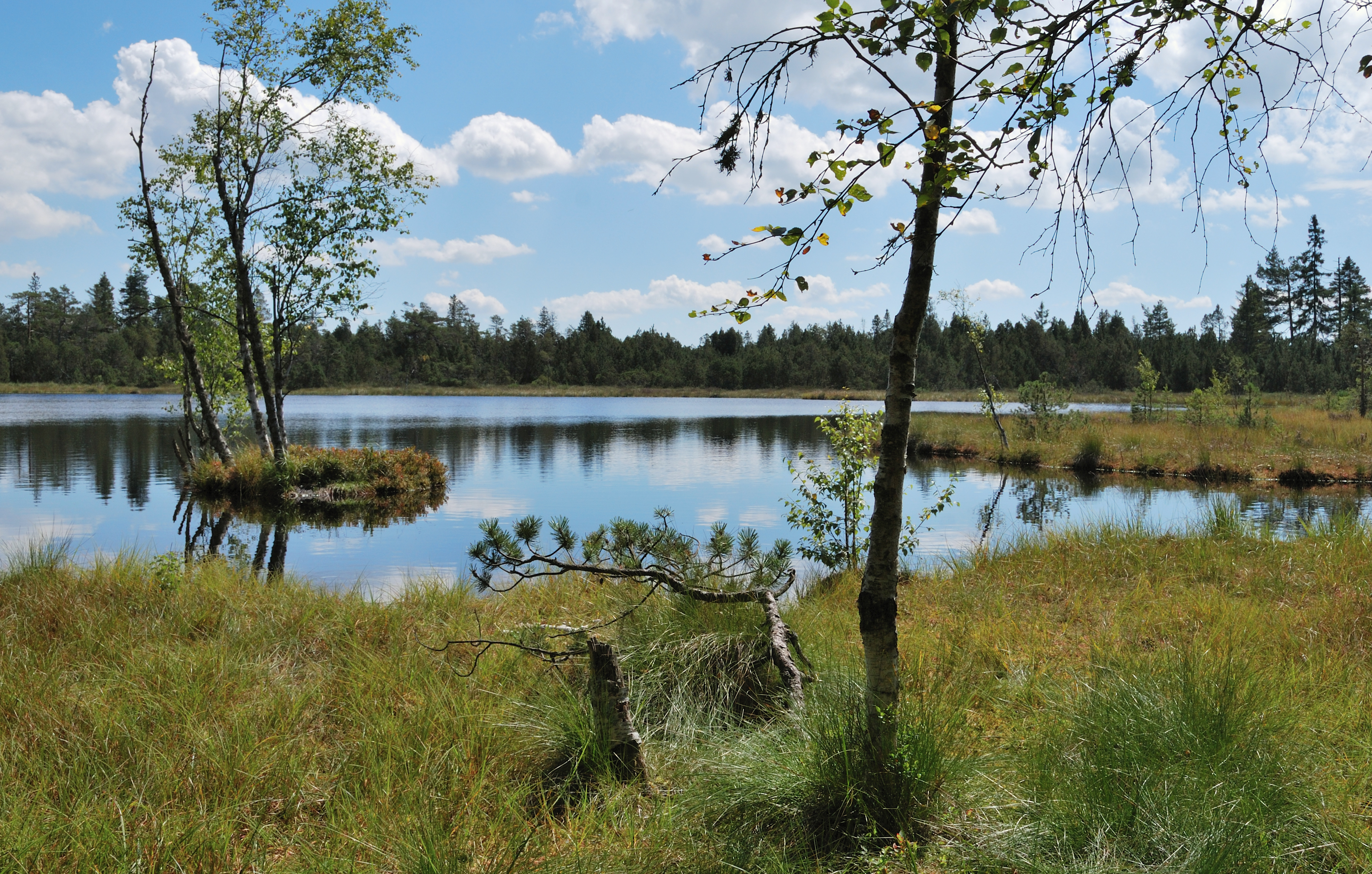
The Wildsee in the Kaltenbronn Nature and Woodland Reserve

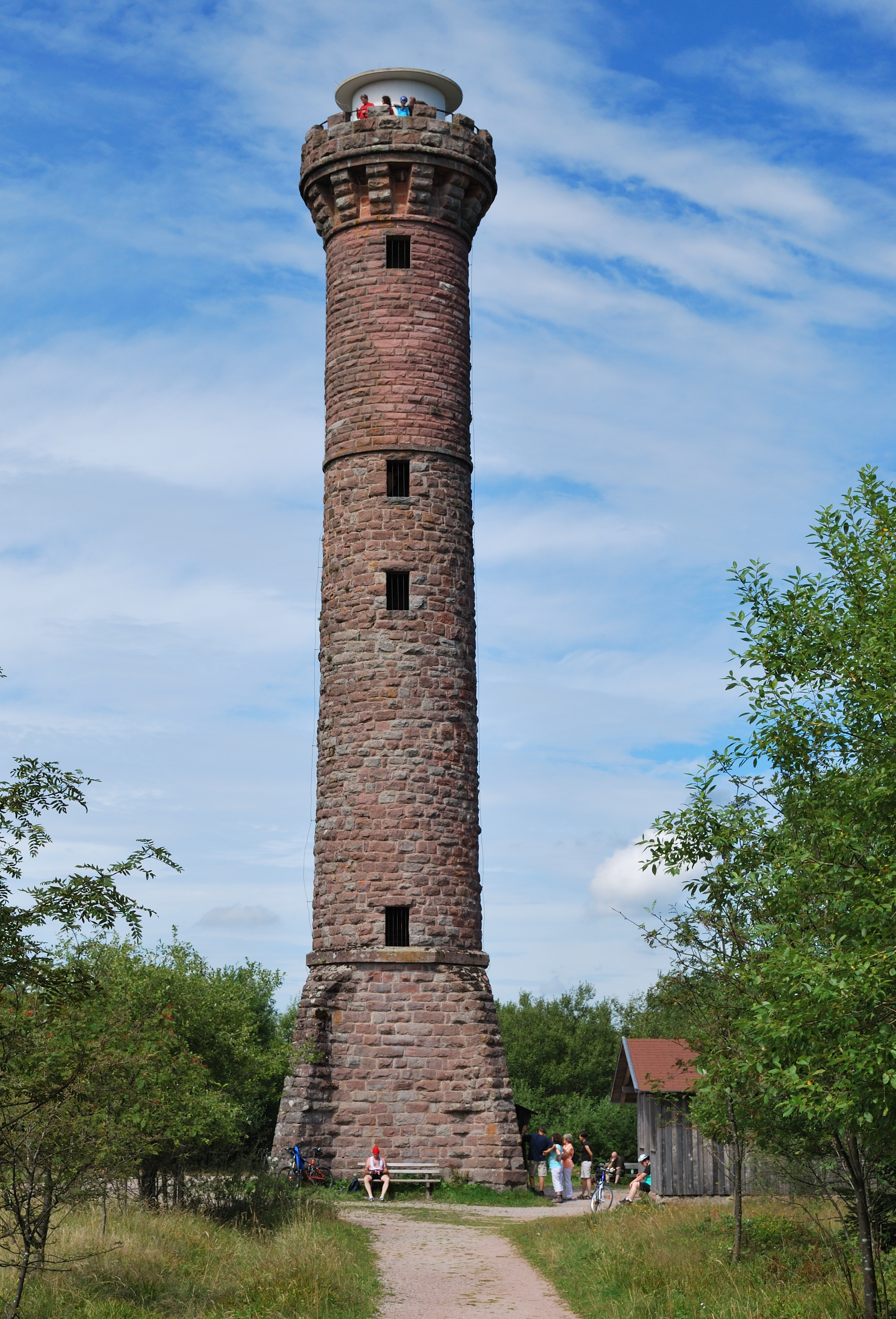
The Hohloh Tower

Kaltenbronn is a hamlet and old parish in the Black Forest in Germany that belongs to the parish of Reichental in the municipality of Gernsbach in Baden-Württemberg. The hamlet in the northern Black Forest with its hotel, forester’s lodge and former Baden hunting lodge lies a little below the top of the Schwarzmiss Pass (933 m) between the Murg and Enz valleys at a height of about 860 metres above sea level (NN) in the centre of the largest contiguous woodland in Baden-Württemberg.

Kaltenbronn is crossed by the Landesstraße 76 B, the road over the pass between the valleys of the Murg and the Enz, and is accessible by public buses from both Gernsbach and Bad Wildbad. Its average annual temperature is 6 °C and its annual precipitation is 1,600 mm. It is covered by snow for an average of 75 days per year.

== Leisure ==
Kaltenbronn is a day trippers’ destination and local recreation centre in the Central/North Black Forest Nature Park. On 1 December 2007, the Kaltenbronn Information Centre opened, providing a visitor centre and nature park gateway for the municipalities of Gernsbach, Bad Wildbad and Enzklösterle.

Kaltenbronn is the start point for trails into the nature reserves of the raised bogs of Wildseemoor and Hohlohmiss (Kaltenbronn Nature and Woodland Reserve) as well as a popular ski resort with ski lifts, a toboggan slope and extensive network of loipes. The long-distance paths of West Way and Middle Way run through Kaltenbronn. Another attraction is the deer enclosure. The entire region is covered by the Pforzheim Branch of the Black Forest Mountain Watch.

In the vicinity of the hamlet is the observation tower on the Hohloh (988 m), built in 1897 as an Emperor William tower.

== Geschichte ==
Wie Reichental gehörte Kaltenbronn ursprünglich zur Herrschaft Rotenfels, von 1387 bis 1676 war es gemeinschaftlicher Besitz (Kondominat) of the Markgrafen von Baden und of the Grafen von Eberstein, danach ging es vollständig in the Besitz of the markgräflichen Linie Baden-Baden. Bis 1872 war Kaltenbronn beim badischen Amt Gernsbach, seither liegt es im Amt bzw. Landkreis Rastatt.

Das weite und einsame Waldgebiet is Kerngebiet des Rotwildvorkommens im nördlichen Schwarzwald und war daher jahrhundertelang beliebtes Jagdgebiet für the Hochadel (unter anderem Kaiser Wilhelm II.) und ab 1954 repräsentative Staatsjagd des Landes Baden-Württemberg. Verwaltet wurde diese durch the Forstamt Kaltenbronn, zu dessen Leitern unter anderem Oberforstmeister Walter Frevert (von 1953 bis 1962) gehörte. Das traditionsreiche Forstamt wurde 1998 im Zuge einer Forstverwaltungsreform of the Landesregierung unter Ministerpräsident Erwin Teufel aufgelöst. Ein badisches Jagdhaus wurde 1740 anstelle einer Auerhahn-Hütte errichtet. Aus diesem Jagdhaus ging the Kurhotel hervor. 1869/70 wurde unter Großherzog Friedrich I. von Baden ein neues Jagdhaus (hunting lodge) erbaut, the heute ebenfalls zum Hotelbetrieb gehört. -->

== Literature ==
- Hubert Intlekofer: Geschichte des Kaltenbronn. Von Hochmoor, Wald und Kaiserjagd. Special publication by the Rastatt County Archives, Vol. 9, Casimir Katz Verlag, Gernsbach 2011, ISBN 978-3-938047-53-8.
- Landesarchivdirektion Baden-Württemberg (publ.): Das Land Baden-Württemberg. Amtliche Beschreibung nach Kreisen und Gemeinden. Vol. V, Stuttgart, 1976, pp. 167–171.
- Ludwig Schülli: Der Staatswald Kaltenbronn. Ein Beispiel für the Entwicklung of the Forstwirtschaft in the Waldungen des nördlichen Schwarzwaldes während of the letzten 200 Jahre. Schriftenreihe of the Baden-Württemberg Forestry Commission, Vol. 8. Maly, Karlsruhe, 1959.
