= Bernstein (Northern Black Forest) =

Mountain in Gaggenau, Baden-Württemberg, Germany

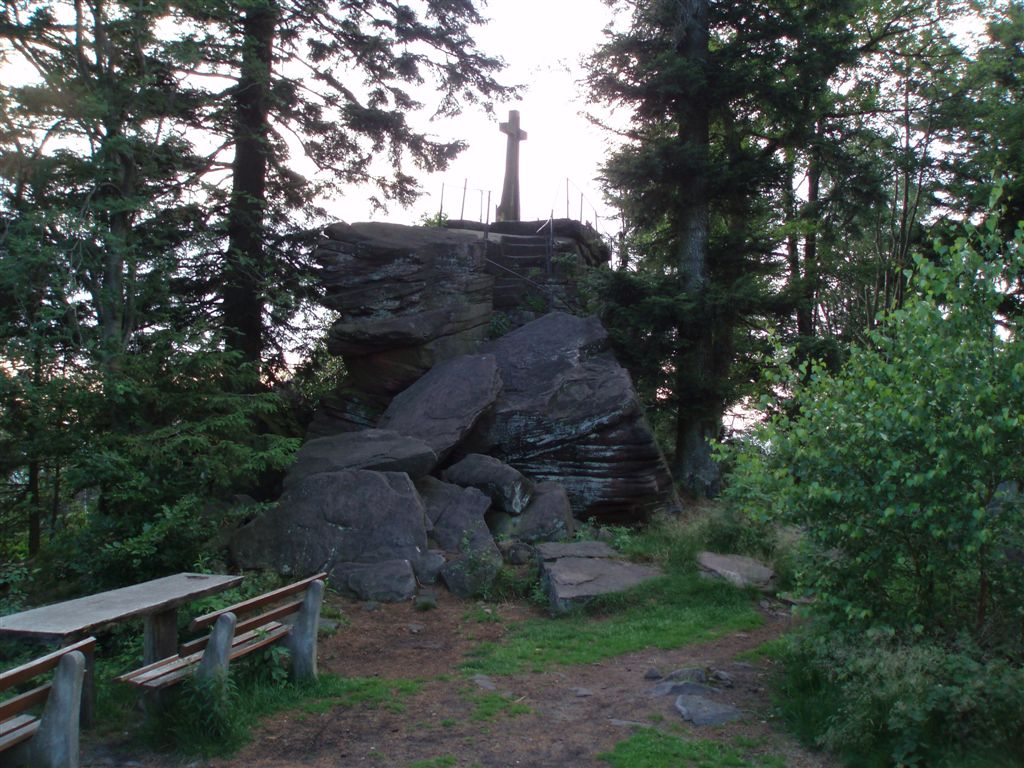
- The Bernsteinfels

Highest point
- Elevation: 693.5 m above sea level (NHN) (2,275 ft)
- Coordinates: 48°48′39″N 8°23′46″E

Geography
- Location within Baden-Württemberg
- Location: Rastatt, Baden-Württemberg, Deutschland
- Parent range: Black Forest

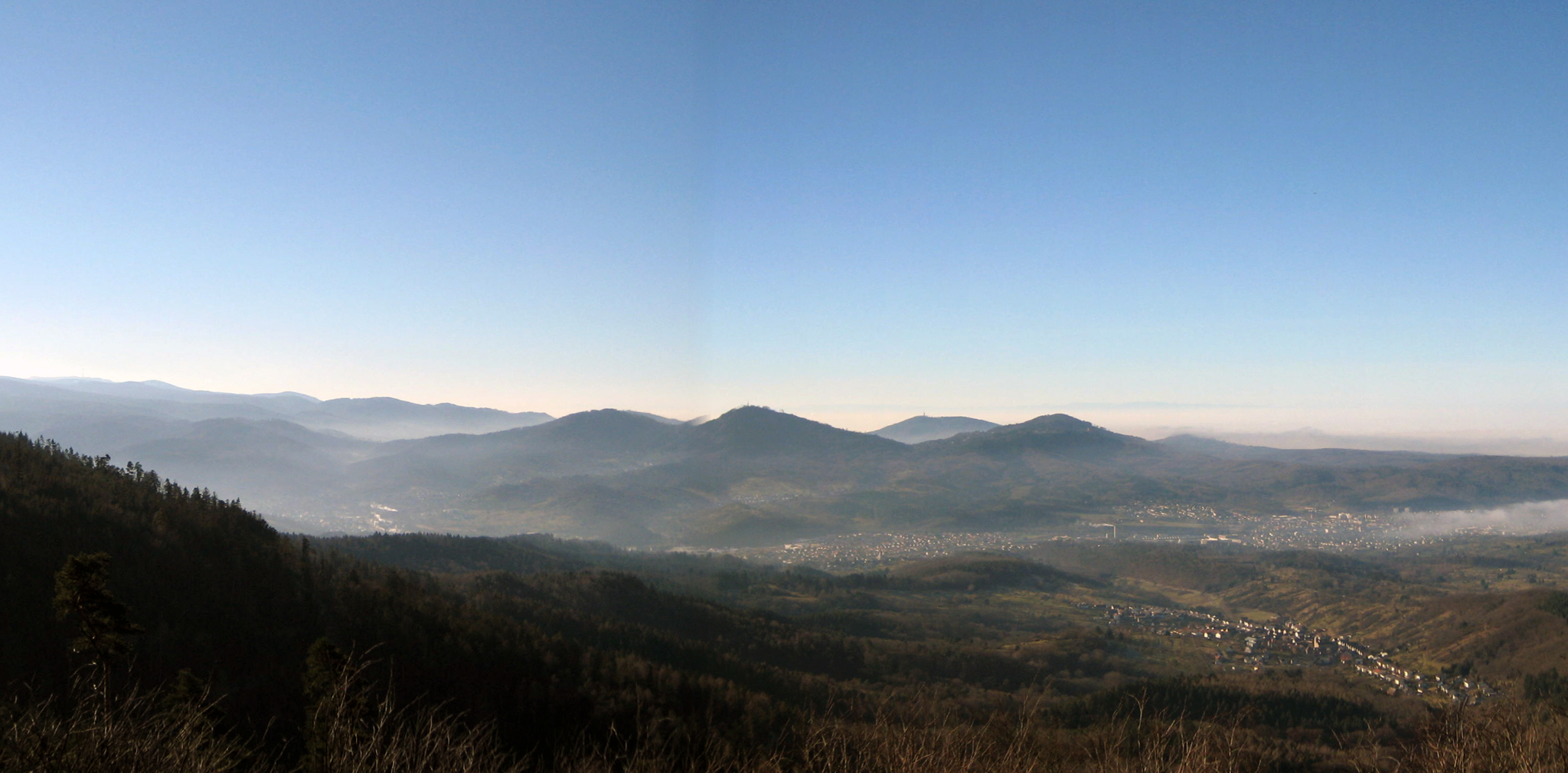
View from the Bernsteinfel looking towards the Murg valley and the foothills of the Northern Black Forest

The Bernstein is a mountain, 693.5 m above sea level (NHN), in the Northern Black Forest within the borough of Gaggenau (estate of Rotenfels), and the borough of Bad Herrenalb, (estate of Bernbach). It is part of the ridge that borders the lower Murg valley on its eastern side. The summit of this mountain is formed by a six-metre-high crag made of bunter sandstone with a flat top, 25 m² in area, from where there are good views.

== Name ==
The origin of the first part of the name, Bern, is the Old High German word, bero, which meant "bear". Bears lived in the Northern Black Forest until the Late Middle Ages. Stein ("rock") refers to block of rock that forms the summit. Bernstein is also the German word for Amber.

== Natural monument ==
The Bernsteinfels crag and its surrounding area were declared a natural monument on 5 Nov 2007 by the towns of Gaggenau and Bad Herrenalb due to its rock formations, which are unique in the region, and its geological-tectonic and natural importance, and were given protected area number 82160150001 by the Regierungspräsidium Freiburg.

== Geology ==
Geologically the origins of the Bernstein go back to the Lower Triassic, 240 million years ago. The summit block of this mountain consists of fissured Middle Bunter Sandstone. These mighty sandstone blocks are a consequence of the formation of the Upper Rhine Graben, whose sinking began about 50 million years ago. About 5 million years ago there was a marked uplifting and tilting of the edges of the graben. At that time the Bernstein crag was actually formed. Its present shape is the result of cold periods over the millennia of i.e. ice ages, that were interrupted by warm periods.

The hollow spherical formations (Kugelsandstein) on the southwest and northeast faces of the Bernstein rock are the remaines of geodes that were formed here once. They have nothing to do with Gletschermühlen or human influences, as has been repeatedly suggested.

== Main rock ==
The main rock of the Bernstein has a volume of about 200 m³. It is accessible via a stone staircase made in 1864 and has extensive, far-reaching views. In clear weather the views extend far over the lower Murg valley, for example, to Strasbourg Minster, 54 km away, to the Vosges 60–120 km away, and the mountains of the Palatine Forest 45–75 km away. The visible length of the horsing is up to 180 km.

On the main rock there is a 3-metre-high stone cross dating to 1877 and, since 1995, a semi-circular toposcope made of steel. This provides information about the direction and distance of those places and mountains that are visible over a radius of 18 km and also several more distant locations such as Karlsruhe and the Hornisgrinde as well as non-visible locations such as the Feldberg and Mont Blanc. It also gives the position of sunset on the visible horizon at the summer and winter solstices as well as at the equinoxes, with dates and times. In addition it gives the length of days (time between sunrise and sunset) in hours and minutes at the start of each season as well as the height of the midday sun (highest point of the Sun during its visible trajectory) in degrees, also at the start of the seasons. In entirely other dimensions are given the average distance from the Earth to the Moon, the Sun the orbit of the planet Pluto and the nearest star in km and light years as well as distances to the Earth's interior.

== Access ==
Several paths run up to the Bernstein. The two shortest are 3.5 kilometres long and run from Althof and Bernbach respectively (both in the borough of Bad Herrenalb), the longer and steeper routes run from Michelbach and Sulzbach (borough of Gaggenau) and from Gaggenau itself.
