= Malberg =

Malberg may refer to several places in Rhineland-Palatinate, Germany:

- Malberg, Altenkirchen
- Malberg, Bitburg-Prüm
- Malberg, a low mountain in the Westerwaldkreis

== See also ==
- Mahlberg (disambiguation)
