= Badener Höhe =

Mountain in the Black Forest

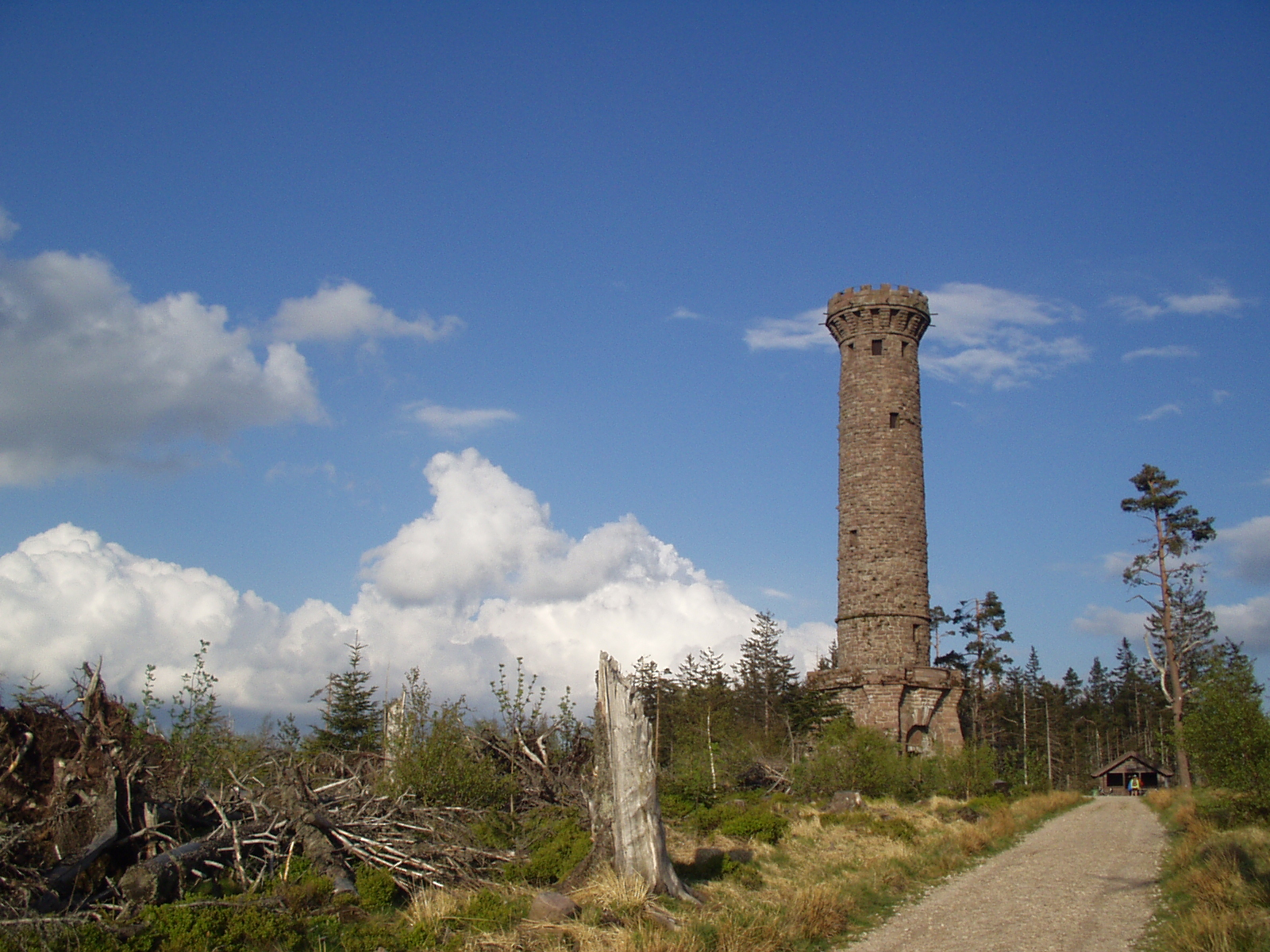
- The Friedrichsturm on the Badener Höhe

Highest point
- Elevation: 1,002.5 m above sea level (NHN) (3,289 ft)
- Listing: Highest point in Baden-Baden, Friedrichsturm (observation tower)
- Coordinates: 48°40′7″N 8°16′31″E

Geography
- Location within Baden-Württemberg
- Location: Baden-Württemberg, Germany
- Parent range: Black Forest

The Badener Höhe is a mountain in the Northern Black Forest in the German state of Baden-Württemberg. It lies within the borough of Baden-Baden and municipality of Forbach. With a height of 1,002.5 m above sea level (NHN), it is the highest point in the borough of Baden-Baden.

== Location ==
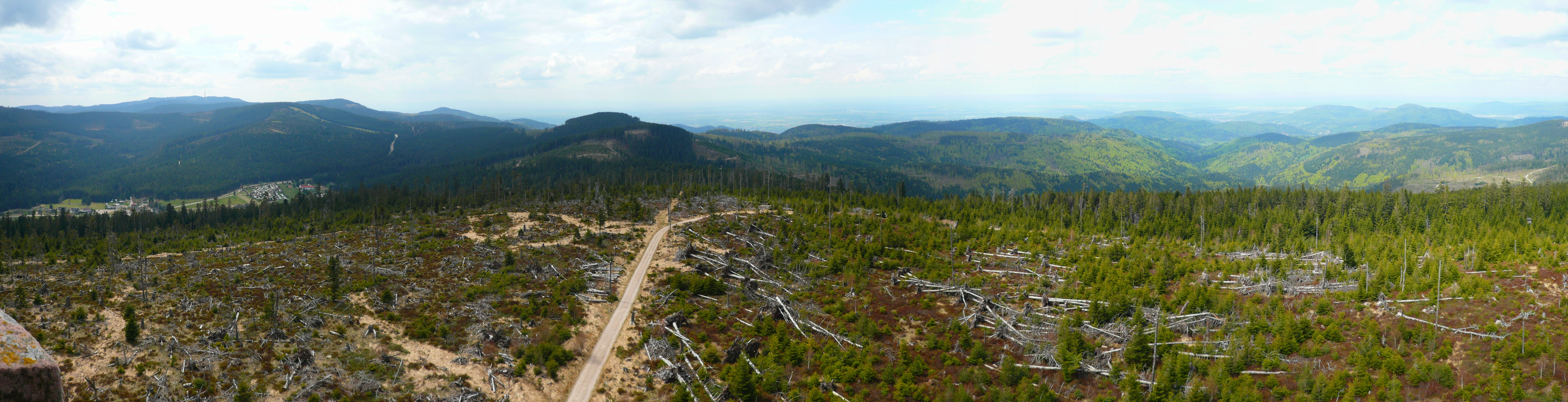
Outlook from the Frederick Tower looking west

The mountain rises above the hamlet of Herrenwies near the Schwarzenbach Reservoir. Its western and southern region is part of the Black Forest National Park.

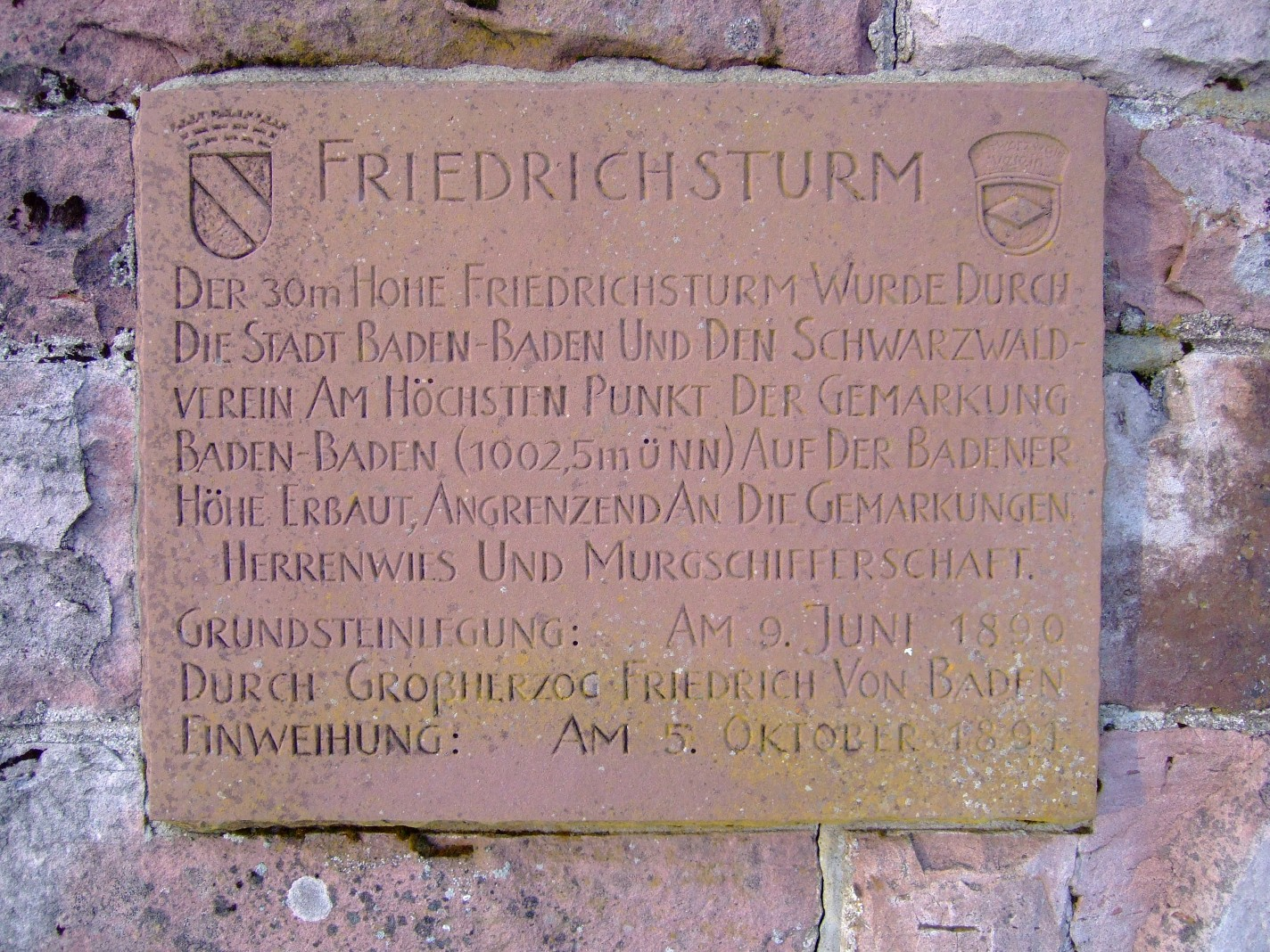
Information board on the tower

== Observation tower and views ==
On the mountaintop, besides a refuge hut, is the 30-metre-high Frederick Tower (Friedrichsturm) built in 1890 by Anton Klein from red sandstone and inaugurated on 5 October 1891 by Grand Duke Frederick I of Baden. The lookout tower is a highly visible cultural monument. From here one can see far over the northern Black Forest, inter alia to Herrenwies, the nearby mountains of Mehliskopf and Hornisgrinde. To the north, on a very clear day, the Großer Feldberg, the Taunus hills and the Melibokus in the Odenwald Forest may be seen. To the north-northwest is the Palatinate Forest and, in good weather, even the Donnersberg may be seen. To the west, in France, rise the Vosges. In extremely good visibility some summits of the Swiss Alps may be visible to the far south-southeast. The panoramic view extends to the east to Swabian Jura. The tower was built in 1884 on the establishment of the Baden-Baden branch of Black Forest Club. In 2002, the tower had to be closed for safety reasons. Thanks to a fundraiser, the necessary restoration works were carried out quickly and the tower was re-opened on 19 June 2003.

== Tourism ==
The Badener Höhe is now a popular hiking and excursion destination that is well linked to many hiking trails (such as the West Way or Westweg). The forest on the summit of the Badener Höhe fell victim to several storms, including Hurricane Lothar.
