= Wildsee (Kaltenbronn) =

Lake in the Northern Black Forest, Germany

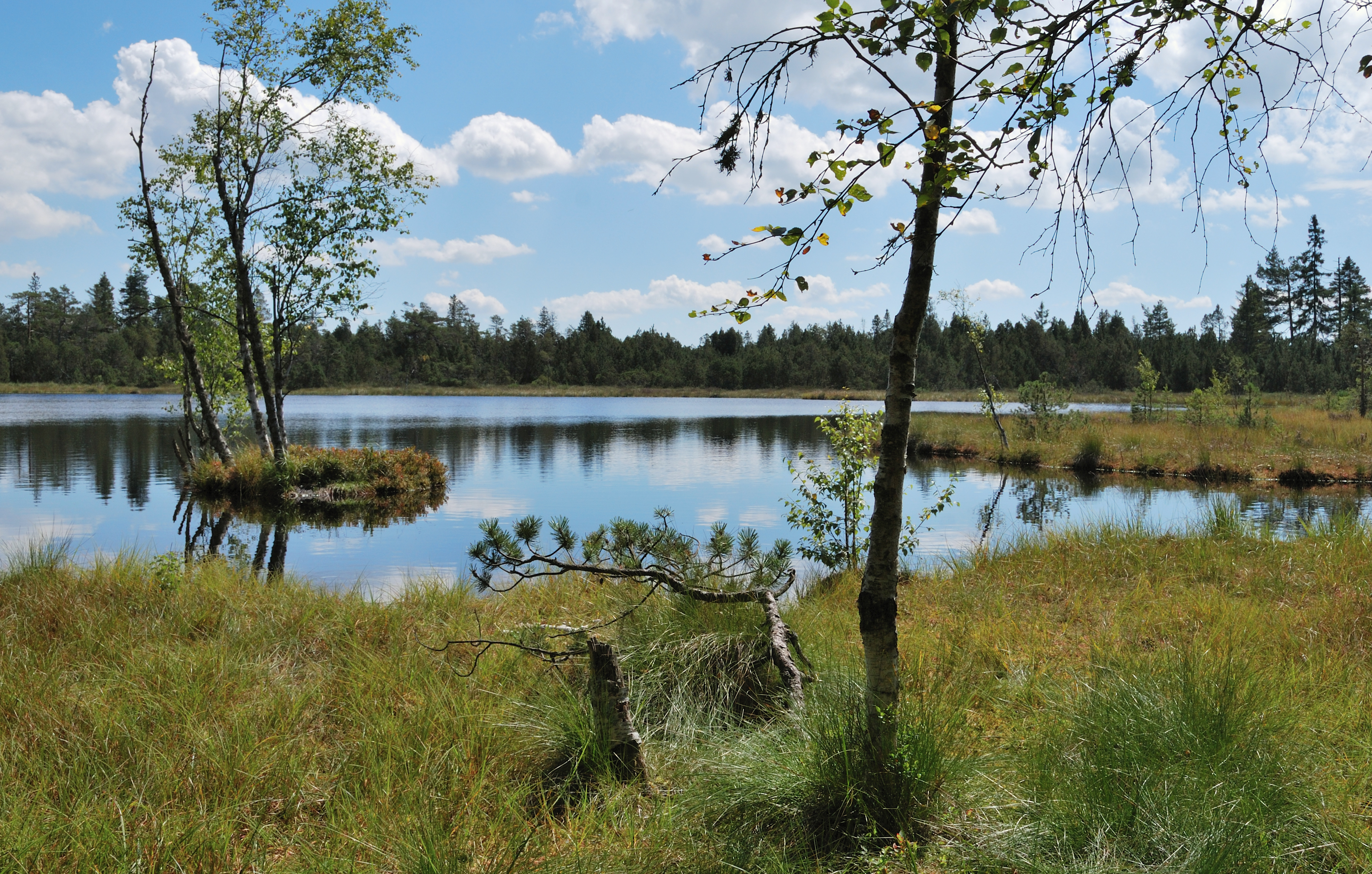

- Location within Baden-Württemberg
- Location: Black Forest, Baden-Württemberg
- Coordinates: 48°43′6″N 8°27′33″E
- Primary inflows: Seegraben
- Primary outflows: Seegraben → Brotenaubach
- Basin countries: Germany
- Surface area: 1.15 ha (2.8 acres)
- Surface elevation: 909 m (2,982 ft)

The Wildsee is a small lake within an area of bog between Bad Wildbad and Gernsbach, high in the Northern Black Forest mountain range in southwestern Germany. The lake is fed by rain water. It is part of the Kaltenbronn Nature Reserve.

The area has a geological base of sandstone. The sandstone developed a rich brown soil, which originally allowed the European Beech to grow. In the later development of forestry, the Norway Spruce and European Pine (Pinus sylvestris) were introduced. These three tree species can be found in the vicinity of the lake.

== Location ==
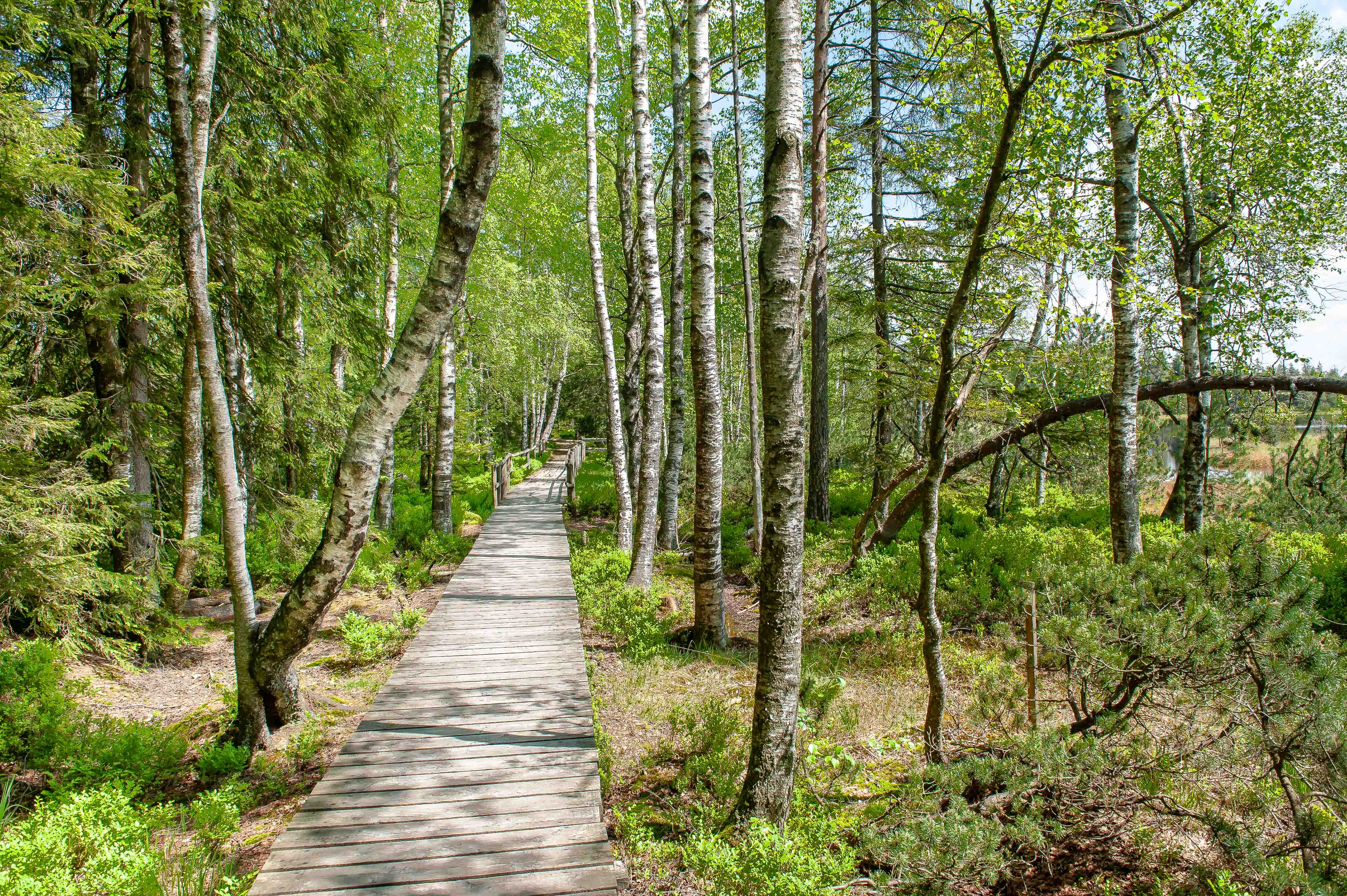
Board walk by the Wildsee

The Wildsee is located at a height of 909 m above sea level (NN) on a plateau between Bad Wildbad, Gernsbach and Forbach. The surface area of the lake has been estimated as 2.3 hectares since work in the early 20th century by Karl Müller. More recent data from the Baden-Württemberg State Office for the Environment, Survey and Conservation estimates its area as 1.15 hectares. Immediately adjacent is the smaller Hornsee (0.43 hectares). The nearest settlement with road links is Kaltenbronn, about 2 kilometres to the southwest. The boundary between the municipalities of Gernsbach (county of Rastatt) and Bad Wildbad (county of Calw) runs through the Wildsee and its associated nature reserve. The Hornsee belongs to Gernsbach.

== Formation ==
At the end of the last ice age (about 10,000 years ago), impervious, bunter sandstone beds and high levels of precipitation caused the formation of the boggy terrain in this area. As a result of incomplete decomposition, a peat layer, up to eight metres thick, was formed in the Wildsee Bog (Wildseemoor). The thicker the peat layer, the lower the supply of nutrients for plants growing on it. The result is a vegetation of relatively undemanding plants (shrubs, mosses, cottongrasses).

== Conservation ==
The bog landscape, including the Wildsee and the Hornsee, is a near-natural raised bog with bog forests that have been placed under protection (Wildseemoor Nature Reserve, 183.2 ha), in order to encourage the development of the raised bog, and pine and spruce forest ecosystems on its perimeter, with their special animal and plant species. In addition, the region around the lake is protected as Bannwald (Wildseemoor Bannwald, 291 ha). With the Hohlohsee Nature Reserve and surrounding areas of protected forest, the Wildseemoor has been merged since 2000 into the Kaltenbronn Nature and Forest Reserve (1,750 ha).

== Tourism ==
The moorland landscape is crossed by a board walk built by the Black Forest Club, which passes directly over the lake. The waymarks of the Middle Way hiking trail from Pforzheim to Waldshut lead around the nature reserve.

== See also ==
- Another lake with the same name, the Wildsee at Ruhestein, which belongs to Baiersbronn, lies 23 kilometres to the southwest, near the Black Forest High Road.
- List of lakes in Germany

== Literature ==
- Karl Müller: Das Wildseemoor bei Kaltenbronn. Verlag G. Braun, Karlsruhe, 1924.
