= Reichental, Baden-Württemberg =

Reichental
- Stadtteil of Gernsbach
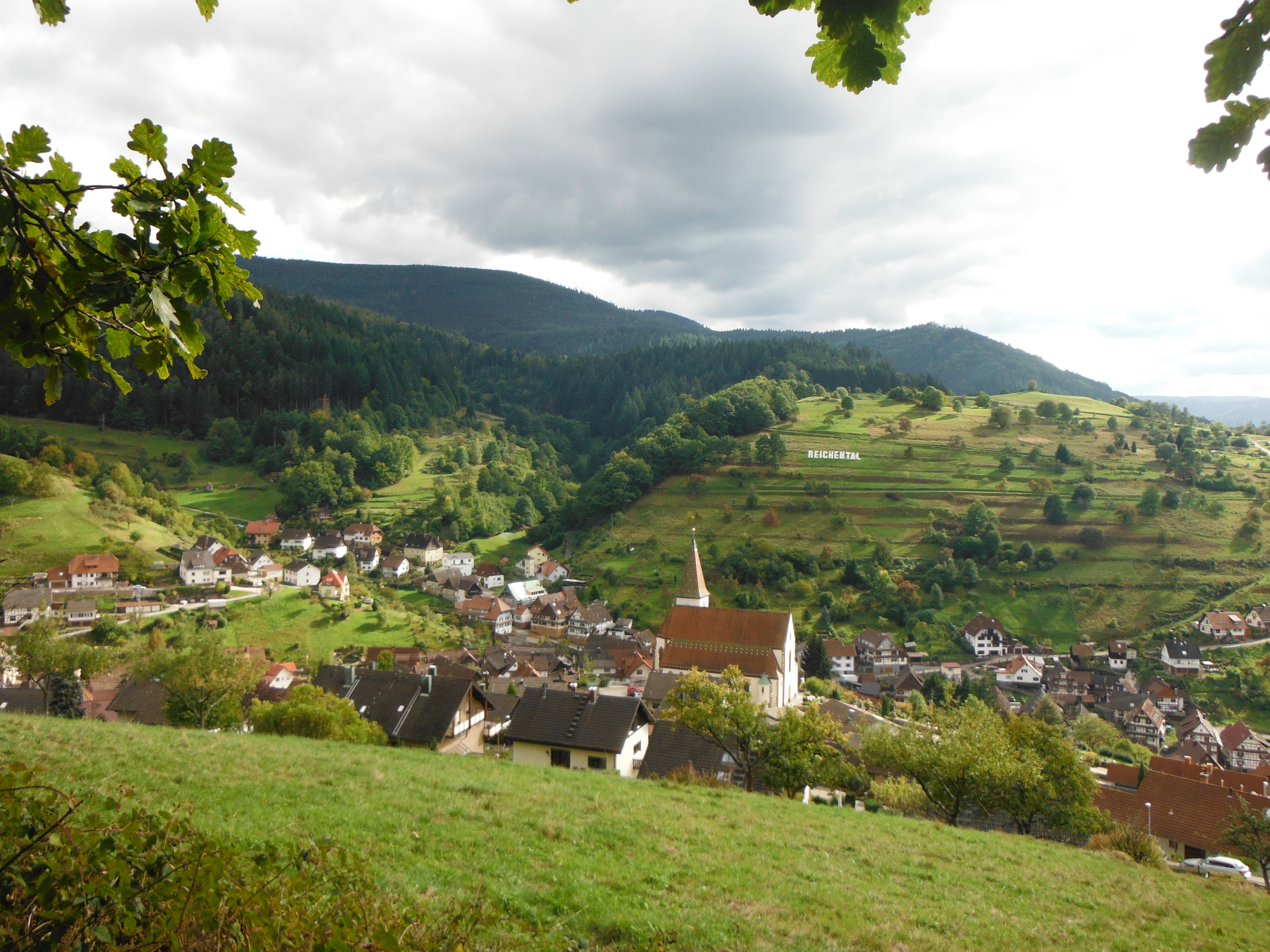
- View over Reichental from the Fatima Chapel

- Coat of arms
- Interactive map of Reichental
- Location within Germany Location within Baden-Württemberg
- Coordinates: 48°43′44″N 8°23′26″E
- Country: Germany
- State: Baden-Württemberg
- Admin. region: Karlsruhe
- District: Rastatt
- Town: Gernsbach

Area
  - Total: 47.197 km^{2} (18.223 sq mi)
- Elevation: 176 m (577 ft)

Population
  - Total: 800
  - Density: 17/km^{2} (44/sq mi)
- Time zone: UTC+01:00 (CET)
  - Summer (DST): UTC+02:00 (CEST)
- Postal codes: 76593
- Dialling codes: 07224

Reichental is a village in Baden-Württemberg, Germany. It is administratively part of the town of Gernsbach in the Rastatt district.

== Geography ==
The village is located south-east of Gernsbach on the Reichenbach stream, a tributary of the Murg River. The hamlet of Kaltenbronn to the south is part of Reichental.

== History ==
The first documented mention of Reichental is as 'Richental' in the year 1339–1340. On January 1, 1975, Reichental was incorporated into the town of Gernsbach
