= Northern Black Forest =

Forest in Germany

Coordinates: 48.275°N 8.183°E

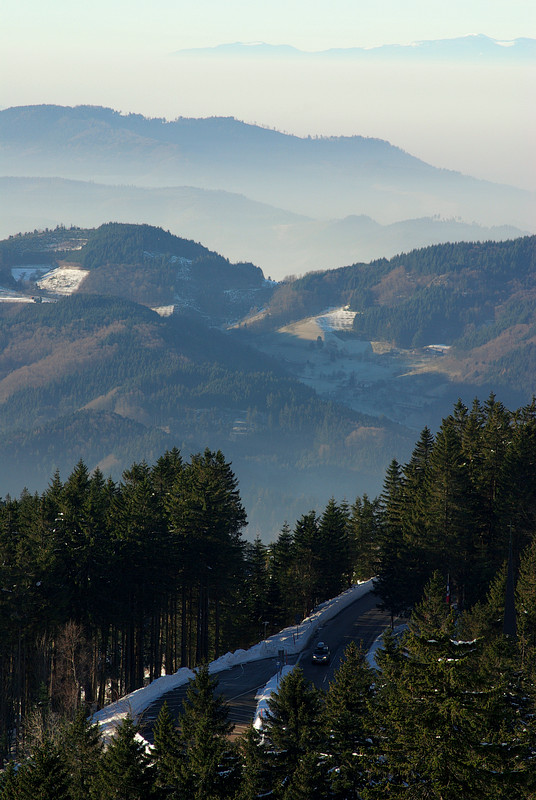
Western side of the Northern Black Forest on the Hornisgrinde showing the steep descent to the Upper Rhine Plain. In the background: the Vosges

The Northern Black Forest (German: Nordschwarzwald) refers to the northern third of the Black Forest in Germany or, less commonly today, to the northern half of this mountain region.

== Geography ==
The Northern Black Forest is bounded in the north by a line from Karlsruhe to Pforzheim and, in the south, by a line running from the Rench valley to Freudenstadt. Its northern boundary largely coincides with the emergence of the extensively forested bunter sandstone strata from the arable region of the Kraichgau; its southern boundary with the Central Black Forest (or, in the case of a bipartite division, the Southern Black Forest) varies depending on the definition or natural regional division used (see also Black Forest). Earlier, the Northern Black Forest was the entire northern half of the mountain range as far as the line of the Kinzig valley, which divides the Black Forest east of Lahr. To the west it is bounded by the Upper Rhine Plain, to the east by the Gäu landscapes.

The Northern Black Forest is not the same as the spatial-planning region of Northern Black Forest, which covers the eastern area.

== Landscape and geology ==
With its rather angular – in places trapezoidally-shaped – summits, the Northern Black Forest rises above the Rhine Plain by more than 1,000 m. By contrast, its eastern slopes descend gradually and there is less of a height difference with its neighbouring regions. Its highest peak is the Hornisgrinde at 1,163 m above sea level (NHN). Woods cover on average 73% of the whole land area and make the Northern Black Forest the most cohesive forested part of the Black Forest, but there are also extensive areas of so-called "Grinden": treeless, wet heaths, on its highland slopes.

Geologically, the dominant rock of the Northern Black Forest is bunter sandstone, although in the deeply incised west its gneiss bedrock reaches the surface. Granites (e.g. Forbach granite) and porphyries have intruded forming crags and tors. The highland regions of the Northern Black Forest are among the regions of the German Central Uplands with the heaviest rainfall (up to 2,200 mm per annum). Its most important rivers are the Murg, Nagold, Enz, Alb, Acher, Rench, Oos and the upper reaches of the Wolf.

In 2001, the Central and Northern Black Forest Nature Park (Naturpark Schwarzwald Mitte/Nord) was established and its coverage includes the whole of the Northern Black Forest. In addition, an area of about 10,000 hectares has been designated since 1 January 2014 as the Black Forest National Park. It has numerous highly popular tourist attractions as well as winter sport areas in addition to the towns named below and the Black Forest High Road and Kaltenbronn.

== Towns and villages in the Northern Black Forest (selection) ==
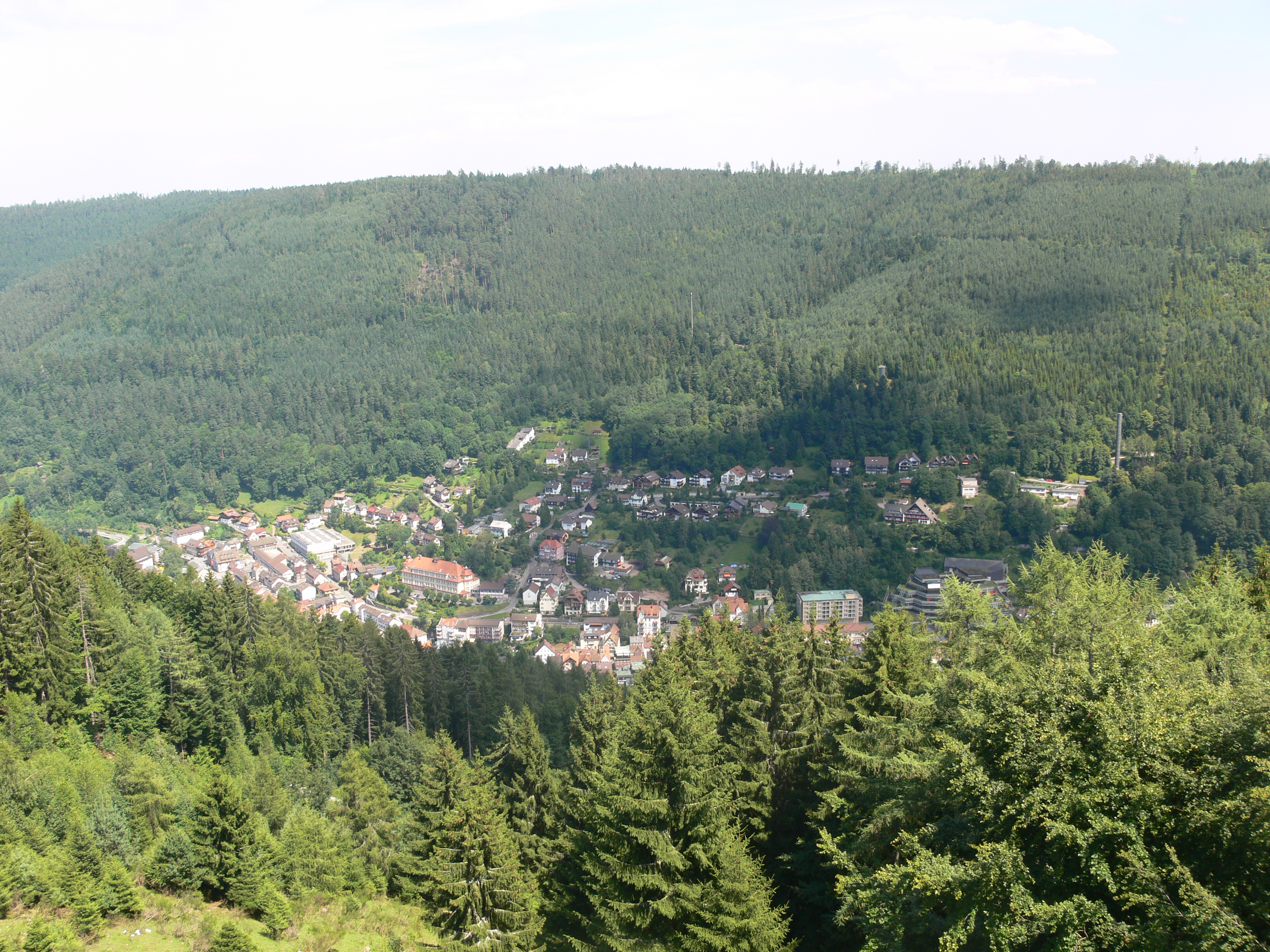
Bad Wildbad

- Altensteig
- Althengstett
- Baden-Baden
- Bad Herrenalb
- Bad Liebenzell
- Bad Peterstal-Griesbach
- Bad Teinach
- Bad Wildbad
- Baiersbronn
- Bühlertal
- Calw
- Dobel
- Enzklösterle
- Forbach
- Freudenstadt
- Gaggenau
- Gernsbach
- Loffenau
- Loßburg
- Nagold
- Neubulach
- Neuenbürg
- Oberreichenbach
- Pforzheim
- Pfalzgrafenweiler
- Sasbachwalden
- Schömberg
- Seebach

== Mountains (selection) ==
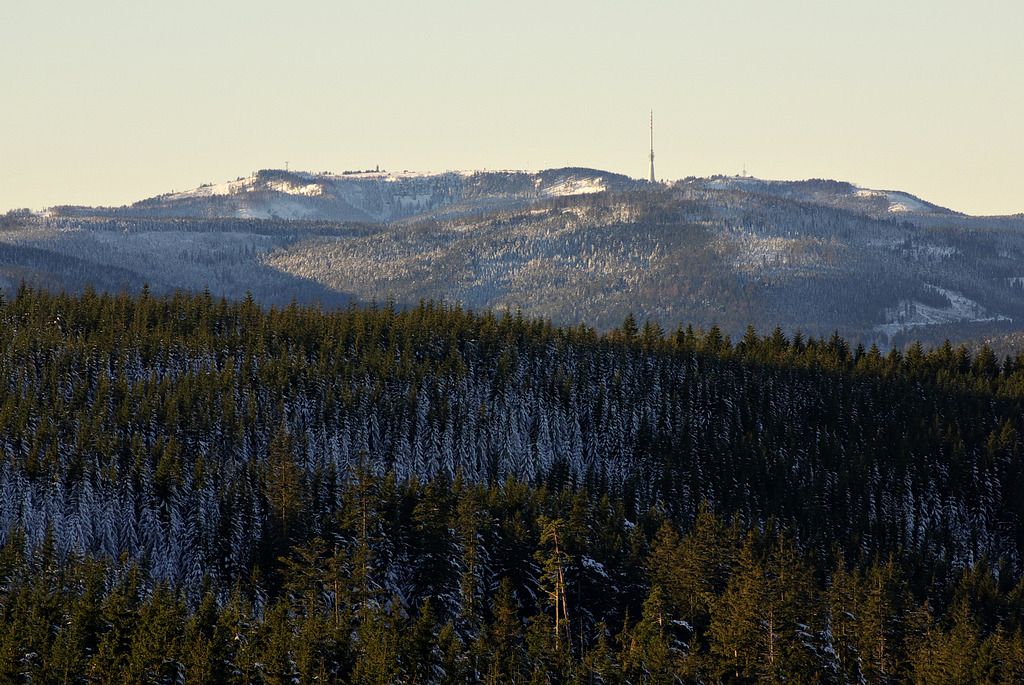
The Hornisgrinde seen from the Hohloh

- Bernstein
- Badener Höhe
- Battert
- Fremersberg
- Hochkopf
- Hoher Ochsenkopf
- Hohloh
- Hornisgrinde
- Kniebis
- Mahlberg
- Mehliskopf
- Merkur
- Schliffkopf
- Sommerberg
- Teufelsmühle
- Vogelskopf

== Lakes ==
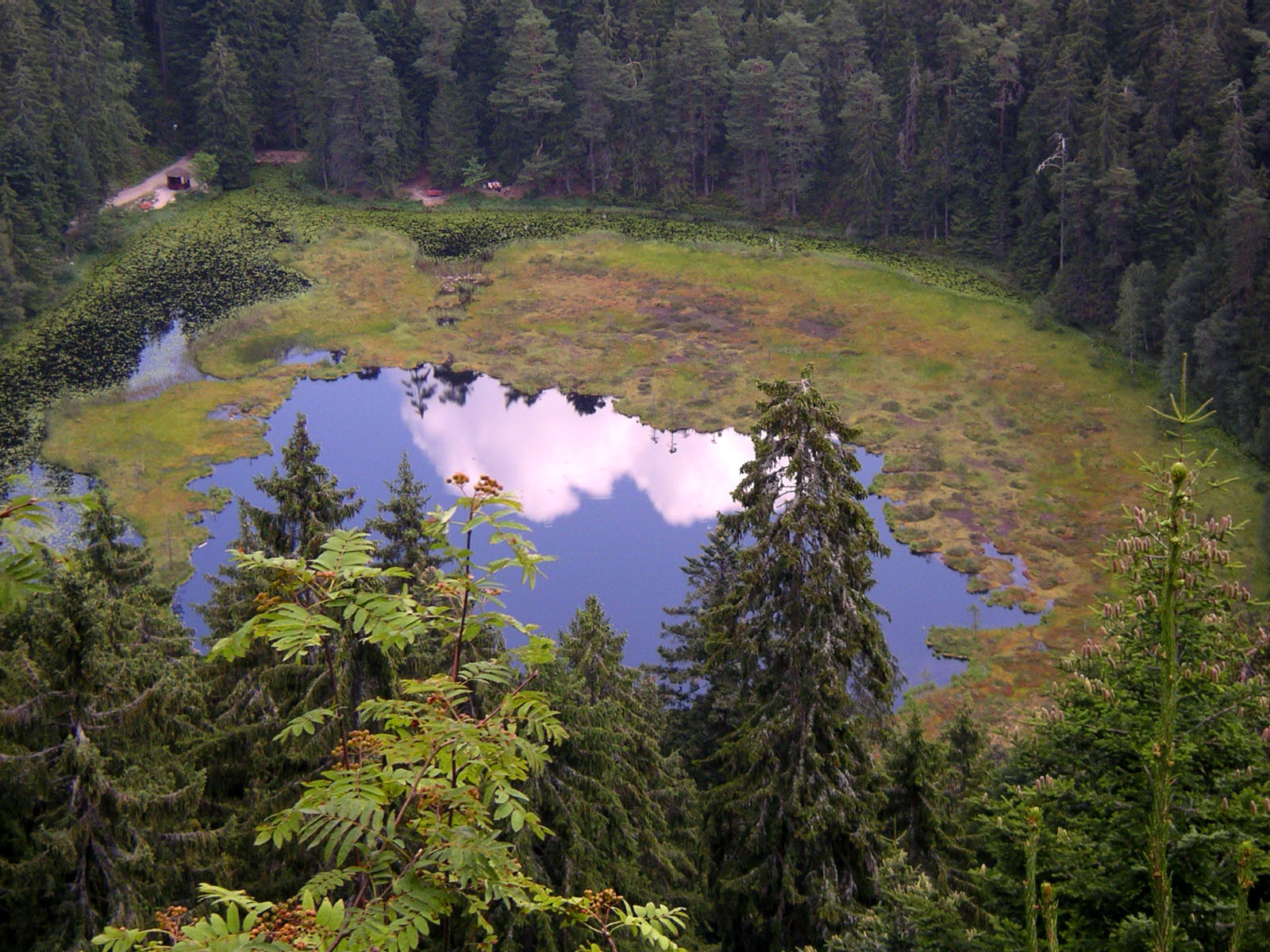
The Huzenbacher See, one of the tarns in the Northern Black Forest

Numerous tarns in the Northern Black Forest are evidence of ice age glacial formations, The best-known is the Mummelsee on the Hornisgrinde. Other tarns are the Ellbachsee, Herrenwieser See, Huzenbacher See, Sankenbachsee, Schurmsee and the Wildsee near Ruhestein. Many of them were also impounded in order to supply excess water for timber rafting which was common until the 19th century. Other former tarns have silted up.

The Hohlohsee and the Wildsee near Gernsbach-Kaltenbronn are raised bog lakes on the highlands between the Murg and Enz valleys that are only fed by local precipitation.

There are several dams in the Northern Black Forest. The Schwarzenbach Dam and the Murg Dam are part of the Rudolf-Fettweis-Werk, a pumped storage and run-of-the-river power station in Forbach. The Nagold Dam regulates the water level of the Nagold. The Kleine Kinzig Dam is used for drinking water, water regulation and electricity generation.

== Tourism ==
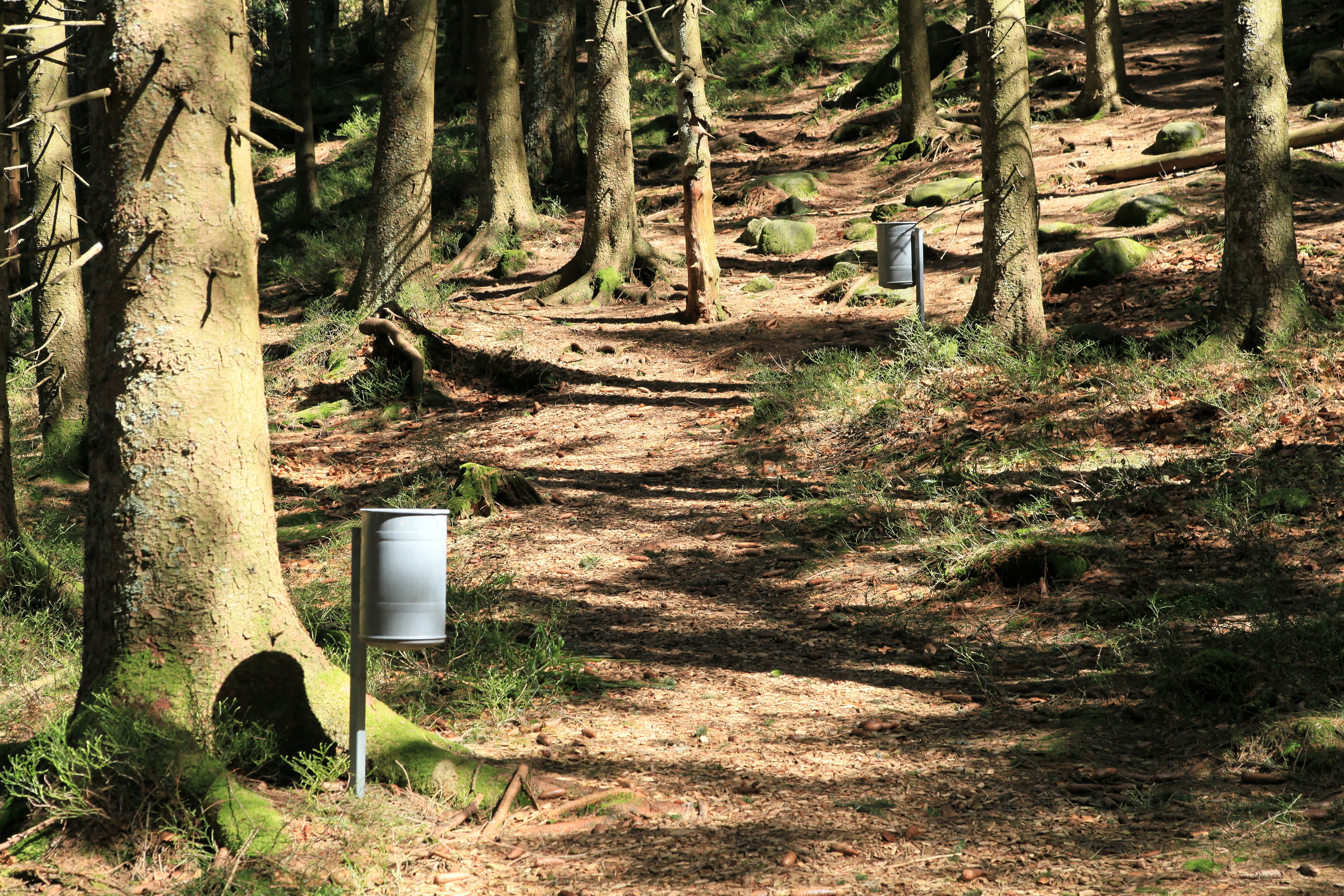
Hiking trail at the Mummelsee

Due to the vast preserved natural scenery, the region is popular among hikers.

=== Hiking trails (selection) ===
- Panorama hike: Hornisgrinde – Mummelsee – Wildsee – Karlsruher Grat – Edelfrauengrab waterfalls (20 km, duration 6:30 h)
- Maulbronn Monastery hike: Mühlacker station – Wannenwald (alongside the historical Landesdefensionslinie) – Maulbronn (17.3 km, duration 4:30 h). The Maulbronn Monastery is considered the best preserved medieval monastery north of the Alps.
- Bernsteinfels circular hike: Bad Herrenalb – Bernsteinfels ("amber rock") – Wasenhütte (14.3 km, duration: 4:30 h)

In the winter time, the Northern Black Forest region attracts tourists with the ski resorts Mehliskopf, Hundseck – Bühlertallifte, Kaltenbronn, Simmersfeld.

== See also ==
- Waterfalls in the Northern Black Forest
- Central/North Black Forest Nature Park

== Literature ==
- Sönke Lorenz (ed.): Der Nordschwarzwald. Von der Wildnis zur Wachstumsregion. Markstein-Verlag, Filderstadt, 2001, ISBN 3-935129-01-7
- Rudolf Metz: Mineralogisch-landeskundliche Wanderungen im Nordschwarzwald, besonders in dessen alten Bergbaurevieren. 2nd, full revised edition, Schauenburg, Lahr, 1977, ISBN 3-7946-0128-9

Wander- & Reiseführer, Bilderbücher

- Bernhard Pollmann: Schwarzwald Nord und Mitte. Bergverlag Rother, 2003, ISBN 3-7633-4031-9, Wanderführer
- Wolfgang Benz: Schwarzwald Nord. Wanderführer mit Tourenkarten und Wandertipps. Deutscher Wanderverlag D. Mair & Schnabel & Co. 2003, ISBN 3-8134-0063-8
- Cornelia Ziegler: Schwarzwald - Der Norden. Reise Know-How-Verlag 2000, 264 pp., über 80 Fotos, 16 Karten und Stadtpläne, ISBN 978-3-89416-837-7
- Baedeker: Schwarzwald. Baedeker Allianz-Reiseführer, Ostfildern, 2006, 466 pp., ISBN 978-3-8297-1069-5
- HB Bildatlas: Schwarzwald Norden. HB Verlag 2004, 113 pp., ISBN 978-3-616-06172-6

Film

- Bilderbuch Deutschland: Der nördliche Schwarzwald. documentary, 45 min., a film by Willy Meyer, SWR, first broadcast: 5 March 2006.
