= Mehliskopf =

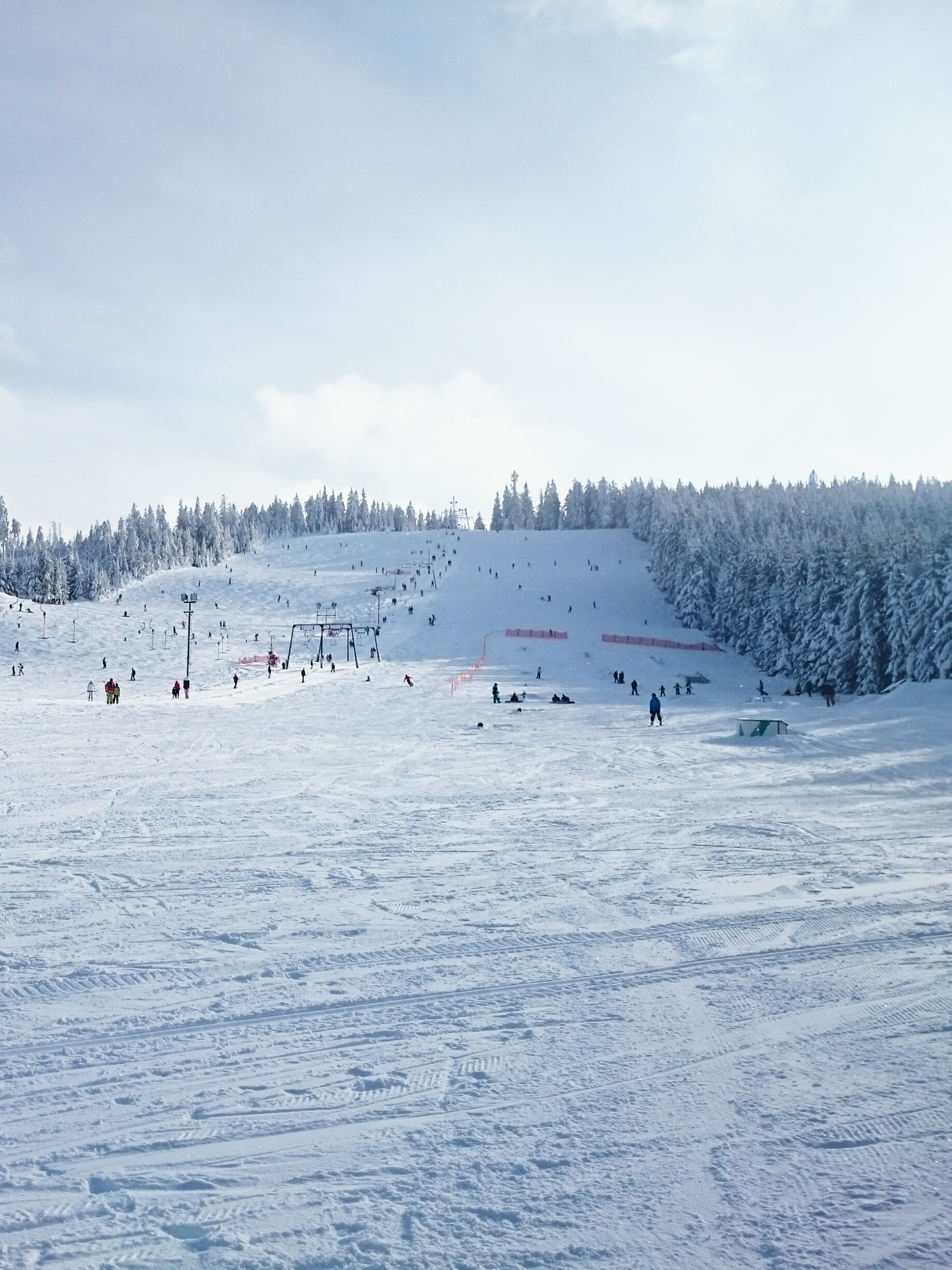
- Ski piste on the Mehliskopf

Highest point
- Elevation: 1,008 m above sea level (NHN) (3,307 ft)
- Coordinates: 48°38′57″N 8°14′25″E

Geography
- Location within Baden-Württemberg
- Location: Baden-Württemberg, Germany
- Parent range: Black Forest

The Mehliskopf is a mountain, 1,007.8 m above sea level (NHN), on the main chain of the Northern Black Forest in Germany. It lies above the Black Forest High Road, between Sand (junction to Herrenwies and the Schwarzenbach Dam) and Hundseck (junction to Forbach-Hundsbach). On the north flank of the mountain there is ski piste with lifts and an all-year-round bobsleigh run. Nearby is a climbing garden and an adventure playground.

There is another piste on the southwestern side of the mountain. Its valley station is on the Black Forest High Road near Hundseck.

On the western edge of the summit plateau stands the Mehliskopf Tower (Mehliskopfturm). This 11-metre-high observation tower was built in 1880 by the Black Forest Club and has been renovated several times since. It has a stone plinth with a wooden, covered, observation platform.
