= Moosbronn =

Coordinates: 48°50′12″N 8°23′18″E

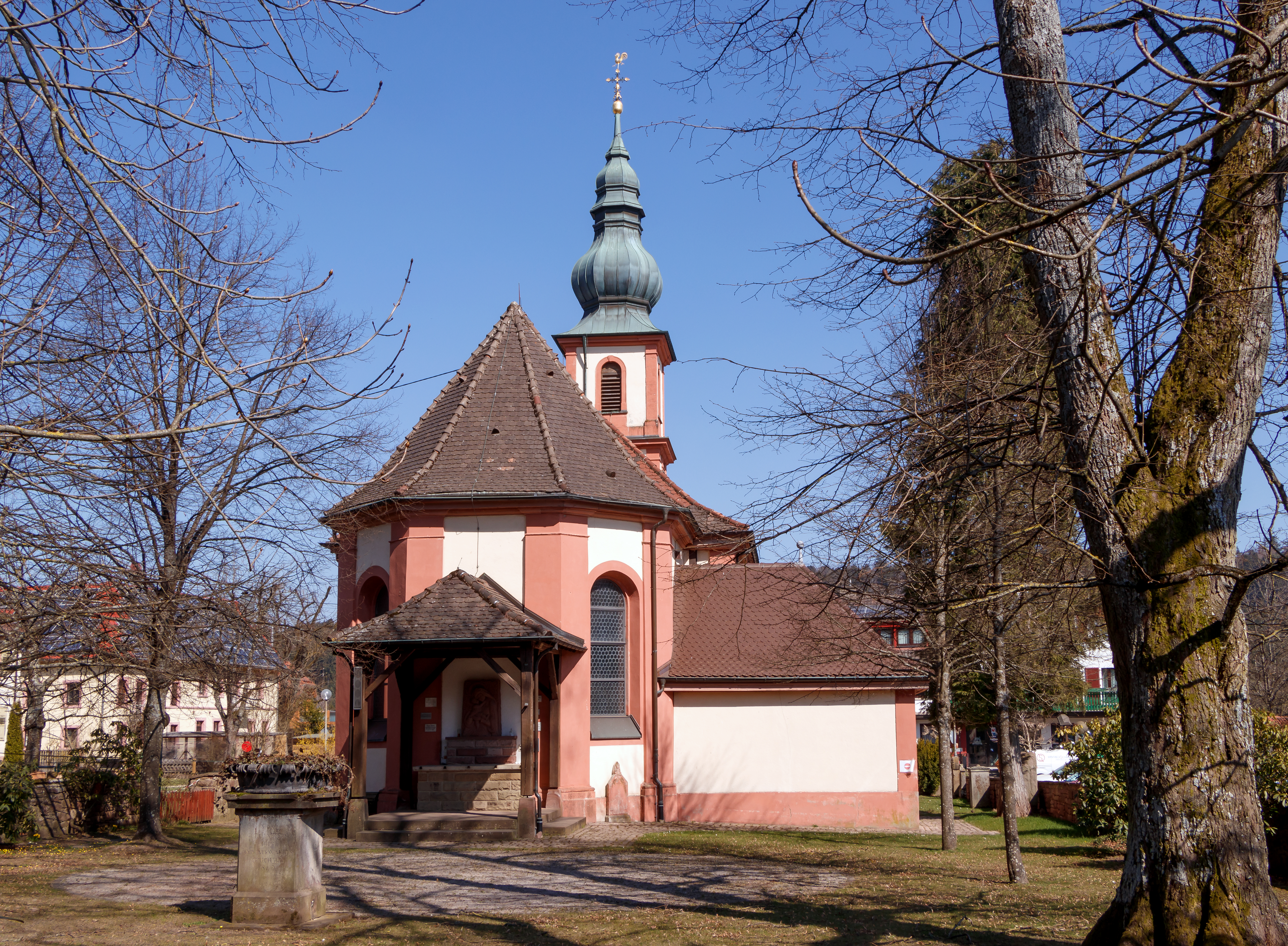
Pilgrimage chapel

Moosbronn is a village in Germany in one of the deepest parts of the northern Black Forest, about 25 km south of Karlsruhe. It is a famous place of pilgrimage and belongs to the municipality of Gaggenau.
