= Schwarzenbach Dam =

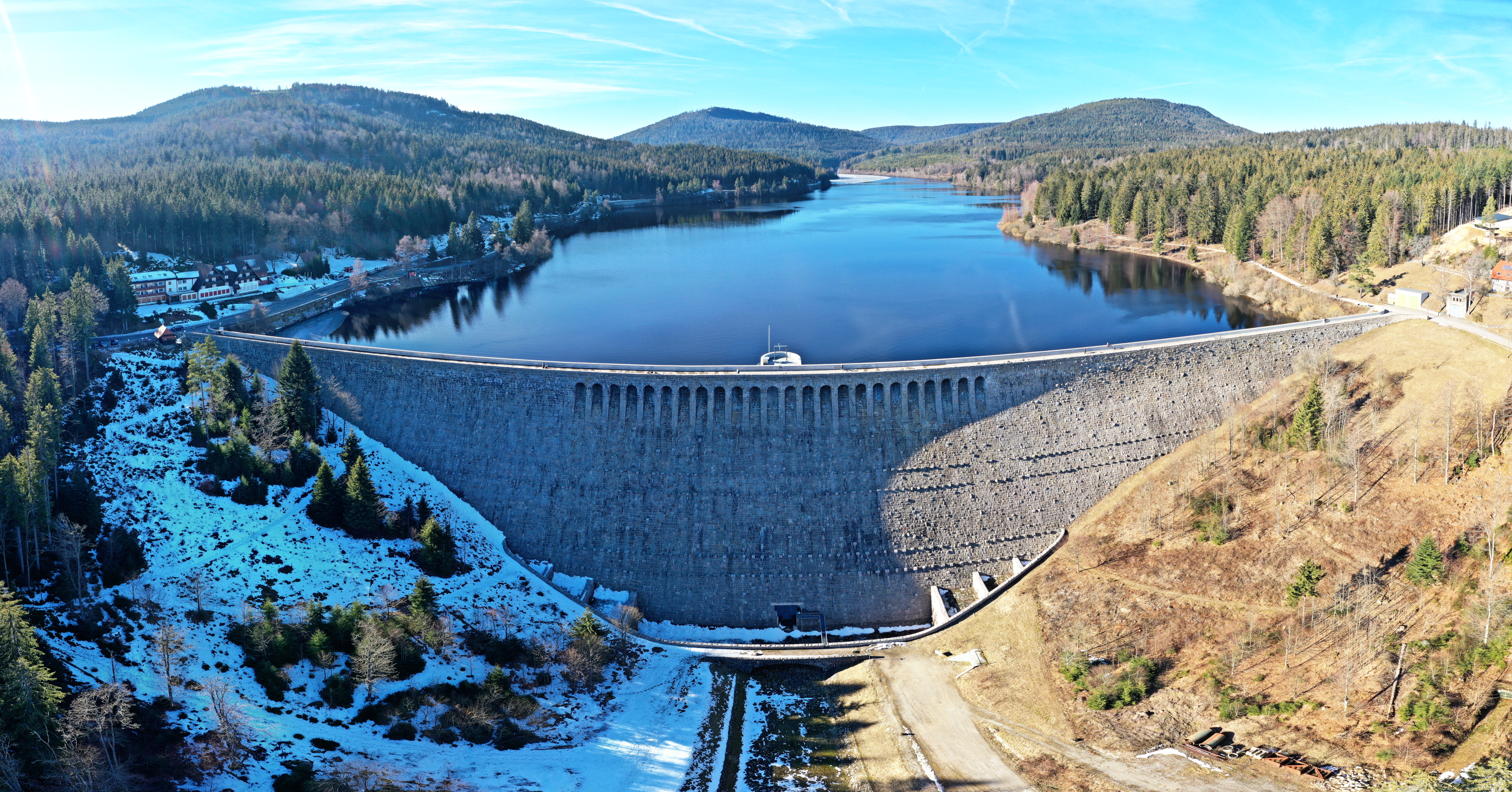
- The dam

- Location within Germany
- Country: Germany
- Coordinates: 48°39′17″N 8°19′46″E
- Purpose: Power
- Status: Operational
- Construction began: 1922
- Opening date: 1926

Dam and spillways
- Type of dam: Gravity
- Height: 65 m (213 ft)
- Length: 400 m (1,300 ft)

Reservoir
- Total capacity: 14.4×10^{6} m^{3} (11,700 acre⋅ft)

The Schwarzenbach Dam (German: Schwarzenbachtalsperre) is a gravity dam near Forbach in the Northern Black Forest of Germany. It is the most important structure of the Rudolf-Fettweis-Werk's pumped storage power station. The operator of the dam, which was completed in 1926 in a side valley of the Murg valley, is EnBW Kraftwerke.

== Description ==
The reservoir collects the water on the eastern slopes of the rainy main crest of the Northern Black Forest, below the mountains of Hornisgrinde, Mehliskopf and Badener Höhe. The Schwarzenbach and Seebach streams are directly impounded, the water of the Biberach and Hundsbach (headstreams of the Raumünzach) are led by galleries from neighbouring valleys. In addition, the water of the Murg from the Murg Dam is pumped into the reservoir. The dam system provides load balancing in the energy supply. Its maximum output is 44 megawatts (59,000 hp).

== Leisure ==
The Schwarzenbach Reservoir is a popular recreation destination with the Central/North Black Forest Nature Park. It is a base for hiking tours and also has facilities for swimming, fishing and windsurfing. Near the dam wall is a hotel (closed since 2011); in its vicinity is a boat hire stand. The Black Forest National Park borders its southern shore.

== See also ==
- List of dams in Germany

== Literature ==
- Manfred Fieting: Die Schwarzenbach-Talsperre und das Murg-Hochdruckwerk, Sutton Verlag, Erfurt, 2003, ISBN 978-3-89702-633-9.
