= Wildsee (Ruhestein) =

Lake in Baden-Württemberg, Germany

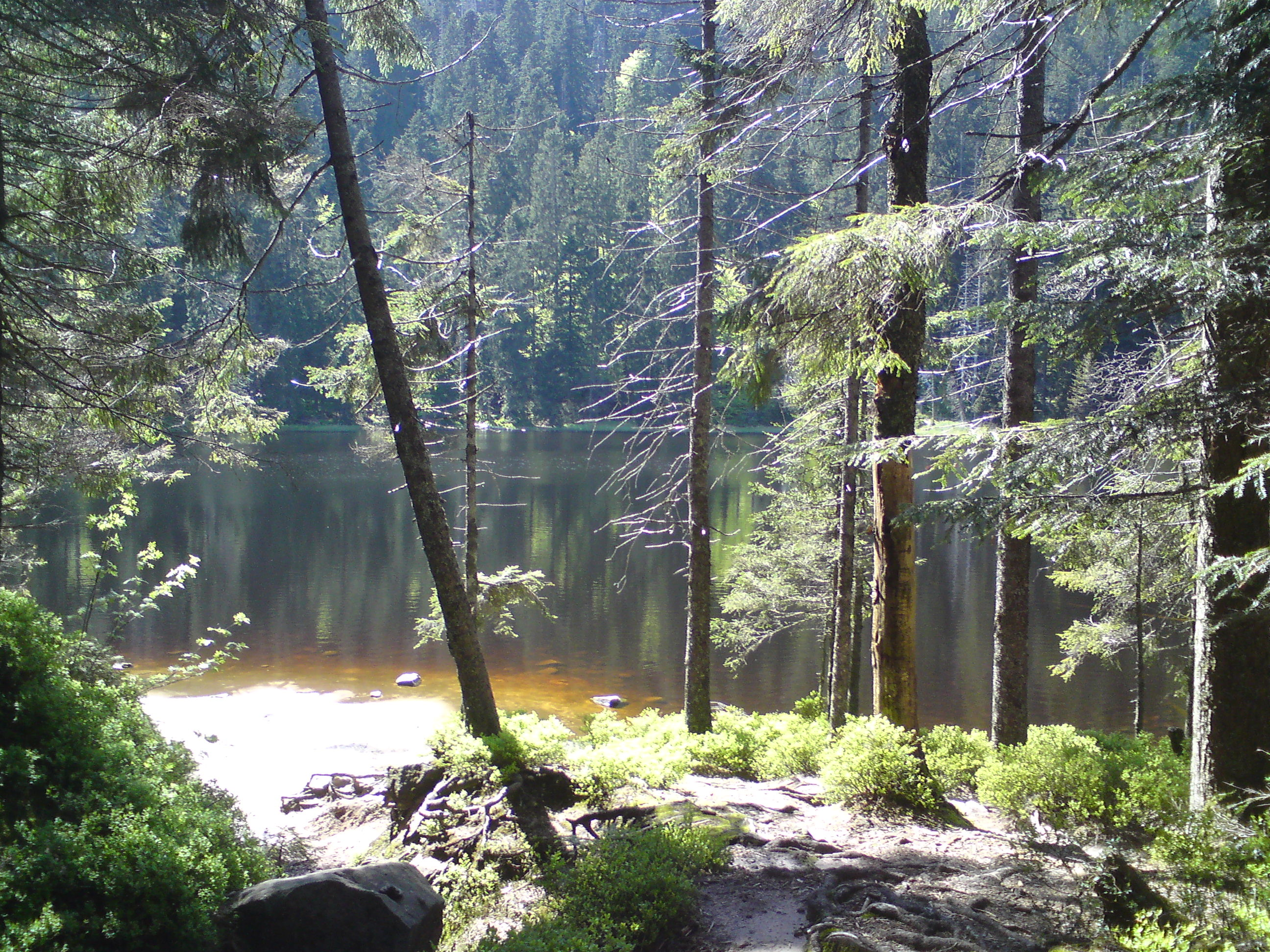

- Location within Baden-Württemberg
- Location: Black Forest, Baden-Württemberg
- Coordinates: 48°34′11″N 8°14′22″E
- Basin countries: Germany
- Surface area: 2.4 ha (5.9 acres)
- Surface elevation: 910 m (2,990 ft)

Wildsee is a small tarn within a cirque in the Black Forest near Baiersbronn, Germany. It is part of the Black Forest National Park and the Wilder See - Hornisgrinde Nature Reserve.
