= Central/North Black Forest Nature Park =

Nature park in Baden-Württemberg, Germany

Central/North Black Forest Nature Park (Naturpark Schwarzwald Mitte/Nord)
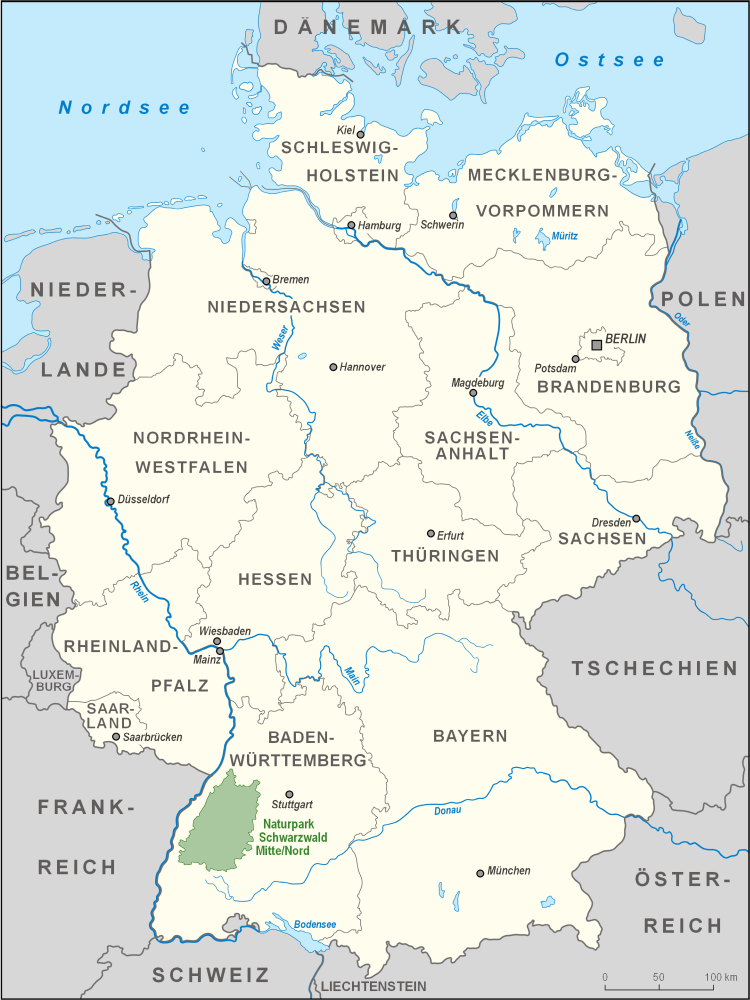
- Map
- Location: Baden-Württemberg (Germany)
- Established: 2000

The Central/North Black Forest Nature Park (German: Naturpark Schwarzwald Mitte/Nord) is located in Baden-Württemberg in Germany. It covers an area of 3,750 km^{2} and was founded in December 2000. As of 2018, it is the third-largest nature park in Germany.

In 2014, the Black Forest National Park opened within the Central/North Black Forest Nature Park.

== Location ==
It is a maximum of 90 km from north to south and 65 km wide and covers the counties of Calw, Freudenstadt, Karlsruhe, Rastatt, Rottweil, Enzkreis, Ortenaukreis, Baden-Baden and Pforzheim with 105 municipalities in which around 700,000 people live. The Black Forest National Park is located within the nature park. To the south, it is adjoined by the Southern Black Forest Nature Park.

== Nature and landscape ==
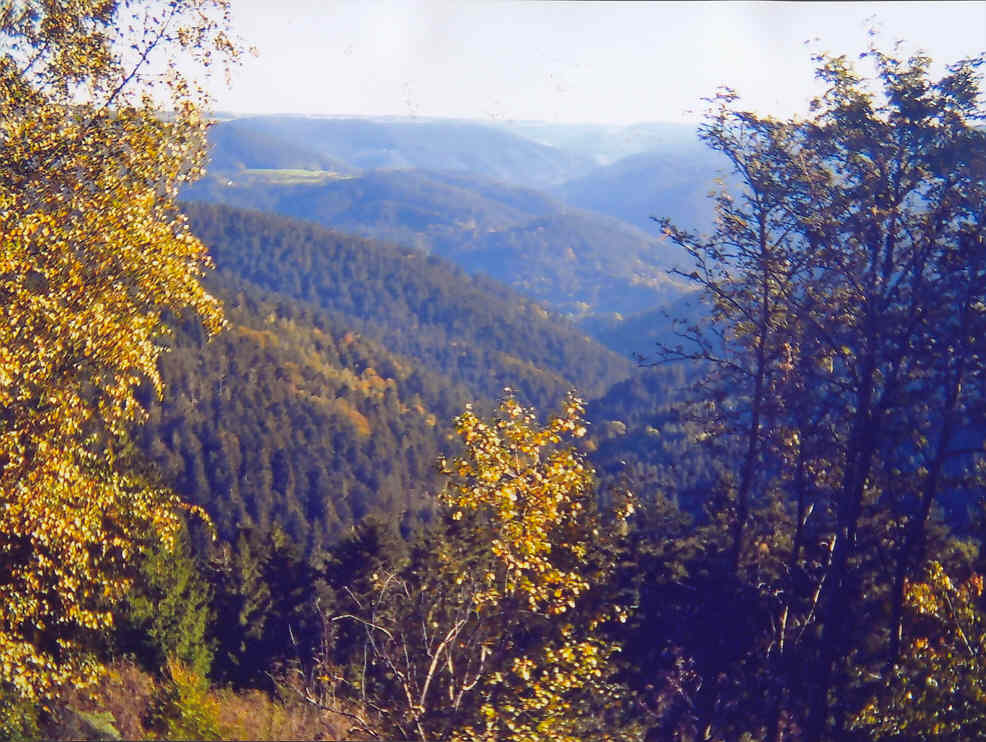
View from the Teisenkopf into the Kinzig valley

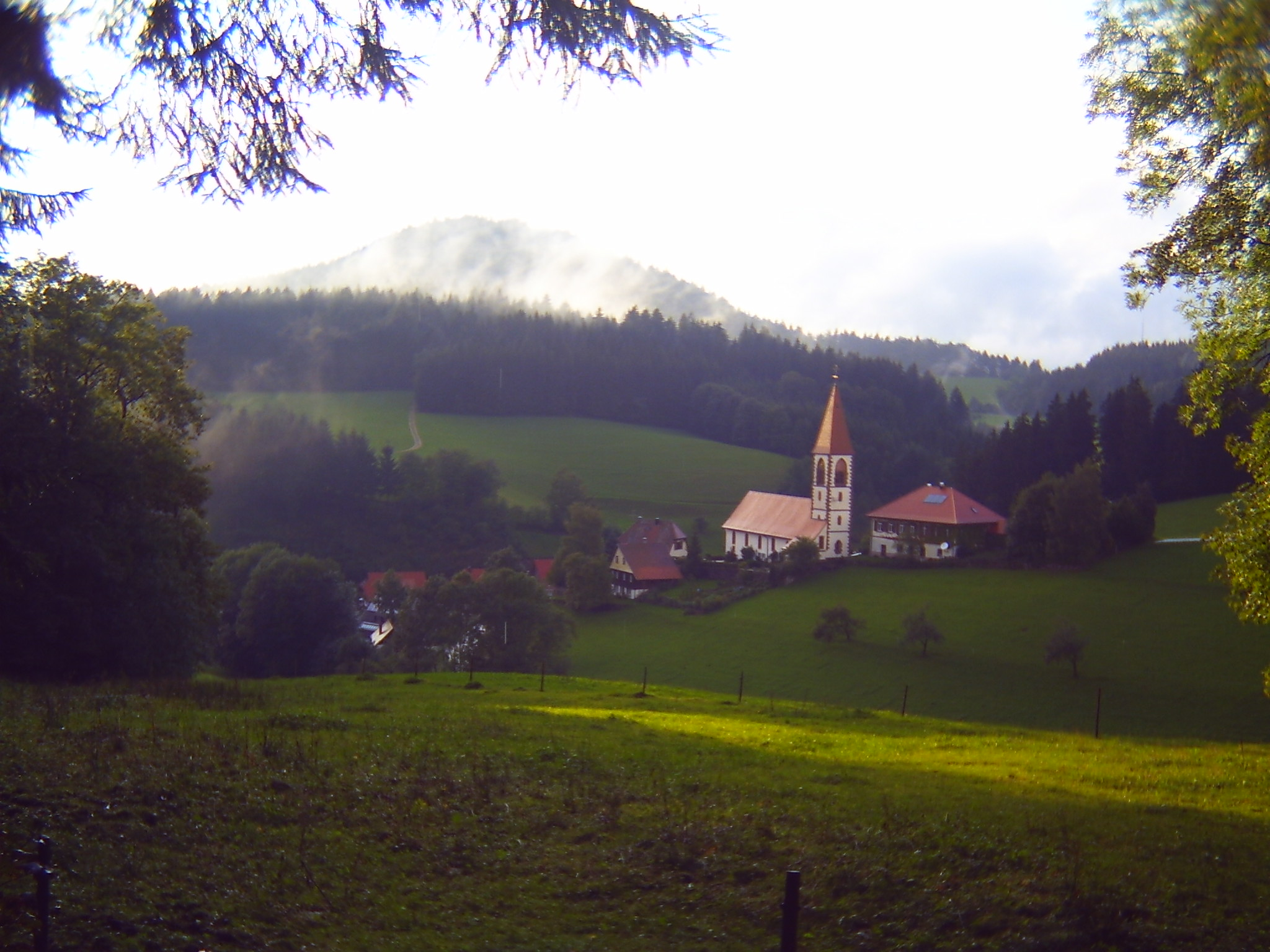
Idyllic mountain spot in St. Roman near Wolfach

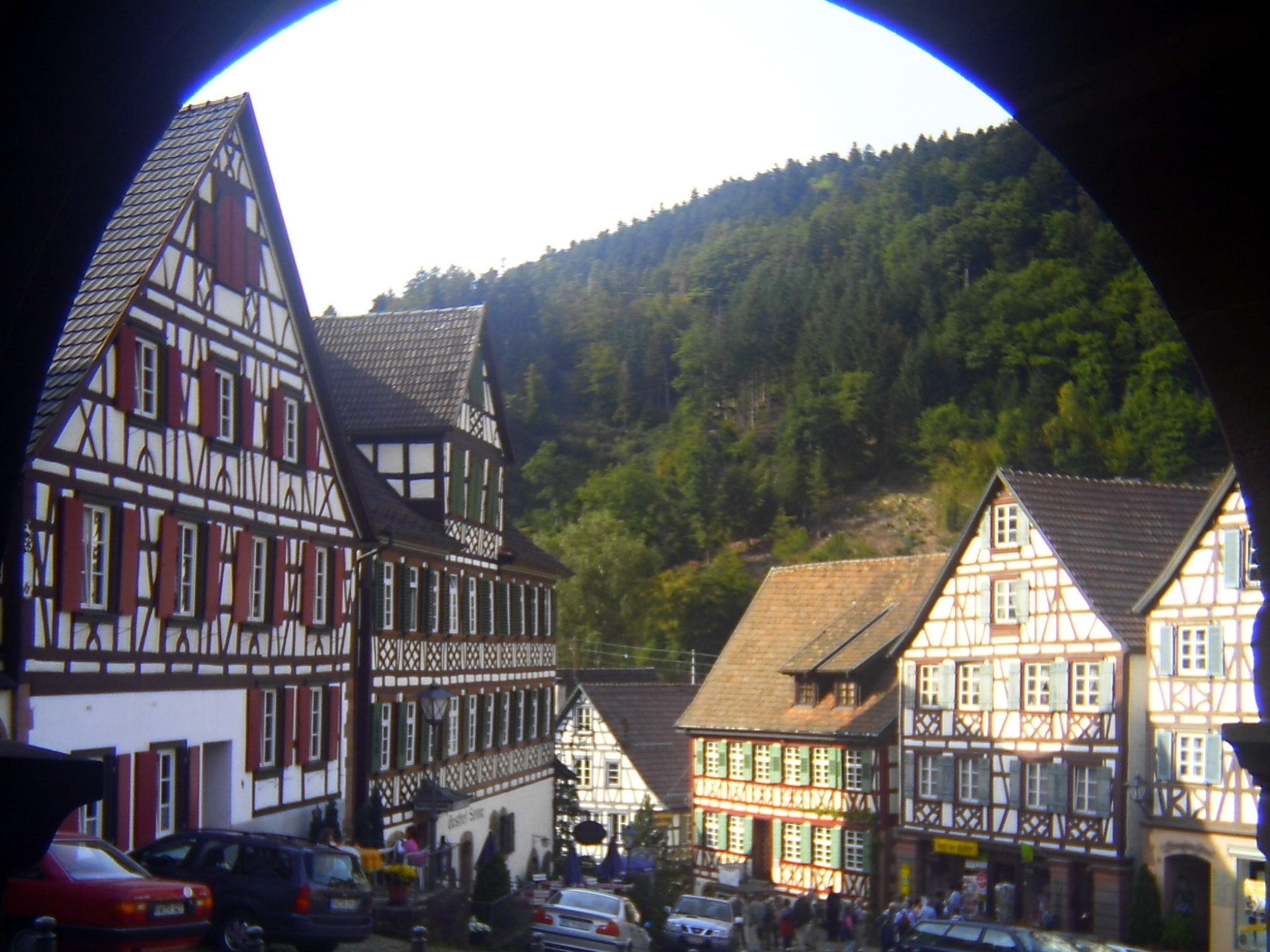
Timber framed Romanesque architecture in the little town of Schiltach

The Central/North Black Forest Nature Park is characterised by its deeply incised valleys, rock outcrops, streams, meadows and pastures. Geology and climate as well as centuries of human interference have created the Black Forest landscape which alternates between natural countryside and an agricultural cultural landscape.

Especially valuable habitats, with a large number of endangered animal and plant species, are also part of the scenery within the nature park:

- Bogs and carrs
- Tarns – the dark eyes of the Black Forest
- Grinden – open heathland on the mountain kuppen formed by centuries of grazing

The variety of habitats is partly due to the unique climate of the Black Forest. Whilst positioned in the Foothill Zone of the Eastern Alps, its proximity to other climatological regions, such as the Mediterranean and Scandinavia, affects its diversity. Visitors to highlands, such as the Hornisgrinde, for example, may experience colder temperatures in certain seasons, and warmer temperatures in others. Views of the Rhine Plain and of snow capped mountains are both accessible.

In addition, its range of hotels and restaurants alongside a host of cultural attractions make the Central/North Black Forest Nature Park one of the most popular holiday regions in Germany. World renown spas, culture and a range of sporting and tourist facilities for activities like hiking, mountain biking and winter sports add to its popularity.

== See also ==
- List of nature parks in Germany
- Southern Black Forest Nature Park
- Black Forest National Park
