= Hoher Ochsenkopf =

Mountain in Germany

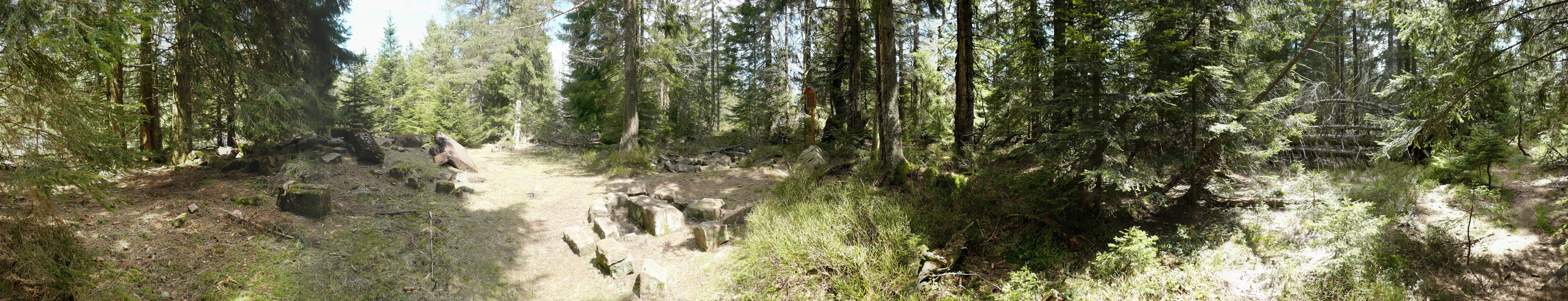
- The Bannwald and remains of the blown up viewing tower on the summit of the Hoher Ochsenkopf

Highest point
- Elevation: 1,054.5 m above sea level (NHN) (3,460 ft)
- Coordinates: 48°38′36″N 8°16′08″E

Geography
- Location within Baden-Württemberg
- Location: Baden-Württemberg, Germany
- Parent range: Black Forest

Geology
- Rock type: Bunter Sandstone

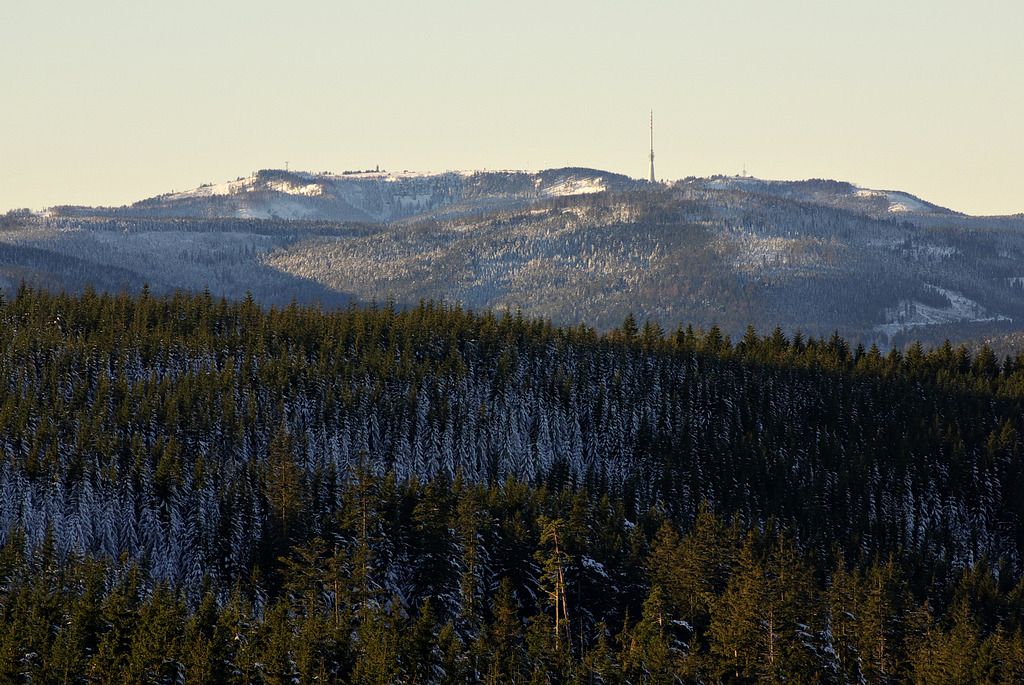
View from Hohloh of the Hornisgrinde. The Hoher Ochsenkopf is the sunlit kuppe in the right half of the picture; its summit is just below the Hornisgrinde transmission tower.

The Hoher Ochsenkopf ("High Ochsenkopf", literally "High Oxen Peak") is a mountain in the Northern Black Forest in the municipality of Forbach in south Germany. At 1,054.5 m above sea level (NHN) it is the highest point in Forbach and also in the county of Rastatt. The mountain, whose domed summit or kuppe was already a nature reserve lies in the Black Forest National Park which was founded in 2014. Its name (which means "high oxen-peak") recalls its former use as wood pasture.

== Location ==
The Hoher Ochsenkopf lies about six kilometres northeast of the highest mountain in the Northern Black Forest, the Hornisgrinde, which is 108 metres higher. Like the Badener Höhe three kilometres north it is part of an eastern spur of the main chain of the northern Black Forest, which runs between the Upper Rhine Plain and the Murg valley. This spur is bounded by two western side valleys of the Murg, the valley of the Hundsbach with the Forbach village of Hundsbach in the south and the Schwarzenbach valley with the village of Herrenwies in the north and the Schwarzenbach Dam in the northeast. The Hoher Ochsenkopf is linked to the Mittlerer Ochsenkopf ("middle oxen-peak", 1,004.9 m) to the south over the Kegelplatz, a 977-metre-high saddle. The 964-metre-high Vorderer Ochsenkopf ("anterior oxen-peak") adjoins the Mittlerer Ochsenkopf to the south and, further east, is the Nägeliskopf (994 m). In the northwest, the 948-metre-high saddle of Dreikohlplatten links the Hoher Ochsenkopf to the Mehliskopf (1008 m).

== Hoher Ochsenkopf Nature Reserve ==
The flat and once deforested domed summit or kuppe, then a typical grinde of the Northern Black Forest, was used in past centuries as pasture. The forest recolonised the area after grazing ended. In 1970 a Bannwald forest, 41.1 hectares in area, was declared around the summit and, in 1975, it was turned into a nature reserve. In 1986, in order to protect the capercaillie, a bird reserve, 600 ha in area, was declared around the Hoher Ochsenkopf. In 2000 the Bannwald was extended to an area of 100.7 ha and complemented by the surrounding, 427 ha of Schonwald, a form of semi-protected forest, called the Nägeliskopf.

Numerous rare and endangered animal and plant species have settled here, including the three-toed woodpecker, which had been extinct for many years in the Black Forest.

== Development ==
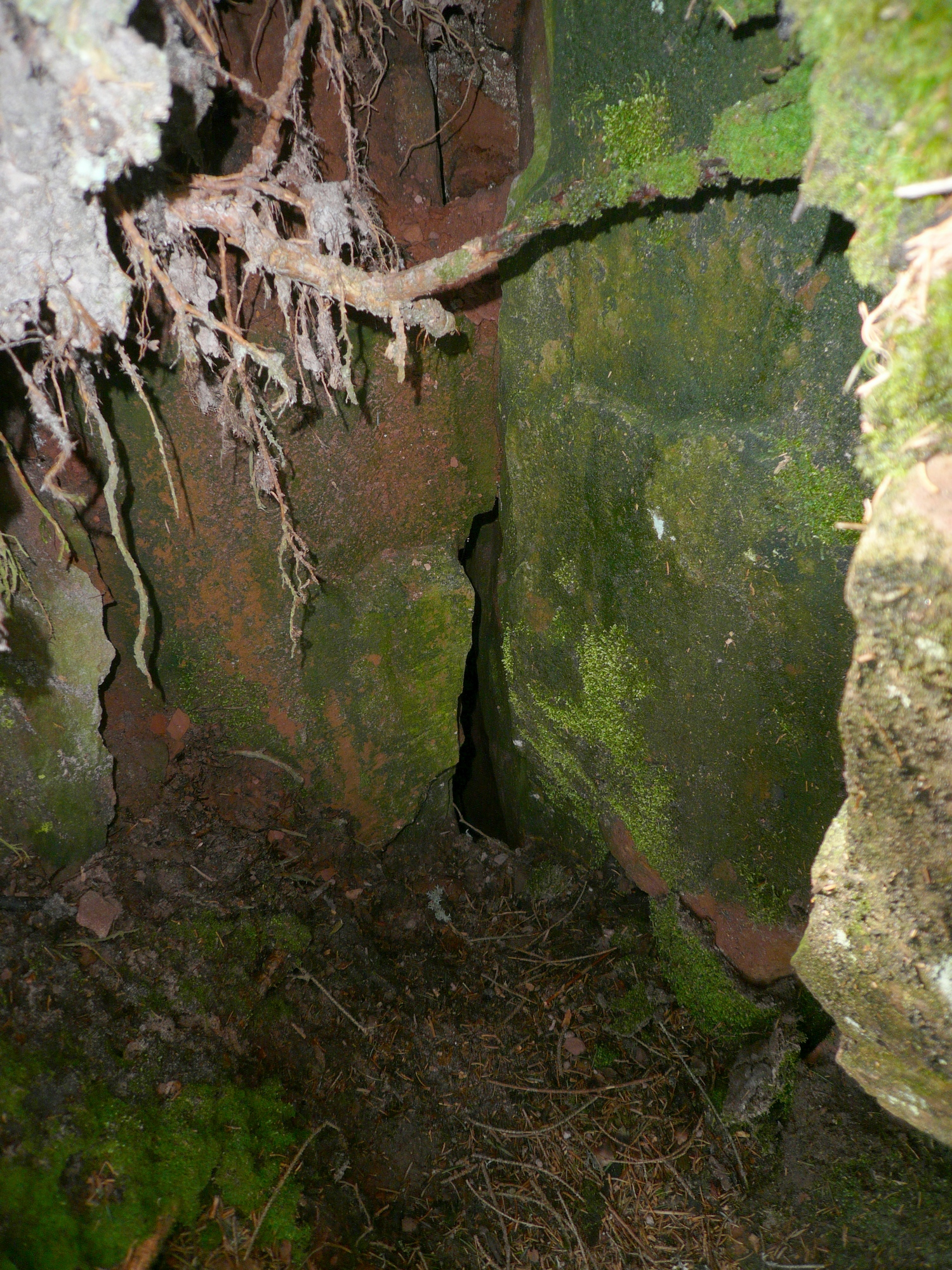
The Teufelskamin ("Devil's Chimney") on the Hoher Ochsenkopf

The Hoher Ochsenkopf is accessible on foot from Hundseck on the Black Forest High Road over a roughly three-kilometre-long ridgeway or after a steep climb from Herrenwies or Hundsbach-Aschenplatz/Bridge along the Kirchweg.

The start point is the östlichen Dreikohlplatten. From there a path marked by blue and white wooden posts leads initially gently uphill. Later it becomes unmarked and climbs steeply uphill to the point, where there used to be a seven-metre-high observation tower, built in 1902, that was replaced in 1927 by a 12-metre-high stone tower. After a lightning strike, it was blown up by the Technisches Hilfswerk in 1971. Even today the rubble pile of stone blocks is still visible. The path continues uphill towards the Teufelskamin ("Devil's Chimney"), an open fault in the Bunter sandstone that appears as a 20-metre-deep cave.

Around the Hoher Ochsenkopf runs the almost level Becker Way (Beckerweg), a circular walk re-established by the Black Forest Club branches of Hornisgrinde, Achern, Bühl and Baden-Baden in 2003. The path is named after Daniel Becker from Frankfurt, who stayed in the old Kurhaus at Hundseck more than 100 years ago and explored the region around the Hoher Ochsenkopf.

== Literature ==
- Andreas Wolf: Hoher Ochsenkopf. In: Bezirksstelle für Naturschutz und Landschaftspflege Karlsruhe (Hrsg.): Die Naturschutzgebiete im Regierungsbezirk Karlsruhe. Jan Thorbecke Verlag, Stuttgart, 2000, ISBN 3-7995-5172-7
