= Black Forest National Park =

National Park in Baden-Württemberg, Germany

- Nationalpark Schwarzwald
- IUCN category II (national park)
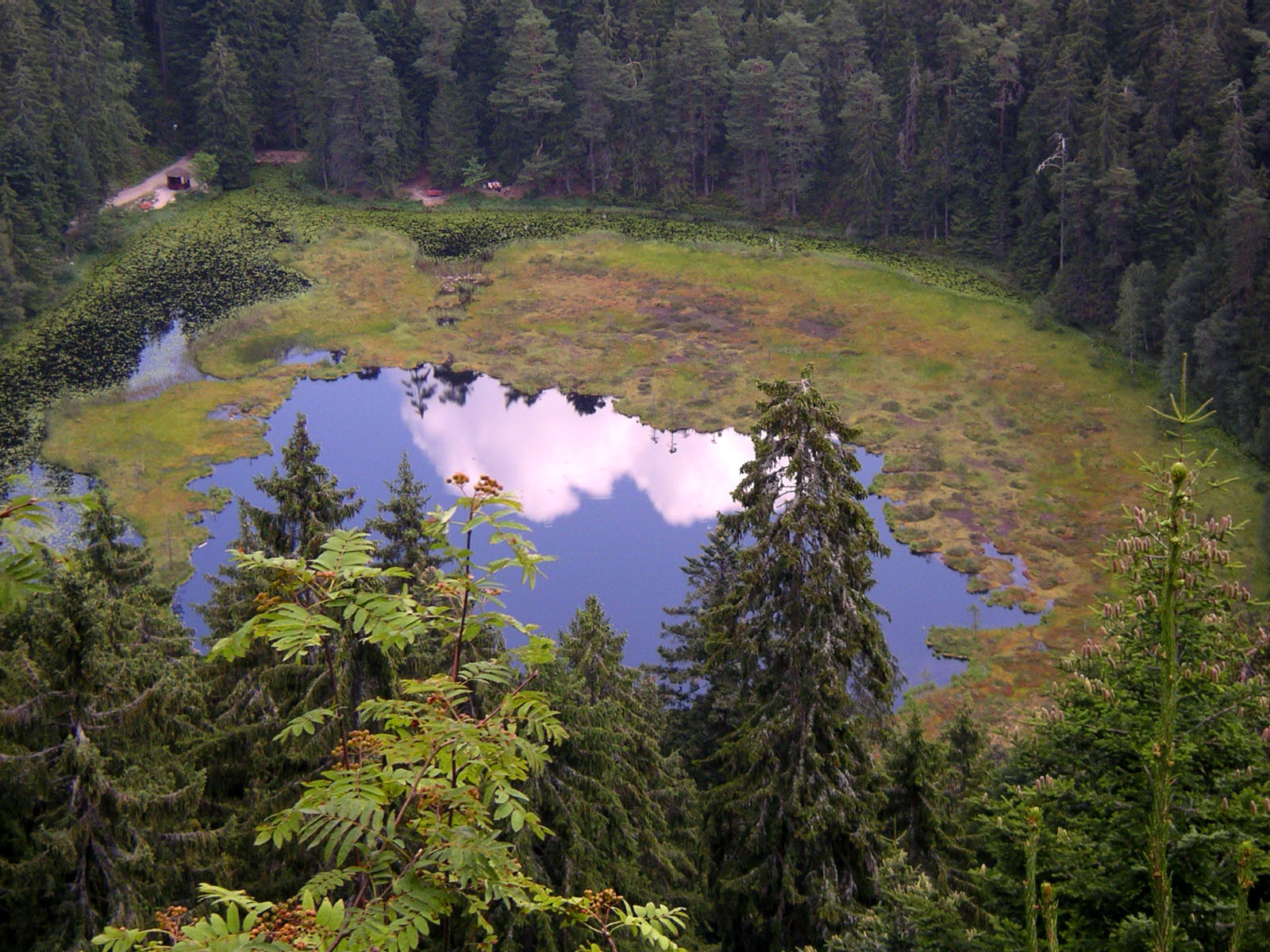
- The Huzenbacher See, one of several tarns in the national park

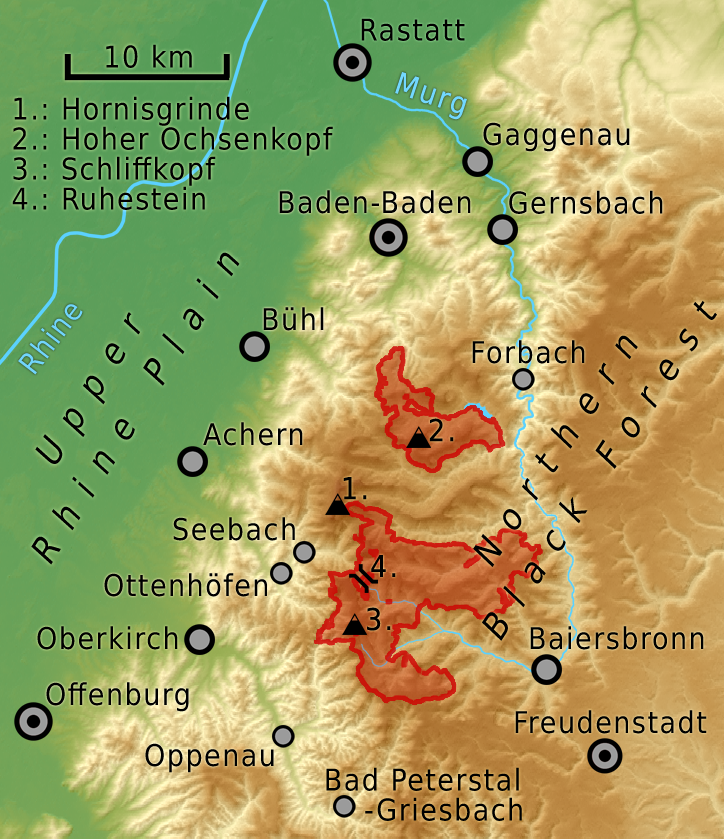
- Location of the Black Forest National Park in the northwestern Black Forest
- Location: Baden-Württemberg, Germany
- Nearest city: Baden-Baden, Freudenstadt
- Coordinates: 48°33′40″N 8°13′17″E
- Area: 10,062 ha (24,860 acres)
- Established: 1 January 2014
- Website: www.nationalpark-schwarzwald.de
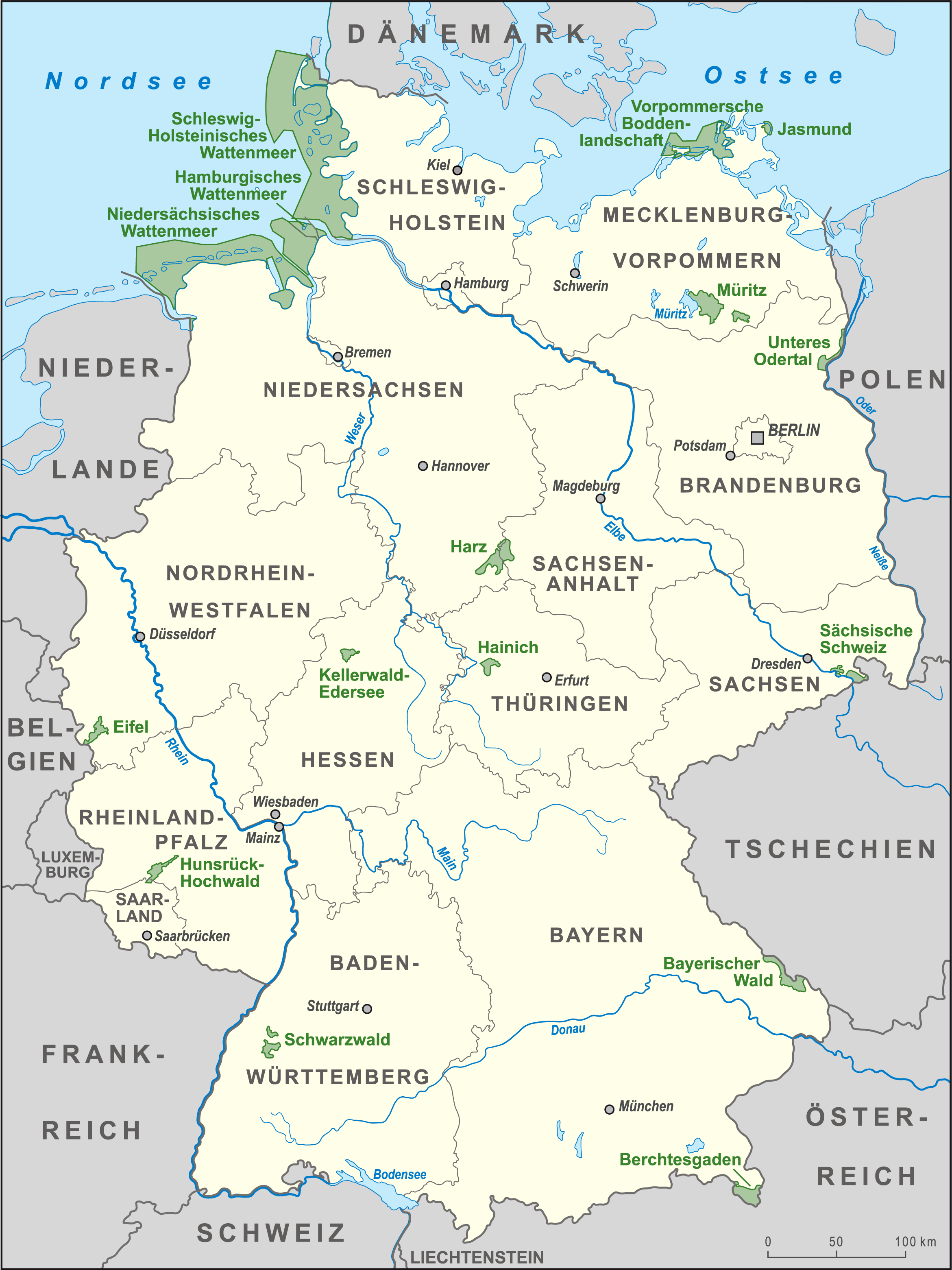
- Black Forest National Park in the southwest of the map

The Black Forest National Park (German: Nationalpark Schwarzwald) is a national park in the state of Baden-Württemberg in the southwest of Germany.

It has an area of 10,062 hectares (100.62 km^{2}; 38.85 sq mi) and is located on the main crest of the Northern Black Forest, mainly between the Black Forest High Road (Schwarzwaldhochstraße) and the valley of the Murg. It comprises two separate areas, roughly 3.5 kilometres apart, around Ruhestein (7,615 ha) and Hoher Ochsenkopf/Plättig (2,447 ha) and is part of the Central/North Black Forest Nature Park (Naturpark Schwarzwald Mitte/Nord). The park was officially opened on 3 May 2014

== History ==
The Black Forest National Park was created on 1 January 2014 and is the first national park in Baden-Württemberg, Germany. The state parliament voted for its establishment on 28 November 2013.

The establishment of the first national park in the Black Forest was politically controversial. In 2013, it was opposed by Baden-Württemberg's opposition parties (CDU and FDP), by representatives of the timber industry and by some of the affected population, whilst being supported by the SPD and Greens, the conservation associations and other parts of the populations of the Northern Black Forest. It is the first and only national park in Baden-Württemberg.

In 2021 the minister for environment Thekla Walker (A90/The Greens) announced plans to extend the national park and eventually connect the two parts in the following years.

== Location and extent ==
The northern part of the area, the High Ochsenkopf / Plättig includes the upper Schwarzenbach valley and the regions around the High Ochsenkopf (1,055 m above sea level (NHN)) in the centre, the Mehliskopf (1,008 m) in the west, the Badener Höhe (1,003 m) in the north and the Nägeliskopf (994 m) in the east. The lowest and most easterly point of this park is at the confluence of the Schwarzbach and Raumünzach streams, at a height of just below 500 m. Excluded are the village of Herrenwies as well as smaller areas around Plättig, Sand and the youth hostel of Badener Höhe. In the northeast, it borders to the Schwarzenbach Reservoir, and in the west to the Bühlerhöhe beyond the Black Forest High Road. Most of the state forest here belongs to the municipality of Forbach (in the county of Rastatt). The towns of Bühl (Rastatt) and Baden-Baden own other municipal forests in the area around Plättig.

The greater part of the Ruhestein area extends reaches a height of approximately 1,150 m above NHN near Dreifürstenstein in the southeasternmost summit region of the Hornisgrinde, the highest mountain in the northern Black Forest. Other summits are the bird's head (Vogelskopf) (1,056 m) and the Schliffkopf (1,054 m) to the west, the Seekopf (1,054 m) in the northwest, the Riesenköpfle (1,001 m) in the centre, the Leinkopf (992 m) in the north and the Großhahnberg (940 m) in the northeast. In this southern part of the National Park are the tarns of Wildsee, Huzenbacher See and Buhlbachsee and the upper Schönmünz valley and the headwaters of the Murg headstreams, the Rechtmurg and Rotmurg and other Murg tributaries. On the western slopes of the Schliffkopf this subregions extends down as far as the All Saints Waterfalls, where it reaches is lowest and most westerly point at a height of approximately 500 m. Excluded from the Ruhestein area are the Ruhestein itself with its two ski slopes and the Great Ruhestein Ski Jump, the Darmstädter Hut, the Schliffkopf Hotel, the Rotmurg Hunting Lodge, the hamlet of Schonmünz (Volzenhäuser) and other small areas. The state forest land here belongs mainly to the collective municipality of Baiersbronn (in the county of Freudenstadt), other elements belong to Oppenau, Ottenhöfen and Seebach (in the county of Ortenaukreis).

The park covers an area of 10,062 hectares, of which 2,447 hectares are within the High Ochsenkopf/Plättig and 7,615 hectares around the Ruhestein. The two areas are separated by the Forbach parish of Hundsbach.

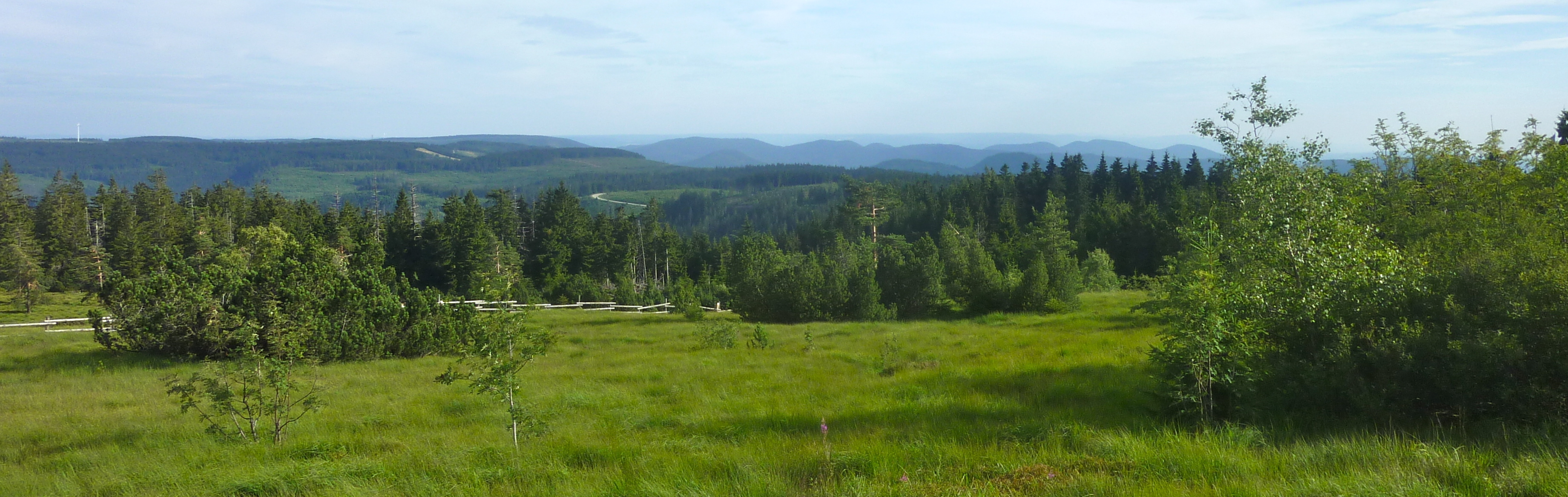
Grinde terrain on the Schliffkopf. View over the southern part of the Ruhestein sub-region and the Black Forest High Road looking towards the Central Black Forest
