= Huzenbacher See =

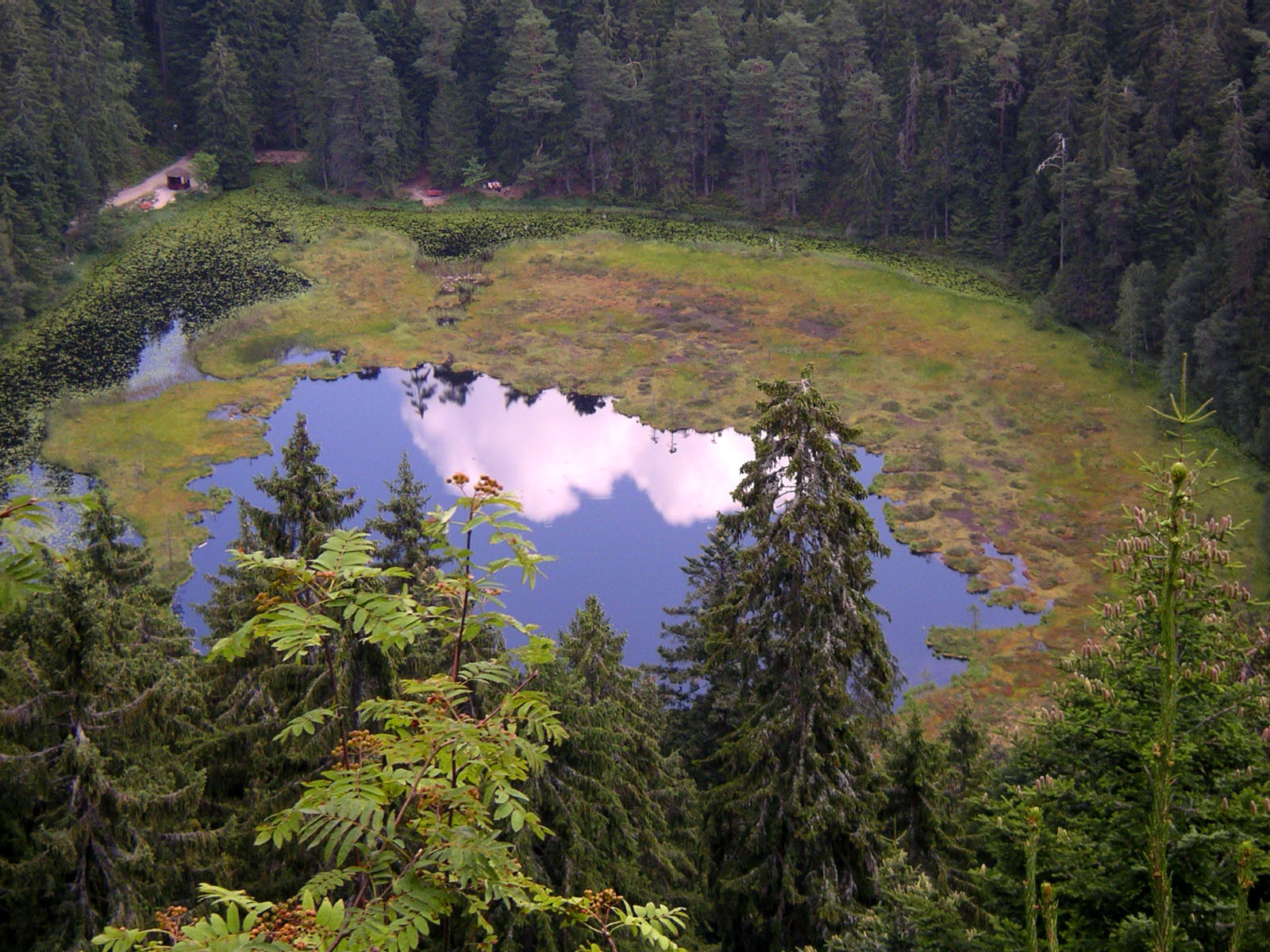
- View of the tarn from the headwall of the cirque

- Location within Baden-Württemberg
- Location: Baden-Württemberg
- Coordinates: 48.574641°N 08.348687°E
- Primary outflows: Seebach → Murg
- Max. length: 0.25 km (0.16 mi)
- Max. width: 0.145 km (0.090 mi)
- Surface area: 2.7 ha (6.7 acres)
- Max. depth: 7.5 m (25 ft)
- Surface elevation: 747 m (2,451 ft)

The Huzenbacher See ("Lake Huzenbach") is a tarn in the Northern Black Forest in southwestern Germany. It lies within the municipal territory of Baiersbronn around seven kilometres north of the village itself at a height of 747 metres in the Black Forest National Park. It is steeped in legend and is also known today for its yellow water lilies, the flowers of which may be seen from mid to late July.

The tarn was formed about 25,000 to 30,000 years ago. From the 18th century it was used as Schwallwasser i.e. for the floating of logs downstream as part of the timber rafting industry. In 1895 a weir was built at the outflow of the tarn in order to be able to regulate the water level better. This raised the lake by about 2 metres and gave it a depth of 7 to 8 metres. By raising the water level the surface of the land by the shore was loosened and floated up. Part of the lake is still covered by e web of moss, roots and young trees today. A similar phenomenon has occurred at the tarns of Nonnenmattweiher and the Kleiner Arbersee.

In the night of 1 July 2012 a storm caused severe damage in the forest district of Baiersbronn; the wood on the eastern shore of the Huzenbacher See being destroyed.
