= Schliffkopf =

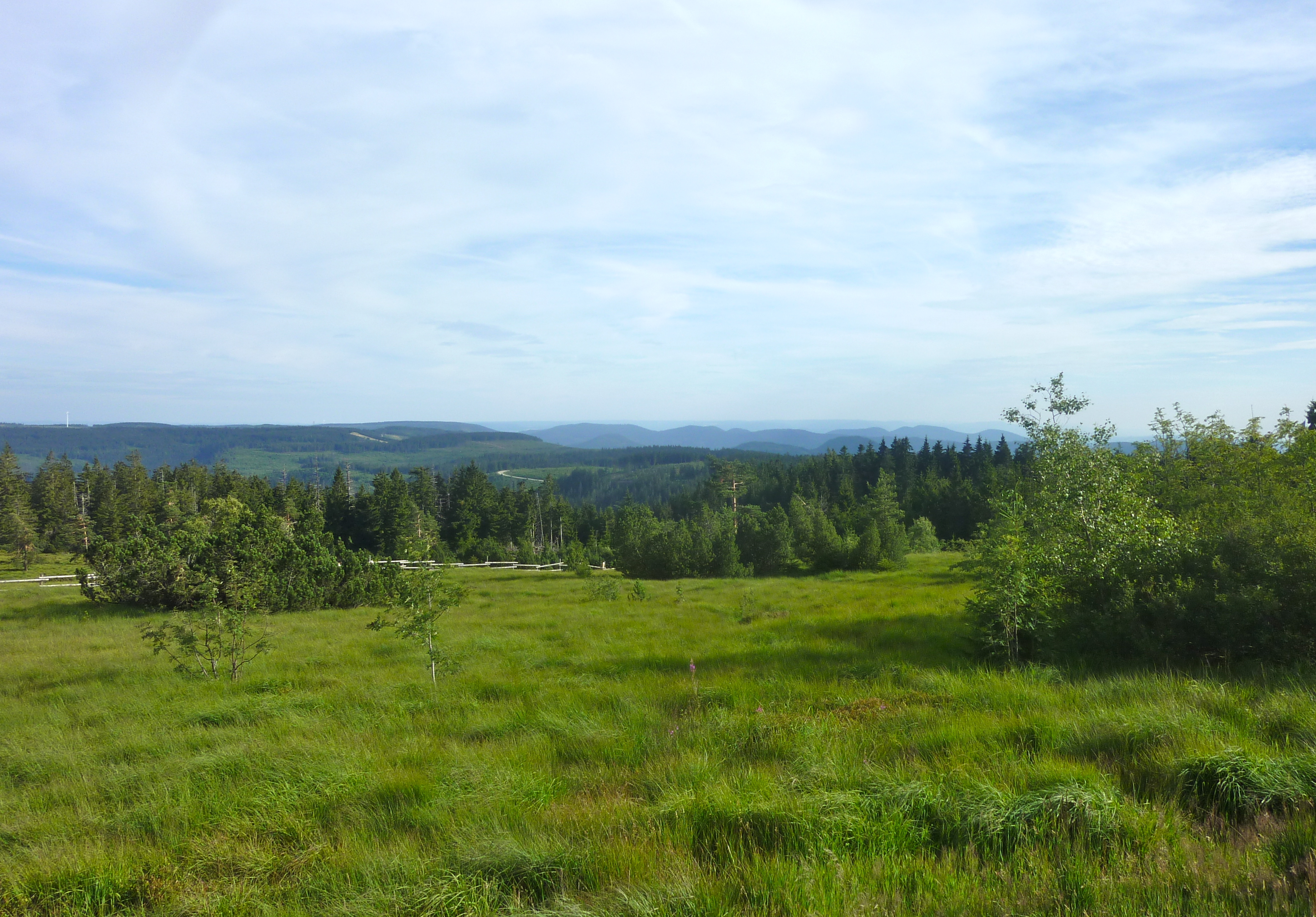
- View from the Schliffkopf looking south

Highest point
- Elevation: 1,054 m above sea level (NHN) (3,458 ft)
- Coordinates: 48°32′07″N 8°12′55″E

Geography
- Location within Baden-Württemberg
- Location: Baden-Württemberg, Germany
- Parent range: Northern Black Forest

The Schliffkopf is a mountain in the Northern Black Forest between Baiersbronn, Ottenhöfen and Oppenau. It is 1,053.6 m above sea level (NHN). The Schliffkopf lies on the Black Forest High Road in the National Park and is the site of an eponymous four-star "wellness" hotel. Various long-distance paths, including the West Way, run over the Schliffkopf.

At the end of June 2003 a nature trail, the Lothar Path (Lotharpfad), was opened at the Schliffkopf on the topic of storm damage. Along an 800-metre-long educational and experience trail, visitors can see how this ten-hectare area, heavily damaged by Hurricane Lothar in 1999, has gradually recovered and been recolonized. The Lothar Path runs along footbridges, ladders and steps and shows how the forces of nature act, how nature deals with destruction in such an area and what naturally regrows.

The Schliffkopf is a source region for the Acher and the Murg.

== Nature reserves ==
A 520.1-hectare part of the raised bog-like summit region has been designated as a nature reserve since 1938. In 1986, on the territory of the district of Freudenstadt, a further 876.2 ha was granted reserve status. This is intended to protect the typical landscape of the Black Forest grinden with their extensive woods, stands of mountain pine and the tarn of Buhlbachsee. Parts of the forest are also designated as Schonwald.

The Schliffkopf is also part of the 2,897-hectare Special Area of Conservation known as the Wilder See-Hornisgrinde. In addition, the 36,045-hectare bird reserve of Nordschwarzwald includes the Schliffkopf and thus covers the SAC and nature reserves too.
