= Buhlbachsee =

Lake in Germany

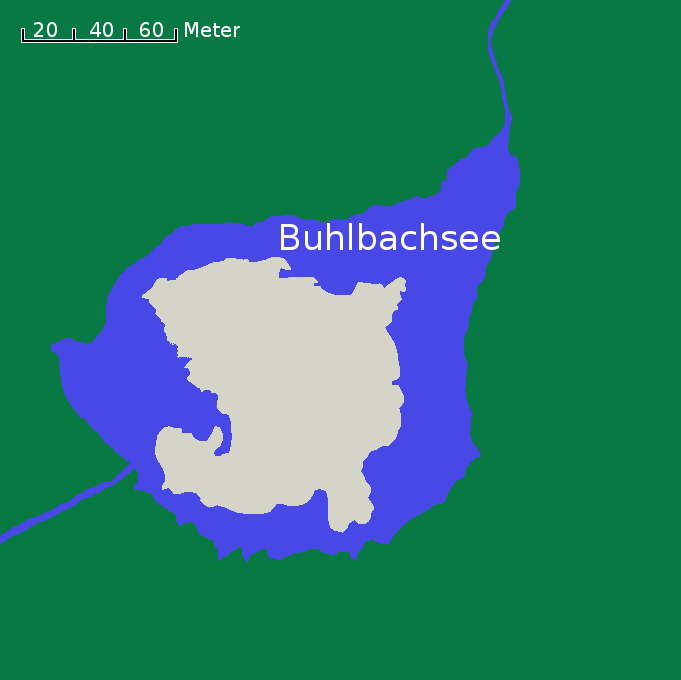

- Location within Germany
- Location: Black Forest National Park, Baden-Württemberg, Germany
- Coordinates: 48°30′03″N 8°14′41″E
- Primary outflows: Buhlbach → Rechtmurg → Rhine → North Sea
- Max. length: 0.20 km (0.12 mi)
- Max. width: 0.16 km (0.099 mi)
- Surface area: 1.2616 ha (3.117 acres)
- Surface elevation: 785 m (2,575 ft)
- Islands: An area of about 0.7 ha

The Buhlbachsee is a tarn (lake) in the northern Black Forest on the southwestern edge of the parish of Baiersbronn in the county of Freudenstadt in Baden-Württemberg. Since 1 January 2014 it has been part of the Black Forest National Park.

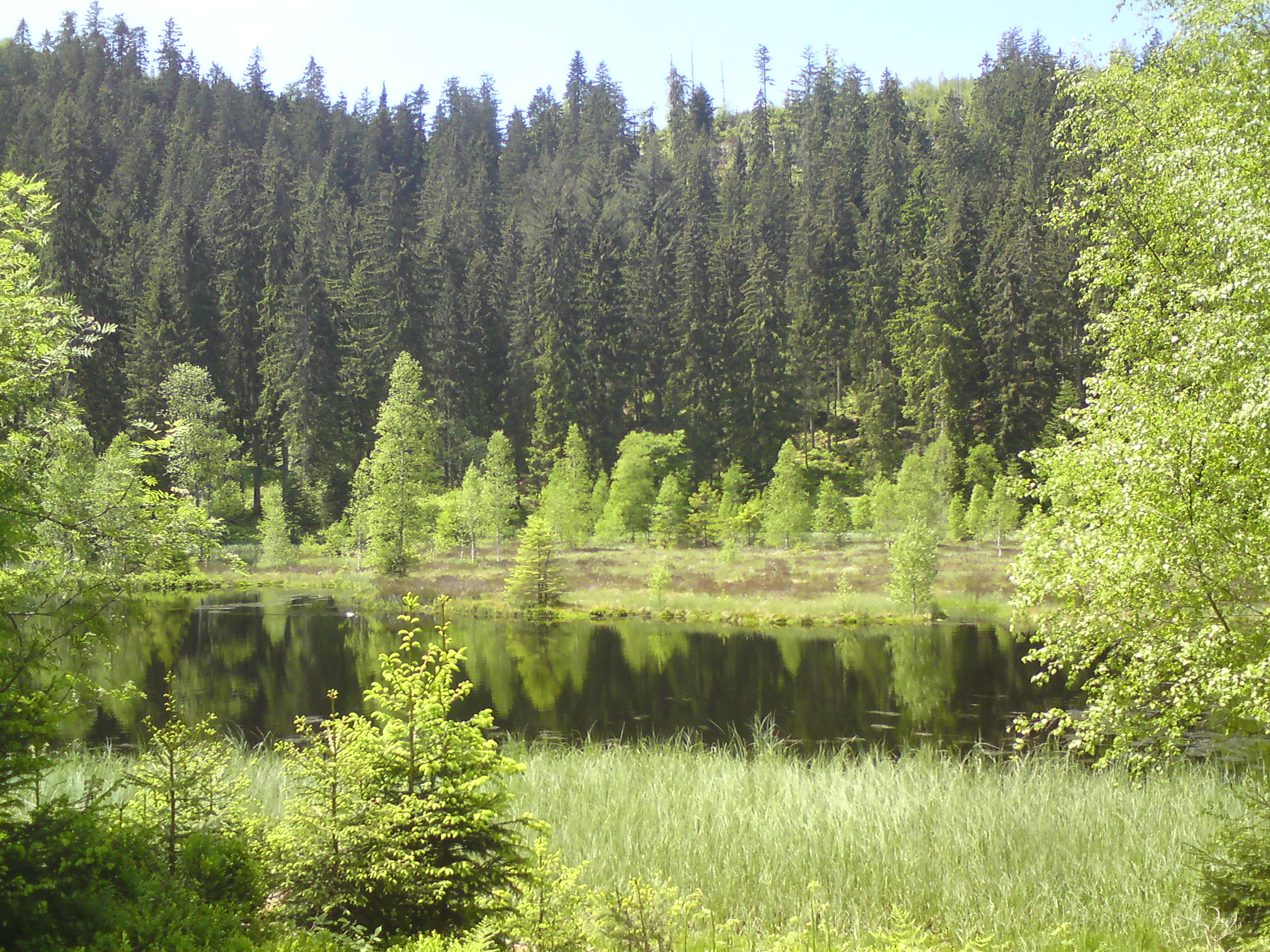
Buhlbachsee

The tarn lies around 4.5 kilometres southeast of the summit of the Schliffkopf in the Buhlbach valley and less than half a kilometre northeast of the Black Forest High Road. The lake can be reached on foot over various paths including from Kniebis, Baiersbronn-Obertal or from the Black Forest High Road.

The tarn is about 160 metres wide and almost circular in shape. Only in the northeast, where the Buhlbach stream, which enters from the southwest, leaves the lake again is there a "nose" that gives it a length of about 200 metres. There is an island in the lake, about 0.7 hectares in area, which is covered in birch trees.

Like all tarns the Buhlbachsee was formed by a glacier. After the last ice age, which ended in the Black Forest about 10,000 years ago, it was left behind.
