= Nonnenmattweiher =

Nature reserve in Baden-Württemberg, Germany

Nonnenmattweiher Nature Reserve
- IUCN category IV (habitat/species management area)
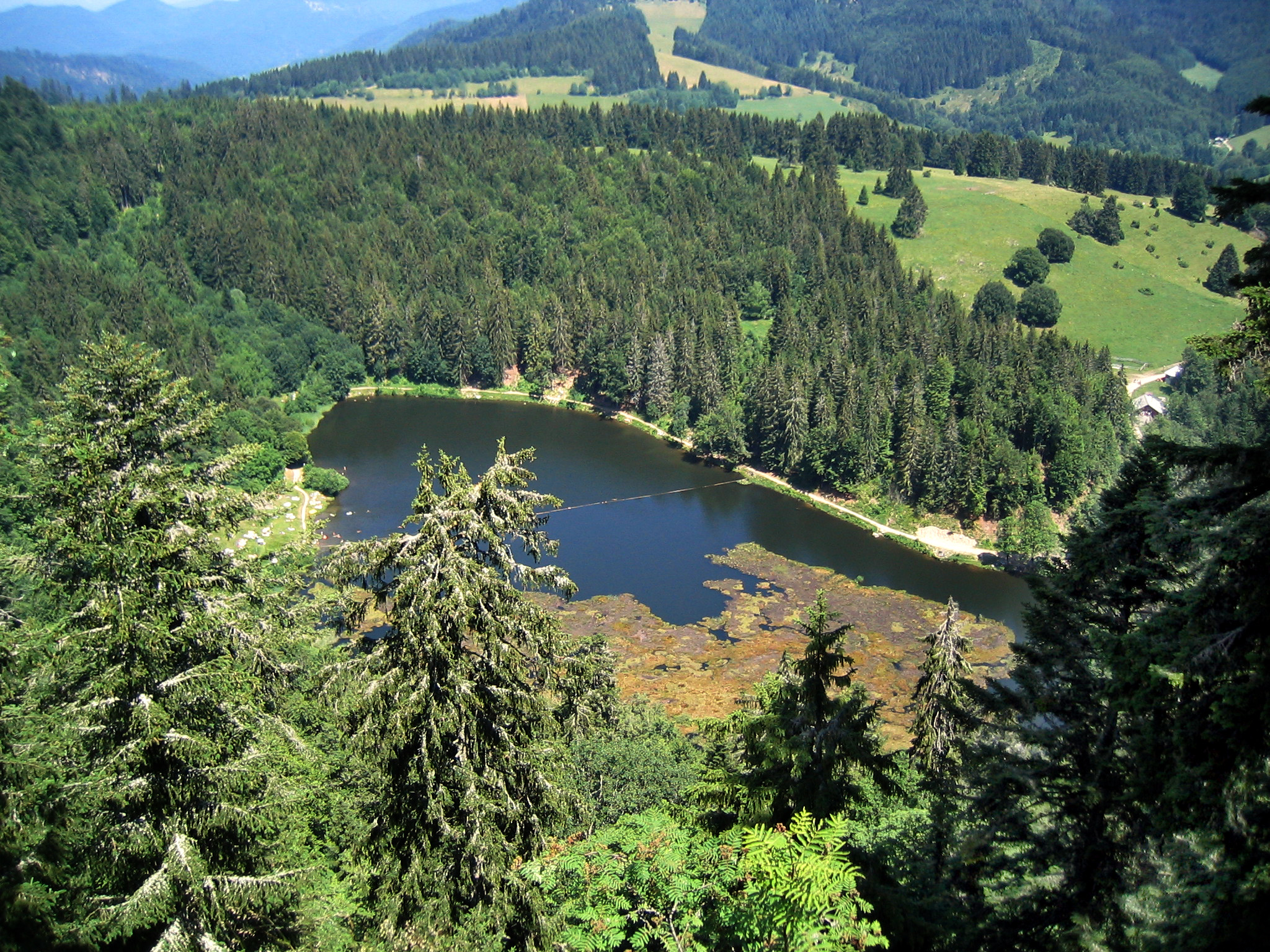
- View of the Nonnenmattweiher
- Interactive map of Nonnenmattweiher Nature Reserve
- Location: Kleines Wiesental, Lörrach, Baden-Württemberg, Germany
- Coordinates: 47°47′41″N 7°47′57″E
- Area: 0.708 km^{2} (0.273 sq mi)
- Elevation: 910–1,070 m (2,990–3,510 ft)
- Established: 31 July 1987
- Administrator: Regierungspräsidium Freiburg
- WDPA: 164836

The Nonnenmattweiher is a lake that has been impounded by an embankment in the Southern Black Forest in Germany. Together with the surrounding area it forms a nature reserve of the same name in the High Black Forest in the state of Baden-Württemberg.

== Name ==
The name of the lake goes back to the formerly common word for the mast intended as feed for cattle – the so-called Nonnen or Nunnen. It used to be pastured on the meadows in the bottom of the cirque. Later people presumed that the name came from a nunnery (Nonnenkloster) which, according to legend, sank into the lake as a result of God’s judgement.

== Geography ==
The pond and the nature reserve lie near Heubronn, a village in the parish of Neuenweg (in the municipality of Kleines Wiesental), in the Southern Black Forest in Baden-Württemberg. Other nearby villages are Badenweiler and Münstertal. The lake lies on the eastern slopes of the Köhlgarten massif at about 915 m above sea level (NHN) and is almost 325 metres long, 200 metres wide and up to 7 metres deep. (3.7 ha) The lake – excluding the large island in the south – has an area of 3.1 ha and is crossed by the Weiherbach which rises on the Heubronner Hang to the west and heads east, draining via the (Heubronner) Klemmbach, the Belchenwiese and the Kleine Wiese into the Wiese.

== Development history ==
The Nonnenmattweiher was originally formed as a cirque lake by a glacier during the ice age, but silted up in the Middle Ages and became part of an area of raised bog and boggy pasture. It was impounded as a millpond for mills further down the valley in 1758, but was intended to support the breeding of trout and carp. But when the lake was dammed, the flooded bog tore away and floated (as a result of the formation of pockets of gas due to fermentation processes in the bog structure), and fish breeding was impractical. On 1 March 1922 the rain-sodden bank could no longer resist the water pressure and the burst, destroying the riverbanks as far as the valley of the Little Wiese. The lake basin dried out until the reconstruction of the embankment in the early 1930s. In early June 1934 the inauguration of the new reservoir which was 2 metres higher than before. The bog floated up to the surface again and covered an even greater area than before. It still forms a floating island of peat, like that of the Huzenbacher See in the Northern Black Forest and the Kleiner Arbersee in the Bohemian Forest.

In 2004 the area hit the headlines when a number of environmentalists complained that tree felling had significantly changed the character of the cirque. In 2007 more tree felling and other incursions of the nature reserve took place.

== Protected areas ==
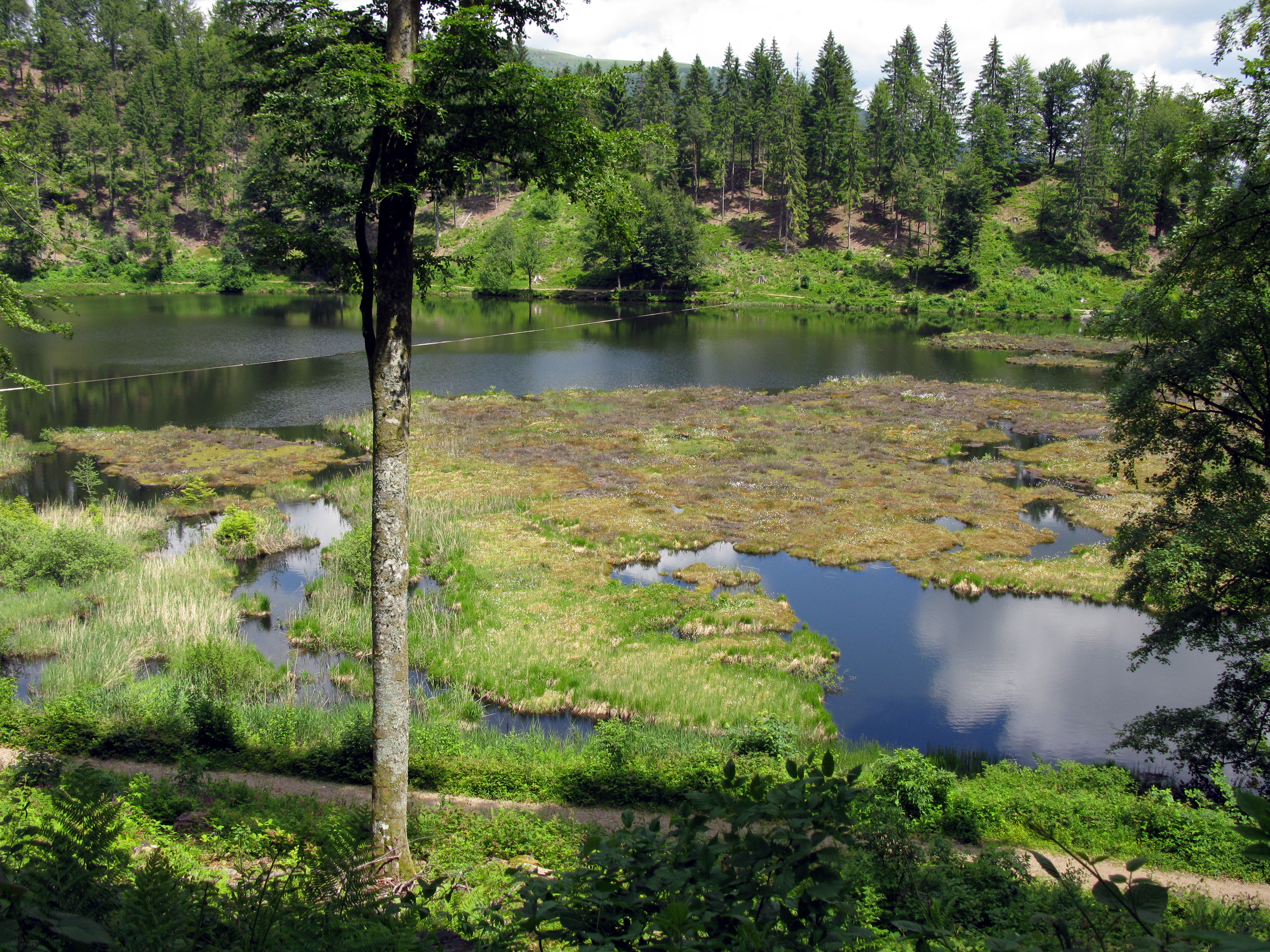
Peat island on the Nonnenmattweiher

=== Nature reserve ===
By order of the Regierungspräsidium Freiburg dated 31 July 1987 the Nonnenmattweiher was declared a nature reserve (Protected Area Number 3.161) with an area of 70.8 hectares. It is classed as IUCN Category IV. The CDDA Code is 164836 and corresponds with the WDPA ID.

The conservation aim is to preserve the region's with its high rock faces, and the Nonnenmattweiher, a tarn with moraine banks in front of it, as a habitat for rare and endangered animal and plant species.

=== Protected areas ===
The Nonnenmattweiher had been declared a protected area as early as 20 January 1941. After designating the nature reserve, a small area of around 2.8 hectares is still a protected area.

== Vegetation ==
Around and in the lake are numerous rare plants. One rarity is the floating peat island that has fen and transitional bog vegetation. The island is out of bounds.

About half the lake is bordered by a barrier of floating logs enabling the rest to be used as a bathing lake.

== See also ==
- List of lakes of Germany
- Nature reserves in Germany

== Literature ==
- Referat Naturschutz und Landschaftspflege (11 August 2011). Regierungspräsidium Freiburg (ed.). Naturschutzgebiete im Regierungsbezirk Freiburg [Nature reserves in the administrative district of Freiburg] (in German) (3rd ed.). Ostfildern: Thorbecke. ISBN 978-3-7995-5177-9.
- Geographisch-kartographisches Institut Meyer (1989): Südschwarzwald (Meyers Naturführer). Meyers Lexikonverlag, Mannheim, ISBN 3-411-02775-4
- Kurt Ückert: Der Nonnenmattweiher - zur Geschichte eines kleinen Sees, Schopfheim 1989.
- Alfred Drexlin: Der Nonnenmattweiher bei Heubronn. In: Der Schwarzwald, Band 1978, S. 152-153
