= Kuppe =

Hilltop

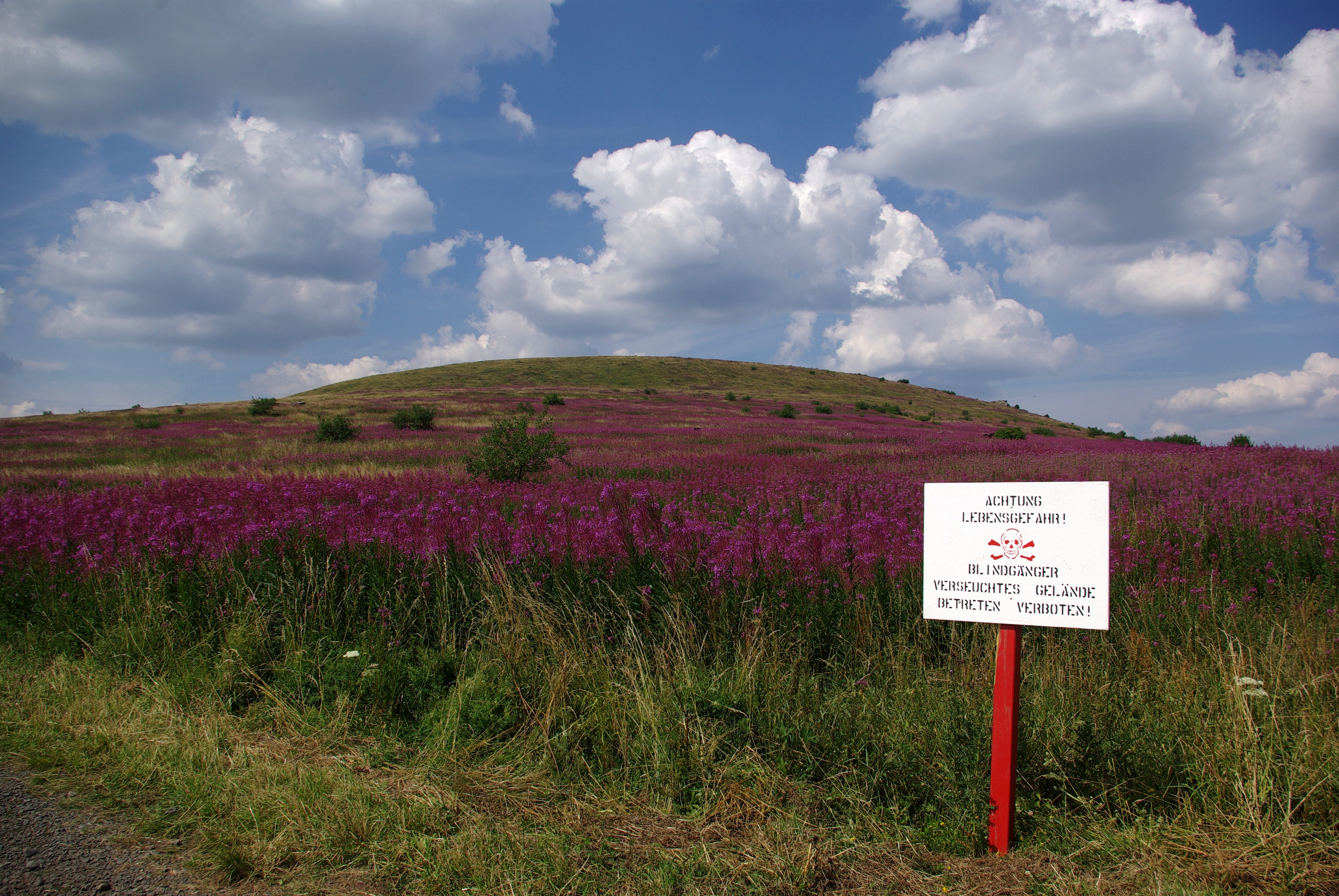
The Dammersfeldkuppe, a kuppe or domed hill in the Rhön

A kuppe is the term used in German-speaking central Europe for a mountain or hill with a rounded summit that has no rock formation, such as a tor, on it. A range of such hills is called a kuppengebirge. In geology the term also refers to corresponding stratigraphic forms. The term is similar to the English topographical and geological terms, knoll and dome. It is also analogous to the French word ballon which means a mountain with a rounded summit.

In cartography in German-speaking countries, the term is used more widely to refer to all eminences (biaxially convex landforms) i.e. including those with a more pointed appearance.

Kuppen are a common feature of many ranges within the German Central Uplands including the Rhön Mountains.

== Derivation ==
Kuppe comes from the Middle High German language of the 18th century, probably deriving from the Late Latin/Common Roman word cuppa = "beaker", which then became commonly used in the sense of haube ("helmet" or "covering") for a summit.

== Geomorphology and geology ==
Kuppengebirge ("kuppe hills") is a geomorphological term. Their formation usually arises as a combination of certain types of rock and the onset of steady erosion processes.

== Distribution ==
Kuppen are typical of the Central Uplands and the Prealps of Europe. For example, the many domed summits of the Fichtel Mountains or the Pohorje are called kuppen, but they also occur in hilly areas. In this connexion, for example, a part of the Rhön Mountains is known as the Kuppen Rhön (Kuppenrhön), and kuppe or koppe is often part of the name of mountains and hills—e.g. the Wasserkuppe and the Schneekoppe.

Places where sedimentary beds have bulged and where rising oil or natural gas has accumulated, are also called kuppen.
