= Grinde (landform) =

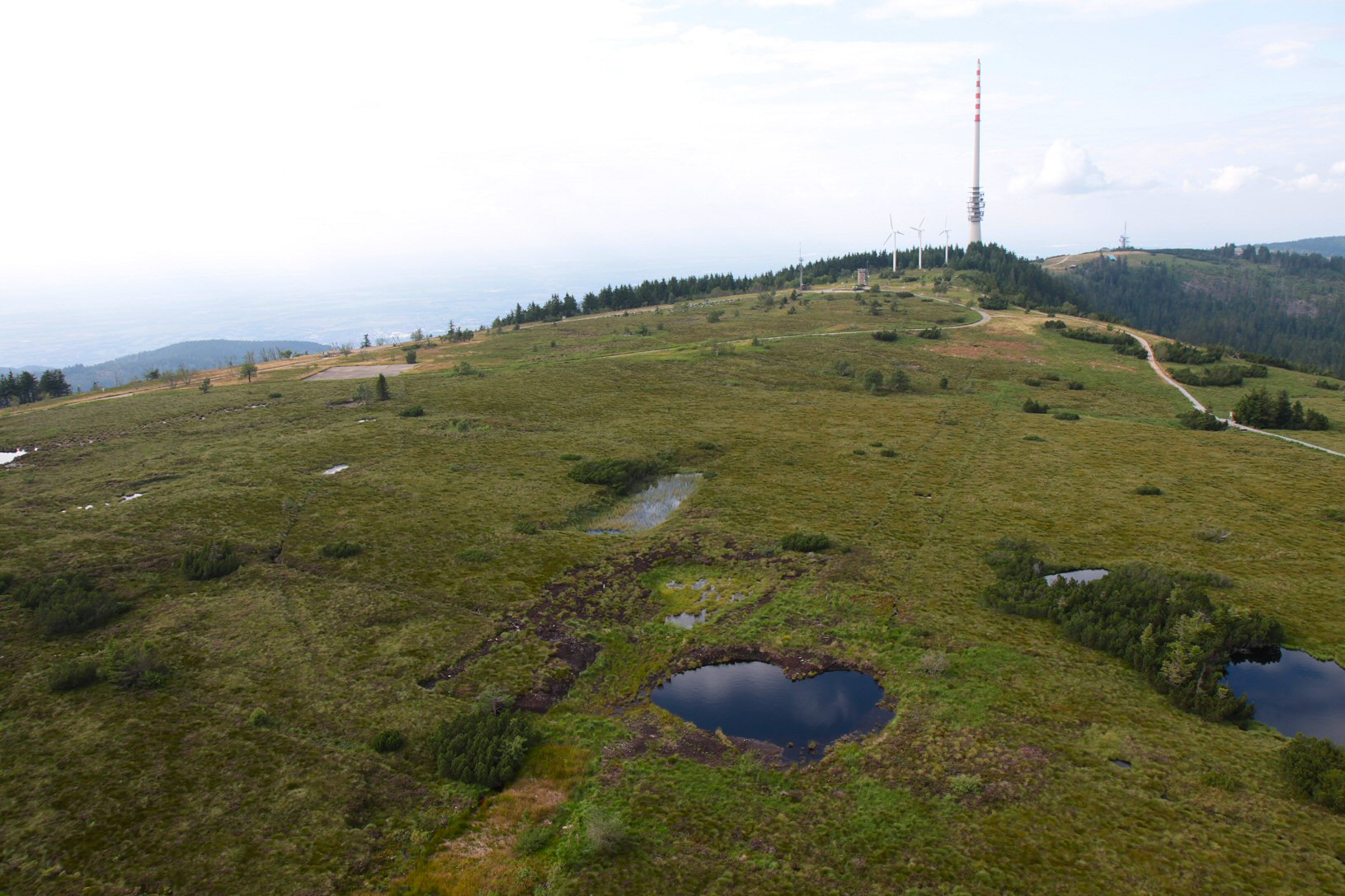
Summit plateau of the Hornisgrinde

A grinde (plural: grinden) is an almost treeless area of wet heathland found on the rounded bunter sandstone ridges of the Northern Black Forest in Germany. The grinden reached their greatest extent in the early 19th century when they ran from the Kniebis mountain near Freudenstadt in the south to the heights near Dobel in the north. Today they are restricted to the highest parts of the Northern Black Forest around the summits of the Hornisgrinde, Schliffkopf and Kniebis (900 to 1,163 m above sea level (NHN)). They still cover an area of about 180 ha. Conservation measures and careful grazing by robust breeds of cattle (especially the Hinterwald), goats and sheep should enable the remaining grinden to be preserved for their great ecological value and as an important feature of the landscape. Most of them are under conservation orders.

== Derivation and meaning of the word ==
The German term "Grinde" comes from Old High German and is related to the Swabian-Alemannic word "Grind", which means something like "bald head". This term was used to refer to the treeless summits of the region.

== Emergence and usage ==
The grinden emerged mainly as a result of human influence. The growth of the population in the 14th century meant that the pastures of the Black Forest valleys were no longer sufficient for the grazing of cattle. For this reason, cattle and goats were driven to pasture on the flat highlands with their open stands of trees. The so-called Weidbrennen or pasture-burning at the end of the grazing year hindered the growth of trees, promoted the growth of grass and increased the areas for grazing. Through the use of the highlands as pasture the land nearer the villages could be used for the production of hay. However overgrazing of the highlands led to soil compaction and a loss of nutrients by the 16th century. The result was that the land became waterlogged and bogs formed due to the high level of precipitation of up to 2,200 mm/year. These processes led to the formation of the grinden.

Grazing on the grinden lasted for 500 years until the 19th century. in the mid-18th century Weidbrennen had led to such large scale destruction of the forest that it was banned. With the emergence of cattle sheds, the grazing came to an end. The grinden, however, continued to be used for making hay, especially from matgrass (Nardus stricta), which the farmers believed had healing properties for the animals. In the mid-1950s, with the decline of cattle grazing, even this form of farming was increasingly abandoned. With the end of the agricultural use of the grinden the forest began to gradually re-establish itself. In addition to a natural reforestation by the natural seeding of pine trees, especially mountain pine, the areas were also reforested in a managed way from the 18th century. The grinden on the Enz heights were thus reforested by the 19th century.

== Flora and fauna ==
The grinden lie on nutrient-poor soils of the main conglomerate of the bunter sandstone, which has a major effect on the characteristic grinde ecology.

Typical plants: matgrass, German deergrass, moor grass, heather, bilberry, cowberry, bog bilberry, mountain pine, peat moss and cottongrass.

Typical animals: capercaillie ruffed grouse.

== Literature ==
- Wolfgang Schlund (text), Naturschutzzentrum Ruhestein (ed.): Der Grindenschwarzwald. (Medienkombination), pk-Verlag, Freiamt o.J., ISBN 3-9810385-0-9
- Ludwig Schülli: Der Staatswald Kaltenbronn : ein Beispiel für die Entwicklung der Forstwirtschaft in den Waldungen des nördlichen Schwarzwaldes während der letzten 200 Jahre. Schriftenreihe der Landesforstverwaltung Baden-Württemberg Vol. 8; Maly, Karlsruhe, 1959
