= Hornisgrinde =

Mountain in Germany

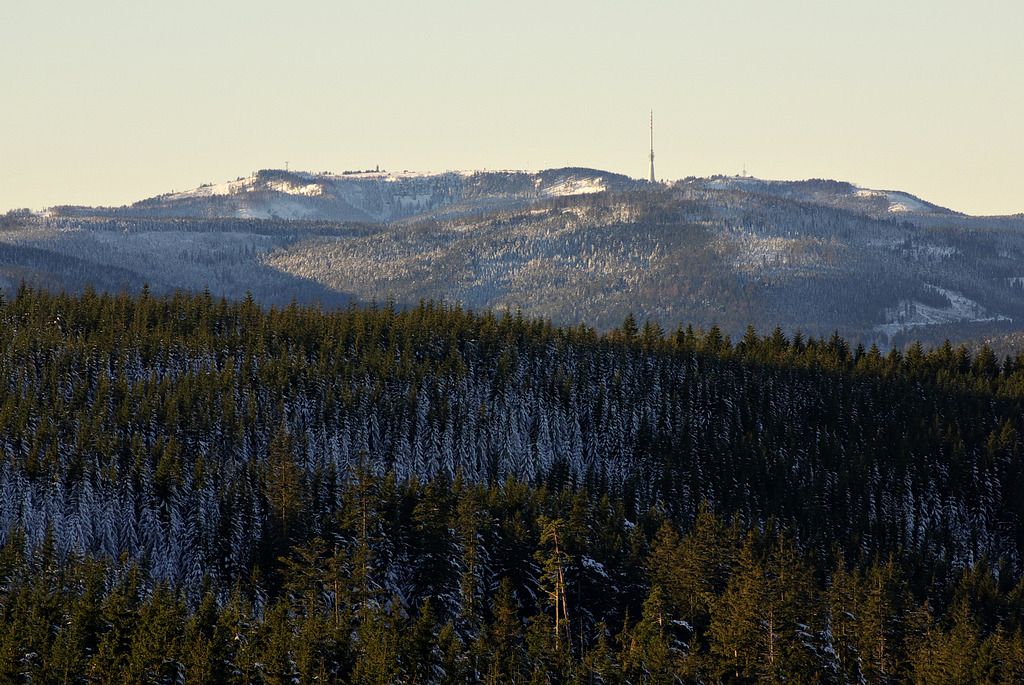
- The Hornisgrinde seen from the Hohloh to the northeast

Highest point
- Elevation: 1,164 m (3,819 ft)
- Isolation: 54.63 km (33.95 mi) to Griesbacher Eck
- Coordinates: 48°36′25″N 8°12′9″E

Geography
- Location within Baden-Württemberg
- Location: Baden-Württemberg, Germany
- Parent range: Black Forest

The Hornisgrinde, 1,164 m (3,820 ft), is the highest mountain in the Northern Black Forest of Germany. The Hornisgrinde lies in northern Ortenaukreis district.

== Origin of the name ==
The name is probably derived from Latin, and essentially translates to "boggy head," referring to the raised bog (Hochmoor). Another interpretation of the name is derived from the terms Horn, miss and grind and meant the same as kahler Bergrücken ("bald ridge"), which carries a moorland on its height.

== Geography ==
The summit of the Hornisgrinde is framed by the Muhrkopf (1003 m), near Unterstmatt, in the north and the Mummelsee (1036 m) in the south. Its western slope is cut through by the Schwarzwaldhochstraße (B 500) at approximately 900 to 1000 m, while, on its east side, the Hornisgrinde drops steeply into the ice-age cirque Biberkessel, landing in Blindsee Lake. The summit merges into another mountain, the Katzenkopf, in the southwest at 1123 m. To the southeast drops a burr toward Seibelseckle. The Katzenkopf and the southeast burr of the Hornisgrinde form the cirque of the Mummelsee.

=== Grinden and raised bogs ===
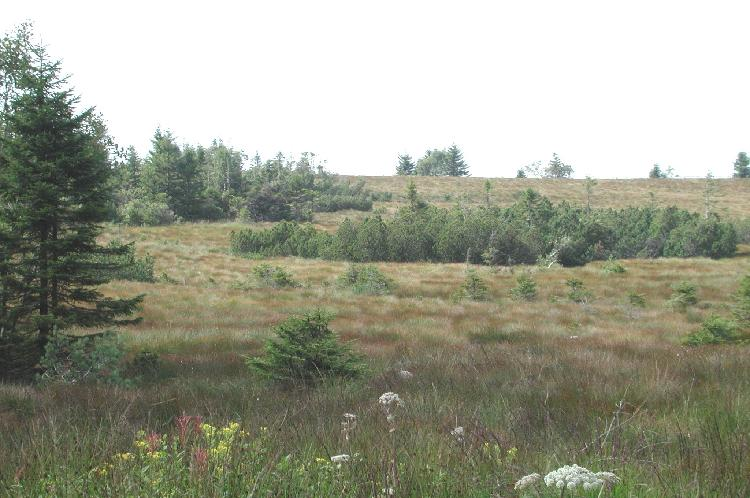
Protected areas of the raised bog on the summit plateau of the Hornisgrinde with typical bog vegetation and crooked, stunted fir trees

The Grinden - treeless wet heathlands on the highest areas, were created following forest clearance and the subsequent use of the land as grazing in the 15th century. By contrast the raised bog, up to five metres thick, in the southeastern area of the summit plateau is naturally treeless. It is reckoned to be at least 6,000 years old.

Parts of the plateau with the raised bog and the Karwand to the Biberkessel were designated as the Hornisgrinde-Biberkessel Nature Reserve (Naturschutzgebiet Hornisgrinde–Biberkessel, 95 ha.) in 1992.

== Climate ==
The Hornisgrinde belongs to the precipitation-richest places in Germany. The average yearly precipitation amounts to 1931 mm. Over 99% of the measuring points of the German weather service indicate lower values. The driest month is February; at most it rains in June. There's 1.4 times more precipitation in the precipitation-richest month than in the driest one. The seasonal precipitation fluctuations lie in the upper third. In over 81% of all places the monthly precipitation varies less.

== History ==
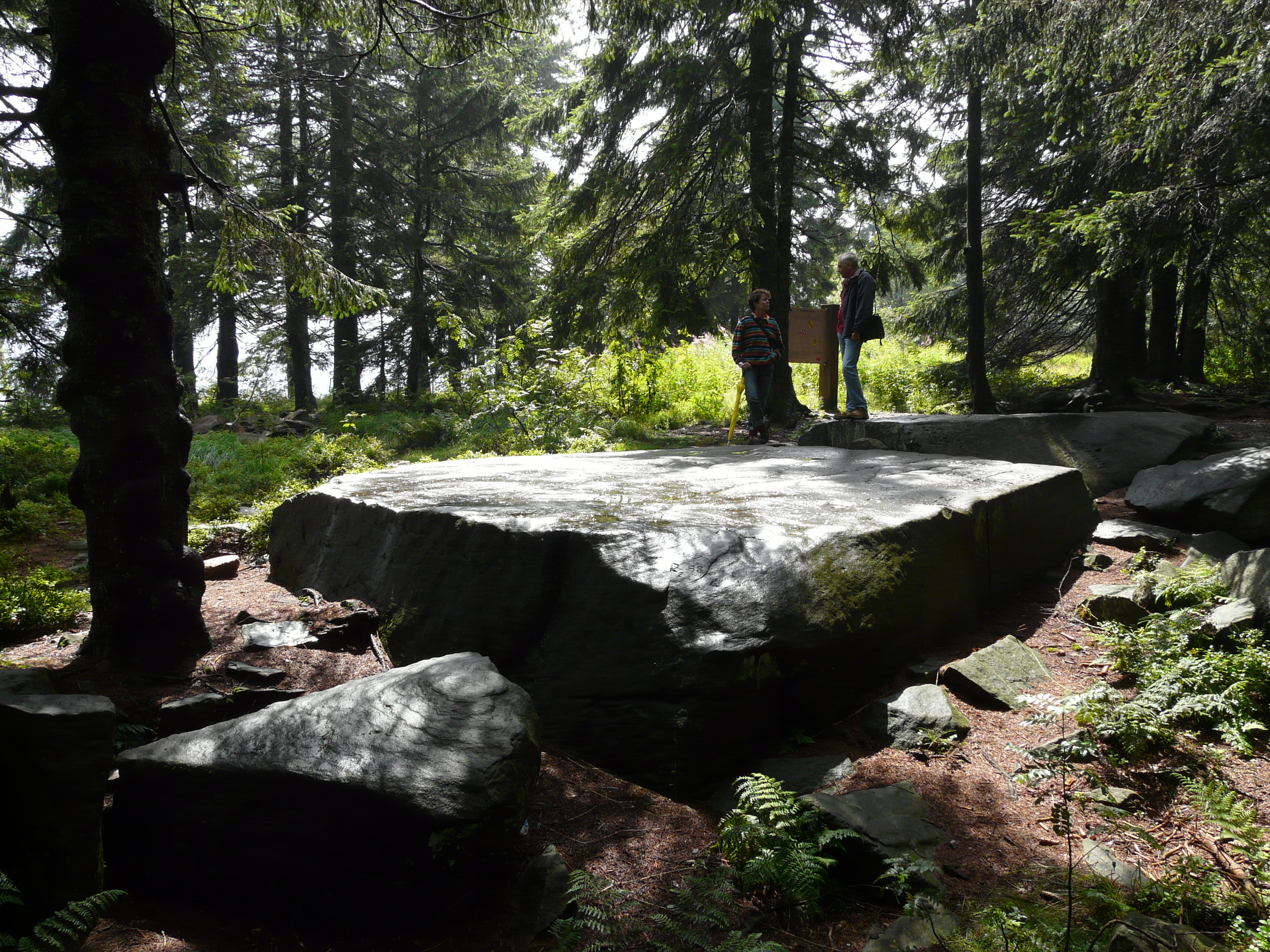
Dreifürstenstein

=== Dreifürstenstein ===
The Dreifürstenstein is a sandstone plate, which is located at the southeast edge of the plateau. It originates from the year 1722 and marked the border between the Margraviate of Baden, the duchy Württemberg and the Diocese of Strasbourg. Today the point represents the boundary border between Baden's municipalities Sasbach, Seebach and Württemberg's municipality Baiersbronn. With a height of 1,151 m above sea level the Dreifürstenstein is the highest point of Württemberg.

=== Military use ===
In 1938 the entire southern range of the summit level was declared as the military restricted area. First being in use since 1942 by the German Forces as an air defense position, the French took over the location in 1945. These operated on the Hornisgrinde an observing station on behalf of the French foreign secret service DGSE. Later the location was used parallel also by the Bundeswehr and NATO. After the plant went out of operation in 1994, it lay fallow several years. The restricted area was released in 1997. In 1999 the neighbor municipalities took over the federal area. Some of the buildings and masts are preserved, however they're purging more and more.

== Tourism ==
The long-distance footpath, the West Way runs across the ridge, and the Black Forest High Road runs over the western and southern sides of the mountain, with a large car park at the Mummelsee. From there an educational path with information boards by the Ruhestein nature conservation centre leads across the summit plateau, crossing the raised bog on a board walk.

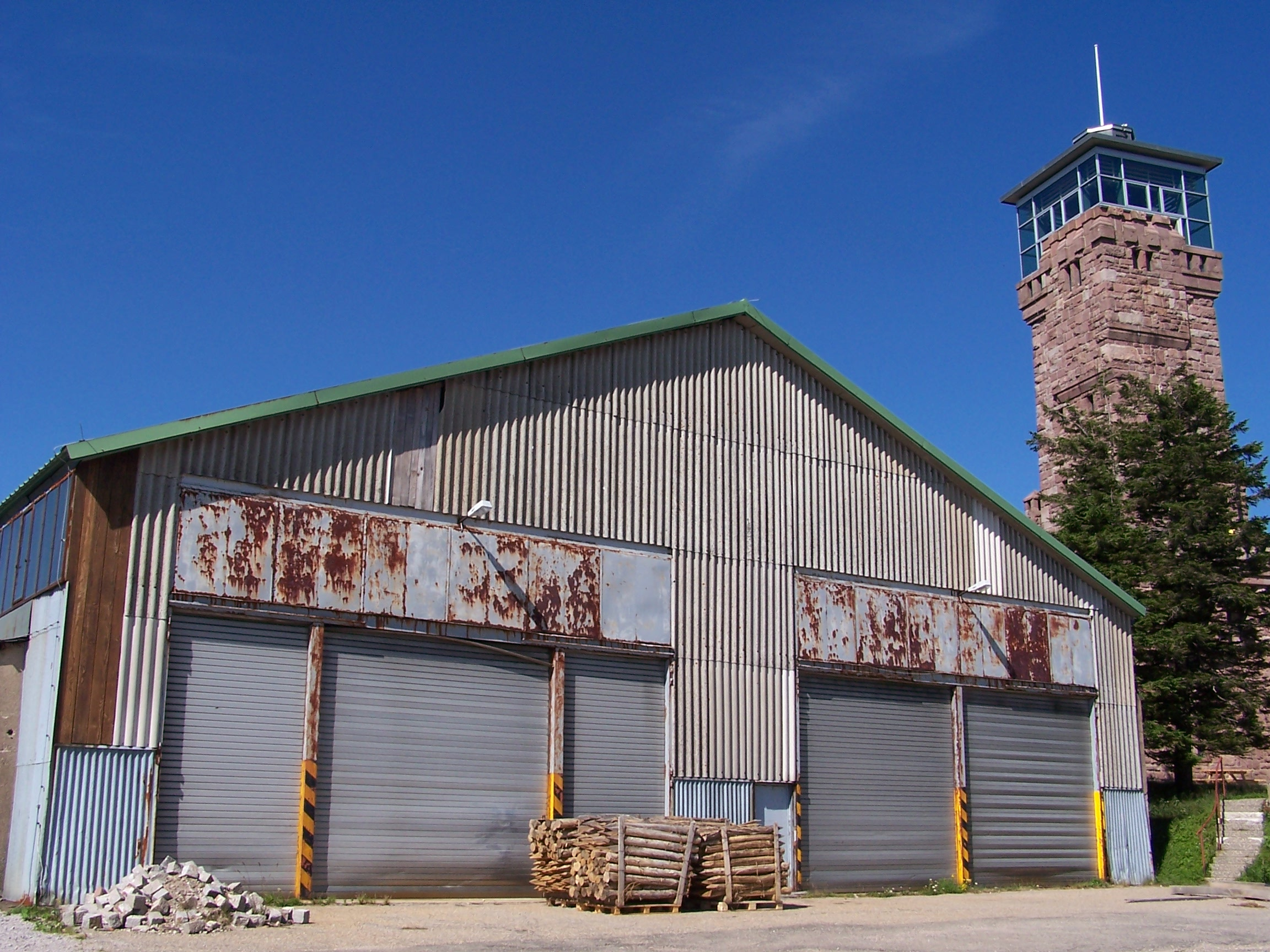
Old hangar below the tower

=== Observation tower ===
At the southern end, above the Mummelsee, stands the 23-metre-high Hornisgrinde Tower. The construction of this observation tower in 1910 was an initiative by the Black Forest Club branch in Baden. New red sandstone was used as the building material. Together with the Mummelsee, the tower was one of the most popular destinations in the region at that time. In 1942 it was commandeered by the Luftwaffe. After World War II it was used by the French military. In 2000 the Seebach forestry association acquired the tower from the Federation and transferred it to the municipality of Seebach as a lease. On 29 May 2005 the tower was opened again to the public.

=== Signal tower ===
At the highest point of the mountain, in the midst of the summit level is a further tower, the 7 meters high signal tower established around 1840. In 1892 it was converted by assembly of stairs at the exterior into an observation tower. However, it was inaccessible during the military use of the summit. In 2000 the tower (also called Bismarck tower) was reorganized and made again accessible by a steel spiral stair lying outside.

== Winter sports ==
=== Alpine ===
There is no lift system to the top of the Hornisgrinde itself. However, north of the summit is the Skizirkus Unterstmatt, with two lifts at the north slope of the Muhrkopf. To the south is the nearby ski lift of Seibelseckle.

=== Cross-country skiing ===
Around the summit of the Hornisgrinde leads a 14 km long loipe consisting of the Mummelseeloipe (6 km), Hundsrückenloipe (4.5 km) and the Ochsenstall-Seibelseckle loipe (3.5 km). It is prepared for classical and skating technology. Entrance possibilities are at the Mummelsee, at the col Seibelseckle and at the col Unterstmatt.

== Technical plants ==
- Due to the high average wind speed of 5.2 m/s in the annual average on the Hornisgrinde in the mid-1990s a commercial wind park was established. In 1994 two wind-power plants of 110 KW each one were built in private initiative, a third one with 132 KW followed in 1996. Like on other places there are controversial discusses the exposed location.
- Also on top of the Hornisgrinde is a 206 m (676 ft) high radio tower of the Südwestrundfunk, transmitting radio and television programmes. The tower is not open to the public.
- At the northern end of the summit plateau is a transmitting tower of the German Telekom AG. It accommodates a relay station for amateur television. Until 2005 also the program of the Deutschlandfunk was radiated by this tower, later the transmitter was shifted to the higher and thus far handing SWR tower. Also this tower is not accessible for the public.

== Photo gallery ==
Hornisgrinde

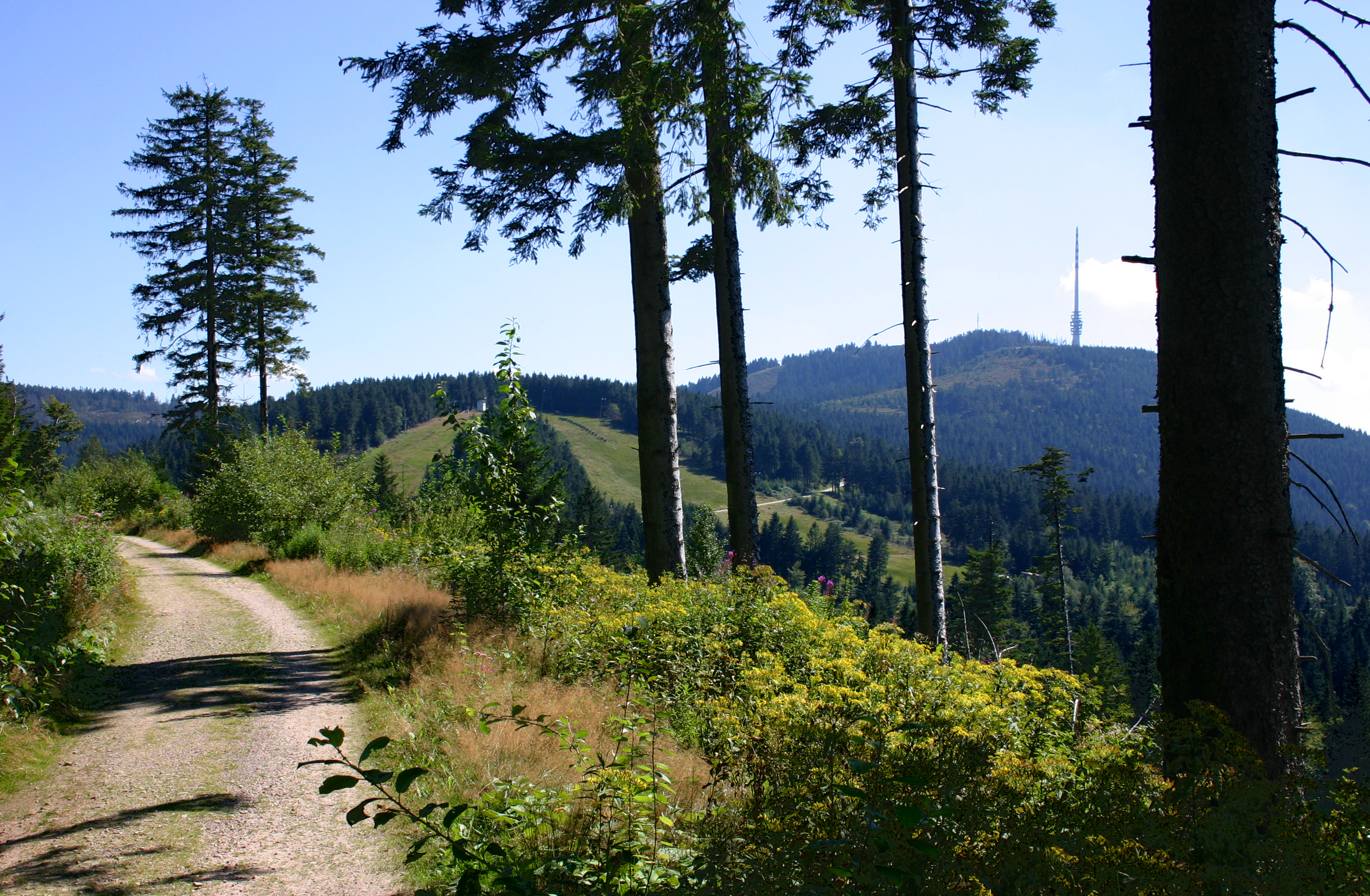
Hornisgrinde from the south

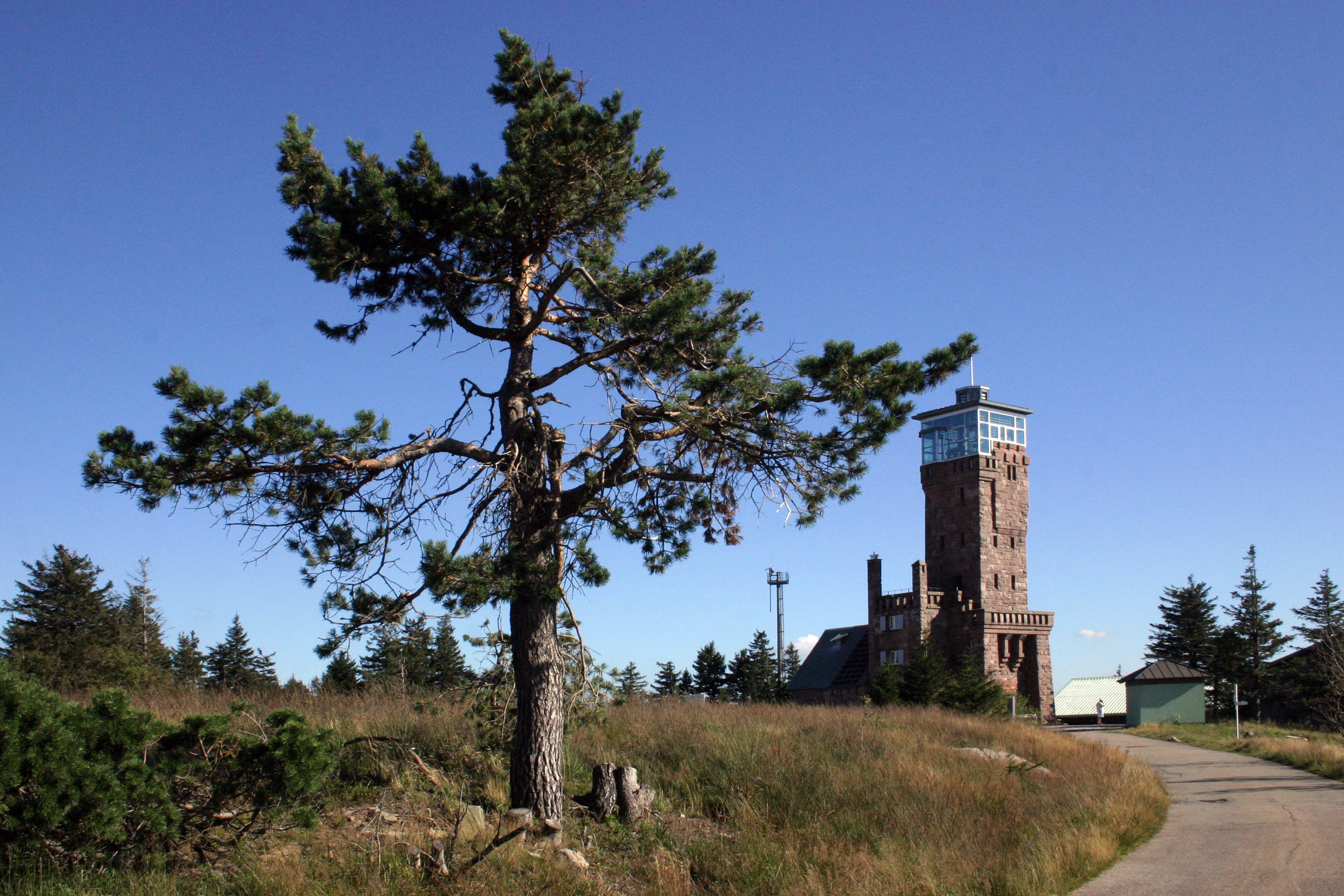
Observation tower

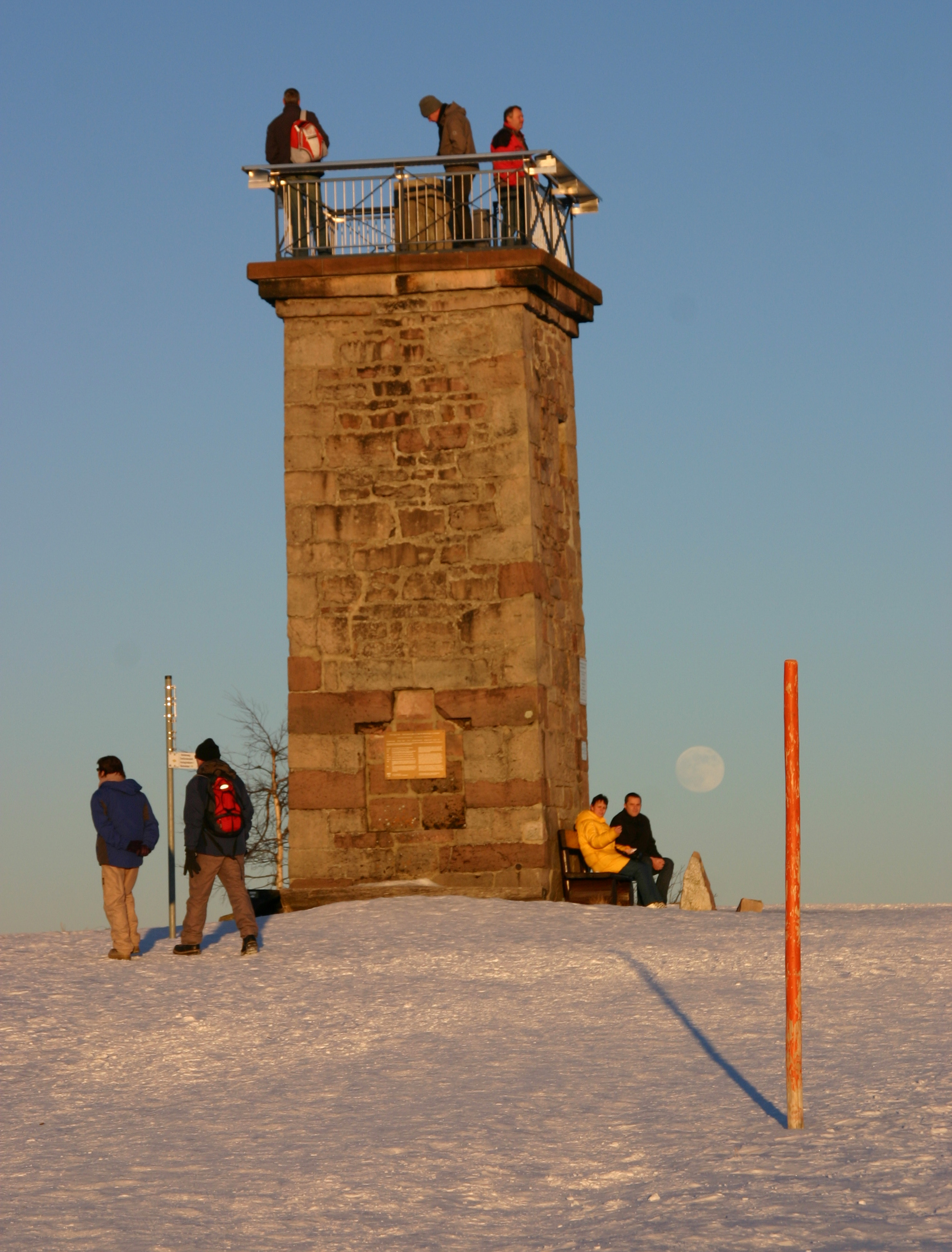
Bismarck Tower

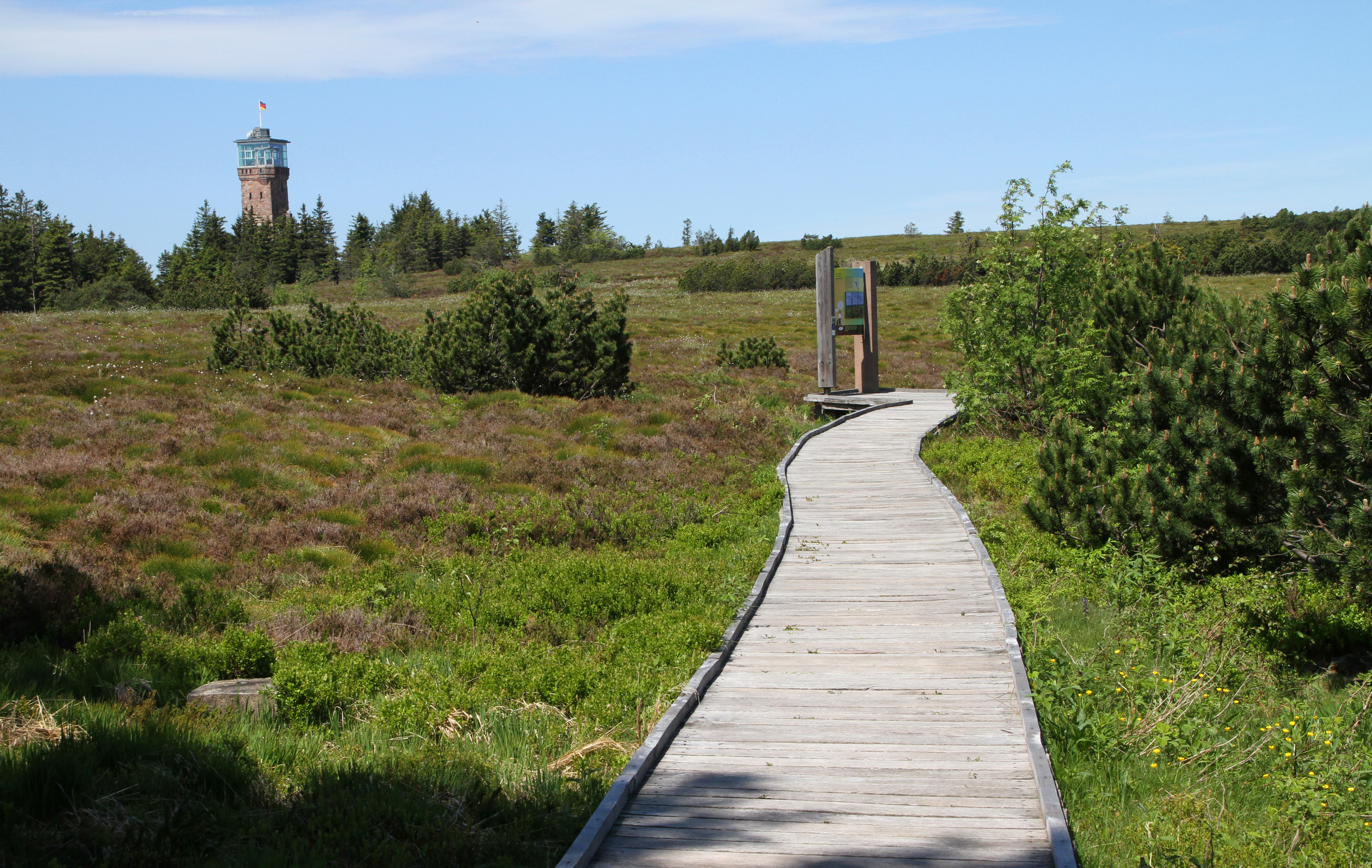
Boardwalk in the raised bog

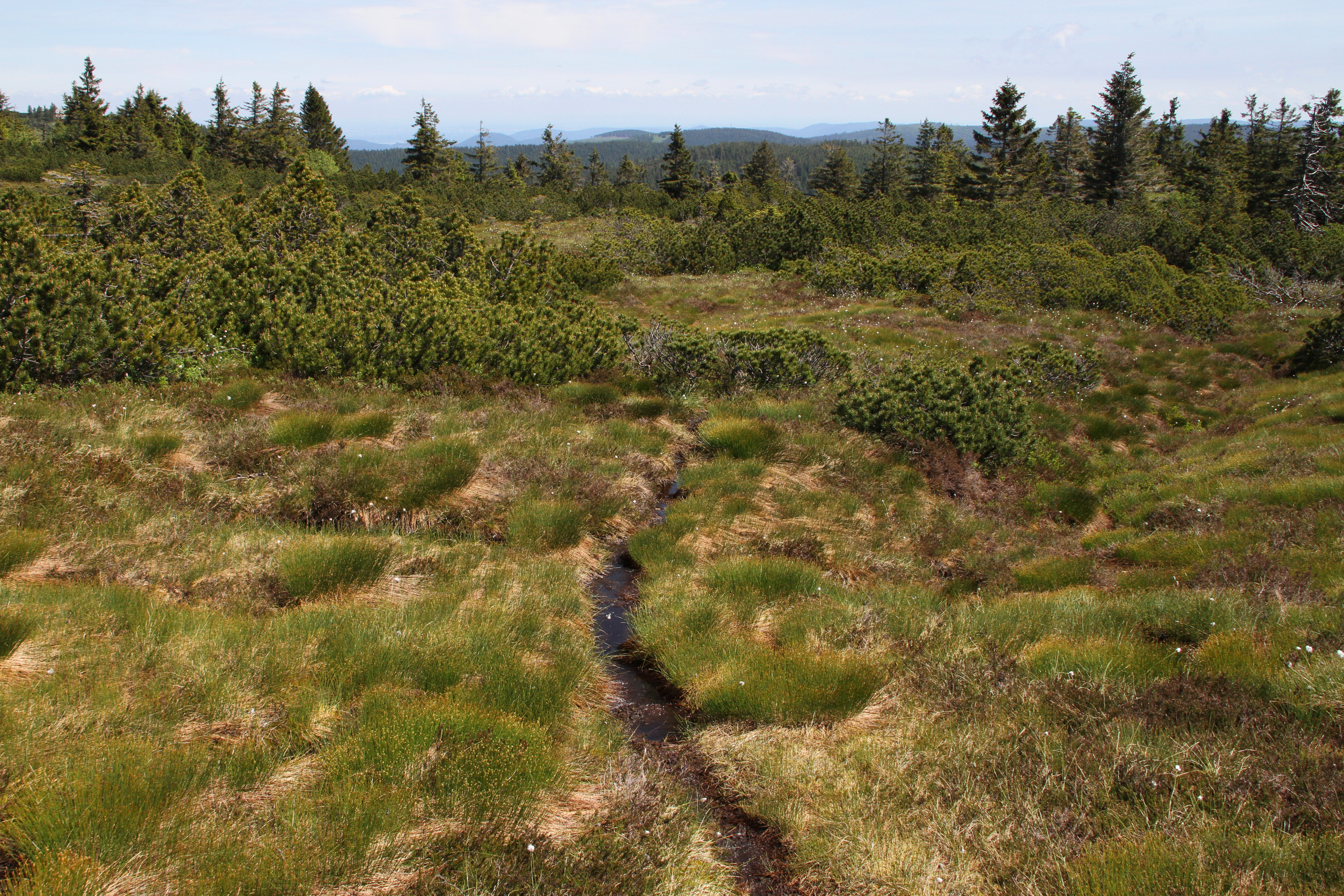
Raised bog

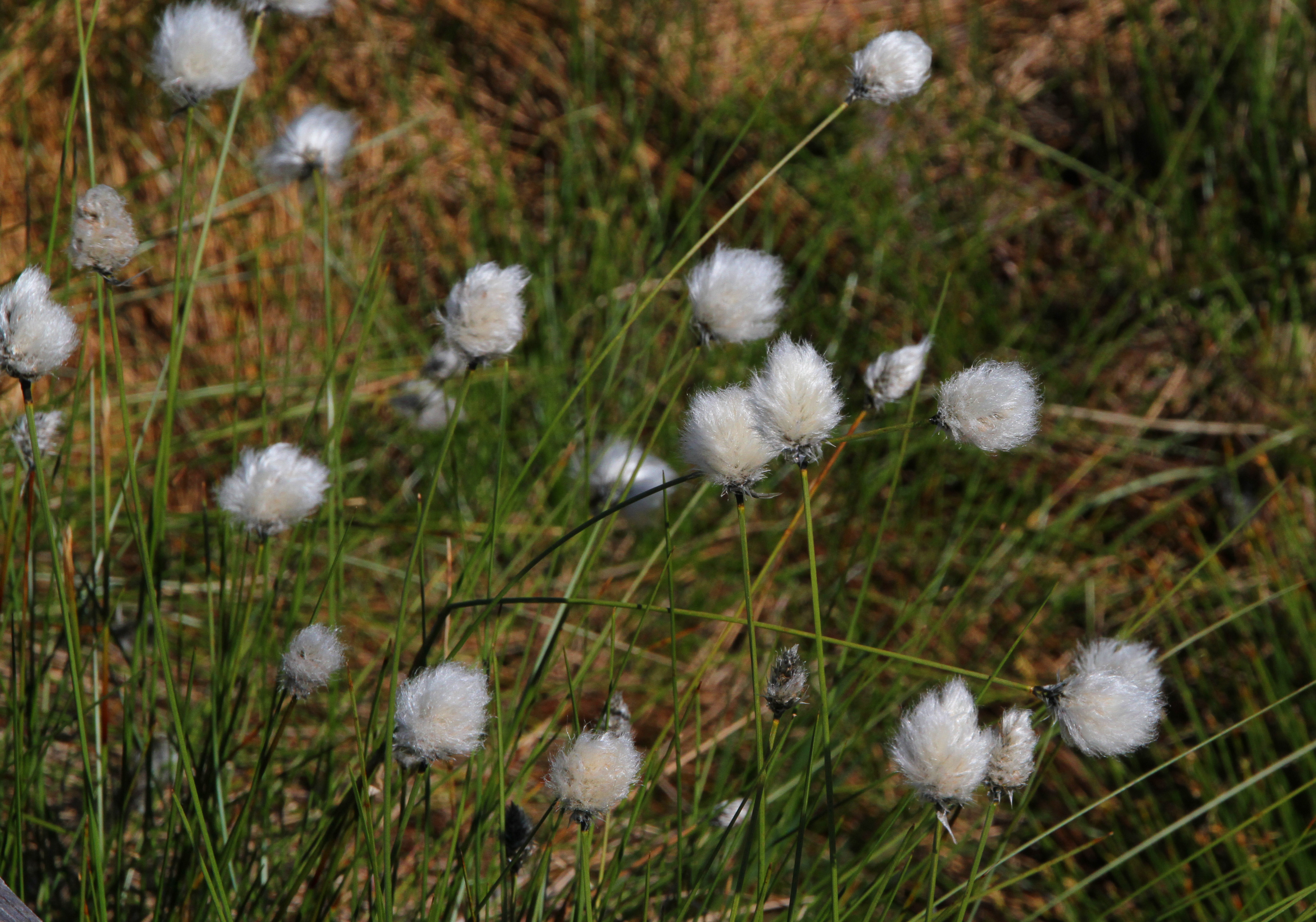
Cotton grass

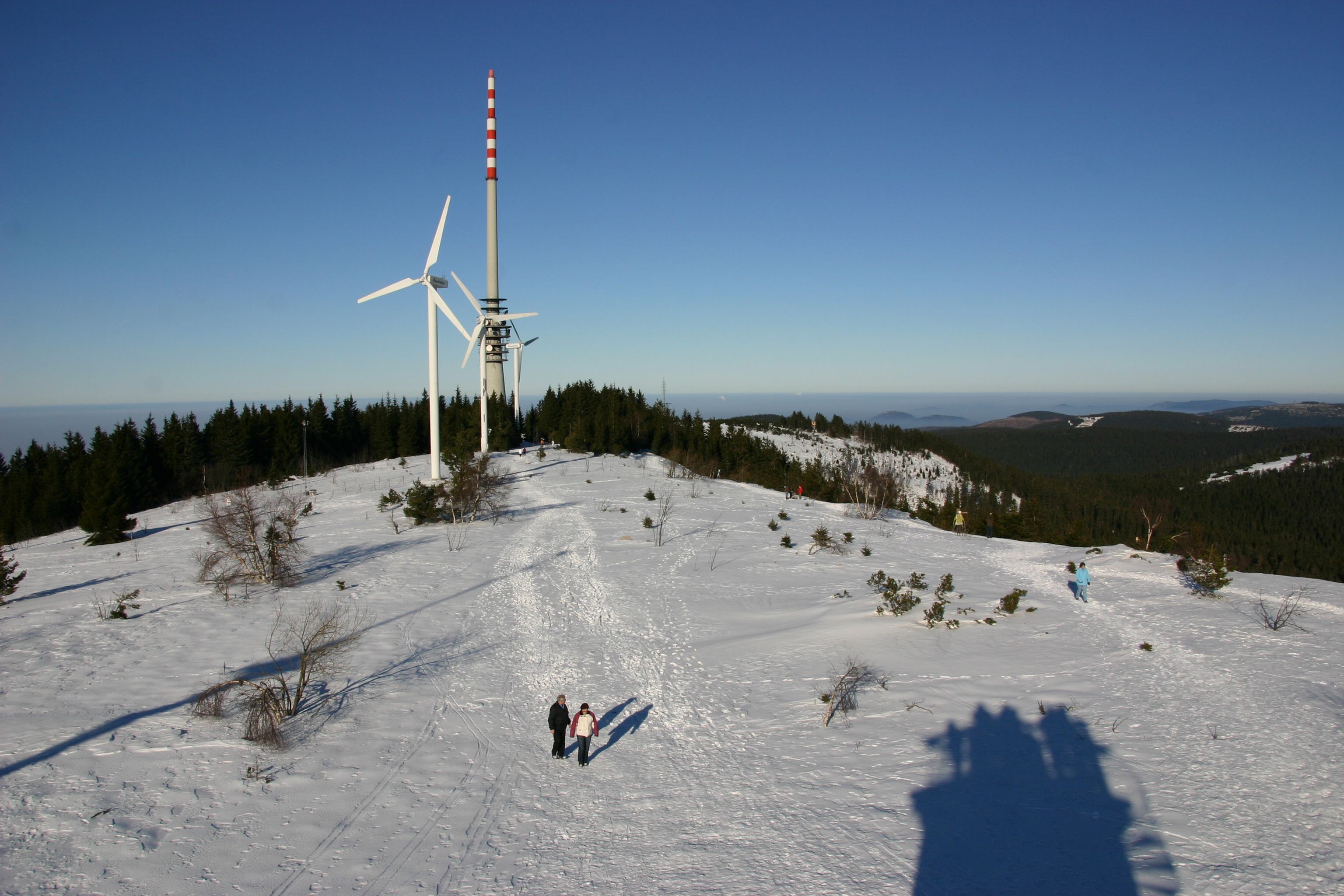
Wind park

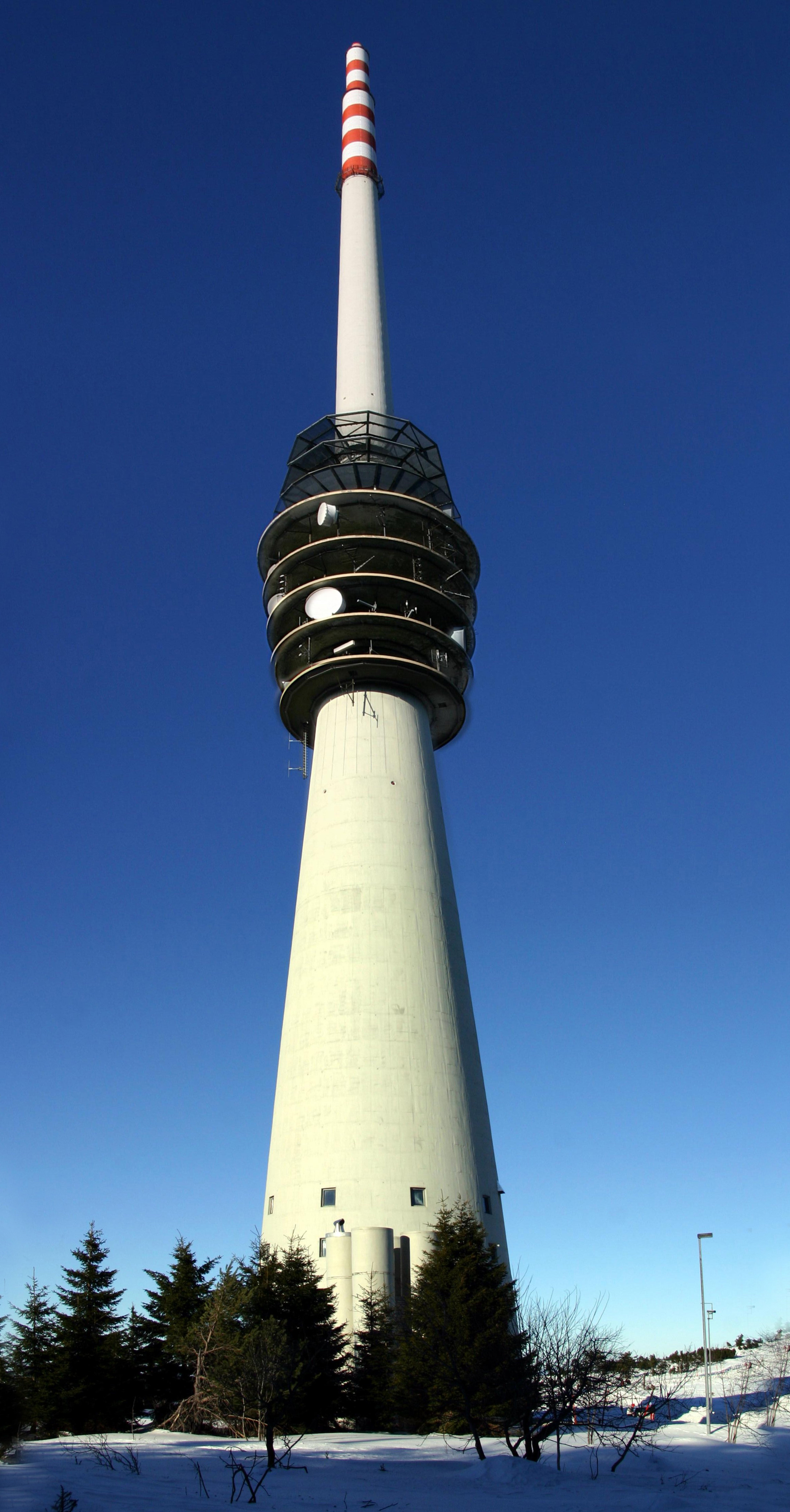
Radio tower

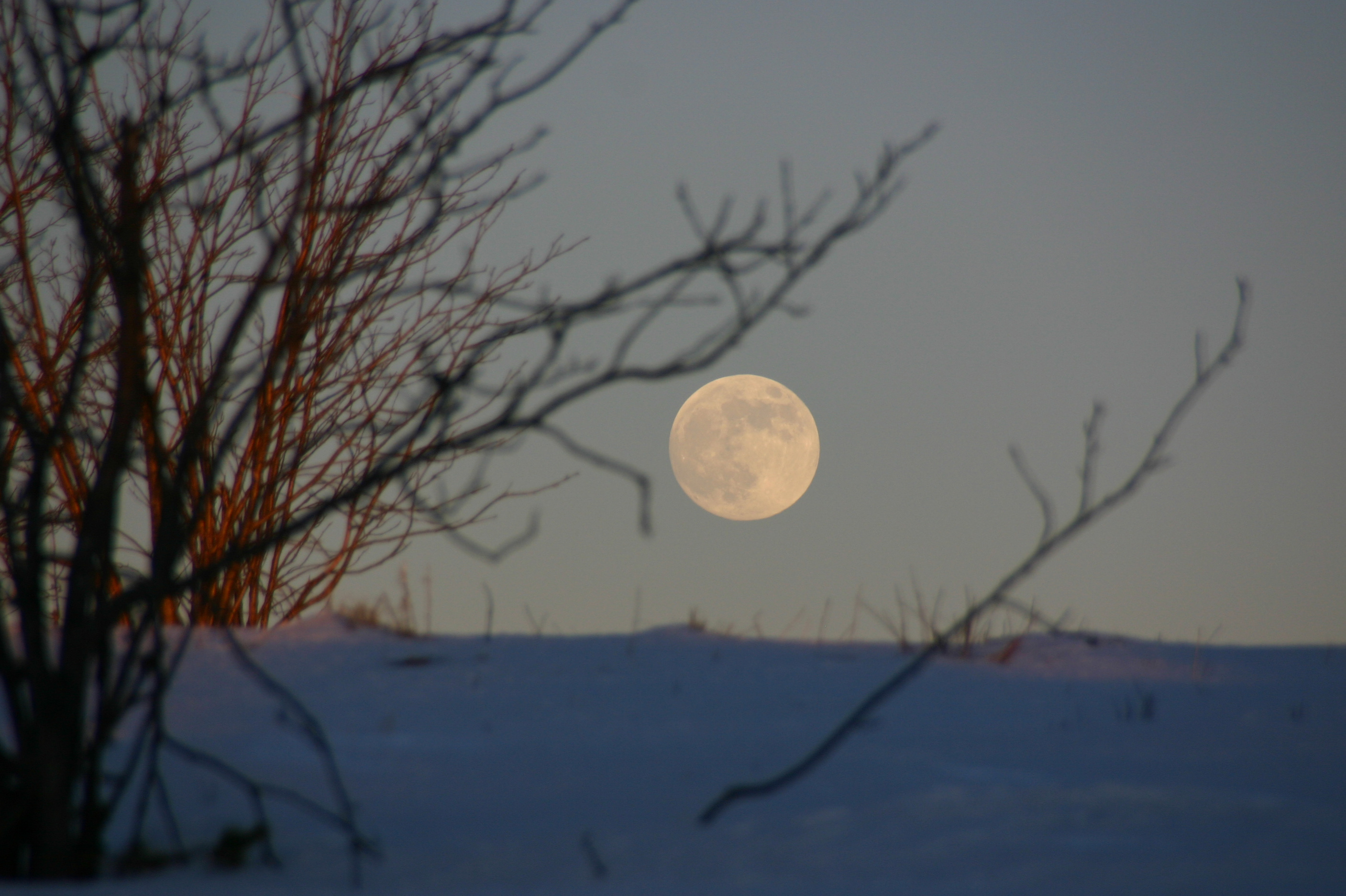
Moon rise

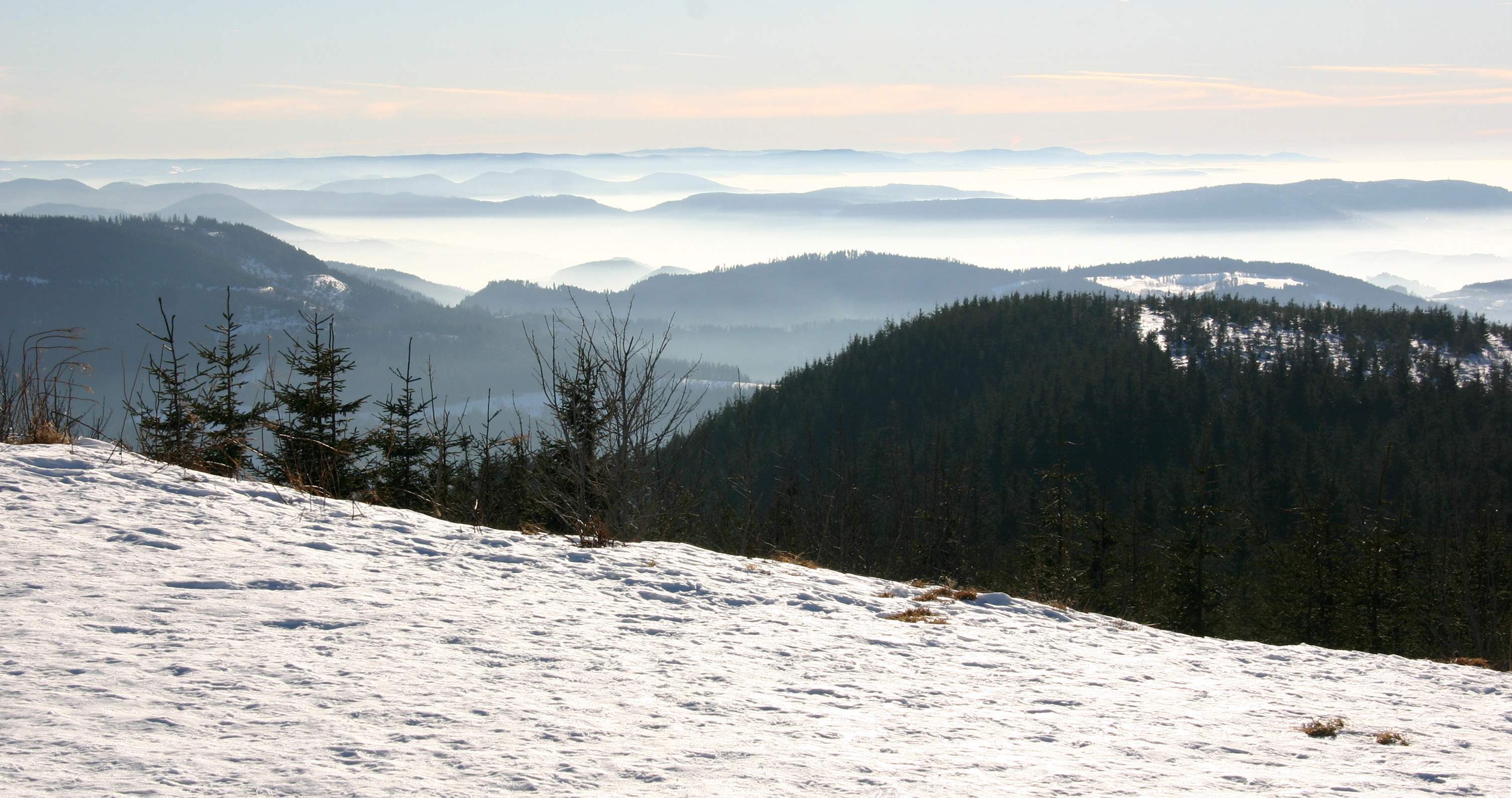
Winter

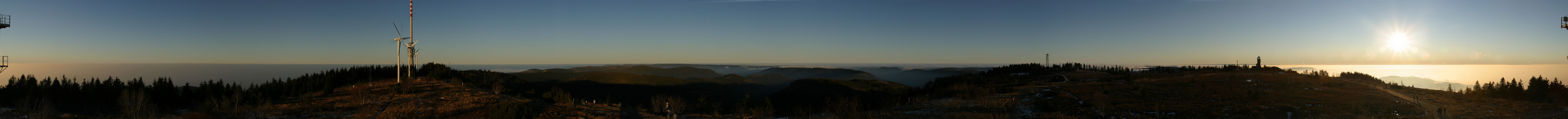
Panorama of the Hornisgrinde
