= Gäu Perimeter Way =

Hiking trail in Germany

- Length: 120 km
- Location: Germany, Baden-Württemberg, Black Forest
- Trailheads: Mühlacker; Freudenstadt
- Use: long distance path
- Highest point: Freudenstadt (732 m (2,401 ft 7 in) DE)
- Lowest point: Mühlacker (240 m (787 ft 5 in) DE)
- Difficulty: easy
- Season: spring to autumn
- Months: March–October
- Waymark: green diamond with red rose hip on white background Waymark
- Maintained by: Black Forest Club

The Gäu Perimeter Way (German: Gäurandweg) is a hiking trail in the Northern Black Forest in Germany and the easternmost of the long distance paths managed by the Black Forest Club. With a length of 120 kilometres, it runs in six stages from Mühlacker to Freudenstadt.

The waymark of the Gäu Perimeter Way is a green diamond with a red rose hip on a white background.

== Short description ==
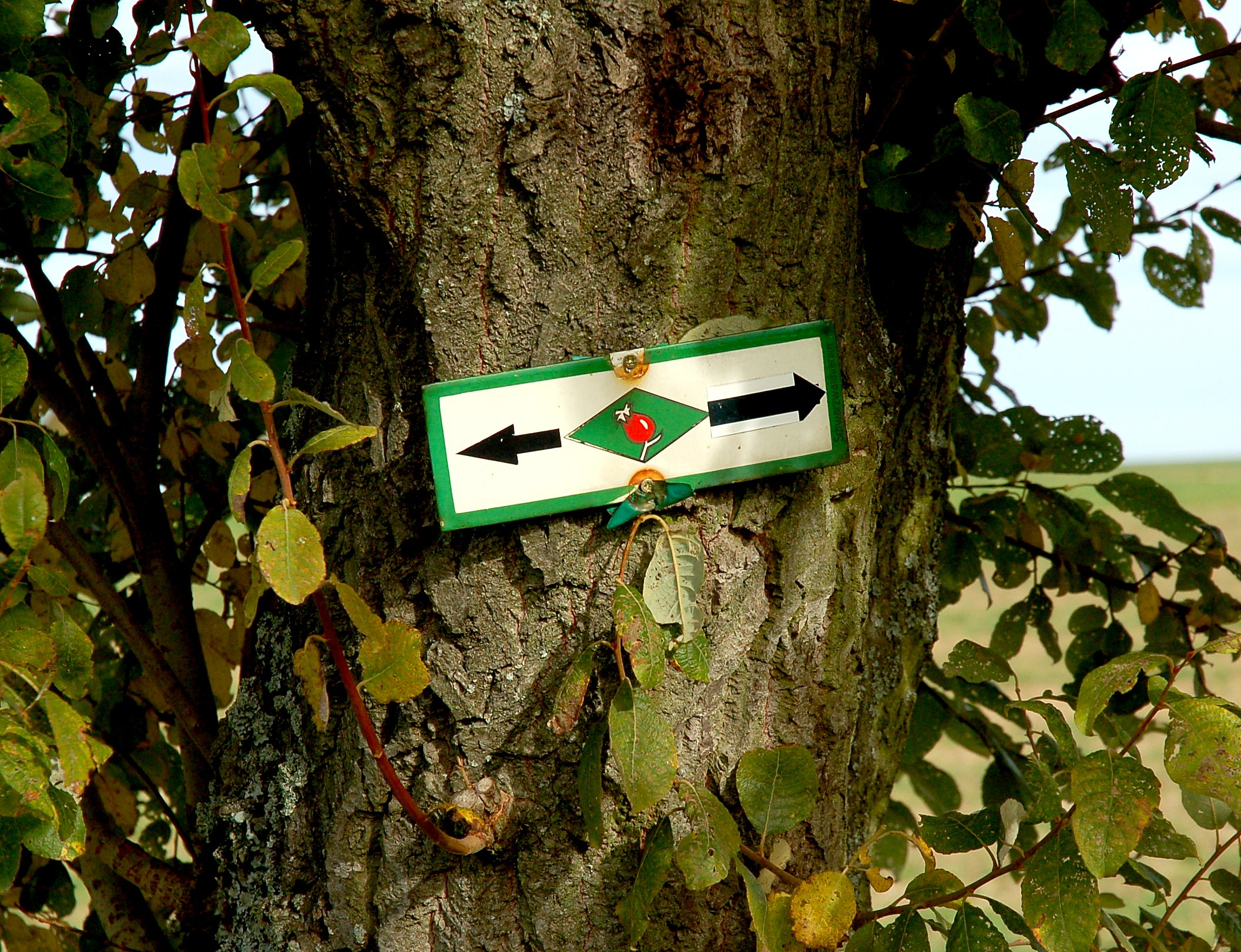
The red rose hip on a green diamond marks the Gäu Perimeter Way.

The Gäu Perimeter Way runs between the NPlacehern Black Forest in the west and the Strohgäu and Heckengäu in the east. From Mühlacker in the Enz valley the route runs via Pinache and Wiernsheim past Mönsheim to Friolzheim, Tiefenbronn and Steinegg. From there it continues via Neuhausen and Simmozheim past Althengstett to Calw-Stammheim. The path then passes through the villages of Gültlingen and Sulz am Eck, before reaching the Nagold valley in the town of Nagold. It then continues via Rohrdorf and Beihingen to Haiterbach. From Haiterbach the route runs through Salzstetten to Schopfloch and then through Glatten to Freudenstadt.

== Day tours/stages ==
=== First Stage: Mühlacker – Steinegg ===
- Distance: 22 kilometres
- Duration: c. 5.5 hours

| Place/Attraction | Route (km) | Height (m above NHN) | Further information |
|---|---|---|---|
| Mühlacker | 0 | 240 | |
| Pinache | 6.0 | 349 | Village in the municipality of Wiernsheim |
| Wiernsheim | 3.0 | 366 | |
| Paulinensee | 3.0 | 380 | Barbecue hut |
| Friolzheim | 4.5 | 451 | |
| Tiefenbronn | 3.0 | 432 | |
| Steinegg | 2.5 | 418 | |

=== Second Stage: Steinegg – Calw-Stammheim ===
- Distance: 24 kilometres
- Duration: c. 6 hours

| Place/Attraction | Route (km) | Height (m above NHN) | Further information |
|---|---|---|---|
| Steinegg | 0 | 418 | |
| Neuhausen | 4.5 | 482 | |
| Büchelberg Nature Reserve | 2.5 | 550 | |
| Möttlinger Köpfle | 4.5 | 576 | Woodland play park |
| Simmozheim | 2.0 | 483 | |
| Stammheim | 10.5 | 469 | Village in the municipality of Calw |

=== Third Stage: Stammheim – Wasserturm Oberjettingen ===
- Distance: 20 kilometres
- Duration: c. 5 hours

| Place/Attraction | Route (km) | Height (m above NHN) | Further information |
|---|---|---|---|
| Stammheim | 0 | 469 | Village in the municipality of Calw |
| Gültlingen | 9.0 | 454 | Village in the municipality of Wildberg |
| Sulz am Eck | 4.0 | 465 | Village in the municipality of Wildberg |
| Sulzer Eck | 1.5 | 576 | Barbecue hut |
| Kühlenberg | 3.0 | 625 | |
| Wasserturm Oberjettingen | 2.5 | 605 | |

=== Fourth Stage: Wasserturm Oberjettingen – Beihingen ===
- Distance: 20 kilometres
- Duration: c. 5 hours

| Place/Attraction | Route (km) | Height (m above NHN) | Further information |
|---|---|---|---|
| Wasserturm Oberjettingen | 0 | 605 | |
| Nagold | 4.5 | 411 | |
| Ruins of Hohennagold Castle | 1.5 | 515 | |
| Rohrdorf | 2.5 | 418 | |
| Walddorf | 3.0 | 561 | |
| Egenhäuser Kapf | 3.5 | 625 | |
| Egenhausen | 2.0 | 560 | |
| Beihingen | 3.0 | 460 | Village in the municipality of Haiterbach |

=== Fifth Stage: Beihingen – Schopfloch ===
- Distance: 19 kilometres
- Duration: c. 5 hours

| Place/Attraction | Route (km) | Height (m above NHN) | Further information |
|---|---|---|---|
| Beihingen | 0 | 460 | Village in the municipality of Haiterbach |
| Haiterbach | 3.5 | 706 | |
| Salzstetten | 7.5 | 596 | Village in the municipality of Waldachtal |
| Rödelsberg | 7.0 | 718 | |
| Schopfloch | 1.5 | 667 | |

=== Sixth Stage: Schopfloch – Freudenstadt ===
- Distance: 14 kilometres
- Duration: c. 4 hours

| Place/Attraction | Route (km) | Height (m above NHN) | Further information |
|---|---|---|---|
| Schopfloch | 0 | 667 | |
| Glatten | 4.0 | 535 | |
| Lauterbad | 7.0 | | |
| Freudenstadt | 3.0 | 732 | |

== Literature ==
- Reinhard Distel and Heinz R. Wittner: Wanderführer Schwarzwald-Heightnwege. 7th edn., Ostfildern, 1997. ISBN 3-8134-0213-4. pp. 142–153.
- Martin Kuhnle: Schwarzwald Mitte/Nord. Bergverlag Rother, Munich, 2013. ISBN 978-3-7633-4420-8. pp. 60–79.
- Gäu.Rand.Weg, Faltblatt, Plenum Heckengäu
