= Rohrdorf, Baden-Württemberg =

German municipality

Rohrdorf
- Municipality
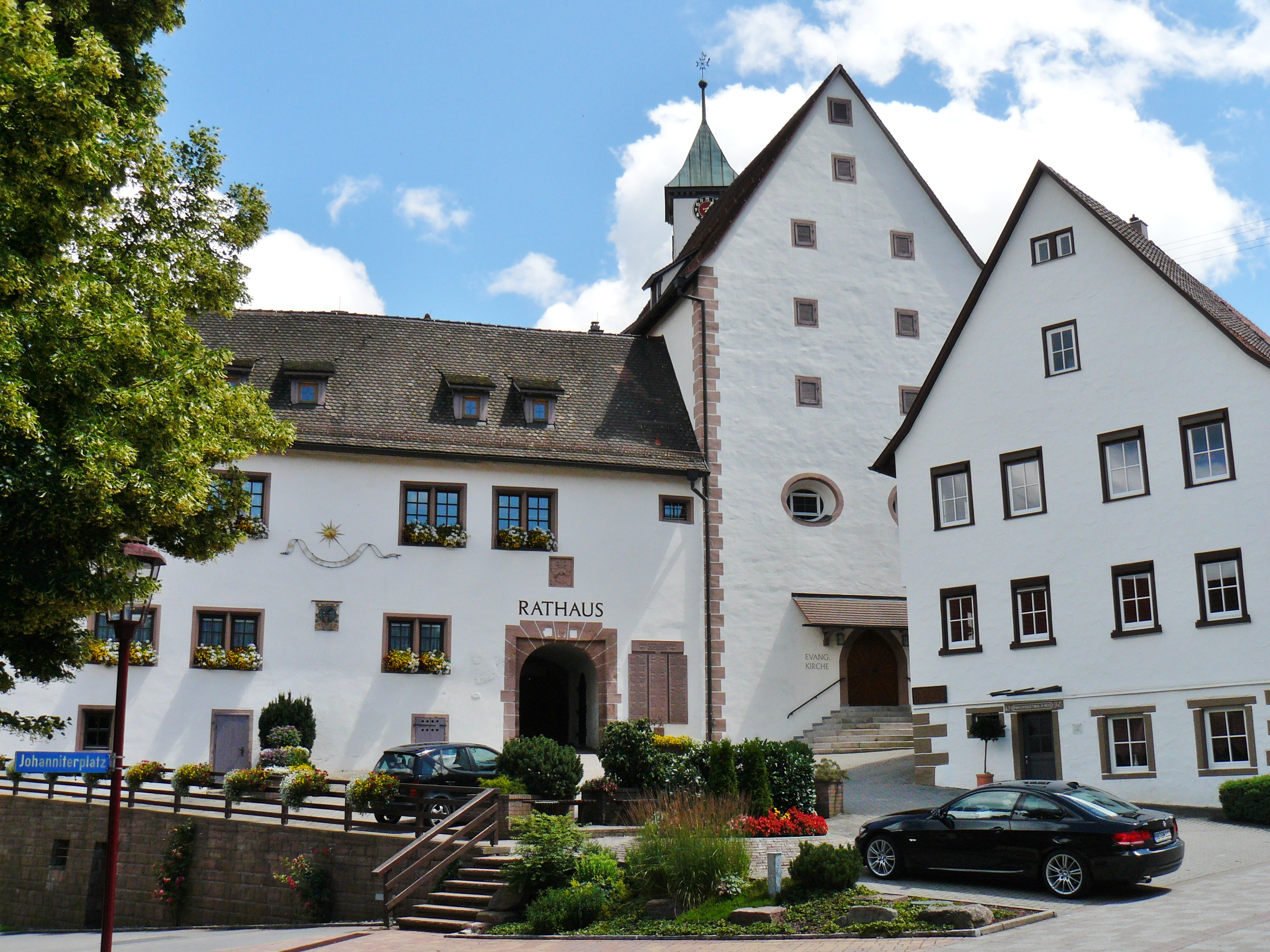
- Town hall and evangelist church, Rohrdorf

- Coat of arms

- Location of Rohrdorf within Calw district
- Interactive map of Rohrdorf
- Location within Germany Location within Baden-Württemberg
- Coordinates: 48°34′08″N 08°41′40″E
- Country: Germany
- State: Baden-Württemberg
- Admin. region: Karlsruhe
- District: Calw

Area
  - Total: 3.92 km^{2} (1.51 sq mi)
- Elevation: 418 m (1,371 ft)

Population (2025-12-31)
  - Total: 1,972
  - Density: 503/km^{2} (1,300/sq mi)
- Time zone: UTC+01:00 (CET)
  - Summer (DST): UTC+02:00 (CEST)
- Postal codes: 72229
- Dialling codes: 07452
- Vehicle registration: CW
- Website: www.gemeinde-rohrdorf.de

Rohrdorf (German pronunciation: [ˈʁoːɐ̯dɔʁf]) is a municipality of the district of Calw in Baden-Württemberg, Germany.

== History ==
Rohrdorf was ceded in 1303 in commendam by the County of Hohenberg to the Knights Hospitaller, who established a Commandery in the village that existed until 1806. Control of the town via patronage was a contest between the County of Württemberg and the Electoral Palatinate that began in 1363. Württemberg triumphed when in 1440 it purchased Wildberg from the Electoral Palatinate. Between 1363 and 1440, Rohrdorf was ruled by the House of Wöllhausen as vogts for the House of Württemberg. In 1738, the Duchy of Württemberg sold some of its rights over Rohrdorf and did not regain them until 1805. Rohrdorf was assigned to Oberamt Nagold, which was dissolved in 1938 and replaced by Landkreis Calw. Rohrdorf began a period of urban growth after World War II, expanding to north, east, and south. There was further development in the 1970s that added the Kämmerle industrial district.

== Geography ==
The municipality (Gemeinde) of Rohrdorf is situated in the district of Calw, in Baden-Württemberg, one of the 16 States of the Federal Republic of Germany. Rohrdorf is physically located in the Upper Gäu, a transitional landscape between the Heckengäu and the Northern Black Forest. Elevation above sea level in the municipal area ranges from a high of 576 meters (1,890 ft) Normalnull (NN) to a low of 403 meters (1,322 ft) NN.

A portion of the Federally protected Staufen nature reserve is located in Rohrdorf's municipal area.

== Culture ==
The Knights Hospitaller built the Church of Saint John and two palaces in Rohrdorf over the 15th and 16th centuries.

== Politics ==
Rohrdorf has a single borough (Ortsteil), Rohrdorf, and the industrial district of Kämmerle. The municipality has been cited by the government of Baden-Württemberg as one of ten model municipalities in regard to rural development. Rohrdorf is in a mutually-beneficial municipal association with the cities of Nagold and Haiterbach and the municipality of Ebhausen.

=== Coat of arms ===
The coat of arms of Rohrdorf is divided party per fess into an upper, red section and a lower, white section. A white Maltese cross is housed in the upper field. The tincture is taken from the arms of the House of Hohenberg, and the Maltese cross from the Knights Hospitaller. This coat of arms first saw in use since 1913 but was not adopted officially until 1956.

== Transportation ==
Rohrdorf is connected to Germany's network of roadways by Bundesstraße 28. Local public transportation is provided by the Verkehrsgesellschaft Bäderkreis Calw.
