= Heckengäu =

Part of the Gäu region in Baden-Württemberg, Germany

Coordinates: 48°45′N 8°49′E

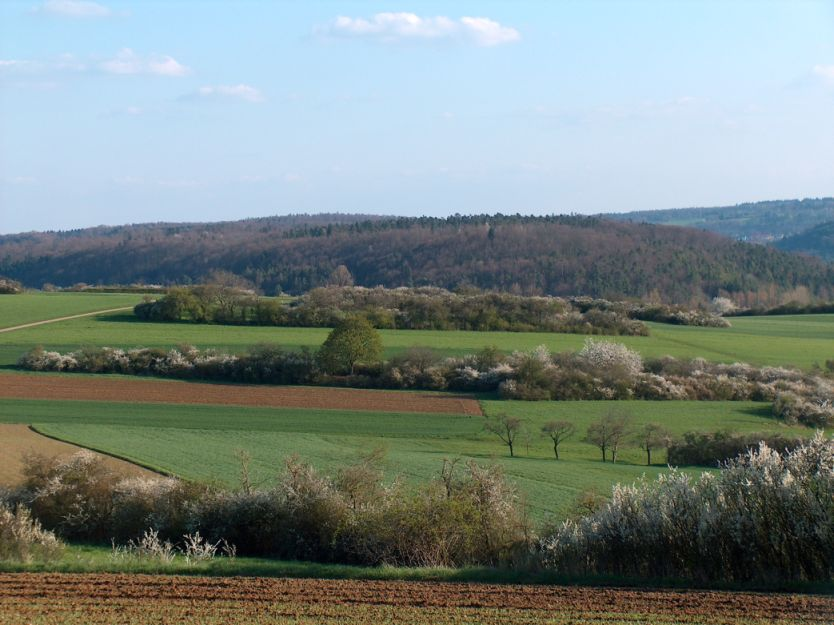
The Heckengäu near Weil der Stadt

The Heckengäu (German pronunciation: [ˈhɛkn̩ˌɡɔɪ̯]) is a part of the Gäu, a region in the counties of Böblingen, Calw, Ludwigsburg and Enzkreis in the German state of Baden-Württemberg. Part of the landscape in the county of Calw is called Schlehengäu. Hence it is also called the Hecken- und Schlehengäu.

== Location ==
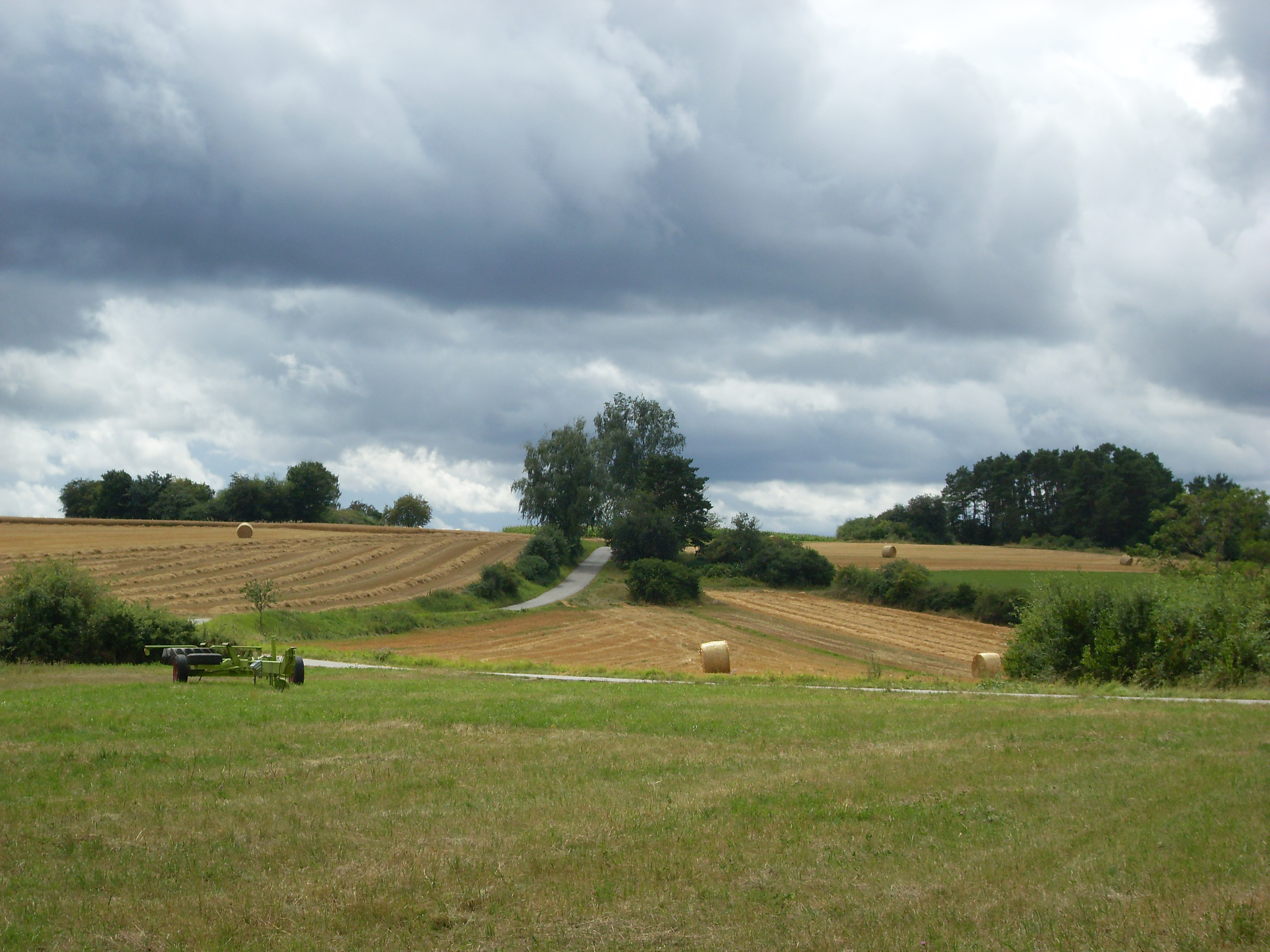
The Heckengäu near Malmsheim

The Heckengäu lies west of the state capital of Stuttgart. It forms an elongated strip of land, over 50 km long, running from Vaihingen an der Enz in the north to Haiterbach in the south, and covers parts of the counties of Böblingen, Calw, Ludwigsburg and the Enzkreis. In the west it borders on the Northern Black Forest and, in the east, on the regions of the Korngäu, Strohgäu and Schönbuch. Together with the Korngäu, Strohgäu and Zabergäu it makes up the Baden-Württemberg Gäu.

== Landscape and geology ==
The Heckengäu is an agricultural region, characterized by a rolling, heavily farmed landscape (the Gäulandschaft or Gäu landscape). Due to its karstified muschelkalk bedrock, the Heckengäu is a dry, edaphic region. Its typical soils are rendzinas and, in terrain hollows, loess deposits from which brown earths (Parabraunerden) can form. The Heckengäu has karstic topographic features such as dry valleys, dolines, karst springs, pots and washouts (Ausschwemmungen). The Heckengäu is also characterised by juniper heaths and orchards, but most of all by hedges that are grow on rows of fieldstones and are reflected in the name of the region (Hecken = hedges). The sloe hedges typical of the eastern Calw county also give the region there its local name of Schlehengäu.

== Hills ==
The highest hills (with heights in metres above sea level (NN)) of the Heckengäu are found near Calw-Stammheim (Daumen, 611 m) and in and around the eastern Althengstett (Köpfle, 606 m and Jägerberg 591 m). Other typical Gäu uplands are, for example, near the Sieben Tannen ("Seven Firs") with the villages of Deckenpfronn, Oberjettingen and Kuppingen and the Tannenäcker plateau between Althengstett, Stammheim and Gechingen, that climbs to a height of 580 m.

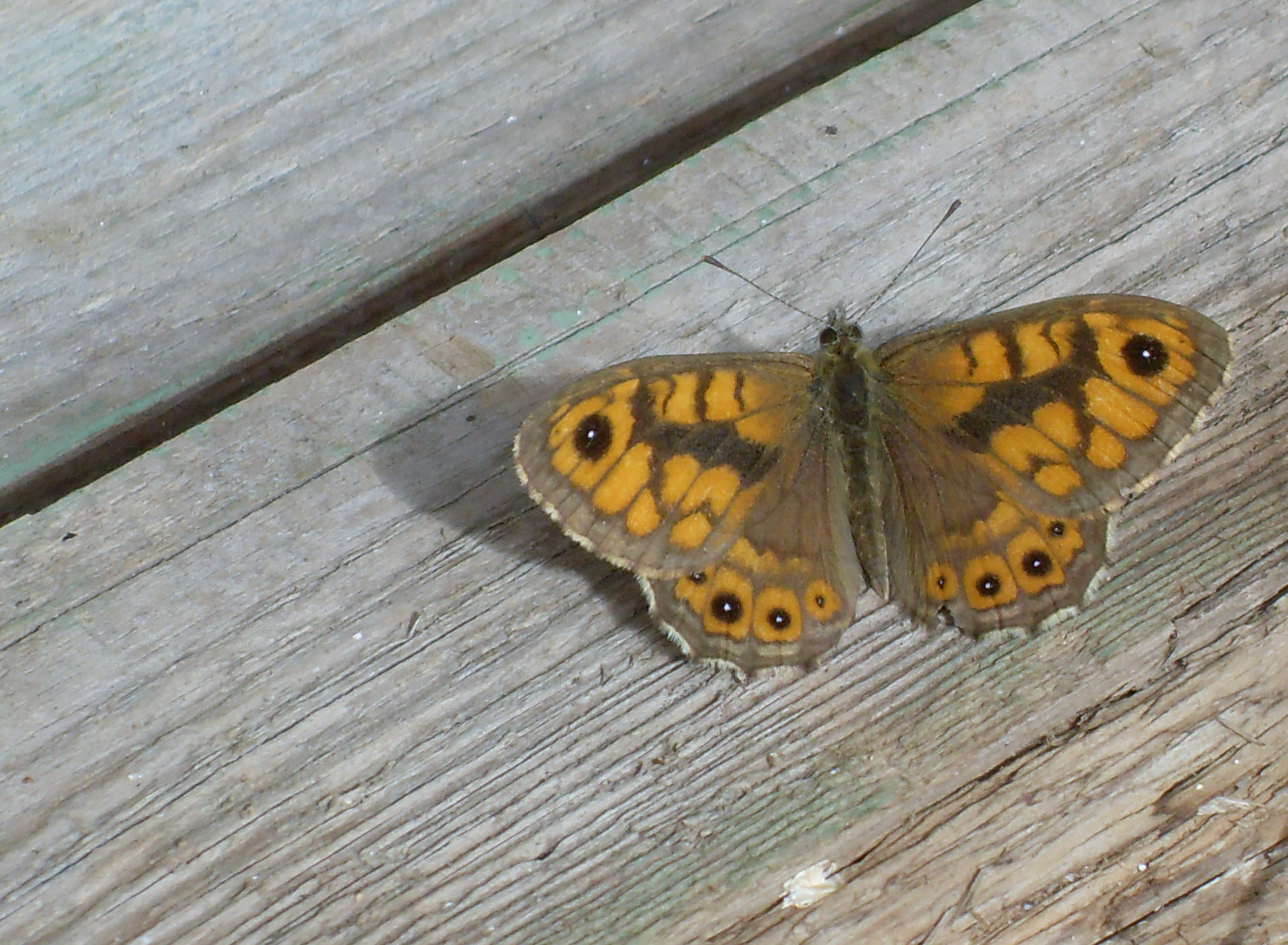
The wall brown is an inhabitant of the Heckengäu (location: Malmsheim)

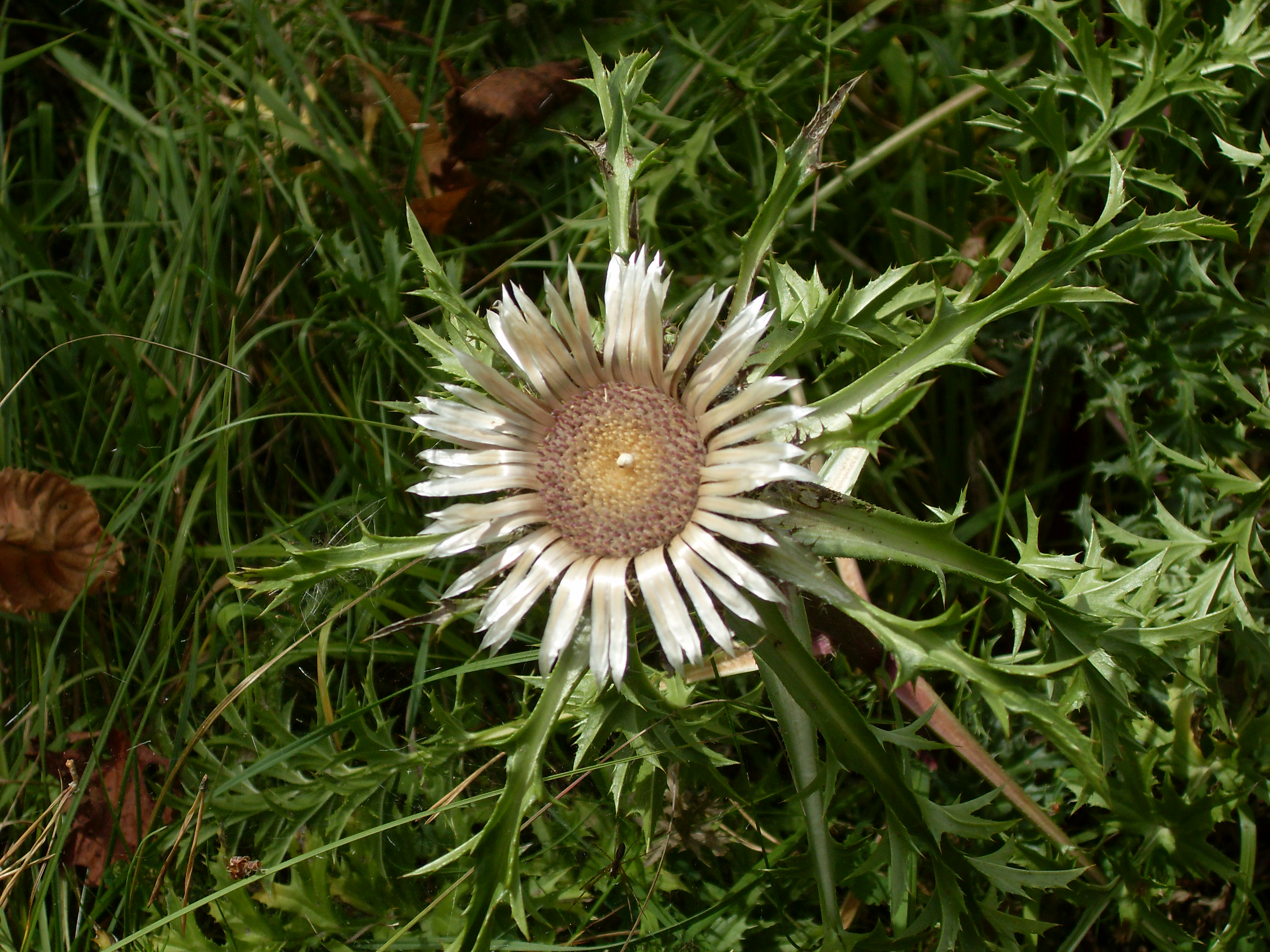
The carline thistle blooms in the Heckengäu on heathlands (location: Renningen)

== Flora and fauna ==
The Heckengäu has some valuable flora and fauna. On the juniper heaths there are colonies of stemless carline thistle and Michaelmas daisy. A few, native species of gentian also live here. In spring, the pasque flower blooms near Weil der Stadt. The wall brown occurs in the dry valleys, whilst the sand lizard finds suitable habitats in the dry stone walls on the edges of orchards. The strongly protected yellow-bellied toad seeks out the smallest ponds and puddles.

== Settlements ==
The settlements of the Heckengäu include:

- Aidlingen
- Altensteig
- Althengstett
- Aurich
- Bad Liebenzell
- Bergwald
- Calw
- Calw-Stammheim
- Dachtel
- Dätzingen
- Deckenpfronn
- Deufringen
- Döffingen
- Dürrenhardt
- Eberdingen
- Ebhausen
- Egenhausen
- Ehningen
- Enzweihingen
- Flacht
- Friolzheim
- Gärtringen
- Gechingen
- Grafenau
- Großglattbach
- Gültlingen
- Haiterbach
- Haslach
- Hausen an der Würm
- Heimsheim
- Iptingen
- Iselshausen
- Jettingen
- Kuppingen
- Lehenweiler
- Lehningen
- Leonberg
- Lomersheim
- Magstadt
- Malmsheim
- Merklingen
- Mindersbach
- Mönsheim
- Möttlingen
- Mühlacker
- Mühlhausen an der Enz
- Münklingen
- Nagold
- Neuhausen
- Nussdorf
- Ostelsheim
- Perouse
- Pinache
- Renningen
- Riet
- Rohrdorf
- Roßwag
- Rutesheim
- Schafhausen
- Schietingen
- Ober- und Unter-Schwandorf
- Serres
- Simmozheim
- Sulz am Eck
- Tiefenbronn
- Vaihingen an der Enz
- Weil der Stadt
- Weissach
- Wiernsheim
- Wildberg
- Wimsheim
- Wurmberg

== Transport ==
The Heckengäu may be reached on the A 8 and 81 motorways. In addition there are various railway links (including those on the Stuttgart S-Bahn network). There are bus connexions at the railway stations of Leonberg, Weissach (Württembergische Eisenbahngesellschaft – WEG), Mühlacker, Pforzheim, Böblingen and Weil der Stadt.
