= Haiterbach =

German municipality

- Town
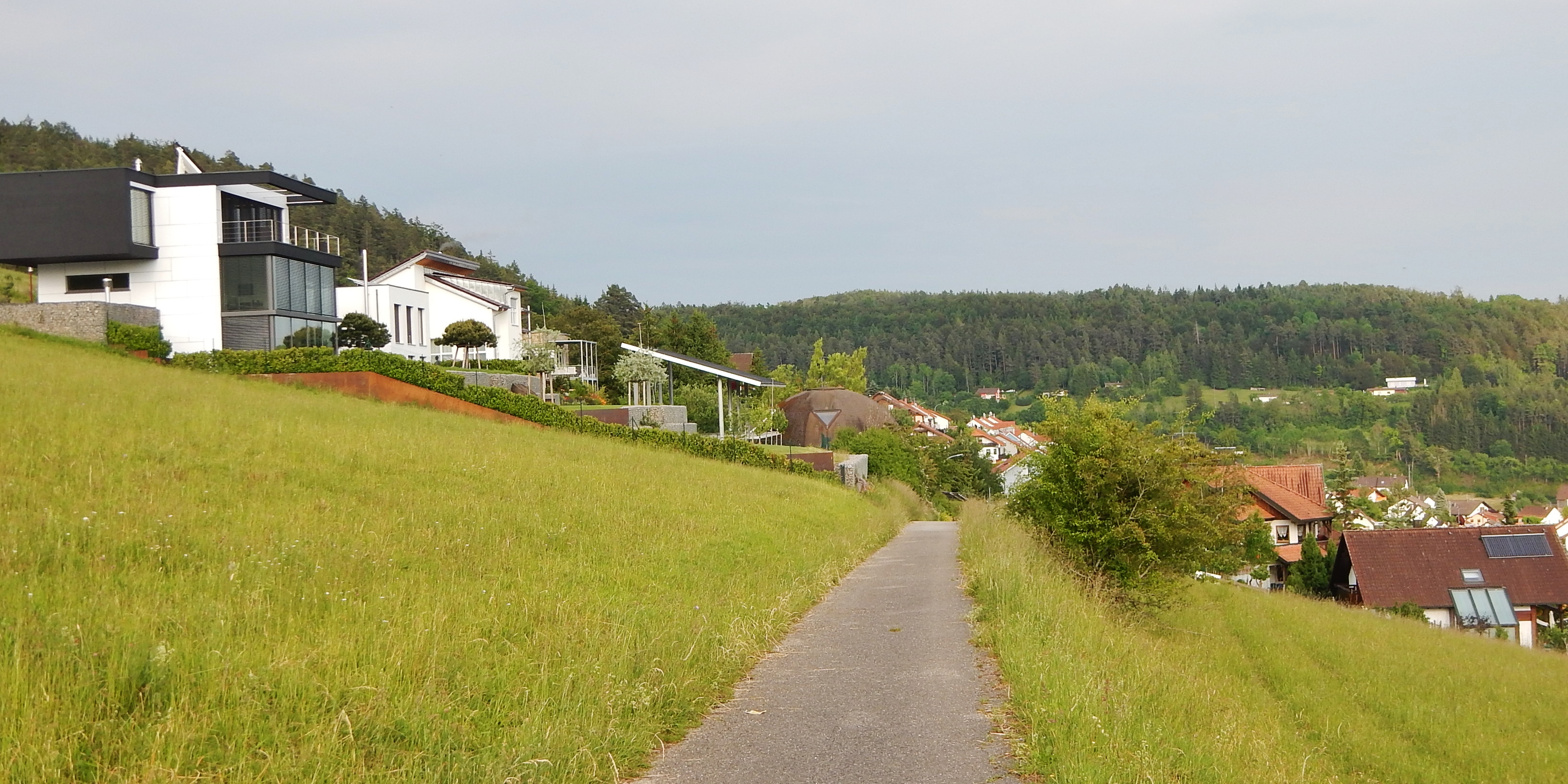
- Haiterbach, June 2014

- Coat of arms

- Location of Haiterbach within Calw district
- Interactive map of Haiterbach
- Location within Germany Location within Baden-Württemberg
- Coordinates: 48°31′28″N 8°39′1″E
- Country: Germany
- State: Baden-Württemberg
- Admin. region: Karlsruhe
- District: Calw

Area
  - Total: 28.92 km^{2} (11.17 sq mi)
- Elevation: 506 m (1,660 ft)

Population (2025-12-31)
  - Total: 5,859
  - Density: 202.6/km^{2} (524.7/sq mi)
- Time zone: UTC+01:00 (CET)
  - Summer (DST): UTC+02:00 (CEST)
- Postal codes: 72221
- Dialling codes: 07456
- Vehicle registration: CW
- Website: www.haiterbach.de

Haiterbach (German pronunciation: [ˈhaɪtɐˌbax]) is a town in the district of Calw, in Baden-Württemberg, Germany.

== History ==
Haiterbach was given its town rights by the Counts of Hohenberg in 1349. The County of Hohenberg sold Haiterbach and the villages of Beihingen and Oberschwandorf to the County of Württemberg in 1363. The three towns were assigned to the district of Nagold, which was organized as Oberamt Nagold in 1758. Unterschwandorf existed within the district of Nagold, but was not a possession of the House of Württemberg until 1805, when it was incorporated into the Knightly Canton of Neckar-Schwarzwald and thus annexed and in 1806 assigned to Oberamt Nagold. In 1938, the Oberamt was dissolved and Haiterbach, Beihingen, Oberschwandorf, and Unterschwandorf were assigned to Landkreis Calw. Beihingen and Unterschwandorf were merged into Haiterbach in 1972. Oberschwandorf was incorporated in 1975.

== Geography ==
The township (Stadt) of Haiterbach is located at the southern tip of the district of Calw, along its border with the district of Freudenstadt to the south. Haiterbach is physically located in the greater Black Forest region and the Heckengäu, with some of its municipal area lying in the Upper Gäu to the north and east. The landscape of Haiterbach's municipal area is defined by the Waldach and its tributaries. Elevation above sea level in the municipal area ranges from a high of 678 meters (2,224 ft) Normalnull (NN) to a low of 428 meters (1,404 ft) NN.

Portions of the Federally protected Haiterbacher Heckengäu, Upper Gründel, and Waldach and Haiterbach valleys nature reserves are located in Haiterbach's municipal area.

== Politics ==
Haiterbach has four boroughs (Ortsteile), Beihingen, Haiterbach, Oberschwandorf, and Unterschwandorf, and three villages, Altnuifra, Gründelhof, and Schloss Unterschwandorf. The abandoned village of Utenweiler is also located in the municipal area. Haiterbach is in a mutually-beneficial municipal association with the city of Nagold and the municipalities of Ebhausen and Rohrdorf.

=== Coat of arms ===
Haiterbach's municipal coat of arms is divided party per fess into an upper field of white and a lower field of red. In the upper field is an eagle's foot, in red; in the lower field houses a pattern of white lozenges. The lower part of the shield was the earlier pattern used by the government of Haiterbach, being used in the earliest town seals from around 1403. There is no known definite origin for the eagle's foot.

== Transportation ==
Haiterbach is connected to Germany's network of roadways by Bundesautobahn 81 and Bundesstraße 463. Local public transportation is provided by the Verkehrsgesellschaft Bäderkreis Calw.
