= Neuhausen (Enz) =

German municipality

- Municipality
- Coat of arms

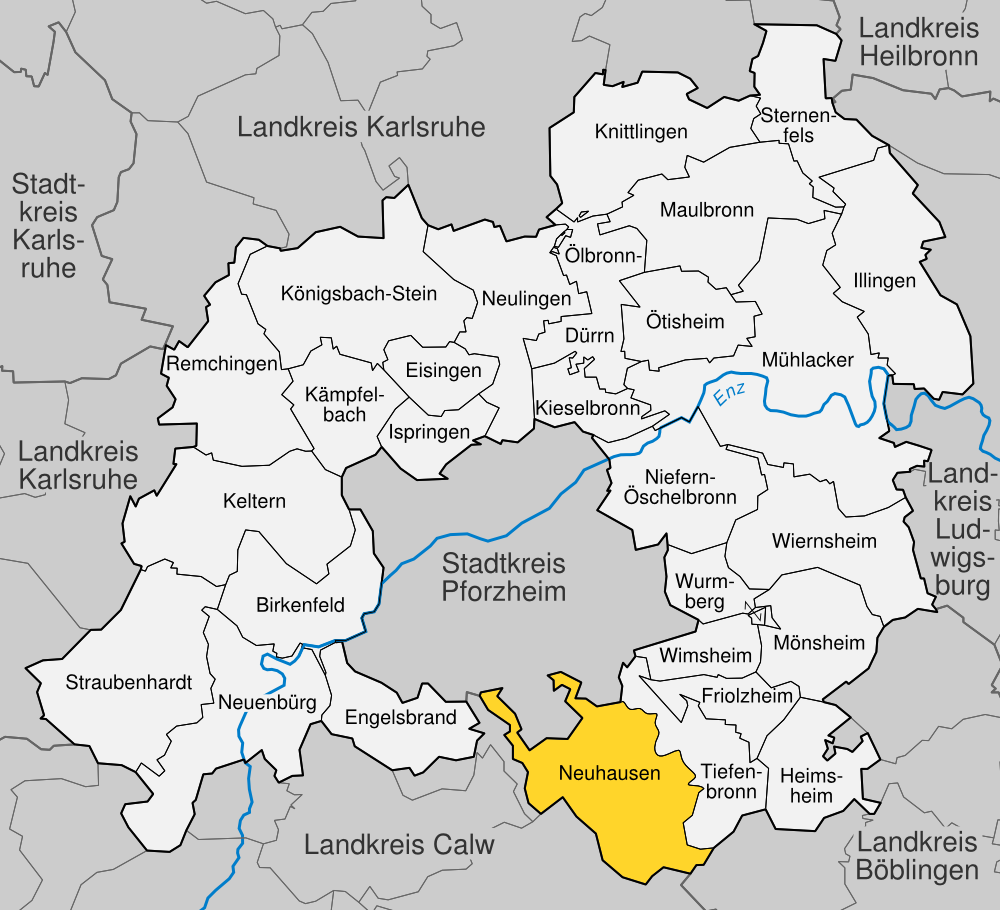
- Location of Neuhausen within Enzkreis district
- Interactive map of Neuhausen
- Location within Germany Location within Baden-Württemberg
- Coordinates: 48°47′36″N 8°46′43″E
- Country: Germany
- State: Baden-Württemberg
- Admin. region: Karlsruhe
- District: Enzkreis

Government
  - Mayor (2021–29): Sabine Wagner

Area
  - Total: 29.75 km^{2} (11.49 sq mi)
- Elevation: 482 m (1,581 ft)

Population (2025-12-31)
  - Total: 5,147
  - Density: 173.0/km^{2} (448.1/sq mi)
- Time zone: UTC+01:00 (CET)
  - Summer (DST): UTC+02:00 (CEST)
- Postal codes: 75242
- Dialling codes: 07234
- Vehicle registration: PF
- Website: www.neuhausen-enzkreis.de

Neuhausen (German pronunciation: [nɔʏˈhaʊzn̩]) is a municipality in the district of Enz in Baden-Württemberg, Germany.

== Geography ==
Neuhausen is on the plateau between Nagold and Würm, also named Biet (from German Gebiet – area), between 430 and 570 metres sea level.

=== Geology ===
The municipality is mainly built on red sandstone. A part is built on lower and middle muschelkalk.

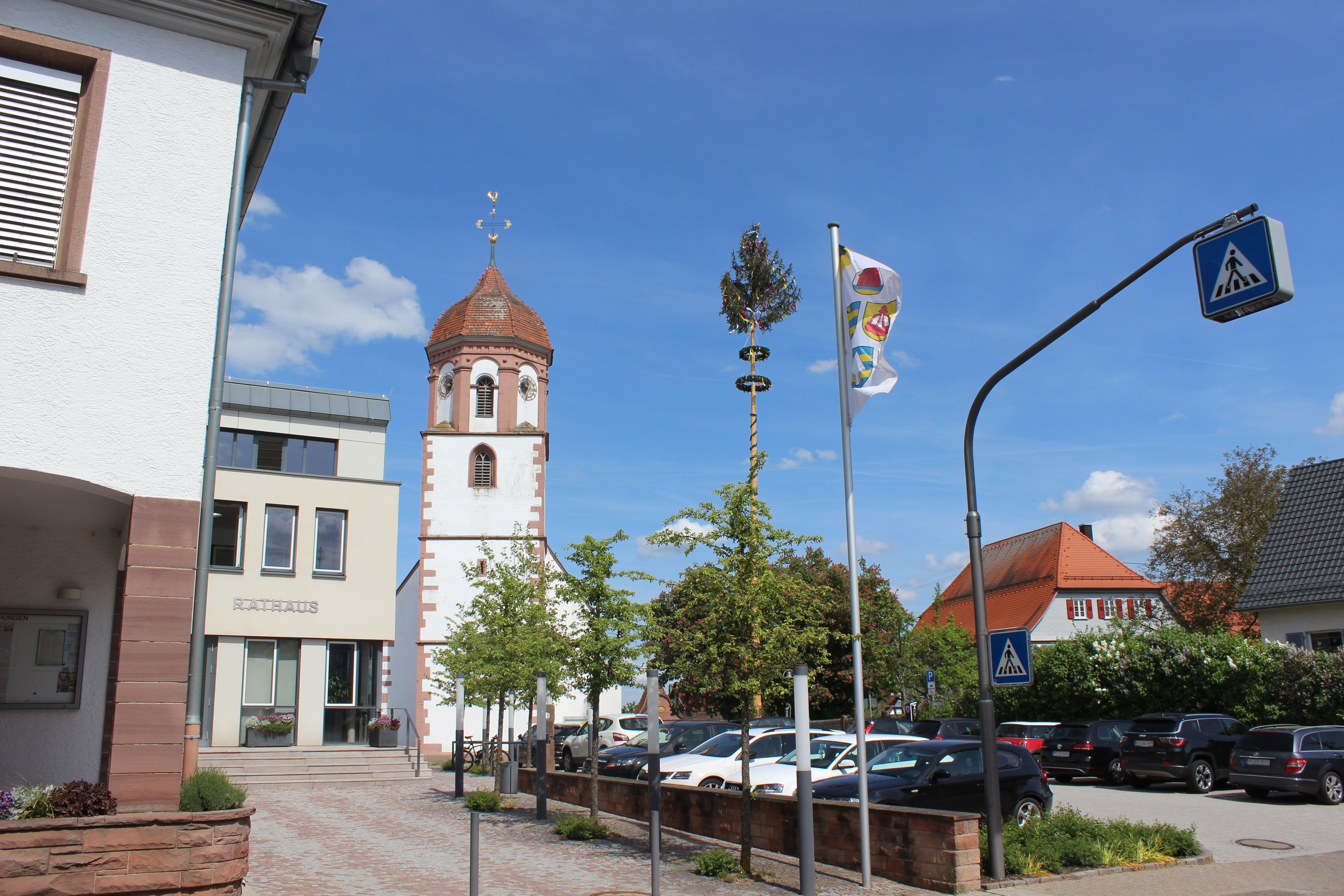
Neuhausen town hall and church

=== Municipal area expansion ===
Neuhausen and its parts extend on an area of 2976 ha, thereof are 1647, so 55%, forest.

=== Neighbour municipalities ===
Neighbour municipalities are: Bad Liebenzell, Pforzheim, Tiefenbronn, Unterreichenbach and Weil der Stadt.

=== Local subdivisions ===
The municipality of Neuhausen consists of the former municipalities Hamberg, Neuhausen, Schellbronn and Steinegg. These municipalities consisted only of the just called villages. To the former municipality belong the village Neuhausen as well as the villages "Monbachtal, Jugenderholungsheim" (youth convalescent), partially to Bad Liebenzell in the district Calw, "Monbachtal, Kurhotel" also partially to Bad Liebenzell, Bahnstation Neuhausen and St Wendel (former army barracks). In the area of the former municipality Hamberg is the department Jagschloss Taulbronnen, what was mentioned in 1568 first.

=== Climate ===
In most descriptions of villages of the Biet exists the phrase it is a landscape with harsh climate. The height plot is a case too where the location of the village is important. Who lives on an increase will live in a harsher climate as whose village is in a hollow.

== History ==
The so-called Biet-villages to them belong Neuhausen and its districts too were probably created as forest homestead villages. The first documentary evidence followed later: 1073 Schellbronn, 1150 Neuhausen and 1157 Steinegg. Hamberg was mentioned documentary in 1453 the first time, but it is probably Hamberg to have been created in the 11th century on initiative of a Stein von Rechtenstein. They were succeeded the Freiherren von Gemmingen (barons of Gemmingen).

=== War, plague and other disasters ===
The municipality was not spared by plague, war and other disasters like the other municipalities in Baden. Towards the end of World War II the villages were attacked by RAF several times. Several people died, both civilians and soldiers.

=== Religions ===
Because the Freiherren von Gemmingen lived Roman Catholic after the Reformation, built the Biet to what belongs Neuhausen a Catholic enclave in Protestant area.

== Demographics ==
Population development:

Year	Inhabitants
1990	4.597
2001	5.440
2011	5.229
2021	5.217

== Spatial development of the municipality area ==
On 1 March 1973, the municipalities Hamberg, Neuhausen and Steinegg were united as the municipality Neuhausen. On 1 January 1975, the today's community Neuhausen was built new through the union with municipality Schellbronn.
