= Hartmut Esslinger =

German-American industrial designer and inventor

- Born: Hartmut Esslinger; 5 June 1944 (age 82); Beuren (Simmersfeld), Baden-Württemberg, Germany
- Education: Hochschule für Gestaltung Schwäbisch Gmünd
- Occupation: Industrial designer
- Years active: 1969–2006
- Known for: Founder, frogdesign
- Notable work: Snow White design language
- Spouse: Patricia Roller

Hartmut Esslinger (born 5 June 1944) is a German-American industrial designer and inventor. He is best known for founding the design consultancy frog, and his work for Apple Computer in the early 1980s.

== Life and career ==
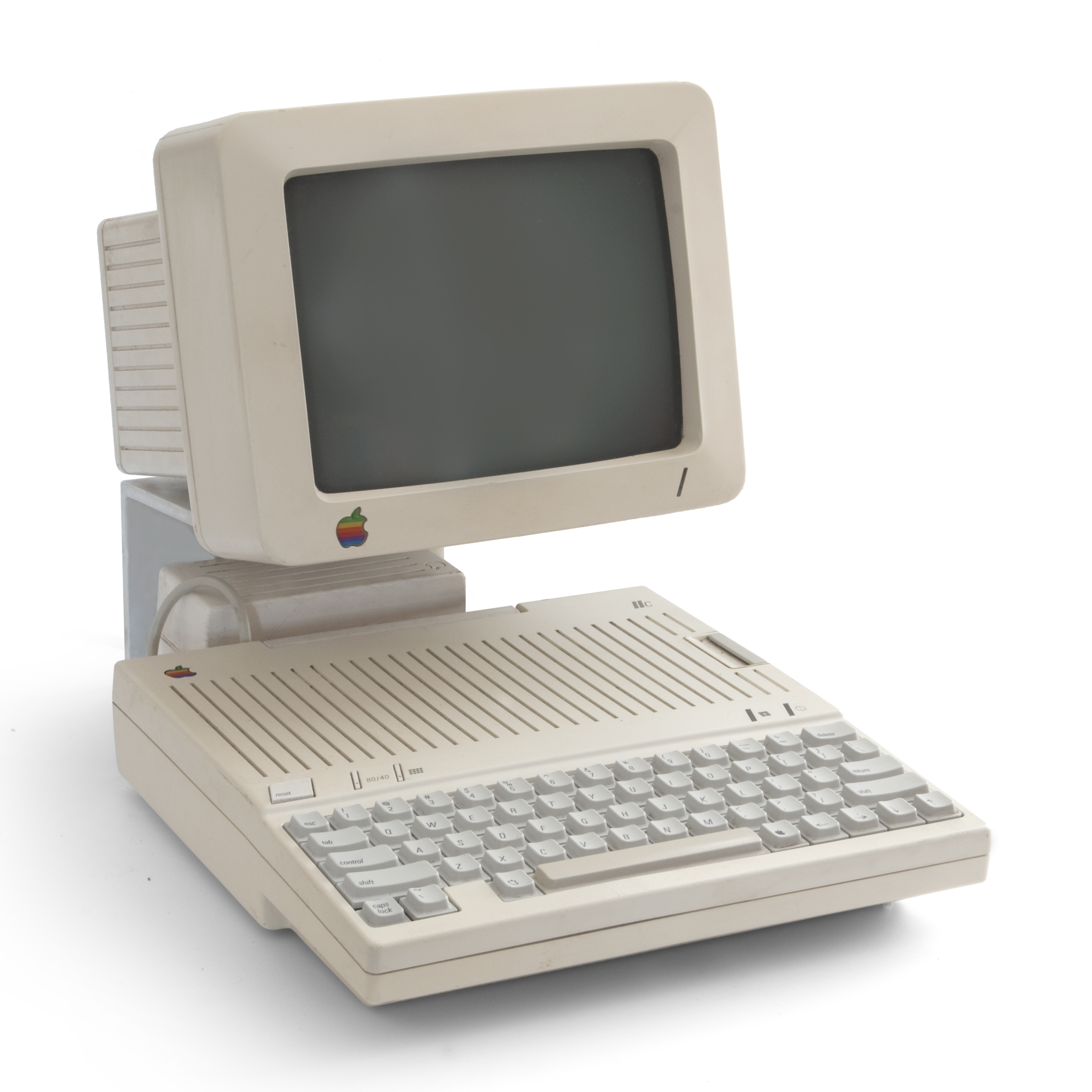
Apple IIc, the design of which was based on the Snow White design language developed by Esslinger and his team at frog

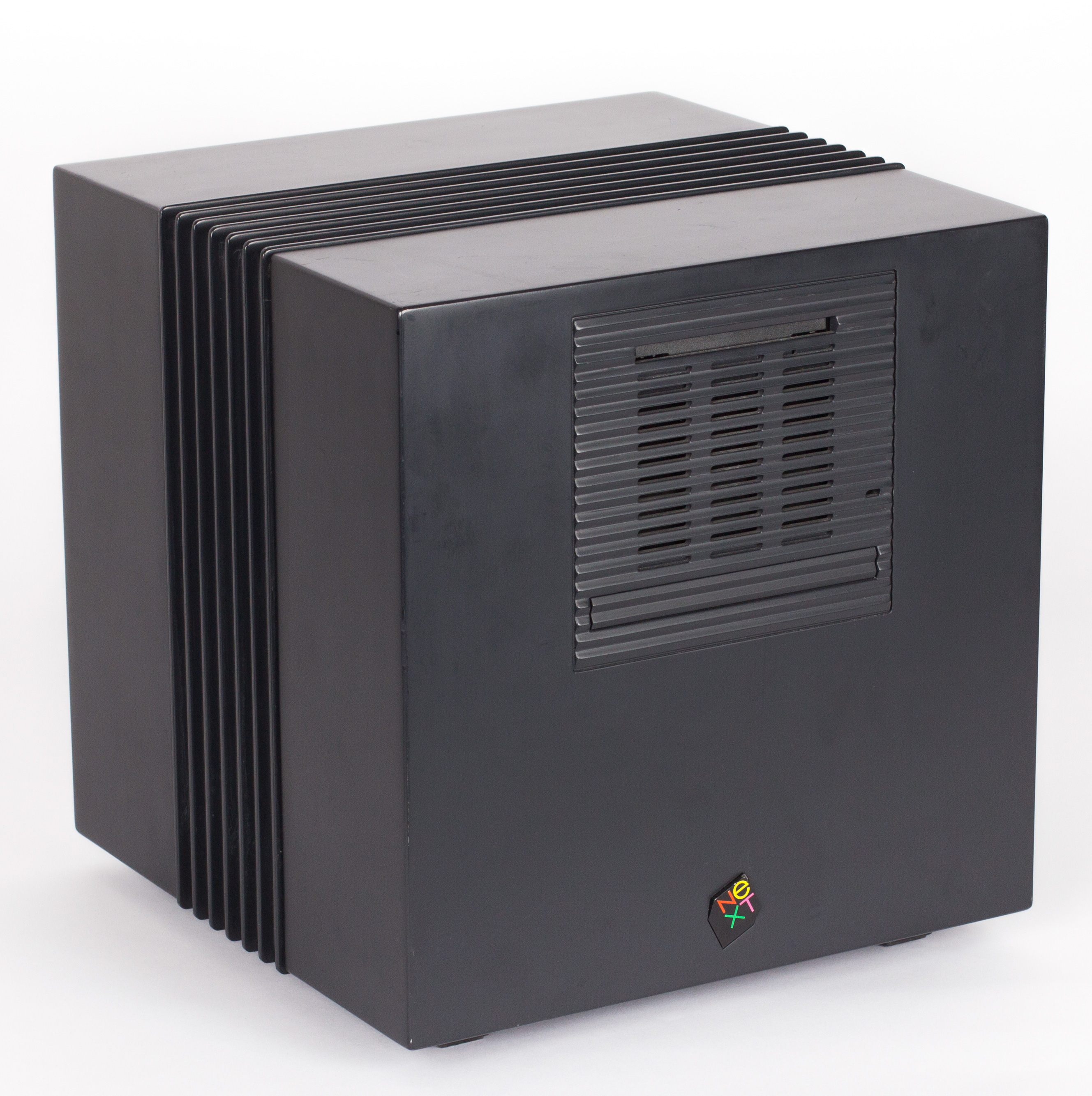
NeXTcube

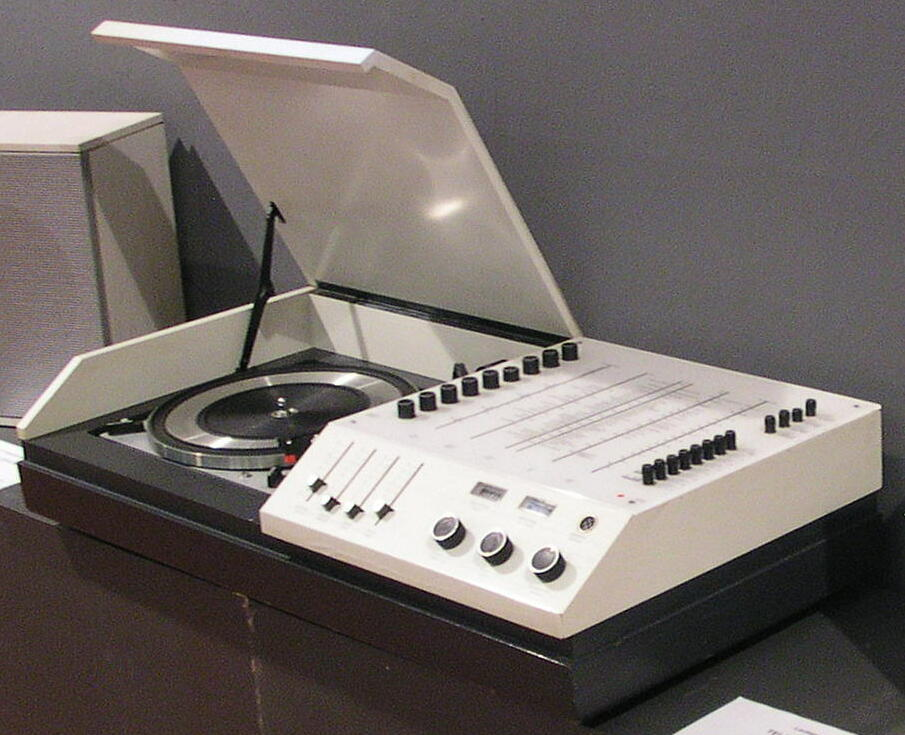
WEGA Studio 3214 Hifi

Esslinger was born in Beuren (Simmersfeld), in Germany's Black Forest. At age 25, Esslinger finished his studies at the Hochschule für Gestaltung Schwäbisch Gmünd in Schwäbisch Gmünd. After facing vicious criticism of a radio clock he designed while in school and the disapproval of his mother (who burned his sketchbooks), he started his own design agency in 1969, Esslinger Design, later renamed Frogdesign. For his first client, German avant-garde consumer electronics company Wega, he designed the first color TV without a wood frame and the Wega HiFi System 3000, which won him instant international fame. In 1974, Esslinger was hired by Sony – Sony also acquired Wega shortly after – and he helped create a global design image for Sony, especially with the Sony Trinitron and personal music products such as the Walkman. The Sony-Wega Music System Concept 51K was acquired by the Museum of Modern Art, New York. In 1976, Esslinger also worked for Louis Vuitton.

In 1982 he entered into an exclusive $2,000,000 per year contract with Apple Computer to create a design strategy which transformed Apple from a Silicon Valley startup into a global brand. Setting up shop in California for the first time, Esslinger and Frogdesign created the Snow White design language, which was applied to all Apple product lines from 1984 to 1990, starting with the Apple IIc and including the Macintosh II computer. The original Apple IIc was acquired by the Whitney Museum of Art in New York and Time voted it Design of the Year. Soon after Steve Jobs' departure, Esslinger broke his own contract with Apple and followed Jobs to NeXT. Other major client engagements include Lufthansa's global design and brand strategy, SAP's corporate identity and software user interface, Microsoft Windows branding and user interface design, Siemens, NEC, Olympus, HP, Motorola and General Electric.

In December 1990 Esslinger was featured on the cover of BusinessWeek, the only living designer thus honored since Raymond Loewy in 1934. The cover included the headline "Rebel with a cause," referencing his controversial personality and desire to be seen as a non-conformist within the field of design, as well as the movie Rebel Without a Cause, which Esslinger has described as his first American movie and a cultural inspiration.

Esslinger is a founding Professor of the Karlsruhe University of Arts and Design, Germany, and since 2006 he is a Professor for convergent industrial design at the University of Applied Arts in Vienna, Austria. In 1996, Esslinger was awarded an honorary doctorate of Fine Arts by the Parsons School of Design, New York City. Since 2012 Esslinger has served as a DeTao Master of Industrial Design with The Beijing DeTao Masters Academy (DTMA) in Shanghai, China.

In 2009 Esslinger published A Fine Line in which he explores business solutions that are environmentally sustainable and contribute to an enduring global economy.

== Notable awards and accomplishments ==
- 1969 Bundespreis Gute Form (Federal Design Award) – German Design Council
- 1991 Lucky Strike Designer Award – Raymond Loewy Foundation
- 1993 Design Team of the Year – Red Dot Design Awards
- 1996 Honorary Doctorate of Fine Arts – Parsons School of Design
- 2013 Honorary Royal Designer for Industry – Royal Society of Arts
- 2017 Lifetime Achievement Award – Cooper Hewitt National Design Awards
- 2017 World Design Medal – World Design Organization
