= Northern Black Forest Region =

Administrative unit in the Karlsruhe region Of Germany

Northern Black Forest Region Region Nordschwarzwald
- Administrative region
- Location within Germany
- Coordinates: 48°44′N 8°38′E
- Country: Germany
- State: Baden-Württemberg
- Administrative district: Karlsruhe
- Seat: Pforzheim

Government
  - Type: Administrative region
- Time zone: UTC+1 (CET)
  - Summer (DST): UTC+2 (CEST)
- ISO 3166 code: DE-BW

Northern Black Forest Region (Region Nordschwarzwald) is an administrative unit in the Karlsruhe region (Regierungsbezirk Karlsruhe) of the southwestern German state of Baden-Württemberg. Its area covers Pforzheim and the districts of Calw, Enzkreis, and Freudenstadt in the northeastern part of the Black Forest.
