= Egenhausen =

German municipality

- Municipality
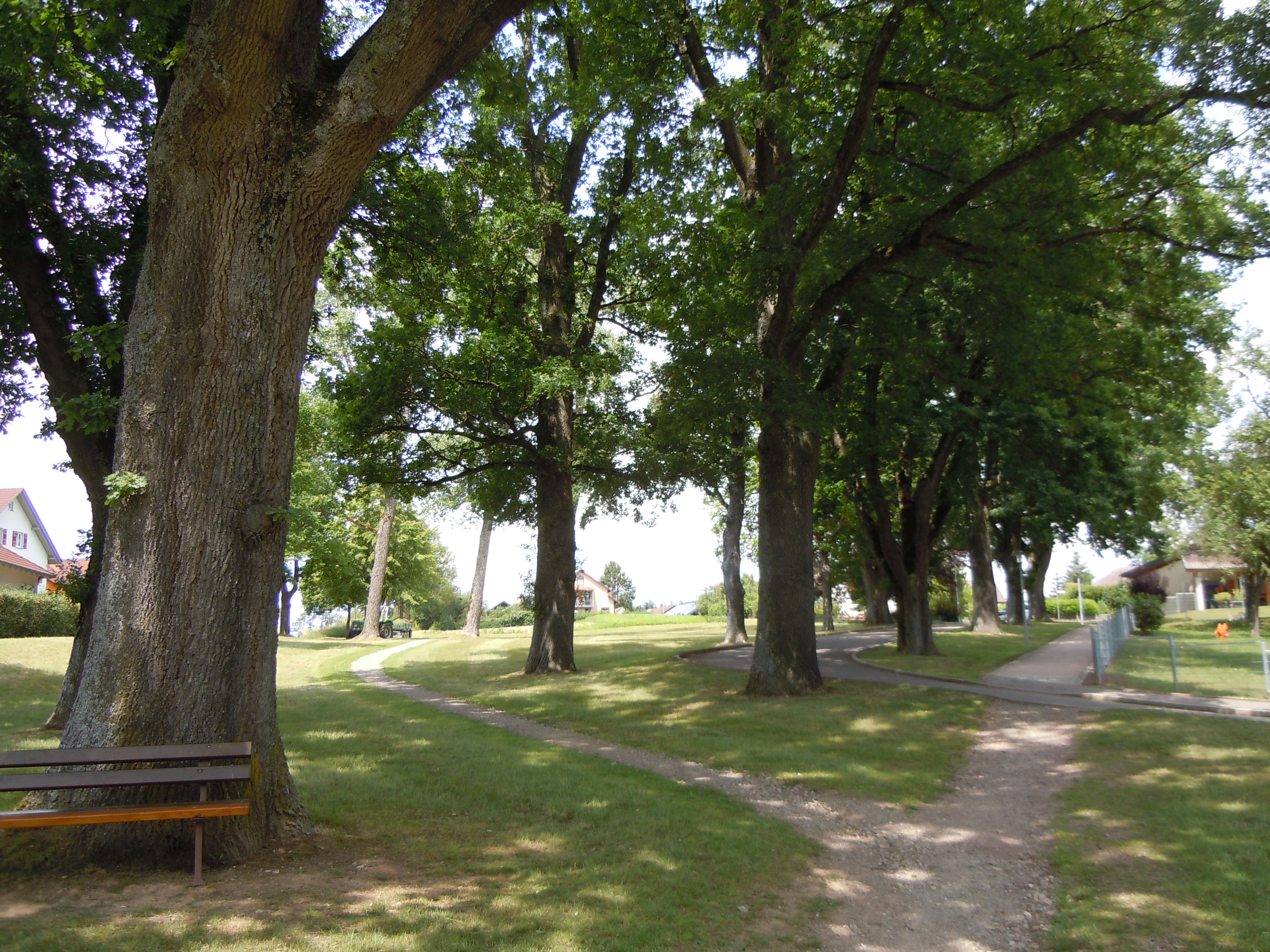
- Egenhausen oak grove

- Coat of arms

- Location of Egenhausen within Calw district
- Interactive map of Egenhausen
- Location within Germany Location within Baden-Württemberg
- Coordinates: 48°33′56″N 08°37′06″E
- Country: Germany
- State: Baden-Württemberg
- Admin. region: Karlsruhe
- District: Calw

Government
  - Mayor (2022–30): Sven Holder

Area
  - Total: 10.02 km^{2} (3.87 sq mi)
- Elevation: 535 m (1,755 ft)

Population (2025-12-31)
  - Total: 2,090
  - Density: 209/km^{2} (540/sq mi)
- Time zone: UTC+01:00 (CET)
  - Summer (DST): UTC+02:00 (CEST)
- Postal codes: 72227
- Dialling codes: 07453
- Vehicle registration: CW
- Website: www.egenhausen.de

Egenhausen (German pronunciation: [eːɡn̩ˈhaʊzn̩]) is a municipality in the district of Calw in Baden-Württemberg in Germany.

== History ==
The villages of Egenhausen, Kapf, and Ölmühle were sold to the Duchy of Württemberg by the Margraviate of Baden in 1603. The three were governed from Altensteig until 1811, when they were assigned to Oberamt Nagold. The Oberamt was dissolved in 1938 and Egenhausen, Kapf, and Ölmühle were subsequently assigned to the new Landkreis Calw. Egenhausen began a period of urban growth after World War II and had developed two new neighborhoods at its northern and western extremities by the mid-1960s.

== Geography ==
The municipality (Gemeinde) of Egenhausen is located at the south-western edge of the district of Calw, in the German state of Baden-Württemberg. It lies along the border with the district of Freudenstadt to the south and west. Egenhausen is located in a transitional landscape between the Black Forest, the Heckengäu, and the Upper Gäu. Elevation above sea level in the municipal area ranges from a high of 626 meters (2,054 ft) Normalnull (NN) to a low of 458 meters (1,503 ft) NN.

Portions of the Federally protected Egenhäuser Kapf at Bömbachtal and Upper Gründel nature reserves are located in Egenhausen's municipal area.

== Politics ==
Egenhausen has one borough (Ortsteil), Egenhausen, and two villages: Kapf and Ölmühle. There is also an abandoned village, Sindelsteta, in the municipal area. Egenhausen is a member of the Altensteig Municipal Association with the city of Altensteig and the municipality of Simmersfeld.

=== Coat of arms ===
Egenhausen's coat of arms portrays a thistle, in yellow a white flower and six yellow leaves, rooted to a field of red. The thistle is a reference to the flora of the Heckengäu. This coat of arms was awarded to Egenhausen by the Federal Ministry of the Interior alongside a municipal flag on 10 April 1969.

== Transportation ==
Egenhausen is connected to Germany's network of roadways by Bundesstraße 28. Local public transportation is provided by the Verkehrsgesellschaft Bäderkreis Calw.
