= Neuweiler =

German municipality

- Municipality
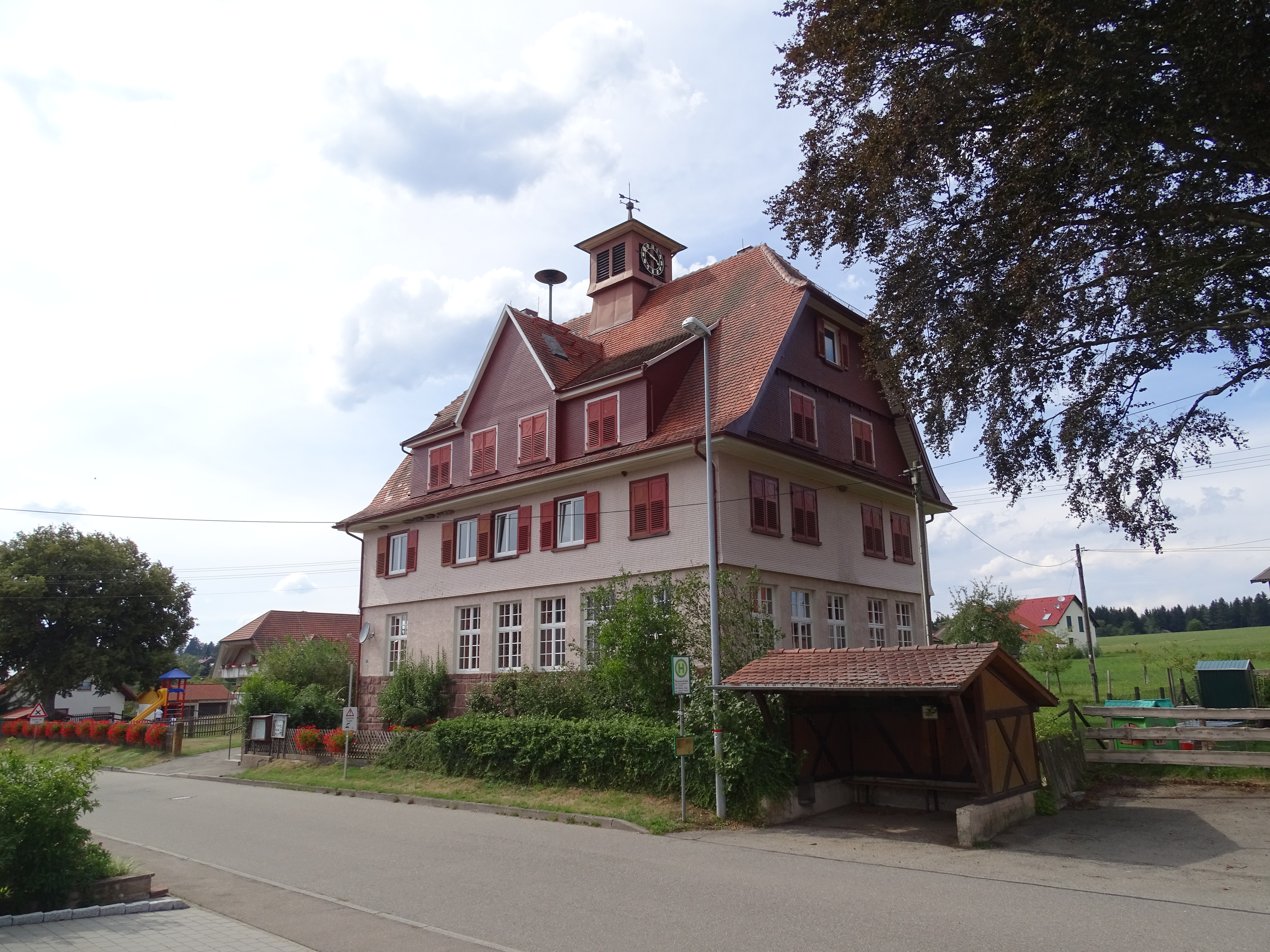
- School in Agenbach, now community building

- Coat of arms

- Location of Neuweiler within Calw district
- Interactive map of Neuweiler
- Location within Germany Location within Baden-Württemberg
- Coordinates: 48°39′29″N 8°35′53″E
- Country: Germany
- State: Baden-Württemberg
- Admin. region: Karlsruhe
- District: Calw

Government
  - Mayor (2023–31): Martin Buchwald (CDU)

Area
  - Total: 51.29 km^{2} (19.80 sq mi)
- Elevation: 642 m (2,106 ft)

Population (2025-12-31)
  - Total: 3,120
  - Density: 60.8/km^{2} (158/sq mi)
- Time zone: UTC+01:00 (CET)
  - Summer (DST): UTC+02:00 (CEST)
- Postal codes: 75389
- Dialling codes: 07055
- Vehicle registration: CW
- Website: www.neuweiler.de

Neuweiler (German pronunciation: [ˈnɔʏvaɪlɐ]) is a municipality of the Calw district and region of Karlsruhe of Baden-Württemberg, Germany.

== History ==
The municipality of Neuweiler was formed in 1975 by the merging of the towns of Agenbach, Breitenberg, Gaugenwald, Neuweiler, Oberkollwangen, and Zwerenberg

== Geography ==
The municipality (Gemeinde) of Neuweiler is located at the center of the district of Calw, in the German state of Baden-Württemberg. Neuweiler is physically located upon the plateaus and in the valleys of the Enz and Nagold in the Black Forest, though portions of its municipal area fall into the Grinde. Elevation above sea level in the municipal area ranges from a high of 764 meters (2,507 ft) Normalnull (NN) to a low of 439 meters (1,440 ft) NN.

Portions of the Federally protected Falchenwiesen and Köllbach valley nature reserves are located in Neuweiler's municipal area.

== Demographics ==
Population development:

Year	Inhabitants
1990	2,709
2001	3,150
2011	3,122
2021	3,198

== Politics ==
Neuweiler has six boroughs (Ortsteile) – Agenbach, Breitenberg, Gaugenwald, Neuweiler, Oberkollwangen, Zwerenberg – and five villages: Agenbacher Sägmühle, Dachshof, Glasmühle, Hofstett, Weikenmühle. The industrial zone of Aisbach is also found in the municipal area. Neuweiler is a member of the Teinachtal Municipal Association with the cities of Bad Teinach-Zavelstein and Neubulach.

=== Coat of arms ===
Neuweiler's municipal coat of arms shows a bugle, in black, with silver fittings and a red carry strap upon a field of yellow. The bugle is taken from the arms of the House of Hornberg, the oldest local noble family, and also references the hunting lodge maintained in Neuweiler by the Dukes of Württemberg. The overall black-yellow tincture is taken from Württemberg's coat of arms. This coat of arms was created in 1935 on the suggestion of the Central State Archive Stuttgart and was approved for use by the Federal Ministry of the Interior on 4 July 1967. When the municipality of Neuweiler was formed in 1975, Neuweiler's arms were retained for municipal use and were approved for that role by the Calw district office on 22 November 1976. A municipal flag was also issued to Neuweiler on that date.

== Transportation ==
Neuweiler is connected to Germany's network of roadways by Bundesstraße 294. Local public transportation is provided by the Verkehrsgesellschaft Bäderkreis Calw.
