= Deufringen =

- Ortsteil of Aidlingen
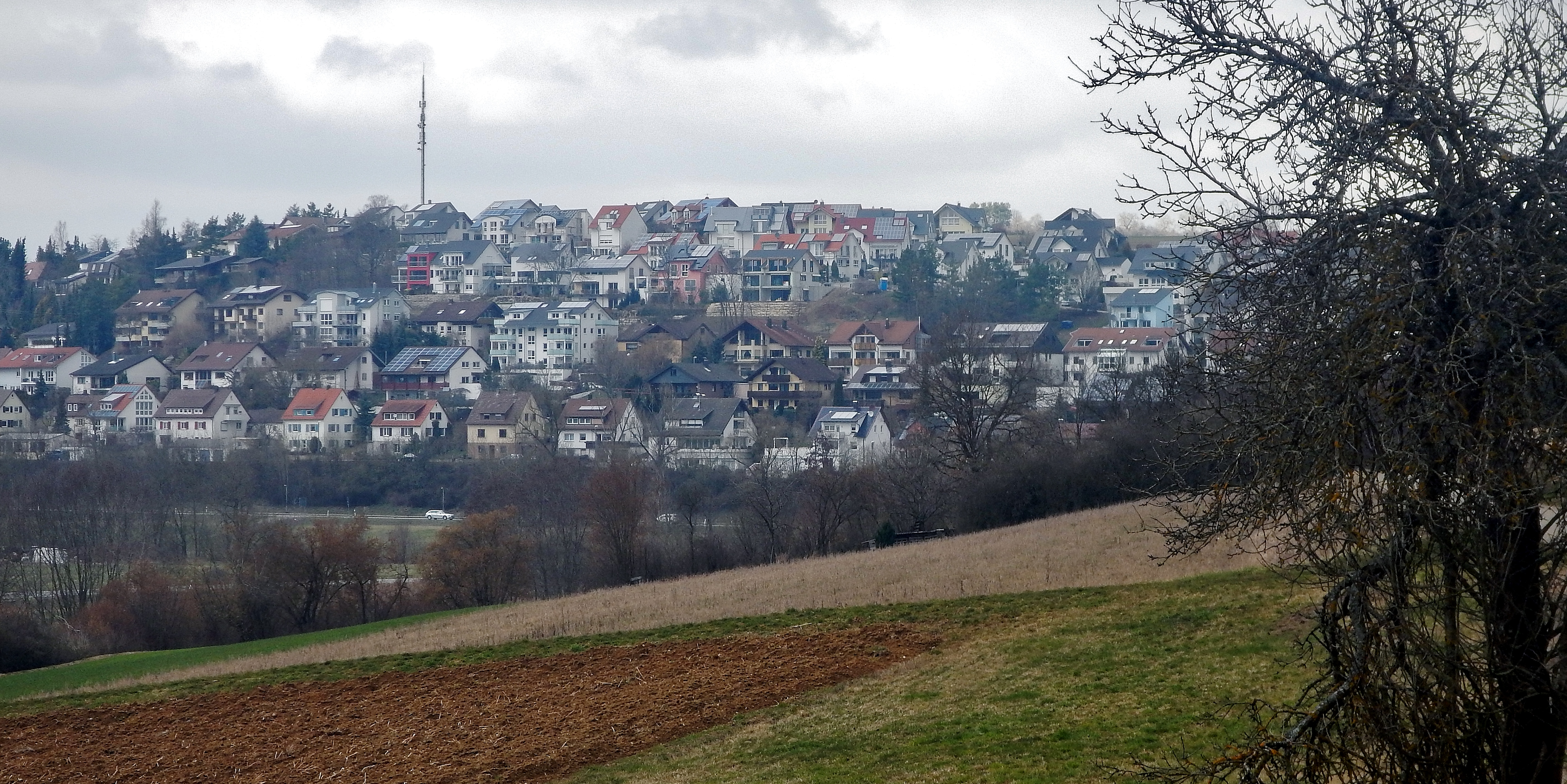

- Coat of arms
- Interactive map of Deufringen
- Location within Germany Location within Baden-Württemberg
- Coordinates: 48°40′55″N 8°52′5″E
- Country: Germany
- State: Baden-Württemberg
- Admin. region: Stuttgart
- District: Böblingen
- Municipality: Aidlingen
- Elevation: 447 m (1,467 ft)

Population (2018-12-31)
  - Total: 1,976
- Time zone: UTC+01:00 (CET)
  - Summer (DST): UTC+02:00 (CEST)
- Postal codes: 71134
- Dialling codes: 07056

Deufringen is a village in the German district of Böblingen in the state of Baden-Württemberg. It is located in the Heckengäu area between the Black Forest and Stuttgart. The distance to the larger cities Böblingen, Sindelfingen and Calw is around twelve kilometres. Other towns of importance in the surroundings are Herrenberg (eleven kilometres away) and Weil der Stadt (ten kilometres away).

== Topography ==
Deufringen's topography is diverse and encompasses fairly bare landscape of the so-called Heckengäu in the north, covered with bushes, as well as a large forested area in the southern part of the municipality. This Nächste Wald ("Nearest Wood") is situated on the southern edge of the valley in direction of Gechingen. In the south, it is bordered by the sports grounds of local sports club, FSV Deufringen, and the country road to Gechingen-Bergwald.
