= Klauß =

Klauß is a German language surname and a variant of Klaus. It stems from a reduced form of the male given name Nicholas. Notable people with the name include:

- Dieter Klauß (1947–2010), German field hockey player
- Gauthier Klauss (born 1987), former French slalom canoeist
- Kristoffer Klauß (born 1988), German rapper
- Max Klauß (born 1947), retired East German long jumper
- Michael Klauß (footballer, born 1970), German former professional footballer
- Michael Klauß (footballer, born 1987), German footballer
- Miguel Klauß (born 1986), German politician
- Natasha Klauss (born 1975), Colombian actress
- Klauss (footballer) (born 1997), João Klauss de Mello, Brazilian footballer
