= Simmersfeld =

German municipality

- Municipality
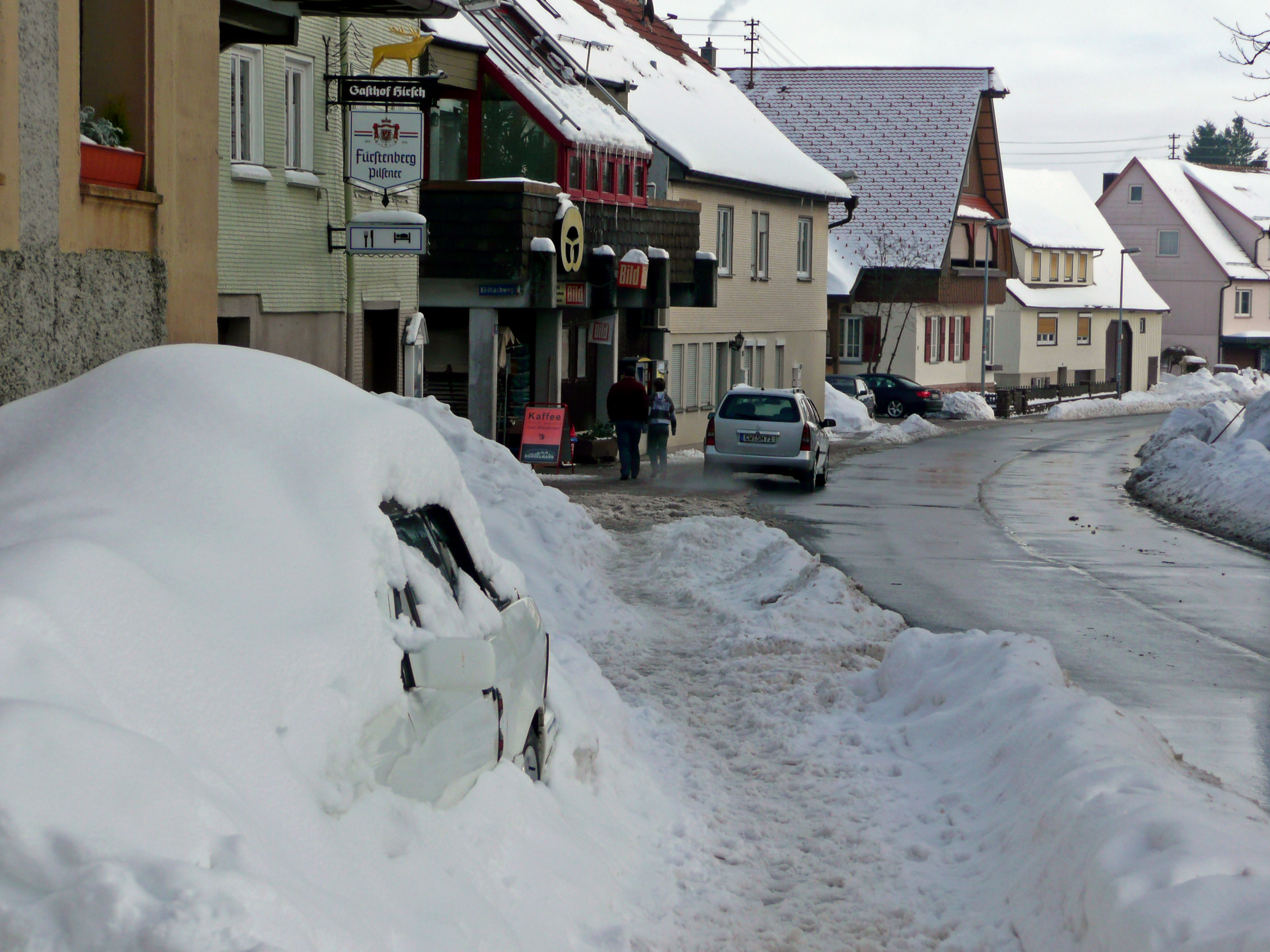
- Simmersfeld, December 2010

- Coat of arms

- Location of Simmersfeld within Calw district
- Interactive map of Simmersfeld
- Location within Germany Location within Baden-Württemberg
- Coordinates: 48°37′21″N 8°30′40″E
- Country: Germany
- State: Baden-Württemberg
- Admin. region: Karlsruhe
- District: Calw

Area
  - Total: 44.16 km^{2} (17.05 sq mi)
- Elevation: 764 m (2,507 ft)

Population (2025-12-31)
  - Total: 2,189
  - Density: 49.57/km^{2} (128.4/sq mi)
- Time zone: UTC+01:00 (CET)
  - Summer (DST): UTC+02:00 (CEST)
- Postal codes: 72226
- Dialling codes: 07484
- Vehicle registration: CW
- Website: www.simmersfeld.de

Simmersfeld (German pronunciation: [ˈzɪmɐsfɛlt]) is a municipality in the district of Calw in Baden-Württemberg in Germany.

== History ==
The village of Aichhalden was acquired in 1345 by the County of Württemberg and was assigned to the district of Neuweiler, then to that of Calw in the early 16th century. Simmersfeld, Beuren, and Ettmannsweiler were manorial estates of the township of Altensteig, which became a possession of the now-Duchy of Württemberg in 1603 and made the seat of its own district. Fünfbronn came into Württemberger possession in the around 1464 after buying its independence from All Saints' Abbey and was assigned to the district of Neuenbürg. In the first decade of the 19th century, the administrative structure of the newly created Kingdom of Württemberg was reformed and its districts recreated as Oberämter; Neuweiler was made an Oberamt in 1808, but then in 1810 dissolved, resulting in Simmersfeld, Beuren, and Ettmannsweiler being assigned to Oberamt Nagold. Fünfbronn was reassigned from Oberamt Neuenbürg in 1806 to Oberamt Calw, then to Oberamt Nagold in 1812. In the district reforms of 1938, Aichhalden, Beuren, Ettmannsweiler, Fünfbronn, and Simmersfeld were all brought together under Landkreis Calw. In 1975, they merged into a single municipality.

== Geography ==
The municipality (Gemeinde) of Simmersfeld is located at the south-western edge of the district of Calw, in the German state of Baden-Württemberg. It lies along the border with the district of Freudenstadt to the south and west. The municipal area lies within the greater Black Forest region, stretching from the upper valley of the Kleine Enz in the north to the Nagold in the south. A portion of Simmersfeld's area lies in the Grinde to the north. Elevation above sea level in the municipal area ranges from a high of 874 meters (2,867 ft) Normalnull (NN), in the Enzwald, to a low of 465 meters (1,526 ft) NN.

A portion of the federally protected Köllbach valley nature reserve is located in Simmersfeld's municipal area.

== Politics ==
Simmersfeld has five boroughs (Ortsteile) – Aichhalden, Beuren, Ettmannsweiler, Fünfbronn, and Simmersfeld – and two villages: Neumühle and Oberweiler. The abandoned village of Moosberg is also located in the municipal area.

=== Coat of arms ===
The Simmersfeld municipal coat of arms displays a wood grouse, in yellow, upon a yellow branch above a crossed sword and axe, also yellow, upon a field of red. The axe and grouse reference the forested character of the municipality, and the sword to Simmersfeld's original name, "Sigmaresfelt". This pattern was first created in 1930 as the coat of arms of the village of Simmersfeld and was adopted as such in 1957. The symbology upon the blazon was deemed applicable to the whole municipality once it was formed in 1975 and was retained. The Calw district office approved it and issued a corresponding municipal flag on 5 May 1982.

== Transportation ==
Simmersfeld is connected to Germany's network of roadways by its local Landesstraßen und Kreisstraßen. Local public transportation is provided by the Verkehrsgesellschaft Bäderkreis Calw.
