= Neubulach =

German municipality

- Town
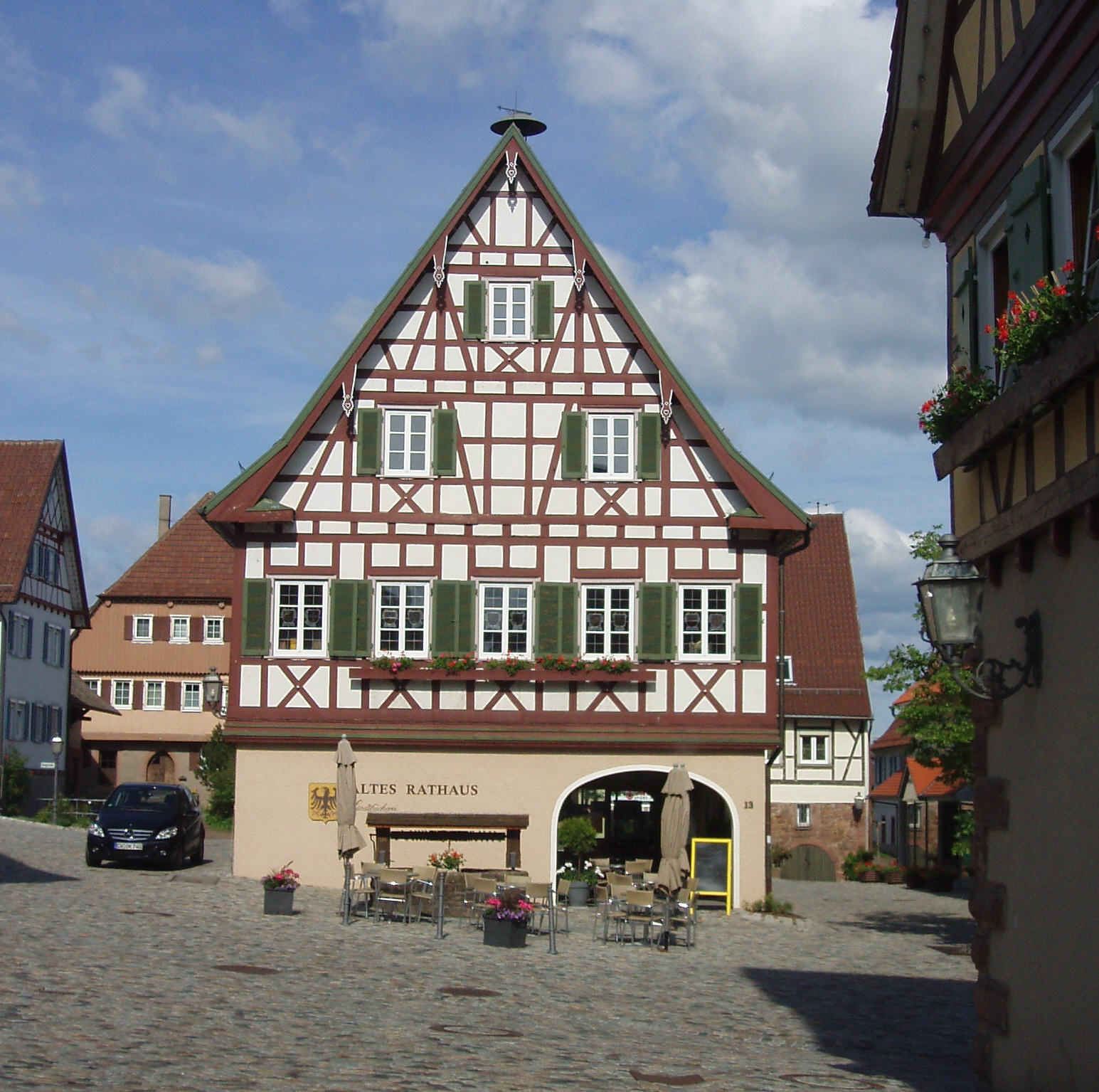
- Old town hall, Neubulach

- Coat of arms

- Location of Neubulach within Calw district
- Interactive map of Neubulach
- Location within Germany Location within Baden-Württemberg
- Coordinates: 48°39′40″N 8°41′48″E
- Country: Germany
- State: Baden-Württemberg
- Admin. region: Karlsruhe
- District: Calw

Government
  - Mayor (2022–30): Petra Schupp (CDU)

Area
  - Total: 24.69 km^{2} (9.53 sq mi)
- Elevation: 584 m (1,916 ft)

Population (2025-12-31)
  - Total: 5,676
  - Density: 229.9/km^{2} (595.4/sq mi)
- Time zone: UTC+01:00 (CET)
  - Summer (DST): UTC+02:00 (CEST)
- Postal codes: 75386–75387
- Dialling codes: 07053
- Vehicle registration: CW
- Website: www.neubulach.de

Neubulach (German pronunciation: [nɔʏˈbuːlax]) is a town in the district of Calw, in Baden-Württemberg, Germany.

== History ==
Neubulach was probably founded in the late 13th century by the Count of Hohenberg, who possessed the bergregal over local silver mining. The earliest document to refer to Neubulach comes from 1300, and it refers to Neubulach as a town (Stadt).

== Geography ==
The township (Stadt) of Neubulach is located at the center of the district of Calw, in Baden-Württemberg, one of the 16 States of the Federal Republic of Germany. Neubulach's municipal area stretches over the plateau of the Enz and Nagold river valleys, between those of the Teinach to the north and the Zingelbach to the south. Elevation above sea level in the municipal area ranges from a high of 661 meters (2,169 ft) Normalnull (NN) to a low of 342 meters (1,122 ft) NN.

== Politics ==
Neubulach has five boroughs (Ortsteil) – Altbulach, Liebelsberg, Martinsmoos, Neubulach, and Oberhaugstett – and eight villages: Elektrizitätswerk, Kohlerstal, Lautenbachhof, Lochsägmühle, Marmorwerk, Seitzental, Talmühle, and Teinachtal.

=== Coat of arms ===
Neubulach's municipal coat of arms an eagle, in black, with red feet and beak and wearing a red crown, upon a field of yellow. Over the eagle's chest is a small blazon with a white field with crossed hammer and pick, both red. The crowned eagle is a motif that has been associated with Neubulach since its foundation, first appearing in the 1300 document and then again in 1535. This was the coat of arms of Neubulach until 1975, when the blazon upon the eagle's chest was added to reference the town's mining history. This coat of arms was awarded to Neubulach along with a municipal flag by the Calw district office on 19 November 1976.

== Transportation ==
Neubulach is connected to Germany's network of roadways by Bundesstraße 463 and to its system of railways by the Nagold Valley Railway. Local public transportation is provided by the Verkehrsgesellschaft Bäderkreis Calw.
