= Unterreichenbach =

- Municipality
- Coat of arms

- Location of Unterreichenbach within Calw district
- Interactive map of Unterreichenbach
- Location within Germany Location within Baden-Württemberg
- Coordinates: 48°49′32″N 8°42′38″E
- Country: Germany
- State: Baden-Württemberg
- Admin. region: Karlsruhe
- District: Calw
- Subdivisions: 3

Government
  - Mayor (2024–2032): Lukas Klingenberg

Area
  - Total: 6.30 km^{2} (2.43 sq mi)
- Elevation: 328 m (1,076 ft)

Population (2025-12-31)
  - Total: 2,430
  - Density: 386/km^{2} (999/sq mi)
- Time zone: UTC+01:00 (CET)
  - Summer (DST): UTC+02:00 (CEST)
- Postal codes: 75399
- Dialling codes: 07235
- Vehicle registration: CW
- Website: www.unterreichenbach.de

Unterreichenbach is a municipality in the district of Calw in the Northern Black Forest in Baden-Württemberg in Germany.

== Geography ==
Unterreichenbach is in the Nagold River Valley between Calw and Pforzheim, at an altitude of between 292 und 633 metres.

=== Subdivisions ===
Unterreichenbach includes the settlement of Dennjächt as well as Kapfenhardt, which until 1971 was a distinct locality comprising the village of Kapfenhardt and the hamlet of Obere Mühle around the upper mill, which has been in operation since the 14th century. Jagdhütte was delisted as a hamlet in 1971.

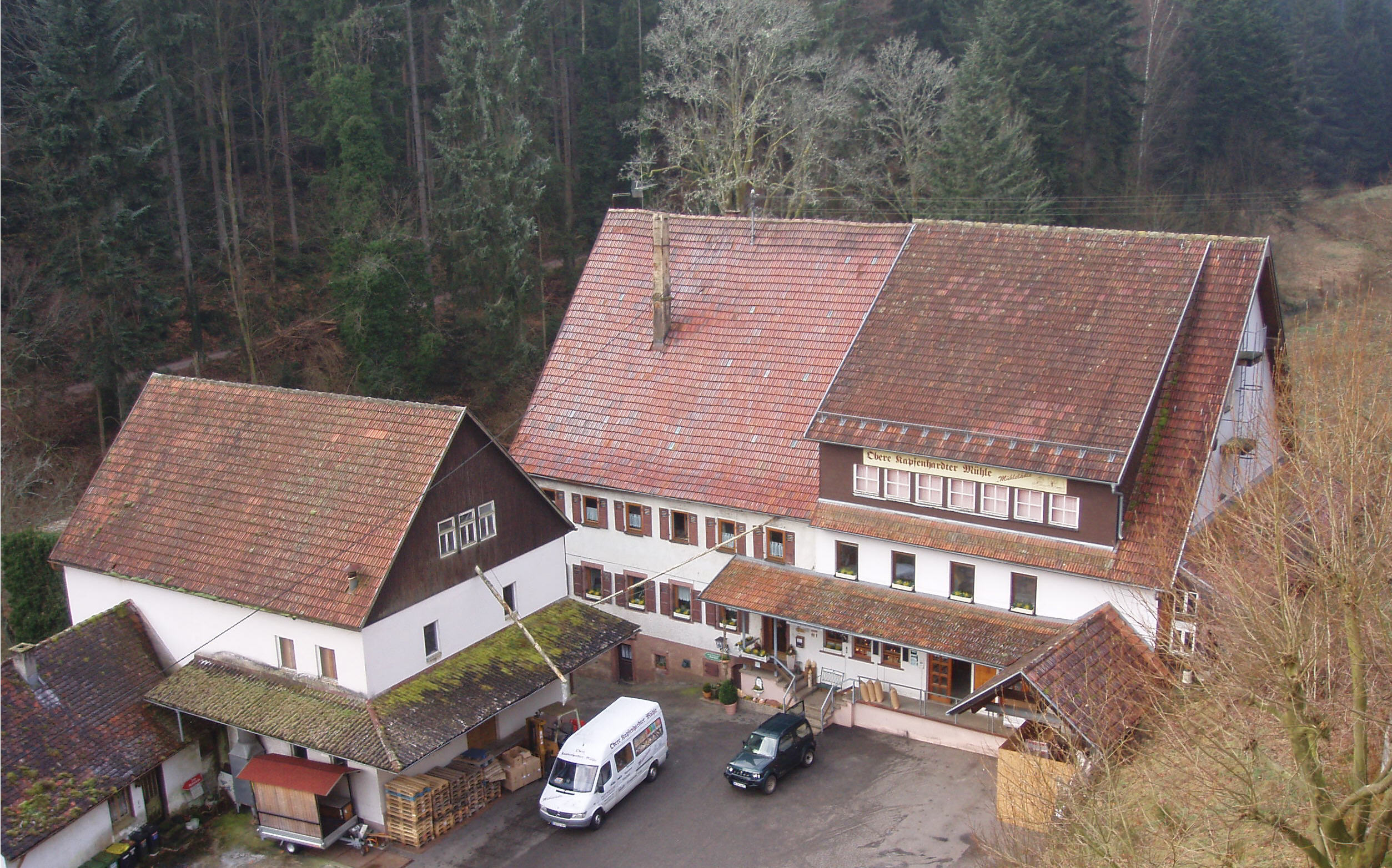
Obere Mühle (upper mill) at Kapfenhardt

== History ==
The first preserved mention of Unterreichenbach dates to 1375, but there is evidence of a church as early as 1250, and there may have been a settlement as early as 800. The locality was formerly a possession of the Counts of Calw, but in 1603 passed to Württemberg. The first preserved mention of Kapfenhardt, today part of Unterreichenbach, dates to 1260, and it had passed to Württemberg in the early 14th century.

Unterreichenbach became an important centre of timber rafting on the Enz, Nagold and Würm after the Pforzheim rafting colony of Au burnt down in the 14th century and many families moved to Unterreichenbach. Felled trees floated down from the Kohler Valley upstream of Calw were reassembled while the men overnighted in inns at the mills in Kapfenhardt and then floated them on, usually to Bietigheim or Heidelberg but sometimes as far as Rotterdam, before returning overland with their pay. The rafting era came to an end in the early 20th century, replaced by the railways. The community has a museum and a monument to the industry.

Beginning in the 14th century, the area was an increasingly popular spa, but this ended with a mid-19th-century avalanche which shut off the Gutenbrunnen hot spring. However, the area continued to attract tourists, and the mill inns had developed into internationally famous hotels by the Second World War.

=== Religion ===
Reichenbach became a parish in 1527. The Reformation reached it in 1596, since when it has been primarily Protestant.

=== Incorporations ===
- 1924: Dennjächt
- 1 June 1972: Kapfenhardt

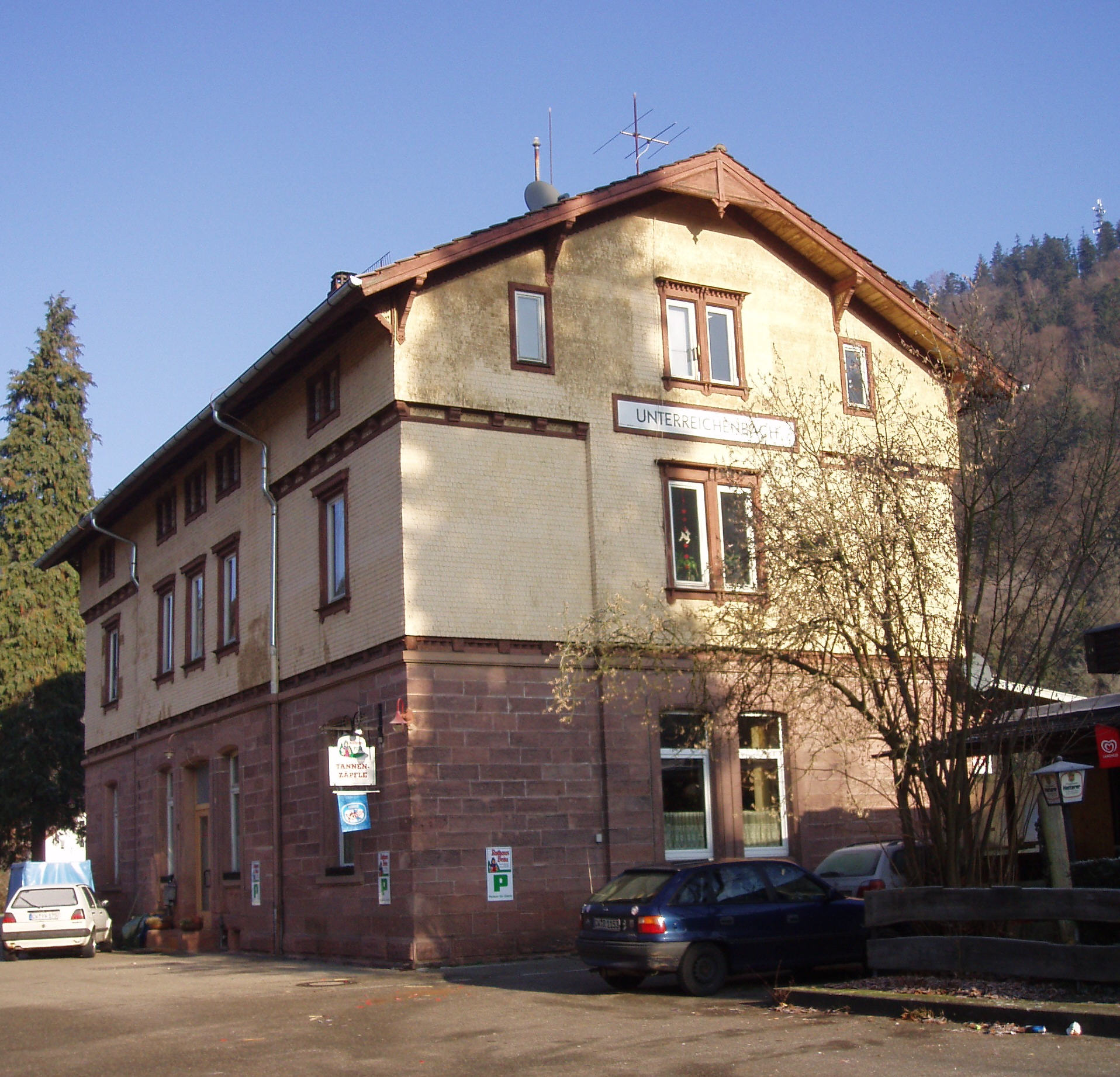
Unterreichenbach station

== Economy and infrastructure ==
=== Transport ===
Unterreichenbach is served by the Nagold Valley Railway, which runs from Pforzheim to Horb am Neckar.

=== Education ===
Unterreichenbach has a kindergarten and a Grundschule (elementary school); older children attend schools in neighboring localities.
