= Gechingen =

German municipality

- Municipality

- Coat of arms

- Location of Gechingen within Calw district
- Interactive map of Gechingen
- Location within Germany Location within Baden-Württemberg
- Coordinates: 48°41′47″N 08°49′49″E
- Country: Germany
- State: Baden-Württemberg
- Admin. region: Karlsruhe
- District: Calw

Government
  - Mayor (2018–26): Jens Häußler

Area
  - Total: 14.68 km^{2} (5.67 sq mi)
- Elevation: 485 m (1,591 ft)

Population (2025-12-31)
  - Total: 3,636
  - Density: 247.7/km^{2} (641.5/sq mi)
- Time zone: UTC+01:00 (CET)
  - Summer (DST): UTC+02:00 (CEST)
- Postal codes: 75391
- Dialling codes: 07056
- Vehicle registration: CW
- Website: www.gechingen.de

Gechingen (German pronunciation: [ˈɡɛçɪŋən]) is a municipality in the district of Calw in Baden-Württemberg in Germany.

== History ==
Gechingen was first mentioned in 1110 as a fief of the County of Calw in a document outlining gifts made by local nobility to Hirsau Abbey. Lordship over Gechingen was inherited by the County Palatine of Tübingen, who sold the town to Herrenalb Abbey in 1308 or 1309. As a result of the Protestant Reformation, Herrenalb Abbey was secularized and its holdings seized by the Duchy of Württemberg, whose government assigned the town to the monastic office at Merklingen. In 1808, Gechingen was made a municipality and assigned to Oberamt Calw. That district was reformed in 1938 as Landkreis Calw, and Gechingen remained in its jurisdiction. Gechingen grew slowly in the years after World War II and not see significant urban growth until the 1960s.

== Geography ==
The municipality (Gemeinde) of Gechingen is located at the western edge of the district of Calw, along its border with the district of Böblingen. Gechingen is physically located in the Heckengäu and Schlehengäu regions of the Black Forest, within the greater region of the Upper Gäu. Elevation above sea level in the municipal area ranges from a high of 757 meters (2,484 ft) Normalnull (NN) to a low of 455 meters (1,493 ft) NN.

A portion of the Federally protected Würm-Heckengäu nature reserve is located in Gechingen's municipal area.

== Politics ==
Gechingen has one borough (Ortsteil), Gechingen, and four villages: Berghöfe, Bergwald, Dachtgrubenhöfe, and Waldhof. Gechingen is a member of the Althengstett Municipal Association with the municipalities of Althengstett, Ostelsheim, and Simmozheim.

=== Coat of arms ===
Gechingen's coat of arms displays a lion, in red, standing on a blue, three-pointed hill and facing to the left with a blue crosier in its forepaws, upon a field of yellow. This coat of arms was created with advice from the Central State Archive Stuttgart, as Gechingen did not have one and instead used the coat of arms of Württemberg in its seals. The lion upon the hill is taken from the arms of the Counts of Calw, while the crosier references Herrenalb Abbey. The Federal Ministry of the Interior awarded this coat of arms to Gechingen alongside a municipal flag on 18 July 1955.

== Transportation ==
Gechingen is connected to Germany's network of roadways by its local Kreisstraßen, which connect to the Bundesautobahn 81 near Gärtringen, about 10 kilometers (6.2 mi) outside of Gechingen's municipal area. Local public transportation is provided by the Verkehrsgesellschaft Bäderkreis Calw.
