= Wildberg, Baden-Württemberg =

German municipality

Wildberg
- Town
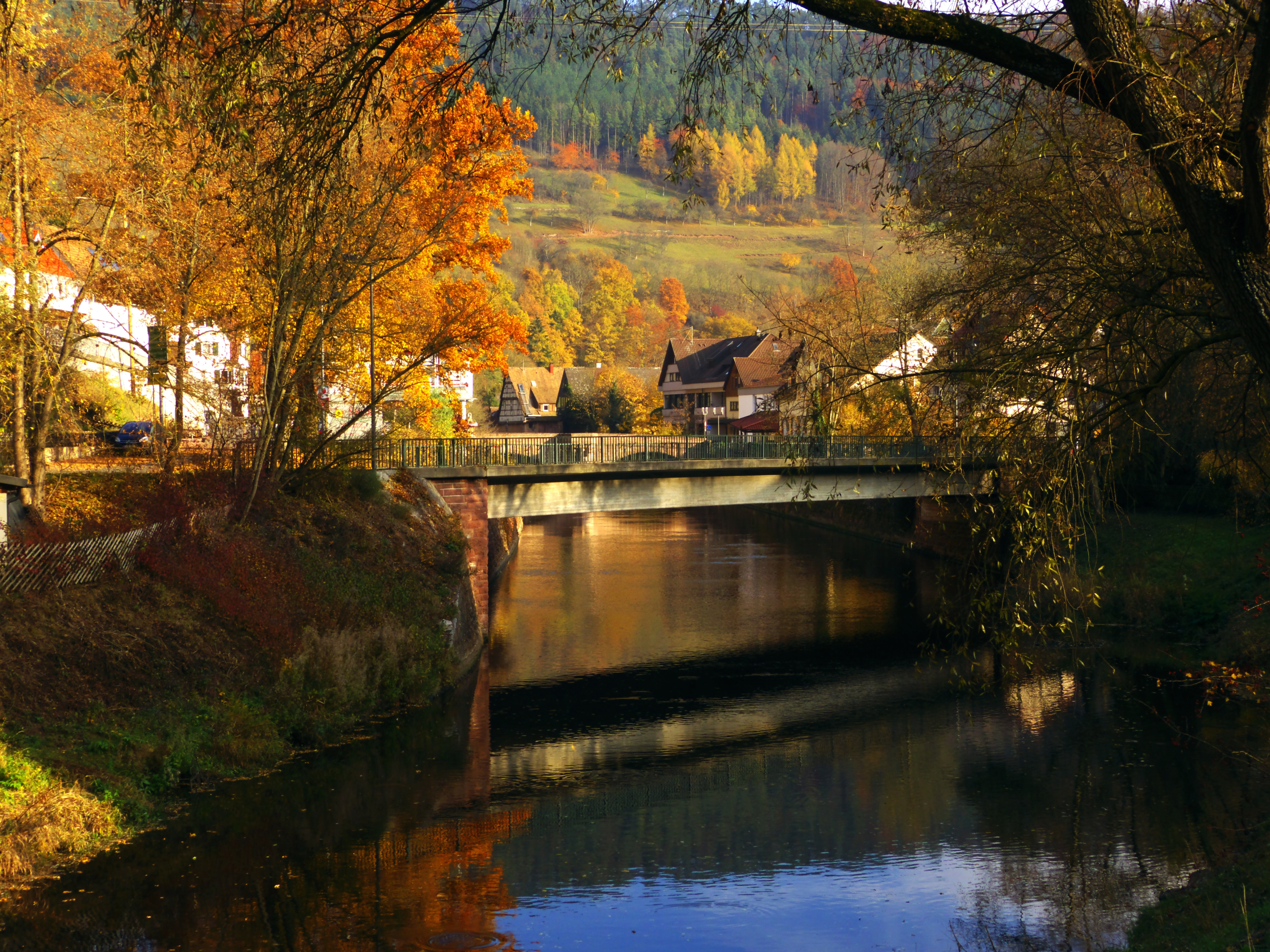
- View of Bundesstraße 463

- Coat of arms

- Location of Wildberg within Calw district
- Interactive map of Wildberg
- Location within Germany Location within Baden-Württemberg
- Coordinates: 48°37′26″N 8°44′50″E
- Country: Germany
- State: Baden-Württemberg
- Admin. region: Karlsruhe
- District: Calw

Area
  - Total: 56.68 km^{2} (21.88 sq mi)
- Elevation: 395 m (1,296 ft)

Population (2025-12-31)
  - Total: 10,045
  - Density: 177.2/km^{2} (459.0/sq mi)
- Time zone: UTC+01:00 (CET)
  - Summer (DST): UTC+02:00 (CEST)
- Postal codes: 72218
- Dialling codes: 07054
- Vehicle registration: CW
- Website: www.wildberg.de

Wildberg (German pronunciation: [ˈvɪltbɛʁk]) is a town in the district of Calw in Baden-Württemberg, Germany.

== History ==
Wildberg was founded by County of Hohenberg around 1281 at the foot of a castle built around 1200 by the County Palatine of Tübingen. Over the course of the 14th century, Wildberg became a possession of the Electoral Palatinate, who sold it and the towns of Schönbronn, Sulz am Eck, and Gültlingen to the County of Württemberg in 1440. The latter town would not be fully controlled by Württemberg until 1445, when it purchased the properties of other local nobles. These towns would exist in their own district until 1807, when the government of the Kingdom of Württemberg assigned them to Oberamt Nagold, which was dissolved in 1938 and replaced by Landkreis Calw. After World War II, Effringen, Gültlingen and Sulz am Eck established new residential areas but it was not until the 1970s that Wildberg also began growing. In 1971, Schönbronn merged into Wildberg and was followed four years later by Effringen, Gültlingen and Sulz am Eck. Growth slows in Gültlingen, Schönbronn, and Sulz am Eck, but continued in Wildberg into the 1990s.

== Geography ==
The township (Stadt) of Wildberg is situated on the eastern edge of the district of Calw, in the German state of Baden-Württemberg, and lies along the border with the district of Böblingen to the east. Wildberg is physically located in the valley of the Nagold, between the Northern Black Forest to the west and the Upper Gäu to the east. Elevation above sea level in the municipal area ranges from a high of 638 meters (2,093 ft) Normalnull (NN) to a low of 356 meters (1,168 ft) NN.

Portions of the Federally protected Gebersack, Gültlinger und Holzbronner Heiden, and Hülbe bei Sulz nature reserves are located in Wildberg's municipal area.

== Politics ==
Wildberg has five boroughs (Ortsteile) – Effringen, Gültlingen, Schönbronn, Sulz am Eck, and Wildberg – and nine villages: Haselstaller Höfe, Käpfleshöfe, Kengelhöfe, Lerchenberg, Obere Papiermühle, Reuthin, Trölleshof, Untere Papiermühle, and Untere Sägmühle. Also located in the municipal area are the minor administrative area of Ziegelhütte and the abandoned villages of Berfeldingen, Gaisburg, and Weiler.

=== Coat of arms ===
The municipal coat of arms of Wildberg is divided party per fess into an upper, white half containing a black stag antler, and a lower, red half containing a white "W". The fields and the overall red-white tincture are taken from the arms of the Counts of Hohenberg and first began appearing in town seals in 1297. The "W" became a local motif some time before 1660, first appearing in local seals in 1593. The stag antler is also a long-lived local motif and was first used around 1612. The municipal coat of arms was approved on 26 January 1976 by the Federal Ministry of the Interior and a municipal flag issued to Wildberg.

== Transportation ==
Wildberg is connected to Germany's network of roadways by Bundesstraße 463 and its system of railways by Nagold Valley Railway. Local public transportation is provided by the Verkehrsgesellschaft Bäderkreis Calw, which provides connections to the Stuttgart S-Bahn at Gärtringen and Herrenberg and to the Ammer Valley Railway at Tübingen.

== See also ==
- 117506 Wildberg
