= Miguel Klauß =

German politician (born 1986)

Member of the Landtag of Baden-Württemberg
- Incumbent
- Assumed office 11 May 2021

Personal details
- Born: 7 July 1986 (age 40) Nagold
- Party: Alternative for Germany (since 2013)

Miguel Klauß (born 7 July 1986 in Nagold) is a German politician serving as a member of the Landtag of Baden-Württemberg since 2021. He has been a member of the Alternative for Germany since 2013.
