= Ebhausen =

German municipality

- Municipality
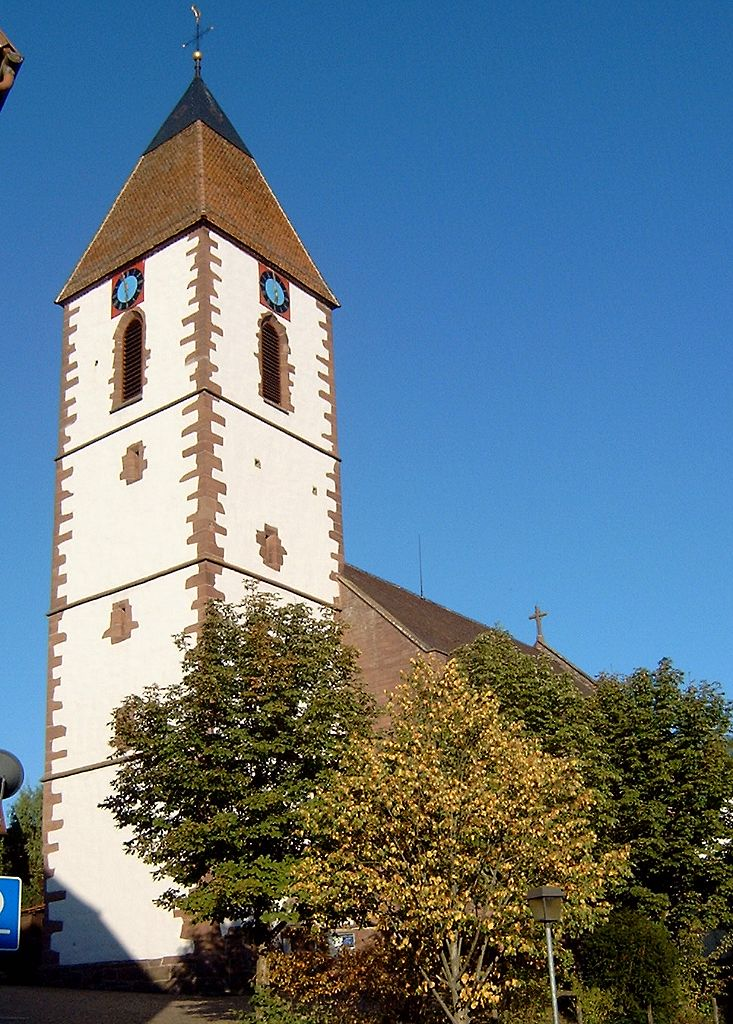
- Our Lady of Ebhausen

- Coat of arms

- Location of Ebhausen within Calw district
- Interactive map of Ebhausen
- Location within Germany Location within Baden-Württemberg
- Coordinates: 48°35′N 8°41′E
- Country: Germany
- State: Baden-Württemberg
- Admin. region: Karlsruhe
- District: Calw

Area
  - Total: 24.56 km^{2} (9.48 sq mi)
- Elevation: 460 m (1,510 ft)

Population (2025-12-31)
  - Total: 4,834
  - Density: 196.8/km^{2} (509.8/sq mi)
- Time zone: UTC+01:00 (CET)
  - Summer (DST): UTC+02:00 (CEST)
- Postal codes: 72224
- Dialling codes: 07458 07054 Rotfelden
- Vehicle registration: CW
- Website: www.ebhausen.de

Ebhausen is a town in the district of Calw in Baden-Württemberg in Germany.

== History ==
The municipality of Ebhausen was formed in 1975 by the merging of Ebhausen, Ebershardt, Rotfelden, and Wenden in 1975.

== Geography ==
The municipality (Gemeinde) of Ebhausen is located at the center of the district of Calw, in the German state of Baden-Württemberg. Ebhausen's municipal area lies in a transitional landscape between the Black Forest and the Heckengäu, though a portion of it falls in the Upper Gäu to the east. Elevation above sea level in the municipal area ranges from a high of 576 meters (1,890 ft) Normalnull (NN) to a low of 403 meters (1,322 ft) NN.

A portion of the Federally protected Mindersbach valley nature reserve is located in Ebhausen's municipal area.

== Politics ==
Ebhausen has four boroughs – Ebershardt, Ebhausen, Rotfelden, and Wenden – and three villages: Gärtenfeld, Schwarzenbachmühle, Ziegelhütte. Also in the municipal area are the industrial district of Wöllhausen and the abandoned villages of Berghäuser, Grashart, and Höfen.

=== Coat of arms ===
Ebhausen's municipal coat of arms is divided party per pale into a yellow half, which contains a black woodcutting axe, on the left and a black half on the right. Both are crossed by a red line. Sans the axe, this was the coat of arms of the Houses of Wolthausen and Vogtsberg, who ruled over Ebhausen and Wenden as vogts respectively. The axe is lifted from the arms of a local noble, Wetzel von Ebhausen, and the tincture from the arms of Rotfelden. This coat of arms was awarded along with a municipal flag by the Calw district office on 10 February 1984.

== Transportation ==
Ebhausen is connected to Germany's network of roadways by the Bundesstraße 28. The municipality was also connected by rail via the Nagold-Altensteig narrow gauge railway from 1981 until its shutdown in 1967. Local public transportation is provided by the Verkehrsgesellschaft Bäderkreis Calw.
