= Calw (district) =

Coordinates: 48.7°N 8.74°E

- District
- Flag Coat of arms
- Country: Germany
- State: Baden-Württemberg
- Adm. region: Karlsruhe
- Capital: Calw

Government
  - District admin.: Helmut Riegger (CDU)

Area
  - Total: 797.54 km^{2} (307.93 sq mi)

Population (31 December 2024)
  - Total: 161,251
  - Density: 202.19/km^{2} (523.66/sq mi)
- Time zone: UTC+01:00 (CET)
  - Summer (DST): UTC+02:00 (CEST)
- Vehicle registration: CW
- Website: www.kreis-calw.de

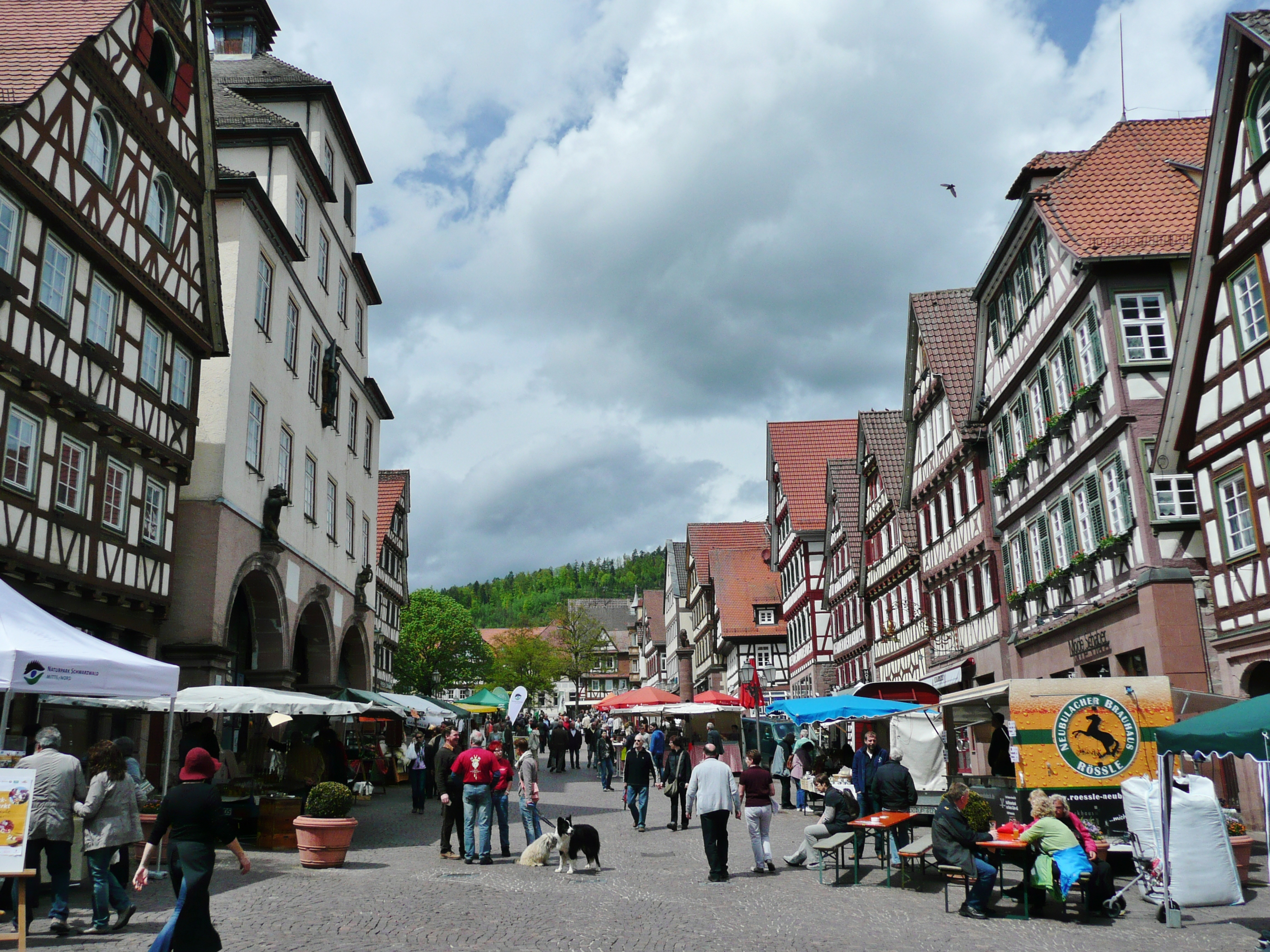
Marketplace Calw

Calw is a Landkreis (district) in Baden-Württemberg, Germany. Neighboring districts are (from north clockwise) Karlsruhe, Enz, the district-free city Pforzheim, Böblingen, Freudenstadt and Rastatt.

== History ==
The district was established in 1938 through the merger of the former Oberamt Calw with the neighbouring districts of Neuenbürg and Nagold. During the 1973 administrative reform, it was initially planned that the district would be dissolved and its municipalities redistributed among adjacent districts. However, as it already met the intended population and size criteria for the newly created districts, these plans were ultimately abandoned. Nevertheless, some boundary adjustments were carried out: 15 municipalities were transferred to the districts of Enz, Rastatt, and Böblingen, while the district gained six municipalities from Freudenstadt and from the dissolved district of Horb.

== Geography ==
The district belongs to the northern part of the Black Forest mountains. The main rivers are the Nagold and the Enz.

== Partnerships ==
Since 1991 the district has partnership with the district Freiberg in Saxony.

== Coat of arms ==
The coat of arms, which is nearly identical to the coat of arms of the city Calw, shows the lion of the Counts of Calw on top of three mountains. The three mountains represent the three former counties over which the Counts of Calw once reigned, namely Calw, Löwenstein and Vaihingen. (The latter two cities are not part of the present-day district of Calw) The fountain in the bottom represents the springs and spas in the district.

== Cities and towns ==
Cities
1. Altensteig
2. Bad Herrenalb
3. Bad Liebenzell
4. Bad Teinach-Zavelstein
5. Bad Wildbad
6. Calw
7. Haiterbach
8. Nagold
9. Neubulach
10. Wildberg
Administrative districts
1. Altensteig
2. Althengstett
3. Bad Herrenalb
4. Bad Liebenzell
5. Teinachtal
6. Calw
7. Nagold
8. Bad Wildbad
Towns
1. Althengstett
2. Dobel
3. Ebhausen
4. Egenhausen
5. Enzklösterle
6. Gechingen
7. Höfen an der Enz
8. Neuweiler
9. Oberreichenbach
10. Ostelsheim
11. Rohrdorf
12. Schömberg
13. Simmersfeld
14. Simmozheim
15. Unterreichenbach

Clickable map of municipalities in the district
