= Nagold =

- Town
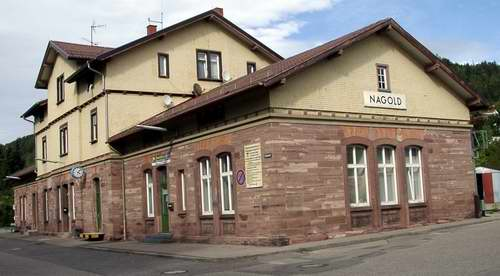
- Railway station

- Coat of arms

- Location of Nagold within Calw district
- Interactive map of Nagold
- Location within Germany Location within Baden-Württemberg
- Coordinates: 48°33′7″N 8°43′32″E
- Country: Germany
- State: Baden-Württemberg
- Admin. region: Karlsruhe
- District: Calw
- Subdivisions: 9

Government
  - Mayor (2016–24): Jürgen Großmann (CDU)

Area
  - Total: 63.09 km^{2} (24.36 sq mi)
- Elevation: 411 m (1,348 ft)

Population (2025-12-31)
  - Total: 23,813
  - Density: 377.4/km^{2} (977.6/sq mi)
- Time zone: UTC+01:00 (CET)
  - Summer (DST): UTC+02:00 (CEST)
- Postal codes: 72191–72202
- Dialling codes: 07452, 07459
- Vehicle registration: CW
- Website: www.nagold.de

Nagold (German pronunciation: [ˈnaːɡɔlt]) is a town in southwestern Germany, bordering the Northern Black Forest. It is located in the Landkreis (district) of Calw (Germany/Baden-Württemberg). Nagold is recorded for the first time in a historical document dating back to 786, specified as "villa nagaltuna." Nagold is known for its ruined castle, Hohennagold Castle, and for its road viaduct. It takes its name from the river Nagold, which flows through the town.

Nagold has a city centre with both half-timbered houses and modern architecture. The following small villages belong to the district of Nagold: Emmingen, Gündringen, Hochdorf, Iselshausen, Mindersbach, Pfrondorf, Schietingen and Vollmaringen.

== History ==
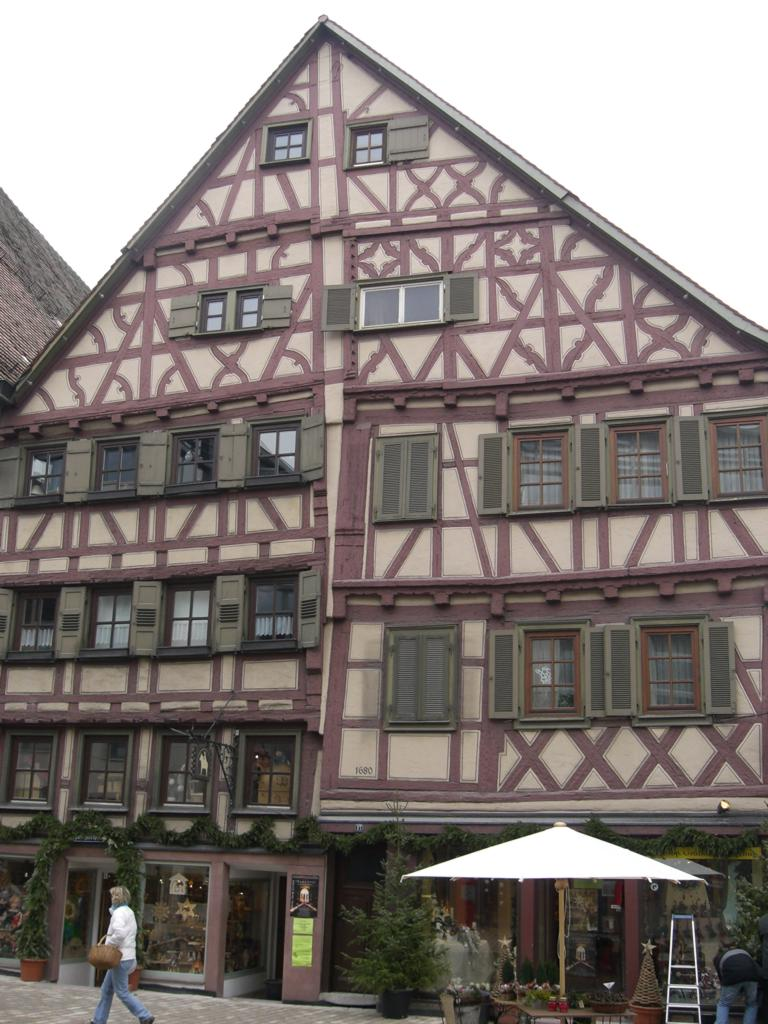
Notable half-timbered house in Nagold.

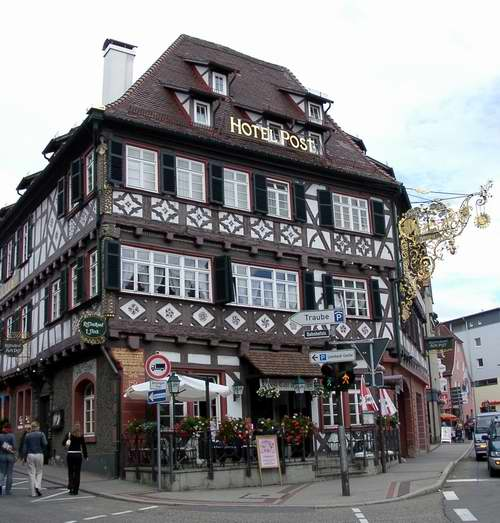
Hotel Post

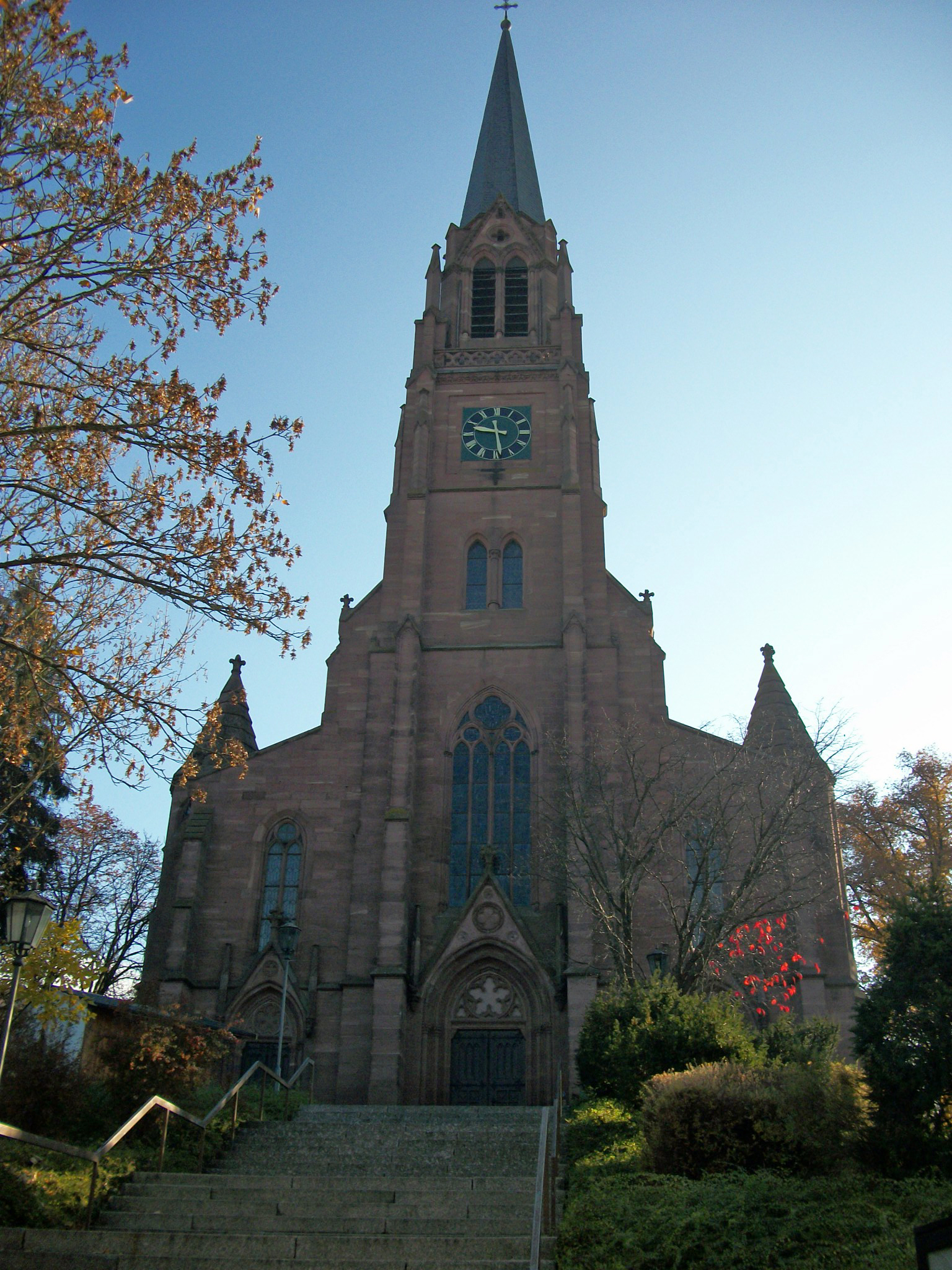
Protestant church

The Nagold Basin was probably settled as early as the early Stone Age: 2000 to 3000 BCE. With its fertile soil and mild climate in the low mountain ridge, the basin afforded ideal possibilities for settlement. Traces of early human occupation from the Hallstatt culture (700 to 450 BCE) have been found in the "Bächlen" area. The Celts were in the Nagold basin by the 6th and 5th centuries BCE. They were responsible for naming the river Nagold, meaning "flowing stretch of water". A Celtic royal burial mound (locally called Krautbühl) and signs of numerous settlements and graves have been found on and around Schlossberg.

By the 1st century, the Romans had established two settlements in the basin. One of these settlements was unearthed in the 7th century during construction of Remigiuskirche. Stone walls from the remains were used in the Remigiuskirche foundation.

The Alamanni expelled the Romans from the Nagold Basin around 260. They emphasized settlement of the valley, and expanded their territory. Around 700, the Franks conquered the Alamanni. The Remigiuskirche was built during this time, and it is assumed the Franks established a court in the area. Nagold became the administrative center of the region which extended from Bondorf to Kniebis. Small towns and settlements began to spring up around Nagold. Pfalzgraf Rudolf von Tübingen established Nagold as a city early in the 13th century in order to protect his holdings in the northern Black Forest. Through marriage in the year 1230, Nagold came under the control of the Grafen von Hohenberg, who sped up development of the city. By the end of the 13th century, Nagold was encircled with a 5.5-metre-high (18 ft) wall, complete with moat and gate towers. Around 1350, the Plague devastated the population.

The Hohennagold Castle, located on the Schlossberg, showcases a rich historical evolution, with its earliest signs of settlement dating back to the Bronze Age, around 1200 BC. The precise chronology regarding the construction phases of the earliest sections of the medieval edifice remains ambiguous. Established in the 11th century by the Counts of Tübingen, the medieval Hohennagold Castle was constructed atop the foundations of an earlier fortification. Subsequent expansions were executed by the Counts of Hohenberg and Württemberg, notably including the development of the outer bailey in the 15th and early 16th centuries. The structure suffered extensive damage during the Thirty Years' War, leading to a directive from the Duke of Württemberg for its dismantlement.

Construction was begun on Marienkirche church in 1360. The church was razed in 1876–1877, but an original tower built in 1401 still stands on Turmstrasse.

In 1363 the Hohenbergs were forced out of Nagold, and the Dukes Eberhard and Ulrich von Württemberg bought the city. Nagold then served as a court city (Amtstadt), and in 1806 was elevated to a high court city (Oberamtstadt), which lasted until being abolished in 1938.

In the 16th century, farmers' uprisings led to the departure of the local aristocracy. Austria, always looking to expand the Habsburg domain, quickly moved into the Nagold area. Herzog Ulrich reclaimed his lands in 1534, and embraced Protestantism. In 1543, the Reformation was ushered into Nagold, just as it was throughout the entire Duchy of Württemberg during that period.

During the Thirty Years' War (1618–1647), the Burg Hohennagold (castle) was destroyed.

Parts of Nagold were destroyed in devastating fires in 1825, 1850, 1887, and 1893. Marktstrasse is one of the few streets in Nagold to have escaped destruction in the fires. A large of portion of the architecture on this street dates to the 18th century, and includes the three-story Rathaus (1756–1758), the Stadtbrunnen (city fountain), the Schmidsche Apotheke with rich ornamentation, and numerous Fachwerk (timbered) houses from the 17th century. Other architectural treasures are scattered through the city. Among these are the Alte Schule (old school, 1706) and the Alte Vogtei with Celtic origins. The hotel "Alte Post" (1699) served as a stop on the old mail line between Stuttgart and Strasbourg. The Oberamtei (from 14th century) is located on Oberamteistrasse, and was the location of the high court (Oberamt) from 1812 until 1938.

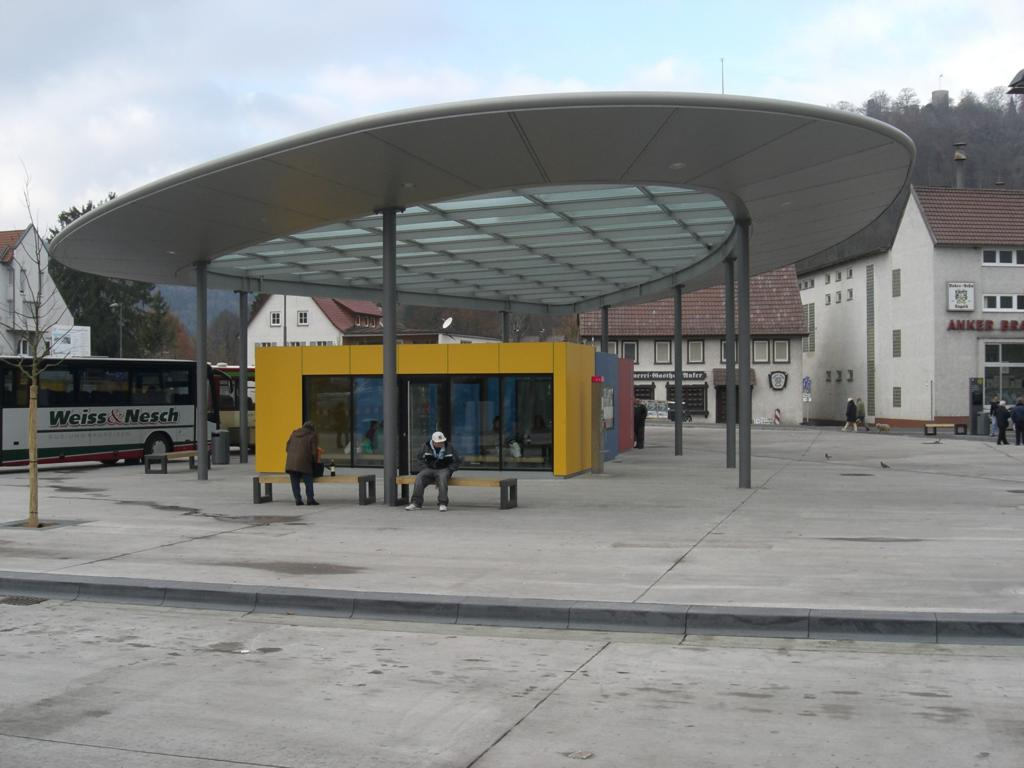
Bus station in Nagold

As early as 1924, Nagold was a NSDAP (Nazi) base of support. According to voting statistics, 19.4% of the population voted NSDAP in May 1924. Comparatively, the NSDAP captured just 6.5% of the vote nationwide, and a mere 4.1% in Baden and Württemberg during the same election.

Nagold was designated as a "large district town" (Große Kreisstadt) in 1981. During this time, the town was embarking on a redevelopment of its outdated urban neighborhoods and commercial zones in the valleys of Nagold and Waldach. Many existing structures, hastily rebuilt after past fires, were being replaced with new buildings because they were often beyond repair. However, some of the older buildings that were considered valuable were being restored with help from both the city and state grants.

The Reunification of Germany in 1989 brought new hopes for the future of Germany and Nagold, but was quickly followed by the worst recession in post-war history. Home construction, attraction of industry, and improvement of infrastructure have been difficult problems for Nagold. A city policy of construction, combined with improvement of the old city center, are cornerstones of the city planning. In 1992, the city's open-air swimming pool was amended with an indoor pool, and in 1996 a new cultural center named "Kubus" was built in the city center.

With the completion of the city center bypass in 2003, the redevelopment of the city center began under the guiding principle of a “renaissance of centrality”. In 2008, the development of permanent infrastructure for "the State Garden Show" (die Landesgartenschau) commenced. This initiative significantly contributed to the urban redevelopment of the city, particularly post-2012, as it played a crucial role in shaping the urban landscape and enhancing public green spaces.

== Population development ==
Data source: Estimates, Census results, data from statistical offices.

Year	Inhabitants
1639	836
1697	1.437
1803	1.771
1849	2.612
1890	3.540
1925	3.909
1939	4.573
1946	5.264

Year	Inhabitants
1950	6.216
1970	12.483
1980	20.334
1990	21.505
2000	22.807
2010	21.756
2014	22.062
2021	22.635

== Mayors and (since 1981) Lord Mayors ==
- 1819–1828: Konrad Greiner
- 1828–1848: Gottlieb Fuchsstatt
- 1848–1888: Eduard Friedrich Engel
- 1888–1913: Friedrich Brodbeck
- 1913–1945: Hermann Maier
- 1945–1946: Walter Wolf
- 1946–1974: Eugen Breitling
- 1974–1992: Joachim Bernhard Schultis, CDU
- 1992–2008: Rainer Prewo, SPD
- since 2008: Jürgen Großmann, CDU

== Notable people ==
- Giovanni Atzeni (born 1985), Jockey
- Rolf Benz (born 1933), entrepreneur, founder of Rolf Benz AG (furniture)
- Martin Brecht (born 1932), professor for church history in Münster
- Stefan Dörflinger (born 1949), motorcycle racing driver
- Johann Epp (born 1521), rector of the University of Tübingen
- Johann Friedrich Groß (born 1732), professor of physics in Karlsruhe and Stuttgart
- Ulrich Grosse (born 1953), local traffic consultant
- Miguel Klauß (born 1986), German politician
- Silke Maier-Witt (born 1950), former member of the RAF
