= Karlsruhe (region) =

- Regierungsbezirk
- Map of Baden-Württemberg highlighting Karlsruhe
- Coordinates: 49°00′N 8°30′E
- Country: Germany
- State: Baden-Württemberg
- Region seat: Karlsruhe

Government
  - District President: Alexander Föhr (CDU)

Area
  - Total: 6,919.17 km^{2} (2,671.51 sq mi)

Population (31 December 2025)
  - Total: 2,847,804
  - Density: 411.582/km^{2} (1,065.99/sq mi)

GDP
  - Total: €157.762 billion (2024)
  - Per capita: €55,394 (2024)
- Website: rp.baden-wuerttemberg.de/rpk/Seiten/default.aspx

Karlsruhe is one of the four administrative regions (sing. Regierungsbezirk) of Baden-Württemberg, Germany, located in the north-west of the state. It is subdivided into the three regional associations (sing. Regionalverband): Mittlerer Oberrhein (Middle Upper Rhine), Rhein-Neckar (Rhine-Neckar) and Nordschwarzwald (Northern Black Forest).

Kreise
(districts)
1. Calw
2. Enz
3. Freudenstadt
4. Karlsruhe
5. Neckar-Odenwald
6. Rastatt
7. Rhein-Neckar-Kreis
Kreisfreie Städte
(district-free cities)
1. Baden-Baden
2. Heidelberg
3. Karlsruhe
4. Mannheim
5. Pforzheim

== Economy ==
The Gross domestic product (GDP) of the region was €123.3 billion in 2018, accounting for 3.7% of German economic output. GDP per capita adjusted for purchasing power was €40,400 or 134% of the EU27 average in the same year. The GDP per employee was 109% of the EU average.

== Butterflies ==
The Regierungspräsidium garants permissions to catch butterflies in Baden-Württemberg. The information are into the system Landesdatenbank Schmetterlinge - Staatlichen Museum für Naturkunde.
