= List of craters on the Moon with fractured floors =

This is a list of craters indicated as having a fractured crater floor in Plate 5A. Structural Features of The Geologic History of the Moon by Don Wilhelms.

- Anders X
- Anderson E
- Anderson F
- Atlas
- Airy
- Alphonsus
- Balboa
- Beals
- Bohnenberger
- Bohnenberger A
- Bunsen
- Dalton
- Damoiseau
- Daniell
- Davy
- Doppelmayer
- Fontenelle
- Galvani
- Gaudibert
- Gassendi
- Gerard Q Outer
- Haldane
- Hansteen
- Helmert
- Hesiodus
- Hogg
- Humboldt
- Kao
- Kiess
- Komarov
- Kopff
- Kostinskiy
- La Condamine
- Lassell
- Lavoisier
- Lavoisier B
- Lavoisier E
- Lavoisier F
- Lavoisier H
- Maupertuis
- Mersenius
- Nernst
- Olbers
- Palitzsch
- Pitatus
- Posidonius
- Purkyně U
- Purkyně V
- Tamm
- Tannerus
- Taruntius
- Thebit
- Repsold
- Repsold G
- Ritter
- Runge
- Sabine
- Sarton X
- Sarton Y
- Schubert C
- Swasey
- Van den Bos
- Vasco da Gama
- Vasco da Gama C
- Vasco da Gama R
- Vitello
- Volta
- Von Braun
- Warner
- Widmannstätten
- Zwicky N
- Unnamed crater northwest of Balboa B
- Unnamed crater within Baldet
- Unnamed crater north of Bartels
- Unnamed crater northwest of Bartels
- Unnamed crater northwest of Borman
- Two unnamed crater west of Cori
- Unnamed crater north of Dawson
- Two unnamed craters within of Einsten
- Unnamed crater southwest of Poincaré X
- Unnamed crater southwest of Schubert C
- Unnamed crater south of Schubert C
- Unnamed crater southwest of Struve H

== Examples ==
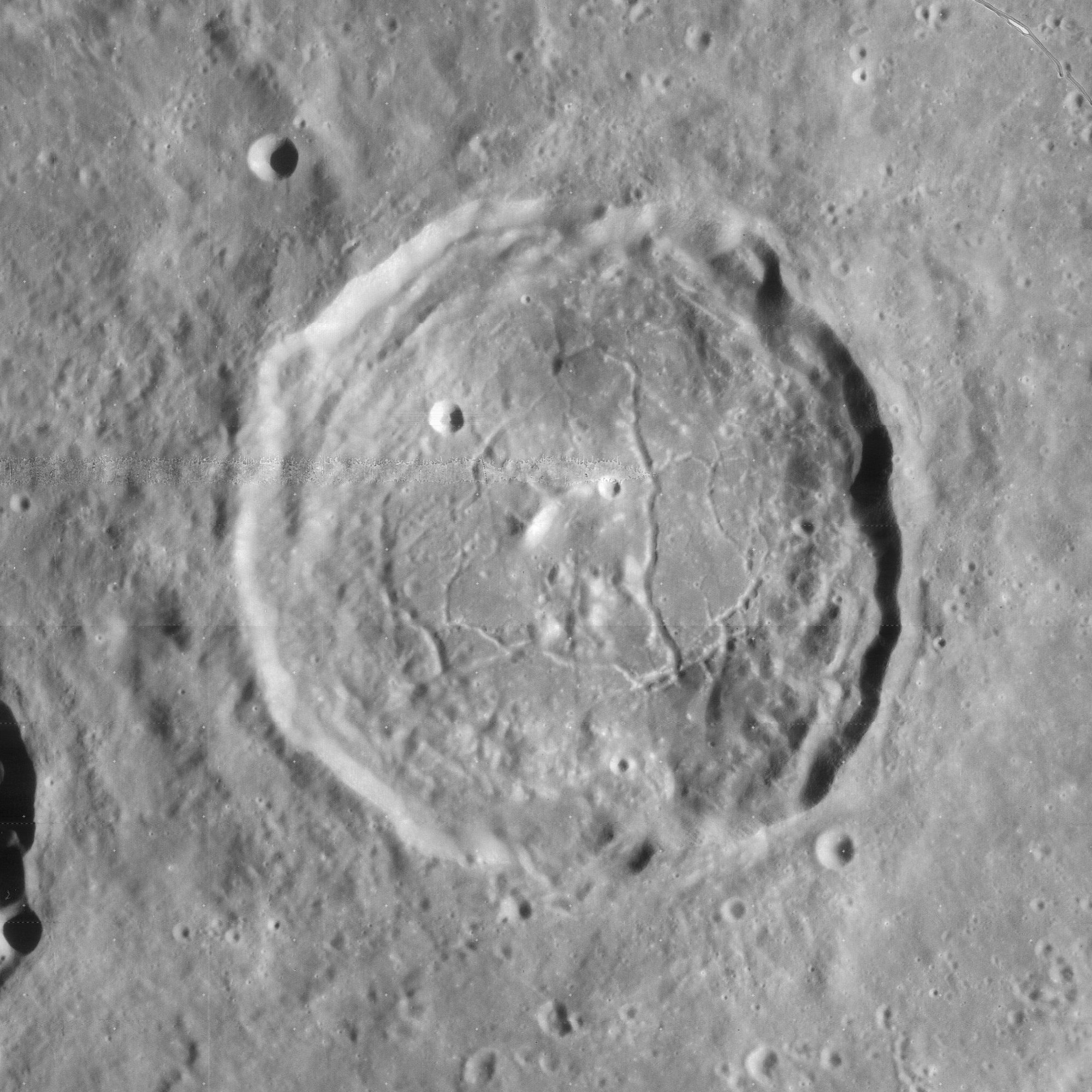
Atlas

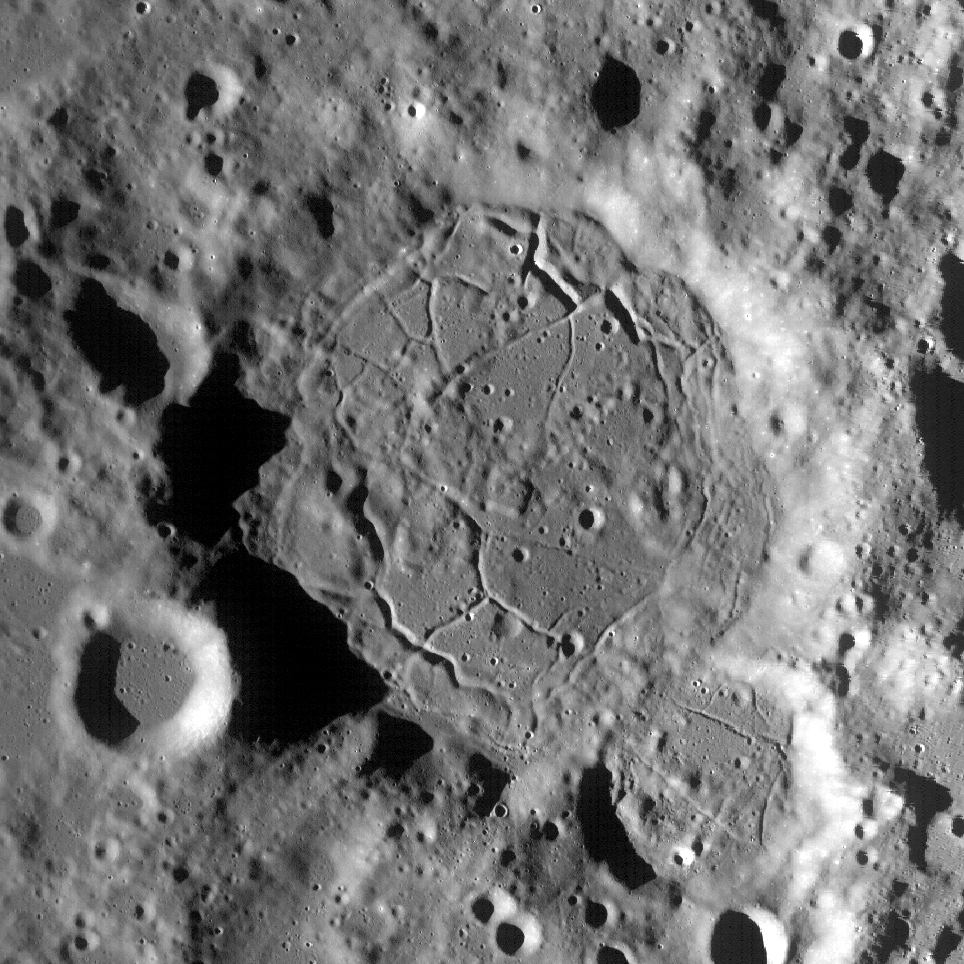
Bunsen

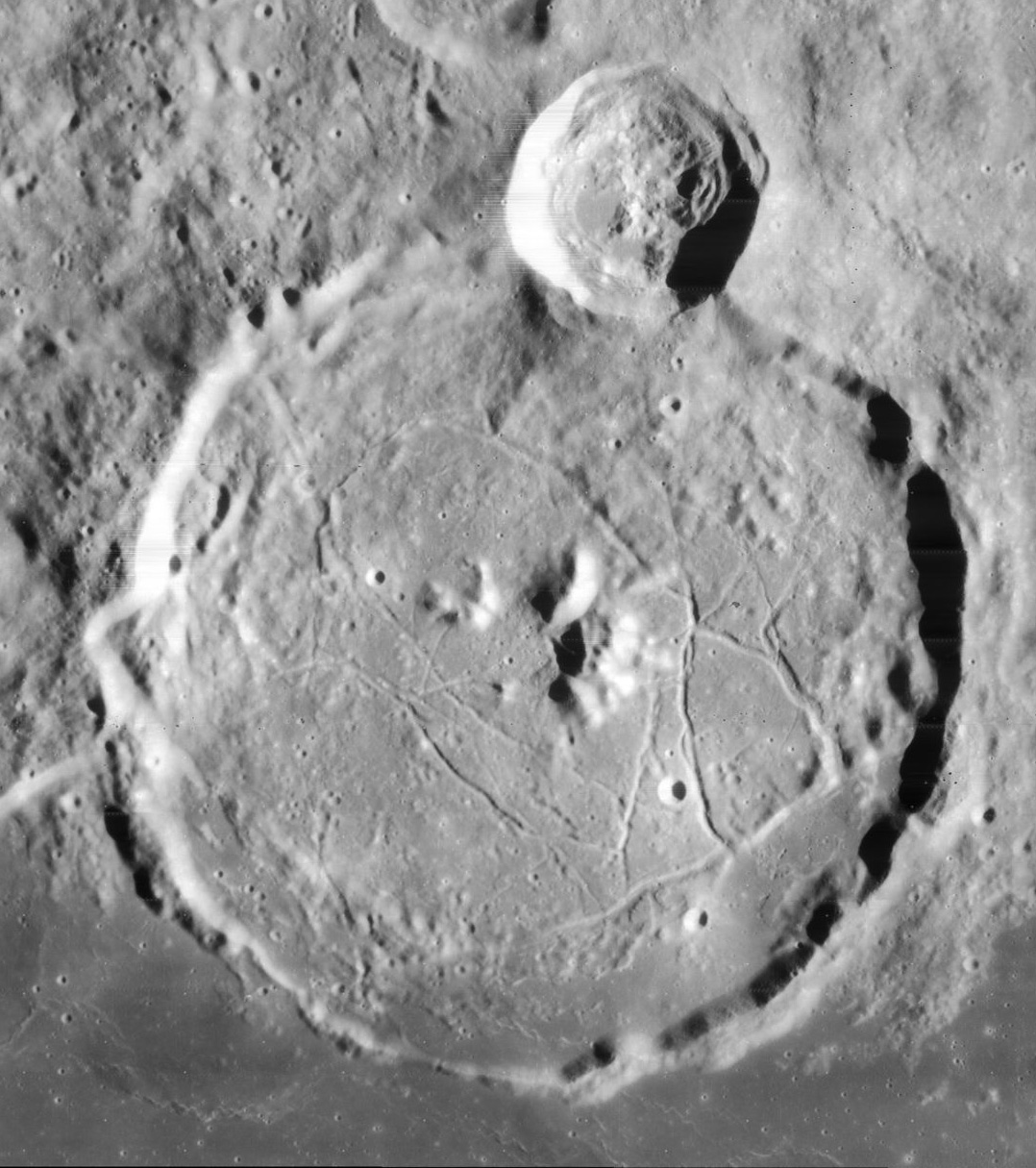
Gassendi

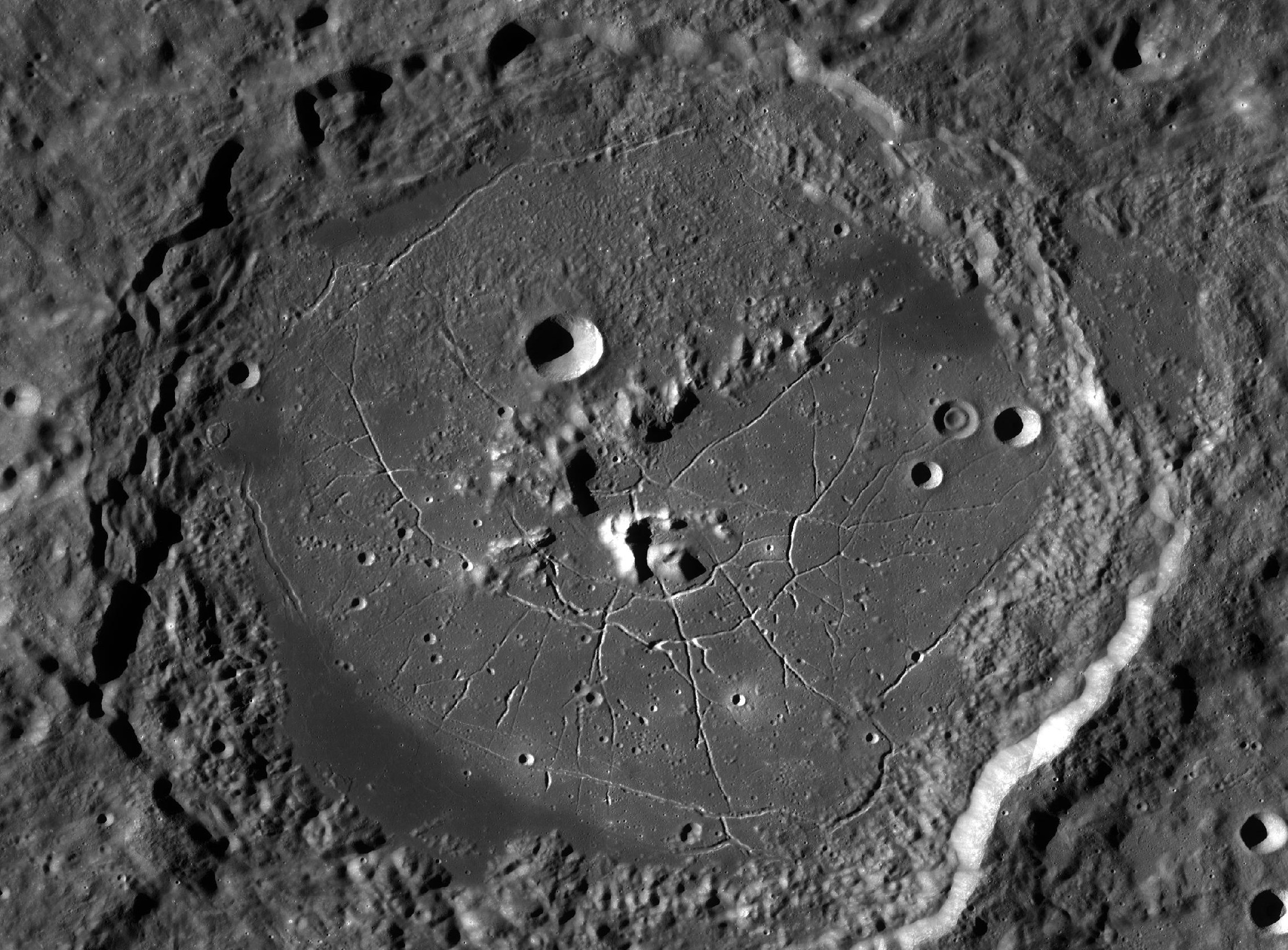
Humboldt

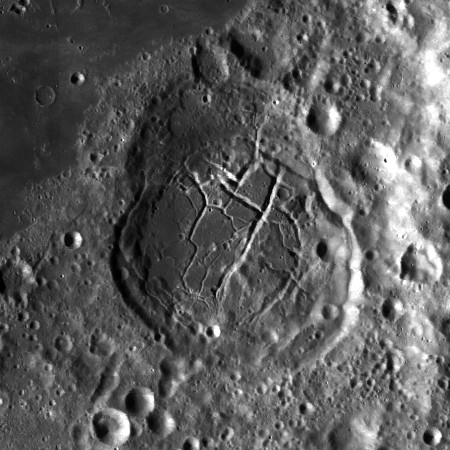
Komarov

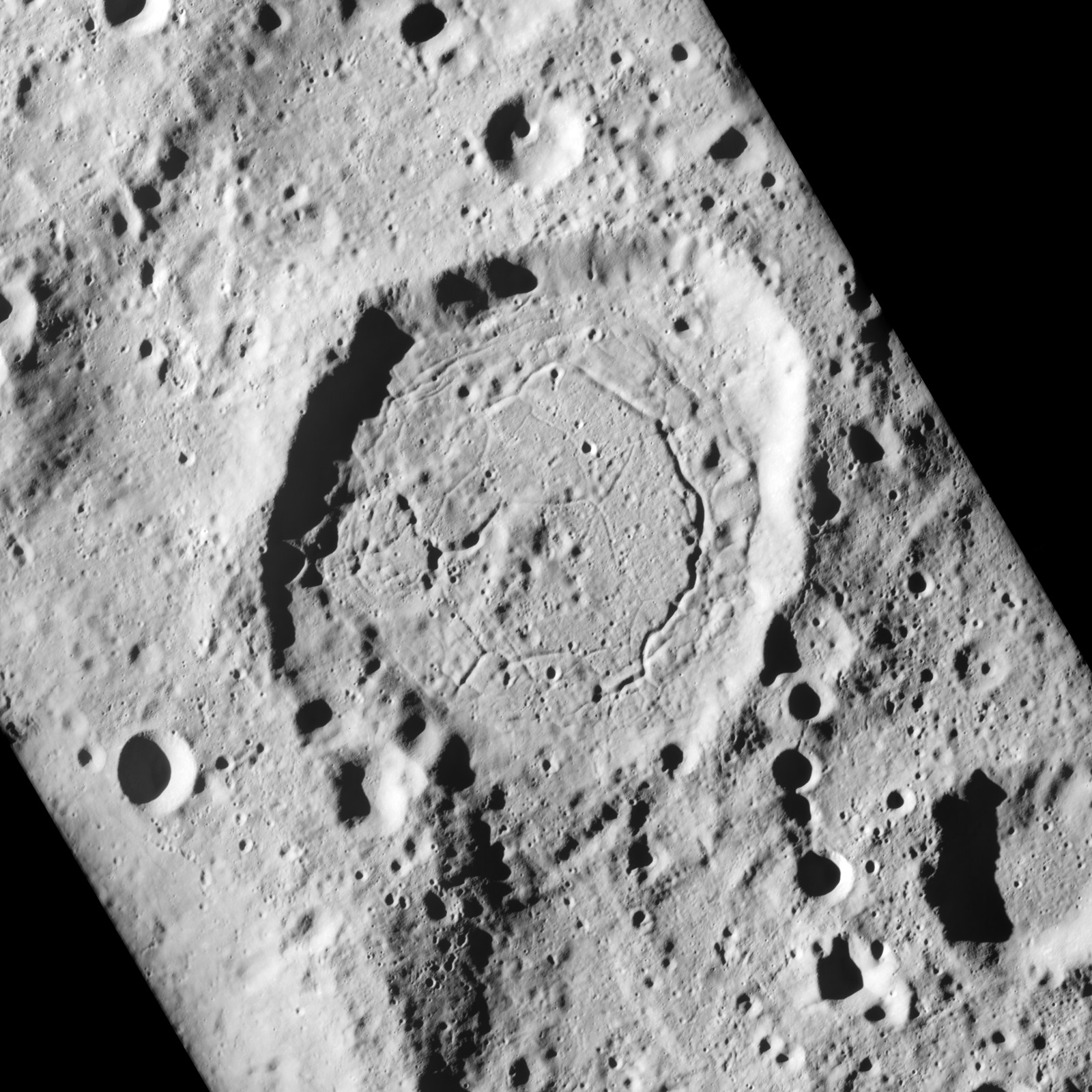
Kostinskiy

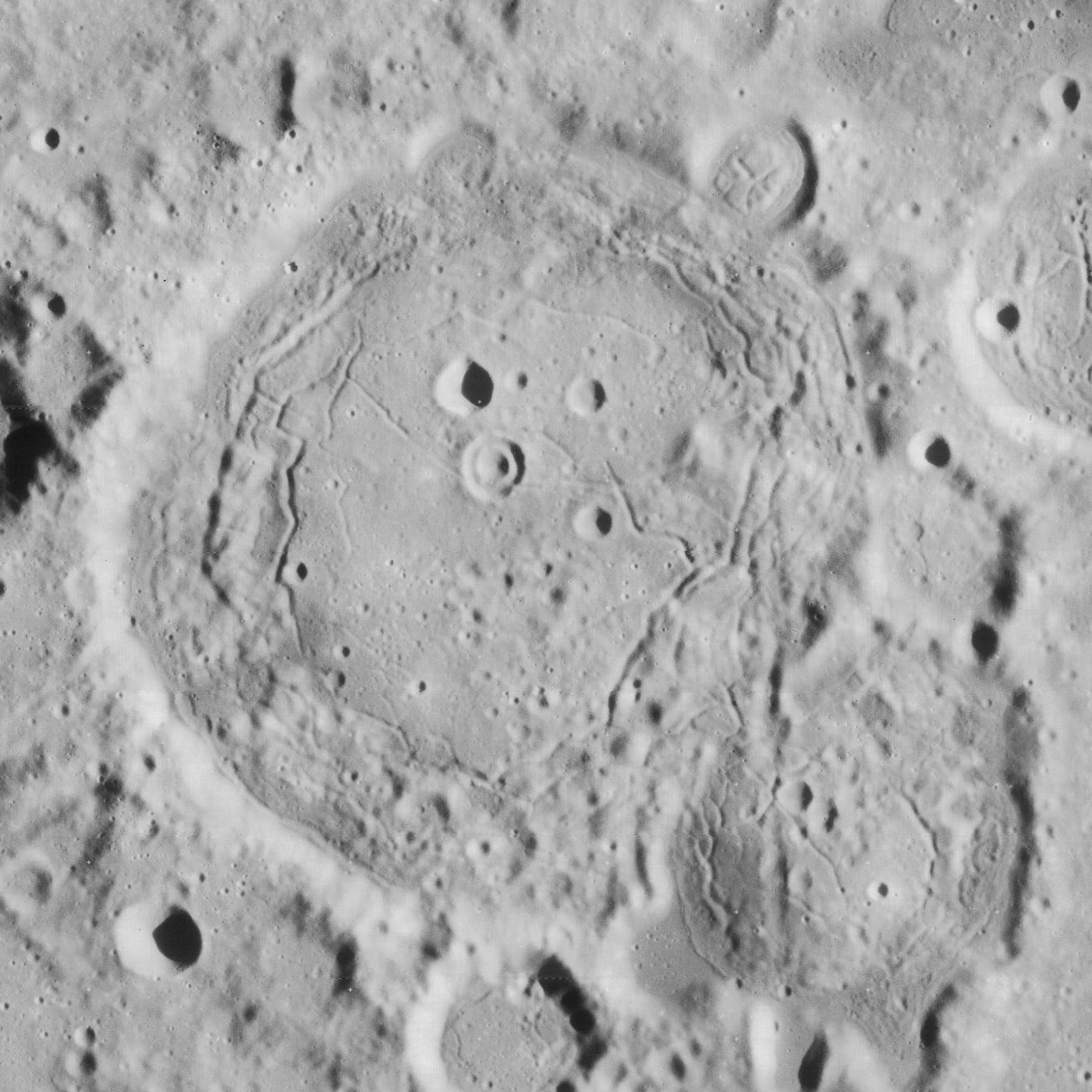
Lavoisier

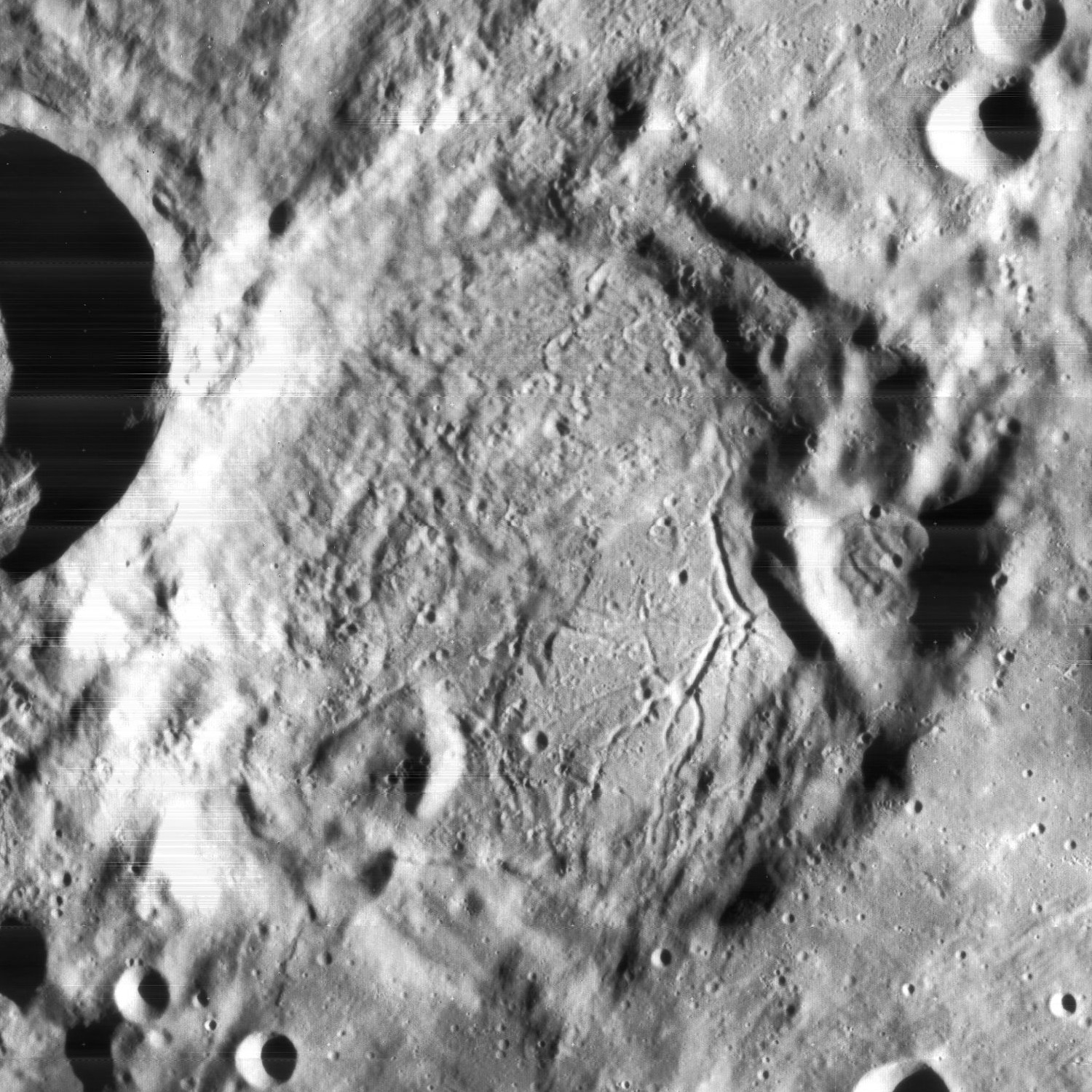
Olbers

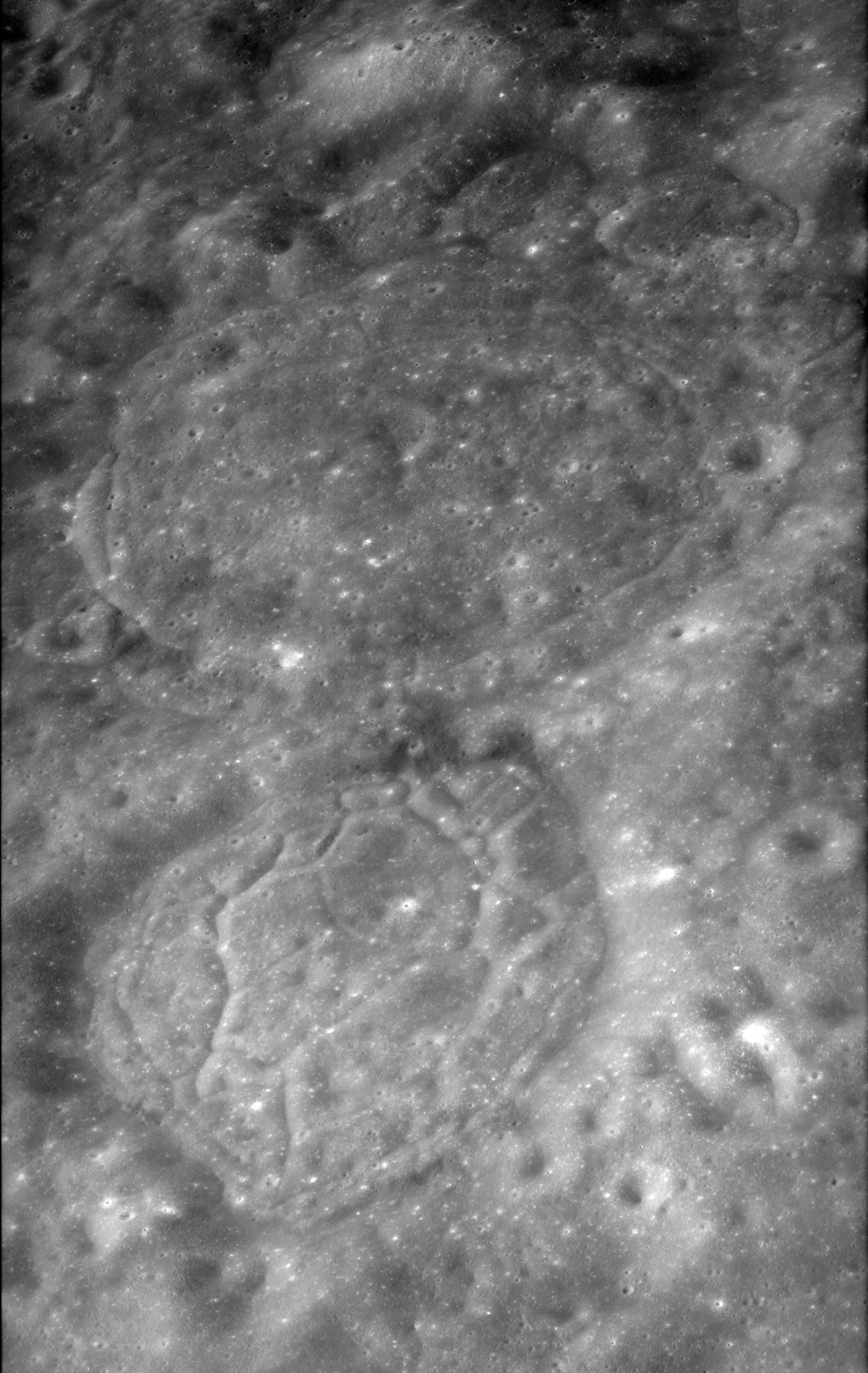
Tamm (top) and van den Bos (bottom)

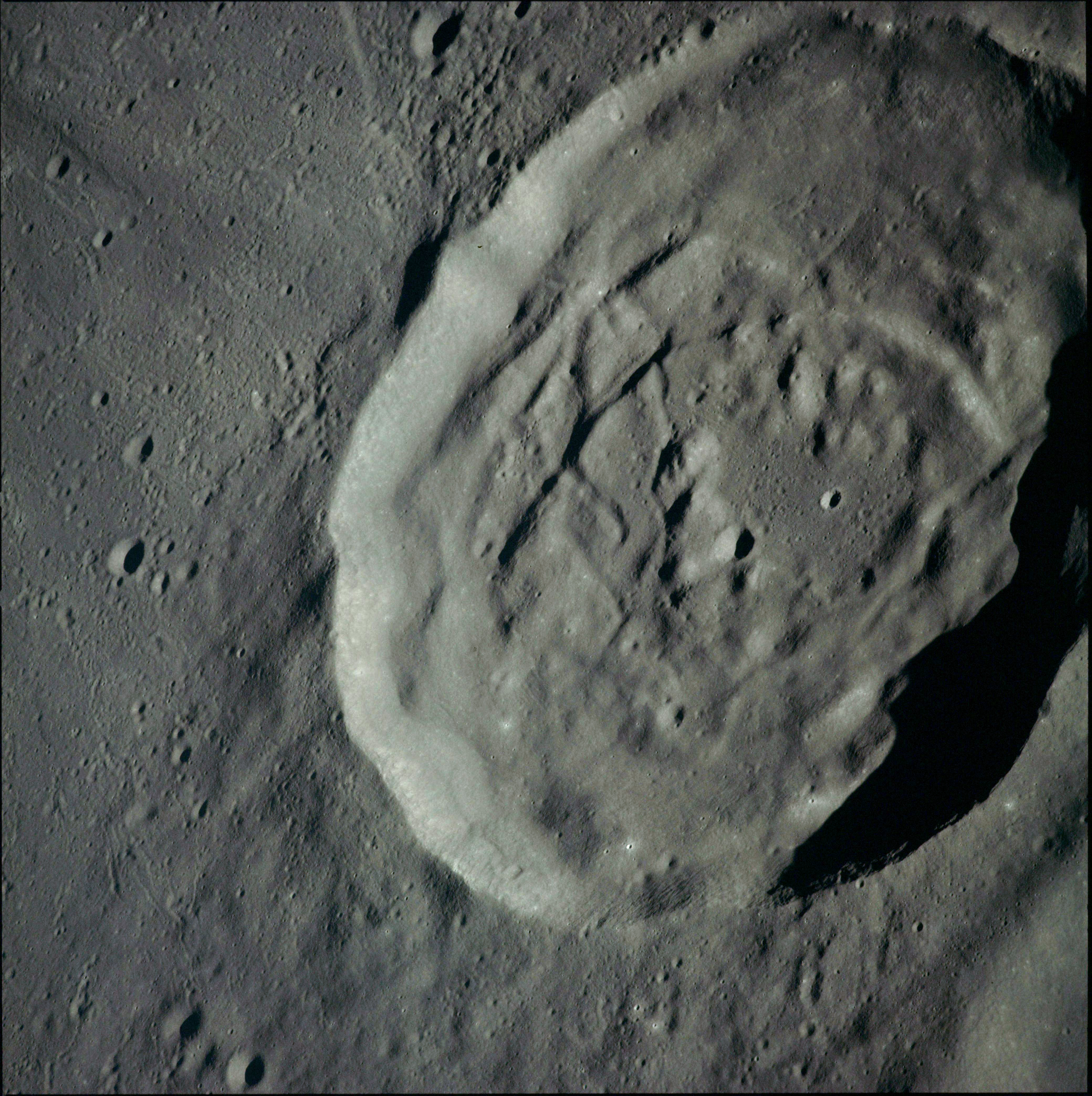
Ritter

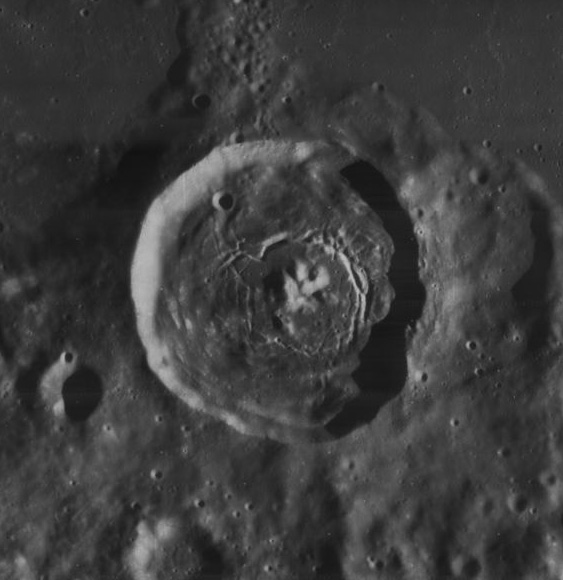
Vitello

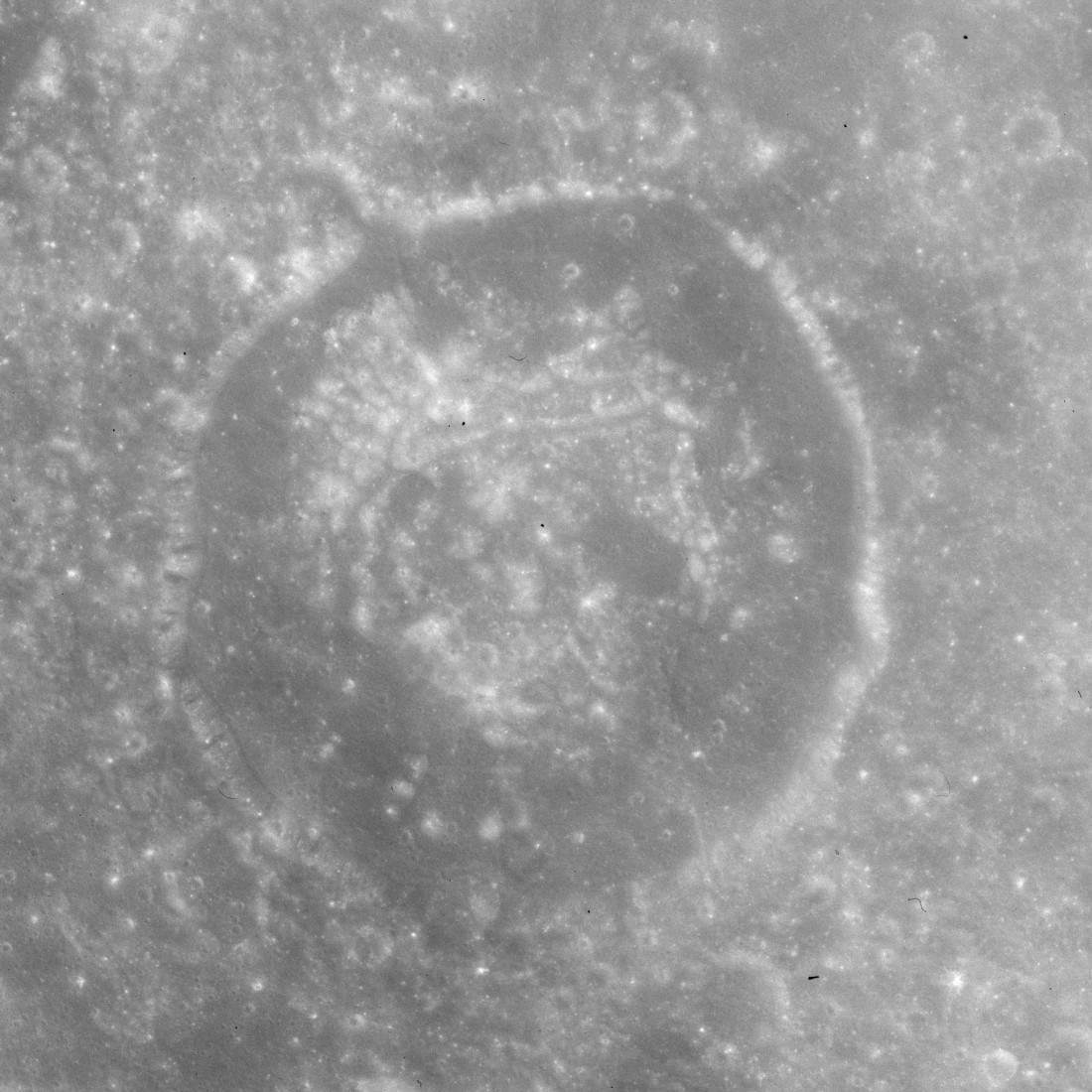
Warner

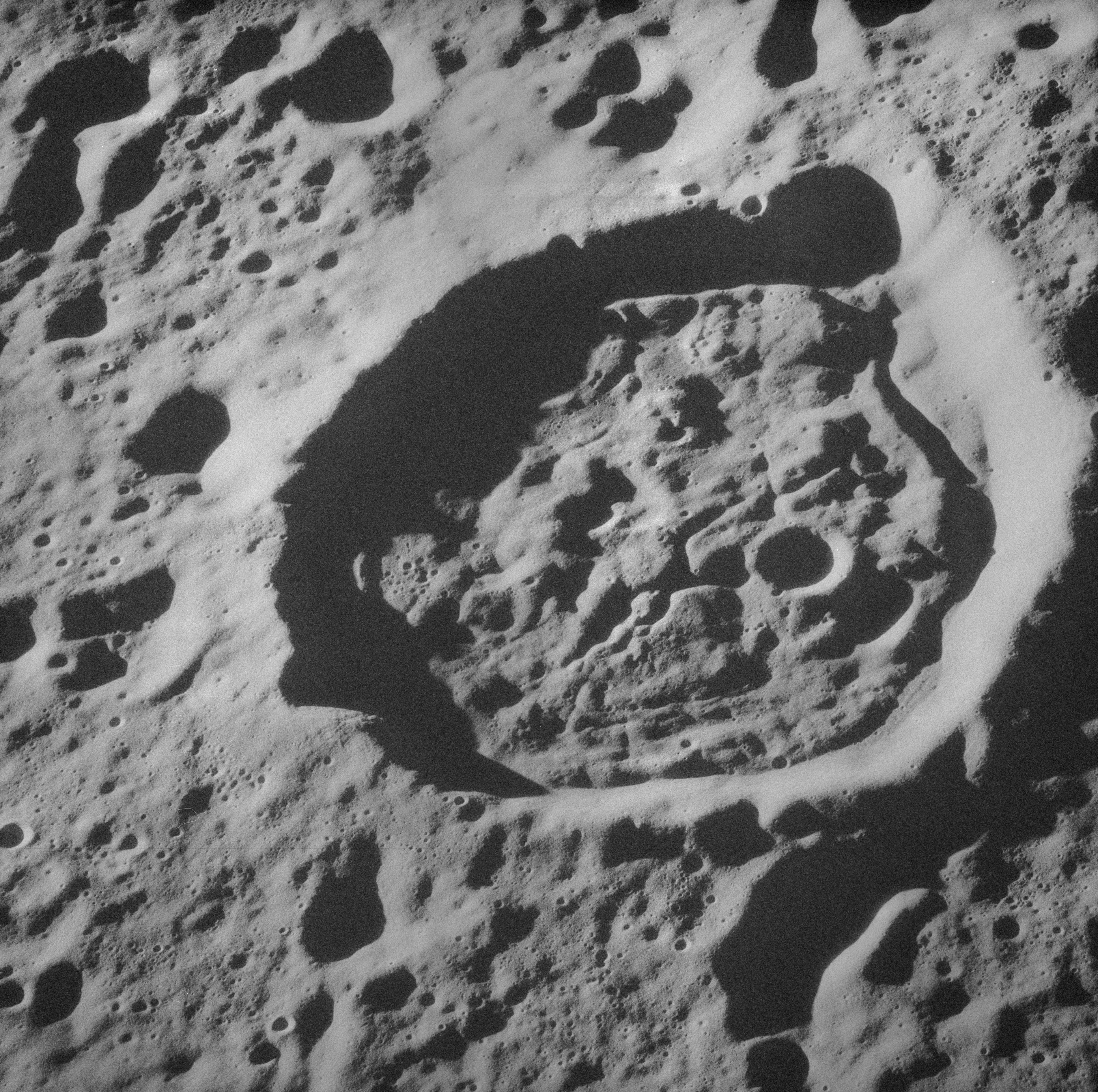
Zwicky N
