= Bunsen (crater) =

Crater on the Moon

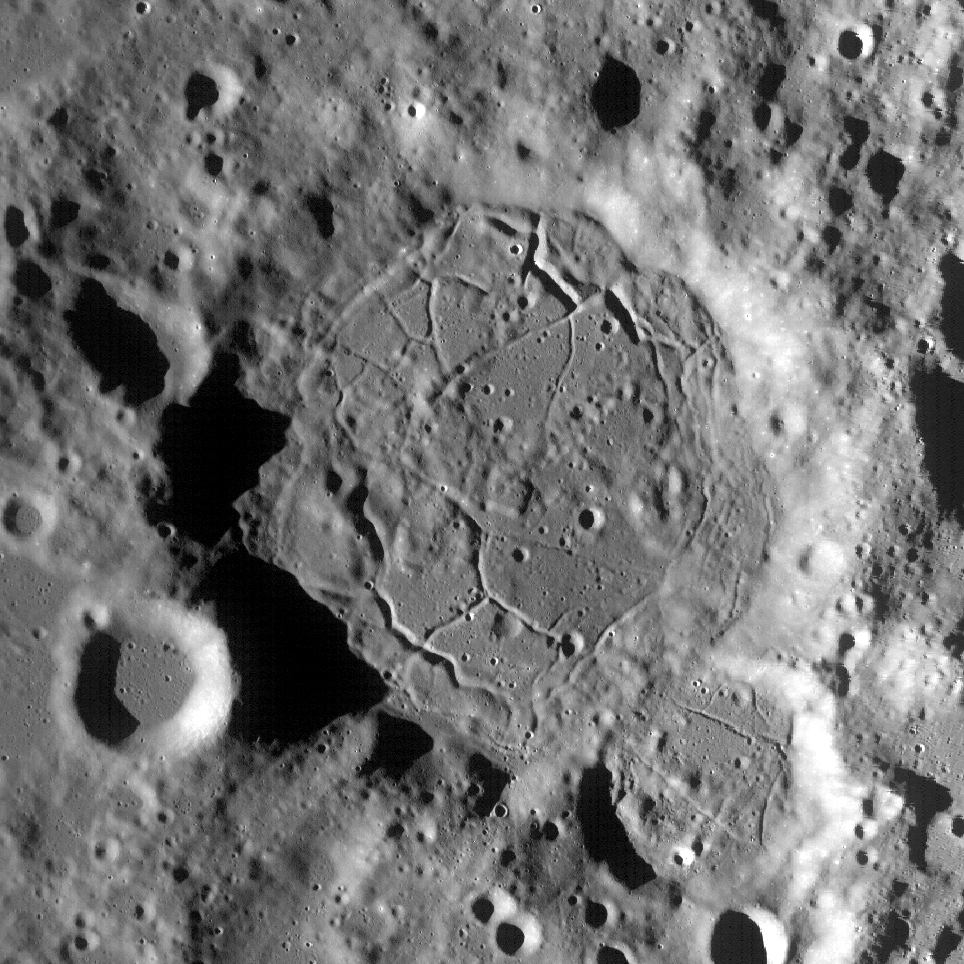
- Lunar Reconnaissance Orbiter image
- Coordinates: 41.40°N 85.46°W
- Diameter: 55.22 km (34.31 mi)
- Depth: Unknown
- Colongitude: 86° at sunrise
- Eponym: Robert W. Bunsen

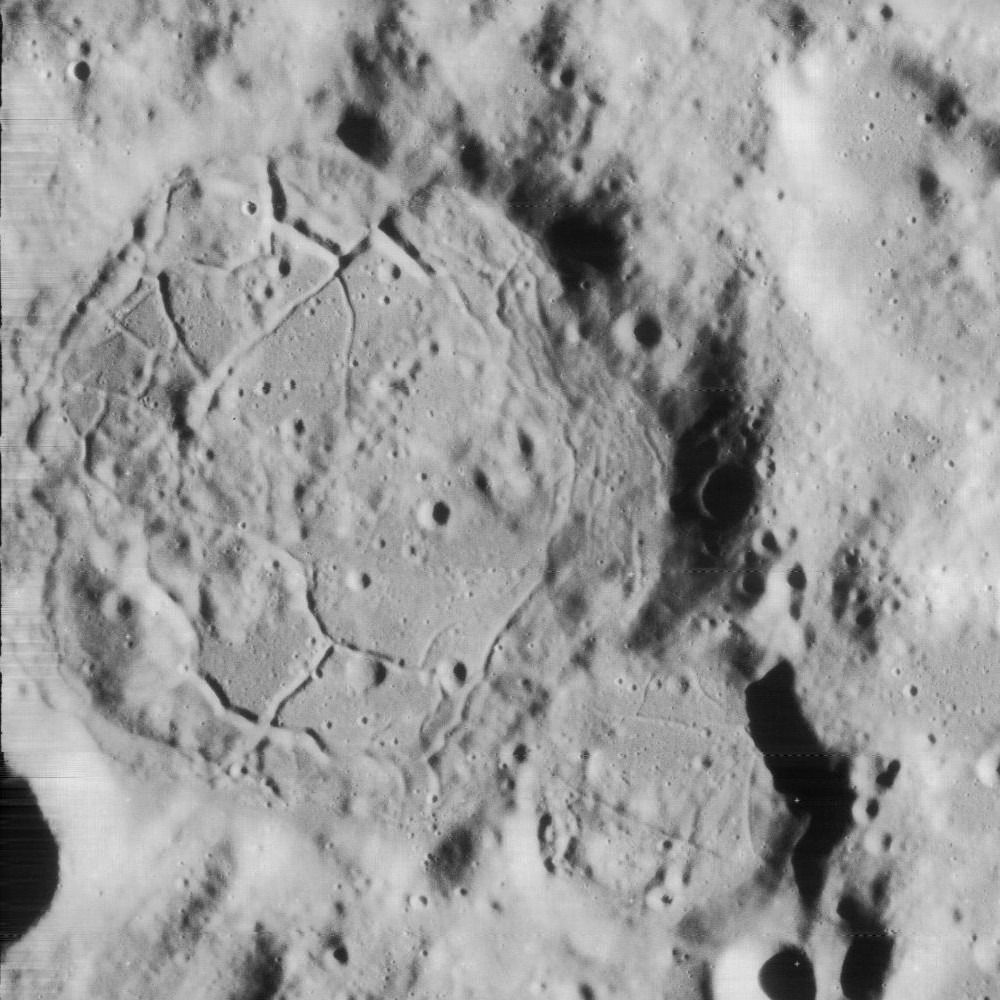
Lunar Orbiter 4 image

Bunsen is a lunar impact crater that lies near the northwestern limb of the Moon. It is located to the west of the Oceanus Procellarum and the crater von Braun. To the southeast is the crater Lavoisier, and to the northeast lies Gerard. Northwest of Bunsen, on the far side of the Moon, is McLaughlin. Due to its position this crater appears foreshortened when viewed from the Earth, and its visibility is affected by libration.

This crater has become considerably worn and eroded by subsequent impacts, leaving a formation that has been described as disintegrated. The most intact portion of the rim is along the northeastern side. There is a smaller, crater-like formation intruding into the southeastern rim. Within the crater, the floor is pitted by tiny impacts, and has a fracture system of criss-crossing clefts near the northern and southern rims. There is a low ridge near the southwest corner of the interior.

This crater is named after German chemist Robert W. Bunsen (1811–1899). His name was introduced into lunar nomenclature by David W. G. Arthur and Ewen Whitaker with the Rectified Lunar Atlas (1963). Its designation was formally adopted by the IAU in 1964.

== Satellite craters ==
By convention these features are identified on lunar maps by placing the letter on the side of the crater midpoint that is closest to Bunsen.

Bunsen	Latitude	Longitude	Diameter
A	43.2° N	88.9° W	39 km
B	44.2° N	88.2° W	20 km
C	44.2° N	90.0° W	18 km
D	40.9° N	86.9° W	14 km

An unnamed crater underlying Bunsen A, B, and C was called Crater 109.
