= Johann Gottlieb Friedrich von Bohnenberger =

German astronomer

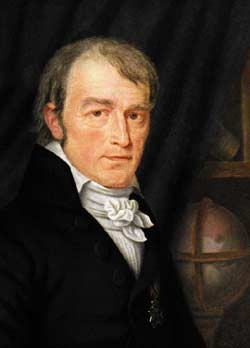
Johann Gottlieb Friedrich von Bohnenberger.

Johann Gottlieb Friedrich von Bohnenberger (5 June 1765 – 19 April 1831) was a German astronomer born at Simmozheim, Württemberg. He studied at the University of Tübingen. In 1798, he was appointed professor of mathematics and astronomy at the university.

He published:

- Anleitung zur geographischen Ortsbestimmung (Guide to geographic locations), 1795
- Astronomie (Astronomy), 1811
- Anfangsgründe der höhern Analysis (Initial reasons of higher analysis), 1812.

In 1817, he systematically explained the design and use of a gyroscope apparatus which he called simply a “Machine.” Several examples of the 'Machine' were constructed by Johann Wilhelm Gottlob Buzengeiger of Tübingen. Johann Friedrich Benzenberg had already mentioned Bohnenberger's invention (describing it at length) in several letters beginning in 1810.

Bohnenberger died at Tübingen.

The lunar crater Bohnenberger is named after him.

== See also ==
- Bohnenberger electrometer
- Kater's pendulum
