= Gerard (crater) =

Crater on the Moon

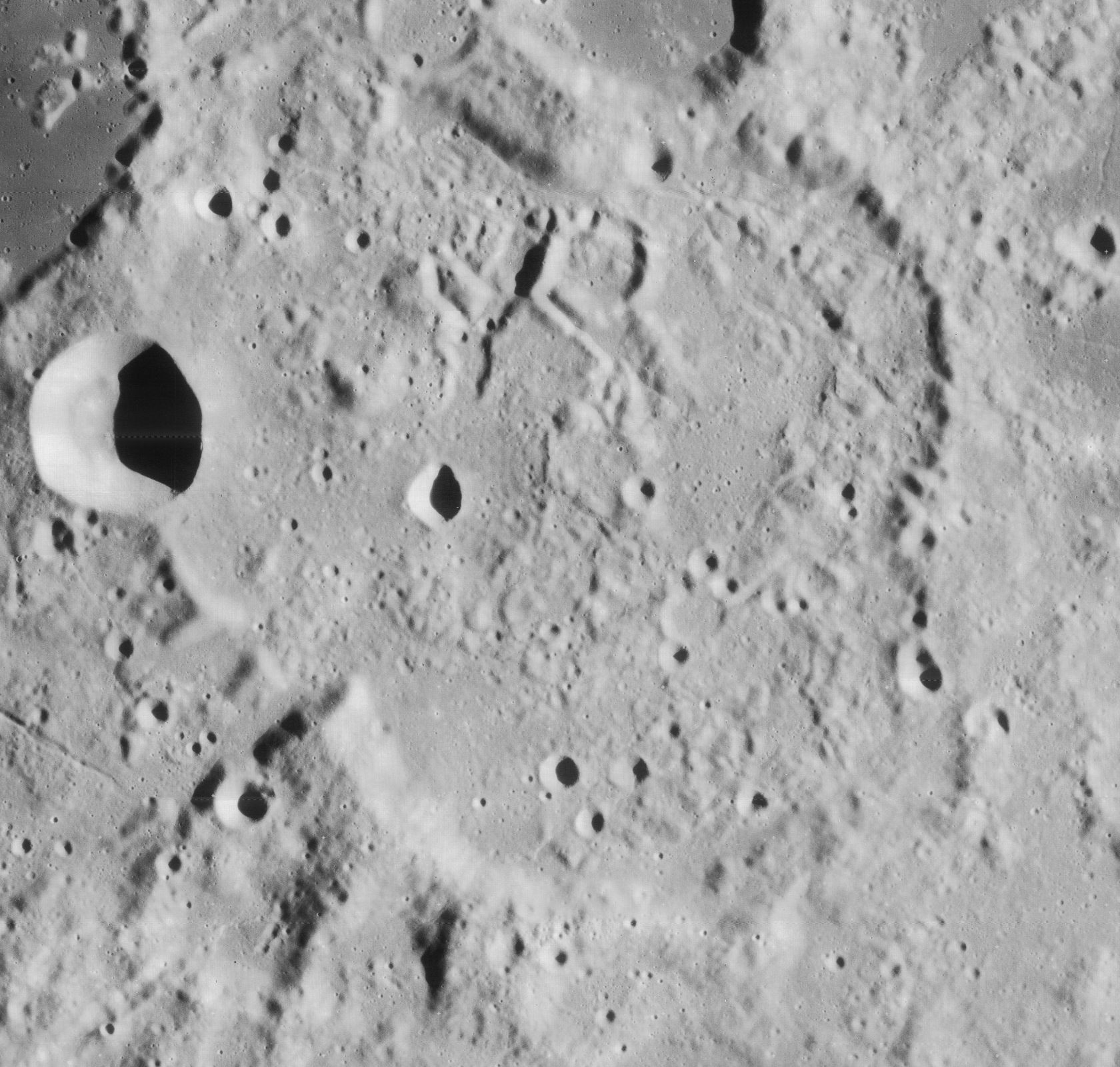
- Lunar Orbiter 4 image centered on Gerard. Gerard A is the smaller crater at left.
- Coordinates: 44.5°N 80.0°W
- Diameter: 98.78 km
- Depth: 2.2 km
- Colongitude: 82° at sunrise
- Eponym: Alexander Gerard

Gerard is a lunar impact crater that lies along the western edge of the Oceanus Procellarum near the northwest limb of the Moon's near side. It is located to the north-northwest of the crater von Braun, and northeast of Bunsen. Because of its location, Gerard appears strongly foreshortened when viewed from the Earth, hindering observation.

This is a worn and eroded formation with a rim that has been nearly obliterated in some locations and distorted in others. The northern half of the rim has outward bulges to the northeast, north, and northwest. The interior floor is rough in places, with several small and tiny craters along the floor and the eastern rim.

To the northwest of this formation is the unusual Gerard Q Inner (eastern floor covered in dark-hued basaltic lava) within the larger Gerard Q Outer, and a system of rilles named the Rimae Gerard. These extend for a distance of about 100 kilometers. Like many craters in this region of the moon (such as Von Braun and Bunsen), the floor of Gerard Q Inner is fractured.

== Satellite craters ==
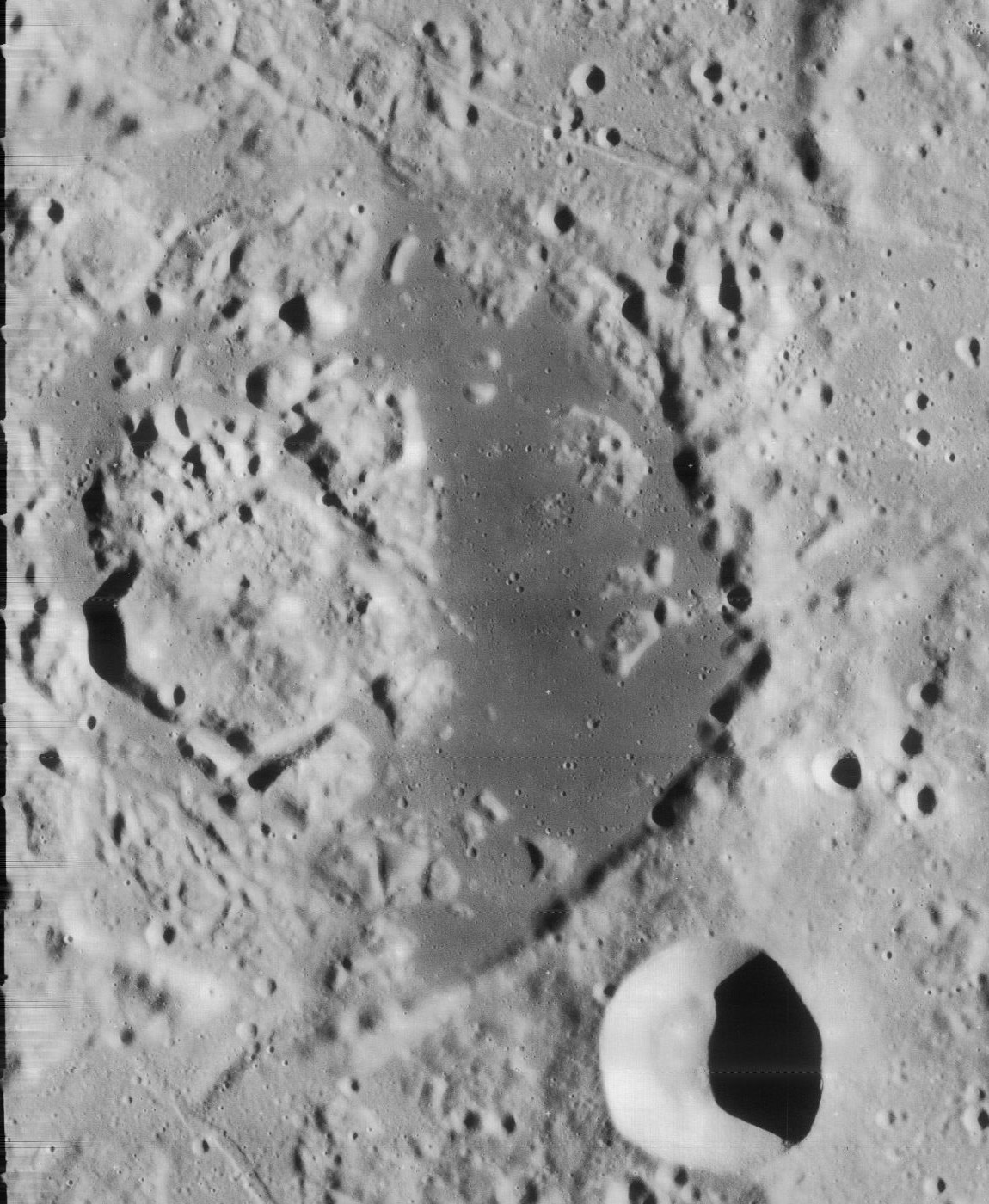
Gerard Q Inner, to the northwest of Gerard

By convention these features are identified on lunar maps by placing the letter on the side of the crater midpoint that is closest to Gerard.

Gerard	Latitude	Longitude	Diameter
A	45.1° N	82.3° W	17.31 km
B	46.4° N	88.3° W	14.04 km
C	45.9° N	79.2° W	29.36 km
D	46.2° N	79.9° W	5.93 km
E	44.5° N	81.0° W	5.28 km
F	43.8° N	82.3° W	5.39 km
G	45.7° N	88.3° W	26.9 km
H	44.5° N	87.0° W	12.25 km
J	46.9° N	88.7° W	9.35 km
K	44.0° N	77.2° W	5.85 km
L	43.2° N	76.4° W	4.5 km
Q Inner	46.54° N	83.13° W	67.32 km
Q Outer	46.51° N	84.55° W	192.48 km
