= Einstein (crater) =

Lunar surface depression

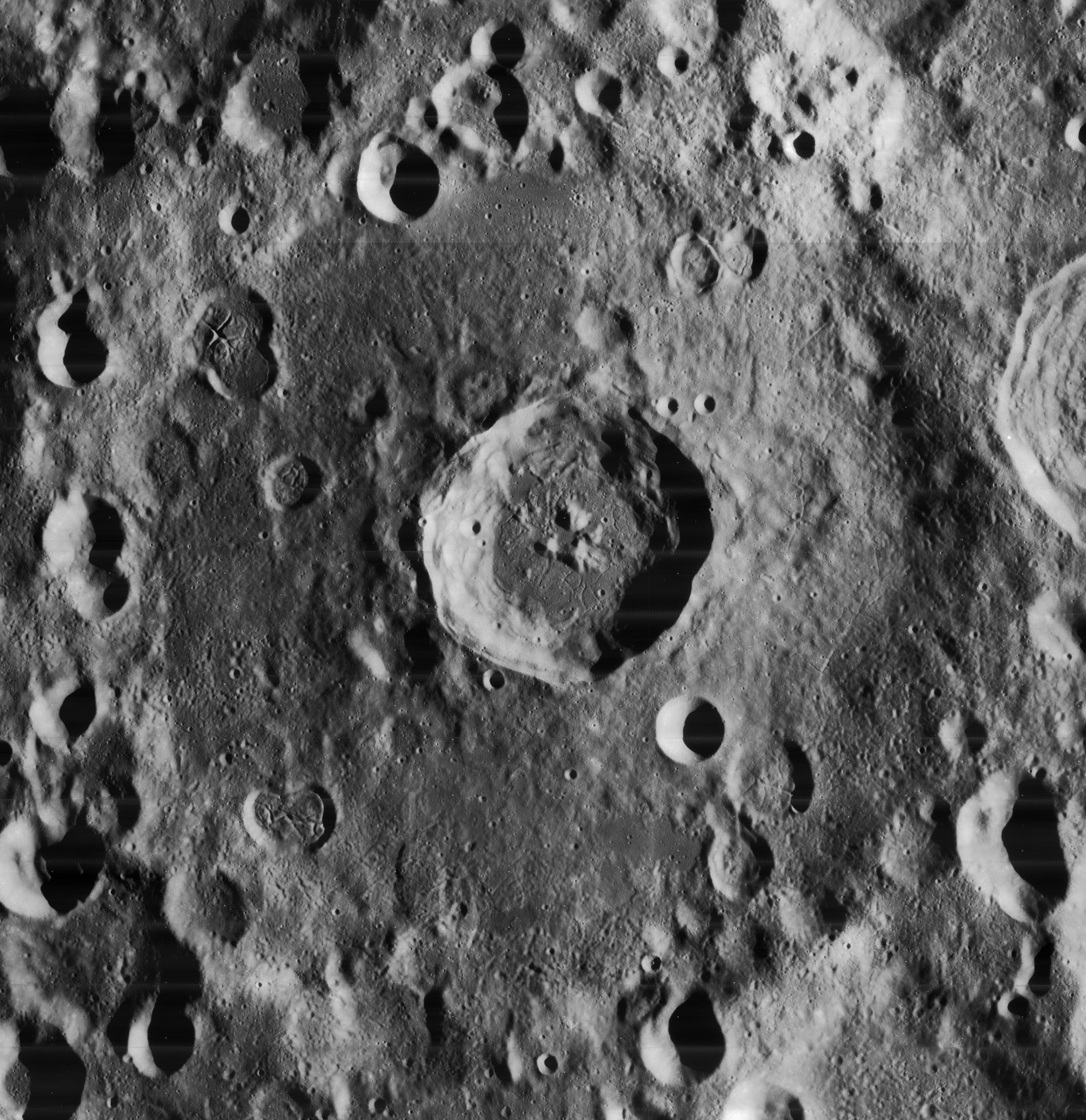
- Lunar Orbiter 4 image. Einstein is the larger, eroded crater. The smaller central crater is Einstein A.
- Coordinates: 16.60°N 88.65°W
- Diameter: 181.47 km (112.76 mi)
- Depth: Unknown
- Colongitude: 91° at sunrise
- Formation: Pre-Nectarian
- Eponym: Albert Einstein

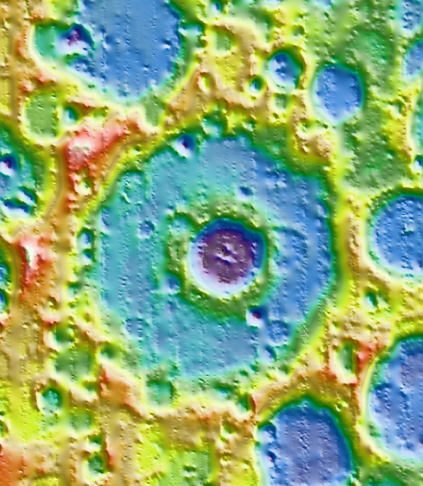
Topographic map. Red means highlands and blue means lowlands.

Einstein is a large lunar impact crater that lies along the western limb of the Moon, which makes it difficult to observe from the Earth. The visibility of this formation is subject to libration effects, but even under the best conditions not much detail can be observed except from lunar orbit. Nearby craters of note include Moseley just to the north, Dalton along the eastern rim, Vasco da Gama just to the southeast, and Bohr to the south-southeast. The formation Vallis Bohr is visible to the south.

This formation dates to the Pre-Nectarian period of the lunar geologic timescale. The outer rim of this walled plain has been strongly degraded by many smaller impacts. Along the northeast rim is an impact with a high albedo skirt. Occupying the center of the interior floor is Einstein A, an impact crater with terraced inner walls and a central peak. The outer rampart of this concentric crater spreads across the interior floor, covering over half the diameter of Einstein. Several smaller craters also lie scattered across the floor, but there are sections of relatively flat surface in the southwest part of the floor. Two small craters on the west side have fractured floors. These are believed to be secondary craters from the Orientale impact to the south.

The widespread notion that this crater was discovered by Patrick Moore in 1939 is probably erroneous. In the middle of the 20th century Hugh Percy Wilkins designated the crater Caramuel to honor Juan Caramuel y Lobkowitz. The crater was known under this unofficial name for some time, but neither this name, nor almost all of Wilkins' other nomenclature, were adopted by the International Astronomical Union (IAU). In 1963 E. Whitaker and D.W.G. Arthur named this crater Einstein after German physicist Albert Einstein (1879–1955), and in 1964 this name was adopted by the IAU. Wilkins' map also contained a crater called Einstein, but it is a less prominent one – Simpelius D.

== Satellite craters ==
By convention these features are identified on lunar maps by placing the letter on the side of the crater midpoint that is closest to Einstein.

Einstein	Coordinates	Diameter
A	16.69°N 88.25°W	50 km
R	13.83°N 91.88°W	20 km
S	15.10°N 91.67°W	20 km

On August 5, 2026, a discarded Falcon 9 upper stage was expected to impact the Moon near the Einstein crater. The impact site was captured by images from the Danuri lunar orbiter on August 7.

== See also ==
- 2001 Einstein, minor planet
