= Vallis Bohr =

Lunar surface depression

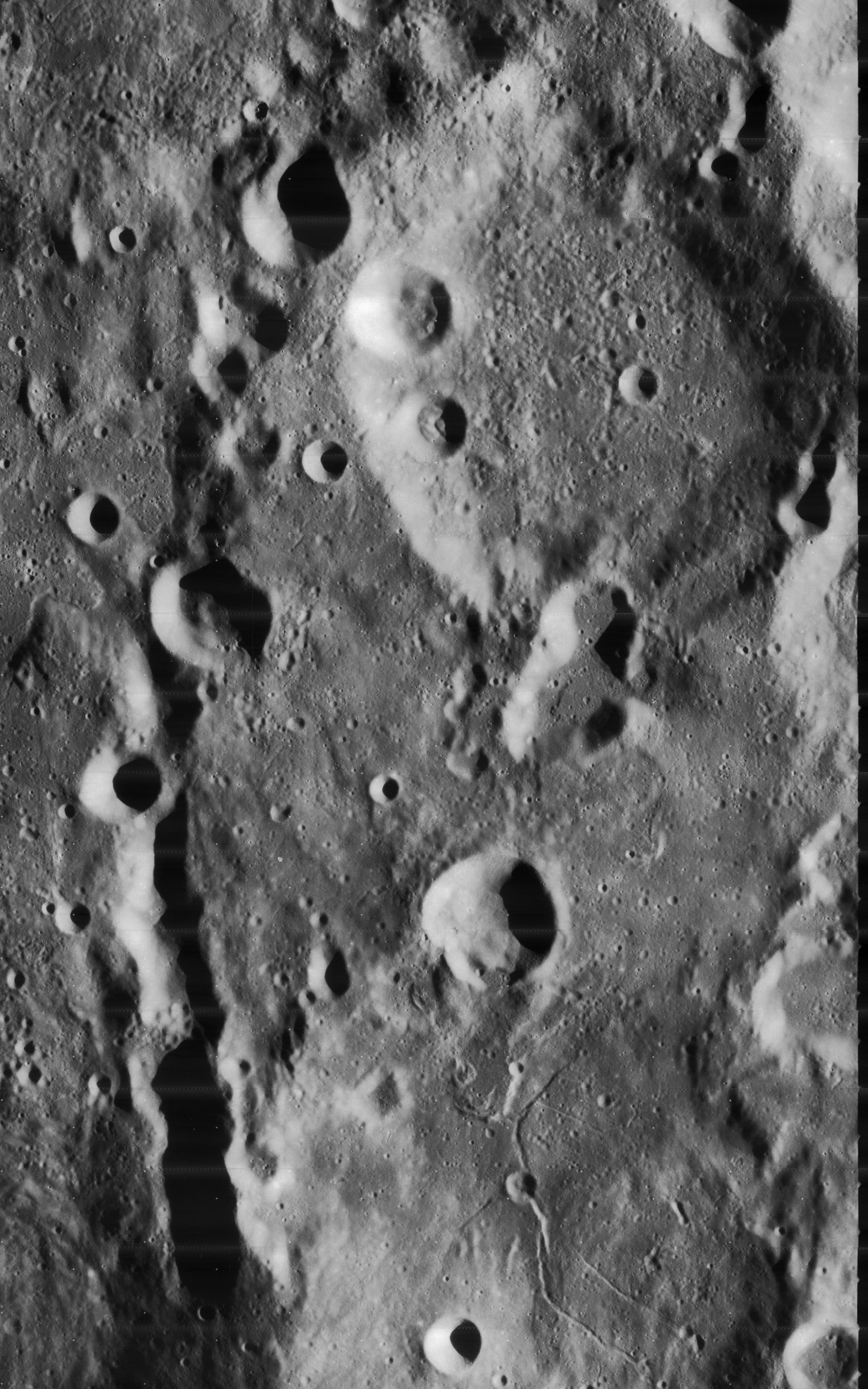
Bohr crater in upper right and Vallis Bohr in lower left

Vallis Bohr is a valley on the Moon stretching due south of the crater Einstein. This wide cleft has a length of about 80 kilometers, and is radial to the Mare Orientale impact basin further to the south. The selenographic coordinates of this feature are 12.4°N 86.6°W.

Vallis Bohr is a chain of secondary craters from the Orientale impact to the south.
