= Bohr (crater) =

Lunar surface depression

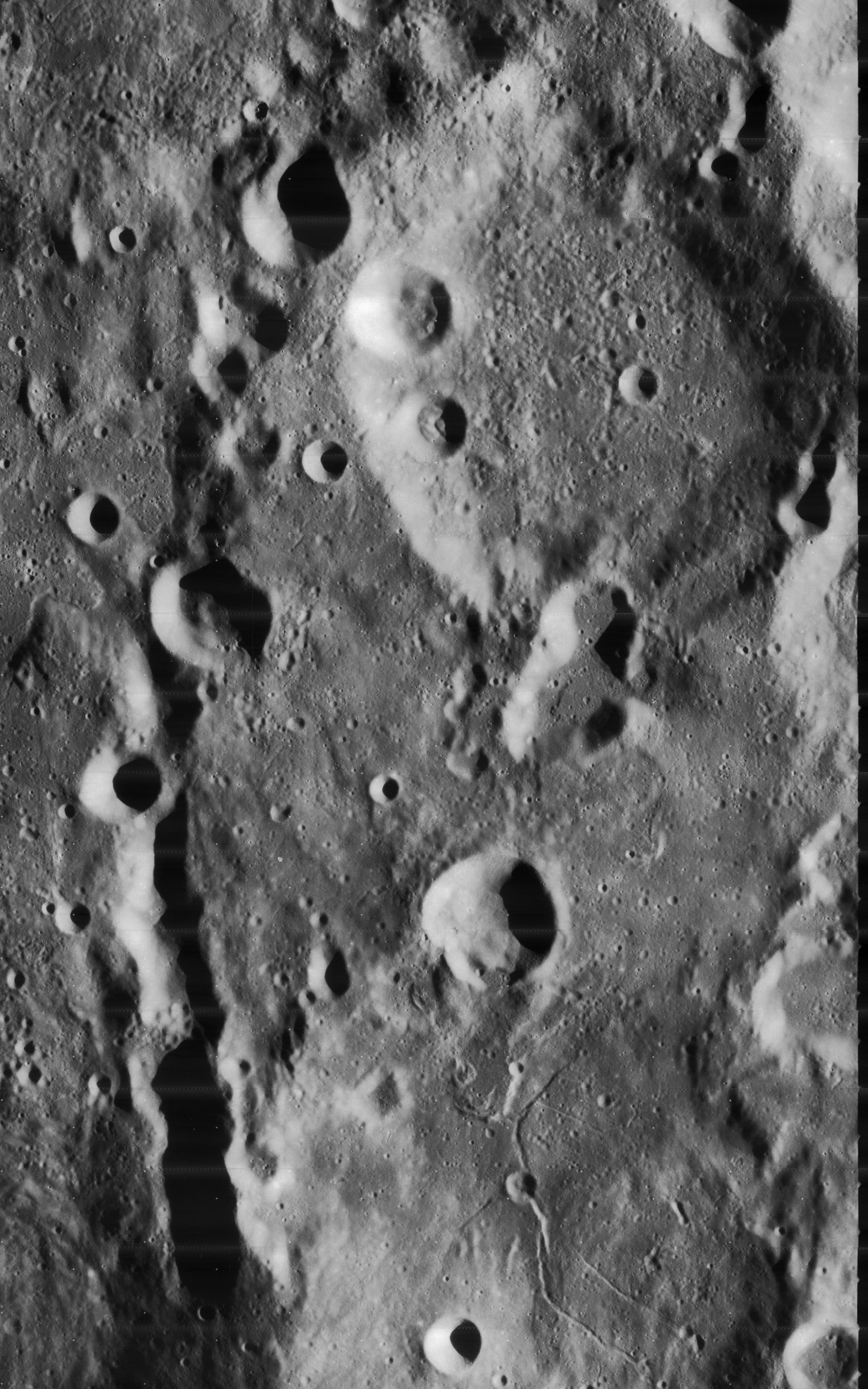
- Lunar Orbiter 4 image, with Bohr crater in upper right and Vallis Bohr in lower left
- Coordinates: 12.8°N 86.4°W
- Diameter: 70.07 km (43.54 mi)
- Depth: Unknown
- Colongitude: 87° at sunrise
- Formation: Nectarian
- Eponym: Niels Bohr

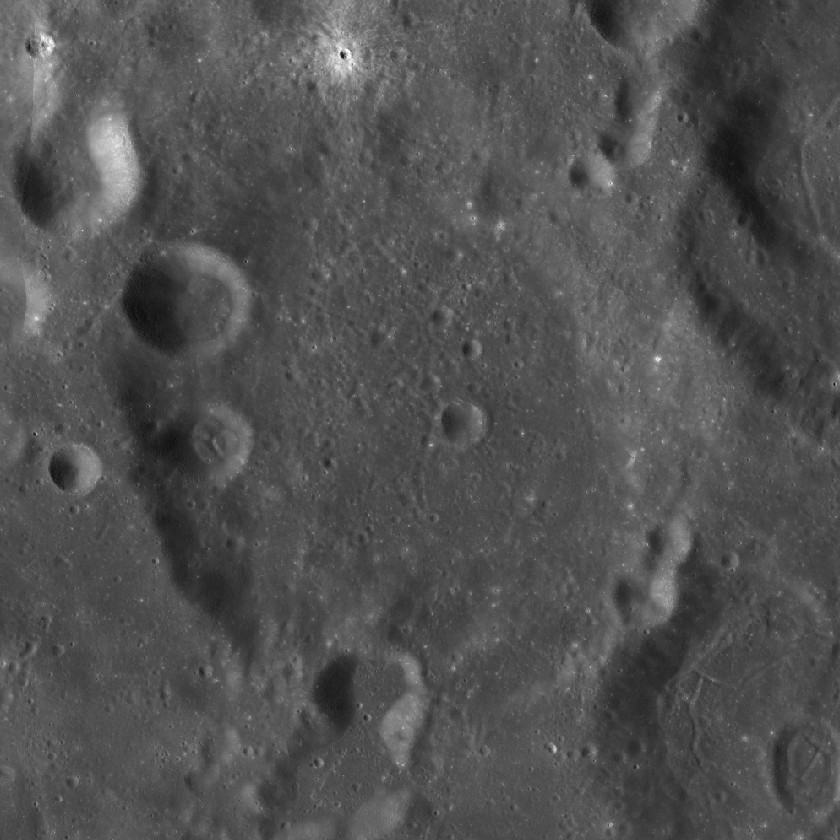
LRO mosaic

Bohr is a lunar impact crater that is located along the western lunar limb, in the area that is affected by librations. It is attached to the southwestern rim of the larger, eroded Vasco da Gama formation, and to the southeast of the degraded crater Einstein.

This formation is dated to the Nectarian period of the lunar geologic timescale. The rim of Bohr is worn and eroded, and a pair of small, bowl-shaped craters lies across the western inner wall. The rim to the northeast has been shored up by the adjacent Vasco da Gama, but the remainder forms an irregular ring of rugged ground. To the southwest of Bohr is Vallis Bohr, a valley trending in a north–south direction. This long cleft is associated with the formation of the Mare Orientale farther to the south.

This crater is named after Danish physicist Niels Bohr (1885-1962), the 1922 Nobel laurette in Physics. The name was introduced into lunar nomenclature by David W. G. Arthur and Ewen Whitaker with the Rectified Lunar Atlas (1963). Its designation was formally adopted by the International Astronomical Union in 1964.
