= Johann Wilhelm Gottlob Buzengeiger =

Johann Wilhelm Gottlob Buzengeiger (born 25 June 1778 in Tübingen and died there on 26 October 1836 as well) was a university mechanic, optician and watchmaker in Tübingen.

== Life and work ==
Johann Wilhelm Buzengeiger was employed from 1805 to 1836 as a university mechanic at the University of Tübingen. He worked mainly for the astronomer and mathematician Johann Gottlieb Friedrich von Bohnenberger (1765-1831), but also had a watchmaker's workshop in Tübingen. He sold his instruments internationally outside of the Kingdom of Württemberg, e.g. to Heinrich Christian Schumacher (1780-1850) in Altona. Due to the regular use of mercury, he had some health problems.

For the survey planned by Bohnenberger, he made in 1818 replicas of the Toise du Pérou and a heliostat to a design by Carl Friedrich Gauss, a gyroscope as an astronomical demonstration object (1817), a reversion pendulum for accurate calculation of gravity (1811) as well as an electroscope invented by Bohnenberger for determining the electric charge. He also made barometers, Zamboni piles, for instance as an energy source of a clock, an astronomical pendulum, very accurate clocks and a fine scale for the chemist Christian Gottlob Gmelin (1792-1860).
