= 2026 SpaceX lunar impact =

Crash of rocket into the Moon

Before/after images of the crater taken by the Narrow-Angle Camera on the Lunar Reconnaissance Orbiter.

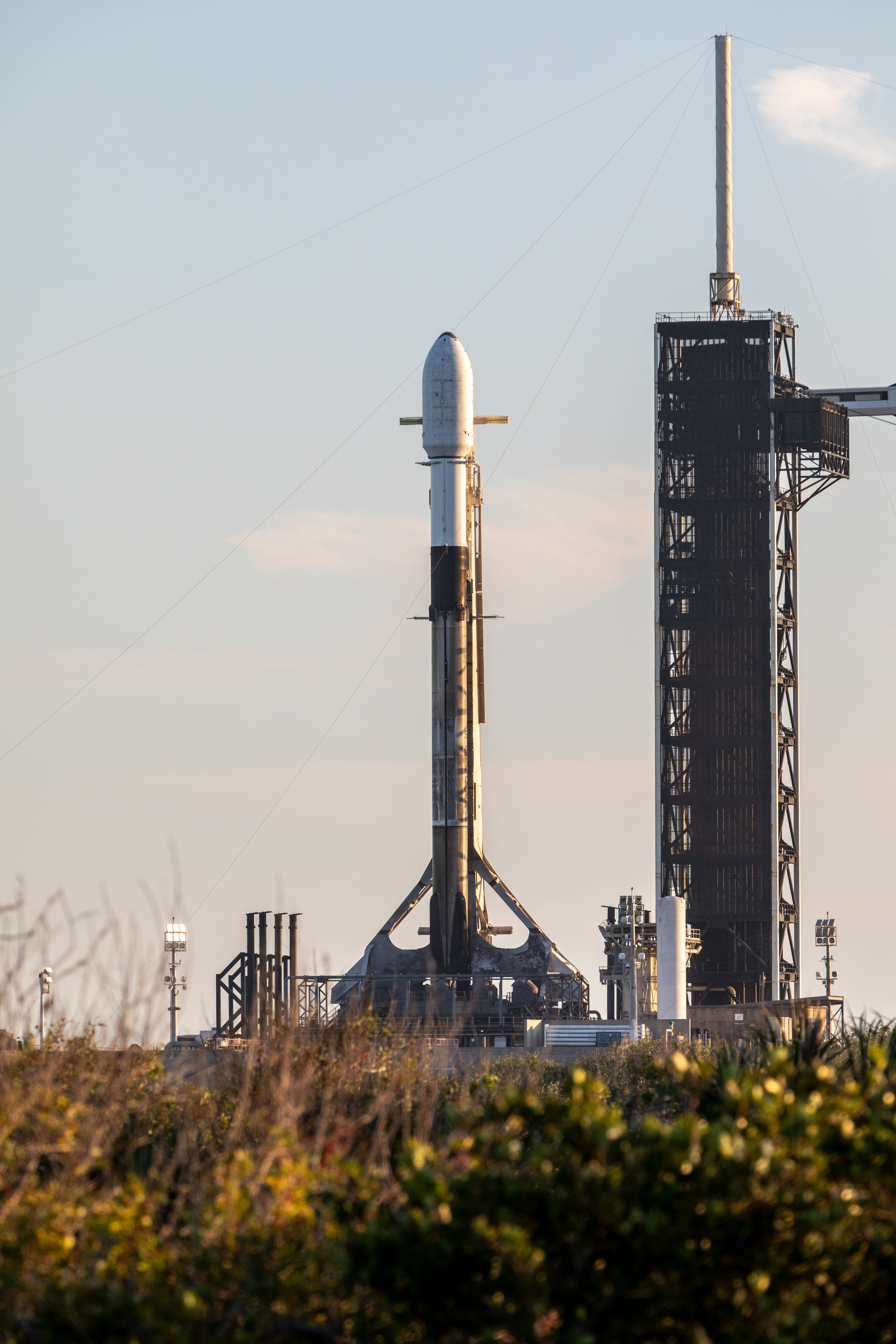
The complete rocket on its launch pad, the cylindrical second stage of which crashed on the Moon.

The spent upper stage (COSPAR ID 2025-010D) of a SpaceX Falcon 9 rocket collided with the Moon near Einstein Crater on 5 August 2026. The 3,900-kilogram (8,600 lb) spacecraft had been abandoned the previous year in a Moon-crossing high Earth orbit after delivering two lunar landers: Blue Ghost-1 and Hakuto-R Mission 2. The crash, which was not planned, is humanity's third known (or presumed) unintentional lunar impact of a rocket body, after the third stage that delivered Luna 2 in 1959 and the upper stage of the Chinese Lunar Exploration Program's Chang'e 5-T1 mission on the far side of the Moon in 2022.

This crash posed no danger to satellites and other space assets, but renewed attention to space law about space junk and space archaeology and to the larger context of the Second Space Race.

== Prelude ==
The spent rocket had been observed many times since it was abandoned, and in September 2025, it was predicted to hit the moon in August 2026.

As of 31 July 2026, the time of impact was estimated to be 06:35 UTC, with a margin of error of a few minutes. The impact speed was expected to be about 8,700 kilometres (5,400 mi) per hour and the explosion to be equivalent to 3 tons of TNT (1.3×10^{10} J). NASA calculated that the crater would be about 18 metres (59 ft) wide and 4 metres (13 ft) deep. There was a slim possibility that the flash—lasting less than a second—would be visible via telescope from the eastern United States and much of South America.

== Impact ==
This prediction was accurate to the minute. No visual observations were reported of the impact itself, but a plume was detected by its lithium and sodium emission lines for 10 minutes after the predicted time by the Very Large Telescope at the Paranal Observatory in Chile. Scientist Carl Schmidt of Boston University said that he was "100 percent confident" that this signal was caused by the impact. The sodium was thought to have come from the lunar soil while the lithium was more likely to have come from the rocket components.

The orbit of the South Korean lunar observation satellite Danuri was adjusted to take photographs of the crash site, starting 33 minutes before the impact and taking seven more pictures over the next 16 hours from an altitude of around 350 kilometres (220 mi). KASA published photographs on 6 August showing the impact site with splashes of ejecta.

NASA's Lunar Reconnaissance Orbiter (LRO) took images on Aug 11 and 12, which were compared to earlier images to determine the crater location: 19.4759°N, 266.7138°E, 511 meters elevation.

Animation of Falcon 9 RB Booster

Around the Earth

Around the Moon

Around the Moon – Close-up

Falcon 9 RB Booster · Moon · Earth
