= Balboa (lunar crater) =

Lunar surface depression

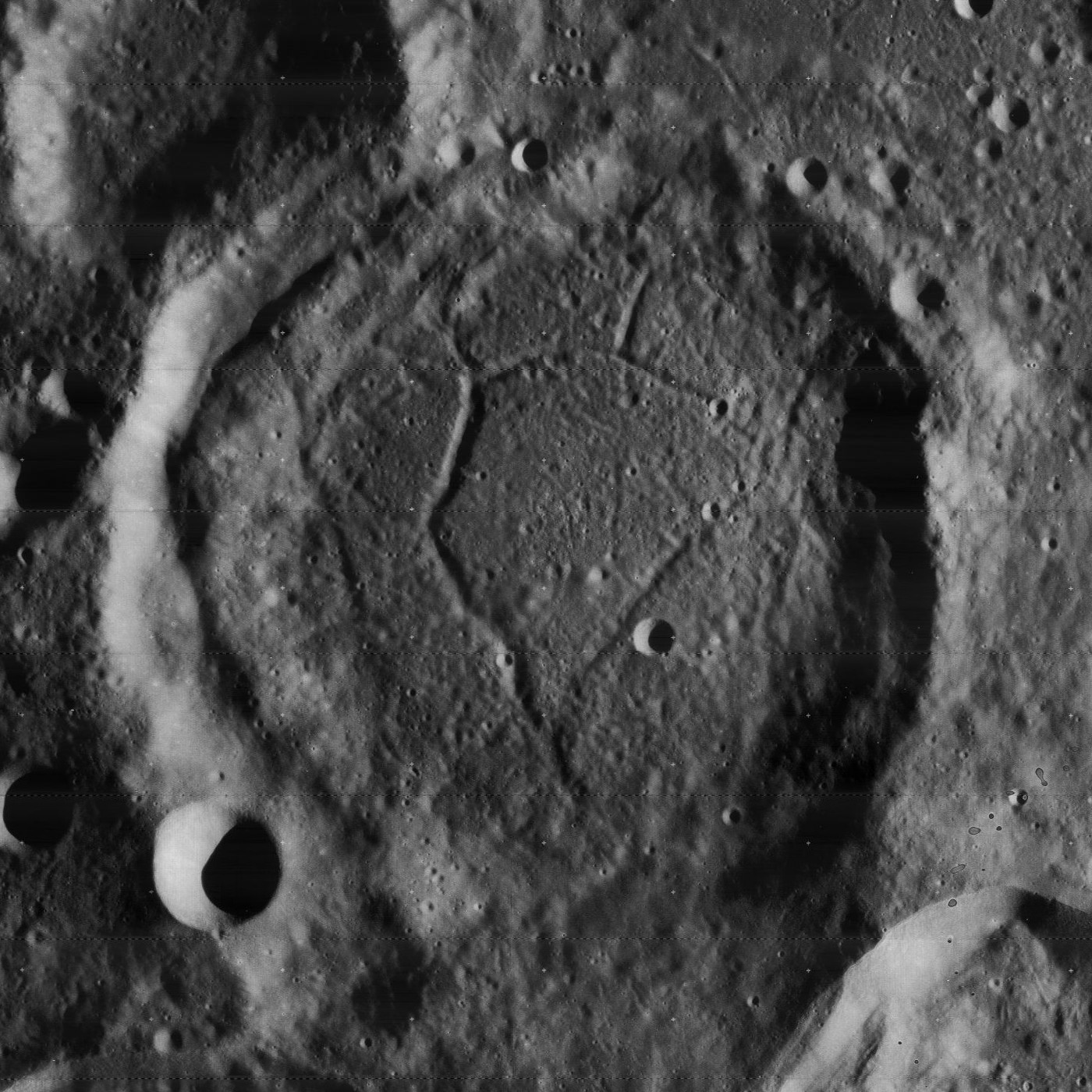
- Lunar Orbiter 4 image
- Coordinates: 19.1°N 83.2°W
- Diameter: 69.19 km (42.99 mi)
- Depth: Unknown
- Colongitude: 84° at sunrise
- Eponym: Vasco N. De Balboa

Balboa is a lunar impact crater that is located near the western limb of the Moon. It is best viewed prior to full Moon during favorable librations. Due to foreshortening, the crater appears highly oval when viewed from the Earth. In actuality, however, the formation is relatively circular. It is comparable in size to the crater Dalton, located just to the southwest. The eastern rim of Balboa lies just to the west of the Oceanus Procellarum.

The rim of Balboa is worn and eroded, with the most intact sections along the eastern and western edges. The crater interior has been flooded with basaltic lava in the past, and the floor is marked fractures. Nearby Dalton and an unnamed crater northwest of satellite crater Balboa B are similarly fractured. Balboa A is a well-formed impact crater located just to the southeast of Balboa, with a sharp, notched rim and an irregular interior. Its diameter is only somewhat smaller than Dalton directly to the west.

The crater Balboa is named after Spanish explorer Vasco N. De Balboa (1475-1519), who was the first European to view the Pacific Ocean from its eastern shores in 1513. Its designation was officially adopted by the International Astronomical Union in 1964. The name was introduced into lunar nomenclature by David W. G. Arthur and Ewen Whitaker with the Rectified Lunar Atlas (1963).

== Satellite craters ==
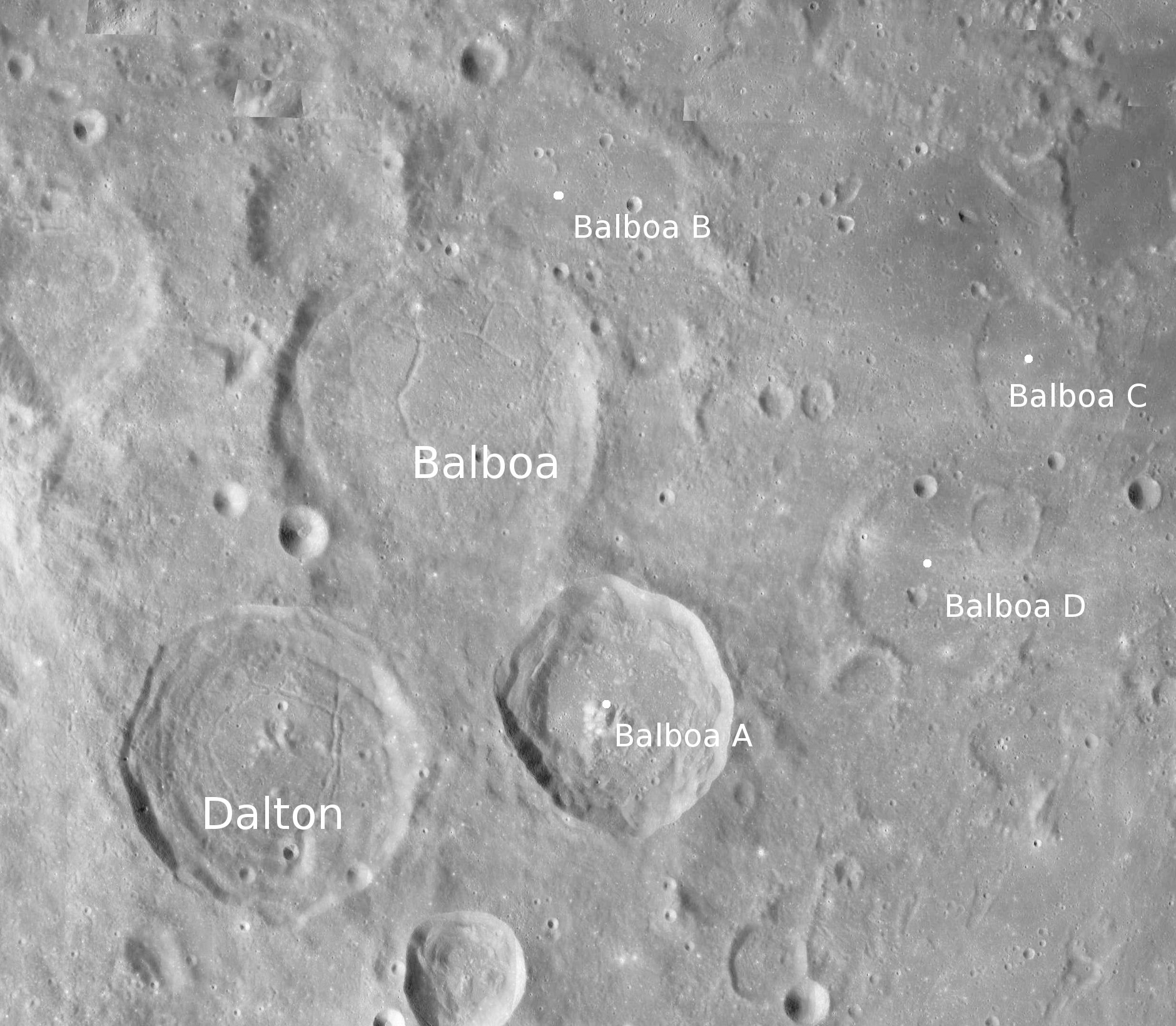
Satellite craters of Balboa, with Dalton

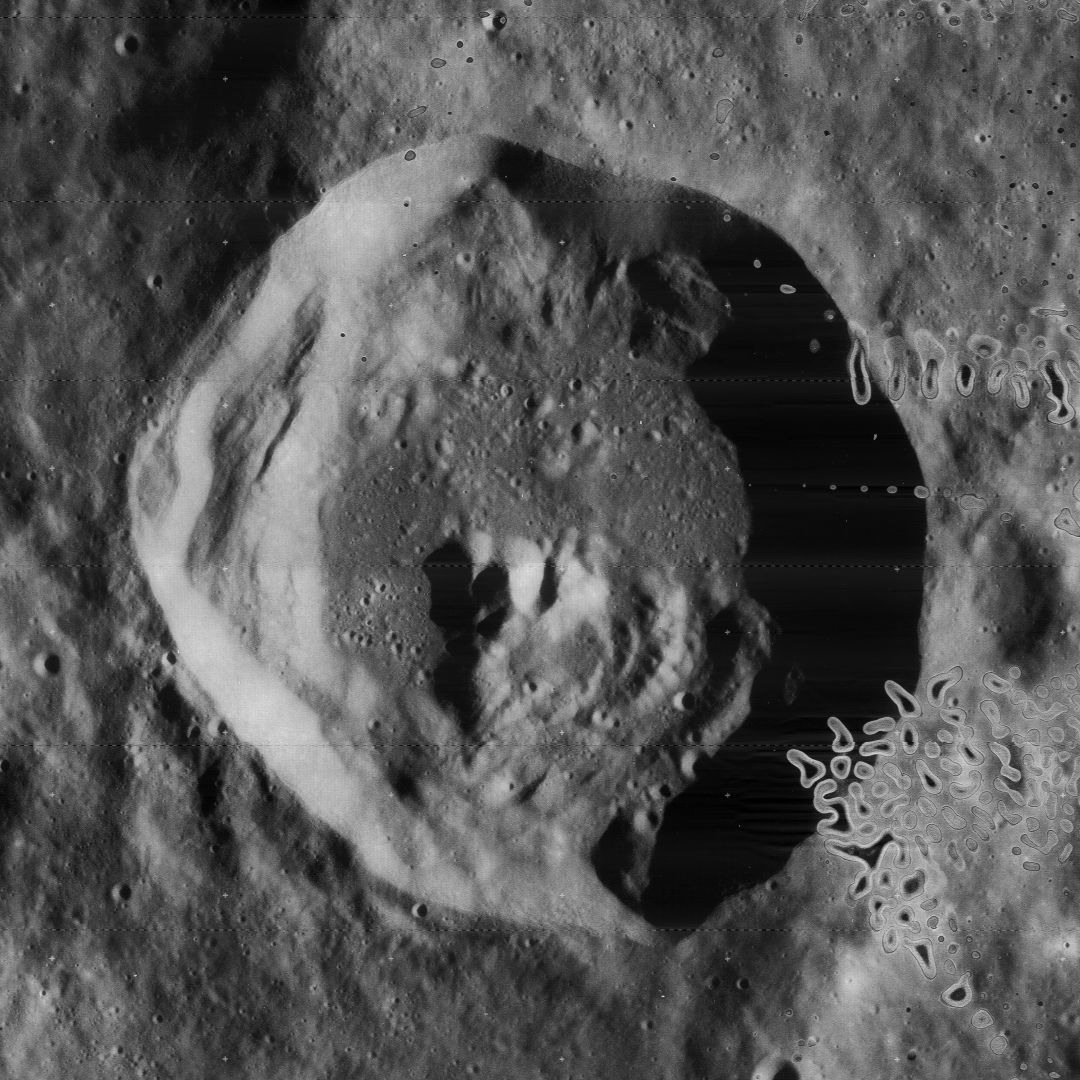
Balboa A crater

By convention these features are identified on lunar maps by placing the letter on the side of the crater midpoint that is closest to Balboa.

Balboa	Latitude	Longitude	Diameter
A	17.4° N	81.9° W	47 km
B	20.3° N	82.3° W	62 km
C	19.6° N	79.1° W	27 km
D	18.2° N	79.7° W	40 km
