= Dalton (crater) =

Lunar surface depression

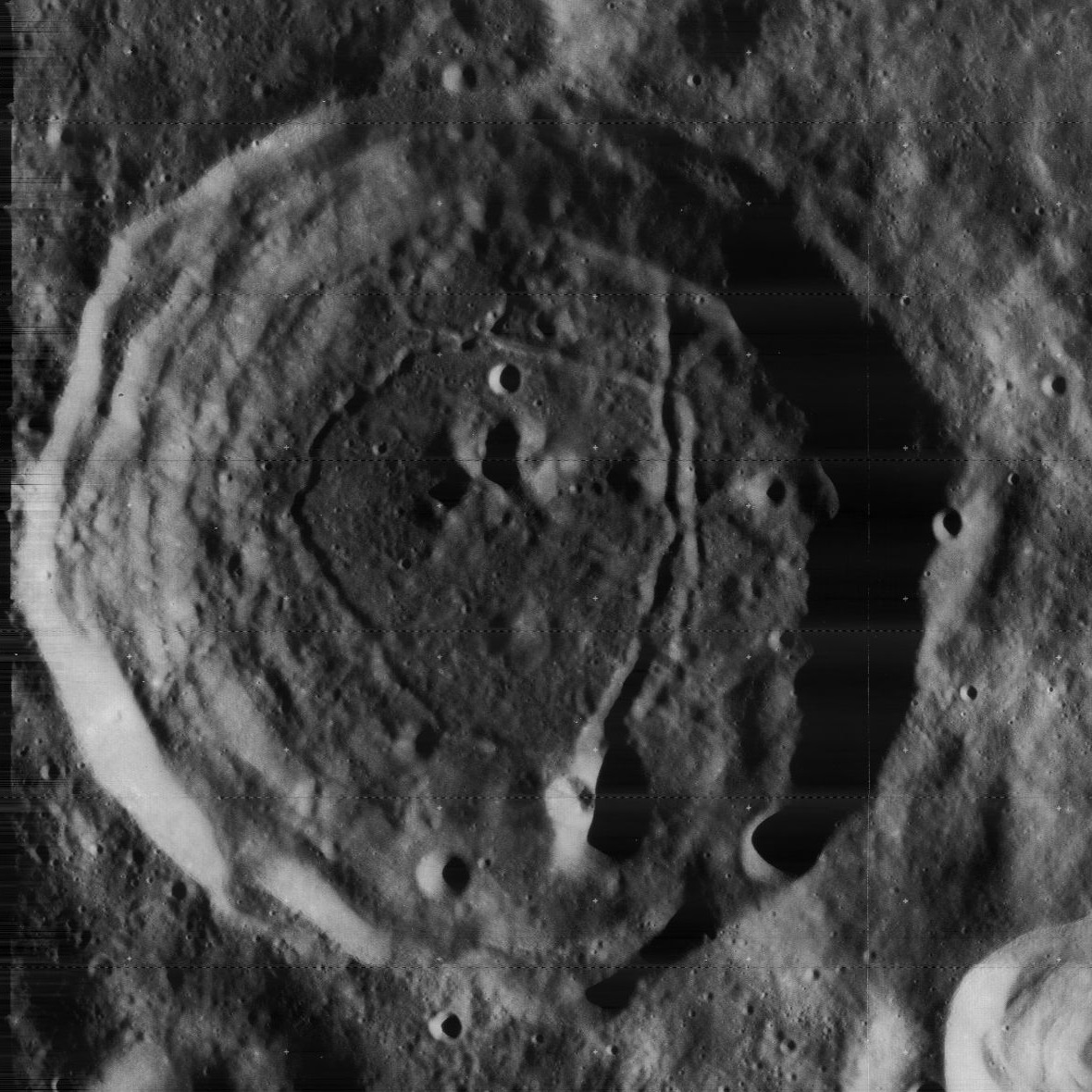
- Lunar Orbiter 4 image
- Coordinates: 17.1°N 84.3°W
- Diameter: 60.69 km (37.71 mi)
- Depth: Unknown
- Colongitude: 85° at sunrise
- Eponym: John Dalton

Dalton is a lunar impact crater that is located near the western limb of the Moon's near side. At that location it appears significantly foreshortened when seen from the Earth, being observed almost from the side. It is best viewed just prior to a full Moon during a favorable libration. Dalton is attached to the eastern rim of the walled plain named Einstein, with Balboa lying just to the north and Vasco da Gama due south.

The rim of this crater is not heavily eroded, and the interior walls are terraced. The interior floor has a system of fractures that are generally concentric with the inner wall. There is a small crater near the southern inner wall, and another at the north face of the small central peak. The infrared spectrum of pure crystalline plagioclase has been identified on the central peak and southern rim.

This crater is named after English chemist and physicist John Dalton (1766–1844). His name was introduced into lunar nomenclature by David W. G. Arthur and Ewen Whitaker with the Rectified Lunar Atlas (1963). Its designation was officially adopted by the International Astronomical Union in 1964.
