= Vasco da Gama (crater) =

Lunar surface depression

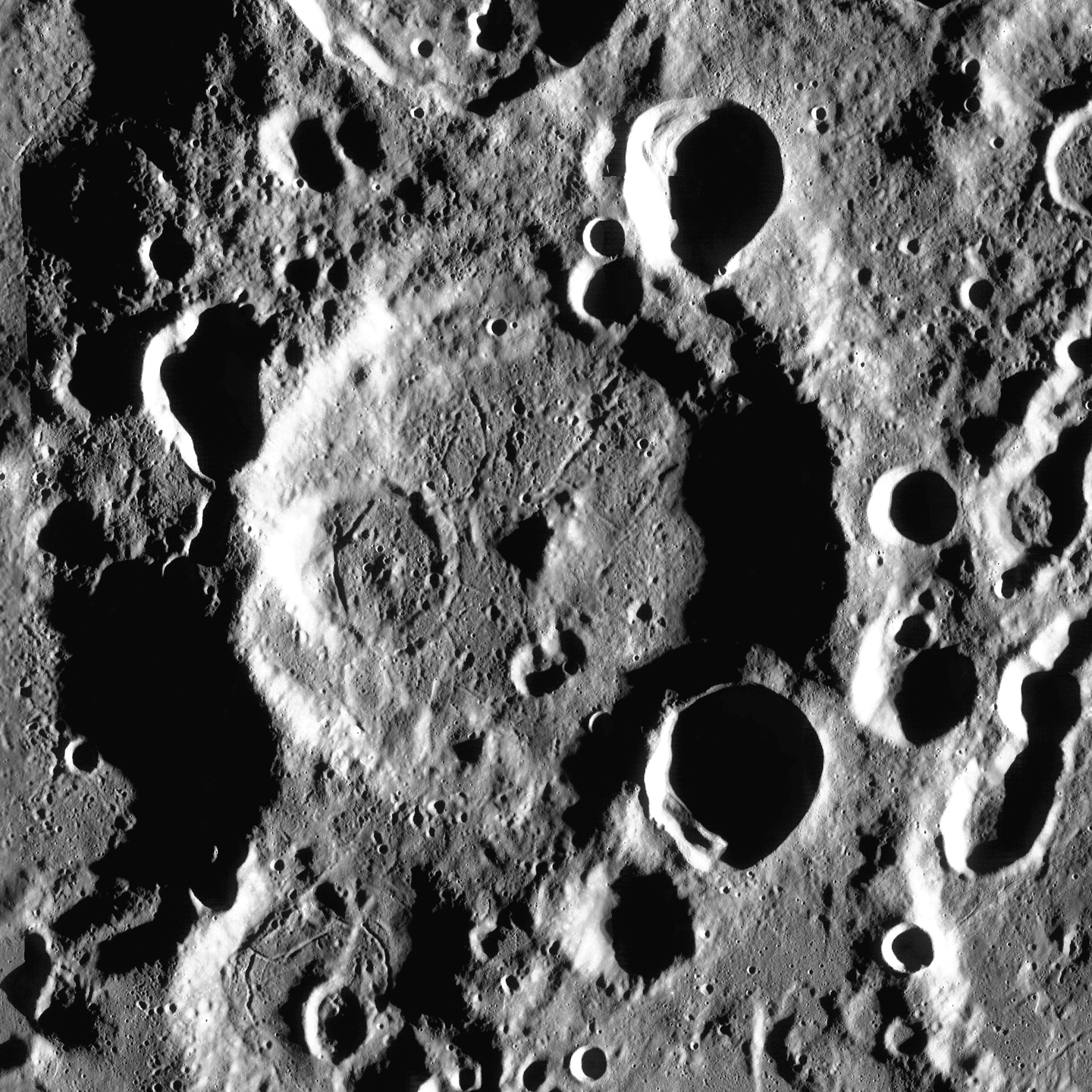
- Lunar Reconnaissance Orbiter image
- Coordinates: 13.78°N 83.94°W
- Diameter: 94 km
- Depth: 2.1 km
- Colongitude: 85° at sunrise
- Eponym: Vasco da Gama

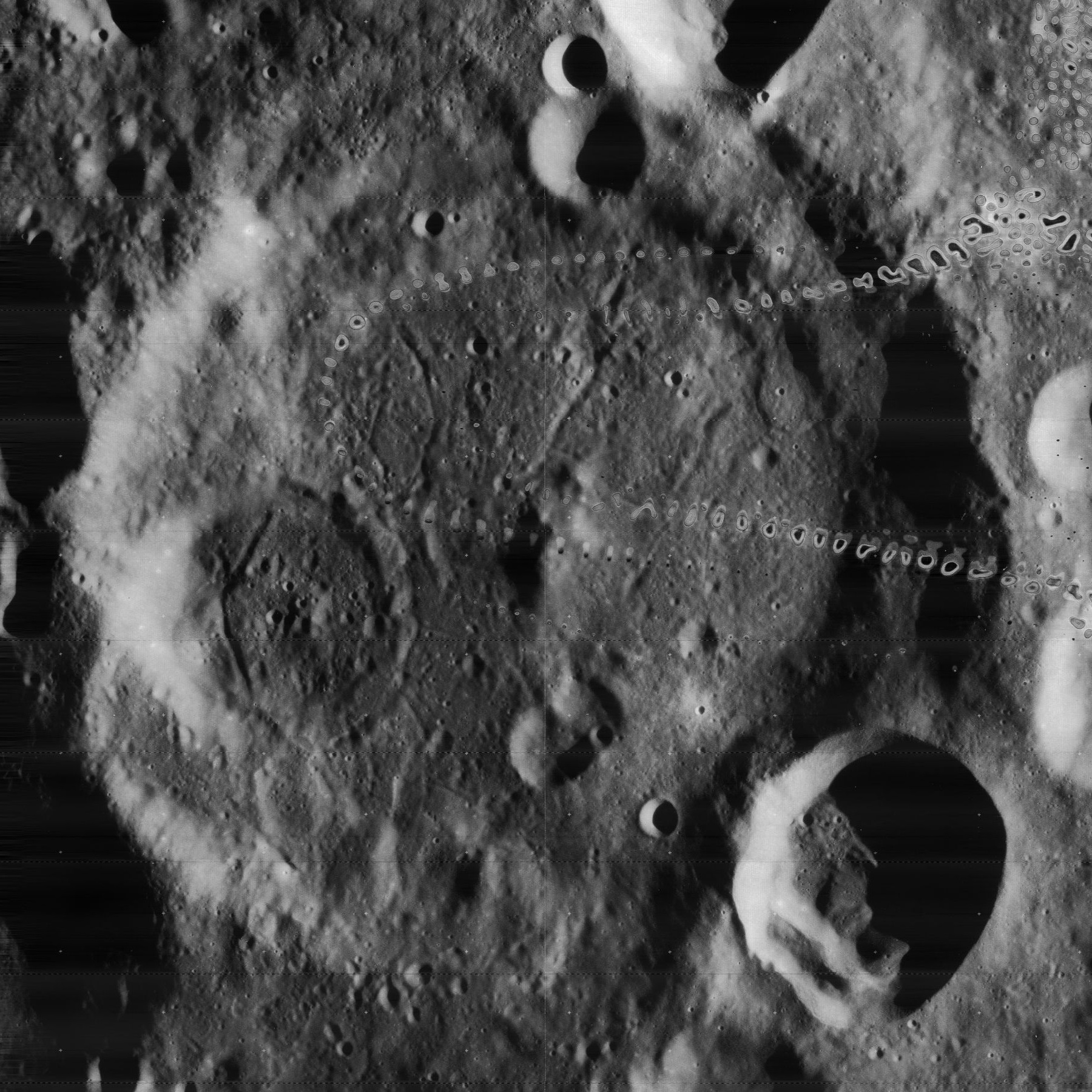
Lunar Orbiter 4 image (splotches are blemishes on original)

Vasco da Gama is a lunar impact crater that is located near the western limb of the Moon. It is named for the Portuguese explorer Vasco da Gama. It lies to the south of a walled plain named Einstein, due south of Dalton. Attached to the southwestern rim of Vasco da Gama is the somewhat smaller crater Bohr.

The northern and southern parts of the rim of Vasco da Gama have been heavily eroded by impacts, with the western and eastern rims being more intact. The smaller crater Vasco da Gama S intrudes into the southeastern rim, and just to its southwest is Vasco da Gama T. Near the northeastern rim is Vasco da Gama B. There is a low central massif near the midpoint of the interior.

The interior floor of satellite crater Vasco da Gama R contains a system of rilles designated the Rimae Vasco da Gama.

== Satellite craters ==
By convention these features are identified on lunar maps by placing the letter on the side of the crater midpoint that is closest to Vasco da Gama.

Vasco da Gama	Coordinates	Diameter, km
A	12.63°N 80.07°W	22
B	15.72°N 83.12°W	25
C	11.48°N 85.07°W	47
F	13.86°N 80.78°W	56
P	12.00°N 80.34°W	103
R	9.91°N 83.51°W	61
S	12.63°N 82.94°W	30
T	11.87°N 83.50°W	20
