= Bohnenberger (crater) =

Crater on the Moon

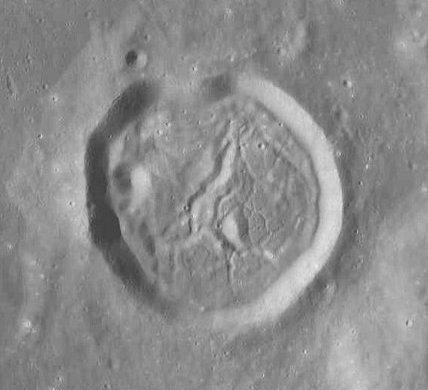
- LRO image
- Coordinates: 16.24°S 40.06°E
- Diameter: 31.74 km (19.72 mi)
- Depth: 2.4 km (1.5 mi)
- Colongitude: 320° at sunrise
- Eponym: Johann von Bohnenberger

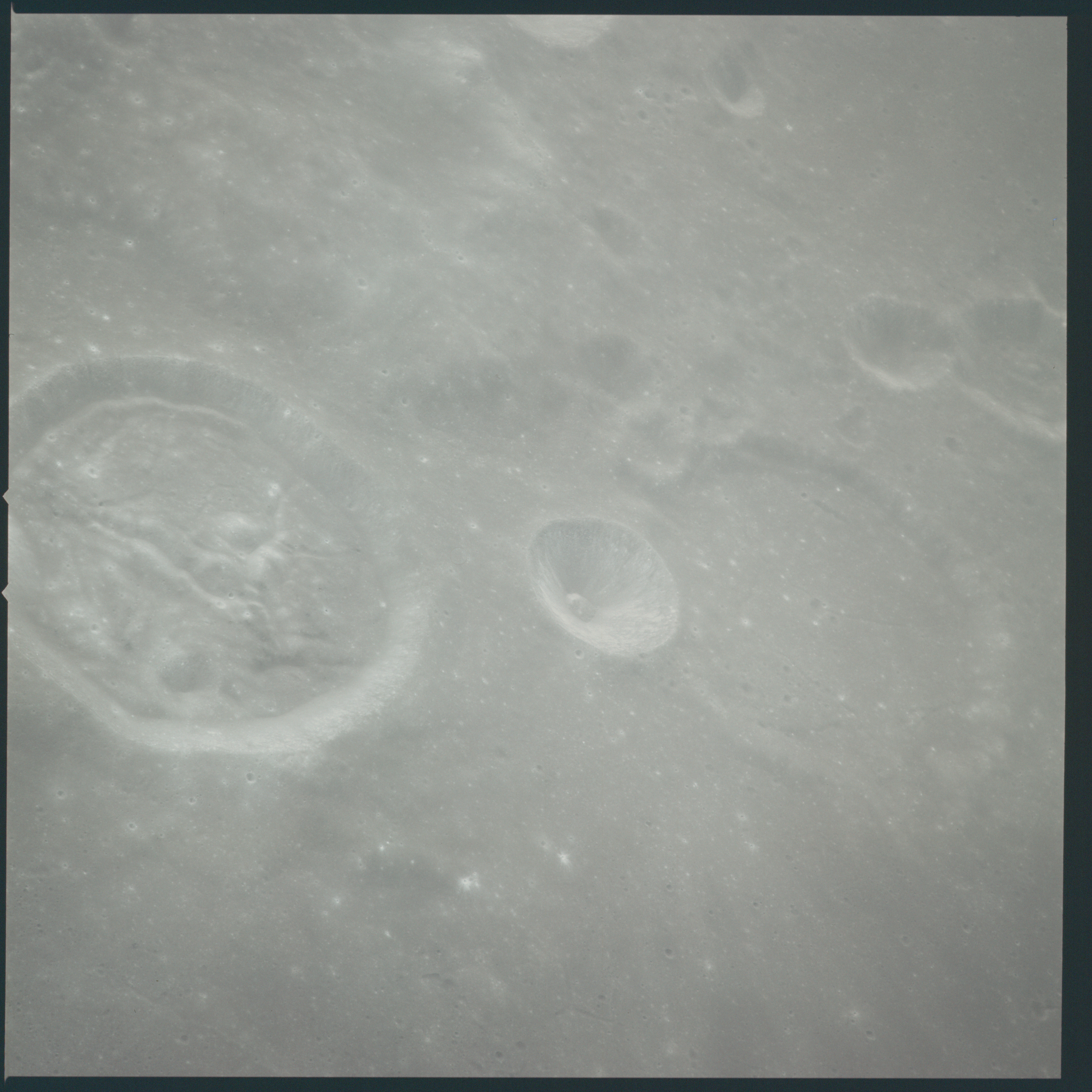
Oblique view from Apollo 12, facing east. Bohnenberger G (near center) and A (right) are also visible.

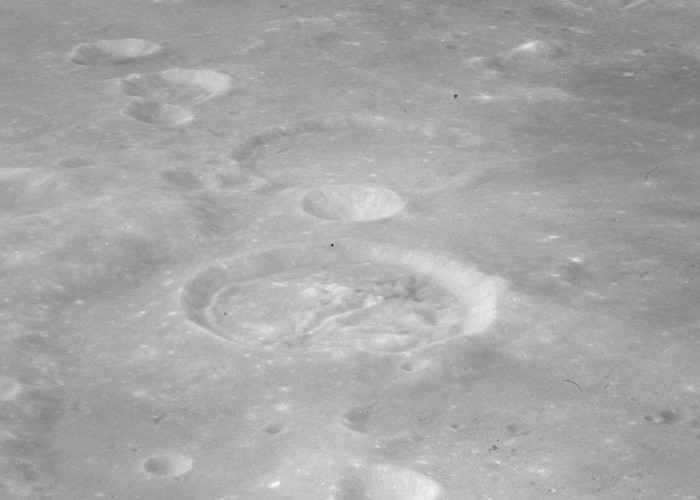
Oblique view from Apollo 16, facing south, with Bohnenberger below center, A and G above center, and W, C, and P in upper left.

Bohnenberger is a lunar impact crater that lies near the east edge of the Mare Nectaris, in the foothills of the Montes Pyrenaeus mountain range that forms the perimeter of the mare. To the east beyond the mountains is the larger crater Colombo.

The crater has a low rim along the north wall, and the floor is somewhat irregular with a set of fractures crossing the floor. A shallow, v-shaped moat separates the wall from the floor. Satellite crater Bohnenberger A is also somewhat fractured. The infrared spectrum of pure crystalline plagioclase has been identified on the northeast floor and rim, southeast wall, and ejecta to the southwest.

This crater is named after German astronomer Johann von Bohnenberger. Its name was incorporated into lunar nomenclature by German astronomer J. H. von Mädler during the 19th century. The crater designation was formally adopted by the International Astronomical Union in 1935.

== Satellite craters ==
By convention these features are identified on lunar maps by placing the letter on the side of the crater midpoint that is closest to Bohnenberger.

| Bohnenberger | Latitude | Longitude | Diameter |
|---|---|---|---|
| A | 17.8° S | 40.1° E | 30 km |
| C | 18.5° S | 41.1° E | 16 km |
| D | 18.3° S | 42.6° E | 14 km |
| E | 17.4° S | 42.1° E | 13 km |
| F | 14.7° S | 39.6° E | 10 km |
| G | 17.2° S | 40.1° E | 12 km |
| J | 14.8° S | 40.3° E | 5 km |
| N | 17.9° S | 41.9° E | 6 km |
| P | 19.1° S | 41.4° E | 11 km |
| W | 18.2° S | 41.1° E | 10 km |
