= Simmozheim =

German municipality

- Municipality
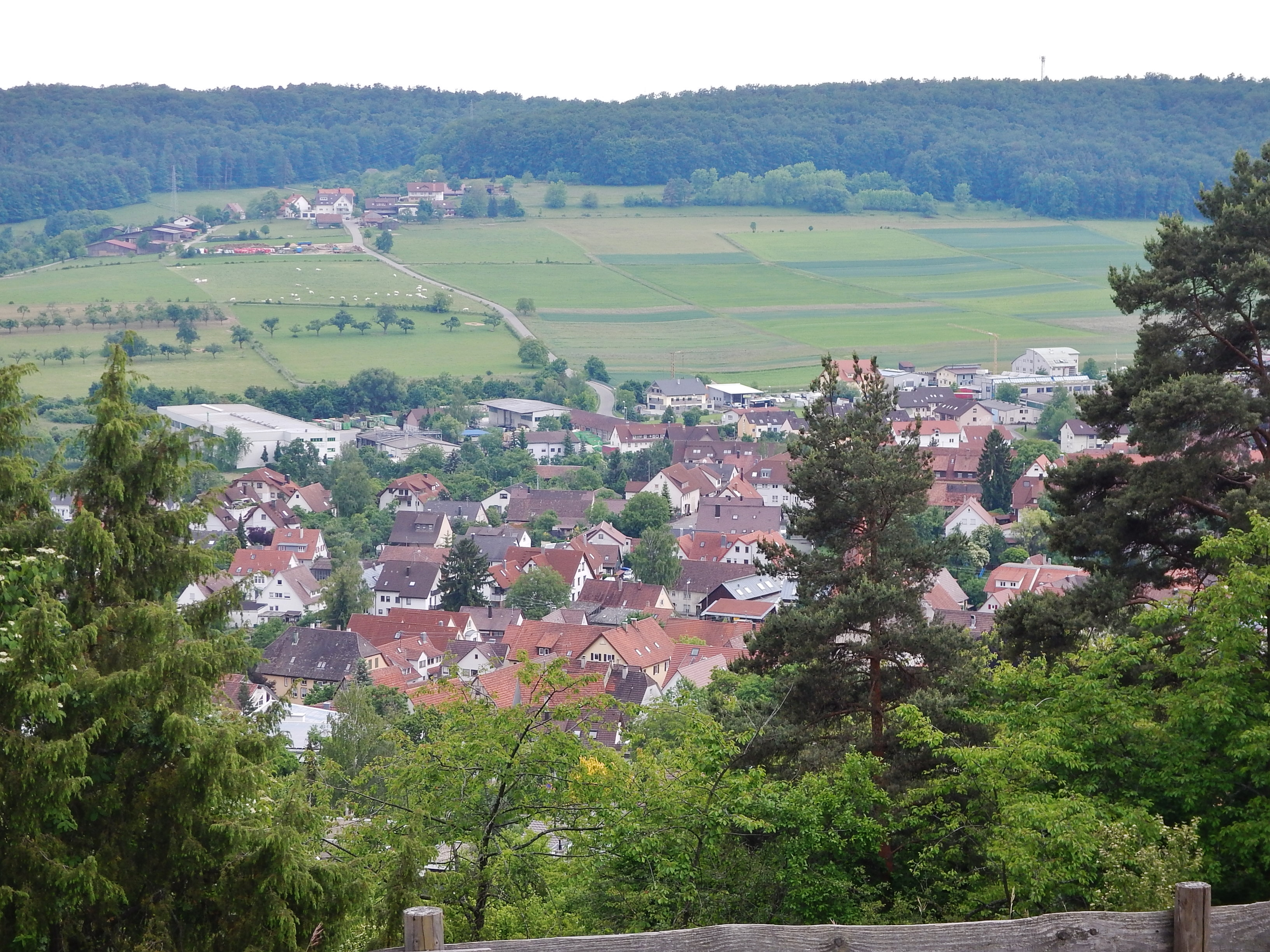
- Simmozheim from the north

- Coat of arms

- Location of Simmozheim within Calw district
- Interactive map of Simmozheim
- Location within Germany Location within Baden-Württemberg
- Coordinates: 48°45′06″N 08°48′42″E
- Country: Germany
- State: Baden-Württemberg
- Admin. region: Karlsruhe
- District: Calw

Government
  - Mayor (2016–24): Stefan Feigl

Area
  - Total: 9.50 km^{2} (3.67 sq mi)
- Elevation: 483 m (1,585 ft)

Population (2025-12-31)
  - Total: 2,823
  - Density: 297/km^{2} (770/sq mi)
- Time zone: UTC+01:00 (CET)
  - Summer (DST): UTC+02:00 (CEST)
- Postal codes: 75397
- Dialling codes: 07033
- Vehicle registration: CW
- Website: www.simmozheim.de

Simmozheim is a town in the district of Calw in Baden-Württemberg in Germany.

== History ==
From 1341 to 1442, Herrenalb Abbey slowly acquired title over Simmozheim. The Kingdom of Württemberg annexed the abbey in 1808 and Simmozheim was subsequently assigned to Oberamt Calw. That district was reorganized in 1938 as Landkreis Calw and Simmozheim remained in its jurisdiction. Simmozheim has grown substantially since World War II, primarily to its south, west, and east.

== Geography ==
The municipality (Gemeinde) of Simmozheim is found at the northeast edge of the district of Calw, along its border with the district of Böblingen. Simmozheim is physically located in the Schlehengäu region of the Heckengäu and the Upper Gäu. Elevation above sea level in the municipal area ranges from a high of 587 meters (1,926 ft) Normalnull (NN) to a low of 437 meters (1,434 ft) NN.

Portions of the Federally protected Hörnle and Geißberg and Simmozheim forest nature reserves are located in Simmozheim's municipal area.

== Politics ==
Simmozheim has one borough (Ortsteil), Simmozheim, and one village, Büchelbronn. Simmozheim is in a municipal association with the municipalities of Althengstett, Gechingen, and Ostelsheim.

=== Coat of arms ===
The coat of arms of Simmolzheim shows a lion, in yellow, standing and facing to the left with a crosier, in white, in its forepaws, below a white, six-pointed star, upon a field of red. The lion is a reference to the House of Vaihingen, who ruled the town before Württemberg, but it only appeared in municipal seals in the 19th century. The six-pointed star is taken from the Lords of Kröwelsau, minor feudal lords who governed Simmolzheim for the Counts of Vaihingen and later of Württemberg. The crosier is a reference to Herrenalb Abbey and first appeared in local seals in 1628. This coat of arms was in used as early as 1927 but was not adopted for official use until 1956. A corresponding municipal flag was issued to Simmozheim by the Calw district office on 29 September 1983.

== Transportation ==
Simmozheim is connected to Germany's network of roadways by Bundesstraße 295. Local public transportation is provided by the Verkehrsgesellschaft Bäderkreis Calw.
