= Lavoisier (crater) =

Crater on the Moon

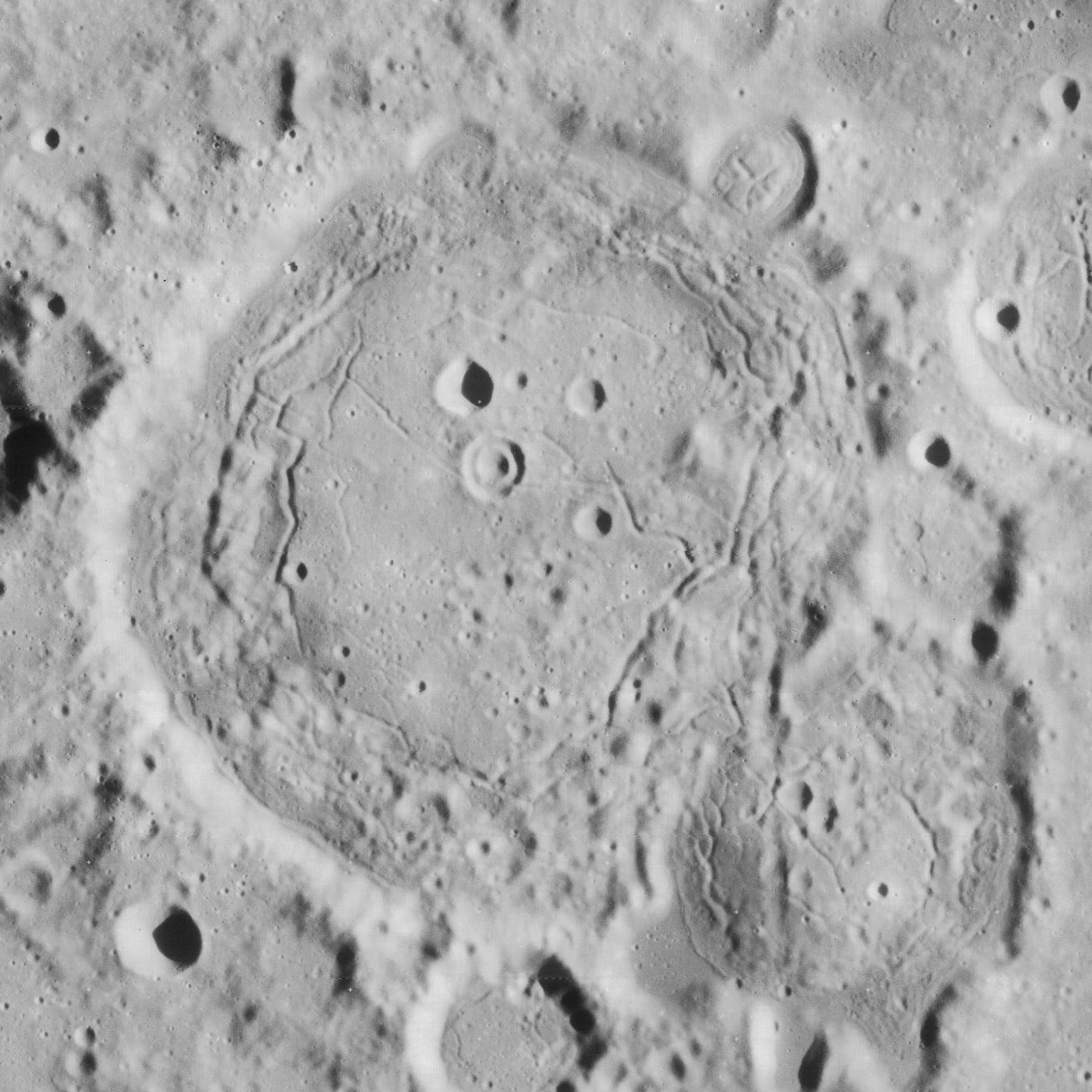
- Lavoisier at center, Lavoisier F in lower right. Lunar Orbiter 4 image.
- Coordinates: 38.2°N 81.2°W
- Diameter: 70 km
- Depth: 2.0 km
- Colongitude: 82° at sunrise
- Eponym: Antoine L. Lavoisier

Lavoisier is a lunar impact crater that is located near the northwestern limb of the Moon, at the western edge of the Oceanus Procellarum. It is named after the French chemist Antoine Lavoisier. It is located to the southwest of the crater von Braun and southeast of Bunsen. Due south of Lavoisier is the disintegrated crater Ulugh Beigh.

This is a worn crater formation with several small craters attached to the exterior of the rim. Lavoisier F is a distorted crater that shares a common rim along the southeastern side of Lavoisier. The southern rim is extended outward, and is overlaid by the small crater Lavoisier W. Lavoisier S is a worn crater that is attached to the northwestern rim. There are also a pair of small craters along the outer eastern rim. A small crater has incised a short section along the northern rim.

The interior of this floor-fractured crater is notable for the curving ridge that parallels the northwestern inner wall. The remainder of this circular form can be traced out across the interior by an intermittent pattern of lower-albedo surface that is concentric with the inner wall. There are also several rilles marking the interior surface, particularly along the outer edges. In the northern center of the floor is a triplet of small craterlets. Several other tiny craters mark the interior surface.

== Satellite craters ==
By convention these features are identified on lunar maps by placing the letter on the side of the crater midpoint that is closest to Lavoisier.

Lavoisier	Latitude	Longitude	Diameter
A	36.9° N	73.2° W	28 km
B	39.8° N	79.7° W	25 km
C	35.8° N	76.7° W	35 km
E	40.9° N	80.4° W	49 km
F	37.1° N	80.5° W	33 km
G	37.3° N	85.7° W	19 km
H	38.3° N	78.8° W	29 km
J	37.5° N	86.5° W	22 km
K	39.7° N	74.4° W	7 km
L	39.7° N	75.0° W	6 km
N	41.9° N	82.4° W	24 km
S	39.1° N	83.1° W	24 km
T	36.5° N	76.6° W	19 km
W	36.9° N	81.8° W	16 km
Z	36.1° N	86.2° W	12 km

The following crater has been renamed by the IAU.

- Lavoisier D — See von Braun (crater).
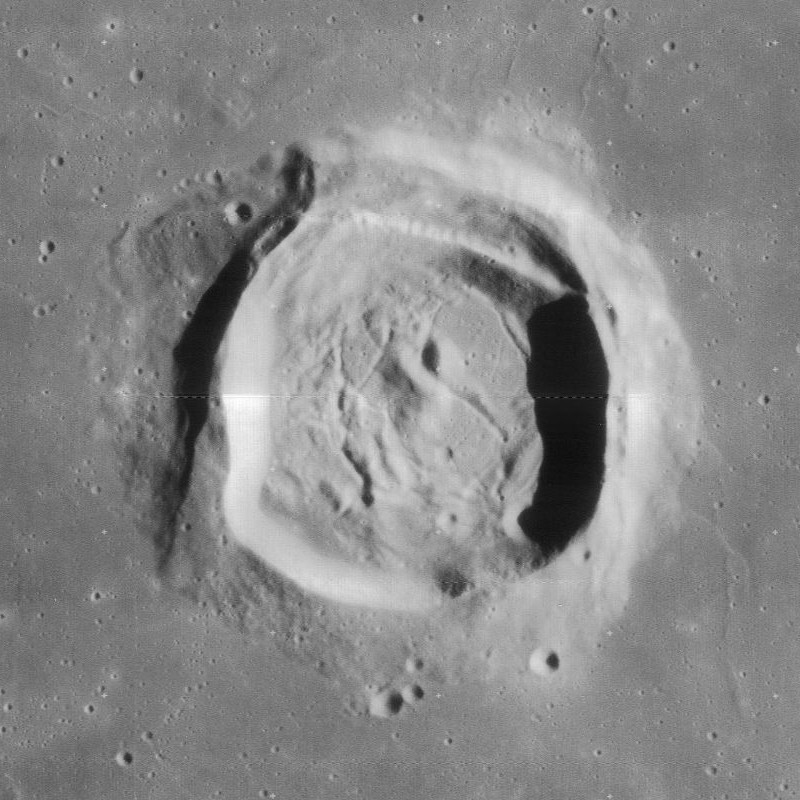
Lavoisier A, east of Lavoisier

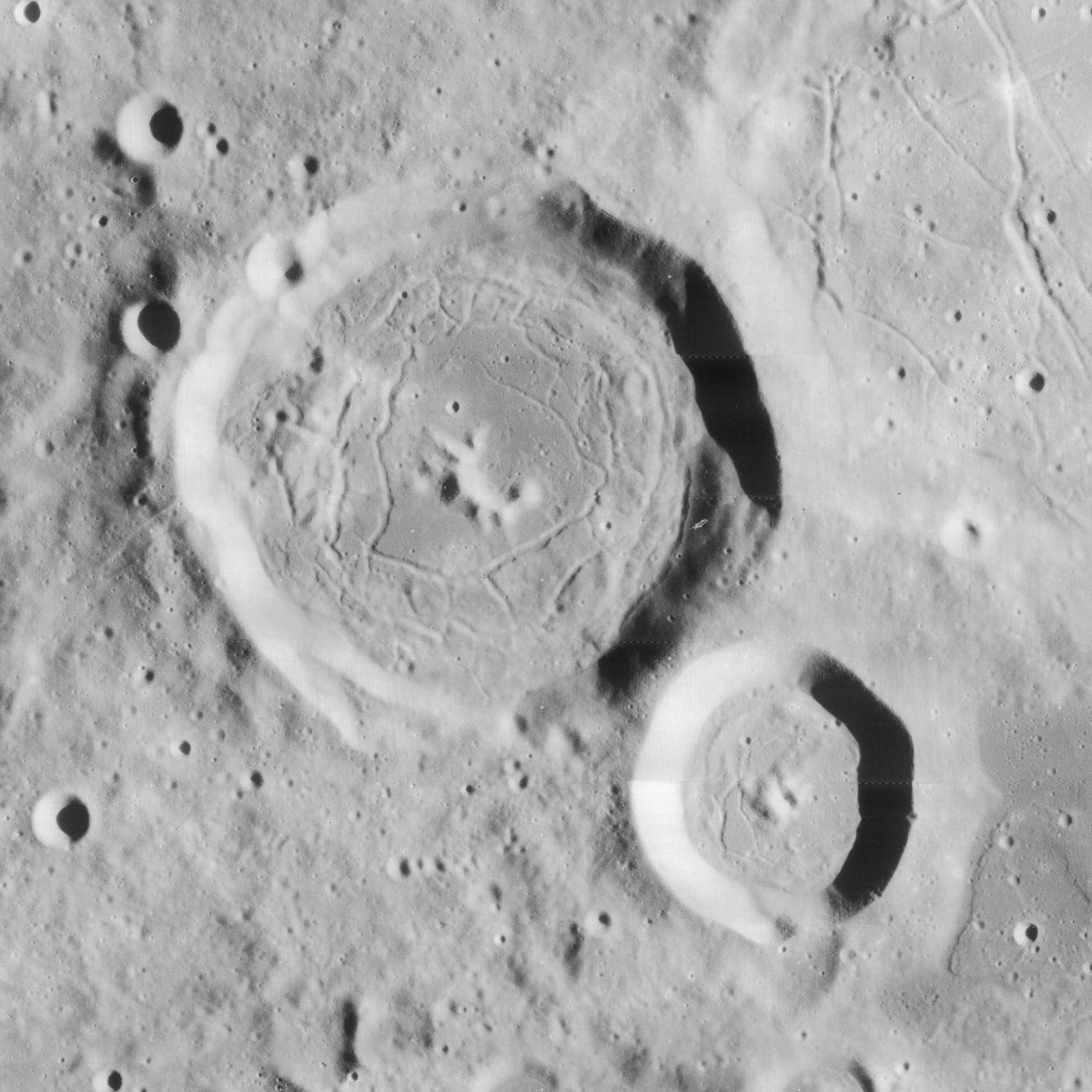
Lavoisier B (smaller) and E (larger) craters, north of Lavoisier

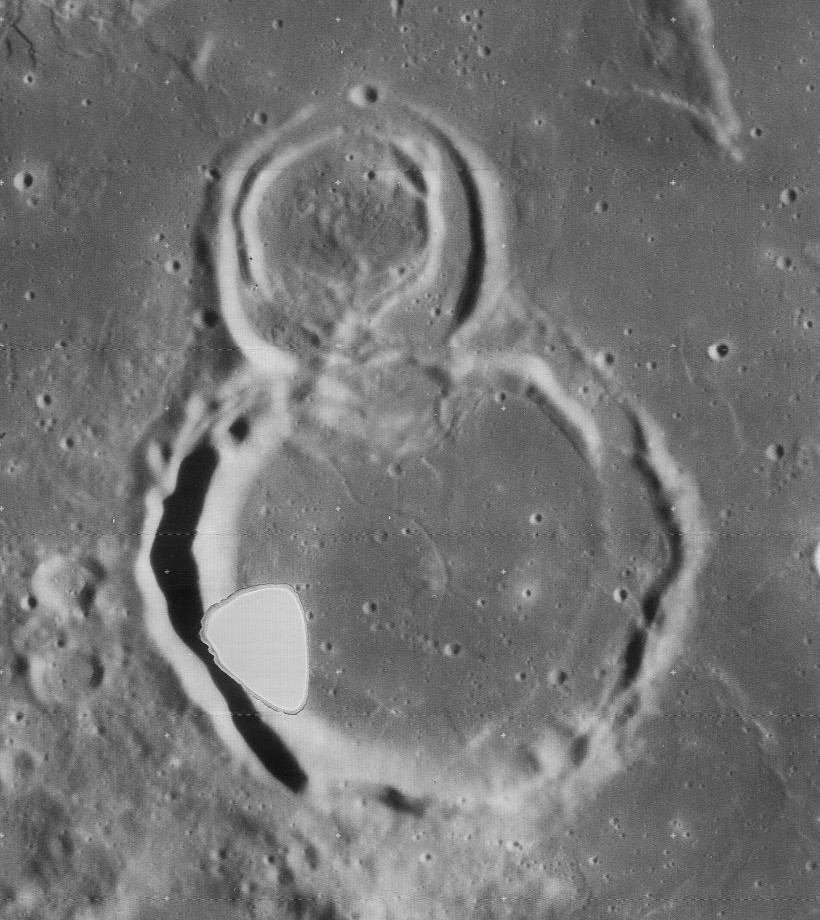
Lavoisier C (larger) and T (smaller) east of Lavoisier

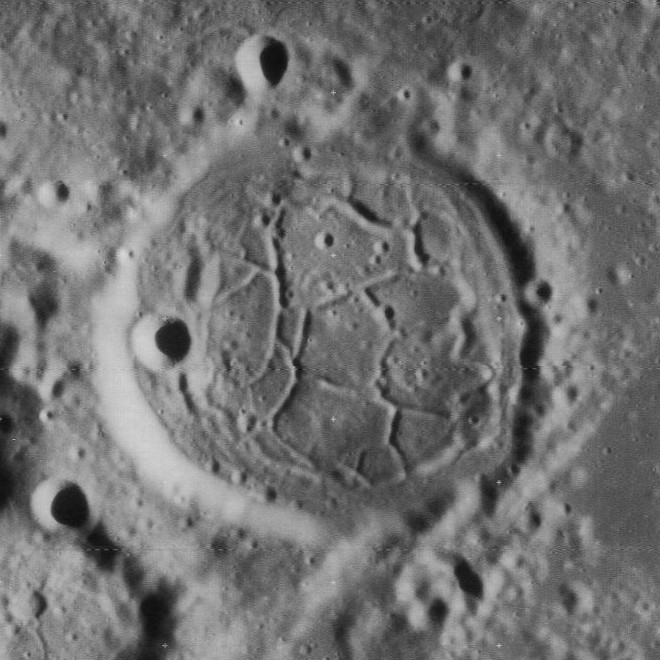
Lavoisier H, east of Lavoisier
