= Von Braun (crater) =

Crater on the Moon

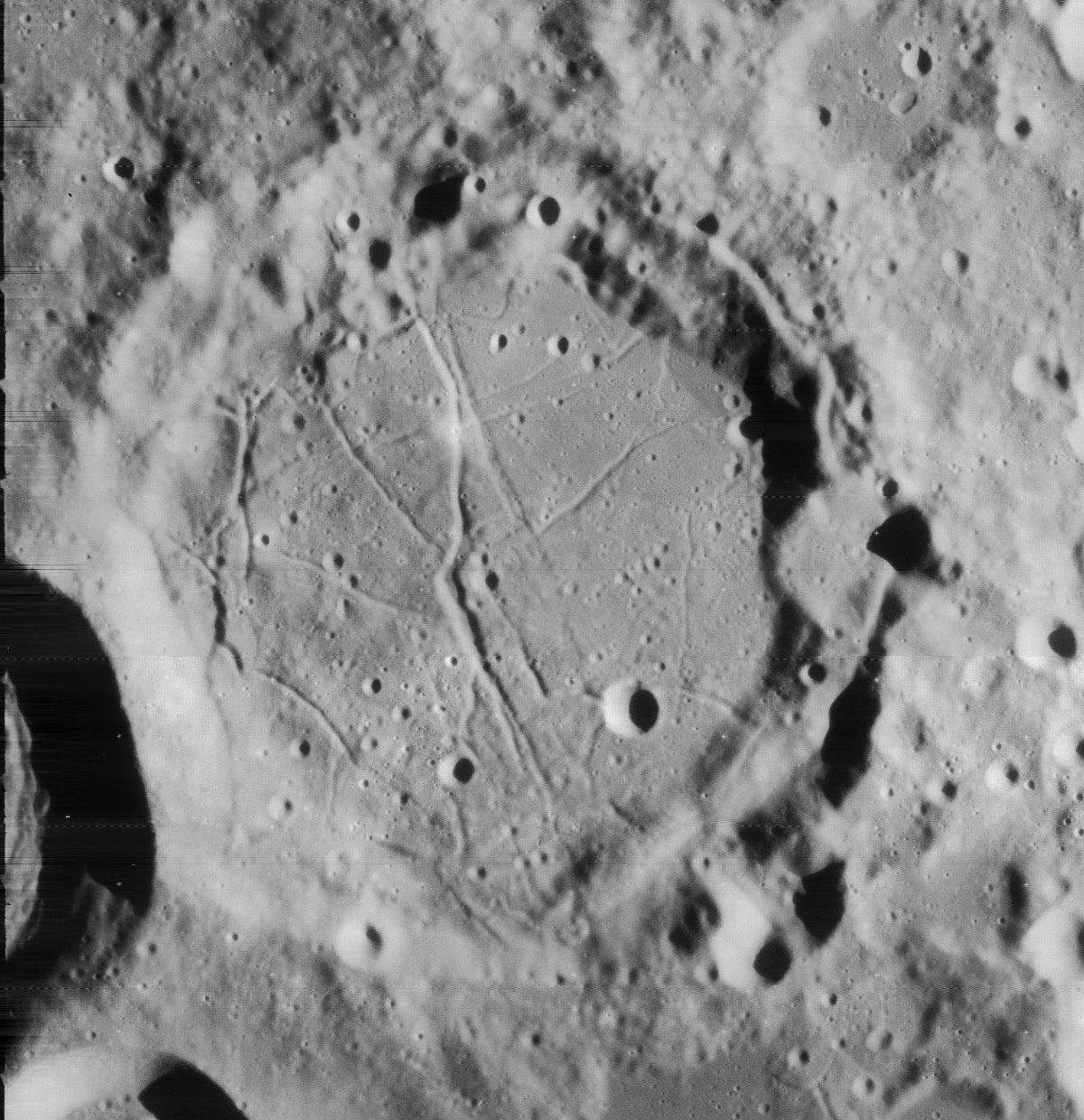
- Lunar Orbiter 4 image
- Coordinates: 41.04°N 78.08°W
- Diameter: 61.83 km (38.42 mi)
- Depth: Unknown
- Colongitude: 79° at sunrise
- Eponym: Wernher von Braun

von Braun, named after the rocket pioneer Wernher von Braun, is a lunar impact crater located near the northwestern limb of the Moon. It lies along the western edge of the Oceanus Procellarum, to the northeast of the crater Lavoisier. The northeastern rim of this crater is on the edge of the Sinus Roris, a bay feature in the northwestern part of the Oceanus Procellarum. Due to its proximity to the limb, this crater appears significantly foreshortened when viewed from the Earth.

This crater is somewhat distorted from a true circular shape, and is slightly longer to the north and south. The outer rim has undergone some erosion due to subsequent impacts. The crater Lavoisier E is attached to the western rim, and the outer rampart falls across part of the inner wall of von Braun. The inner wall has slumped along the southeast and northwestern sides to form a terrace-like shelf. The interior floor is relatively level, but contains several linear fractures.

This crater was previously identified as Lavoisier D before being assigned its curren name by the IAU in 1994.
