= Illingen, Baden-Württemberg =

German municipality

Illingen
- Municipality
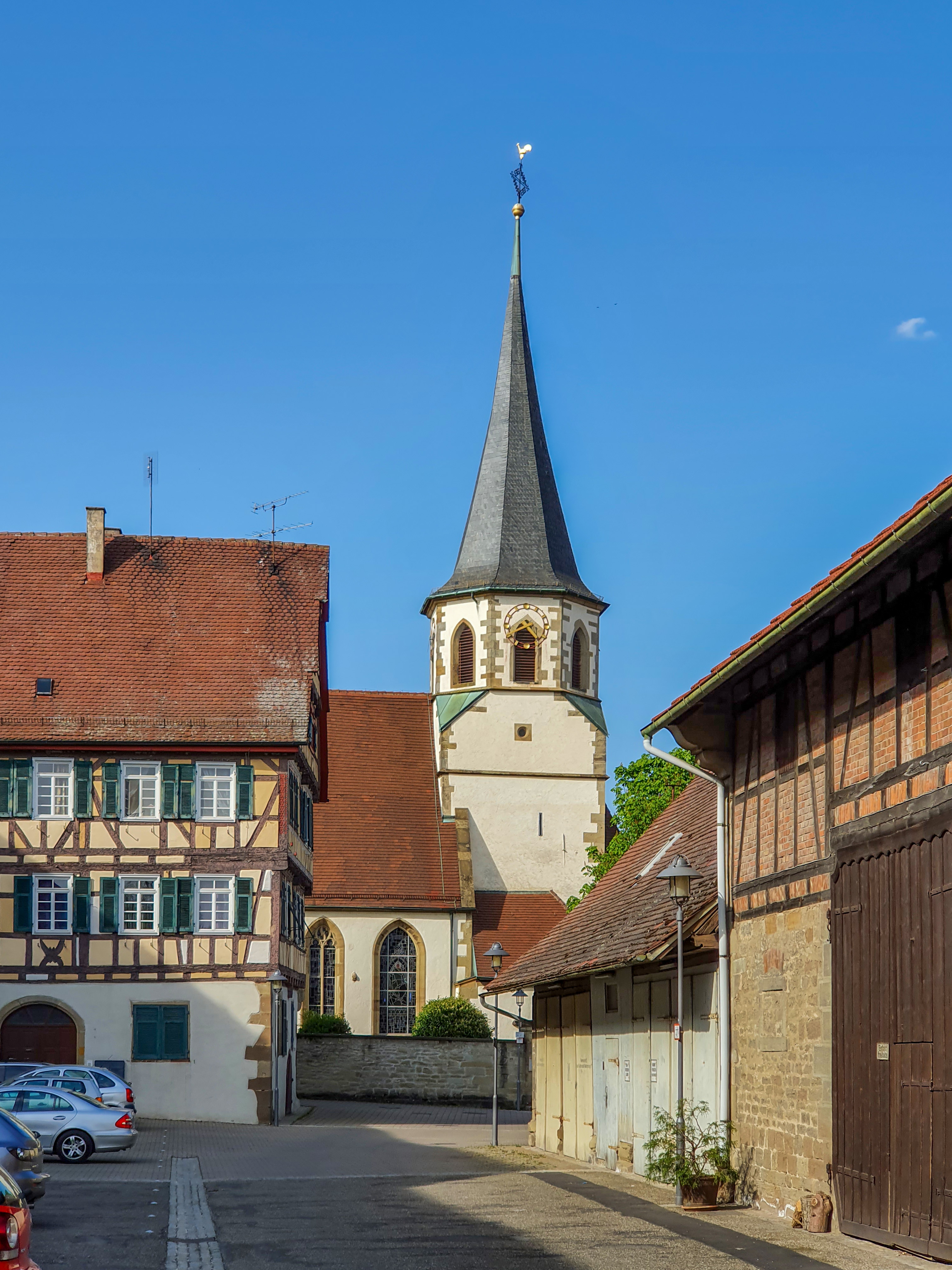
- St. Cyriacus's Church

- Coat of arms

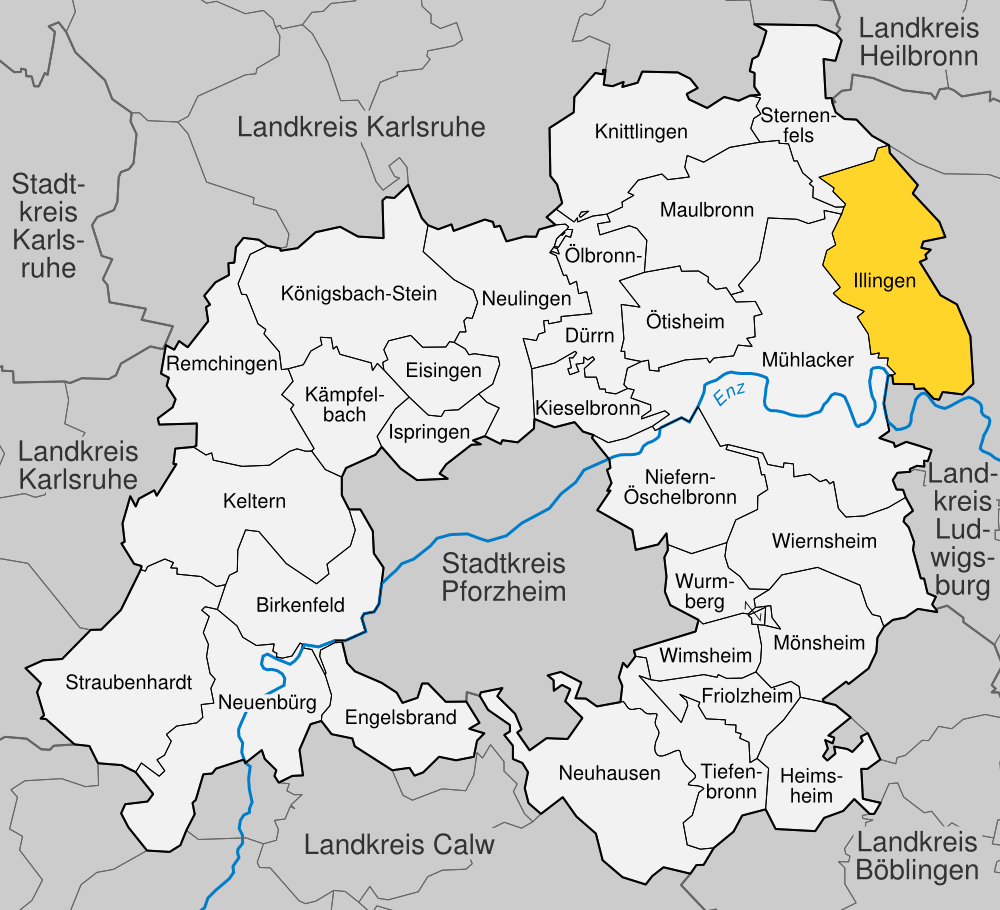
- Location of Illingen within Enzkreis district
- Interactive map of Illingen
- Location within Germany Location within Baden-Württemberg
- Coordinates: 48°57′19″N 8°55′8″E
- Country: Germany
- State: Baden-Württemberg
- Admin. region: Karlsruhe
- District: Enzkreis
- Subdivisions: 2

Government
  - Mayor (2021–29): Armin Pioch (Greens)

Area
  - Total: 29.37 km^{2} (11.34 sq mi)
- Elevation: 235 m (771 ft)

Population (2025-12-31)
  - Total: 7,639
  - Density: 260.1/km^{2} (673.6/sq mi)
- Time zone: UTC+01:00 (CET)
  - Summer (DST): UTC+02:00 (CEST)
- Postal codes: 75424 75428
- Dialling codes: 07042 (Illingen); 07043 (Schützingen)
- Vehicle registration: PF
- Website: www.illingen-online.de

Illingen (German pronunciation: [ˈɪlɪŋən]) is a municipality in Baden-Württemberg, Germany. With a population of about 8,000, it is 27 kilometers (89,000 ft) to the west of Stuttgart, the capital of Baden-Württemberg.

== History ==
The towns of Illingen and Schützingen were, in the Middle Ages, owned by the nearby Maulbronn Monastery. In 1504, the monastery was taken over by the Duchy of Württemberg, beginning a centuries-long association with Württemberg. On 18 March 1806, the now Kingdom of Württemberg assigned Illingen and Schützingen to Oberamt Mualbronn. This became the district of Maulbronn in 1934, to which the two towns were also assigned. When that district was dissolved in 1938, they were assigned to Vaihingen's district. With the 1973 district reform in the State of Baden-Württemberg, they were assigned to the district of Enz. In 1974, Illingen and Schützingen were joined into a single municipality.

== Geography ==
The municipality (Gemeinde) of Illingen is located at the eastern edge of the Enzkreis district, within the state of Baden-Württemberg and Federal Republic of Germany. It covers an area of 29.36 square kilometers (11.34 mi^{2}) that lies within the metropolitan areas of Karlsruhe and Pforzheim. Illingen is physically located on the Keuper Uplands, just north of the Enz valley, between the Neckar basin and the hilly Stromberg region. The largest watercourses within the municipality are the Schmiebach and Metter rivers. The lowest elevation in the municipality, 208 meters (682 ft) NN, lies along the Schmie while the highest, 395 meters (1,296 ft) NN, is the top of the Burgberg in the west.

The geological makeup of Illingen varies by area. The south is composed of Keuper from the Stromberg's Keuperberg subregion. In and around the town of Illingen, this Keuper is covered by layers of loess and loam.

North of Schützingen is the Federally protected Schützinger Spiegel nature reserve. In the municipality's southern reaches are the Enzaue bei Roßwag und Burg and Füllmenbacher Hofberg reserves.

== Coat of arms ==
The municipality of Illingen's coat of arms displays the historical coats of arms for the towns of Illingen and Schützingen. On the left is Schützingen's, displaying a red key upon a yellow field, and on the right is Illingen's, a red spear with a golden flag upon a blue field. The flag upon Illingen's dates to 1937 while Schützingen's key was associated with the township by the time of its documentation in the 1684 cartographic book Kiesersche Forstkarte. That municipal coat of arms and flag were approved by the Karlsruhe General State Archives on 1 March 1974.

== Notable people ==
- August Dillmann, orientalist and biblical scholar
- Jakob Friedrich Wanner, architect
- Marlies Krämer, feminist and politician
