= Gäu (Baden-Württemberg) =

Sparsely wooded cultural landscape type

The gäu (German pronunciation: [ɡɔʏ]) landscapes of Baden-Württemberg are sparsely wooded cultural landscapes that have evolved on the South German Scarplands between the Black Forest, the Stromberg and Heuchelberg in the west, and the Swabian Jura and Swabian Keuperwald Hills in the east. In the north, the Swabian gäu landscapes transition into the uplands of Bauland and Tauberland.

A gäu (plural gäue) is a plateau, about 250 to 500 metres above sea level. It is made of muschelkalk and lettenkeuper rock strata, which have been deeply incised in places by the rivers Neckar, Ammer, Würm, Glems, Enz, Metter, and Zaber.

The gäue are intensively farmed regions, whose soils mainly consist of brown earths (Parabraunerden) on loess. In the so-called Poor Gäue (Arme Gäue) there is no covering of loess. On the karstified limestones of the Upper Muschelkalk, generally only shallow and less fertile rendzinas have developed. Hedges have formed on the Lesesteinriegeln (Heckengäu).

Comparable landscapes in the immediate vicinity bordering on those of the gäue are the Schmidener Feld near Fellbach and the Backnang Bight east of the Middle Neckar.

== See also ==
- Gäu Plateaus - a natural region largely coterminous with the Gäu.
