= Leudelsbach =

River in Germany

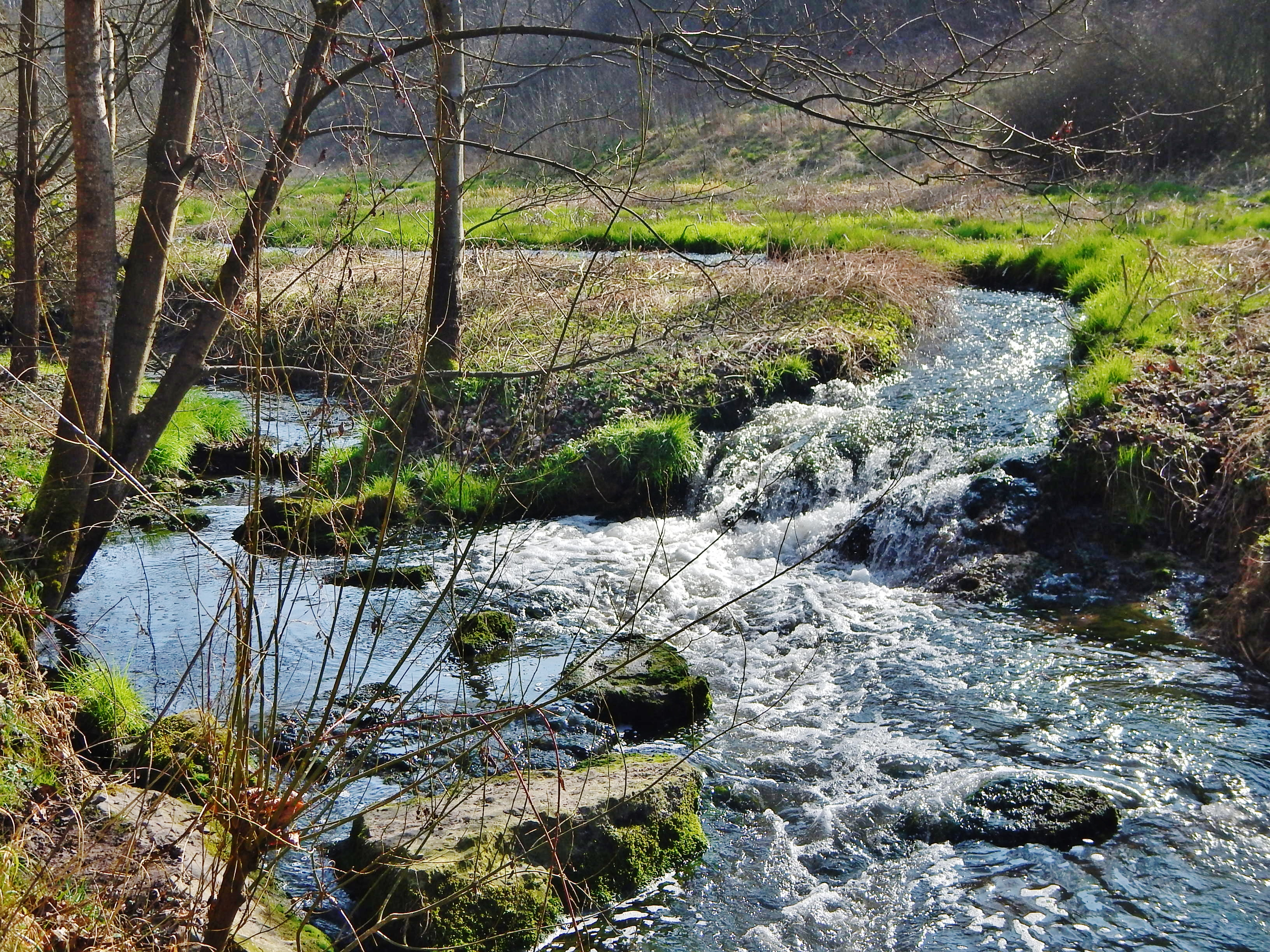

Location
- Country: Germany
- State: Baden-Württemberg
- District: Landkreis Ludwigsburg
- Municipalities: Möglingen and Markgröningen

Physical characteristics
- Source
  - location: Möglingen
  - coordinates: 48°53′24″N 09°07′42″E
  - elevation: 280 m (920 ft)
- Mouth: Enz
  - location: between Unterriexingen and Untermberg
  - coordinates: 48°55′35″N 09°04′40″E
  - elevation: 186 m (610 ft)
- Length: 6.574 km (4.085 mi)
- Basin size: 21.7 km^{2} (8.4 sq mi)

Basin features
- Progression: Enz→ Neckar→ Rhine→ North Sea

The Leudelsbach is a small river of Baden-Württemberg, Germany. The 6.5 kilometer long river flows into the Enz near Unterriexingen.

== See also ==
- List of rivers of Baden-Württemberg
