= Dürreych =

River in Germany

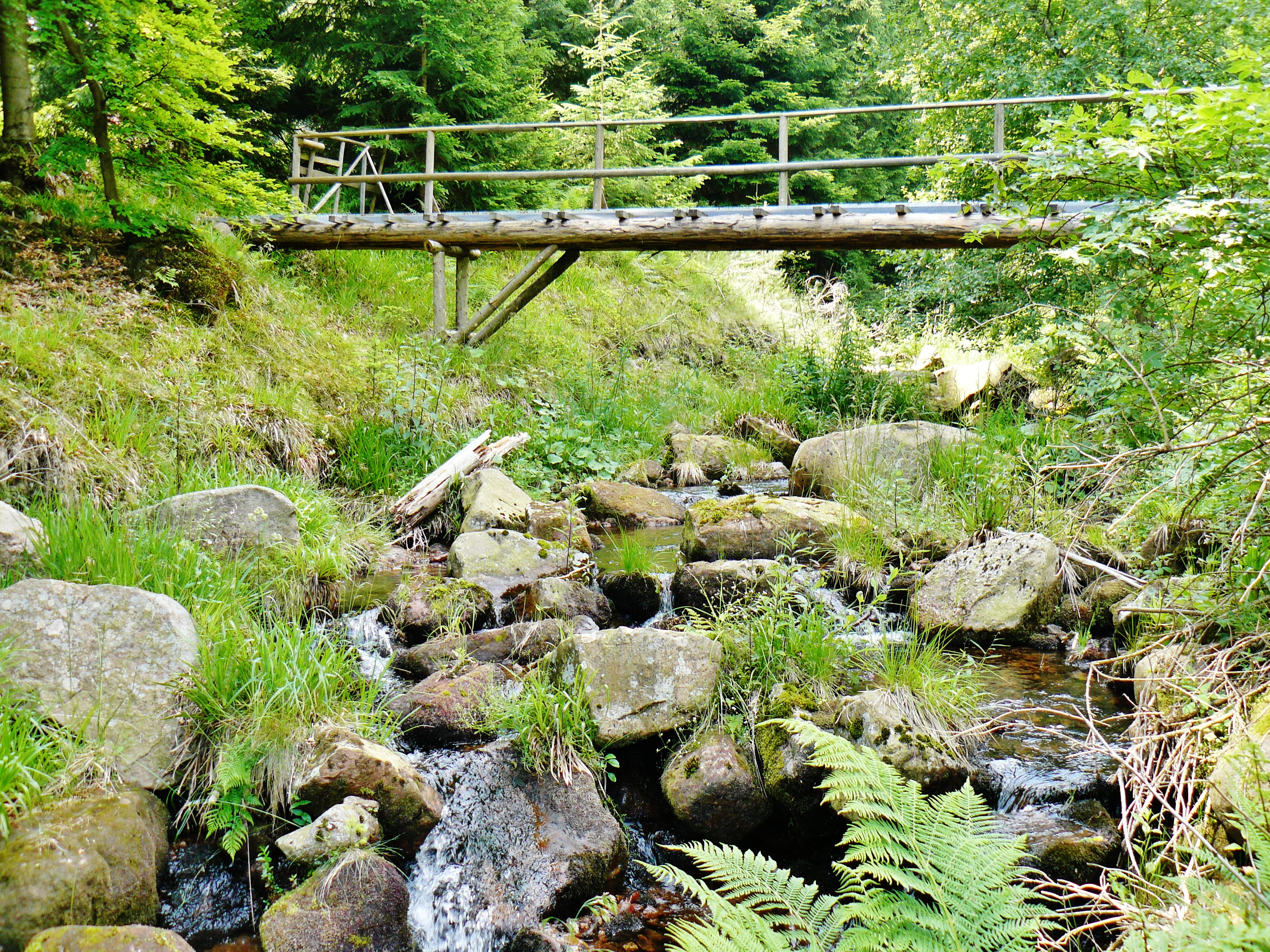

Location
- Country: Germany
- State: Baden-Württemberg

Physical characteristics
- Mouth
  - location: Eyach
  - coordinates: 48.7568°N 8.4842°E

Basin features
- Progression: Eyach→ Enz→ Neckar→ Rhine→ North Sea

Dürreych is a river of Baden-Württemberg, Germany. At its confluence with the Brotenaubach west of Bad Wildbad, the Eyach is formed.

== See also ==
- List of rivers of Baden-Württemberg

== Sources ==
- Dürreychprojekt – Forschungsarbeiten im hydrologischen Testgebiet Dürreychbachtal 1996–2001 (German)
