= Eyach (Enz) =

River in Germany

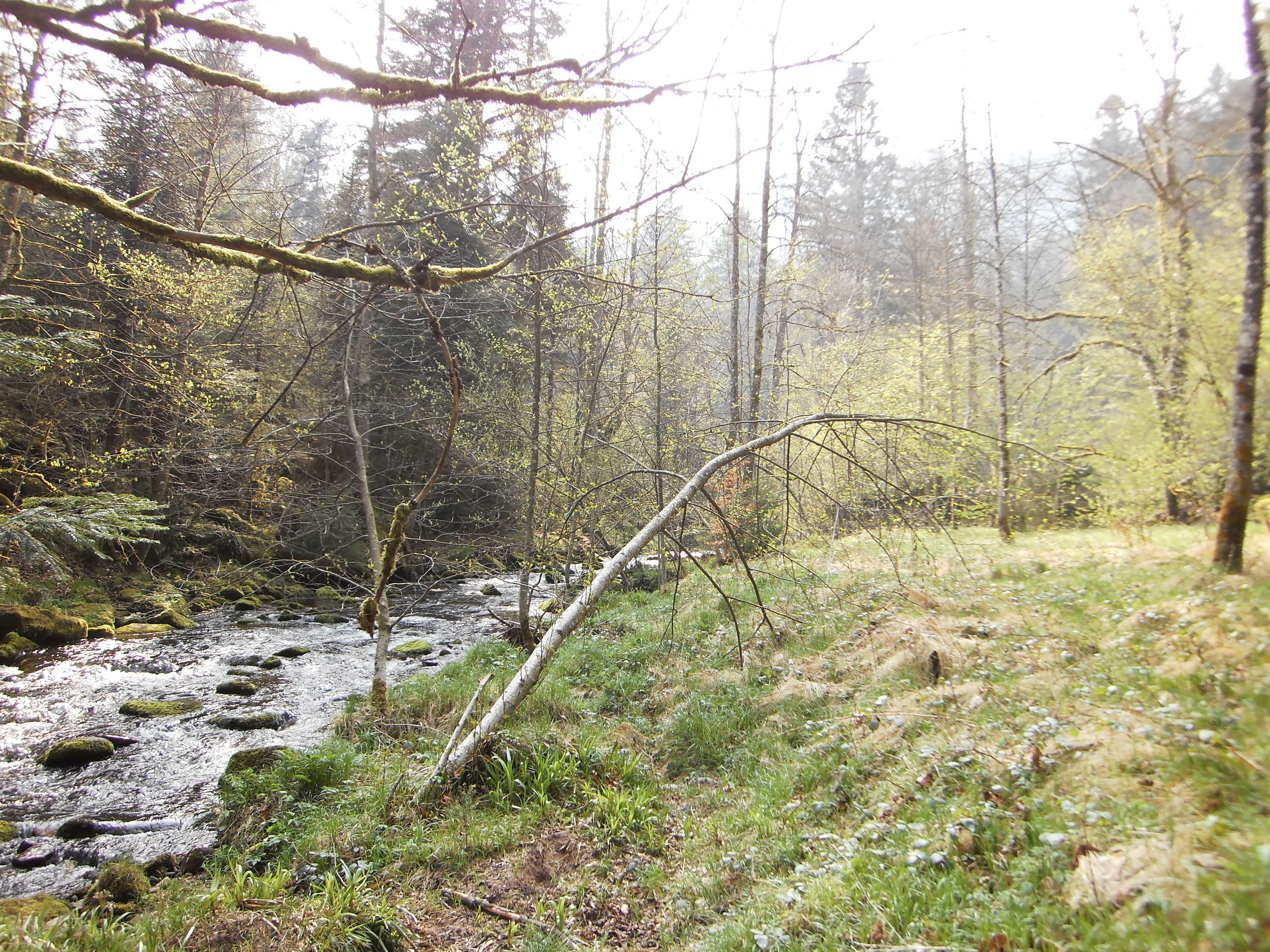

Location
- Country: Germany
- State: Baden-Württemberg

Physical characteristics
- Source
  - location: confluence of Brotenaubach and Dürreych
  - coordinates: 48.756806°N 8.484167°E
- Mouth
  - location: Enz
  - coordinates: 48.816306°N 8.578611°E
  - elevation: 355 m (1,165 ft)
- Length: 18.5 km (11.5 mi)
- Basin size: 52.7 km^{2} (20.3 sq mi)

Basin features
- Progression: Enz→ Neckar→ Rhine→ North Sea

The Eyach is a river in Baden-Württemberg, Germany. It is a left tributary of the Enz near Höfen an der Enz. Including its source river Brotenaubach, it is 18.5 km-long.

== See also ==
- List of rivers of Baden-Württemberg
