= Große Enz =

River in Germany

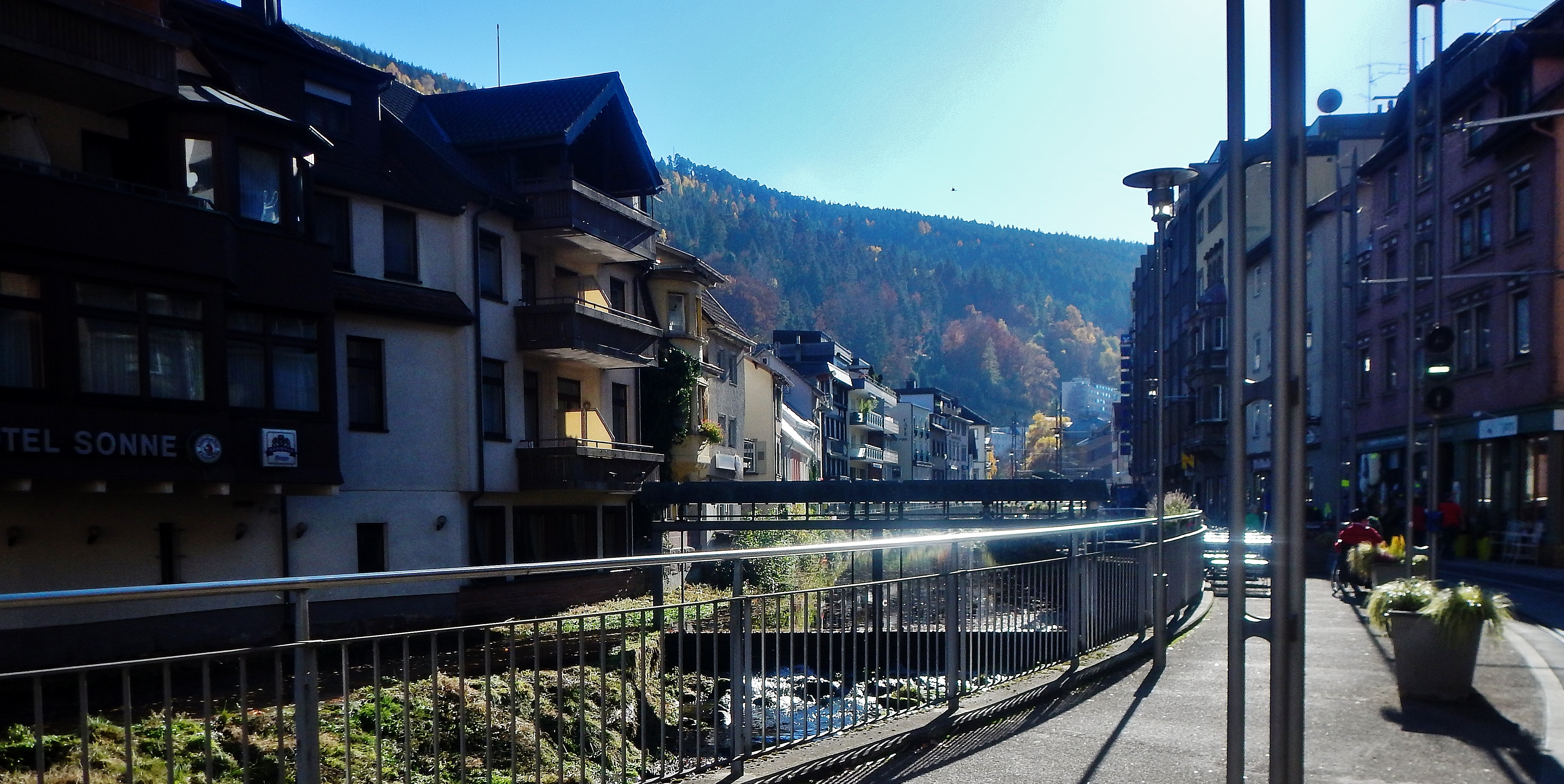
- Große Enz in Bad Wildbad

Location
- Country: Germany
- States: Baden-Württemberg

Physical characteristics
- Mouth
  - location: Enz
  - coordinates: 48.7770°N 8.5749°E

Basin features
- Progression: Enz→ Neckar→ Rhine→ North Sea

The Große Enz is a river of Baden-Württemberg, Germany. At its confluence with the Kleine Enz in Calmbach, the Enz is formed.

== See also ==
- List of rivers of Baden-Württemberg
