= Brotenaubach =

River in Germany

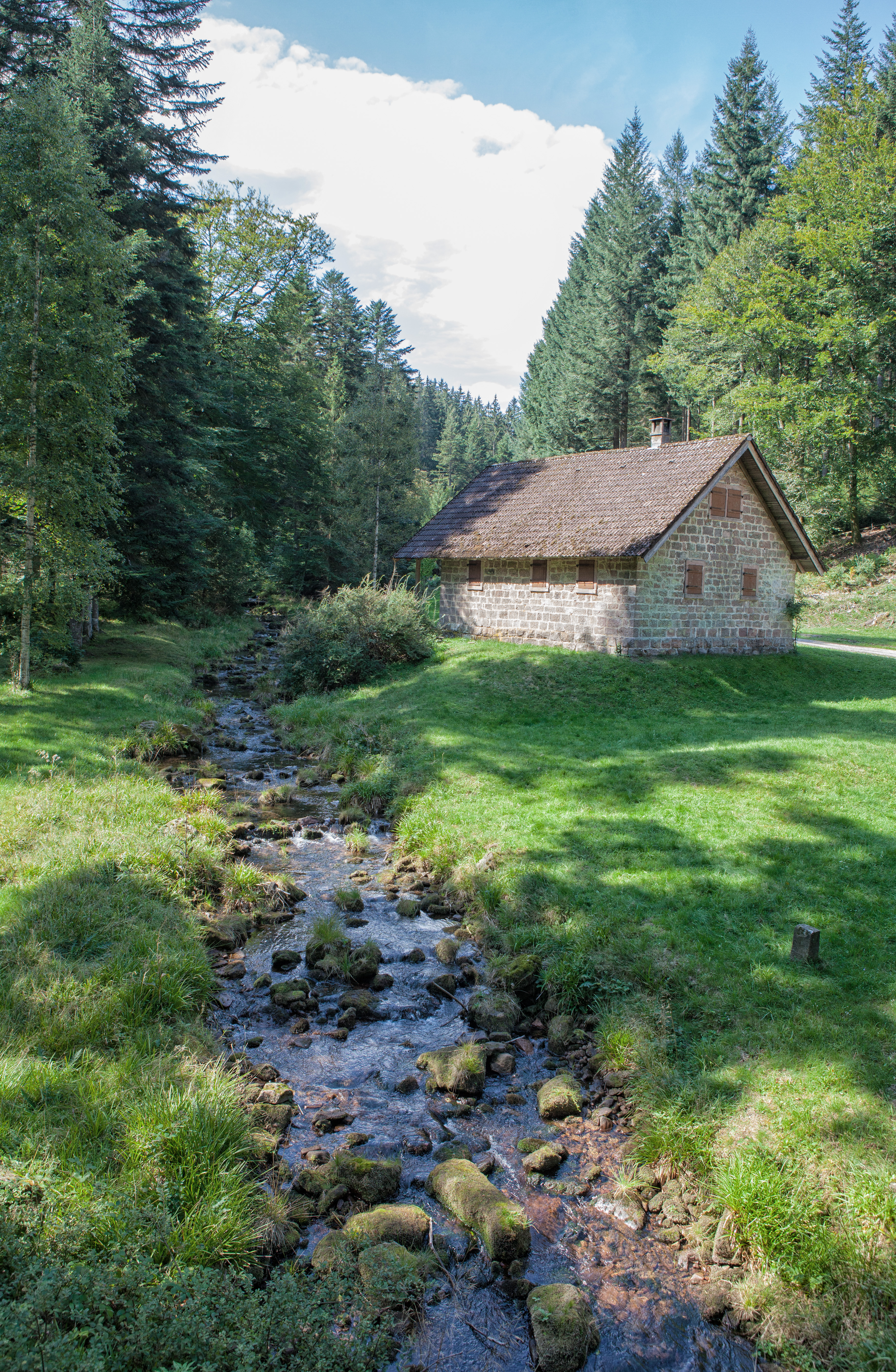
- The Brotenaubach at the Rotwasserhütte

Location
- Country: Germany
- State: Baden-Württemberg

Physical characteristics
- Source
  - location: Wildsee and Mannsloh
  - coordinates: 48.7183°N 8.4592°E
  - elevation: 930 m (3,050 ft)
- Mouth
  - location: Eyach
  - coordinates: 48.7568°N 8.4842°E
  - elevation: 570 m (1,870 ft)
- Length: 7.1 km (4.4 mi)

Basin features
- Progression: Eyach→ Enz→ Neckar→ Rhine→ North Sea

The Brotenaubach is a river in Baden-Württemberg, Germany. At its confluence with the Dürreych west of Bad Wildbad, the Eyach is formed.

== See also ==
- List of rivers of Baden-Württemberg
