= Lindenbach (Glems) =

River in Germany

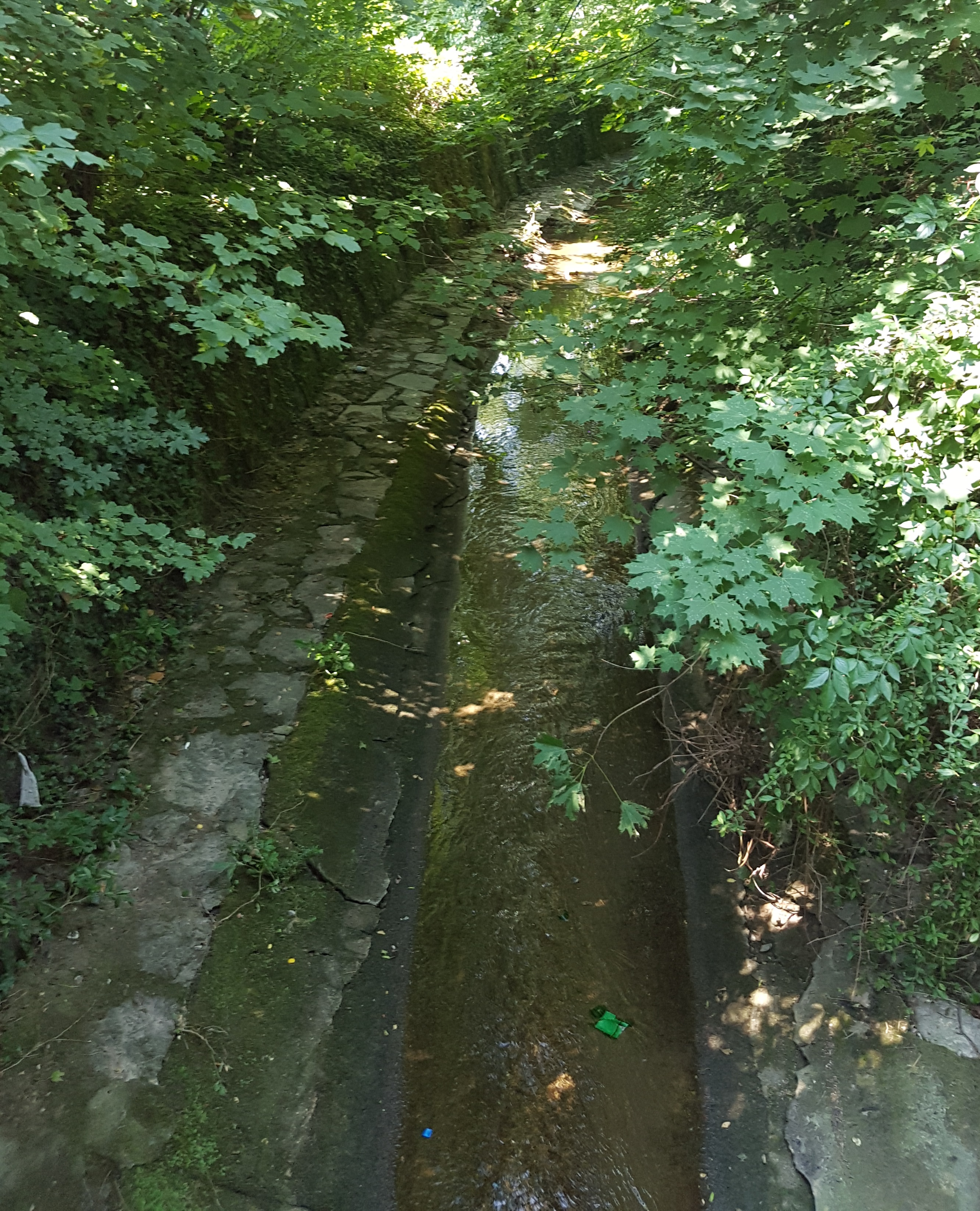

Location
- Country: Germany
- State: Baden-Württemberg

Physical characteristics
- Mouth
  - location: Glems
  - coordinates: 48.8295°N 9.0667°E
- Length: 10.6 km (6.6 mi)

Basin features
- Progression: Glems→ Enz→ Neckar→ Rhine→ North Sea

Lindenbach (in its upper course: Talgraben, in its upper course: Lachengraben) is a river of Baden-Württemberg, Germany. It is a right tributary of the Glems in Ditzingen.

== See also ==
- List of rivers of Baden-Württemberg
