= Enzklösterle =

German municipality

- Municipality
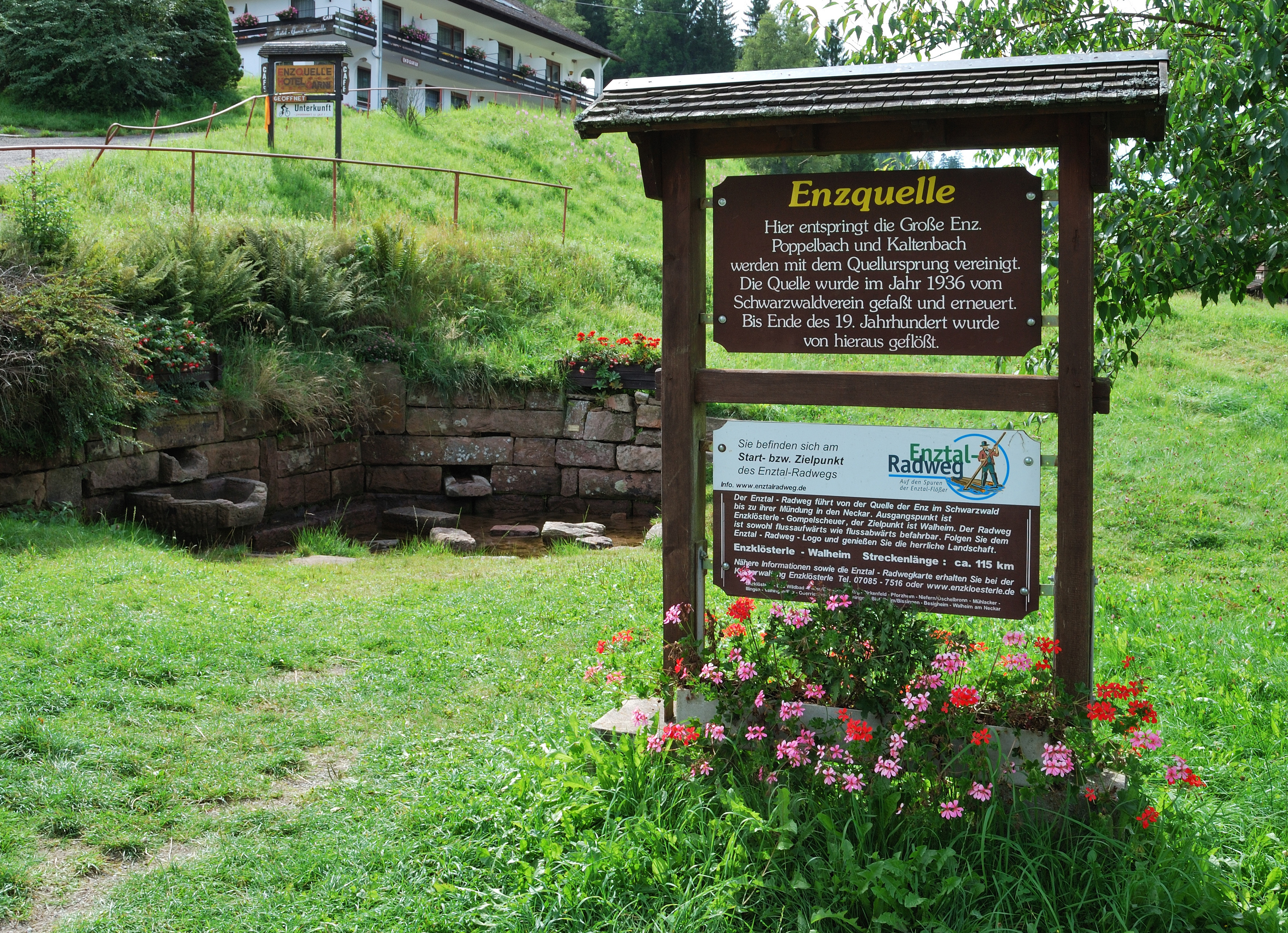
- Source of the Enz, Enzklösterle

- Coat of arms

- Location of Enzklösterle within Calw district
- Interactive map of Enzklösterle
- Location within Germany Location within Baden-Württemberg
- Coordinates: 48°40′5″N 8°28′17″E
- Country: Germany
- State: Baden-Württemberg
- Admin. region: Karlsruhe
- District: Calw

Government
  - Mayor (2022–30): Sabine Zenker (CDU)

Area
  - Total: 20.20 km^{2} (7.80 sq mi)
- Elevation: 590 m (1,940 ft)

Population (2025-12-31)
  - Total: 1,209
  - Density: 59.85/km^{2} (155.0/sq mi)
- Time zone: UTC+01:00 (CET)
  - Summer (DST): UTC+02:00 (CEST)
- Postal codes: 75337
- Dialling codes: 07085
- Vehicle registration: CW
- Website: www.enzkloesterle.eu

Enzklösterle is a municipality in the district of Calw in Baden-Württemberg, Germany.

== History ==
Enzklösterle was first mentioned in a document from 1323 as "Klösterlein ze der Entz". It became a possession of the County of Württemberg between the years 1323 and 1345. In 1599, the Duke of Württemberg established a managed forest in Enzklösterle, which would have a lasting impact on the region's economy. In 1826, Enzklösterle, which had been an estate of Wildberg, was made an independent municipality and was assigned to Oberamt Neuenbürg. The village of Enztal was incorporated into Enzklösterle in 1935, forming the present boundaries of the municipality. Oberamt Neuenbürg was dissolved in 1938 and Enzklösterle was subsequently assigned to the district of Calw.

== Geography ==
The municipality (Gemeinde) of Enzklösterle is situated on the western edge of the district of Calw, along the border with the districts of Freudenstadt and Rastatt to the west. Enzklösterle is physically located in the valley of the Großen Enz, in the Northern Black Forest and Grinde regions. Elevation above sea level in the municipal area ranges from a high of 924 meters (3,031 ft) Normalnull (NN) at the top of the Hirschkopf to a low of 563 meters (1,847 ft) NN.

== Politics ==
Enzklösterle has one borough (Ortsteil), Enzklösterle, eight villages – Gompelscheuer, Hetschelhof, Lappach, Mittelenztal, Petersmühle, Poppeltal, Rohnbuch, and Süßbächle – and the industrial district of Enztal. The abandoned villages of Birkenäckerle, Boppelseehaus, Kaltbronn, and Zwickgabel are also located in the municipal area. Enzklösterle is in an mutually-beneficial municipal association with the township of Bad Wildbad and the municipality of Höfen an der Enz.

=== Coat of arms ===
Enzklösterle's coat of arms shows a yellow raft upon a blue, wavy bend dexter over a field of yellow. The raft is a reference to Enzklösterle's history of forestry, and the wavy bend the river Enz. This coat of arms was issued on 25 May 1950 by the provisional post-WWII Württemberg-Hohenzollern government.

== Transportation ==
Enzklösterle is connected to Germany's network of roadways by Bundesstraße 294. Local public transportation is provided by the Verkehrsgesellschaft Bäderkreis Calw.
