= Golfanlage Schloss Nippenburg =

Golf course in Stuttgart, Germany

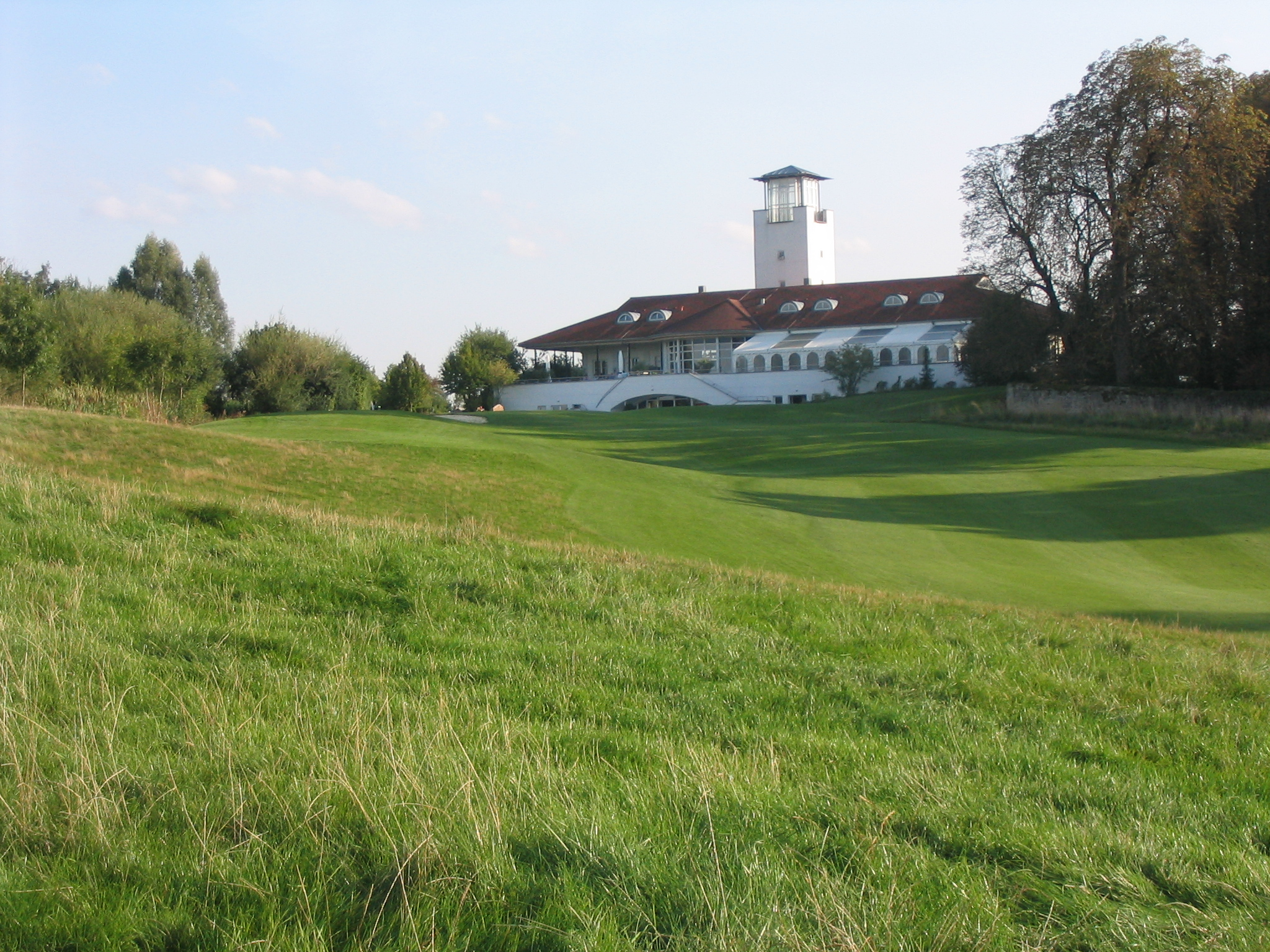
- Interactive map of Golfanlage Schloss Nippenburg
- 48°51′50″N 9°04′10″E

Club information
- Location: Schwieberdingen, Germany
- Established: 1995
- Type: Private
- Tota holes: 18
- Tournaments: German Open
- Website: www.schlossnippenburg.de
- Designed by: Bernhard Langer
- Par: 71
- Length: 6154 meters

Golfanlage Schloss Nippenburg is a golf course in Schwieberdingen, located on the northwestern edge of Stuttgart, Germany. The 18-hole course has its name from castle Nippenburg, located next the golf course.

The par 71 course was designed by Bernhard Langer and was established in 1995.

From 1995 to 1997 the Golfanlage Schloss Nippenburg hosted the German Open. The tournament was won by Colin Montgomerie in 1995, Ian Woosnam in 1996 and Ignacio Garrido in 1997.
