= Lindenbach =

Lindenbach may refer to:

- Lindenbach (Glems), a river of Baden-Württemberg, Germany, tributary of the Glems
- Lindenbach (Kahl), a river of Bavaria, Germany, tributary of the Kahl
- Lindenbach (Inn), a river of Upper Austria, tributary of the Inn
