= Jakob Friedrich Wanner =

German-born Swiss architect (1830–1903)

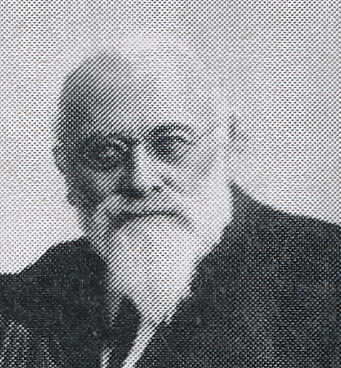
- Born: Jakob Friedrich Wanner; 28 April 1830; Illingen, Kingdom of Württemberg
- Died: 24 January 1903 (aged 72); Zürich, Switzerland
- Citizenship: Kingdom of Württemberg (until 1867); Switzerland (after 1867)
- Occupation: Architect
- Known for: Principal architect for Credit Suisse headquarters and Zurich Main Station
- Spouse: Catharina Kaufmann (m. 1853)
- Children: 2+

Jakob Friedrich Wanner (28 April 1830 – 24 January 1903) was a German-born Swiss architect who was primarily active in Zürich, Switzerland. Among his notable works are the headquarters of Credit Suisse at Paradeplatz and Zurich Main Station.

== Biography ==
Wanner was born in Illingen, Kingdom of Württemberg to Johann Jakob Wanner and Dorothea Magdalena (née Joerger). Initially, he completed an apprenticeship as draftsman and worked as construction supervisor in Stuttgart. On 7 April 1853, he married Catharina Kaufmann (born 1833), they had one son Paul Hermann (born 1855). In 1857, they emigrated to Switzerland, where he found employment with Swiss Northeastern Railway then directly governed by Alfred Escher. Through his engagement, he was involved in building the train stations of Frauenfeld and Winterthur.

After briefly serving as city architect of Zürich, he returned to the Swiss Northeastern Railway in 1861, this time as principal architect. Until 1871, he was the principal in creating the train stations in Zug (1897 transferred to Zürich-Wollishofen), Schaffhausen (in a joint-venture with Grand Duchy of Baden State Railways) and the Zurich Main Station (using a project draft of Gottfried Semper). In 1867, Wanner and his family became Swiss citizens, naturalizing in Zürich. Between 1872 and 1877, he was the architect for creating the headquarters of Credit Suisse at Paradeplatz. Since 1878, he operated an independent practice. Wanner died from a stroke on 24 January 1903.

== Literature ==
- Werner Stutz: Bahnhöfe der Schweiz. Von den Anfängen bis zum Ersten Weltkrieg. Orell Füssli, Zürich 1983, ISBN 3-280-01405-0. (in German)
