= Nippenburg =

Castle in Baden-Württemberg, Germany

Nippenburg Castle
- Ludwigsburg, Baden-Württemberg; Near Schwieberdingen in Germany
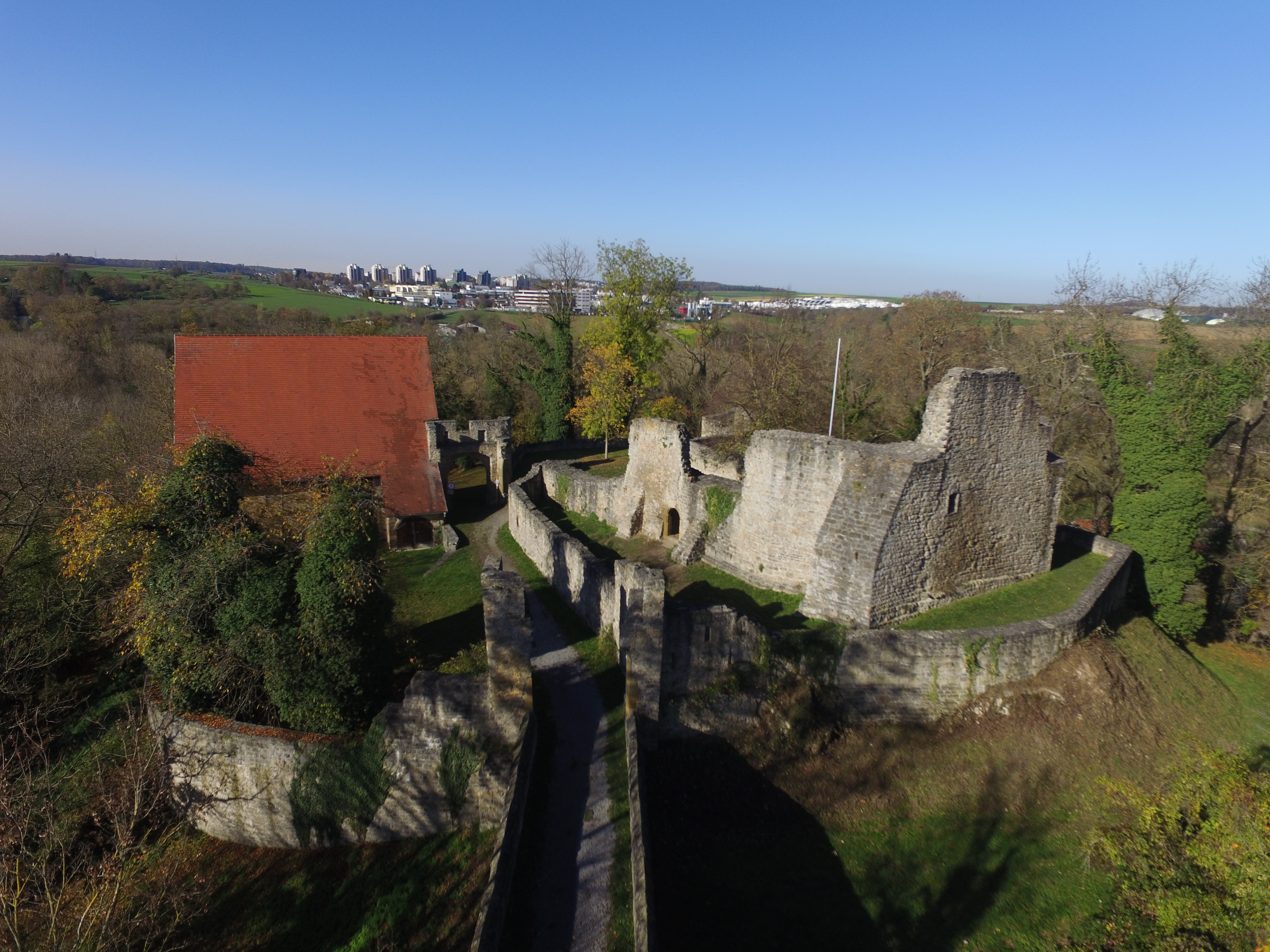
- Nippenburg Castle, c. 2010

Site information
- Type: Spornburg
- Open to the public: Yes

Location
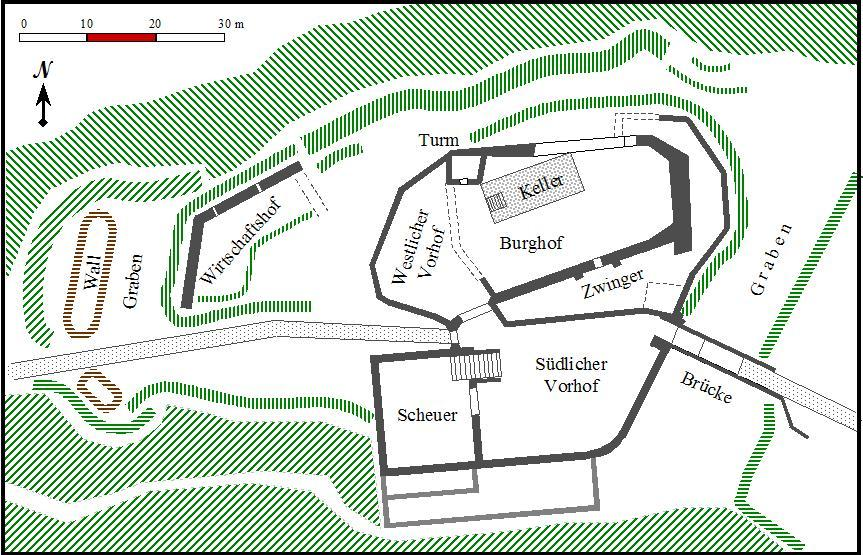
- The Nippenburg
- Location in Baden-Württemberg Nippenburg Castle (Germany)
- Coordinates: 48°51′41″N 9°3′30″E

Site history
- Built: 1100
- In use: 1721

Nippenburg, both the ruined castle built on a mountain spur overlooking the Glems river valley and the farming village it was constructed in, is located 295 m above sea level (NN) and 14 kilometres (8.7 mi) from Stuttgart's city center near the town of Schwieberdingen. The oldest record of Nippenburg's existence is from the Codex Hirsaugiensis of 1160, making it among the oldest castles in the vicinity of Stuttgart. Today, all that remains of the castle is the high curtain wall and outer bailey and a large barn built in 1483, thanks to a short-lived effort in the early 1980s to restore these structures.

== History ==
The Nippenburg castle was built by a local family of Knights in the Twelfth Century, though it could have originally been built in the 9th Century.

In the 17th century, the castle was positioned favorably: lying on a mountain spur-over half the Glems valley and built in direct proximity to the manor-house lock Nippenburg. In following centuries the castle was heavily quarried and abandoned. The ruins show a construction with high walls and fortifications as well as a substantial scrub. In the 1980s, the building was partially restored to its 1483 condition.

Nippenburg Castle was probably built for military purposes in the 12th century by a local noble family. It is considered the oldest castle ruin in the Stuttgart area. The castle was first mentioned in documents in the Codex Hirsaugiensis, which testifies to a mill built by a berwart "below the Nippenburg" for 1160. In 1283, a prominent rendezvous took place at the Nippenburg: Guests of Frederick of Nippenburg (dictus Urrus de Nippenburc) were the Lower Swabian imperial bailiff Count Albrecht II. of Hohenberg, Count Eberhard I. of Württemberg, Count Konrad III. von Vaihingen and the provost Dietrich von Beutelsbach as well as numerous clergymen, noblemen and ministers mainly from the area between Sindelfingen and Pforzheim, who all testified to a comparison of the inheritance of the lords of Nippenburg and the lords of Enzberg around the castle Kapfenhart near Weissach.

The original castle complex of the lords of Nippenburg has been extended several times over the years. For example, the kennel in front of the curtain wall dates from the first half of the 14th century. The outer bailey with the massive barn still preserved today was built towards the end of the 15th century.

Due to the newly developed explosive projectiles and the resulting replacement of catapults with mortars and cannons, the castle complexes could no longer offer the inhabitants sufficient protection. Since the castles were only cold, wet and uncomfortable to live in, they were increasingly abandoned. Around 1600 the construction of the manor house Schloss Nippenburg above the castle complex was therefore begun, which was extended and altered in the 18th and 19th centuries.

When Wilhelm, the last knight of Nippenburg, built the manor house, he had stones broken out of the castle and used them as building material for his new manor house. After the castle itself was inhabited until about 1700, it was left to decay in the following centuries. At what point in time the castle was completely abandoned as a place of residence and protection cannot be exactly determined. For example, a stove plate from 1770 found during restoration work indicates that the castle was still partially inhabited later. However, correspondence between the bailiffs of Grueningen and Leonberg, who fought in 1647 and 1648 over well-preserved boards and beams of the Nippenburg, shows that parts of the buildings within the castle had already been abandoned at this time and that the remaining remains of the castle were used until it was finally only a ruin. Over time, ivy and shrubs covered the remains of the walls. Only the storerooms and storerooms of the castle were used by the inhabitants of the manor house for a long time.

In the 1960s and 1970s the plan to restore the desolate walls matured. To preserve the castle ruins, extensive restoration measures were carried out on the walls, which were in danger of collapsing, between 1979 and 1984. The costs for this were borne by the State Monument Office of Baden-Württemberg, the municipality of Schwieberdingen, the current owner, Count Leutrum, and the district of Ludwigsburg. Today the ruins of Nippenburg Castle are a popular destination for excursions.

== Legends and Sagas ==
The Nippenburg, a medieval castle situated in the Glemstal valley, has been surrounded by an array of sagas and legends. According to one such legend, a past battle fought in the marshy terrain of the Glemstal valley resulted in every warrior being lost to the moor.

The knight Christoph von Hemmingen came to Nippenburg and wooed the only daughter of a resident knight there. von Hemmingen courted the daughter and later married her, however one night the young bride was unable to locate her home and tragically became lost in a bog on her journey. Despite her cries for help, no one was able to rescue her and her whereabouts were only discovered the following day with the only remnant of her being a handkerchief. Grief-stricken, Christoph von Hemmingen enlisted in the emperor's army in order to distract himself from the tragedy. Unfortunately, even during the war, he was unable to forget his young bride and the terrible misfortune.

Following his completion of military service, it is said that Christoph von Hemmingen entered a monastery where he devoted his life to naturopathy. In his latter years he returned to the area of his great love but few people recognised him, as many decades had passed and only a few people remained who remembered the events of that time. However, word of his presence spread among the people, who began to seek him out for cures to their various ailments. In return, they brought him food and drink, and worshipped him as a saint. With their assistance, a small church was constructed below the Nippenburg. One morning, when someone knocked on his door, all was quiet; he had died in his hut. Upon discovery of his body, a golden cross was found under his habit, inscribed with the words “Ritter Christoph von Hemmingen” and “Love never ends”. This location is still referred to today as the “Mohrkirchle”.

The Nippenburg is noted for its association with various ghost stories. It is said that Count Hans buried his fortune at the Nippenburg, and his spirit was said to continue to watch over it. The Schwieberdingen quarry is said to be the haunt of a headless horseman, whose horse is said to have its mane and tail plaited in pigtails by ghosts. The Nippenburg's watchtower, the Käppele, is alleged to be visited by a spirit known as the Käppelesgeist, who is said to descend from the Nippenburg to Schwieberdingen at night. It is advised to avoid travelling to Schwieberdingen at night due to these stories.

== See also ==
- Golfanlage Golf Nippenburg
