= Kleine Enz =

River in Germany

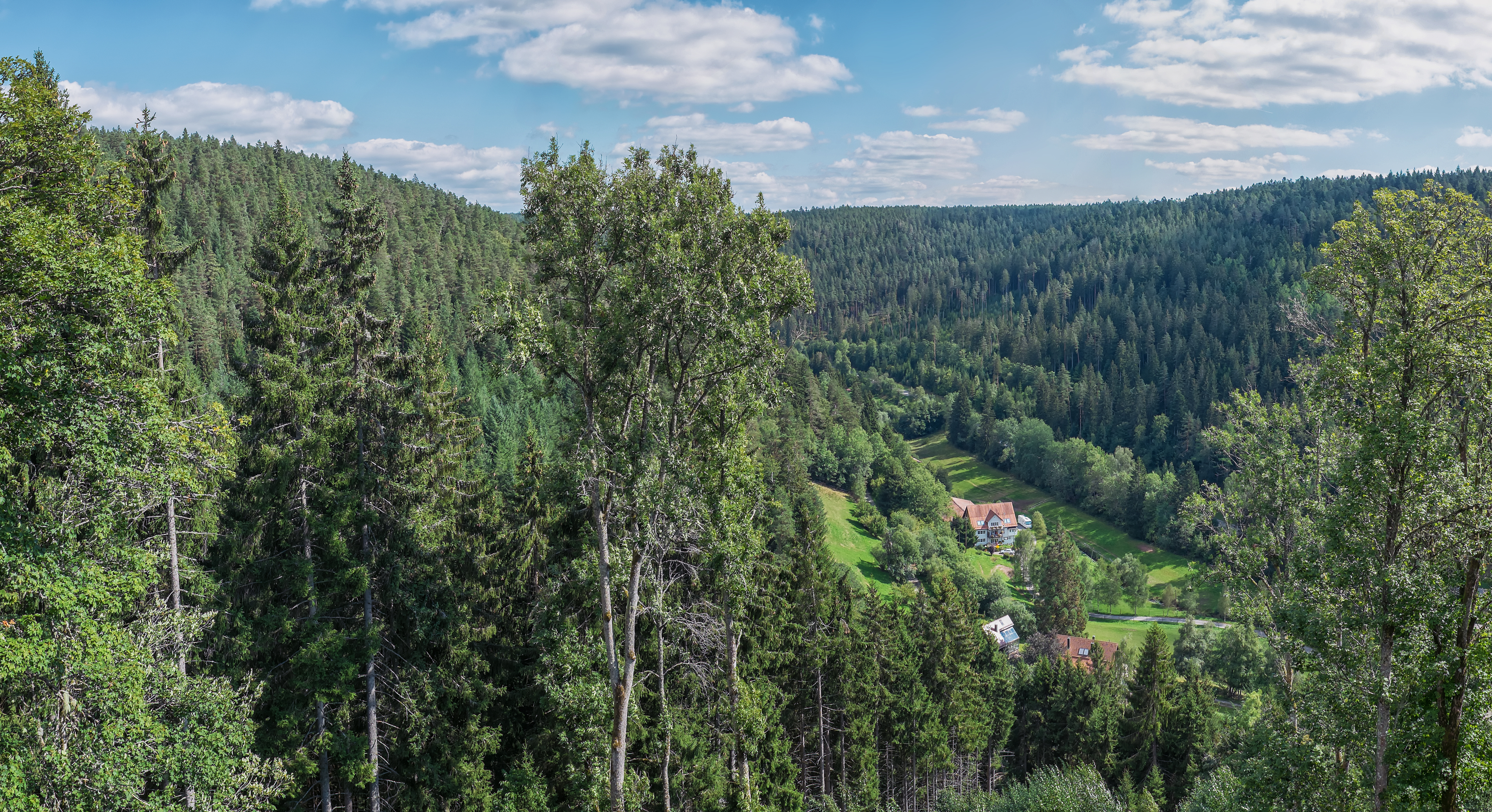

Location
- Country: Germany
- State: Baden-Württemberg

Physical characteristics
- Mouth
  - location: Enz
  - coordinates: 48.7770°N 8.5749°E
- Length: 20.2 km (12.6 mi)

Basin features
- Progression: Enz→ Neckar→ Rhine→ North Sea

The Kleine Enz ("Little Enz") is a river of Baden-Württemberg, Germany. It is 20 kilometers in length. At its confluence with the Große Enz in Calmbach, the Enz is formed.

== See also ==
- List of rivers of Baden-Württemberg
