= Markgröningen =

- Town
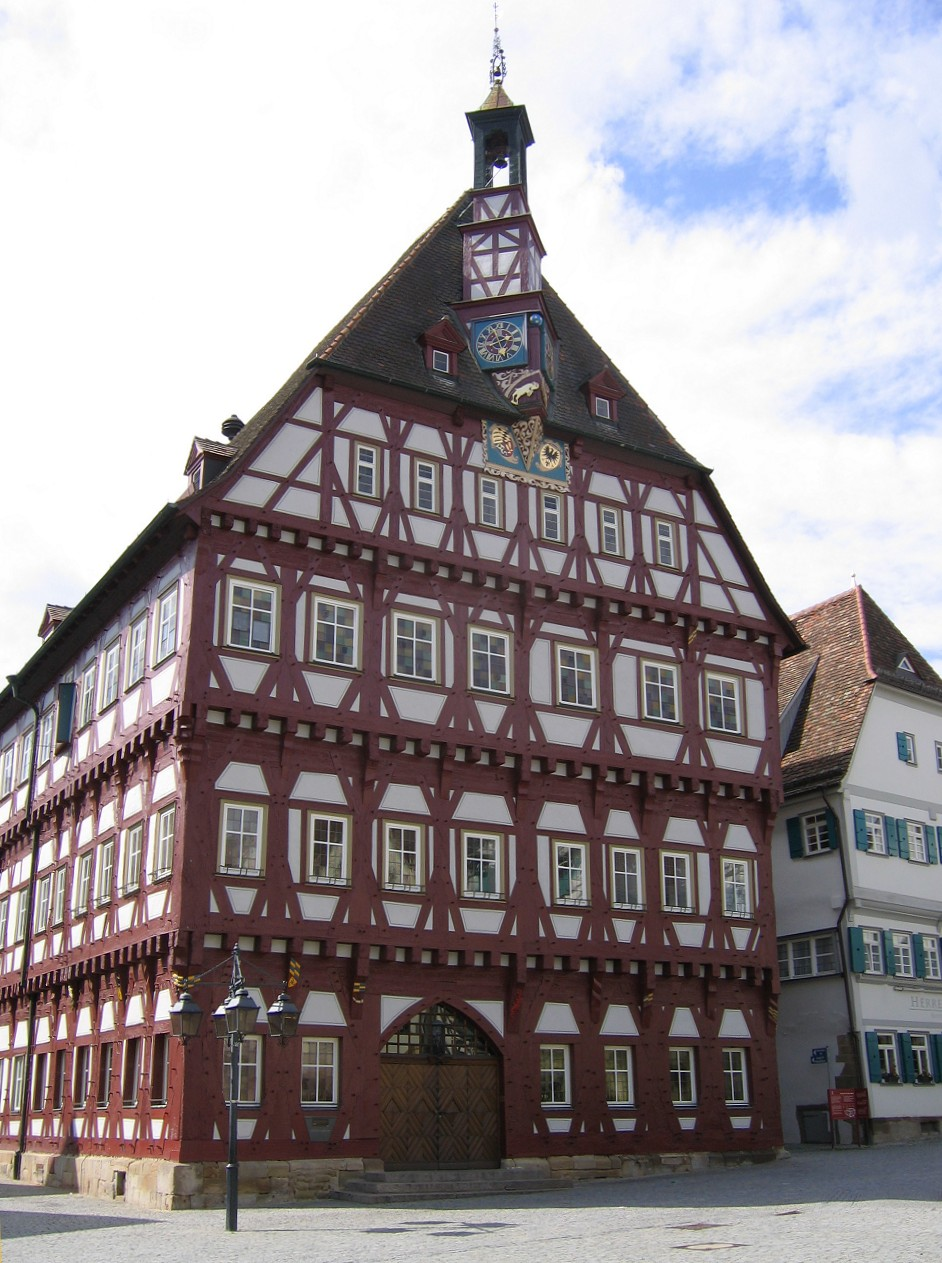
- Town hall

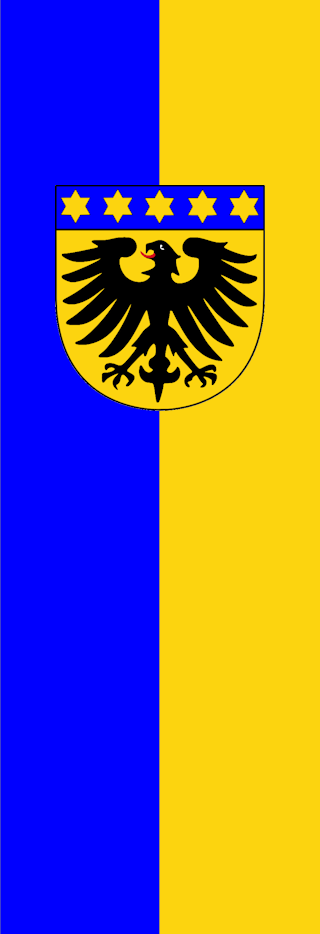
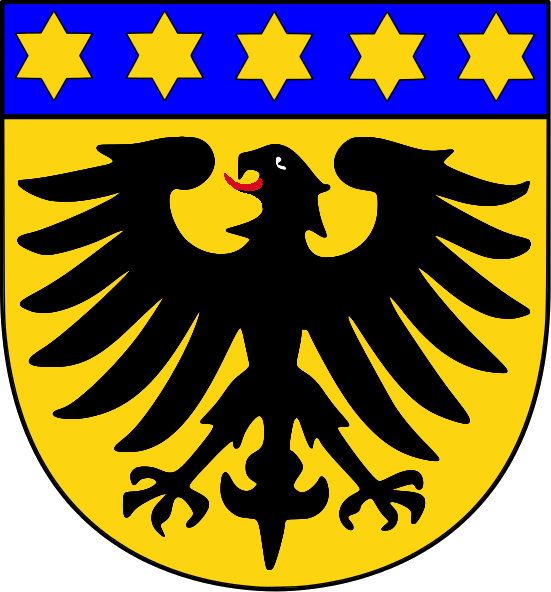
- Flag Coat of arms

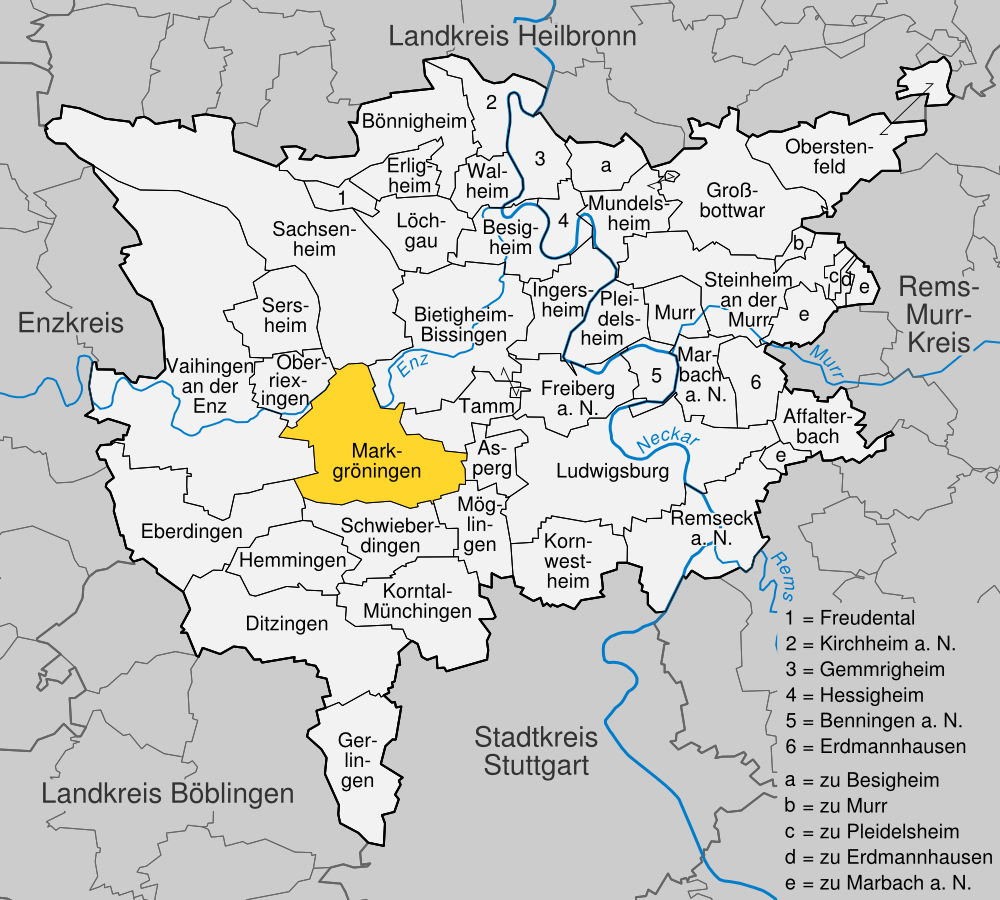
- Location of Markgröningen within Ludwigsburg district
- Interactive map of Markgröningen
- Location within Germany Location within Baden-Württemberg
- Coordinates: 48°54′17″N 9°4′51″E
- Country: Germany
- State: Baden-Württemberg
- Admin. region: Stuttgart
- District: Ludwigsburg

Government
  - Mayor (2022–30): Jens Hübner (SPD)

Area
  - Total: 28.15 km^{2} (10.87 sq mi)
- Elevation: 281 m (922 ft)

Population (2025-12-31)
  - Total: 14,052
  - Density: 499.2/km^{2} (1,293/sq mi)
- Time zone: UTC+01:00 (CET)
  - Summer (DST): UTC+02:00 (CEST)
- Postal codes: 71706
- Dialling codes: Markgröningen: 07145 Unterriexingen: 07147
- Vehicle registration: LB
- Website: www.markgroeningen.de

Markgröningen (German pronunciation: [maʁkˈɡʁøːnɪŋən]) is a town in the district (Kreis) of Ludwigsburg, Baden-Württemberg, Germany. It is known for its fine historic buildings, many in the Fachwerk German architectural style, and its annual Shepherds' Run. Markgröningen is on the Deutsche Fachwerkstraße (German Timber-Frame Road).

== Geography ==
Markgröningen is in the Strohgäu, on the River Glems, about 15 km northwest of Stuttgart and 10 km west of Ludwigsburg.

=== Constituent communities ===
In addition to Markgröningen itself, the town now includes the following formerly independent settlements:

- Talhausen, a hamlet on the Glems abandoned in the 17th century and resettled around 1790
- Unterriexingen, a town at the confluence of the Glems and the Enz, incorporated into Markgröningen in 1973
- Hardthof and Schönbühlhof, founded as agricultural hamlets in the 18th century on the border with Schwieberdingen

== History ==
Markgröningen (or simply “Gröningen,” as some older residents may call it) is first mentioned in 779 in a deed of gift to the Monastery of Fulda, as Gruoninga. Mark was added to the name later to indicate its position in the "march" or border area between Frankish and Alemannic territory.

Around 1243 the settlement of Markgröningen was raised to the status of town. It was a fief of the Holy Roman Emperor, responsible for guarding two important travel routes. In 1229, the town briefly became a free imperial city. As a result, it has the Imperial eagle on its arms; the blue bar with gold stars was added in the mid-16th century as a distinguishing mark. However, in 1336, the House of Württemberg acquired the town and made it a seat of government. Later, during the temporary division of Württemberg between 1441 and 1482, it was a primary seat.

Of considerable importance to Markgröningen, the Spital (pilgrims' hostelry), a foundation of the Order of the Holy Spirit, was consecrated in 1297. The order began construction of the present Church of the Holy Spirit around 1300. By 1354, the town had a Latin school, by 1429 a bathhouse. These three were hallmarks of superiority in a medieval town.

Markgröningen experienced its greatest flowering in the second half of the 15th century. Numerous buildings that shape the look of the town today originate from that period, such as the “Ratstüble” restaurant – built in 1414 – and the "Crown" hotel – built in 1428. These two buildings stand on either side of the gothic Fachwerk Town Hall (Rathaus), established in 1441.

After the Reformation, the possessions of the Order of the Holy Spirit were taken over by the lord of the manor and the Spital has been run by the town since 1552. Collection of harvest produce against future famine in the Fachwerk storehouse, (Fruchtkasten), continued, and merchants built Renaissance houses.

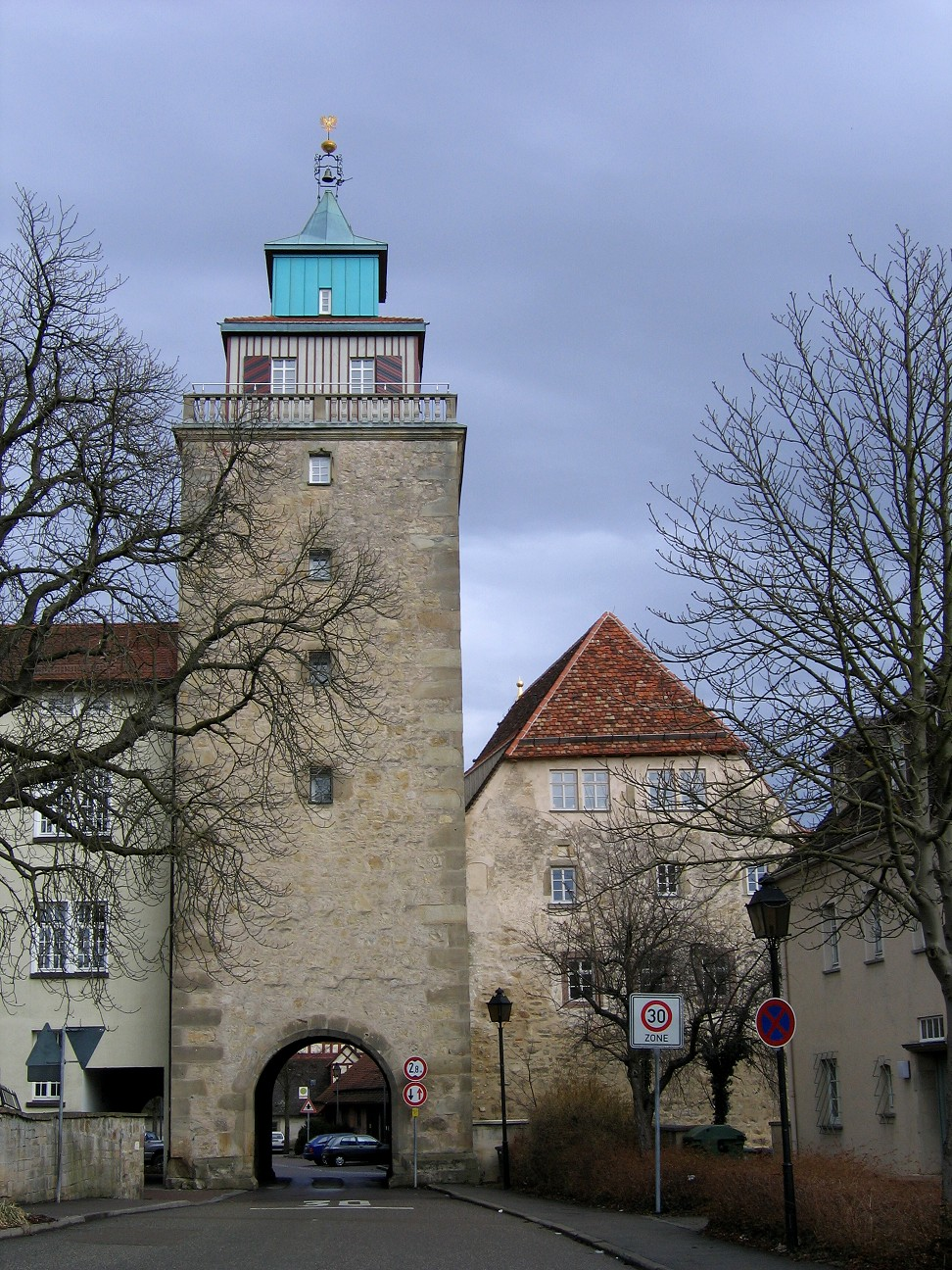
Oberer Torturm, the only remaining town gate, dating to 1555

Like many places in Germany, Markgröningen suffered during the Thirty Years' War; the nearby town of Asperg was largely destroyed in a siege. Then in the 18th century the town lost its political importance and much of its outlying possessions to the newly founded city of Ludwigsburg, and went into decline. With no railroad access, little industry developed, although nearby Talhausen had several water-powered facilities. Population pressures led to formation of new settlements and to large-scale emigration to the United States. In 1833–1845, the town walls were demolished, enabling expansion. Only one of the four gates survives today, der Obere Torturm, "the upper gate-tower," built in 1555. Finally, in 1916, Markgröningen succeeded in obtaining a rail link, but the line was not continued further as desired. Since 1975 there has been no more passenger service.

During the Nazi era, 120 residents of the home for the disabled in Markgröningen were euthanized, and 363 people, mostly Jews, at the labor camp in Unterriexingen died.

In 2006, the air quality in Markgröningen was rated third worst in Baden-Württemberg; the problem has been greatly alleviated by construction of a bypass to the east.

== The Shepherds' Run ==
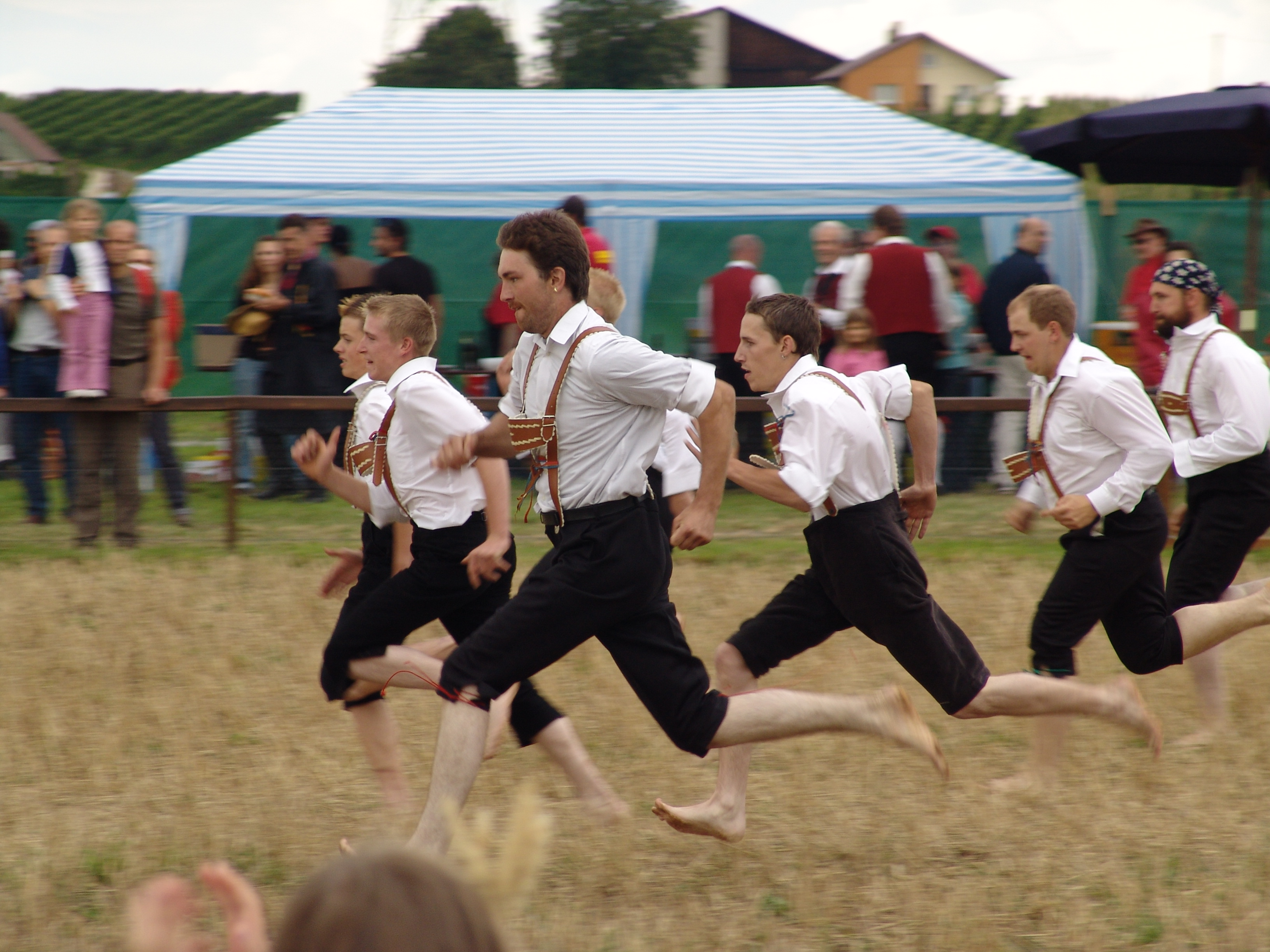
Markgröningen Shepherds' Run, 2006

Every year on the last weekend in August, shepherds from all over Baden-Württemberg meet in Markgröningen. Originally held by the Shepherds' Guild, since the abolition of the guilds in 1828 the festival has been held by the town of Markgröningen. Formerly it took place on St. Bartholomew's Day, August 24, but since 1961 has been held on the last weekend in August.

The Shepherds' Run has a long tradition in Markgröningen. The first written reference to the celebration occurs in 1445 in the records of the Spital. There are many legends regarding its origin, all mentioning the figure of the “faithful shepherd Bartel," in whose honor a Count of Württemberg is said to have established the festival.

In 1723 the Shepherds' Guild, which was based in Markgröningen, was divided into four parts and established regional offices in Heidenheim, Urach, and Wildberg. In former times the guild held an obligatory meeting on St. Bartholomew's Day at which it was customary to have hearings, resolve disputes, and release apprentices. The fixed form of the festival today dates to a ducal order of 1651, which granted the right to hold the celebrations.

The festival takes place over a long weekend. On the Friday, spectators can catch a glimpse of the life of a shepherd by watching the sheepherding contest, in which shepherds compete at sheeptending tasks in the Markgröningen fields. The seven stages of the contest consist of the ten most important tasks in the everyday life of the shepherd, and thus make up a microcosm of a sheepherding day.

The actual "shepherds' run," the centerpiece of the festival, takes place on the Saturday. First shepherds' daughters and trained female shepherds, dressed prettily in red, white, and green skirts, then male shepherds, race barefoot over a stubble field 300 paces (240 meters) long. The winners receive a sheep as a prize and are crowned Shepherd Queen and Shepherd King, respectively. Following their coronation, the shepherd dance pays homage to the royal couple.

The race is preceded by a ceremonial mass, a colorful procession to the race field featuring many bands and groups in traditional costumes and also several sheep, and traditional games such as sack races and water-carrying. Following the race, the procession returns to the town square for the dancing. On the Sunday many of the festivities are repeated, including the procession, but this time children from the local schools run the races while adults compete separately at water-carrying and stilt-walking.

Since 1963, the festival has lasted through Monday and ends with a fireworks display. It also includes a market of traditional crafts, a funfair, and a petting zoo.

The festival was cancelled in 2020 and 2021 due to the COVID-19 pandemic.

== Sources ==
- Max Mertz, Erich Tomschik, Maria Lenk, Lothar Buck. Markgröningen: Das Bild der Stadt im Wandel der Zeit. Verlag des Arbeitskreises Geschichtsforschung Heimat- und Denkmalpflege Markgröningen, 1969. OCLC 26502074
- Hermann Römer. Markgröningen im Rahmen der Landesgeschichte. Volume 1 Urgeschichte und Mittelalter. Volume 2 1550–1750. Markgröningen: Renczes, 1933, 1930. OCLC 312370398, 312370852
- Petra Schad, Martin Frieß. Siebenhundert Jahre Heilig-Geist-Spital Markgröningen. Markgröningen, 1997. ISBN 3-929948-06-0
