= Nesenbach =

River in Germany

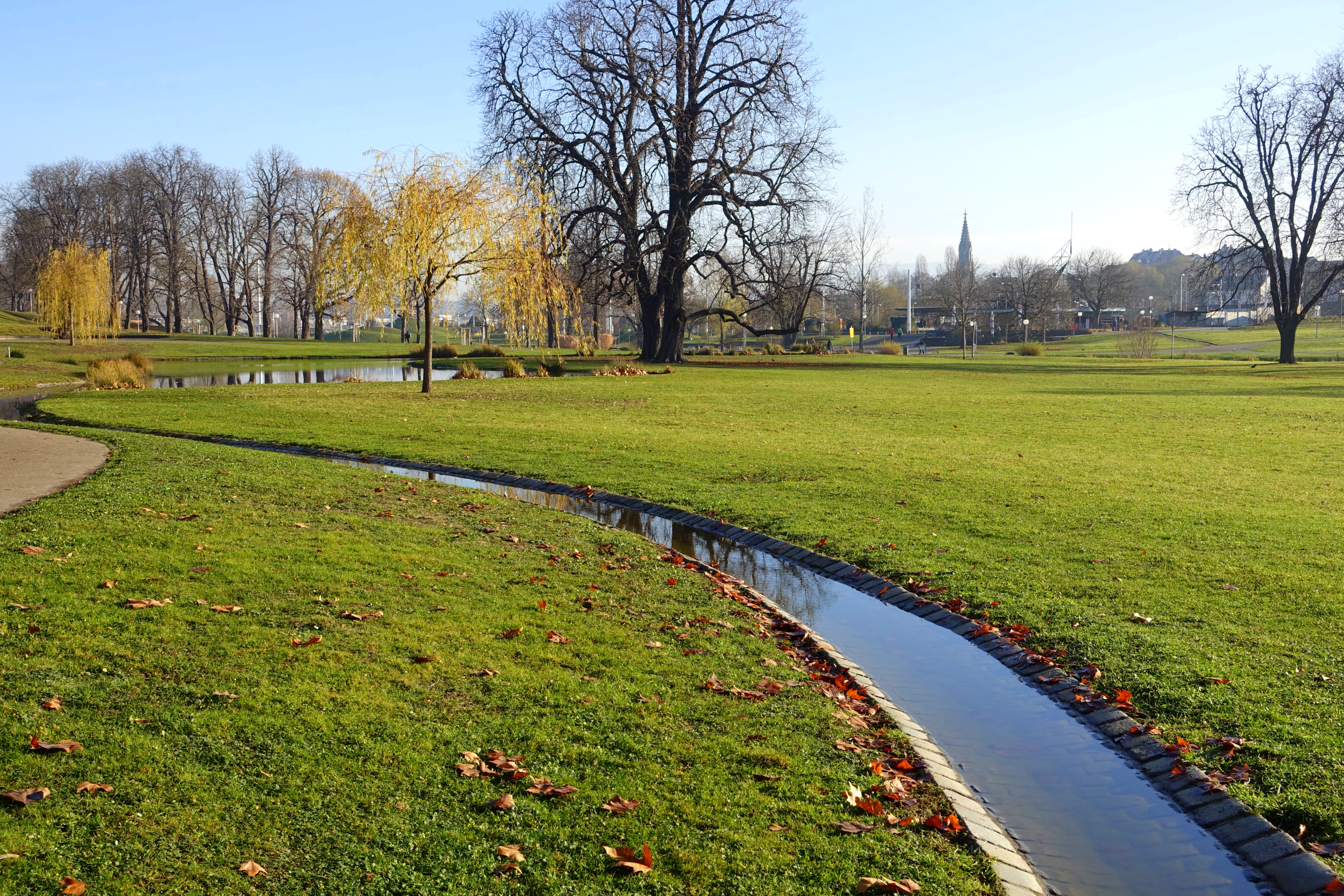

Location
- Country: Germany
- State: Baden-Württemberg

Physical characteristics
- Mouth
  - location: Neckar
  - coordinates: 48.7997°N 9.2096°E
- Length: 12.8 km (8.0 mi)

Basin features
- Progression: Neckar→ Rhine→ North Sea

The Nesenbach is a stream in Stuttgart, the capital of Baden-Württemberg, Germany. It is a tributary of the Neckar.

It has its source in the city's southwestern district of Vaihingen. After 12.8 kilometres, it discharges into the Neckar in the east of Stuttgart, opposite Bad Cannstatt.

Probably due to the protecting effect of its narrow vale, the development of the large city of Stuttgart was possible despite its otherwise disadvantageous topography.

From 1575 to 1874, water from the Glems river was deviated through a tunnel to the Nesenbach to ensure water supply in dry seasons.
