= Schmiebach =

River in Germany

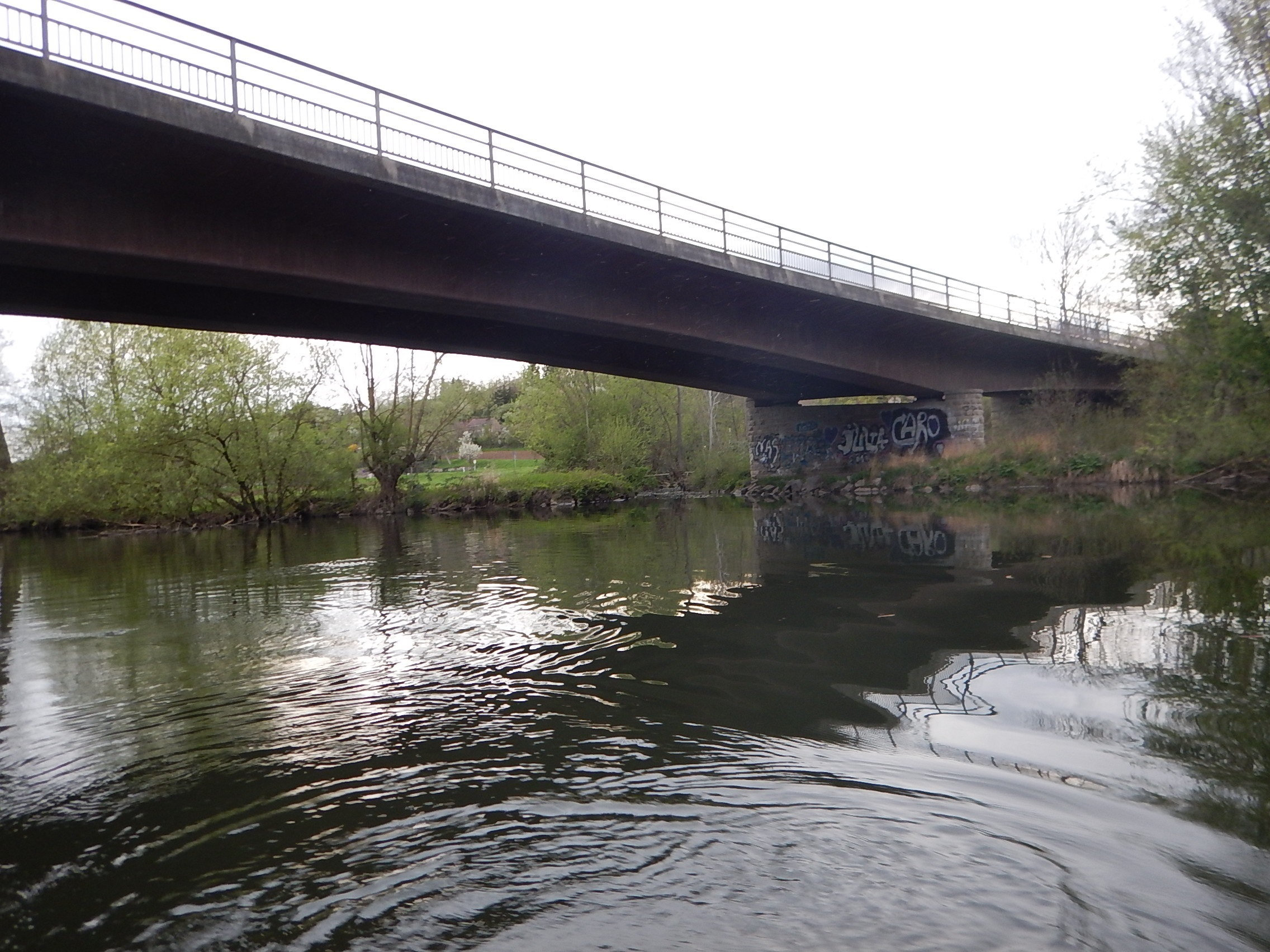

Location
- Country: Germany
- State: Baden-Württemberg

Physical characteristics
- Mouth
  - location: Enz
  - coordinates: 48.9365°N 8.9429°E
- Length: 12.2 km (7.6 mi)

Basin features
- Progression: Enz→ Neckar→ Rhine→ North Sea

The Schmiebach (also: Schmie) is a river of Baden-Württemberg, Germany. It flows into the Enz in Vaihingen an der Enz.

== See also ==
- List of rivers of Baden-Württemberg
