= Unterriexingen =

- Stadtteil of Markgröningen
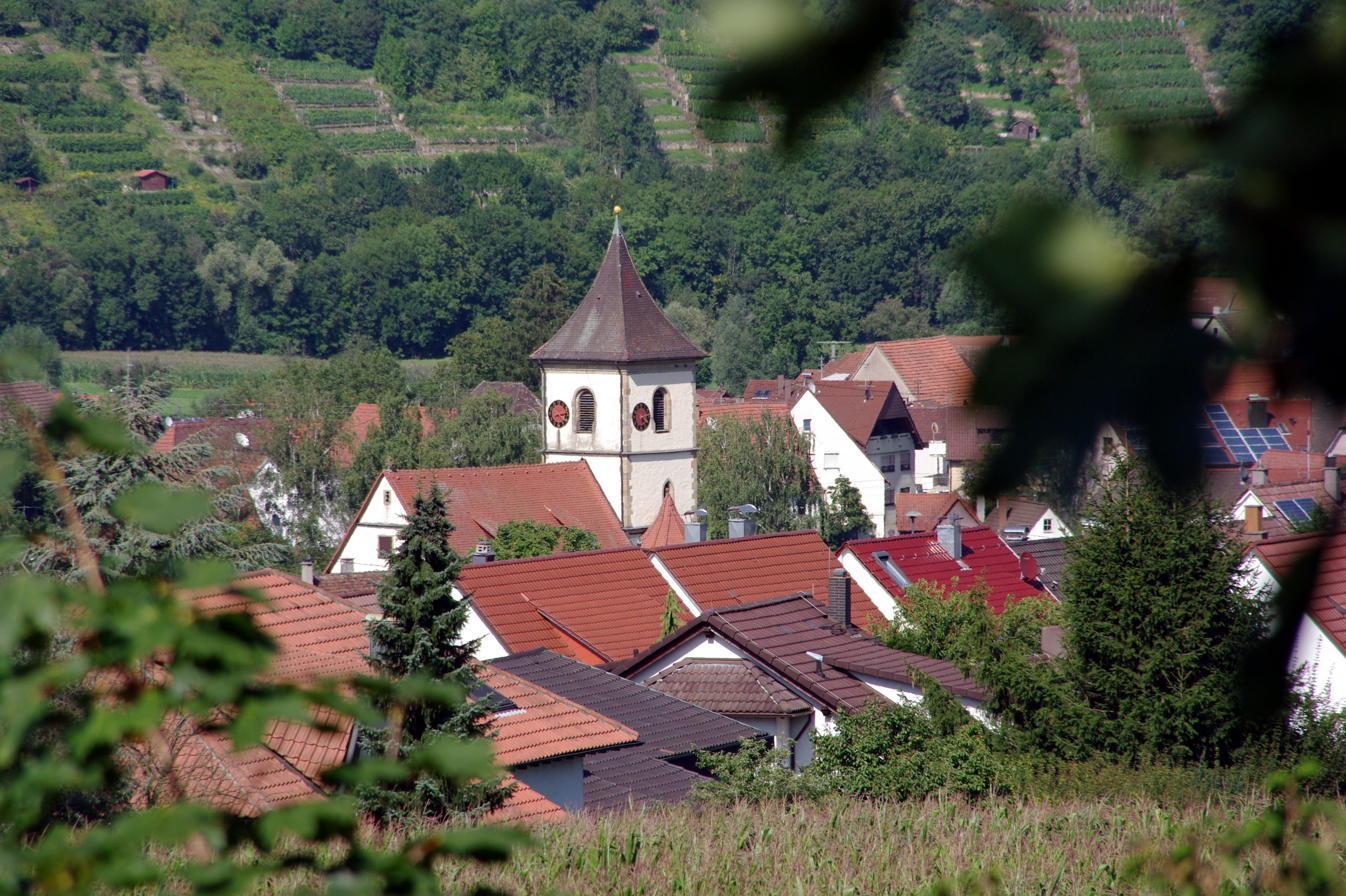
- View towards the center of Unterriexingen
- Interactive map of Unterriexingen
- Location within Germany Location within Baden-Württemberg
- Coordinates: 48°56′19″N 9°3′22″E
- Country: Germany
- State: Baden-Württemberg
- Admin. region: Stuttgart
- District: Ludwigsburg
- Town: Markgröningen

Area
  - Total: 7.29 km^{2} (2.81 sq mi)
- Elevation: 194 m (636 ft)

Population (2011)
  - Total: 2,320
  - Density: 318/km^{2} (824/sq mi)
- Time zone: UTC+01:00 (CET)
  - Summer (DST): UTC+02:00 (CEST)
- Postal codes: 71706
- Dialling codes: 07147
- Vehicle registration: LB

Unterriexingen is a village in the district of Ludwigsburg, Baden-Württemberg, Germany. By 1973 it was incorporated to the town of Markgröningen.

== Geography ==
=== Geology ===
Unterriexingen lies on a by the Glems split terrace of the Enz, which rises to the south and was covered by a glacial Loess layer.

=== Location and route network ===
The village lies on the northern edge of the Strohgäu about four kilometers north of Markgröningen. Through Unterriexingen flows the Glems. About 400 meters below the town the Glems opens in the Enz.

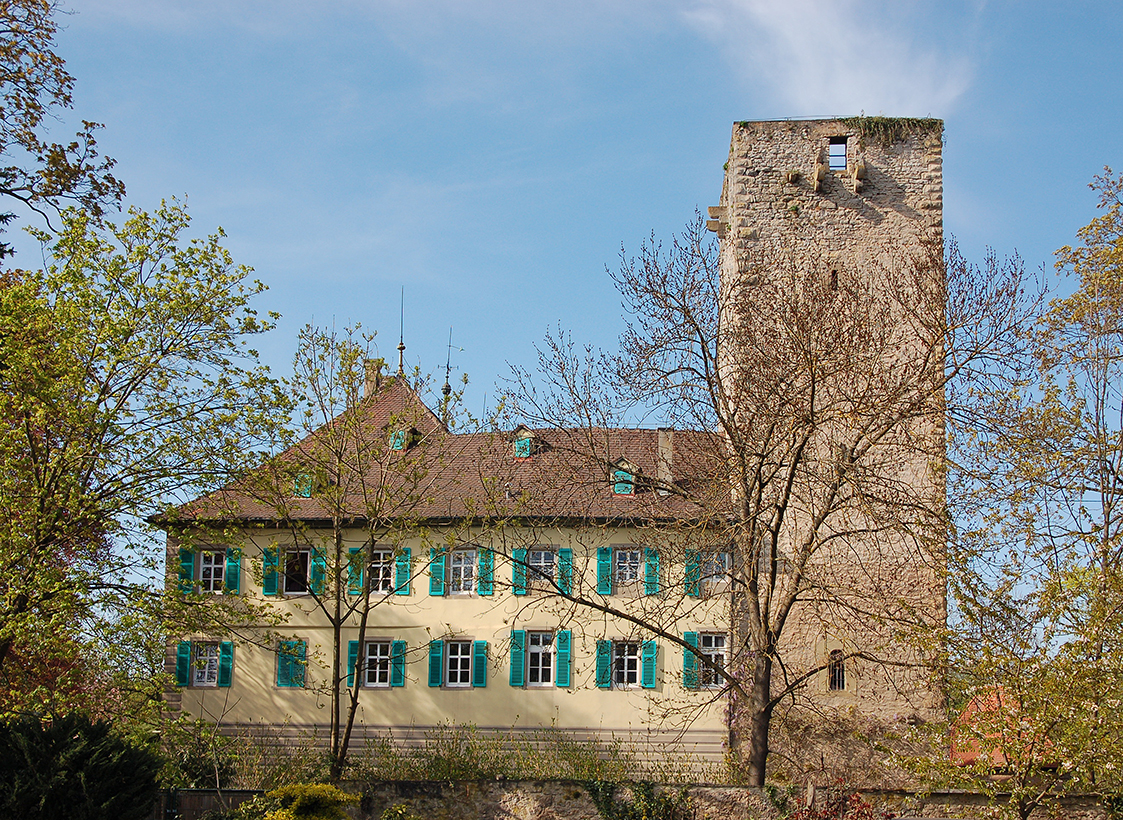
Castle Unterriexingen

=== Neighbouring ===
Around Unterriexingen are the settlements of Großsachsenheim, Untermberg, Markgröningen, Talhausen, Aichholzhof, Pulverdingen, Enzweihingen, Leinfelder Hof and Oberriexingen (from the north clockwise).

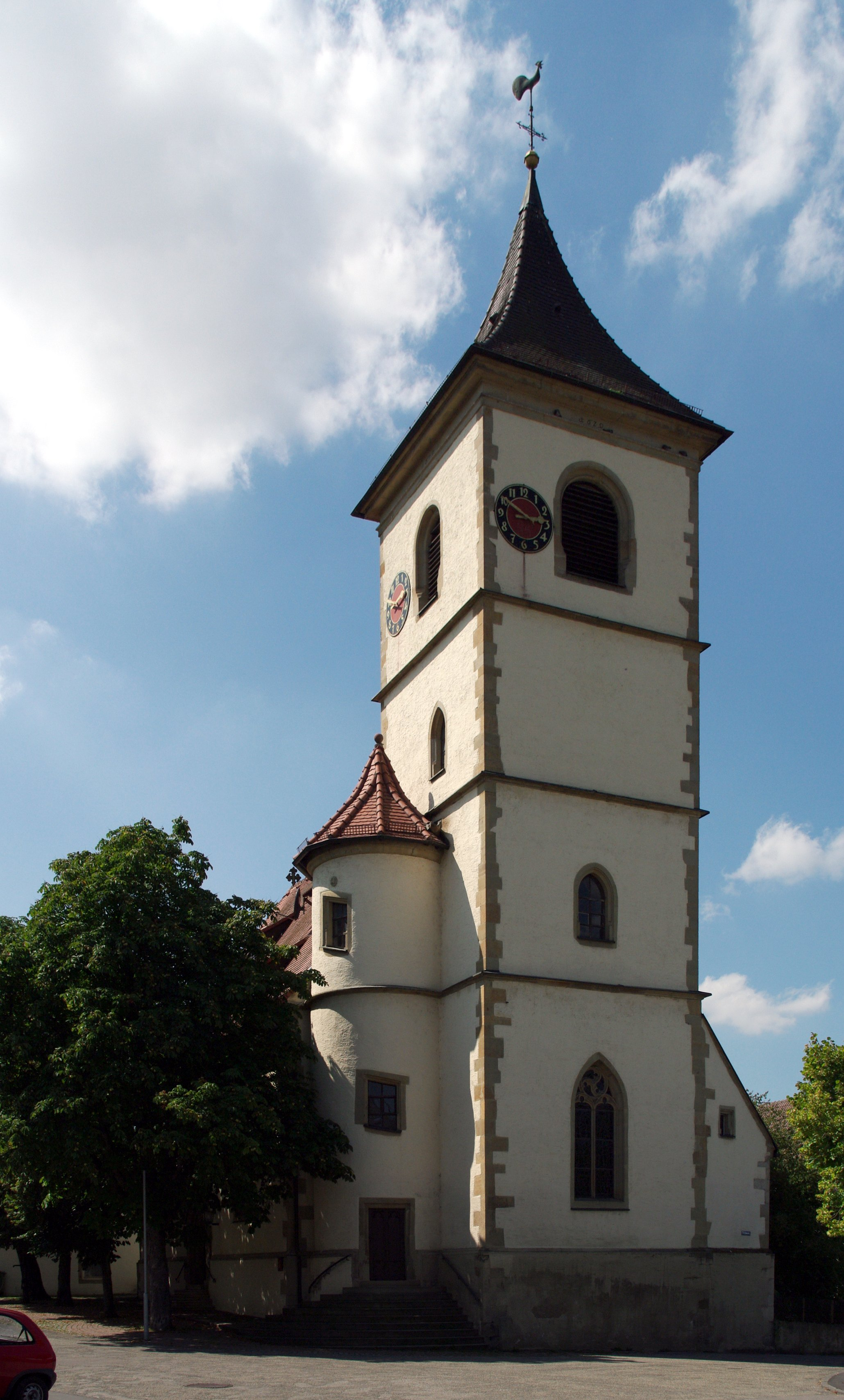
Evangelical church Unterriexingen

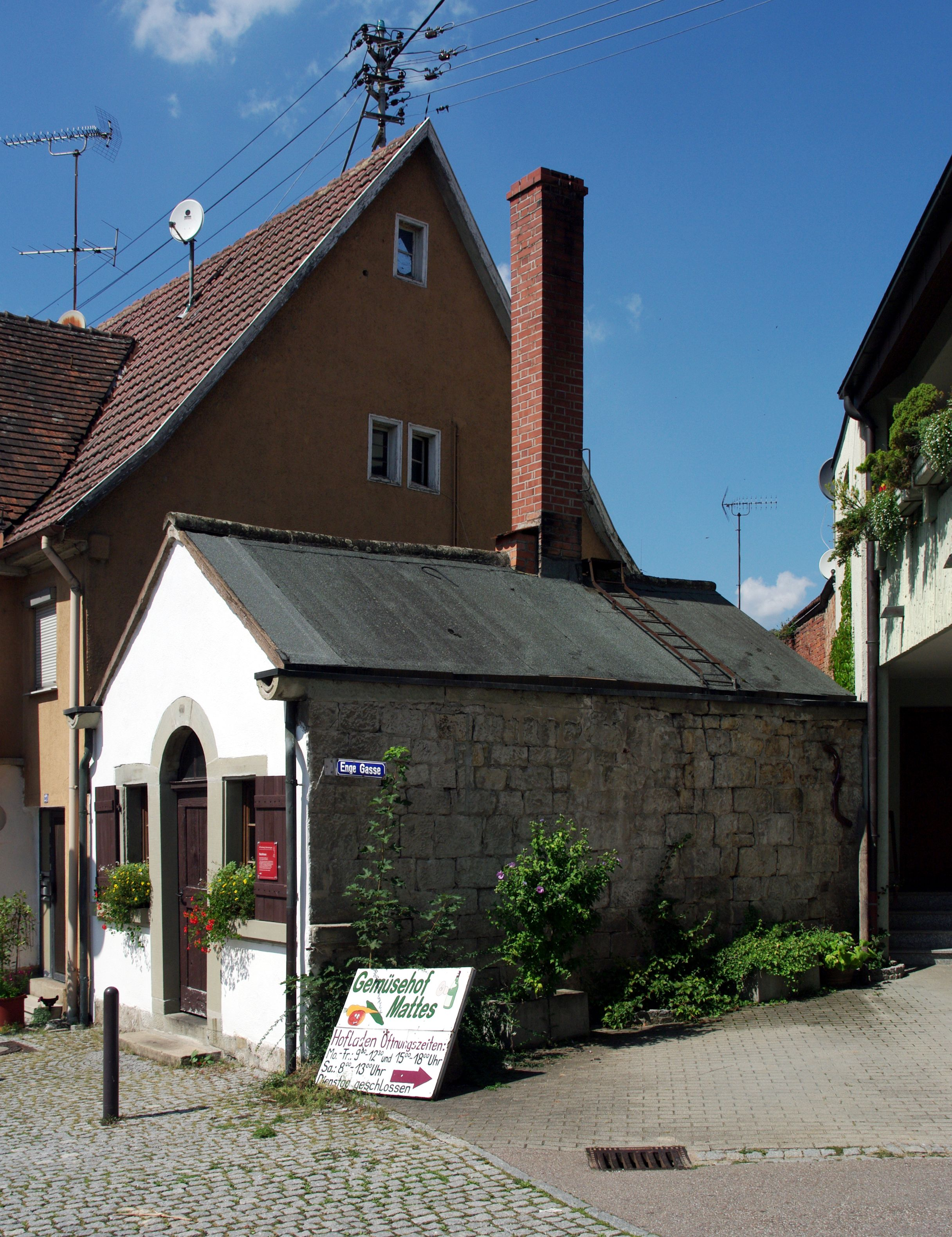
Bakehouse Unterriexingen

== Sons and daughters of the town ==
- August Ludwig Reyscher (born 1802 in the rectory; died in Cannstatt 1880), lawyer, legal scholars and politician (Landtag and Reichstag), 'the only honorary citizen' of Unterriexingen (appointment on 24 December 1842). He left a description of his youth in Unterriexingen
- Ulrich Noack (born 1956), lawyer and a professor at the University of Düsseldorf.
