= Metter (river) =

River in Germany

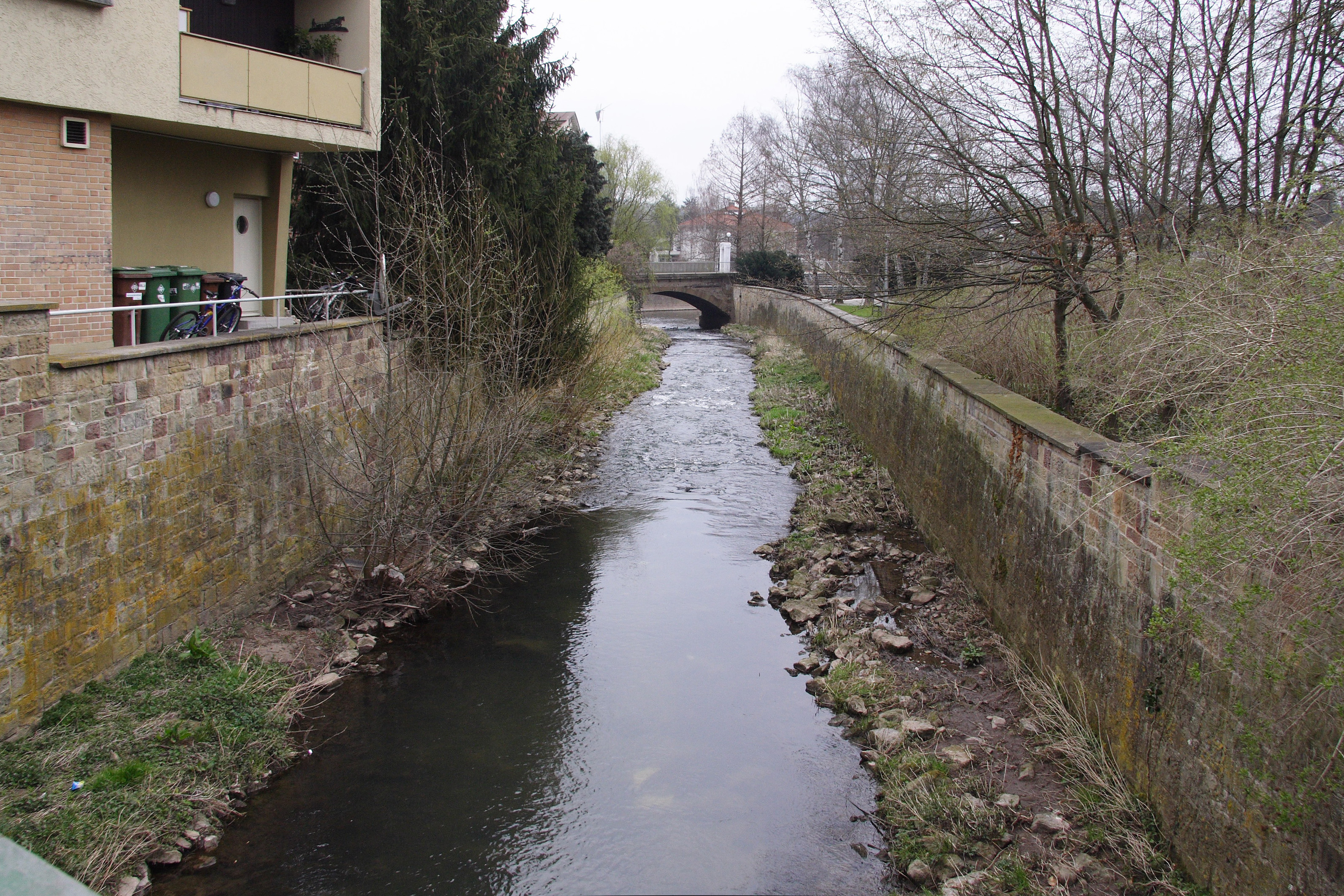

Location
- Country: Germany
- State: Baden-Württemberg

Physical characteristics
- Mouth
  - location: Enz
  - coordinates: 48.97°N 9.13°E
- Length: 28.3 km (17.6 mi)

Basin features
- Progression: Enz→ Neckar→ Rhine→ North Sea

The Metter (German pronunciation: [ˈmɛtɐ]) is a river of Baden-Württemberg, Germany. It flows into the Enz in Bietigheim-Bissingen.

== See also ==
- List of rivers of Baden-Württemberg
