= Glems =

River in Germany

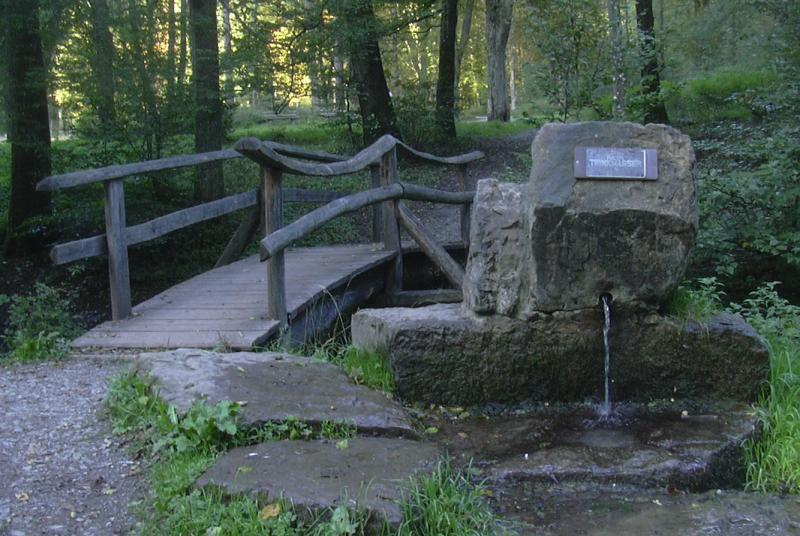
- The Glemsbrunnen - source of the river Glems

Location
- Country: Germany

Physical characteristics
- Source
  - location: Stuttgart
  - elevation: 440 m (1,440 ft)
- Mouth
  - location: Enz
  - coordinates: 48°56′26″N 9°3′12″E
  - elevation: 188 m (617 ft)
- Length: 47.0 km (29.2 mi)
- Basin size: 196 km^{2} (76 sq mi)

Basin features
- Progression: Enz→ Neckar→ Rhine→ North Sea

The river Glems (German pronunciation: [ɡlɛms]) is a right tributary of the river Enz in Baden-Württemberg, Germany. It is around 47 km (29 mi) long. The spring is located in the south-west of Stuttgart. On the way to the confluence into the Enz next to Unterriexingen (a quarter of Markgröningen) it passes the districts of Böblingen and Ludwigsburg.

The river Glems gives its name to a wooded mountain range called Glemswald in the Böblingen district of Stuttgart Region.

Since 1575, water from the upper Glems is collected in the Pfaffensee reservoir and redirected towards Stuttgart through a tunnel. First it was discharged in the Nesenbach, since 1874 into municipal waterworks.
