= Höfen an der Enz =

- Municipality
- Coat of arms

- Location of Höfen an der Enz within Calw district
- Interactive map of Höfen an der Enz
- Location within Germany Location within Baden-Württemberg
- Coordinates: 48°48′12″N 8°35′3″E
- Country: Germany
- State: Baden-Württemberg
- Admin. region: Karlsruhe
- District: Calw

Government
  - Mayor (2018–26): Heiko Stieringer

Area
  - Total: 9.07 km^{2} (3.50 sq mi)
- Elevation: 366 m (1,201 ft)

Population (2025-12-31)
  - Total: 1,669
  - Density: 184/km^{2} (477/sq mi)
- Time zone: UTC+01:00 (CET)
  - Summer (DST): UTC+02:00 (CEST)
- Postal codes: 75339
- Dialling codes: 07081
- Vehicle registration: CW
- Website: www.hoefen-enz.de

Höfen an der Enz (German pronunciation: [ˈhøːfn̩ ʔan deːɐ̯ ˈʔɛnts], lit. 'Höfen on the Enz') is a municipality in Calw district, in the region of Karlsruhe of Baden-Württemberg in Germany. Höfen is located on the River Enz at the northern edge of the Black Forest. It is located where street L 343 intersects with street B 294 (Gundelfingen - Bretten).

== Geography ==
Enztal is located in the northern Black Forest at an altitude of 360–712 meters, below the confluence of the big Enz and the small Enz. The community area is forested to 85%.

Höfen an der Enz

== History ==
The first recorded name of the place is "zum Hof" (locus dictus at zum hofe in a deed dated July 26, 1376), zu den Höfen. To Württemberg came Höfen together with Neuenbürg. Previously managed by a lawyer, the place became its own municipality administration unit (Schultheißenamt) and an independent municipality in the mid of the 19th century.

== Religions ==
Since the Reformation Höfen is Protestant coined; Roman Catholic believers are supervised by Bad Wildbad.

== Transportation ==
By the Enz Valley Railway (Pforzheim -Bad Wildbad), Höfen is today connected by the line S 6 of the Karlsruhe Stadtbahn to the national rail network. The town has two stops, "Höfen an der Enz" and "Höfen an der Enz Nord".

Höfen is situated on the road B294 (Bretten -Pforzheim- Freiburg), the nearest Autobahn is Pforzheim junction of the Bundesautobahn 8.

== Education ==
There is a primary school in Höfen. Older pupils are taught in the neighboring villages.
