= Enz =

River in Germany

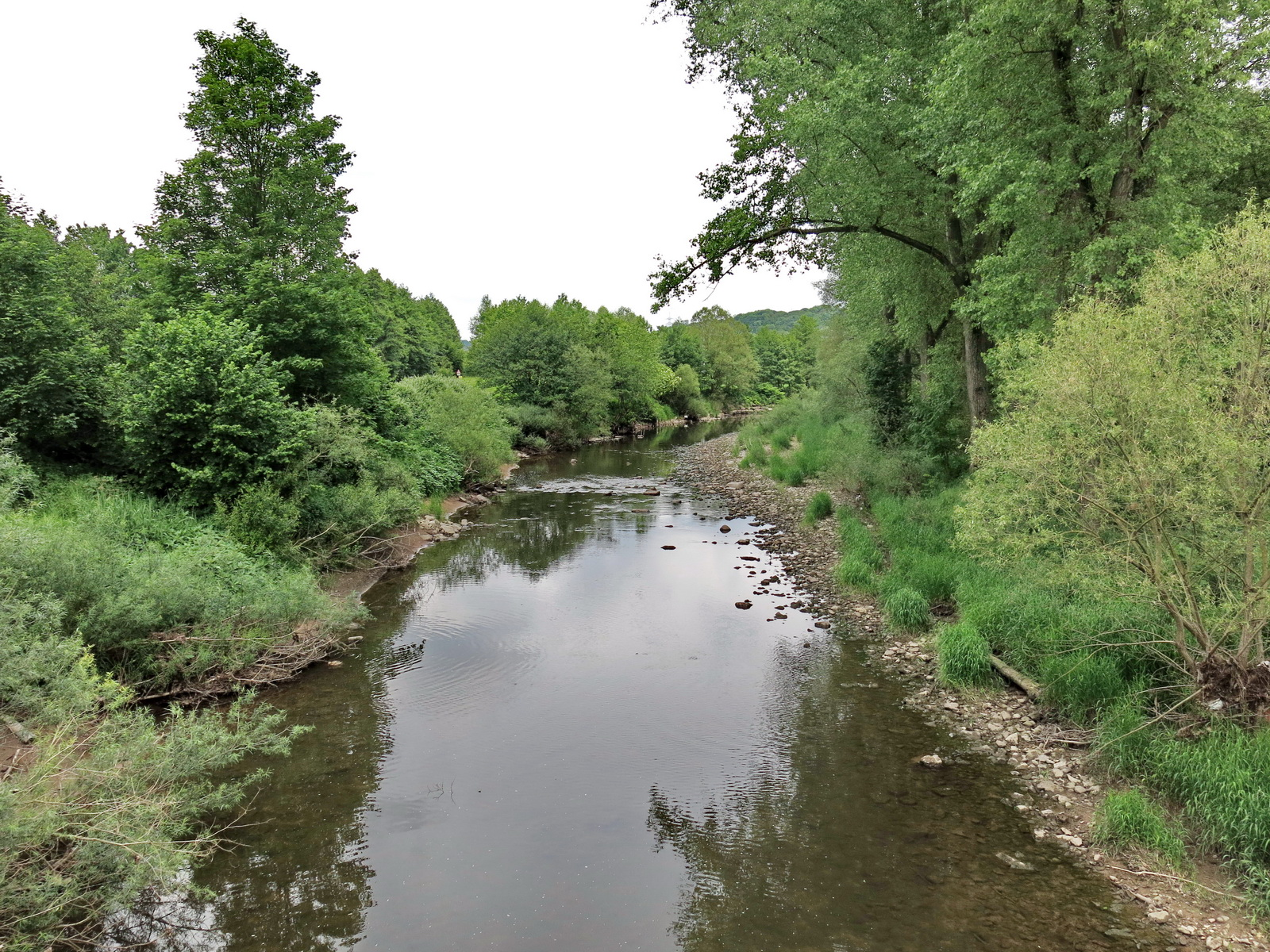
- The Enz in the nature reserve between Niefern and Mühlacker

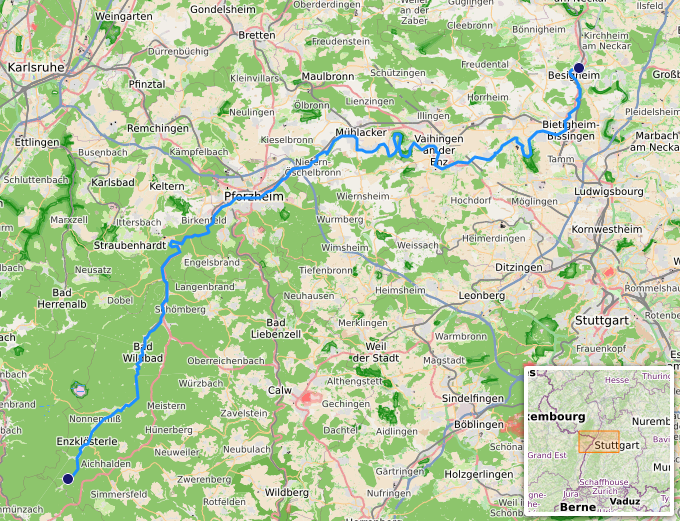

Location
- Country: Germany
- State: Baden-Württemberg

Physical characteristics
- Source
  - location: source of the Poppelbach in Besenfeld
  - coordinates: 48.609028°N 8.450278°E
- Mouth
  - location: Neckar in Besigheim
  - coordinates: 49°0′20″N 9°8′52″E
  - elevation: 170 m (560 ft)
- Length: 105.6 km (65.6 mi) (including Poppelbach)
- Basin size: 2,229 km^{2} (861 sq mi)

Basin features
- Progression: Neckar→ Rhine→ North Sea
- Tributaries
  - left: Rombach, Eyach, Schmiebach, Metter
  - right: Little Enz, Nagold, Strudelbach, Glems, Leudelsbach

The Enz (German pronunciation: [ɛnts]) is a river flowing north from the Black Forest to the Neckar in Baden-Württemberg. It is 106 km long.

Its headstreams – the Little Enz (German: Kleine Enz) and the Great Enz or Big Enz (Große Enz) – rise in the Northern Black Forest, the latter at Enzklösterle. In Calmbach, the Little Enz and the Big Enz join to form the Enz. The river passes through Neuenbürg and Pforzheim, where it leaves the Black Forest. It then flows through the cities of Vaihingen and Bietigheim-Bissingen. Along the lower course, wine is grown.

Major tributaries to the Enz are Glems and Nagold (with its tributary Würm). Near Besigheim, the Enz feeds into the Neckar.

In earlier times, the Enz was important for the timber rafting industry.

== Geography ==
=== River system ===
The Enz flows through two large natural regions: in the upper half of its course, the river and its tributaries drain the eastern half of the Northern Black Forest; later it flows through the southwest German Gäu landscape, mostly through the Neckar Basin.

Including its main headstream, the Poppelbach, the Enz has a total length of about 105 kilometres. However, unusually, its right tributary, the Nagold, which discharges into the Enz in Pforzheim on emerging from the Black Forest, is longer - in fact almost twice as long as its own headstream to that point. In addition, the Nagold carries twice as much water at its mouth. Thus, above Pforzheim, the Nagold is hydrographically the main branch of the river system of the Enz, which is then about 149 kilometres long, and thus the third longest of the Neckar tributaries after the river systems of the Kocher and the Jagst.

=== Headstreams ===
The Enz bears its name without any qualifier until it reaches the town of Calmbach, where the Great Enz (Große Enz) and Little Enz (Kleine Enz) merge. The Great Enz has two headstreams, both approximately 5 kilometres long: the Poppelbach and the Kaltenbach, which unite at Gompelscheuer. As with the source of the Danube in Donaueschingen, this purely nominal beginning of the (Great) Enz is symbolized by the nearby Enz Spring (Enzbrunnen) and, likewise, has been erroneously marketed as such to tourists.

In terms of water quantity and size of catchment area, the Poppelbach, which flows from the south, is the main headstream, whilst the Kaltenbach, which flows from the west, has a slightly greater length and higher source. The Poppelbach rises to the south, only 1 km north of the source of the River Nagold at 822 m (in the parish of Besenfeld); the Kaltenbach rises to the northwest, on the southern slopes of the Schramberg at 907 m (in the parish of Forbach in the Murg valley).

=== Great Enz and upper reaches in the Black Forest ===
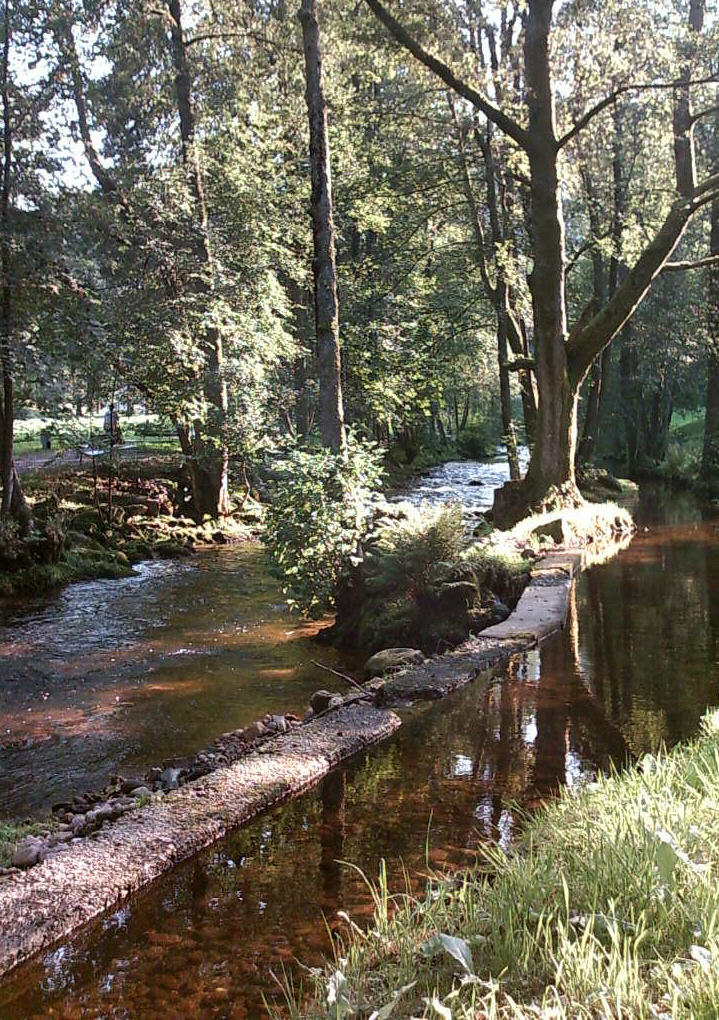
The Great Enz in the spa park of Bad Wildbad

From the confluence of the Poppelbach and Kaltenbach, the Great Enz initially flows through a narrow wooded valley that, after a small change in gradient, opens into the much broader valley of the Rombach, joining from the west. The valleys of the Enz, Rombach and other western tributaries of the upper reaches are characterised by glacial cirques from the last ice age. After the Enz valley widens at Enzklösterle it narrows again until it reaches the next glacial valley, the Kegeltal, at Sprollenhaus. Having hitherto flowed northeast, the Great Enz swings northwards and flows through a steep valley that cuts across the mostly wooded bunter sandstone plateaux of the northern Black Forest. From the well-known Old Württemberg resort of Wildbad, the valley is densely populated. At Calmbach, where the Little Enz empties into the main river, follow the settlements of Höfen an der Enz and Neuenbürg. Here the Enz makes a wide loop enclosing a mountain spur atop which is Neuenbürg Castle. The Black Forest valley of the Enz has, including the valley of the Great Enz from Gompelscheuer, a length of approximately 38 kilometres and ends as it enters the Kraichgau region at Birkenfeld above Pforzheim.

=== Enz valley in the Gäu and Neckar Basin ===
After emerging from the Black Forest, the Enz flows down to its mouth in the Neckar Gäu country in the muschelkalk beds of the South German Scarplands. From a natural regional perspective, the Enz valley between Birkenfeld and Enzberg is counted as part of the Kraichgau, which continues to the north, further downstream it is part of the Neckar Basin between Stuttgart and Heilbronn.

=== Overview of the tributaries ===
Tributaries from the confluence of the Little (Kleine) and Great (Große) Enz. Tributary lengths are based on the source furthest from the mouth.

- Kleine Enz, from the right in Calmbach, 20 km and 88 km^{2}.
- Förtelbach, from the right in Höfen an der Enz.
- Eyach, from the left between Höfen an der Enz and Neuenbürg, 18.5 km and 52.6 km^{2}.
- Rotenbach, from the left in hamlet of Rotenbach near Neuenbürg.
- Größelbach, from the right between Neuenbürg and Birkenfeld.
- Tiefenbach, from the left in Birkenfeld.
- Nagold, from the right in Pforzheim, 90.4 km and 1,151 km^{2}.
- Mäuerachklinge, from the right im Pforzheim village of Mäuerach.
- Igelsbach, from the left between Eutingen and Niefern.
- Schlupfgraben, from the left in Enzberg
- Erlenbach, from the left in Mühlacker, 11.1 km.
- Schmie, from the left near Vaihingen, 12.1 km and 47.4 km^{2}.
- Strudelbach, from the right near Enzweihingen, 15 km and 55 km^{2}.
- Dürre Enz, from the left in Oberriexingen.
- Glems, from the right near Unterriexingen, 47.2 km.
- Leudelsbach, from the right between Unterriexingen and Untermberg, 6.5 km and 22.7 km^{2}.
- Saubach, from the right in Bissingen.
- Metter, from the left in Bietigheim, 28 km.
- Steinbach, from the left in Besigheim.

=== Political geography ===
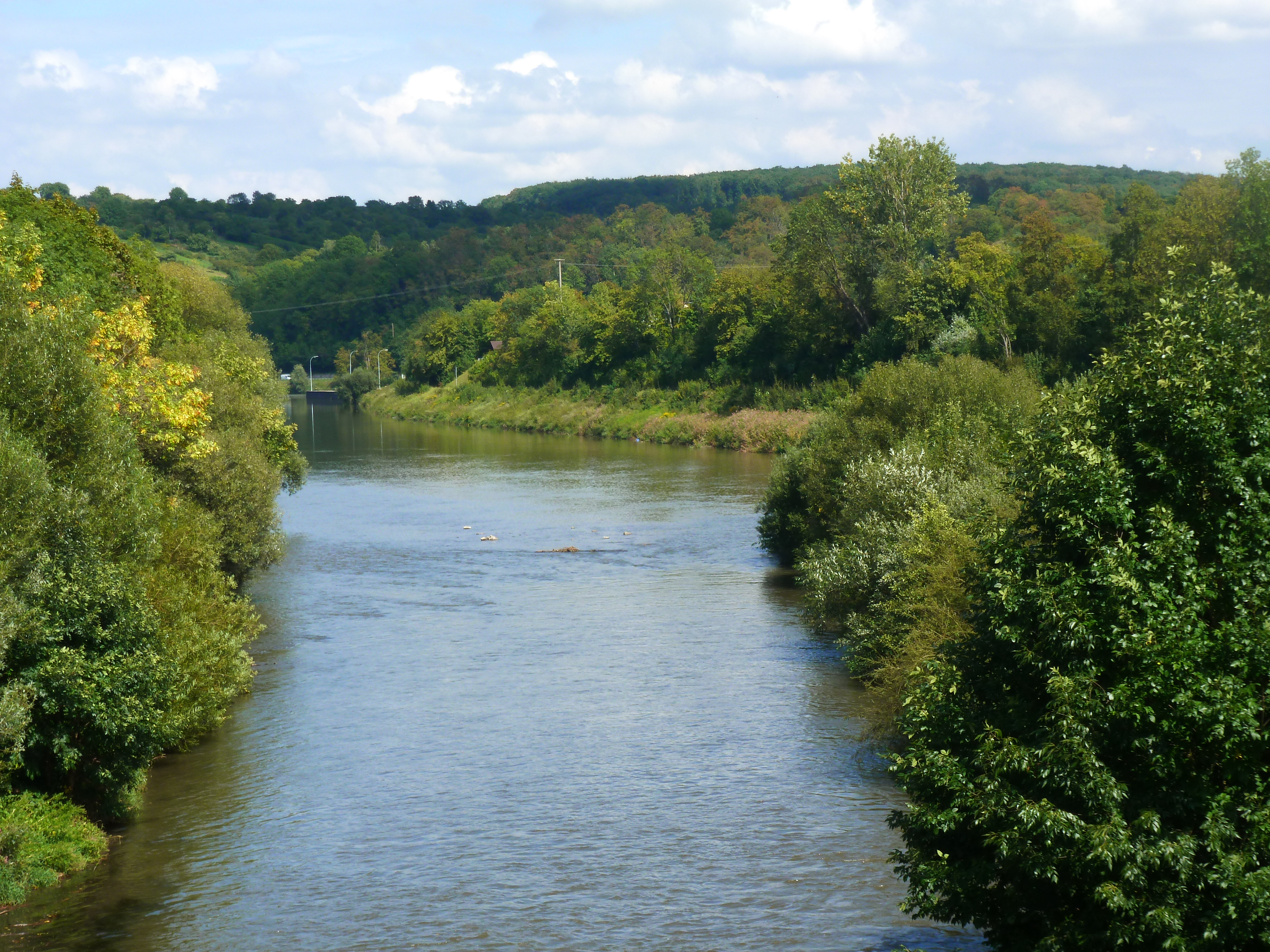
The Enz (foreground) empties into the Neckar.

The Enz flows mainly through the counties of Calw, Enzkreis, Pforzheim and Ludwigsburg. Some headwaters of tributaries of the Great Enz and the headwaters of the Kaltenbach flow partly through Rastatt.

Until the great territorial upheavals around 1803 and 1806, the course of the Enz ran mainly through the territory of Old Württemberg, with short sections in the Old Baden or through knightly estates. Wildbad, Neuenbürg, Vaihingen, Bietigheim and Besigheim were Old Württemberg centres of administration. The current territory of the counties of Rastatt and the Enz around Pforzheim (parishes of Brötzingen, Pforzheim, Eutingen and Niefern) belonged to Baden. In Oberriexingen, sovereignty was divided between imperial knights and Württemberg.

== Environment and economy ==
=== Flora and fauna ===
The lower reaches of the Enz, with their typical water meadow shore structures, are an ideal habitat for many riparian plant and animal species. Many of the oxbow lakes and riparian woodlands are protected habitats; the Enz itself and parts of the valley such as the nature reserve near Vaihingen-Roßwag and the mouth of the Leudelsbach at Unterriexingen are part of the Europe-wide protected network of nature protection areas known as Natura 2000.

In the shallow waters up to 10,000 larvae - of mayflies, caddis flies, dragonflies, beetles, snails and mussels - have been counted. Even Western vairone, barbel, nase and bullhead have their spawning grounds here.

From early summer, the Enz is home to dense communities of river water crowfoot and watermilfoil.

Some rare and endangered species live all year round on the Enz, which is an important resting stop for many migratory birds. These include, inter alia, kingfisher, sandpiper, goosander, grey wagtail, moorhen and dipper. Other guests and residents of the coppiced willows and the trees lining the banks of the river are white wagtail, Icterine warbler, spotted flycatcher, nightingale and golden oriole.

=== Economy ===
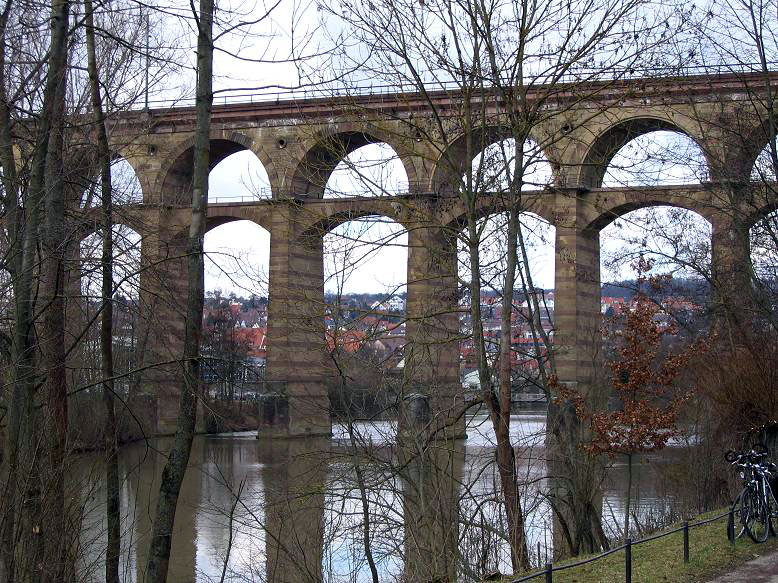
Railway viaduct over the Enz near Bietigheim-Bissingen

Until the early 20th century, timber rafting was an important branch of the economy in the Black Forest. Like its neighbouring rivers, the Murg and Nagold, the Enz was used for transporting tree trunks and, especially, logs. Schwallungen (storage ponds that were drained for rafting), such as the Poppelsee and Kaltenbachsee at Gompelscheuer, recall this activity. In the Black Forest section of the Enz valley today, forest products and tourism dominate the economy.

In the muschelkalk area of the river, agriculture has a certain significance, and viticulture is practised on steep, terraced vineyards of the Enz valley. Industry and service are concentrated in Pforzheim (jewellery, precious metals, watches, commercial and administration), but can also be found in smaller centres in the catchment area of Stuttgart (especially Bietigheim-Bissingen).

Since the 5th century; B.C. (the early La Tène period) iron ore mining has been carried out in the Enz region. The visitor mine of Frischglück Pit is an example of an individual mine.

== Water sports ==
The upper reaches of the Enz are mainly used by white water canoeists. The most famous section is the challenging Kurparkstrecke in Bad Wildbad.

Water sports are restricted on some sections of the river in order to protect the ecosystem:

- Enzkreis: traffic lights on the weir at Mühlhausen: no boating on the mill's loop when there is a red light
- Ludwigsburg county: Enter from the riverbank and landing stages only at the marked entry and exit points. Keep off pebble islands and shoals; no camping, barbecues or fires on the waterfront, except at signed and equipped places.
  1 May to 30 September 30: Roßwag (river km 34.12) closed as far as the Vaihingen Seemühle (km 29.94)
  Same period, but to Bietigheim-Bissingen Sawmill (km 13.16): at water levels below 65 cm (Vaihingen Gauge) Boating only with trained guide; prohibited at levels less than 45 cm.

== Literature ==
- Max Scheifele: Als die Wälder auf Reisen gingen. Flößerei im Enz-Nagold-Gebiet. Verlag G. Braun, Karlsruhe, 1996, ISBN 3-7650-8164-7.
