= Ostweg =

North-south long-distance path through the Black Forest

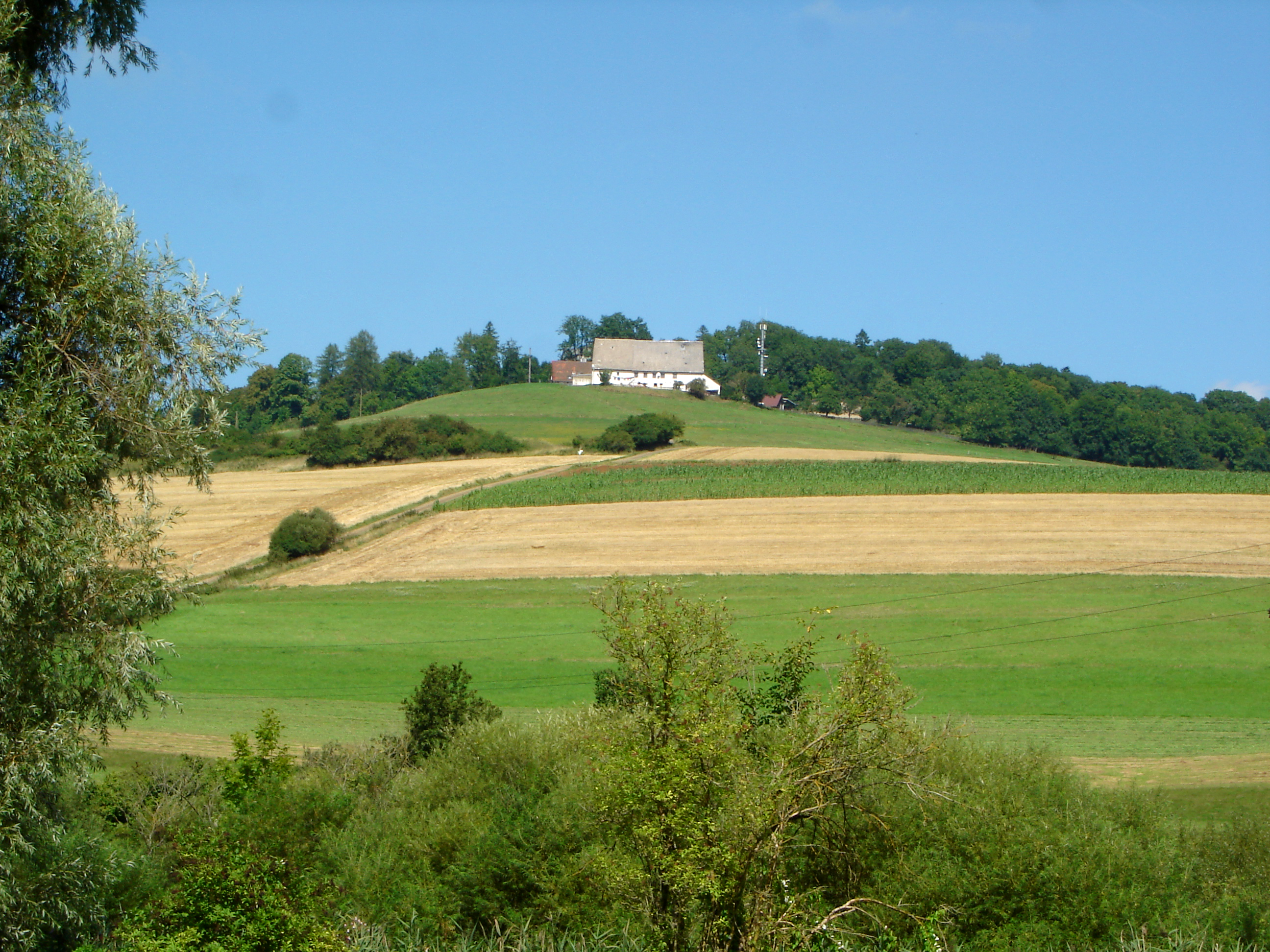
- Wartenberg
- Length: c. 240 km
- Location: Germany, Baden-Württemberg, Black Forest
- Trailheads: Pforzheim; Schaffhausen
- Use: long distance path
- Elevation change: 648 m
- Highest point: near Hondingen (921 m)
- Lowest point: Pforzheim (273 m)
- Difficulty: easy
- Season: spring to autumn
- Waymark: black and red vertically divided diamond on a white background
- Sights: Zavelstein Castle, Wanne, Randen
- Maintained by: Black Forest Club

The Ostweg is a north-south long-distance path through the Black Forest from Pforzheim to Schaffhausen. The roughly 240-kilometre-long ridgeway was laid out in 1903 and has been managed and maintained since then by the Black Forest Club. Its waymark is a black and red diamond on a white background.

== Day tours/stages ==
=== First stage: Pforzheim – Bad Liebenzell ===
==== Overview ====
- Distance: 25 km
- Journey time: c. 6 hours

| Place/Attraction | Route (km) | Höhe (m ü. NHN) | Further information |
|---|---|---|---|
| Pforzheim-Kupferhammer | 0 | 254 | Starting point of the three Black Forest ridgeways: the Westweg (Pforzheim – Basel), Mittelweg (Pforzheim – Waldshut) and Ostweg (Pforzheim – Schaffhausen) |
| Pforzheim-Würm | 4.0 | 327 | |
| Liebeneck Castle | 3.0 | 340 | |
| Hamberg | 4.0 | 484 | In the municipality of Neuhausen |
| Steinegg Castle | 1.5 | 391 | |
| Neuhausen | 4.5 | 482 | |
| Monbachbrückle | 1.5 | 450 | Entry to the Monbach valley |
| Bad Liebenzell | 6.5 | 333 | |

==== Route description ====
The starting point is the Kupferhammer south of Pforzheim. The path runs initially parallel to the road into the Würm valley and then climbs up to the right through the Pforzheim district of Würm and back down to the valley again. At a forest car park the path crosses a wooden bridge and continues to the ruins of Liebeneck. Carrying on up the Würm valley it reaches Hamberg, leaving it on the Schlossstraße. After a chapel it runs past the ruins of Steinegg to Neuhausen. Next the walk crosses the little bridge of Monbachbrückle into the Monbach valley. The Monbach empties into the River Nagold. At their confluence the path turns right and runs parallel to the railway line to Bad Liebenzell.

=== Second stage: Bad Liebenzell – Oberhaugstett ===
==== Overview ====
- Distance: 21 km
- Journey time: c. 5 hours

| Place/Attraction | Route (km) | Höhe (m ü. NHN) | Further information |
|---|---|---|---|
| Bad Liebenzell | 0 | 333 | |
| Wolfsschlucht | 3.0 | 380 | near Ernstmühl |
| Hirsau | 2.0 | 341 | In the municipality of Calw; Abbey Ruins of |
| Calw | 3.5 | 347 | |
| Zavelstein | 6.0 | 585 | In the municipality of Bad Teinach-Zavelstein Castle ruins and viewing tower |
| Bad Teinach | 1.0 | 391 | In the municipality of Bad Teinach-Zavelstein |
| Liebelsberg | 3.0 | 614 | In the municipality of Neubulach |
| Oberhaugstett | 2.5 | 569 | In the municipality of Neubulach |

==== Route description ====
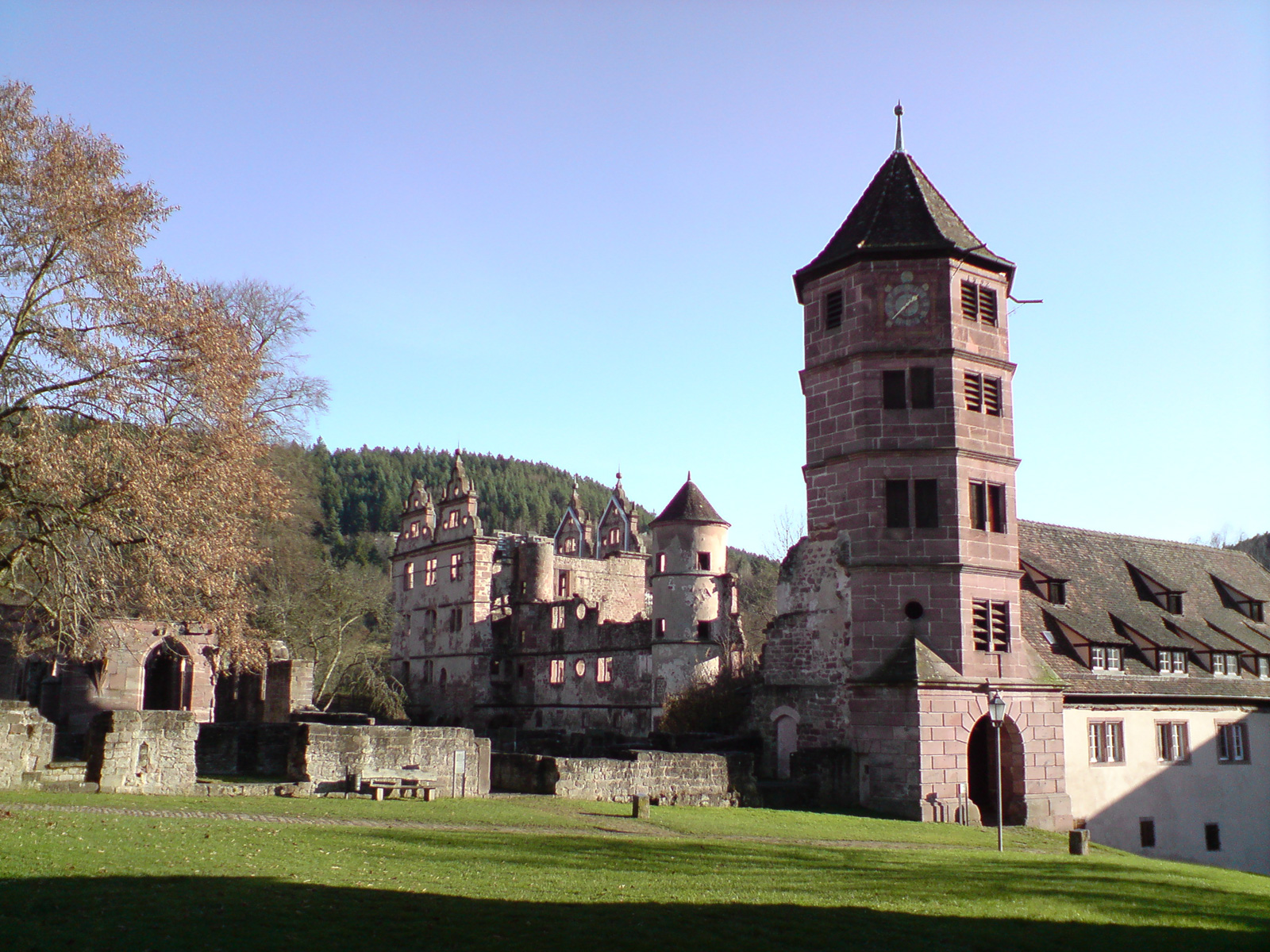
Ruins of Hirsau Abbey

After leaving the outskirts of Bad Liebenzell the path leads to the Wolfsschlucht gorge near Ernstmühl and then to the village of Hirsau with its ruined abbey dating to the 11th century. Calw itself is then reached via the Hirsauer Wiesenweg. Along Inselgasse and Lederstraße the path continues via the market place (Marktplatz) and Salzgasse out of the town to the rock massif of Gimbelstein and on to the Zavelstein Hostel which lies next to the Zavelsteiner Krokuswiesen Nature Reserve, In Zavelstein the route continues along Staufer Straße and Krokusstraße to the castle. Then the walk descends steeply to Bad Teinach. At the church the path turns right into Badstraße, goes past the Kurhaus and through the spa grounds uphill to Liebelsberg. Just before the village there is a water tower, which is also used as a viewing tower. From Liebelsberg a tarmac path leads to Oberhaugstett, which is reached along the road called Am Schleifberg.

=== Third stage: Oberhaugstett – Pfalzgrafenweiler ===
==== Overview ====
- Distance: 22 km
- Journey time: c. 5.5 hours

| Place/Attraction | Route (km) | Höhe (m ü. NHN) | Further information |
|---|---|---|---|
| Oberhaugstett | 0 | 569 | |
| Buhlerwaldstern | 4.0 | 618 | |
| Wart | 1.5 | 600 | In the municipality of Altensteig |
| Berneck | 3.5 | 455 | In the municipality of Altensteig |
| Altensteigdorf | 1.5 | 558 | In the municipality of Altensteig |
| Altensteig | 1.5 | 444 | |
| Kohlsägmühle | 3.5 | 470 | |
| Zinsbachmühle | 3.5 | 530 | |
| Büchelesbrunnen | 1.0 | 630 | |
| Pfalzgrafenweiler | 2.0 | 636 | Intersection with the Gäurandweg |

==== Route description ====
We leave Oberhaugstett on Martinsmooser Straße; the path goes past the watchtower (Wart) to the castle and village of Berneck. Other destinations are Altensteigdorf, Altensteig, the Kohlsägmühle mill, the Zinsbachmühle mill and the end of the stage at Pfalzgrafenweiler.

=== Fourth stage: Pfalzgrafenweiler – Freudenstadt ===
==== Overview ====
- Distance: 18.5 km
- Journey time: c. 4.5 hours

| Place/Attraction | Route (km) | Höhe (m ü. NHN) | Further information |
|---|---|---|---|
| Pfalzgrafenweiler | 0 | 636 | |
| Russenbusch | 0.5 | 650 | |
| Findelhütte | 3.0 | 659 | |
| Fuchstrieb | 1.0 | 713 | |
| Hausers Heuscheuer | 1.5 | 693 | |
| Beim Glattbächle | 0.5 | 695 | |
| Obermusbach | 2.0 | 660 | In the municipality of Freudenstadt |
| Untermusbach | 1.5 | 680 | In the municipality of Freudenstadt |
| Tal des Aunbachs | 1.0 | 632 | In the municipality of Freudenstadt |
| Frutenhof | 1.0 | 670 | In the municipality of Freudenstadt |
| Haldenberg | 2.5 | 670 | Sportplatz Wittlensweiler |
| Freudenstadt | 2.5 | 728 | Joins the Mittelweg from Pforzheim–Waldshut |

==== Route description ====
We leave Pfalzgrafenweiler on Christoph-Decker-Straße. After 9 kilometres the path reaches Obermusbach. There the walk continues along Kälberbronner Straße, Klosterstraße and Mühlhaldenstraße to Untermusbach. Here it continues along Mühlhaldenstraße, past the sports field, along Merzenbergstraße and Müllerstraße out of the village. Passing Frutenhof and Wittlensweiler it leads to Freudenstadt. In the town the route passes the cemetery and reaches the railway station. It then goes along Musbacher Straße and Stuttgarter Straße to the market place (Marktplatz).

=== Fifth stage: Freudenstadt – Alpirsbach ===
==== Overview ====
- Distance: 21.5 km
- Journey time: c. 5 hours

| Place/Attraction | Route (km) | Höhe (m ü. NHN) | Further information |
|---|---|---|---|
| Freudenstadt | 0 | 728 | |
| Friedrichsturm / Kienberg | 1.5 | 799 | |
| Kohlberg | 4.5 | 730 | |
| Vogteiturm | 1.0 | 740 | viewing tower |
| Sandwiese | 1.0 | 752 | |
| Adrionshof | 1.0 | 724 | |
| Schömberg | 3.5 | 744 | In the municipality of Loßburg |
| Alpirsbach | 9.0 | 441 | End point of the Querwegs Gengenbach–Alpirsbach |

==== Route description ====
After the market place the route continues through Freudenstadt along Loßburger Straße, Straßburger Straße, Lauterbadstraße, Friedrich-Ebert-Straße and Herzog-Friedrich-Straße to the Friedrichsturm tower on the Kienberg. The route then runs past the Vogtei Tower to the Adrionshof and on to Ödenwald. About 2 kilometres further on it reaches a large forest clearing. It continues along the edge of the wood and the road to Schömberg, leaving via Reinerzauerstraße and Altenburgstraße. After 2 kilometres the route leaves the track in the forest district of Hardt and follows a narrow footpath. After the Heilenberger Hut it continues, in places very steeply, down to Alpirsbach, which is reached via Forchenweg.

=== Sixth stage: Alpirsbach – Schramberg ===
==== Overview ====
- Distance: 19 km
- Journey time: c. 5.5 hours

| Place/Attraction | Route (km) | Höhe (m ü. NHN) | Further information |
|---|---|---|---|
| Alpirsbach | 0 | 441 | |
| Rötenbach | 1.5 | 420 | In the municipality of Alpirsbach |
| Adelsberg | 1.0 | 518 | |
| Fräulinsberg | 2.0 | 530 | |
| Holzebene | 3.0 | 583 | Naturfreundehaus |
| Brandsteig-Schänzle | 1.5 | 690 | Römische Straßenstation |
| Zollhaus | 1.5 | 720 | |
| Aichhalden | 2.5 | 716 | |
| Paradieshof | 3.5 | 670 | |
| Schramberg | 2.5 | 424 | |

=== Seventh stage: Schramberg – Villingen ===
==== Overview ====
- Distance: 27.5 km
- Journey time: c. 7 hours

| Place/Attraction | Route (km) | Höhe (m ü. NHN) | Further information |
|---|---|---|---|
| Schramberg | 0 | 424 | |
| Tischneck | 2.5 | 720 | In the municipality of Schramberg |
| Benediktinerhöhe | 1.0 | 798 | |
| Hardt | 1.5 | 800 | |
| Mönchhof | 2.0 | 794 | |
| Lindenloch / Glasbachtal | 2.0 | 760 | |
| Albblick / Martinsweiler | 1.5 | 770 | Kreuzung mit dem Querweg Rottweil–Lahr |
| Ruine Waldau | 1.5 | 737 | Kulturdenkmal Hof Beck |
| Königsfeld | 2.0 | 761 | Kreuzung mit Querweg Rottweil–Lahr |
| Mönchweiler | 5.5 | 801 | |
| Kurgarten Villingen | 5.5 | 721 | Kreuzung mit dem Black Forest-Jura-Bodensee-Weg |
| Villingen | 2.5 | 704 | |

=== Eighth stage: Villingen – Sunthausen ===
==== Overview ====
- Distance: 16.5 km
- Journey time: c. 4 hours

| Place/Attraction | Route (km) | Höhe (m ü. NHN) | Further information |
|---|---|---|---|
| Villingen | 0 | 704 | |
| viewing tower Wanne | 2.5 | 777 | |
| Bertholdshöfe | 1.0 | 758 | Intersection with the Black Forest Jura-Bodensee-Weg |
| Hölzlekönig | 1.0 | 748 | Ehemaliges Naturdenkmal |
| Kugelmoos | 2.5 | 710 | |
| Schwenninger Moos | 1.0 | 706 | Naturschutzgebiet |
| Bad Dürrheim-Kurhaus Hüttenbühl | 2.0 | 700 | |
| Waldcafé | 2.0 | 795 | Aussichtspunkt |
| Hirschhaldehütte | 2.0 | 759 | Kleine Schutzhütte |
| Sunthauser See | 2.0 | 707 | |
| Sunthausen | 0.5 | 706 | In the municipality of Bad Dürrheim |

=== Ninth stage: Sunthausen – Geisingen ===
==== Overview ====
- Distance: 16 km
- Journey time: c. 4 hours

| Place/Attraction | Route (km) | Höhe (m ü. NHN) | Further information |
|---|---|---|---|
| Sunthausen | 0 | 706 | |
| Öfingen | 5.0 | 820 | In the municipality of Bad Dürrheim; Intersection with the Black Forest Jura-Bodensee-Weg |
| Blatthaldenhütte | 5.0 | 915 | Schutzhütte mit Grillplatz; Aussichtspunkt |
| Hörnlekapf | 1.5 | 875 | Hubertushütte; Aussichtspunkt |
| Geisingen | 4.5 | 667 | |

=== Tenth stage: Geisingen – Achdorf ===
==== Overview ====
- Distance: 23 km
- Journey time: c. 6 hours

| Place/Attraction | Route (km) | Höhe (m ü. NHN) | Further information |
|---|---|---|---|
| Geisingen | 0 | 667 | |
| Wartenberg | 2.0 | 825 | |
| Gutmadingen | 2.5 | 673 | In the municipality of Geisingen |
| Wendthütte | 3.0 | 859 | Grillplatz |
| Längewiesen | 1.5 | 914 | |
| Wegabzweigung nach Hondingen | 0.5 | 921 | Höchster Punkt des Ostwegs |
| Neue Hütte | 1.5 | 835 | |
| Hondingen | 1.5 | 720 | In the municipality of Blumberg |
| Eichberg | 6.0 | 913 | Schutzhütte; Aussichtspunkt |
| Achdorf | 4.5 | 540 | In the municipality of Blumberg |

=== Eleventh stage: Achdorf – Stühlingen ===
==== Overview ====
- Distance: 16.5 km
- Journey time: c. 4.5 hours

| Place/Attraction | Route (km) | Höhe (m ü. NHN) | Further information |
|---|---|---|---|
| Achdorf | 0 | 540 | Kreuzung mit dem Querweg Freiburg–Bodensee; Kreuzung mit dem Schluchtensteig |
| Wutachflühen Bei der Muttergottes | 4.0 | 575 | Naturschutzgebiet; Kreuzung mit dem Schluchtensteig |
| Footbridge over the Wutach | 2.5 | 505 | Flüheweg durch das Wutachtal |
| Gasthaus Wutachschlucht | 1.5 | 500 | Ehemaliger Haltepunkt Lausheim-Blumegg der stillgelegten Wutachtalbahn (Sauschwänzlebahn) |
| Ehemaliger Bahnhof Weizen | 4.0 | 471 | Bahnhof der stillgelegten Wutachtalbahn (Sauschwänzlebahn); Kreuzung mit dem Schluchtensteig |
| Katzenloch | 1.0 | 530 | |
| Stühlingen | 3.5 | 501 | Kreuzung mit dem Schluchtensteig |

=== Twelfth stage: Stühlingen – Schaffhausen ===
==== Overview ====
- Distance: 19 km
- Journey time: c. 5 hours

| Place/Attraction | Route (km) | Höhe (m ü. NHN) | Further information |
|---|---|---|---|
| Stühlingen | 0 | 501 | |
| Stühlingen-Grenzübergang | 1.0 | 450 | |
| Schleitheim | 2.5 | 467 | |
| Strickhof | 2.5 | 580 | |
| Schleitheimer Schlossranden | 2.0 | 901 | Schleitheimer Randenturm |
| Zelgli | 1.0 | 865 | |
| Bräunlingsbuck | 2.5 | 778 | |
| Chlosterfeld | 2.0 | 655 | |
| Schaffhausen | 5.5 | 400 | |

==== Route description ====
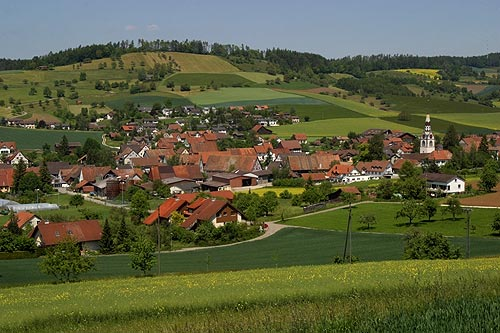
Schleitheim

The route leaves Stühlingen via Hauptstraße and Bahnhofstraße.

== Literature ==
Reinhard Distel und Heinz R. Wittner: Wanderführer Schwarzwald-Höhenwege. 7th edn., Ostfildern, 1997. ISBN 3-8134-0213-4. pp. 111–141
