= Nagold Dam =

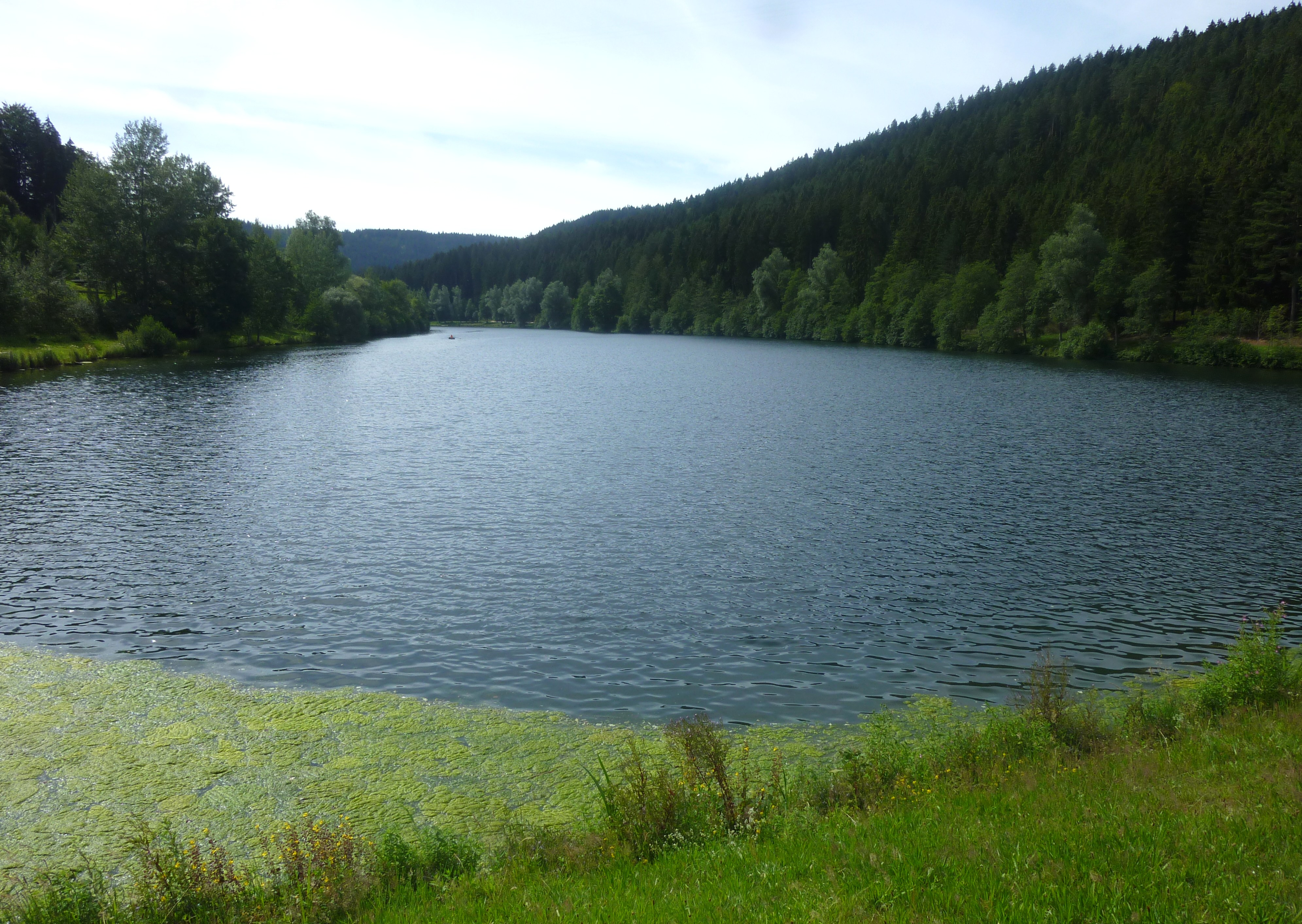
- Interactive map of Nagold Dam
- Location: Freudenstadt
- Coordinates: 48.5627°N 8.5009°E
- Construction began: 1965–1970

Dam and spillways
- Impounds: Nagold
- Height: 32.10 m (105.3 ft)
- Height (foundation): 35 m (115 ft)
- Length: 235 m (771 ft)
- Elevation at crest: 552.10 m (1,811.4 ft)
- Width (crest): 9.2 m (30 ft)
- Width (base): 145 m (476 ft)
- Dam volume: 311,000 m^{3} (11,000,000 cu ft)
- Spillway capacity: 129 m/s ?

Reservoir
- Total capacity: 5.065×10^{6} m^{3} (1.789×10^{8} cu ft)
- Active capacity: 4.50×10^{6} m^{3} (1.59×10^{8} cu ft)
- Catchment area: 39 km^{2} (15 sq mi)
- Surface area: 0.54850 km^{2} (0.21178 sq mi)
- Maximum length: 2.050 km (1.274 mi)

The Nagold Dam (German: Nagoldtalsperre, also Erzgrube) is a dam in the German state of Baden-Württemberg. It was built between 1965 and 1970, and provides flood and drought protection in the Nagold valley. The dam lies within the county of Freudenstadt and was taken into service in 1971, and the nearest settlement is Seewald-Erzgrube.

== Leisure ==
Its location in the middle of a 650 hectare protected area in the Black Forest makes the impounded Nagold Reservoir a popular recreation area. From 1 April to 30 September, sailing is permitted on the lake. The dam has a pre-dam about 800 metres above the head of the reservoir.

== Gallery ==
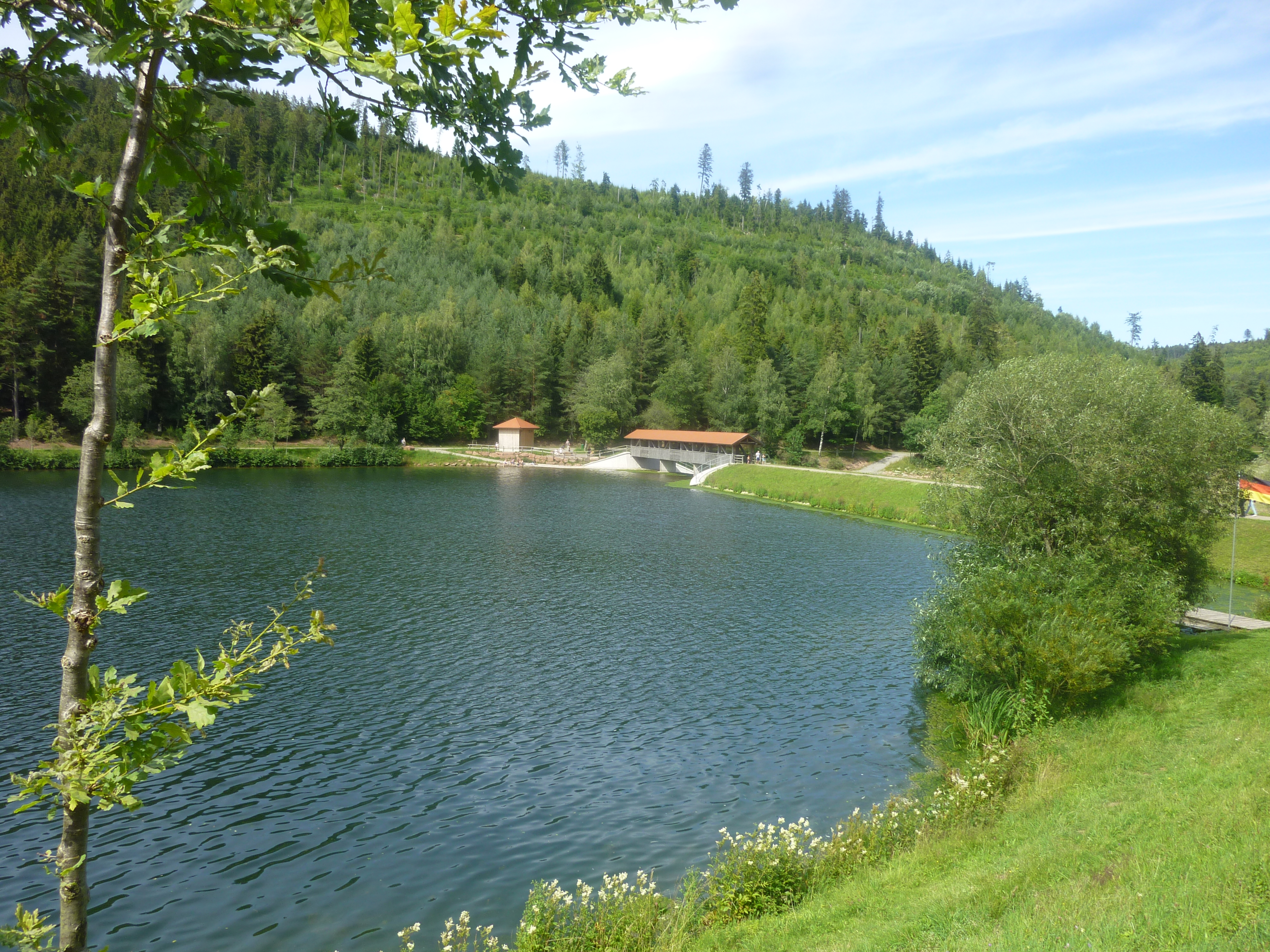
Pre-dam

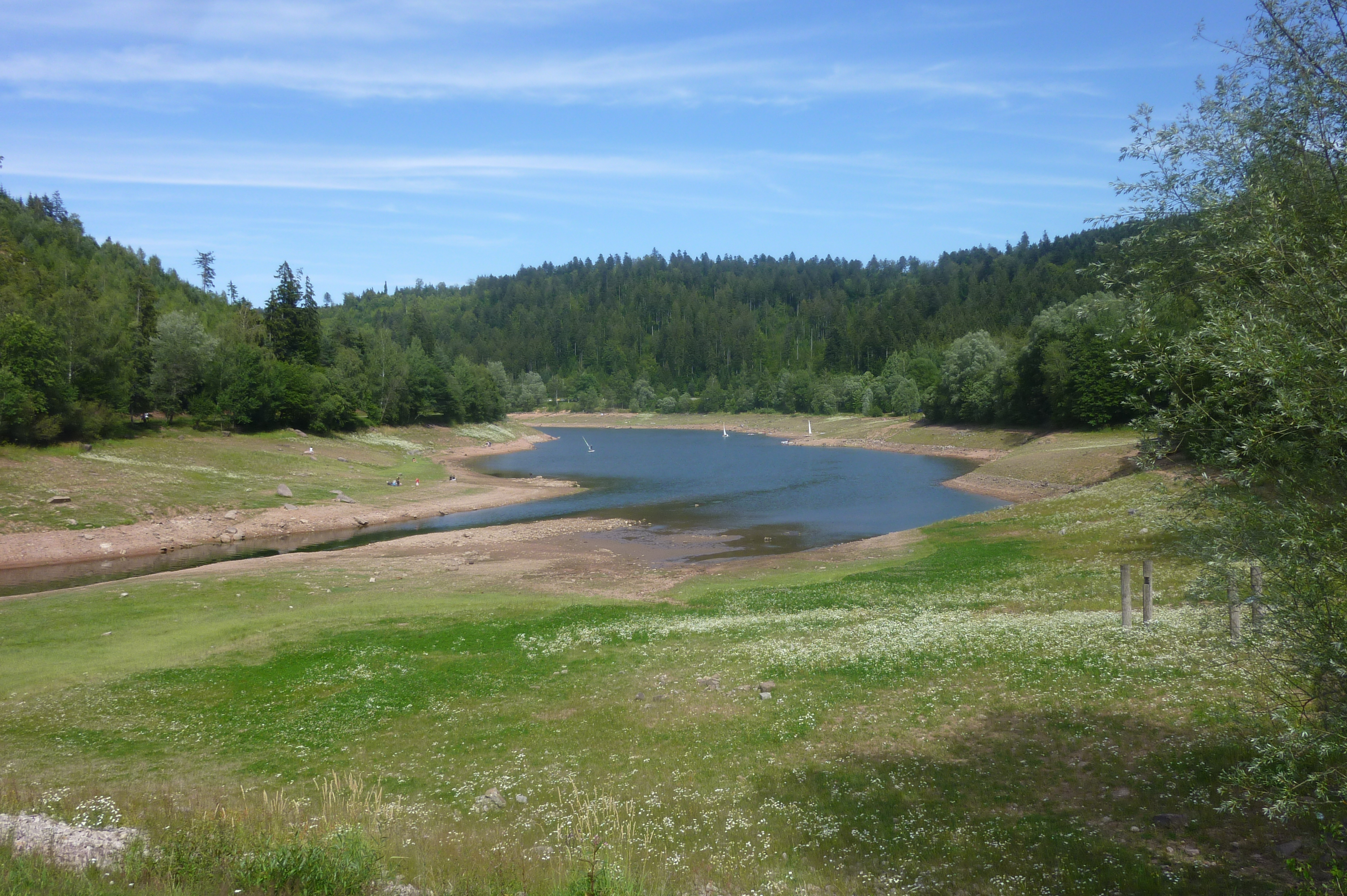
Lower part of the reservoir at low water

== See also ==
- List of dams in Germany

== Literature ==
- Peter Franke, Wolfgang Frey: Talsperren in der Bundesrepublik Deutschland, DNK – DVWK 1987, ISBN 3-926520-00-0.
