= Wörnersberg =

- Municipality
- Coat of arms

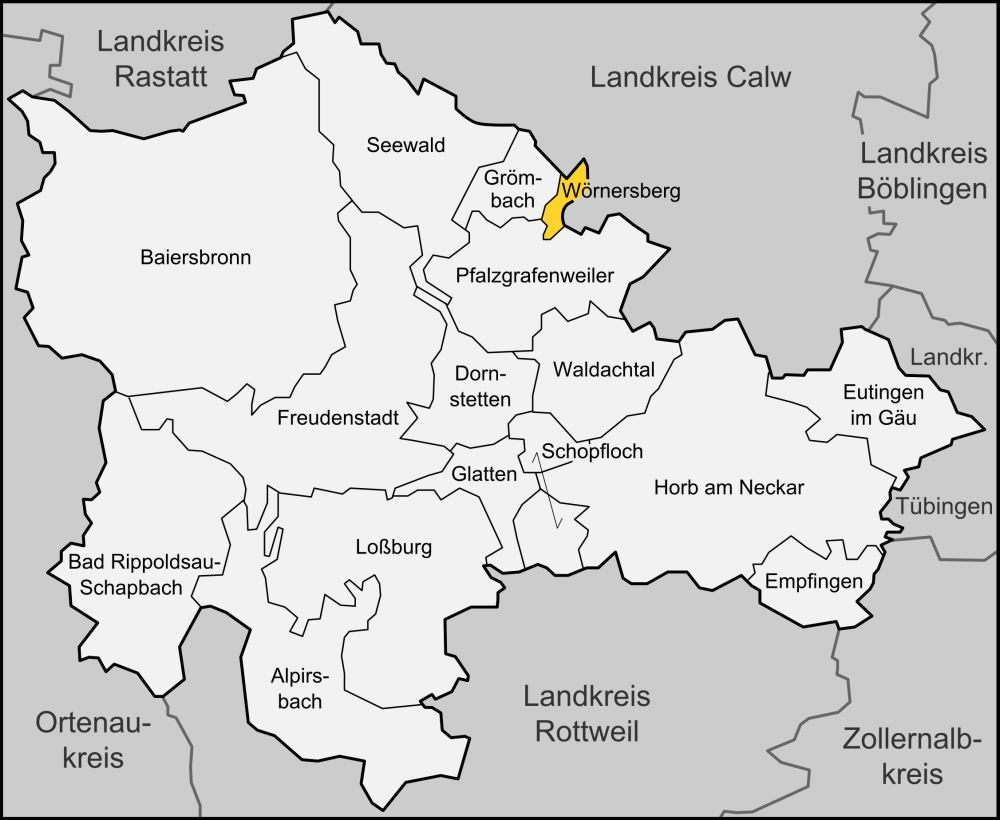
- Location of Wörnersberg within Freudenstadt district
- Interactive map of Wörnersberg
- Location within Germany Location within Baden-Württemberg
- Coordinates: 48°33′44″N 8°33′52″E
- Country: Germany
- State: Baden-Württemberg
- Admin. region: Karlsruhe
- District: Freudenstadt

Government
  - Mayor (2014–22): Reinhold Möhrle

Area
  - Total: 3.48 km^{2} (1.34 sq mi)
- Elevation: 618 m (2,028 ft)

Population (2025-12-31)
  - Total: 210
  - Density: 60/km^{2} (160/sq mi)
- Time zone: UTC+01:00 (CET)
  - Summer (DST): UTC+02:00 (CEST)
- Postal codes: 72299
- Dialling codes: 07453
- Vehicle registration: FDS, HCH, HOR, WOL

Wörnersberg (German pronunciation: [ˈvœʁnɐsbɛʁk]) is a municipality in the district of Freudenstadt in Baden-Württemberg in southern Germany.

== Geography ==
Wörnersberg is located about 18 kilometers from the county town of Freudenstadt, nestled between meadows and woods in the central Black Forest in 600 to 700 meters above sea level. Approximately 56% of the district is forested.

== Municipality arrangement ==
The municipality Wörnersberg includes the village Wörnersberg and the house Reesenmühle.

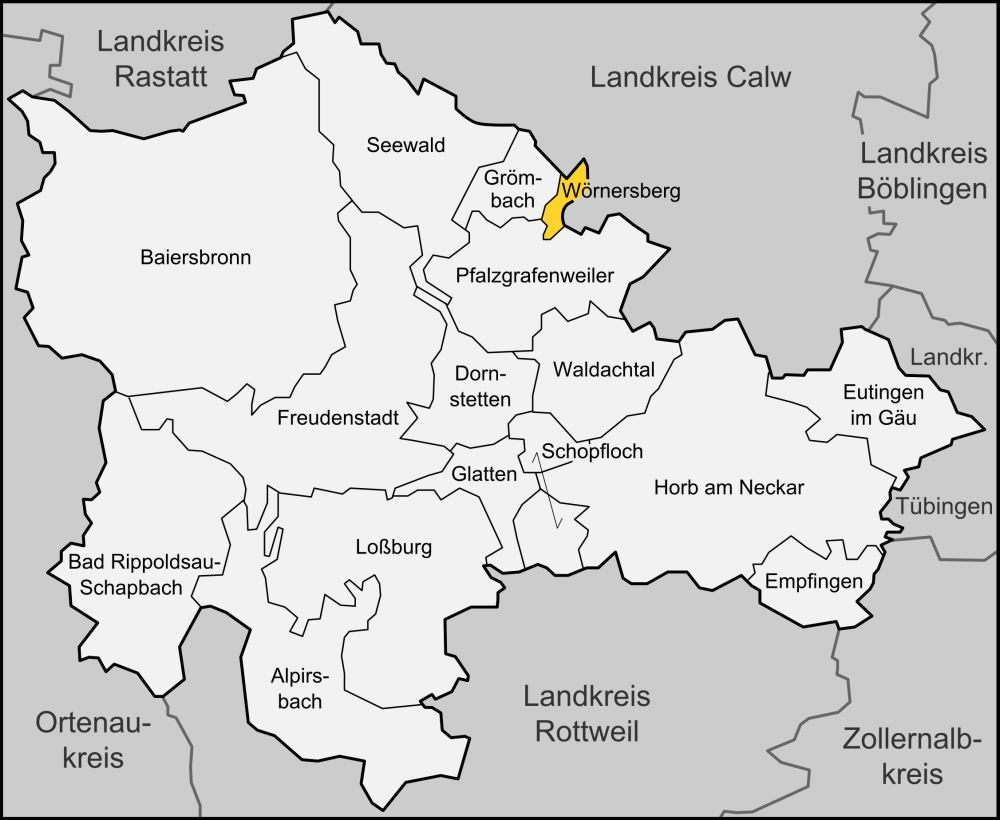
Wörnersberg in the district of Freudenstadt

== History ==
Wörnersberg was first documented in 1364, in 1487 a church was built. The Duchy of Württemberg acquired 1614 "semi Wörnersberg with all righteousness". The division did not last long, because already in 1625 bought Württemberg also the other half of the village with five farmers and a half day laborers.

== Religions ==
Wörnersberg had indeed a church, but no priest. The pastor was supported from the parish Grömbach. Wörnersberg had to give him a horse and after the service a meal. The Protestant church community Wörnersberg has a former pilgrimage church (Our Lady) with Romanesque and Gothic elements and is part of the church district Nagold.

== Population Development ==
With an average age of 36 years Wörnersberg was the end of 2010, the municipality with the youngest average population in Baden Württemberg. 2011 Wörnersberg lost that position on Riedhausen in district Ravensburg.
