= Zavelstein Castle =

Burgruine Zavelstein
- Bad Teinach-Zavelstein
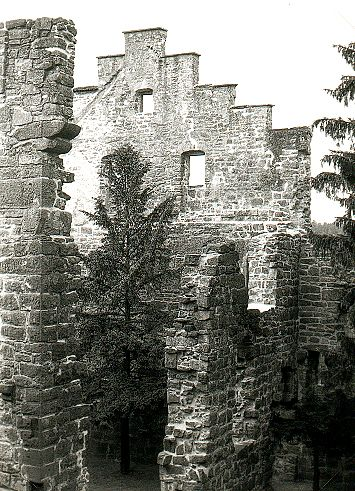
- Ruins of Zavelstein in 1977

Site information
- Type: Höhenburg, Ortslage
- Code: DE-BW
- Condition: ruin

Location
- Coordinates: 48°41′32.28″N 8°41′28.32″E
- Height: 560 m above sea level (NN)

Site history
- Built: c. 1200

Garrison information
- Occupants: counts

The ruins of Zavelstein Castle, a former hill castle, stand at 560 m above sea level (NN) on a hill spur above the Teinach valley on the southeastern edge of the municipality of Bad Teinach-Zavelstein in the county of Calw in the south German state of Baden-Württemberg.

== History ==
Archaeological investigations revealed that the castle must have been built around the middle of the 13th century. The first written record of the castle dates to 1303, from which it is clear that a Herr Richelin, a knight in Zavelstein, had lived in the castle, probably from 1280. By 1311 Zavelstein surfaces in the documents as a Württemberg castle and was thus owned by the counts of Württemberg. Together with their lordship of the castles of Neuenbürg, Calw, Fautsberg, Wildberg and Nagold, they were able to maintain their influence over the newly acquired territories in the northeastern Black Forest.

In the 14th century, the castle was frequently let out as a fief or used as a security. In 1342, Paul of Giltlingen sold the fief of the castle for 1,530 pounds of hellers to Count Götz of Tübingen. Three years later Zavelstein was transferred for a pledge of 5,000 pounds of hellers from Count Ulrich IV and Eberhard II of Württemberg to Count Palatine William of Tübingen. Because William died one year later without issue, Zavelstein returned to Württemberg in accordance with the contract. The castle became a Leibgedinge in 1365 for William's brother, Götz of Tübingen, but he gave it up just one year later.

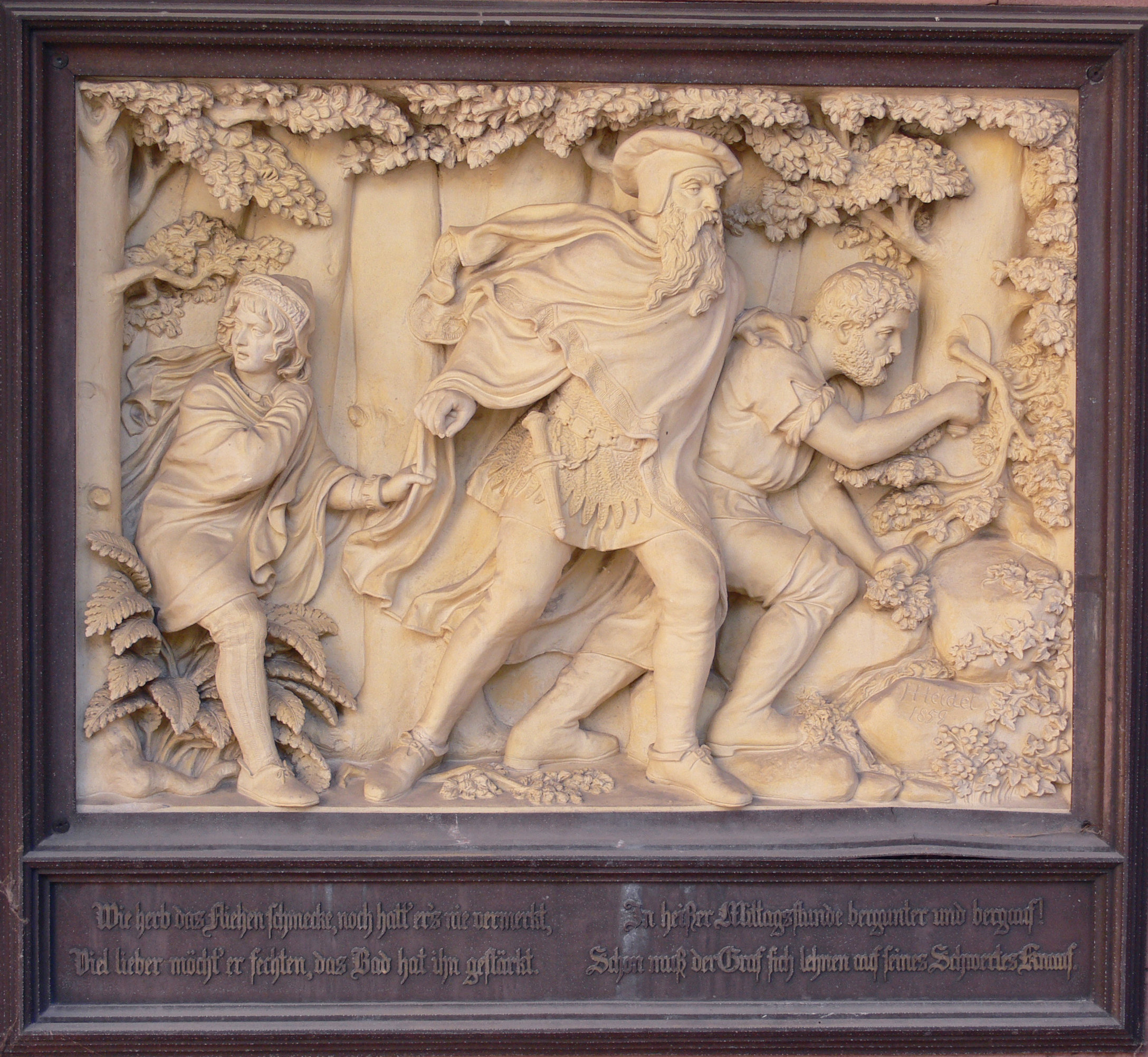
Ambush in Wildbad

Zavelstein Castle gained significance in 1367, when the Count of Württemberg Eberhard II, the Whiner (der Greiner) and his son, Ulrich, were able to escape to the castle from an ambush in the Wildbad by the House of Martinsvögel. Due to the poor financial situation of the House of Württemberg the fief of the Barony of Zavelstein was constantly extended.

From a 1396 deed, it is clear that the pledge to Gerhard of Straubenhardt had passed down to his legal successors, Straub of Straubenhardt and Schimpf Gültlingen. It was not until 1468 that Burkhard von Ehingen was given an order to settle the income of the castle and town of Zavelstein for 2,600 guilders. The knights of Ehingen held ownership rights until 1552. During the Peasant Wars, the castle was damaged in 1525 but not occupied. Duke Christopher of Württemberg redeemed the pledge in 1552 from Hans of Ehingen

In 1554, Jordan of Braitenbach on Roßnitz was enfeoffed with the castle. From 1554 to 1589, he repaired the castle facilities for 3,500 guilders, as can be seen from the bills for construction work. After his death in 1593, his widow Agnes of Braitenbach presumably continued to live there. After her death in 1612, the fief was transferred by John Frederick of Württemberg to Freiherr Benjamin Buwinghausen of Wallmerode. In 1620 the Freiherr of Zavelstein bought it and began extensive building work that lasted until 1630. During this time, the castle was rebuilt into a schloss. In 1634, the castle was plundered after the Battle of Nördlingen. After the baron died of the plague in 1635 in Stuttgart, his son James Frederick Buwinghausen took possession of the property. He subsequently became well known as the Obervogt of Calw, especially in connexion with witch trials. In 1686, Eberhard Frederick Buwinghausen took possession of the estate as well as his father's offices.

Following the destruction of Hirsau and Calw, Zavelstein was destroyed in 1692 by French troops under Melac. Only a few parts of the castle remained habitable, but Zavelstein was abandoned by the Buwinghausens. Eberhard Frederick Buwinghausen sold the estate to Duke Eberhard Louis of Württemberg in 1710 for 20,000 guilders. However, the castle was not rebuilt and remained a ruin. In 1844, the stairs of the bergfried were renewed and it has been used since as a viewing tower. In 1991, archaeological investigations were carried out during reconstruction work.

== Site ==
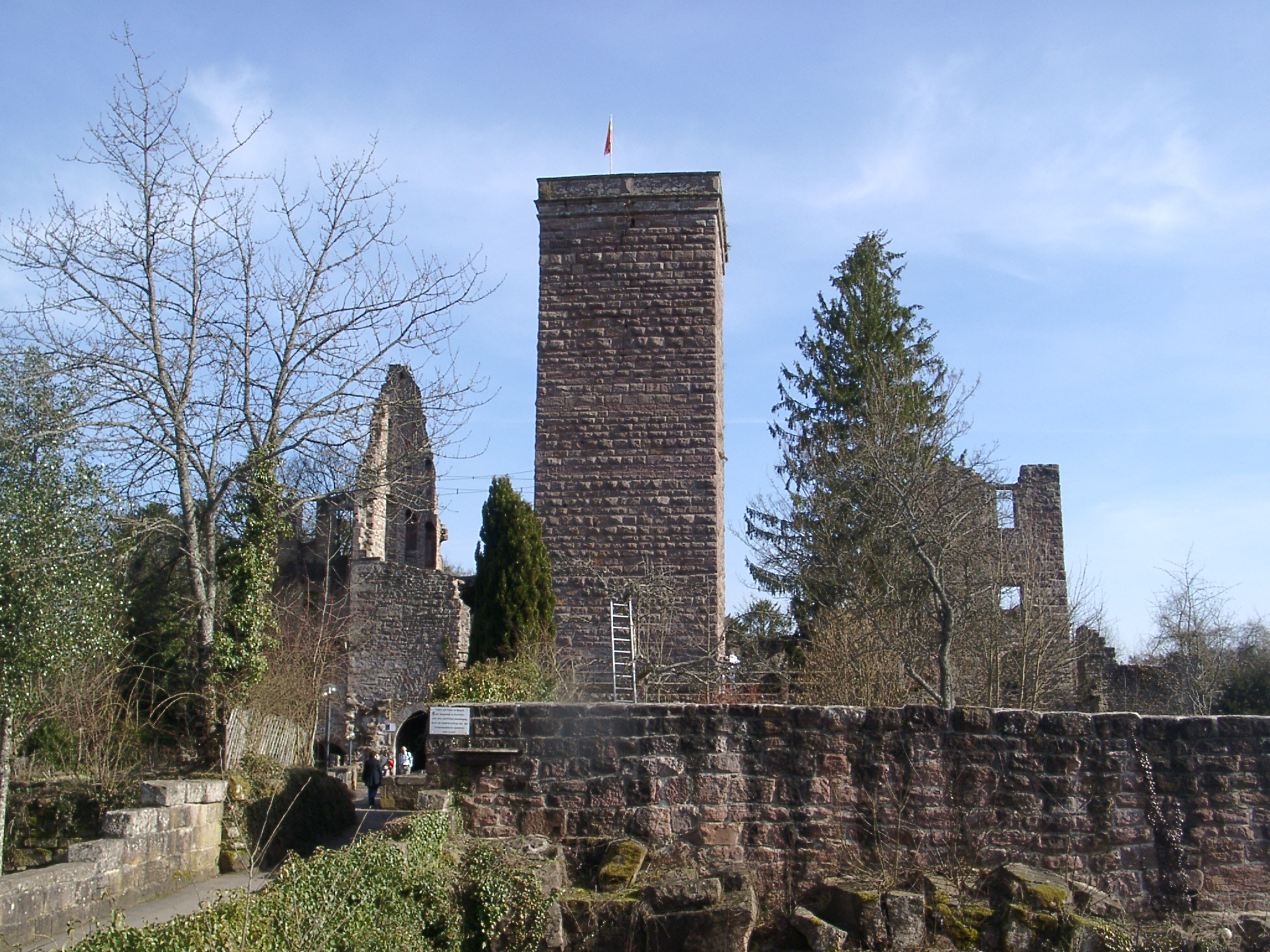
The ruins of Zavelstein

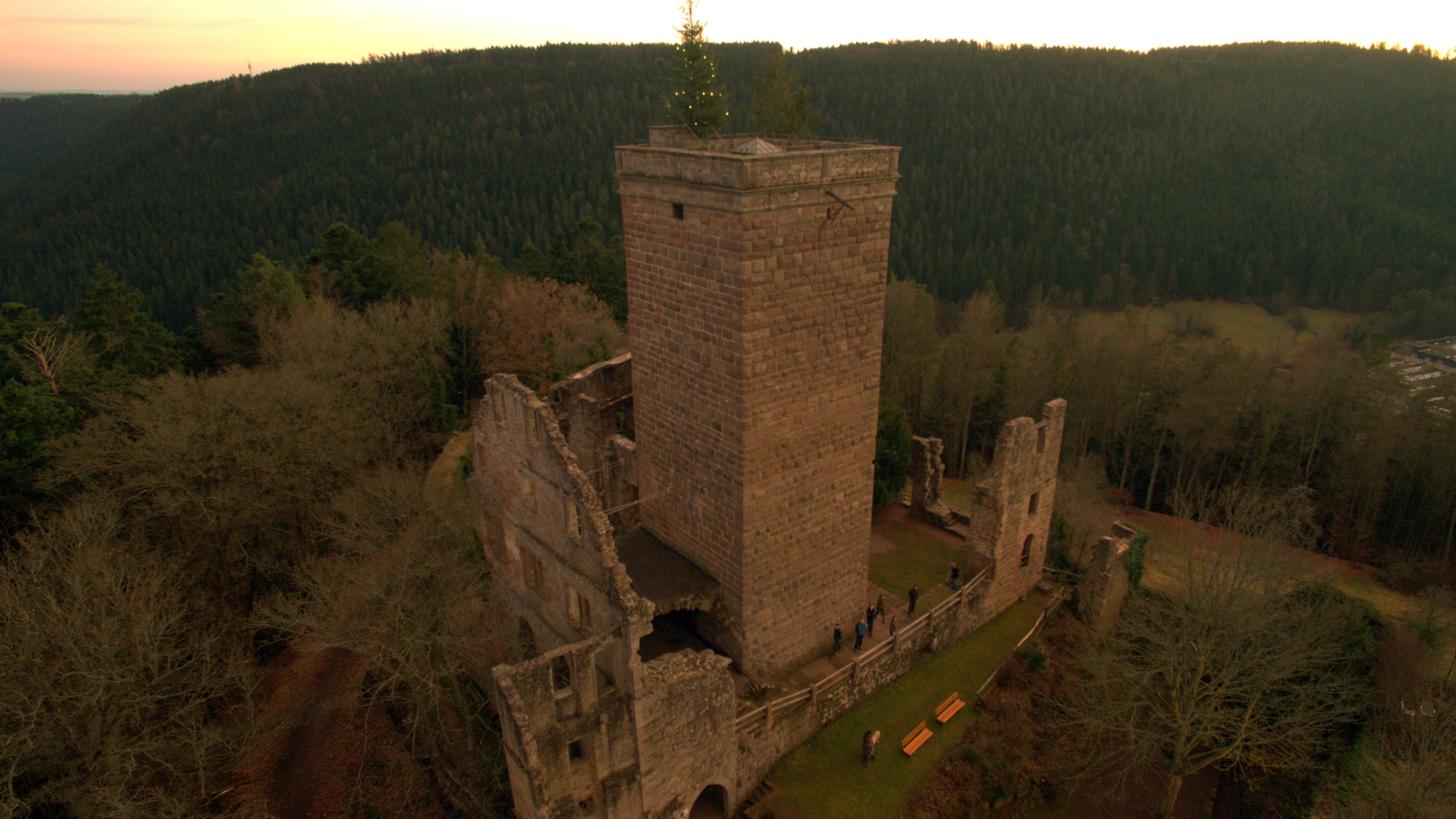
The ruins of Zavelstein at Christmas

Of the former Hohenstaufen castle only the late Romanesque inner ward survives. Other recognisable remains are the two neck ditches, the gateway, the ruins of the palas, a vaulted cellar, parts of the shield wall and other wall remains of the enceinte and zwinger and the 28-metre-high bergfried.

== Literature ==
- Max Miller, Gerhard Taddey: Handbuch der historischen Stätten Deutschlands. Vol. 6. Baden-Württemberg. Stuttgart, 1965
- Karl Greiner: Bad Teinach und Zavelstein. Ein Geschichtsbild vom 13. bis zum 20. Jahrhundert Pforzheim, 1986
- Dieter Planck [ed.]: Archäologische Ausgrabungen in Baden Württemberg 1991. Theiss, Stuttgart, 1992, ISBN 3-8062-1019-5
- Dieter Planck [ed.]: Archäologische Ausgrabungen in Baden Württemberg 1992. Theiss, Stuttgart, 1993, ISBN 3-8062-1070-5
- Timm Radt: Schloss Zavelstein - Ein unbeachtetes Bauwerk Heinrich Schickhardts. In: Georg Ulrich Großmann: Forschungen zu Burgen und Schlössern. Vol. 13. Die Burg zur Zeit der Renaissance. Deutscher Kunstverlag, Berlin/Munich, 2010, pp. 87–100, ISBN 978-3-422-07023-3
