= Nagold (river) =

River in Germany

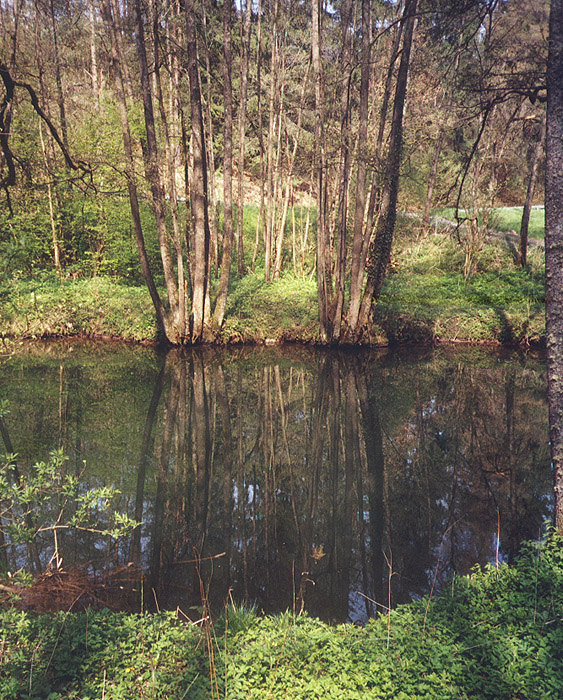
- The Nagold in its middle reaches between Nagold and Calw

Location
- Country: Germany
- State: Baden-Württemberg

Physical characteristics
- Source
  - location: Urnagold
  - coordinates: 48°36′18″N 8°26′12.5″E
  - elevation: 814 m (2,671 ft)
- Mouth
  - location: Enz in Pforzheim
  - coordinates: 48°53′19″N 8°42′16″E
  - elevation: 247 m (810 ft)
- Length: 90.8 km (56.4 mi)
- Basin size: 1,144 km^{2} (442 sq mi)
- Discharge
  - average: Calw: lowest ever: 1.17 m^{3}/s (41 cu ft/s) (2003), lowest average: 2.0 m^{3}/s (71 cu ft/s), average: 7.82 m^{3}/s (276 cu ft/s)

Basin features
- Progression: Enz→ Neckar→ Rhine→ North Sea
- Tributaries
  - left: Teinach
  - right: Waldach, Würm

The Nagold (German pronunciation: [ˈnaːɡɔlt]) is a river in Baden-Württemberg, southwestern Germany. A tributary of the Enz, it gave its name to the town of Nagold. It merges with the smaller Enz in the town centre of Pforzheim.

== Physical geography ==
=== General ===
The Nagold is 90.7 kilometres in length and has its source in Urnagold in the municipality of Seewald in the Northern Black Forest and flows in an easterly direction past Nagold, Calw and Liebenzell and joins the Enz in Pforzheim, near what is now the Parkhotel Pforzheim.

The Nagold flows mainly through the Black Forest. Around the town of Nagold (between Rohrdorf and Pfrondorf) it flows through the Heckengäu region. At the Pforzheimer Kupferhammer, it enters the Pforzheim Enz Valley, which, like the Heckengäu, also belongs to the natural region of the Gäu.

The Nagold is regarded by convention as a tributary of Enz. However, it carries more water than the upper course of the Enz at their confluence, is longer by a factor of about 2, and has a larger catchment by a factor of 3.5. Hydrographically, therefore, the main line of the Enz-Nagold-river system runs along it them. The upper Enz, however, has the wider valley and maintains its direction of flow.

The upper reaches of Nagold run predominantly east and southeast as far as the town of Nagold, where it swings almost completely around, to head to Pforzheim, mainly in a northerly direction. The Nagold has formed numerous loops and 'meander hills' (Umlaufberge), for example at Pfrondorf (Bettenberg), in Wildberg, at Hof Waldeck (Schlossberg hill and Waldeck Castle), near Tannenberg (Rudersberg, with hillfort) and in Weißenstein.

The source of the Nagold is a spring called the Nagoldursprung at Urnagold in the municipality of Seewald, on the territory of Besenfeld. After just a few kilometres, at Erzgrube, the Nagold is impounded to form the Nagold Reservoir. Up to the first town, Altensteig, the Nagold valley is mostly uninhabited. In front of Rohrdorf, the Nagold leaves the Black Forest, makes its great change of direction at the foot of the ruins of Hohennagold and enters the Black Forest again north of Pfrondorf.

The Nagold now passes through the above mentioned meander hills as well as its most important settlements: Wildberg, Calw, Hirsau and Bad Liebenzell. Between Dillstein and Pforzheim the Nagold leaves the Black Forest and enters into the former old town of Pforzheim merging with the Enz from the right and south. The Enz then continues eastwards to Besigheim where it empties into the Neckar.

=== Tributaries ===
The main tributaries of the Nagold are the:

- Zinsbach, a right-hand tributary, 13.3 km long with a 33.8 km^{2} catchment, which joins the Nagold before the town of Altensteig
- Köllbach, a left-hand tributary, 10.0 km long with a 29.9 km^{2} catchment, which joins after the town of Altensteig
- Waldach, a right-hand tributary, 24.7 km long with a 157.1 km^{2} catchment, which joins at the Nagold Knee (Nagoldknie) in the borough of Nagold
- Teinach, a left-hand tributary, 15.4 km long with a catchment of 61.5 km^{2}, which joins near Teinachtal.
- Würm, a right-hand tributary, 53.9 km long with a catchment of 418.3 km^{2}, which joins south of Pforzheim, shortly before leaving the Black Forest

== Political geography ==
The Nagold flows through the counties of Freudenstadt, Calw and Pforzheim (urban county).

Until the great territorial upheavals around 1803 and 1806, the course of the Nagold was predominantly on the territory of Old Württemberg. Smaller areas belonged to the Margraviate of Baden or the Order of Saint John. Altensteig, Nagold, Wildberg, Calw and Liebenzell were the administrative centres of the Old Württemberg; Hirsau and Reuthin were Old Württemberg monastic estates. Hirsau Abbey was important in European history. The present areas around Pforzheim (territories of Weißenstein, Dillstein and Pforzheim) belonged to Baden. Rohrdorf was the seat of a commandry of the Order of Saint John under Württemberg's sovereignty.

== Transportation ==
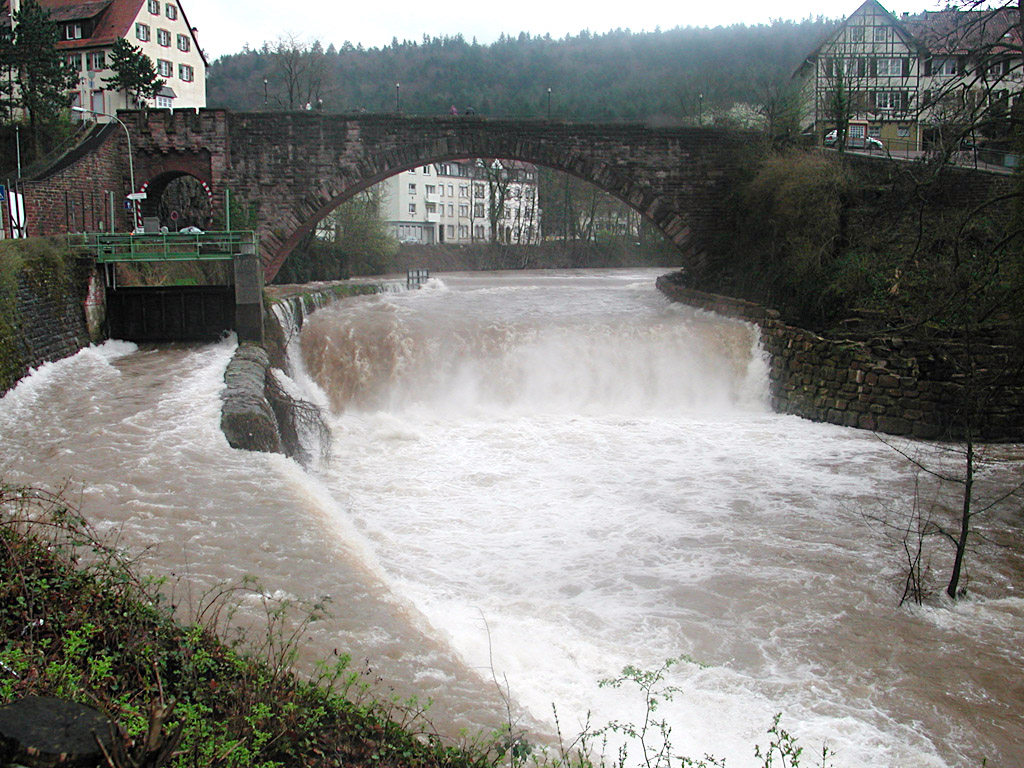
The Nagold in Weißenstein with the arch bridge in the background

The Nagold valley between Pforzheim and Altensteig forms the backbone of various main transport axes. North-south traffic between Pforzheim and Nagold and further towards Horb is carried by the B 463 and Nagold Valley Railway. Between Nagold and Altensteig the Nagold valley picks up the important east-west link of the B 28 (whose traffic increasingly however is switching further south to the direct link between Freudenstadt, Horb and Tübingen, because the B 28 between Tübingen and Freudenstadt via Herrenberg, Nagold and Altensteig runs in a large arc to the north). Until its closure in 1967 there was a narrow gauge railway between Nagold and Altensteig: the Altensteigerle.

== Economy ==
Timber rafting was important in the Black Forest until the early 20th century. Like the Enz, the Nagold was used to transport logs. Many places, such as Weißenstein, earned their living from timber rafting and ponds were created in the river for this purpose, e.g. near the village of Erzgrube.

In the Black Forest today, the timber industry is still important; around Nagold agriculture is more prominent. Heavy industry and service industries play a key role, especially in Pforzheim (jewellery, precious metals, clocks, business, administration), as well as Ebhausen, Nagold, Kentheim (historic cotton mill), Calw (county town) and Liebenzell (spa).

== Protected areas ==
On its way to its confluence with the Enz, the Nagold runs mainly through protected areas.

1. In its upper reaches in the county of Freudenstadt is the Nagoldtal protected area, covering 555.5 hectares, which was established on 1 July 1991 as number 2.37.044 by Freudenstadt council.
2. In the county of Calw the protected area is still called the Nagoldtal. It covers 4,384 hectares and was established by Calw council as no. 2.35.037 on 24 November 1971.
3. In its lower reaches to its mouth the Nagold flows through the protected are of Landschaftsschutzgebiet für den Stadtkreis Pforzheim, established by the town council of Pforzheim as no. 2.31.001 on 12 December 1994.

== Literature ==
- Max Scheifele: Als die Wälder auf Reisen gingen. Flößerei im Enz-Nagold-Gebiet. Verlag G. Braun, Karlsruhe, 1996, ISBN 3-7650-8164-7.
