= Teinach =

River in Germany

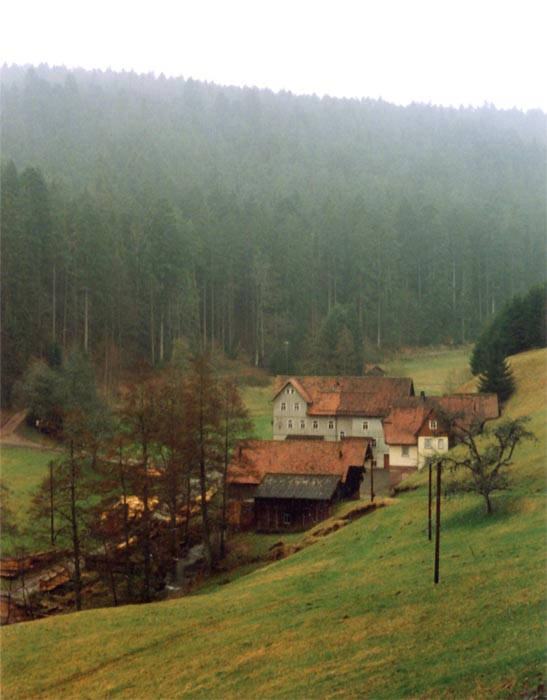

Location
- Country: Germany
- State: Baden-Württemberg

Physical characteristics
- Mouth
  - location: Nagold
  - coordinates: 48.6778°N 8.7253°E
- Length: 15.8 km (9.8 mi)

Basin features
- Progression: Nagold→ Enz→ Neckar→ Rhine→ North Sea

The Teinach is a river of Baden-Württemberg, southwestern Germany. It is a left tributary of the Nagold and flows for nearly 16 kilometres. It passes through Bad Teinach-Zavelstein.
