= Monbach =

River in Germany

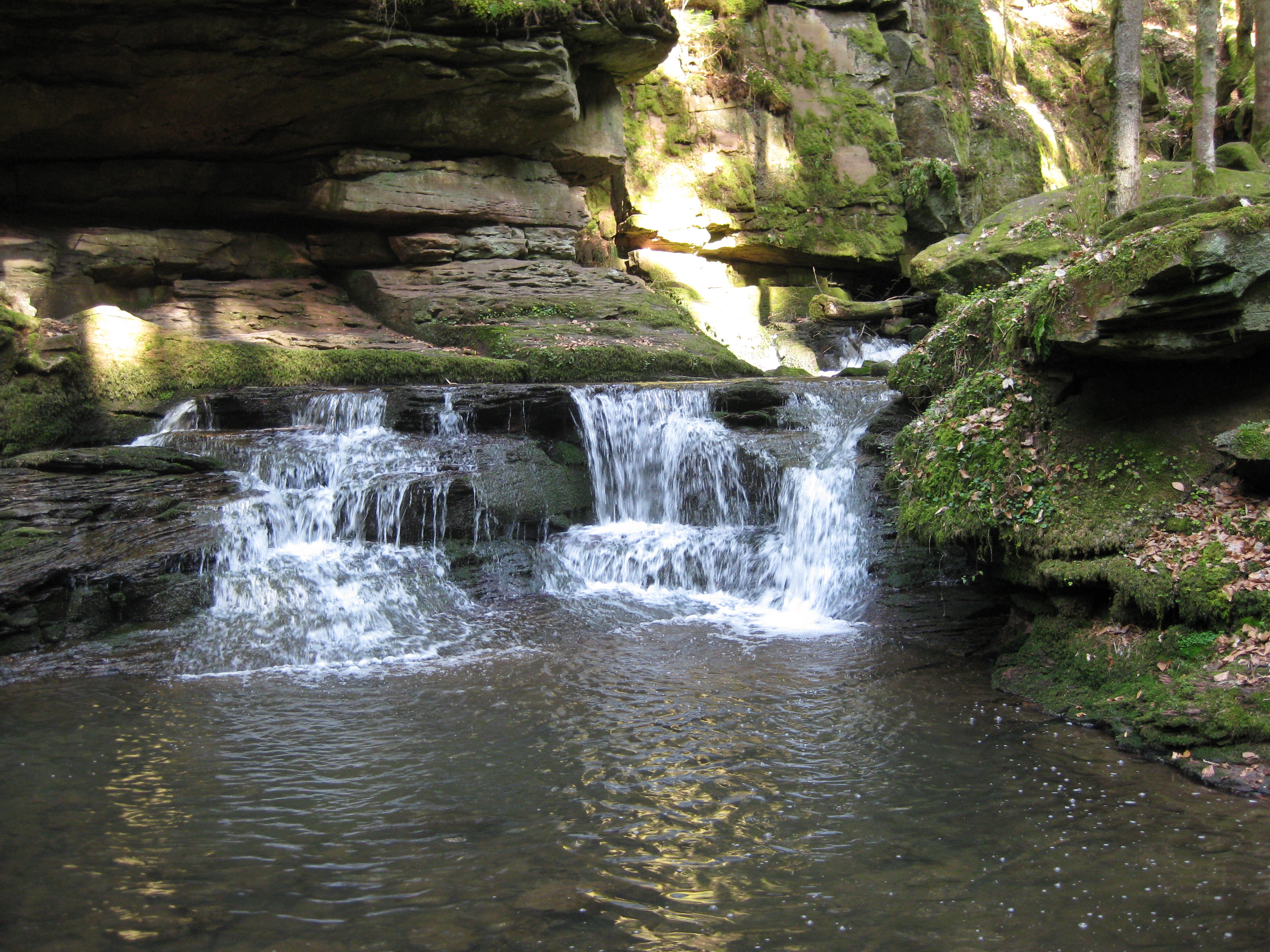

Location
- Country: Germany
- States: Baden-Württemberg

Physical characteristics
- Mouth
  - location: Nagold
  - coordinates: 48.7978°N 8.7291°E

Basin features
- Progression: Nagold→ Enz→ Neckar→ Rhine→ North Sea

Monbach is a river of Baden-Württemberg, Germany. It flows into the Nagold near Bad Liebenzell.

== Name ==
The name 'Monbach' is a bracketed form of 'Mon(nenkam)bach' meaning 'stream of Monakam'. The place name Monakam, in turn, is composed of the Old High German personal name 'Mundo' and the word 'kam' for 'mountain ridge, crest'.

== See also ==
- List of rivers of Baden-Württemberg
