= Schopfloch =

- Municipality
- Coat of arms

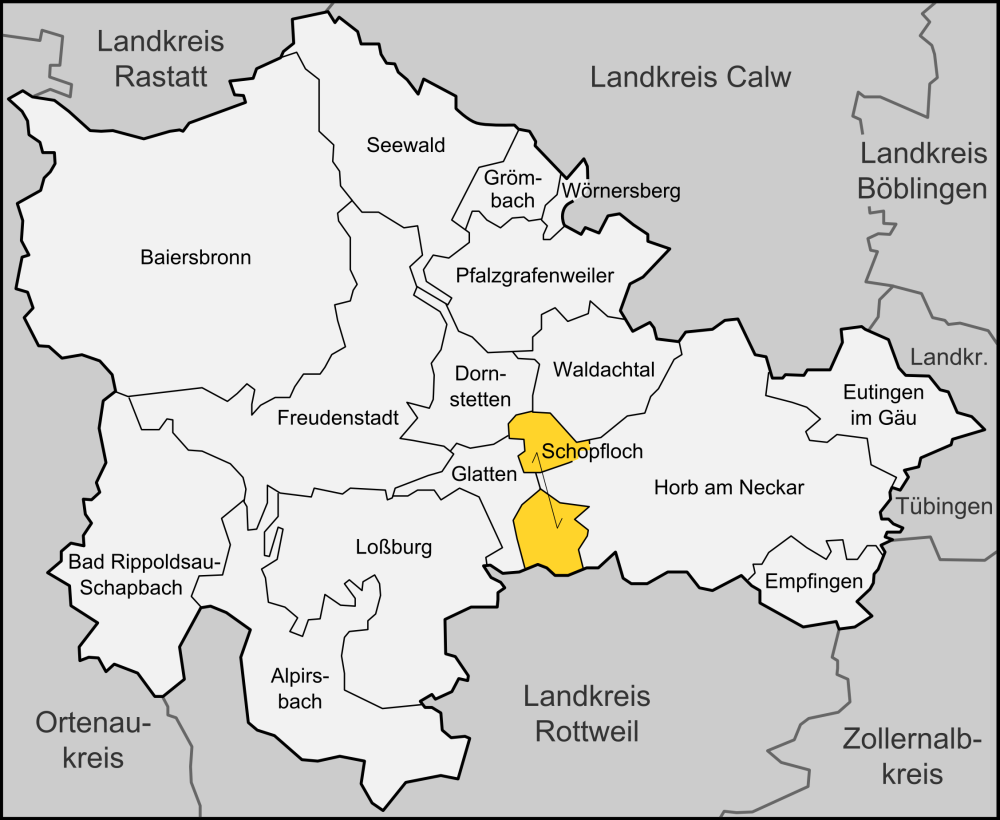
- Location of Schopfloch within Freudenstadt district
- Interactive map of Schopfloch
- Location within Germany Location within Baden-Württemberg
- Coordinates: 48°27′16″N 8°33′5″E
- Country: Germany
- State: Baden-Württemberg
- Admin. region: Karlsruhe
- District: Freudenstadt

Government
  - Mayor (2022–30): Thomas Fred Staubitzer

Area
  - Total: 17.03 km^{2} (6.58 sq mi)
- Elevation: 667 m (2,188 ft)

Population (2025-12-31)
  - Total: 2,593
  - Density: 152.3/km^{2} (394.4/sq mi)
- Time zone: UTC+01:00 (CET)
  - Summer (DST): UTC+02:00 (CEST)
- Postal codes: 72296
- Dialling codes: 07443
- Vehicle registration: FDS, HCH, HOR, WOL
- Website: www.schopfloch.de

Schopfloch (German pronunciation: [ˈʃɔpflɔx]) is a municipality in the district of Freudenstadt in Baden-Württemberg in southern Germany. It is located in the northern part of the Black Forest (Schwarzwald).

Schopfloch consists of three communities: Schopfloch, Oberiflingen and Unteriflingen.
