= Liebeneck Castle =

- Würm
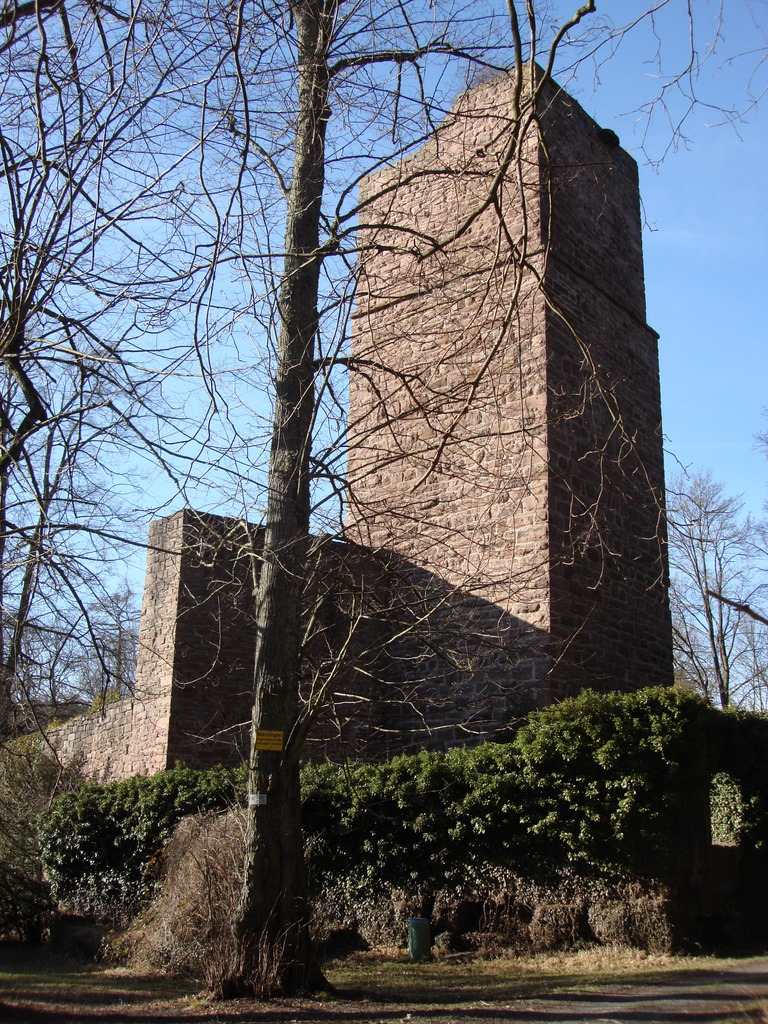
- The ruins of Liebeneck Castle – the bergfried

Site information
- Type: hill castle, spur castle
- Code: DE-BW
- Condition: ruin

Location
- Coordinates: 48°50′17″N 08°45′6″E
- Height: 415 m above sea level (NN)

Site history
- Built: 12th century

Garrison information
- Occupants: Herren

The ruins of Liebeneck Castle were once a high mediaeval spur castle in the southwestern part of the Heckengäu, a forested region southeast of the village of Würm, in the county of Pforzheim in the south German state of Baden-Württemberg.

== Location ==
The castle ruins are situated on heights above the River Würm with a view over the Würm valley. They lie in a Bannwald, a protected forest, at 415 metres above sea level. The ruins of Liebeneck cannot be reached by car; only forest tracks such as the Ostweg lead to it.

== History ==
The original castle was probably built in the 12th century. It is first mentioned in 1236 on the occasion of the transfer of the castle and village of Würm from the lords of Weißenstein at Kräheneck to Margrave Rudolph of Baden. The castle was intended to guard the rafting toll station by the river. Later the castle was an inherited fief of the lords of Weißenstein but it ended up being in the possession of the lords of Leutrum von Ertingen.

In 1692, during the Orleans War, the castle was razed. In 1828, it was transferred to the state of Baden. The site was then deliberately destroyed so that "no riff-raff will find shelter there" ("Gesindel dort keinen Unterschlupf findet"). From 1968 to 1977 the 30-metre-high bergfried was renovated.

== Site ==
Of the original castle, the bergfried and several walls surrounding the castle courtyard survive. This heritage site features the double, pentagonal enceinte with its foreworks and zwingers. The ruins are maintained by the Hochbauamt (construction department). Immediately by the ruins is an information board with details of the castle.

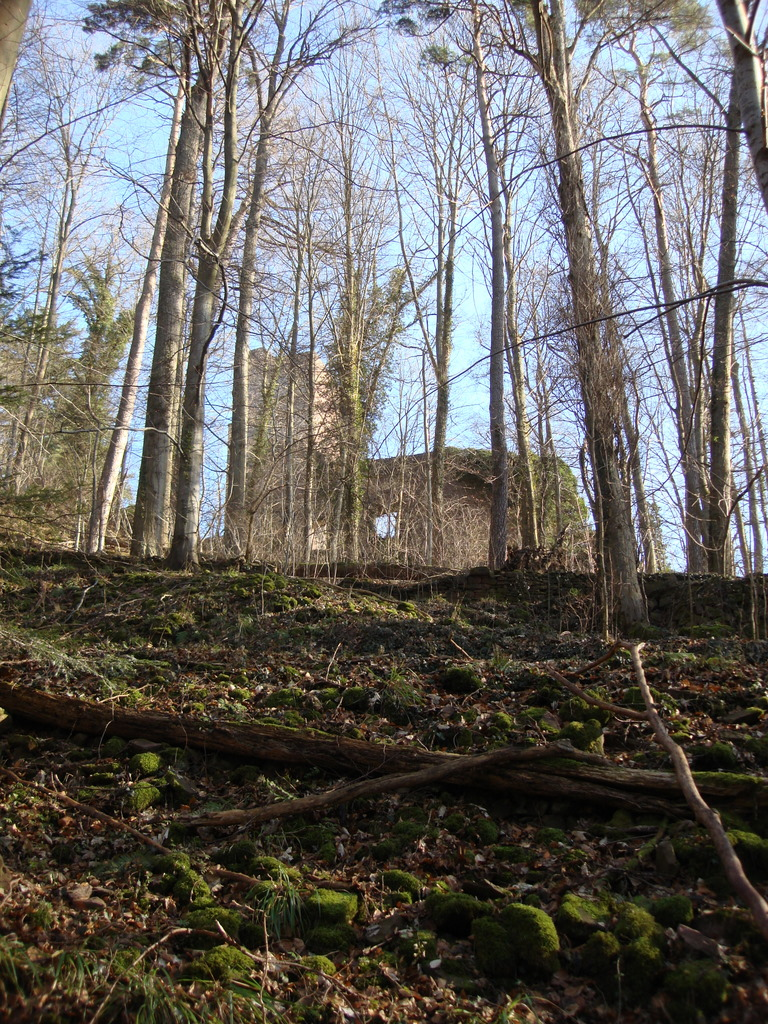
The castle seen from the wood

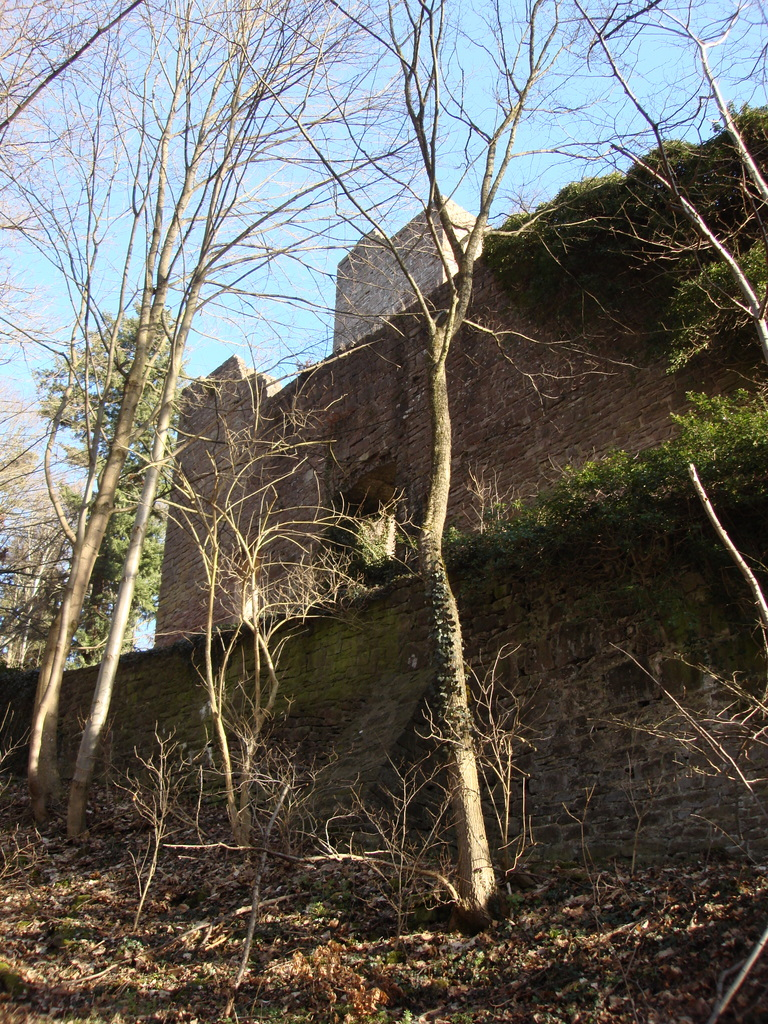
Rear of the castle seen from the wood

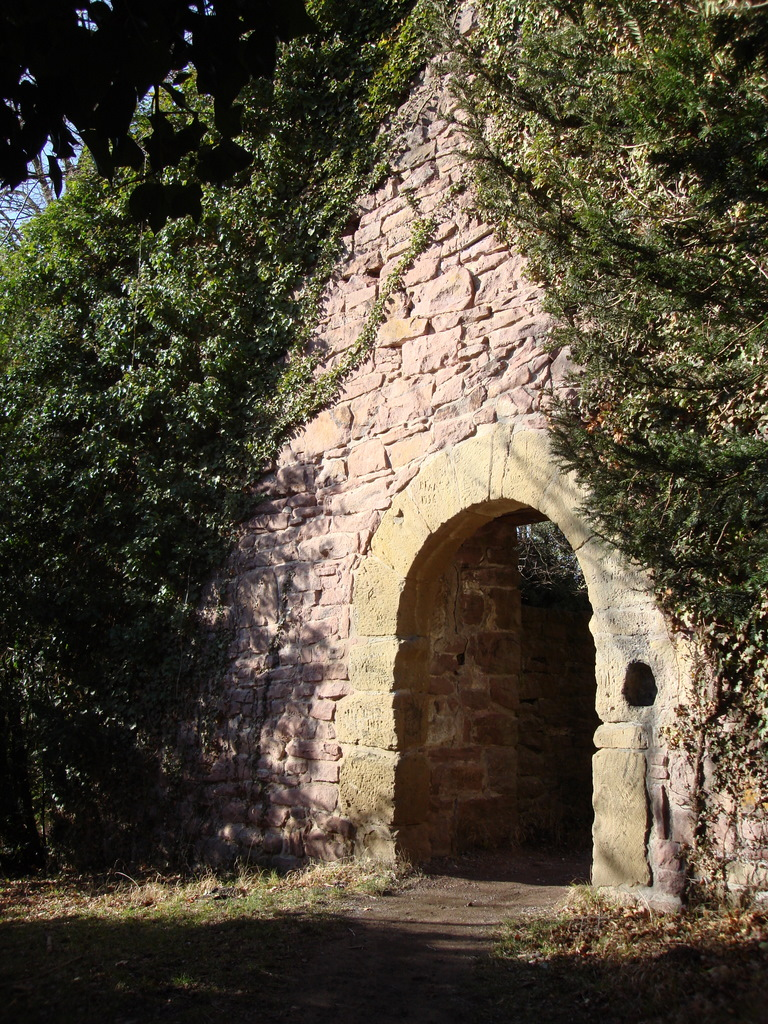
Entry to the main building

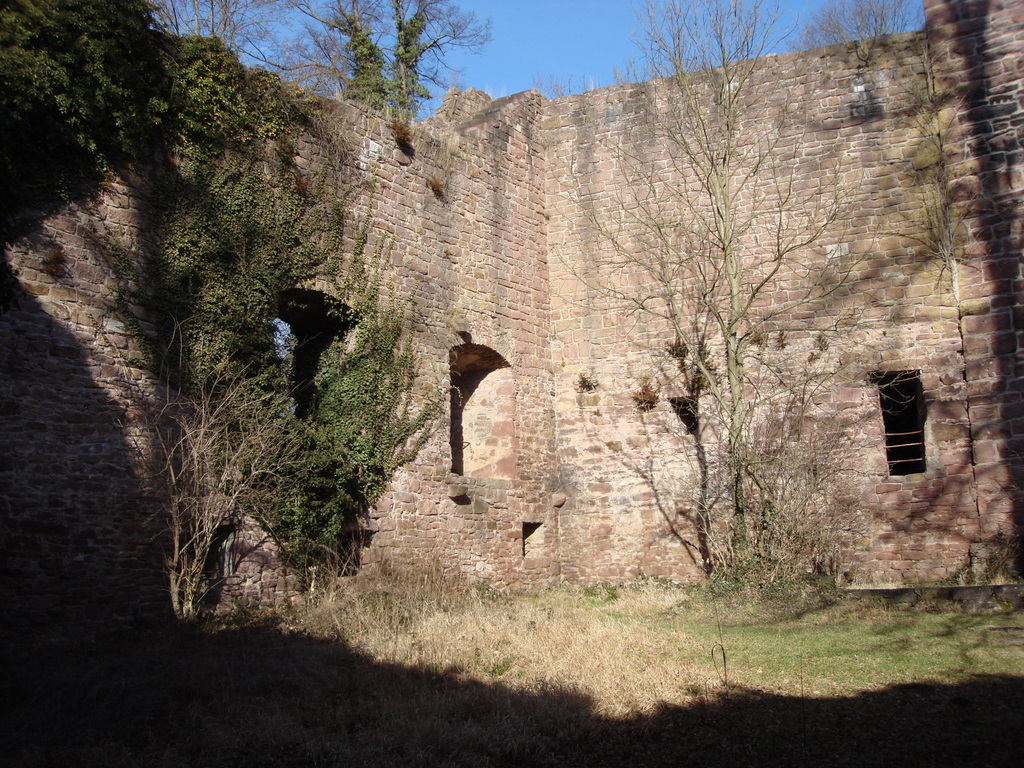
Main building interior

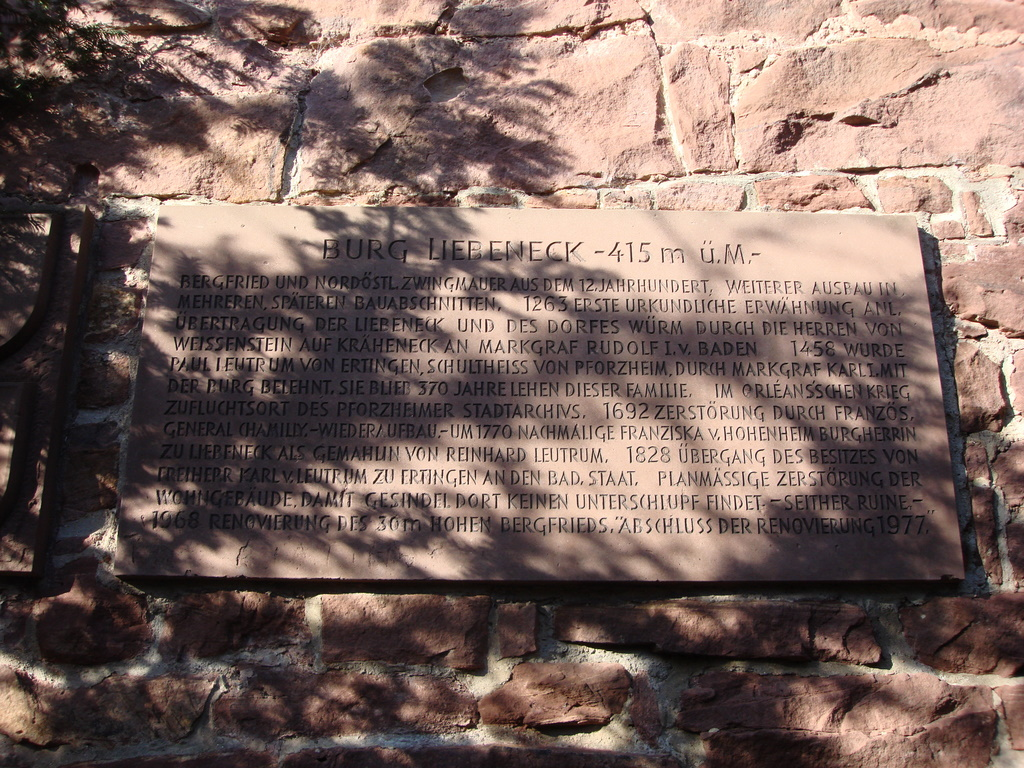
Information board

== Literature ==
- Friedrich-Wilhelm Krahe: Burgen des deutschen Mittelalters. Grundriss-Lexikon. Lizenzausgabe. Bechtermünz, Augsburg, 1996, ISBN 3-86047-219-4.
