= Waldach =

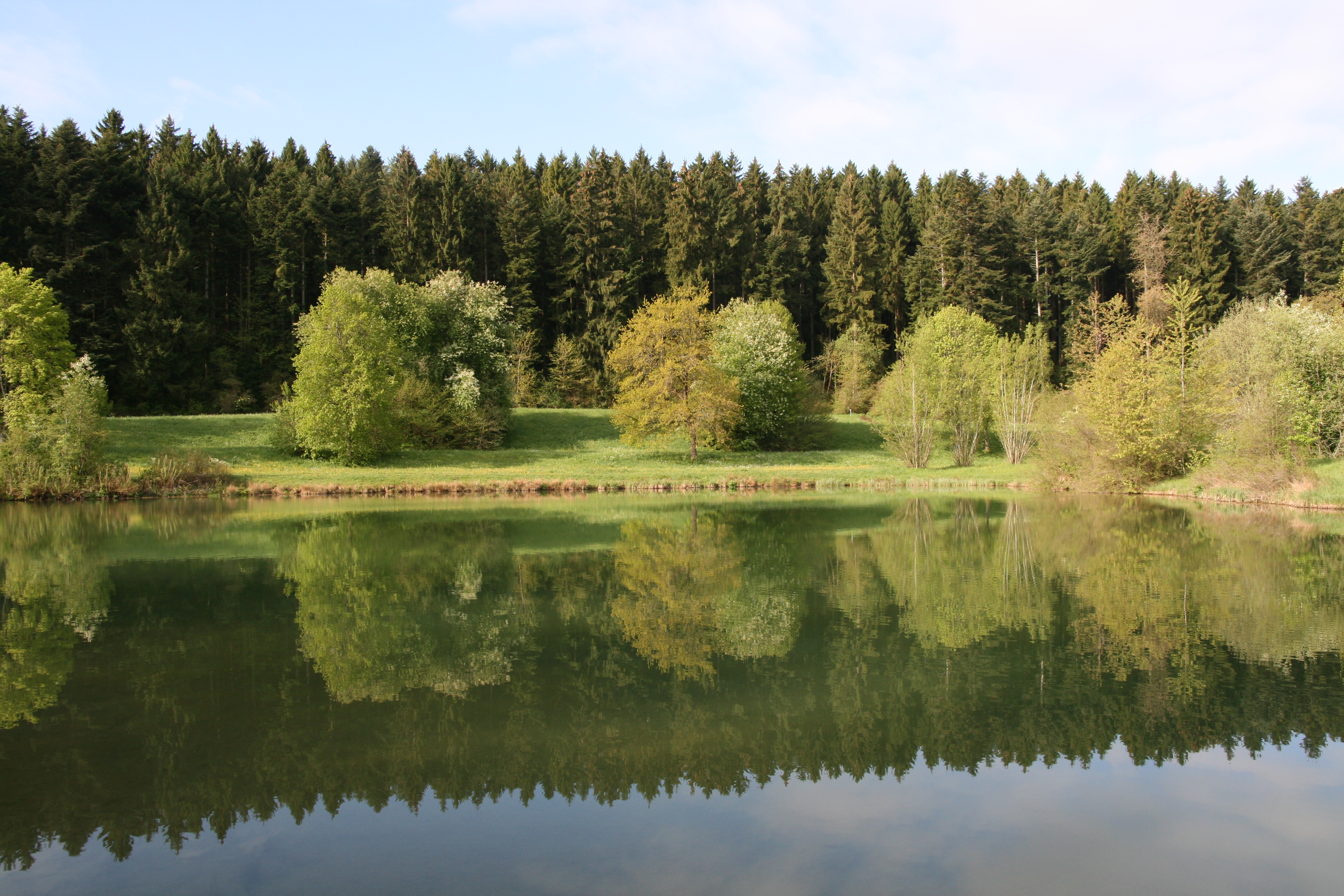

Location
- Country: Germany
- State: Baden-Württemberg

Physical characteristics
- Mouth
  - location: Nagold
  - coordinates: 48.5513°N 8.7214°E
- Length: 24.5 km (15.2 mi)

Basin features
- Progression: Nagold→ Enz→ Neckar→ Rhine→ North Sea

The Waldach is a river of Baden-Württemberg, southwestern Germany. The 24.5 kilometer long Waldach is a right tributary of the river Nagold in the town Nagold.
