= Waldeck Castle (Black Forest) =

Castle ruins in Baden-Württemberg, Germany

Coordinates: 48°40′20.28″N 8°44′15″E

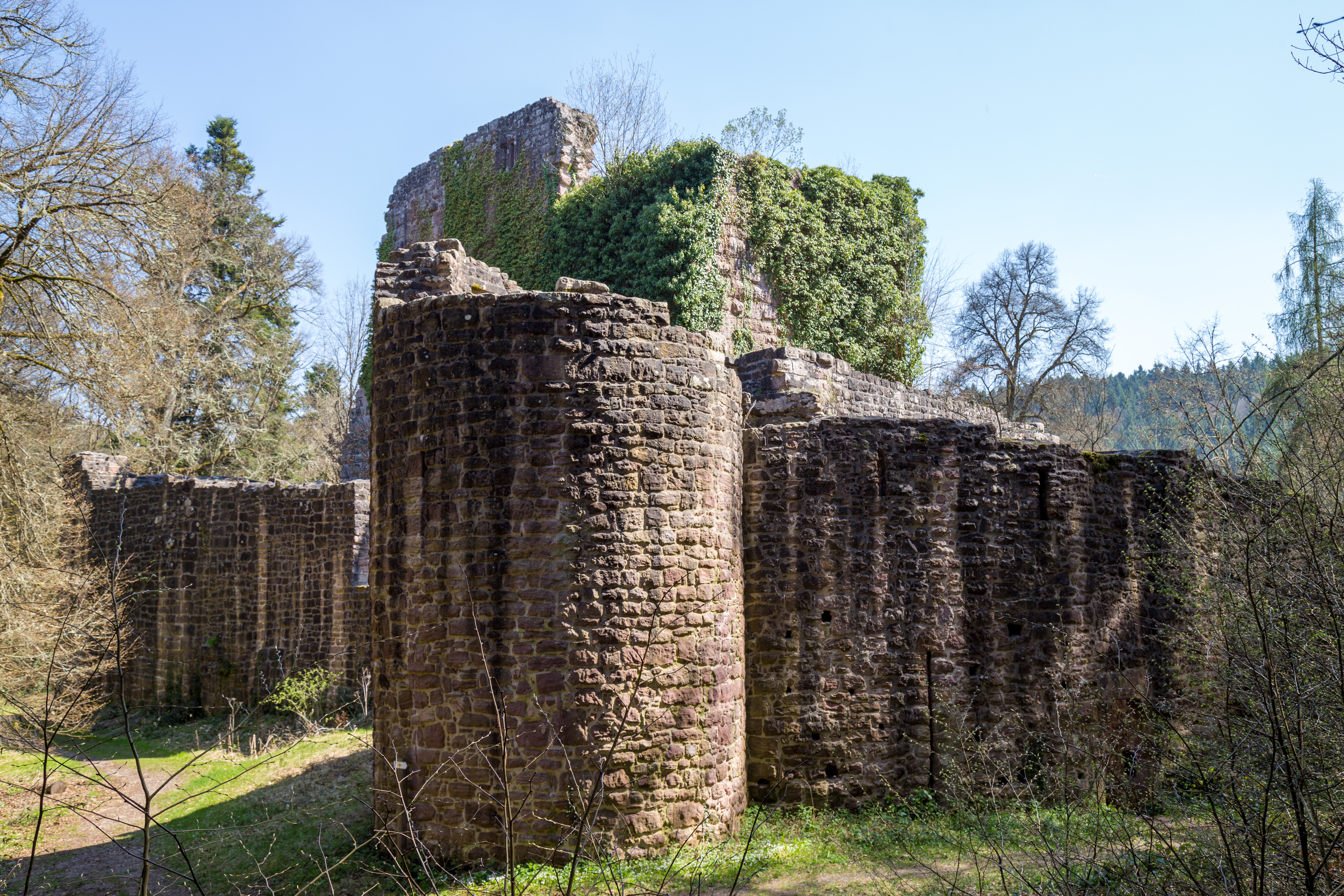
Ruined Waldeck Castle near Calw in the Black Forest

The Ruins of Waldeck, a spur castle, are located above the river Nagold near the town of Calw in Baden-Württemberg, Germany. The castle was once seat of the noble Waldeck family. It was first referenced in 1140, however its exact origins are not well recorded.

The ruins today are within the Black Forest, and the forest has partly covered the site. However a well-defined structure still remains, with the inside of Waldeck being accessible by foot.
