= Altensteig =

Town in Baden-Württemberg, Germany

- Town
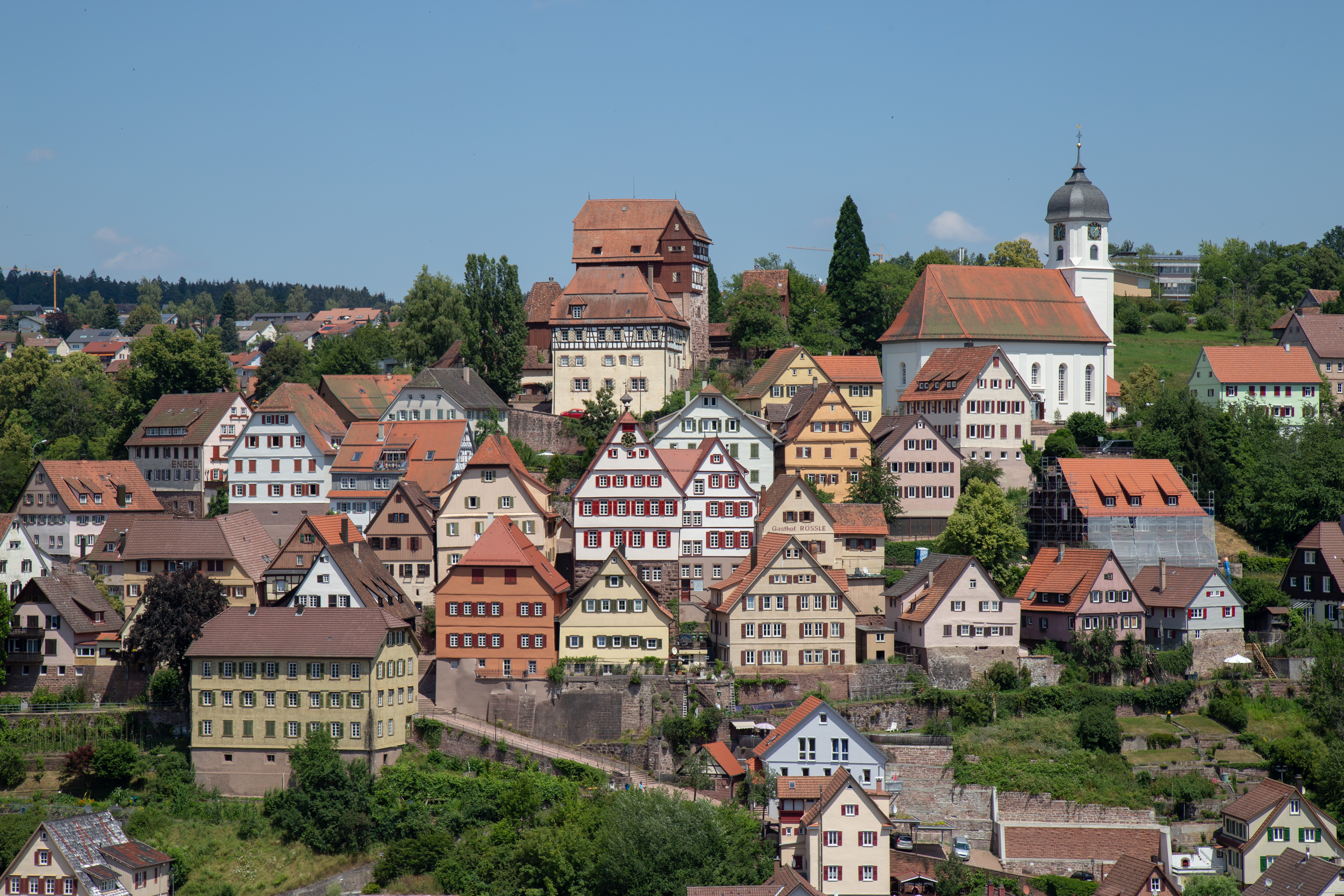
- Altensteig Altstadt, June 2018

- Coat of arms

- Location of Altensteig within Calw district
- Interactive map of Altensteig
- Location within Germany Location within Baden-Württemberg
- Coordinates: 48°35′11″N 8°36′17″E
- Country: Germany
- State: Baden-Württemberg
- Admin. region: Karlsruhe
- District: Calw

Area
  - Total: 53.19 km^{2} (20.54 sq mi)
- Elevation: 504 m (1,654 ft)

Population (2025-12-31)
  - Total: 10,849
  - Density: 204.0/km^{2} (528.3/sq mi)
- Time zone: UTC+01:00 (CET)
  - Summer (DST): UTC+02:00 (CEST)
- Dialling codes: 07453
- Vehicle registration: CW
- Website: www.altensteig.de

Altensteig (German pronunciation: [ˈaltn̩ʃtaɪk]; Swabian: Aldaschdaeg) is a town in the Calw district of German state of Baden-Württemberg.

== History ==
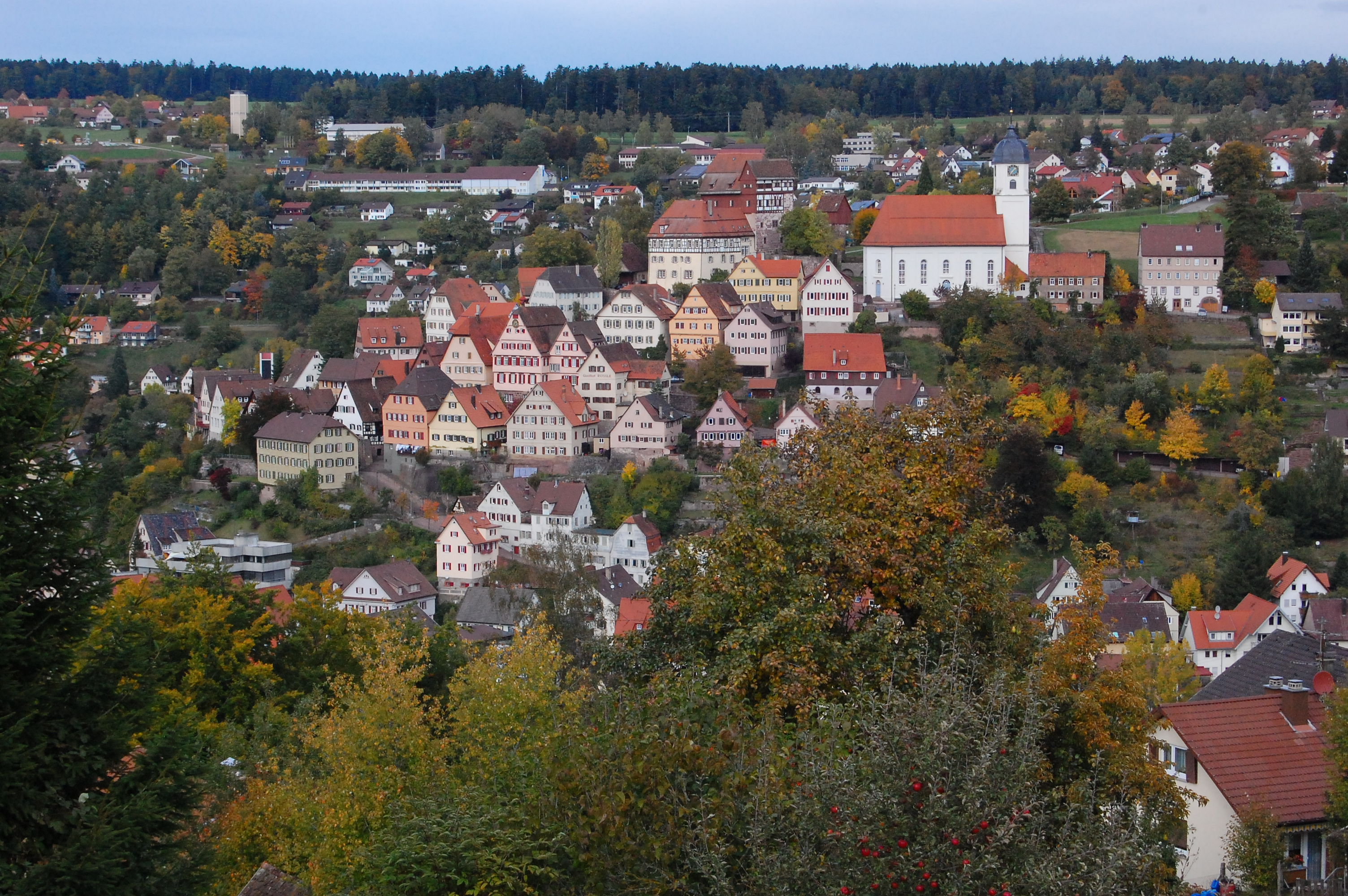

Altensteig was most likely given town rights by the Counts of Hohenberg around the middle of the 14th century. In 1398, the town became a possession of the Margraviate of Baden and then of the Duchy of Württemberg in 1603. Altensteig was made the seat of its own district, which was reorganized in 1808 as Oberamt Altensteig, which was dissolved two years later and resulted in Altensteig being assigned to Oberamt Nagold. That district, too, was dissolved in 1938 and Altensteig was assigned to the newly-organized Calw district.

== Geography ==
The city (Stadt) of Simmersfeld is located at the south-western edge of the district of Calw. It lies along the border with the district of Freudenstadt to the south and west. Altensteig's municipal area is located mostly in the Black Forest, though a portion of its eastern mass lies in the Upper Gäu. Elevation above sea level in the municipal area ranges from a high of 747 meters (2,451 ft) Normalnull (NN) to a low of 421 meters (1,381 ft) NN.

Portions of the Federally protected Egenhäuser Kapf at Bömbachtal, Köllbach valley, and Schmalzmisse nature reserves are located in Altensteig's municipal area.

== Politics ==
Altensteig has nine boroughs: Altensteig, Altensteigdorf, Berneck, Garrweiler, Hornberg, Spielberg, Überberg, Walddorg, Wart. There are also 15 villages in the municipal area: Bahnhof Berneck, Baiermühle, Bruderhaus, Chausseehaus, Elektrizitätswerk, Fischhaus, Heselbronn, Internationales Forum Burg Hornberg, Kohlsägmühle, Lengenloch, Lohmühle, Monhardt, Trögelsbach, Ziegelhütte, Zumweiler.

=== Coat of arms ===
The municipal coat of arms of Altensteig shows a castle in red and white, upon a field of yellow and below a black stag antler, atop a green mountain approached by a yellow road. This coat of arms first appeared on a town seal in 1604, and was modified in 1935 with the addition of the stag antler to reference Württemberg. The winding path refers to the German word Steige, or "path", and to the name Altensteig.

== Transportation ==
Altensteig is connected to Germany's network of roadways by Bundesstraße 28. The city was also connected by rail via the Nagold-Altensteig narrow gauge railway from 1891 until its shutdown in 1967. Local public transportation is provided by the Verkehrsgesellschaft Bäderkreis Calw.
