= Pfalzgrafenweiler =

- Municipality
- Coat of arms

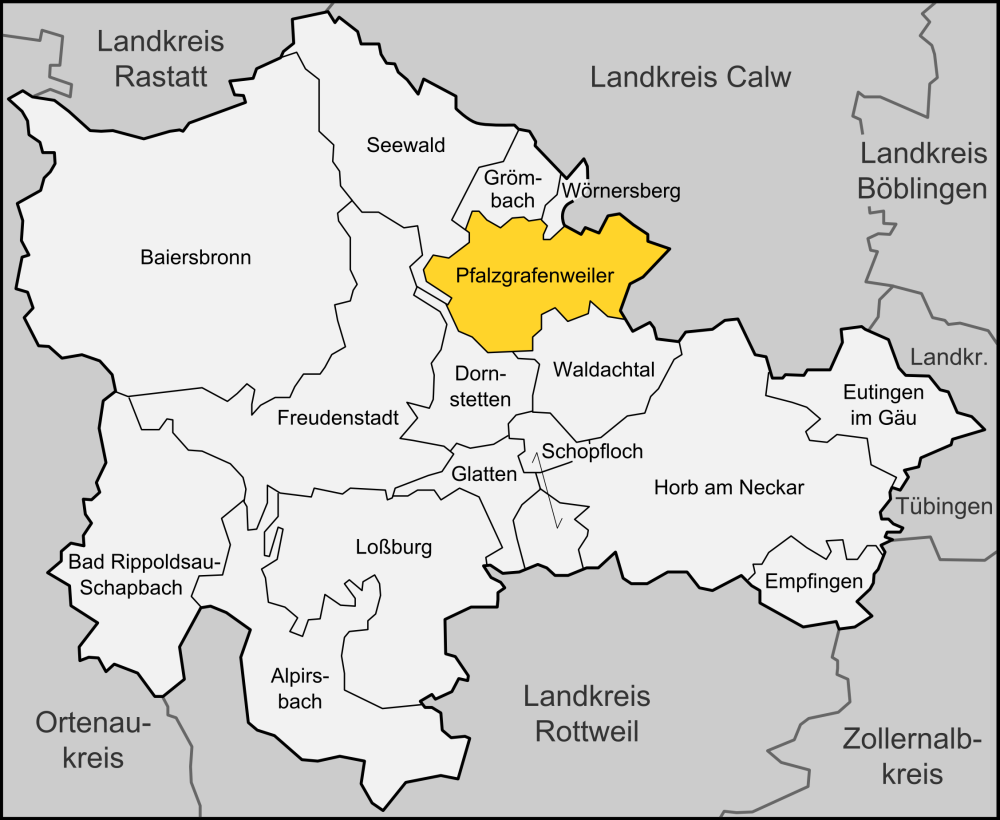
- Location of Pfalzgrafenweiler within Freudenstadt district
- Interactive map of Pfalzgrafenweiler
- Location within Germany Location within Baden-Württemberg
- Coordinates: 48°31′42″N 8°34′4″E
- Country: Germany
- State: Baden-Württemberg
- Admin. region: Karlsruhe
- District: Freudenstadt

Government
  - Mayor (2023–31): Dieter Bischoff

Area
  - Total: 44.72 km^{2} (17.27 sq mi)
- Elevation: 636 m (2,087 ft)

Population (2025-12-31)
  - Total: 7,222
  - Density: 161.5/km^{2} (418.3/sq mi)
- Time zone: UTC+01:00 (CET)
  - Summer (DST): UTC+02:00 (CEST)
- Postal codes: 72285
- Dialling codes: 07445
- Vehicle registration: FDS, HCH, HOR, WOL
- Website: www.pfalzgrafenweiler.de

Pfalzgrafenweiler (Swabian: Pfalzgrofeweiler) is a municipality in the district of Freudenstadt in Baden-Württemberg in southern Germany.

The Counts of Tübingen had a large castle located at Pfalzgrafenweiler in the 13th and 14th centuries. Between 1972 and 1975, the municipalities of Bösingen, Durrweiler, Edelweiler, Herzogsweiler, and Kälberbronn were added to Pfalzgrafenweiler.

== Sister city ==
- La Loupe, Eure et Loir, France
