= Grömbach =

- Municipality
- Coat of arms

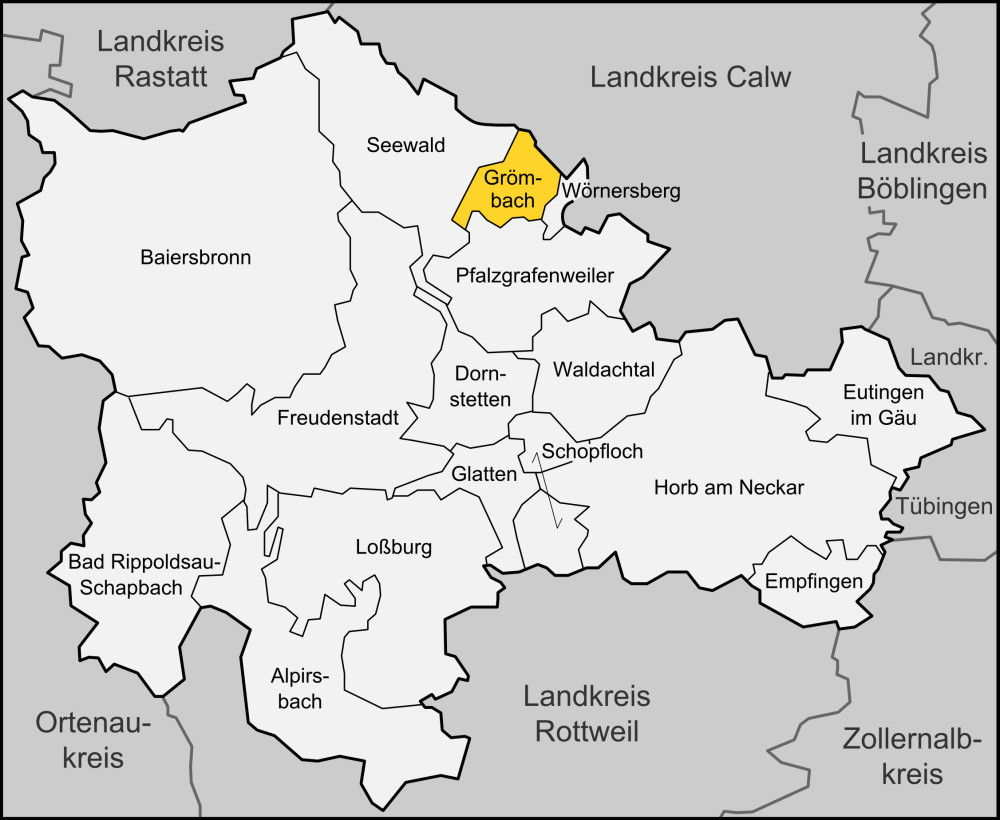
- Location of Grömbach within Freudenstadt district
- Interactive map of Grömbach
- Location within Germany Location within Baden-Württemberg
- Coordinates: 48°34′18″N 8°32′47″E
- Country: Germany
- State: Baden-Württemberg
- Admin. region: Karlsruhe
- District: Freudenstadt

Government
  - Mayor (2022–30): Daniel Wolber

Area
  - Total: 12.18 km^{2} (4.70 sq mi)
- Elevation: 634 m (2,080 ft)

Population (2025-12-31)
  - Total: 638
  - Density: 52.4/km^{2} (136/sq mi)
- Time zone: UTC+01:00 (CET)
  - Summer (DST): UTC+02:00 (CEST)
- Postal codes: 72294, 72297
- Dialling codes: 07453
- Vehicle registration: FDS, HCH, HOR, WOL
- Website: www.groembach.de

Grömbach is a municipality in the district of Freudenstadt in Baden-Württemberg in southern Germany.
