= Seewald =

- Municipality
- Coat of arms

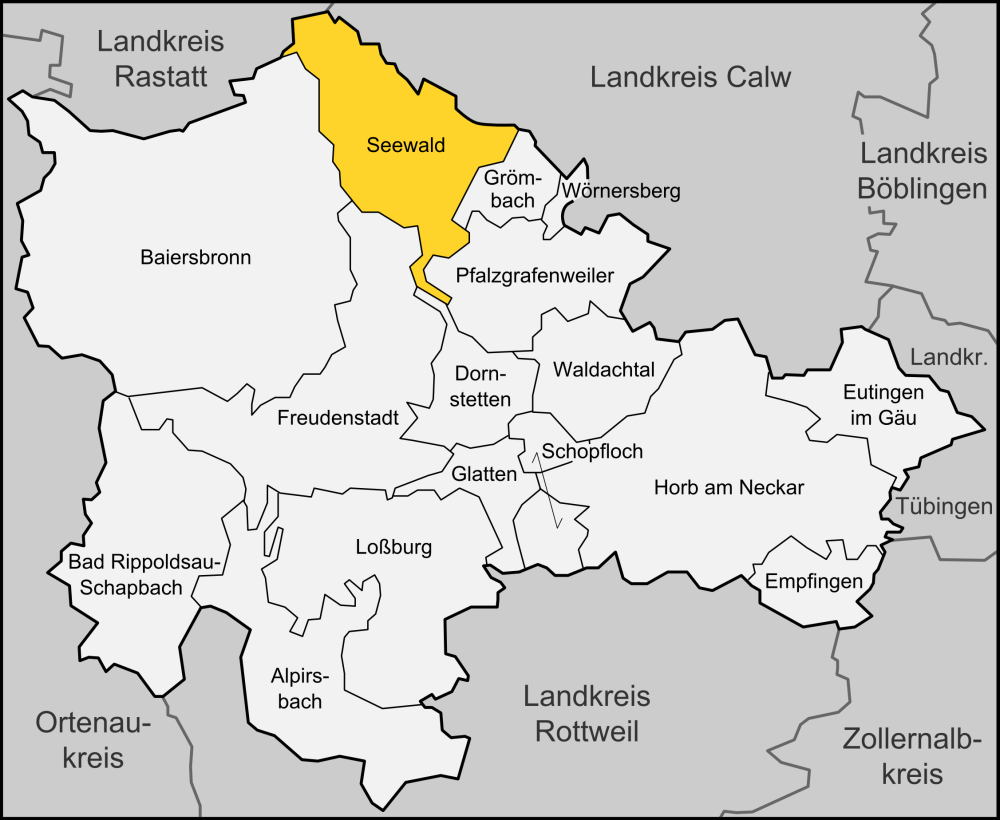
- Location of Seewald within Freudenstadt district
- Interactive map of Seewald
- Location within Germany Location within Baden-Württemberg
- Coordinates: 48°35′38″N 8°25′15″E
- Country: Germany
- State: Baden-Württemberg
- Admin. region: Karlsruhe
- District: Freudenstadt

Government
  - Mayor (2023–31): Dominic Damrath

Area
  - Total: 58.49 km^{2} (22.58 sq mi)
- Elevation: 782 m (2,566 ft)

Population (2025-12-31)
  - Total: 2,092
  - Density: 35.77/km^{2} (92.64/sq mi)
- Time zone: UTC+01:00 (CET)
  - Summer (DST): UTC+02:00 (CEST)
- Postal codes: 72297
- Dialling codes: 07447, 07448
- Vehicle registration: FDS, HCH, HOR, WOL
- Website: www.seewald.eu

Seewald (German pronunciation: [ˈzeːvalt]) is a municipality in the Freudenstadt district in Baden-Württemberg in southern Germany. It lies in the Black Forest. The source of the river Nagold is situated in the municipality. There is a dam in the river near the village Erzgrube, forming the artificial lake Nagoldsee. Erzgrube lies 550 m (1,804 ft) above sea level. Other subdivisions lie between 750 and 850 m (2,461 and 2,789 ft) above sea level in the midst of the forests. 90% of the area is covered with forests.

== Politics ==
Seewald is a bastion of the Party of Bible-abiding Christians (PBC), who, in the 2005 national elections, received 5,0% of the vote in Seewald compared to 0,2% nationally.

== Subdivisions ==
- Allmandle
- Besenfeld
- Eisenbach
- Erzgrube
- Göttelfingen
- Hochdorf
- Schernbach

== Transportation ==
Seewald is connected by the national road B 294 ( Bretten - Freiburg ) to the national road network.

== Education ==
Seewald has its own primary school in the district Besenfeld. The School enrollment is done in Freudenstadt. In Besenfeld there is also a municipal kindergarten, while in Gottelfingen is an evangelical kindergarten.

== Things ==
The district Besenfeld lies at the middle ground, a distance hiking trail, which passes by many sights. The entire community has a large network of bicycle and hiking trails. In winter, many kilometers of trails are groomed. Besenfeld is connected via ski track to Kaltenbronn and Freudenstadt. Several snowshoe trails are signposted, which can be used as a Nordic walking route in the summer. In addition, located in the district of Erzgrube Nagoldtalstausee which attracts thousands of visitors especially during the summer months and thus ranks among the biggest attractions in Northern Black Forest. The lake dams the springing in the district Urnagold River Nagold to a length of about three kilometers. Since May 2008, the municipality operates a quiet grove, a forest cemetery for alternative forms of burial under trees and glades.
