= Bad Teinach-Zavelstein =

German municipality

- Town
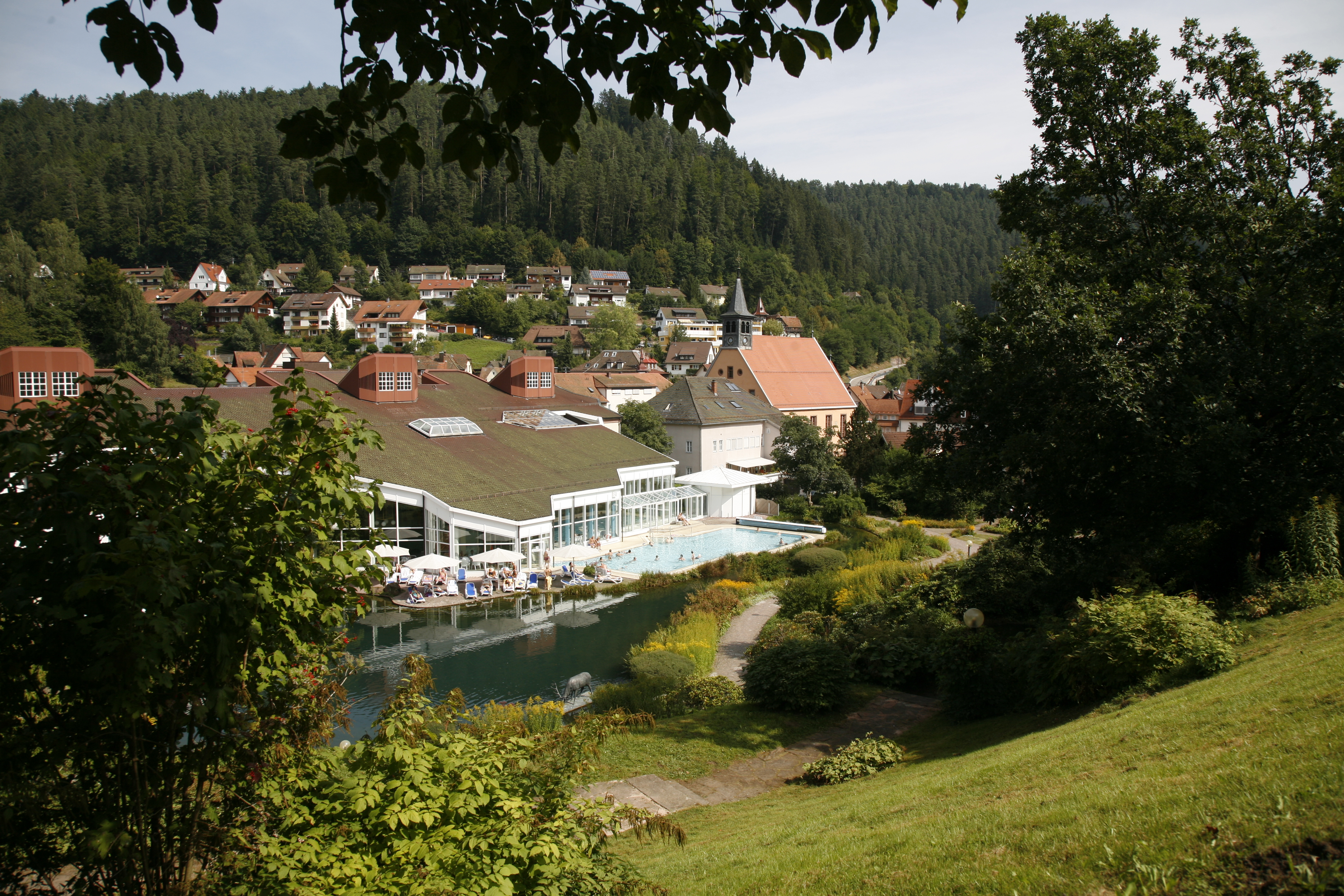
- Bad Teinach, October 2012

- Coat of arms

- Location of Bad Teinach-Zavelstein within Calw district
- Interactive map of Bad Teinach-Zavelstein
- Location within Germany Location within Baden-Württemberg
- Coordinates: 48°41′18″N 8°41′17″E
- Country: Germany
- State: Baden-Württemberg
- Admin. region: Karlsruhe
- District: Calw

Government
  - Mayor (2023–31): Markus Wendel

Area
  - Total: 25.17 km^{2} (9.72 sq mi)
- Elevation: 391–650 m (1,283–2,133 ft)

Population (2025-12-31)
  - Total: 3,217
  - Density: 127.8/km^{2} (331.0/sq mi)
- Time zone: UTC+01:00 (CET)
  - Summer (DST): UTC+02:00 (CEST)
- Postal codes: 75385
- Dialling codes: 07053
- Vehicle registration: CW
- Website: www.bad-teinach-zavelstein.de

Bad Teinach-Zavelstein (German pronunciation: [baːt ˈtaɪnax ˈtsaːvl̩ˌʃtaɪn]) is a town in the district of Calw, in Baden-Württemberg, Germany.

== History ==
The township of Bad Teinach-Zavelstein was formed on 1 January 1975 by the merging of Bad Teinach, Zavelstein, and the towns of Emberg, Rötenbach, Schmieh, and Sommenhardt.

== Geography ==
The township (Stadt) of Bad Teinach-Zavelstein is located at the center of the district of Calw, in Baden-Württemberg, one of the 16 States of the Federal Republic of Germany. Bad Teinach-Zavelstein's municipal area rests upon the plateau of the Enz and Nagold rivers, a landscape defined by severe river erosion, in the greater Black Forest region. Elevation above sea level in the municipal area ranges from a high of 747 meters (2,451 ft) Normalnull (NN) to a low of 337 meters (1,106 ft) NN.

A portion of the Federally protected Zavelstein crocus meadows nature reserve is located in Bad Teinach-Zavelstein's municipal area.

== Politics ==
Bad Teinach-Zavelstein has six boroughs, Bad Teinach, Emberg, Rötenbach, Schmieh, Sommenhardt, and Zavelstein, and five villages, Kentheim, Kollwanger Sägmühle, Lützenhardt, Teinachtal, Wilhelmshöhe.

=== Coat of arms ===
Bad Teinach-Zavelstein's municipal coat of arms is divided party per fess into an upper field of yellow with three black stag antlers, and a lower field of five yellow and red squares in a checkerboard pattern. The checkboard pattern is an archaic reference to the name Zavelstein using the word zabel, and the stag antlers are taken from the Coat of arms of Württemberg. This coat of arms was awarded by the Calw district office to Bad Teinach-Zavelstein with an accompanying municipal flag on 13 February 1981.

== Transportation ==
Bad Teinach-Zavelstein is connected to Germany's network of roadways by the Bundesstraße 463 and to its rail system by the Nagold Valley Railway. Local public transportation is provided by the Verkehrsgesellschaft Bäderkreis Calw.
