= Freudenstadt (district) =

Coordinates: 48°30′N 8°25′E

- District
- Flag Coat of arms
- Country: Germany
- State: Baden-Württemberg
- Adm. region: Karlsruhe
- Capital: Freudenstadt

Government
  - District admin.: Klaus Michael Rückert (CDU)

Area
  - Total: 870.68 km^{2} (336.17 sq mi)

Population (31 December 2024)
  - Total: 121,958
  - Density: 140.07/km^{2} (362.79/sq mi)
- Time zone: UTC+01:00 (CET)
  - Summer (DST): UTC+02:00 (CEST)
- Vehicle registration: FDS
- Website: www.landkreis-freudenstadt.de

Freudenstadt is a Landkreis (district) in the middle of Baden-Württemberg, Germany. Neighboring districts are (from north clockwise) Rastatt, Calw, Tübingen, Zollernalbkreis, Rottweil and the Ortenaukreis.

== History ==
The district was created in 1938 as the successor of the Oberamt Freudenstadt which dated back to 1806. In 1973 it was merged with the majority of the neighboring district of Horb, and some small parts of the districts of Wolfach and Hechingen.

== Geography ==
The district is located in the middle part of the Black Forest mountains. The river Neckar flows through the southeast of the district.

== Coat of arms ==
The coat of arms displays a capercaillie, which once was quite common in the area. The colors yellow and black are chosen as they are the colors of Württemberg.

== Towns and municipalities ==
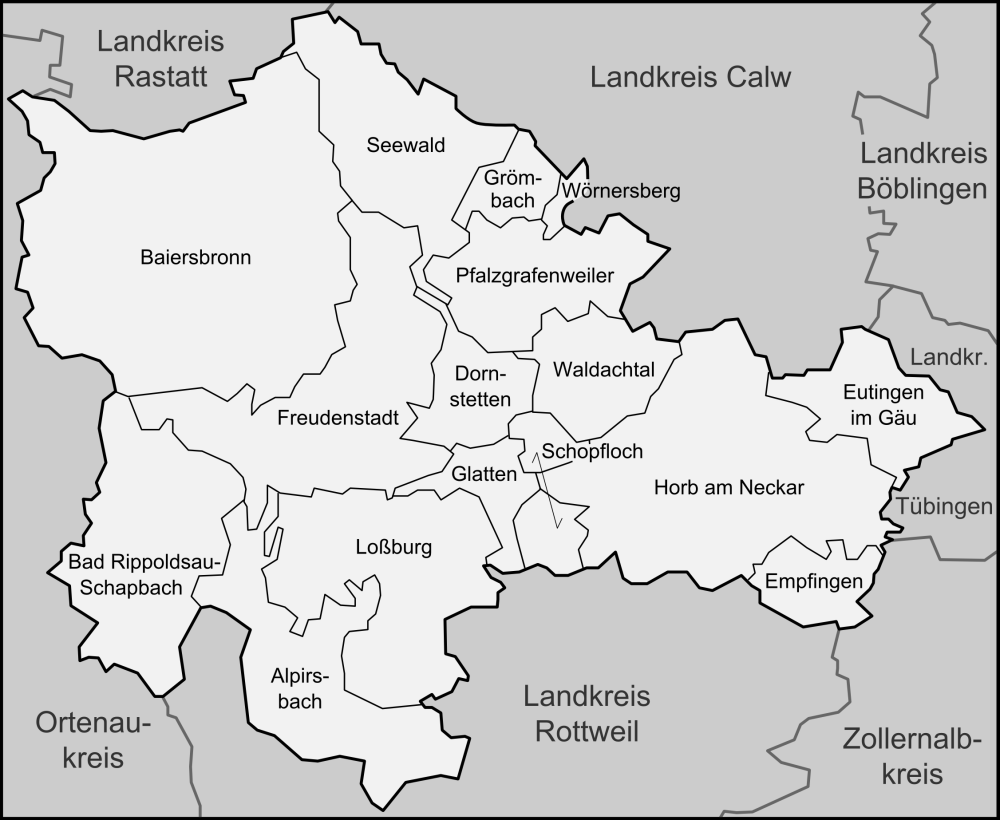
Clickable map of towns and municipalities in the district

Towns	Municipalities
1. Alpirsbach; 2. Dornstetten; 3. Freudenstadt; 4. Horb am Neckar	1. Bad Rippoldsau-Schapbach; 2. Baiersbronn; 3. Empfingen; 4. Eutingen im Gäu; 5. Glatten; 6. Grömbach; 7. Loßburg; 8. Pfalzgrafenweiler; 9. Schopfloch; 10. Seewald; 11. Waldachtal; 12. Wörnersberg
Administrative districts	1. Bad Rippoldsau-Schapbach; 2. Baiersbronn; 3. Empfingen; 4. Eutingen im Gäu; 5. Glatten; 6. Grömbach; 7. Loßburg; 8. Pfalzgrafenweiler; 9. Schopfloch; 10. Seewald; 11. Waldachtal; 12. Wörnersberg
1. Dornstetten; 2. Freudenstadt; 3. Horb; 4. Loßburg; 5. Pfalzgrafenweiler	1. Bad Rippoldsau-Schapbach; 2. Baiersbronn; 3. Empfingen; 4. Eutingen im Gäu; 5. Glatten; 6. Grömbach; 7. Loßburg; 8. Pfalzgrafenweiler; 9. Schopfloch; 10. Seewald; 11. Waldachtal; 12. Wörnersberg
