= Emmendingen – Lahr =

Federal electoral district of Germany

283 Emmendingen – Lahr
- Electoral district for the Bundestag
- Emmendingen – Lahr in 2025
- State: Baden-Württemberg
- Population: 298,200 (2019)
- Electorate: 218,872 (2021)
- Major settlements: Lahr; Emmendingen; Waldkirch
- Area: 1,204.2 km^{2}

Current electoral district
- Created: 1949
- Party: CDU
- Member: Yannick Bury
- Elected: 2021, 2025

Emmendingen – Lahr is an electoral constituency (German: Wahlkreis) represented in the Bundestag. It elects one member via first-past-the-post voting. Under the current constituency numbering system, it is designated as constituency 283. It is located in southwestern Baden-Württemberg, comprising the Emmendingen district and the southern part of the Ortenaukreis district.

Emmendingen – Lahr was created for the inaugural 1949 federal election. Since 2021, it has been represented by Yannick Bury of the Christian Democratic Union (CDU).

== Geography ==
Emmendingen – Lahr is located in southwestern Baden-Württemberg. As of the 2021 federal election, it comprises the Emmendingen district and the municipalities of Ettenheim, Fischerbach, Friesenheim, Haslach im Kinzigtal, Hofstetten, Kappel-Grafenhausen, Kippenheim, Lahr/Schwarzwald, Mahlberg, Meißenheim, Mühlenbach, Ringsheim, Rust, Schuttertal, Schwanau, Seelbach, and Steinach from the Ortenaukreis district.

== History ==
Emmendingen – Lahr was created in 1949, then known as Emmendingen. In the 1965 through 1976 elections, it was named Emmendingen – Wolfach. It acquired its current name in the 1980 election. In the 1949 election, it was Baden constituency 5 in the numbering system. In the 1953 through 1961 elections, it was number 187. In the 1965 through 1976 elections, it was number 191. In the 1980 through 1998 elections, it was number 187. In the 2002 and 2005 elections, it was number 284. Since the 2009 election, it has been number 283.

Originally, the constituency comprised the districts of Emmendingen, Wolfach, and Villingen. In the 1965 through 1976 elections, it comprised the Emmendingen and Wolfach districts. In the 1980 election, it acquired a configuration similar to its current borders, but including the municipalities of Gutach, Hausach, Hornberg, Oberwolfach, and Wolfach. It acquired its current borders in the 2002 election.

Election	No.	Name	Borders
1949	5	Emmendingen	Emmendingen district; Wolfach district; Villingen district
1953	187	Emmendingen	Emmendingen district; Wolfach district; Villingen district
1957	187	Emmendingen	Emmendingen district; Wolfach district; Villingen district
1961	187	Emmendingen	Emmendingen district; Wolfach district; Villingen district
1965	191	Emmendingen – Wolfach	Emmendingen district; Wolfach district
1969	191	Emmendingen – Wolfach	Emmendingen district; Wolfach district
1972	191	Emmendingen – Wolfach	Emmendingen district; Wolfach district
1976	191	Emmendingen – Wolfach	Emmendingen district; Wolfach district
1980	187	Emmendingen – Lahr	Emmendingen district; Ortenaukreis district (only Ettenheim, Fischerbach, Friesenheim, Haslach im Kinzigtal, Hofstetten, Kappel-Grafenhausen, Kippenheim, Lahr/Schwarzwald, Mahlberg, Meißenheim, Mühlenbach, Ringsheim, Rust, Schuttertal, Schwanau, Seelbach, Steinach, Gutach, Hausach, Hornberg, Oberwolfach, and Wolfach municipalities)
1983	187	Emmendingen – Lahr	Emmendingen district; Ortenaukreis district (only Ettenheim, Fischerbach, Friesenheim, Haslach im Kinzigtal, Hofstetten, Kappel-Grafenhausen, Kippenheim, Lahr/Schwarzwald, Mahlberg, Meißenheim, Mühlenbach, Ringsheim, Rust, Schuttertal, Schwanau, Seelbach, Steinach, Gutach, Hausach, Hornberg, Oberwolfach, and Wolfach municipalities)
1987	187	Emmendingen – Lahr	Emmendingen district; Ortenaukreis district (only Ettenheim, Fischerbach, Friesenheim, Haslach im Kinzigtal, Hofstetten, Kappel-Grafenhausen, Kippenheim, Lahr/Schwarzwald, Mahlberg, Meißenheim, Mühlenbach, Ringsheim, Rust, Schuttertal, Schwanau, Seelbach, Steinach, Gutach, Hausach, Hornberg, Oberwolfach, and Wolfach municipalities)
1990	187	Emmendingen – Lahr	Emmendingen district; Ortenaukreis district (only Ettenheim, Fischerbach, Friesenheim, Haslach im Kinzigtal, Hofstetten, Kappel-Grafenhausen, Kippenheim, Lahr/Schwarzwald, Mahlberg, Meißenheim, Mühlenbach, Ringsheim, Rust, Schuttertal, Schwanau, Seelbach, Steinach, Gutach, Hausach, Hornberg, Oberwolfach, and Wolfach municipalities)
1994	187	Emmendingen – Lahr	Emmendingen district; Ortenaukreis district (only Ettenheim, Fischerbach, Friesenheim, Haslach im Kinzigtal, Hofstetten, Kappel-Grafenhausen, Kippenheim, Lahr/Schwarzwald, Mahlberg, Meißenheim, Mühlenbach, Ringsheim, Rust, Schuttertal, Schwanau, Seelbach, Steinach, Gutach, Hausach, Hornberg, Oberwolfach, and Wolfach municipalities)
1998	187	Emmendingen – Lahr	Emmendingen district; Ortenaukreis district (only Ettenheim, Fischerbach, Friesenheim, Haslach im Kinzigtal, Hofstetten, Kappel-Grafenhausen, Kippenheim, Lahr/Schwarzwald, Mahlberg, Meißenheim, Mühlenbach, Ringsheim, Rust, Schuttertal, Schwanau, Seelbach, Steinach, Gutach, Hausach, Hornberg, Oberwolfach, and Wolfach municipalities)
2002	284	Emmendingen – Lahr	Emmendingen district; Ortenaukreis district (only Ettenheim, Fischerbach, Friesenheim, Haslach im Kinzigtal, Hofstetten, Kappel-Grafenhausen, Kippenheim, Lahr/Schwarzwald, Mahlberg, Meißenheim, Mühlenbach, Ringsheim, Rust, Schuttertal, Schwanau, Seelbach, and Steinach municipalities)
2005	284	Emmendingen – Lahr	Emmendingen district; Ortenaukreis district (only Ettenheim, Fischerbach, Friesenheim, Haslach im Kinzigtal, Hofstetten, Kappel-Grafenhausen, Kippenheim, Lahr/Schwarzwald, Mahlberg, Meißenheim, Mühlenbach, Ringsheim, Rust, Schuttertal, Schwanau, Seelbach, and Steinach municipalities)
2009	283	Emmendingen – Lahr	Emmendingen district; Ortenaukreis district (only Ettenheim, Fischerbach, Friesenheim, Haslach im Kinzigtal, Hofstetten, Kappel-Grafenhausen, Kippenheim, Lahr/Schwarzwald, Mahlberg, Meißenheim, Mühlenbach, Ringsheim, Rust, Schuttertal, Schwanau, Seelbach, and Steinach municipalities)
2013	283	Emmendingen – Lahr	Emmendingen district; Ortenaukreis district (only Ettenheim, Fischerbach, Friesenheim, Haslach im Kinzigtal, Hofstetten, Kappel-Grafenhausen, Kippenheim, Lahr/Schwarzwald, Mahlberg, Meißenheim, Mühlenbach, Ringsheim, Rust, Schuttertal, Schwanau, Seelbach, and Steinach municipalities)
2017	283	Emmendingen – Lahr	Emmendingen district; Ortenaukreis district (only Ettenheim, Fischerbach, Friesenheim, Haslach im Kinzigtal, Hofstetten, Kappel-Grafenhausen, Kippenheim, Lahr/Schwarzwald, Mahlberg, Meißenheim, Mühlenbach, Ringsheim, Rust, Schuttertal, Schwanau, Seelbach, and Steinach municipalities)
2021	283	Emmendingen – Lahr	Emmendingen district; Ortenaukreis district (only Ettenheim, Fischerbach, Friesenheim, Haslach im Kinzigtal, Hofstetten, Kappel-Grafenhausen, Kippenheim, Lahr/Schwarzwald, Mahlberg, Meißenheim, Mühlenbach, Ringsheim, Rust, Schuttertal, Schwanau, Seelbach, and Steinach municipalities)
2025	283	Emmendingen – Lahr	Emmendingen district; Ortenaukreis district (only Ettenheim, Fischerbach, Friesenheim, Haslach im Kinzigtal, Hofstetten, Kappel-Grafenhausen, Kippenheim, Lahr/Schwarzwald, Mahlberg, Meißenheim, Mühlenbach, Ringsheim, Rust, Schuttertal, Schwanau, Seelbach, and Steinach municipalities)

== Members ==
The constituency has been held continuously by Christian Democratic Union (CDU) since its creation. It was first represented by Heinrich Höfler from 1949 to 1965, followed by Albert Burger from 1965 to 1983. Rainer Haungs was representative from 1983 to 1998. Peter Weiß was elected in 1998 and served until 2021. He was succeeded by Yannick Bury.

Election	Member	Party	%
1949	Heinrich Höfler	CDU	52.8
1953	Heinrich Höfler	CDU	60.9
1957	Heinrich Höfler	CDU	58.4
1961	Heinrich Höfler	CDU	49.5
1965	Albert Burger	CDU	54.8
1969	Albert Burger	CDU	56.0
1972	Albert Burger	CDU	55.9
1976	Albert Burger	CDU	56.9
1980	Albert Burger	CDU	51.2
1983	Rainer Haungs	CDU	56.1
1987	Rainer Haungs	CDU	49.4
1990	Rainer Haungs	CDU	50.8
1994	Rainer Haungs	CDU	48.0
1998	Peter Weiß	CDU	41.8
2002	Peter Weiß	CDU	45.5
2005	Peter Weiß	CDU	44.9
2009	Peter Weiß	CDU	42.1
2013	Peter Weiß	CDU	52.3
2017	Peter Weiß	CDU	37.6
2021	Yannick Bury	CDU	27.8
2025	Yannick Bury	CDU	37.0

== Election results ==
=== 2025 election ===
Federal election (2025): Emmendingen – Lahr
Notes:	Blue background denotes the winner of the electorate vote. Pink background denotes a candidate elected from their party list. Yellow background denotes an electorate win by a list member, or other incumbent. A ✓ or ✗ denotes status of any incumbent, win or lose respectively.						
Party	Candidate	Votes	%	±%	Party votes	%	±%
CDU	✓ Yannick Bury	66,980	37.0	▲9.2	58,417	32.2	▲7.4
SPD	Johannes Fechner	40,198	22.2	▼5.6	28,144	15.5	▼8.3
AfD	Michael Blos	34,276	19.0	▲10.3	35,303	19.5	▲10.5
Greens	Susanne Floß	18,327	10.1	▼3.9	23,990	13.1	▼4.2
Left	Amelie Quotadamo	8,518	4.7	▲1.8	10,694	5.9	▲2.8
FW	Christina Hesse	6,875	3.8	▲1.4	3,352	1.8	0.0
FDP	Eileen Lerche	5,693	3.1	▼6.8	8,496	4.7	▼8.6
BSW					7,310	4.0	
Tierschutzpartei				▼2.2	2,073	1.1	▼0.7
Volt				▼0.4	1,229	0.7	▲0.3
PARTEI				▼1.2	880	0.5	▼0.4
dieBasis				▼2.0	509	0.3	▼1.6
ÖDP				▼0.7	391	0.2	▼0.2
Bündnis C					284	0.2	Steady
BD					193	0.1	
MLPD					44	0.0	0.0
Pirates							▼0.3
Team Todenhöfer							▼0.3
Gesundheitsforschung							▼0.1
Humanists							▼0.1
Informal votes		1,463			1,021		
Total valid votes		180,867			181,309		
Turnout		182,330	83.3	▲6.6			
CDU hold	Majority	26,782	14.8	▲9.2			

=== 2021 election ===
Federal election (2021): Emmendingen – Lahr
Notes:	Blue background denotes the winner of the electorate vote. Pink background denotes a candidate elected from their party list. Yellow background denotes an electorate win by a list member, or other incumbent. A ✓ or ✗ denotes status of any incumbent, win or lose respectively.						
Party	Candidate	Votes	%	±%	Party votes	%	±%
CDU	Yannick Bury	46,406	27.8	▼9.7	41,323	24.8	▼11.1
SPD	Johannes Fechner	46,316	27.8	▲4.1	39,727	23.8	▲6.0
Greens	Heike Dorow	23,345	14.0	▲2.9	28,724	17.2	▲3.5
FDP	Tino Ritter	16,620	10.0	▲1.4	22,136	13.3	▲2.7
AfD	Thomas Seitz	14,396	8.6	▼2.2	14,971	9.0	▼2.5
Left	Imke Pirch	4,921	3.0	▼2.3	5,209	3.1	▼2.6
FW	Matthias Stulz	3,963	2.4		3,146	1.9	▲1.1
Tierschutzpartei	Jürgen Durke	3,601	2.2	▲0.2	3,122	1.9	▲0.6
dieBasis	Ralph Herschlein	3,325	2.0		3,147	1.9	
PARTEI	Dirk Ruppenthal	1,980	1.2		1,514	0.9	▲0.3
ÖDP	Michael Kefer	1,159	0.7	▼0.3	676	0.4	▼0.2
Pirates					568	0.3	▼0.1
Volt	Milena Schiller-Ninô	623	0.4		553	0.3	
Team Todenhöfer					477	0.3	
Bündnis C					332	0.2	
Gesundheitsforschung					181	0.1	
Bürgerbewegung					169	0.1	
NPD					168	0.1	▼0.1
DiB					168	0.1	0.0
Humanists					120	0.1	
Bündnis 21					64	0.0	
LKR					31	0.0	
DKP					24	0.0	0.0
MLPD					22	0.0	0.0
Informal votes		1,349			1,432		
Total valid votes		166,655			166,572		
Turnout		168,004	76.8	▼0.4			
CDU hold	Majority	90	0.0	▼13.8			

=== 2017 election ===
Federal election (2017): Emmendingen – Lahr
Notes:	Blue background denotes the winner of the electorate vote. Pink background denotes a candidate elected from their party list. Yellow background denotes an electorate win by a list member, or other incumbent. A ✓ or ✗ denotes status of any incumbent, win or lose respectively.						
Party	Candidate	Votes	%	±%	Party votes	%	±%
CDU	✓ Peter Weiß	62,476	37.6	▼14.8	59,784	35.9	▼9.9
SPD	Johannes Fechner	39,472	23.7	▼2.7	29,738	17.9	▼3.4
Greens	Markus Rasp	18,537	11.1	▼0.4	22,806	13.7	▲1.6
AfD	Thomas Seitz	18,027	10.8		19,139	11.5	▲7.0
FDP	Felix Fischer	14,275	8.6	▲6.8	17,626	10.6	▲5.5
Left	Alexander Kauz	8,691	5.2	▲0.6	9,588	5.8	▲1.1
Tierschutzpartei	Katrin Wiegand	3,180	1.9		2,105	1.3	▲0.3
FW					1,264	0.8	▲0.3
PARTEI					959	0.6	
ÖDP	Michael Kefer	1,698	1.0	▼1.0	959	0.6	▼0.1
Pirates					705	0.4	▼2.0
NPD					363	0.2	▼0.6
Tierschutzallianz					289	0.2	
BGE					284	0.2	
DM					208	0.1	
DiB					186	0.1	
V-Partei³					173	0.1	
Menschliche Welt					150	0.1	
MLPD					70	0.0	0.0
DIE RECHTE					33	0.0	
DKP					15	0.0	
Informal votes		2,112			2,024		
Total valid votes		166,356			166,444		
Turnout		168,468	77.2	▲5.8			
CDU hold	Majority	23,004	13.9	▼12.0			

=== 2013 election ===
Federal election (2013): Emmendingen – Lahr
Notes:	Blue background denotes the winner of the electorate vote. Pink background denotes a candidate elected from their party list. Yellow background denotes an electorate win by a list member, or other incumbent. A ✓ or ✗ denotes status of any incumbent, win or lose respectively.						
Party	Candidate	Votes	%	±%	Party votes	%	±%
CDU	✓ Peter Weiß	78,797	52.3	▲10.2	69,272	45.8	▲11.1
SPD	Johannes Fechner	39,772	26.4	▲2.2	32,131	21.2	▲0.9
Greens	Dorothee Granderath	17,368	11.5	▼3.8	18,293	12.1	▼2.5
Left	Rainer Wolf	7,002	4.6	▼2.4	7,016	4.6	▼3.0
ÖDP	Michael Kefer	3,006	2.0		1,087	0.7	▲0.4
FDP	Christian Satta	2,742	1.8	▼8.1	7,749	5.1	▼11.4
AfD					6,823	4.5	
Pirates					3,667	2.4	▲0.3
Tierschutzpartei					1,490	1.0	0.0
NPD	Hans-Jürgen Güllich	1,928	1.3	▼0.1	1,176	0.8	▼0.1
FW					710	0.5	
REP					413	0.3	▼0.4
PBC					397	0.3	▼0.1
RENTNER					371	0.2	
Volksabstimmung					363	0.2	0.0
Party of Reason					122	0.1	
PRO					101	0.1	
BIG					33	0.0	
MLPD					29	0.0	0.0
BüSo					26	0.0	0.0
Informal votes		3,254			2,600		
Total valid votes		150,615			151,269		
Turnout		153,869	71.4	▲1.2			
CDU hold	Majority	39,025	25.9	▲8.0			

=== 2009 election ===
Federal election (2009): Emmendingen – Lahr
Notes:	Blue background denotes the winner of the electorate vote. Pink background denotes a candidate elected from their party list. Yellow background denotes an electorate win by a list member, or other incumbent. A ✓ or ✗ denotes status of any incumbent, win or lose respectively.						
Party	Candidate	Votes	%	±%	Party votes	%	±%
CDU	✓ Peter Weiß	61,427	42.1	▼2.8	50,594	34.6	▼3.2
SPD	Johannes Fechner	35,339	24.2	▼12.2	29,740	20.4	▼12.1
Greens	Alexander Bonde	22,429	15.4	▲6.4	21,332	14.6	▲3.0
FDP	Tilla-Louise Deter	14,470	9.9	▲5.2	24,135	16.5	▲6.3
Left	Lukas Oßwald	10,238	7.0	▲3.6	11,134	7.6	▲3.7
Pirates					3,029	2.1	
Tierschutzpartei					1,425	1.0	
NPD	Kerstin Fritsch	2,022	1.4	▼0.2	1,310	0.9	▼0.2
REP					986	0.7	▼0.1
PBC					584	0.4	▼0.1
ÖDP					523	0.4	
Volksabstimmung					399	0.3	
DIE VIOLETTEN					355	0.2	
ADM					298	0.2	
DVU					86	0.1	
BüSo					56	0.0	0.0
MLPD					38	0.0	0.0
Informal votes		3,557			3,458		
Total valid votes		145,925			146,024		
Turnout		149,482	70.2	▼6.8			
CDU hold	Majority	26,088	17.9	▲9.4			

=== 2005 election ===
Federal election (2005):Emmendingen – Lahr
Notes:	Blue background denotes the winner of the electorate vote. Pink background denotes a candidate elected from their party list. Yellow background denotes an electorate win by a list member, or other incumbent. A ✓ or ✗ denotes status of any incumbent, win or lose respectively.						
Party	Candidate	Votes	%	±%	Party votes	%	±%
CDU	✓ Peter Weiß	70,646	44.9	▼0.5	59,587	37.8	▼3.0
SPD	Johannes Fechner	57,250	36.4	▼5.5	51,187	32.5	▼3.7
Greens	Alexander Bonde	14,050	8.9	▲1.8	18,349	11.7	▼0.8
FDP	Tilla Deter	7,380	4.7	0.0	16,140	10.3	▲3.5
Left	Ulf Fiedler	5,419	3.4		6,213	3.9	▲3.1
NPD	Jürgen Fischinger	2,444	1.6		1,708	1.1	▲0.8
Familie					1,348	0.9	
REP					1,223	0.8	0.0
PBC					757	0.5	▲0.2
GRAUEN					756	0.5	▲0.4
BüSo					123	0.1	▲
MLPD					70	0.0	
Informal votes		3,793			3,521		
Total valid votes		157,189			157,461		
Turnout		160,982	77.0	▼3.1			
CDU hold	Majority	13,396	8.5				
