= Lahr (electoral district) =

State electoral district of Germany

50: Lahr
- Electoral district for the Landtag of Baden-Württemberg
- Lahr in 2026
- District: Ortenaukreis
- Electorate: 112,805 (2026)
- Major settlements: Ettenheim, Fischerbach, Friesenheim, Gutach (Schwarzwaldbahn), Haslach im Kinzigtal, Hausach, Hofstetten, Hornberg, Kappel-Grafenhausen, Kippenheim, Lahr/Schwarzwald, Mahlberg, Meißenheim, Mühlenbach, Oberwolfach, Ringsheim, Rust (Baden), Schuttertal, Schwanau, Seelbach, Steinach, and Wolfach

Current electoral district
- Party: CDU
- Member: Marion Gentges

Lahr is an electoral constituency (German: Wahlkreis) represented in the Landtag of Baden-Württemberg.

Since 2026, it has elected one member via first-past-the-post voting. Voters cast a second vote under which additional seats are allocated proportionally state-wide. Under the constituency numbering system, it is designated as constituency 50.

It is wholly within the district of Ortenaukreis.

== Geography ==
The constituency includes the municipalities of Ettenheim, Fischerbach, Friesenheim, Gutach (Schwarzwaldbahn), Haslach im Kinzigtal, Hausach, Hofstetten, Hornberg, Kappel-Grafenhausen, Kippenheim, Lahr/Schwarzwald, Mahlberg, Meißenheim, Mühlenbach, Oberwolfach, Ringsheim, Rust (Baden), Schuttertal, Schwanau, Seelbach, Steinach, and Wolfach, within the district of Ortenaukreis.

There were 112,805 eligible voters in 2026.

== Members ==
=== First mandate ===
Both prior to and since the electoral reforms for the 2026 election, the winner of the plurality of the vote (first-past-the-post) in every constituency won the first mandate.

Election	Member	Party	%
1976	Karl Theodor Uhrig	CDU	
1980	Karl Theodor Uhrig	CDU	
1984	Karl Theodor Uhrig	CDU	
1988	Karl Theodor Uhrig	CDU	
1992	Helmut Rau	CDU	
1996	Helmut Rau	CDU	
2001	Helmut Rau	CDU	49.8
2006	Helmut Rau	CDU	50.3
2011	Helmut Rau	CDU	41.4
2016	Sandra Boser	Grüne	30.7
2021	Sandra Boser	Grüne	33.1
2026	Marion Gentges	CDU	38.8

=== Second mandate ===
Prior to the electoral reforms for the 2026 election, the seats in the state parliament were allocated proportionately amongst parties which received more than 5% of valid votes across the state. The seats that were won proportionally for parties that did not win as many first mandates as seats they were entitled to, were allocated to their candidates which received the highest proportion of the vote in their respective constituencies. This meant that following some elections, a constituency would have one or more members elected under a second mandate.

Prior to 2011, these second mandates were allocated to the party candidates who got the greatest number of votes, whilst from 2011-2021, these were allocated according to percentage share of the vote.

Prior to 1988, this constituency did not elect any members on a second mandate.

Election	Member	Party
1988	Walter Caroli	SPD
1992	Walter Caroli	SPD
1996	Walter Caroli	SPD
2001	Walter Caroli	SPD
2006		
2011	Sandra Boser	Grüne
2016	Marion Gentges	CDU
2021	Marion Gentges	CDU

== Election results ==
=== 2026 election ===
State election (2026): Lahr
Notes:	Blue background denotes the winner of the electorate vote. Pink background denotes a candidate elected from their party list. Yellow background denotes an electorate win by a list member, or other incumbent. A ✓ or ✗ denotes status of any incumbent, win or lose respectively.						
Party	Candidate	Votes	%	±%	Party votes	%	±%
CDU	Marion Gentges	28,713	38.8	▲14.3	23,758	32.0	▲7.5
Greens	✗ Sandra Boser	16,516	22.3	▼10.8	18,947	25.5	▼7.5
AfD	Benjamin Rösch	16,374	22.1	▲12.1	15,898	21.4	▲11.4
SPD	Kai Schröder-Klings	5,791	7.8	▼2.6	4,526	6.1	▼4.3
Left	Jana Kühl	3,226	4.4	▲1.8	2,463	3.3	▲0.7
FDP	Udo Zahn	3,040	4.1	▼6.1	2,840	3.8	▼6.3
FW					2,039	2.7	▼1.1
BSW					1,039	1.4	
APT					896	1.2	
Volt					451	0.6	
PARTEI					292	0.4	▼1.1
Values	Sandra Buttenmüller	306	0.4		252	0.3	
dieBasis					197	0.3	▼0.9
Bündnis C					148	0.2	▼0.4
Pensioners					114	0.2	
ÖDP					94	0.1	▼0.6
Team Todenhöfer					73	0.1	
Verjüngungsforschung					61	0.1	
PdF					50	0.1	
Humanists					30	0.0	
KlimalisteBW					22	0.0	▼0.8
Informal votes		787			563		
Total valid votes		73,966			74,190		
Turnout		74,753	67.0	▲6.0			
CDU gain from Greens	Majority	12,197	16.5				

== See also ==
- Politics of Baden-Württemberg
- Landtag of Baden-Württemberg
