= Schutter (Kinzig) =

River in Germany

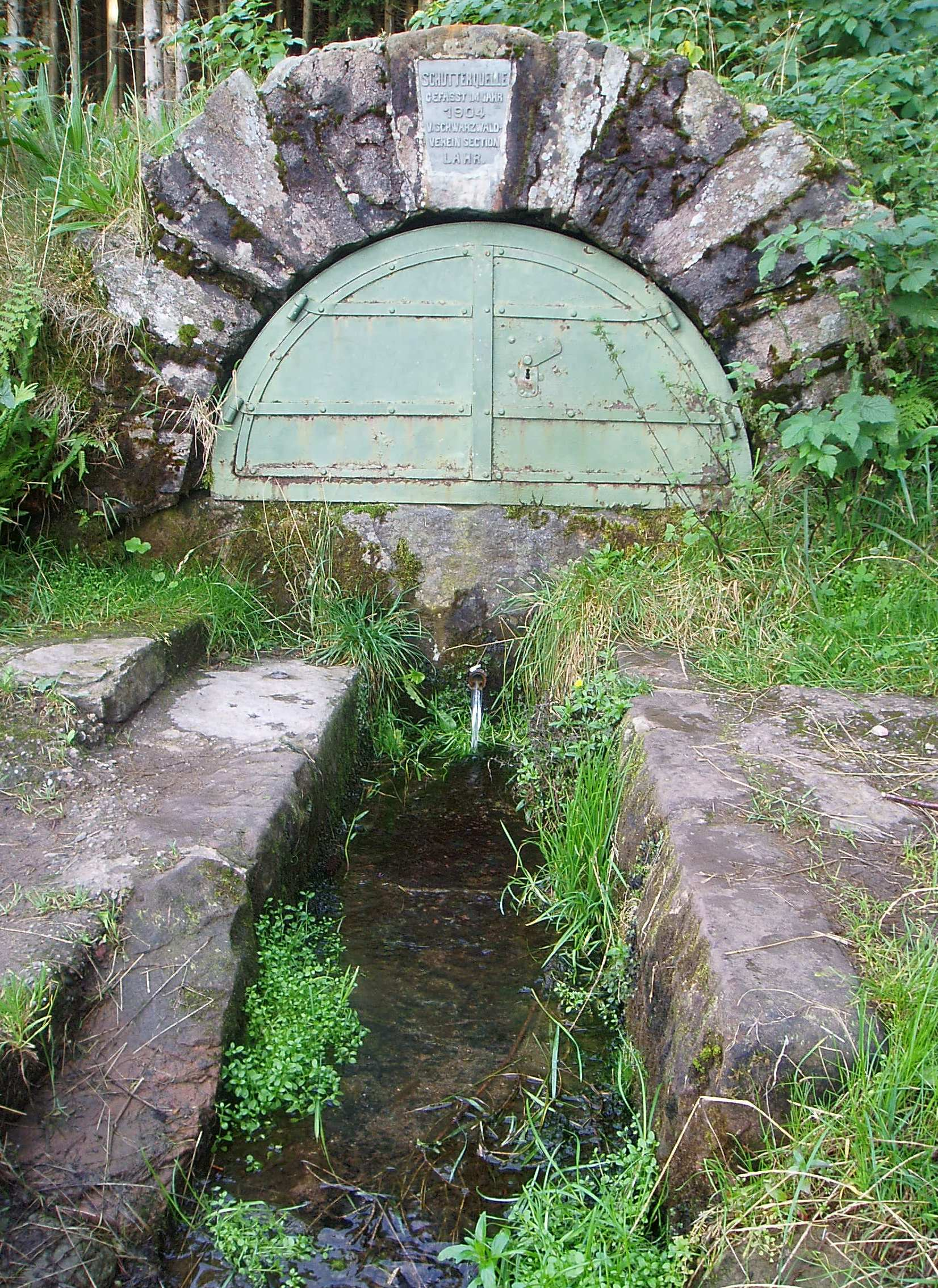
- Source of the Schutter

Location
- Country: Germany
- State: Baden-Württemberg
- Reference no.: DE: 2348

Physical characteristics
- Source
  - location: at Hünersedel in Schweighausen
  - coordinates: 48°12′41″N 8°00′03″E
  - elevation: 680 m above sea level (NN)
- Mouth
  - location: Near Kehl
  - coordinates: 48°33′33″N 7°51′20″E
- Length: 57.0 km (35.4 mi)
- Basin size: 336 km^{2} (130 sq mi)

Basin features
- Progression: Kinzig→ Rhine→ North Sea
- Landmarks: Large towns: Lahr; Small towns: Seelbach
- Tributaries
  - left: Runzenbach, Regelsbach, Wolfersbach, Litschentalbach, Sulzbach, Unditz
  - right: Prinschbach, Durenbach, Laulisgraben, Kambach, Michelbronnbach, Tretenbach, Selmenbächle, Steinbächle, Talbach, Giesen, Brudertalbach

The Schutter (German pronunciation: [ˈʃʊtɐ]) is a 57-kilometre-long (35 mi) river in Baden-Württemberg, Germany, and a left tributary of the Kinzig.

== Etymology ==
Linguistic experts disagree about the etymological meaning of the name Schutter. The word Schutter is probably derived from the early Germanic form scutro, which means 'fast flowing water'. Scutro, which includes the Indo-Germanic root sceud, also allows interpretation in the sense of 'enclosing' or 'impoundment of water' and may refer to the plethora of embankments, dams and mills on the Schutter.

In addition to the municipalities of Schuttertal and Schutterwald, Schutterzell, a district of Neuried also bear the name of the river in their place names. The name of the Schutterlindenberg hill in Lahr also comes from the name of the river.

== Source, course and tributaries ==
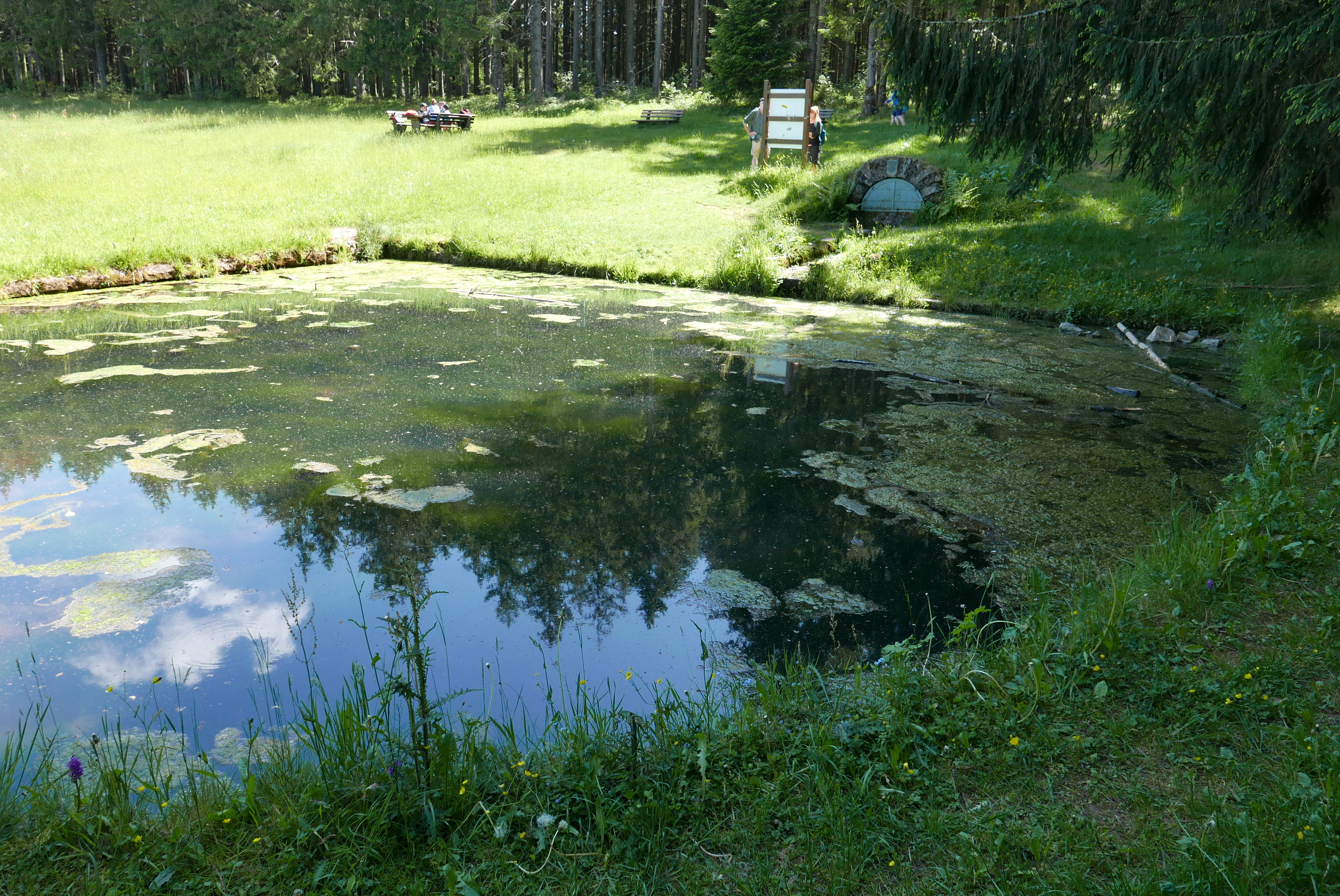
Source pond of the Schutter

The Schutter rises at Hünersedel in the Black Forest above Schweighausen at a height of 680 metres, but really begins in the village of Schweighausen at the confluence of two little brooks, the Geisbergbach and the Lohbach. Their source was enclosed in 1904 by the Lahr Branch of the Black Forest Club as called the Schutterquelle. The Schutter initially flows westwards, then, after an almost right-angled bend, northwards through the municipalities of Schuttertal and Seelbach. It then flows increasingly in an arc towards the west again and passes through the borough of Lahr. The Schutter then leaves the Black Forest and flows in a northerly direction parallel to the River Rhine through the Upper Rhine Plain. It crosses the parishes of Friesenheim, Neuried, Schutterwald, Kehl and Willstätt and empties into the Kinzig near Kehl, a few kilometres before the Kinzig joined the Rhine.

At the end of the last ice age, the Würm Glaciation), the Schutter flowed, like other Black Forest rivers, parallel to the Rhine in the still recognizable Kinzig-Murg Channel.

The major tributaries of the Schutter are the Sulzbach and the Unditz.

== Use ==
Passing through 19 towns and villages, the Schutter used to be an important source of energy for commercial traders for centuries. According to the 1925 Baden Hydropower Register (Badische Wasserkraftkataster), no less than 36 hydroelectric power stations operated on the Schutter with a total of 47 waterwheels, 12 electricity generator stations with 17 turbines, including house and farm mills, industrial mills, hammer forges, electricity works, oil mills, barley presses and sawmills.

The water of the Schutter was also used to irrigate meadows (water meadows). Today still recognizable meadow-watering systems are found in the parish of Friesenheim-Oberschopfheim, in Hohberg-Niederschopfheim, Kehl-Goldscheuer, Willstätt-Eckartsweier (west of the village and in the Schutterwald meadows). So much water was impounded above mills (the Schutterzell mill, Dundenheim mill and Kittersburg mill) or in specially constructed weirs (Eckartsweier), that the surface of the water was higher than the surrounding land and was discharged into irrigation channels. The largest water meadows were the Unterwassermatten (today a nature reserve), which was irrigated for about a hundred years before being abandoned in 1935. In the 2000s, the irrigation of the meadows of Eckartsweier and Kittersburg was put back into operation for ecological reasons. In the Oberschopfheimer Allmend, meadow irrigation was also restarted in 2014.

== Flooding and flood protection ==
The Schutter has flooded time and again, for example in 1958, 1970, 1978, 1980 and 1987, drowning arable land and destroying roads, bridges and houses. The Schutter valley, Lahr and Rhine Plain were equally affected by floods caused by the Schutter. In addition to the many reports of floods in the local town councils minutes, the Flood Cross (Hochwasserkreuz) in Schweighausen recalls a flood in 1895. On 6 June the farmer, Landolin Bauer, was carried away in the floodwaters together with his horse and cart. A cross was erected at the site of the accident above the farm of Stefisbauernhof: in the Steig, in honor of the victim.

In the years 1936 to 1938, the Schutter Relief Canal was built between Lahr-Dinglingen and Nonnenweier in order to protect the villages and towns alongside the Schutter in the Rhine Plain from flood permanently. In addition, two flood retention basins were built at Lahr-Kuhbach (built between 1983 and 1985) and Seelbach-Wittelbach (built between 1989 and 1991). In the 1980s, the relevant municipalities founded the Schutter Mouth Flood Protection Association (Zweckverband Hochwasserschutz Schuttermündung), headquartered in Kehl, to be responsible for flood protection on the lowland section of the Schutter. Between 1994 and 2007, 14 flood protection measures were carried out and some sections of the Schutter were re-naturalised.

== See also ==
- List of rivers of Baden-Württemberg
