= Yannick Bury =

German politician (born 1990)

Yannick Bury MdB
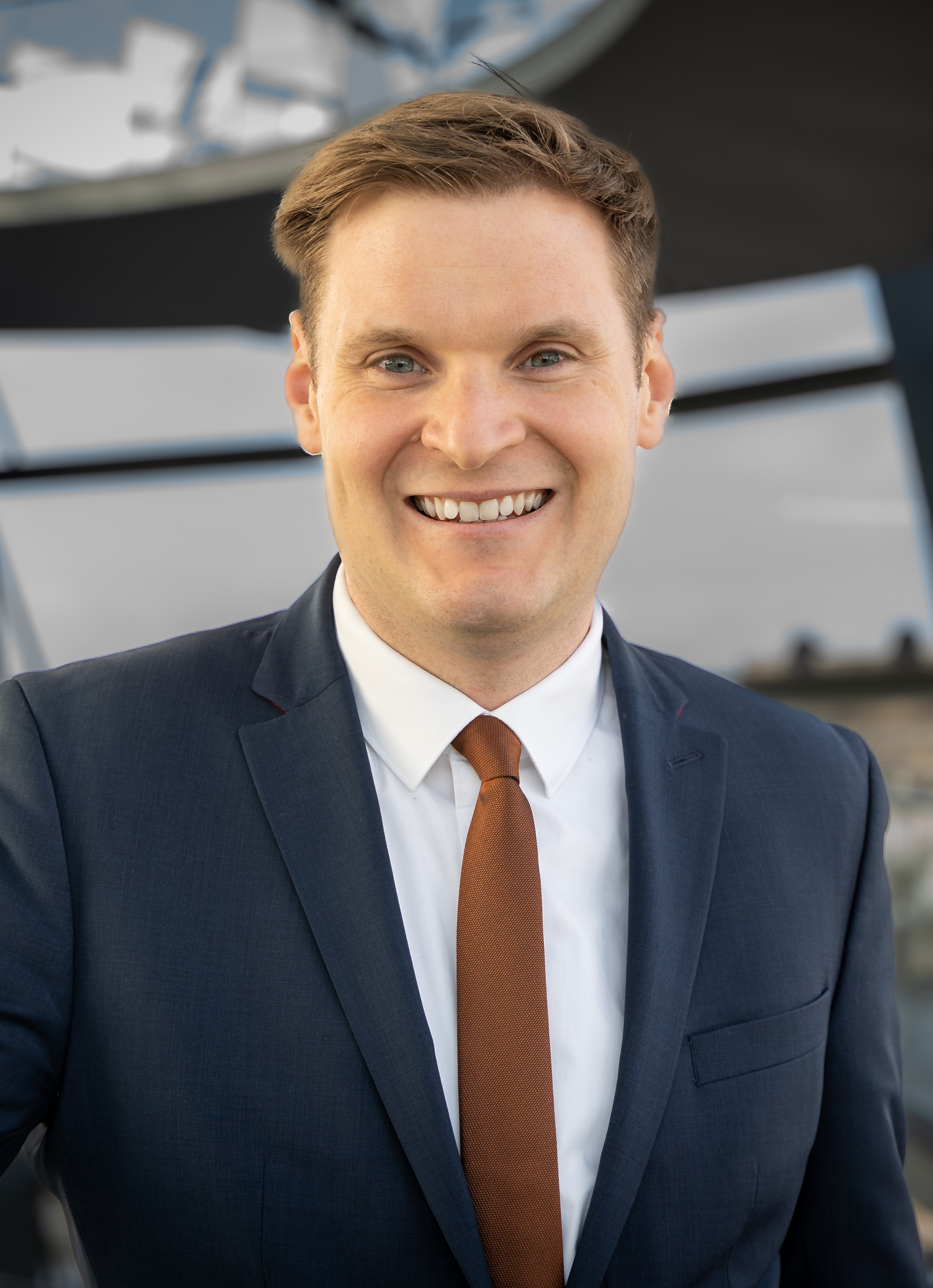
- Bury in 2023

Member of the Bundestag; for Emmendingen – Lahr
- Incumbent
- Assumed office 26 October 2021
- Preceded by: Peter Weiß

Personal details
- Born: 11 March 1990 (age 36) Herbolzheim, West Germany
- Party: Christian Democratic Union
- Education: University of Freiburg

Yannick Bury (born 11 March 1990 in Herbolzheim) is a German economist and politician of the Christian Democratic Union (CDU) who has been a member of the Bundestag, the German federal diet, since 2021.

== Early life and career ==
Bury was born in 1990 in the West German town of Herbolzheim and grew up in Broggingen and Malterdingen. From 2000 to 2006 he attended the Emil-Dörle-Realschule and in 2009 he graduated from the Wirtschaftsgymnasium Emmendingen. He completed his civilian service at the Caritas workshop in Riegel. Following that, Bury studied economics at the University of Freiburg in Freiburg where he graduated with a Master of Science in economics.

Since 2017, Bury has been working as an economist and research consultant at the Walter Eucken Institut in Freiburg.

== Political career ==
=== Early beginnings ===
In 2006, Bury joined the Young Union (JU). From 2009 to 2016 he was district chairman of the JU in Emmendingen and from 2016 to 2019 district chairman of the Junge Union Südbaden. Since 2019, Bury has been district chairman of the Emmendingen CDU district association and chairman of the International Commission of the Young Union of Germany.

=== Member of the German Parliament, 2021–present ===
In the 2021 German federal election, Bury ran as a direct candidate for the CDU in the Emmendingen – Lahr federal electoral district. He won the direct mandate with 27.8% of the first votes against the SPD candidate Johannes Fechner.

In parliament, Bury has been member of the Budget Committee. Since 2025, he has been part of the so-called Confidential Committee (Vertrauensgremium) of the Budget Committee, which provides budgetary supervision for Germany's three intelligence services, BND, BfV and MAD.

In addition to his committee assignments, Bury has been a member of the German delegation to the Franco-German Parliamentary Assembly.

== Other activities ==
- Theodor Heuss House Foundation, Member of the Board of Trustees (since 2026)
- Jacques Delors Centre at Hertie School, Member of the Advisory Board
- University of Freiburg, Member of the Advisory Board

== Personal life ==
Bury is of Protestant denomination, married and father of a son.
