= Lauf (Baden) =

- Municipality
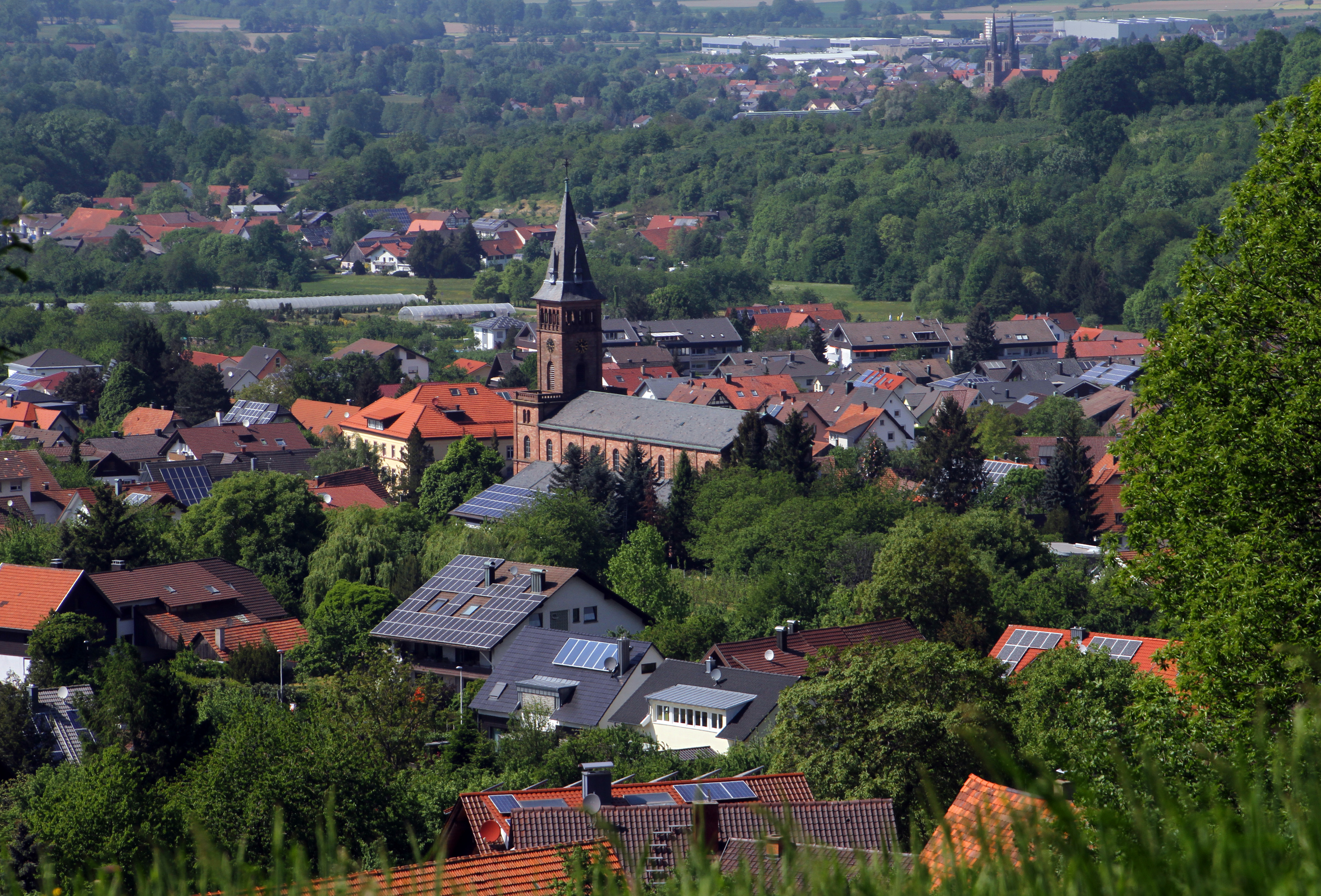

- Coat of arms

- Location of Lauf within Ortenaukreis district
- Interactive map of Lauf
- Location within Germany Location within Baden-Württemberg
- Coordinates: 48°38′58″N 08°07′57″E
- Country: Germany
- State: Baden-Württemberg
- Admin. region: Freiburg
- District: Ortenaukreis

Government
  - Mayor (2022–30): Bettina Kist

Area
  - Total: 15 km^{2} (5.8 sq mi)
- Elevation: 279 m (915 ft)

Population (2025-12-31)
  - Total: 3,965
  - Density: 260/km^{2} (680/sq mi)
- Time zone: UTC+01:00 (CET)
  - Summer (DST): UTC+02:00 (CEST)
- Postal codes: 77886
- Dialling codes: 07841
- Vehicle registration: OG, BH, KEL, LR, WOL
- Website: www.lauf-schwarzwald.de

Lauf (German pronunciation: [laʊf]; Low Alemannic: Louf) is a municipality in the district of Ortenau in Western Baden-Württemberg, Germany.

Lauf is a locality positioned at the western periphery of the Black Forest, also known as Schwarzwald, within the valley of Laufbachtal.

== Geography ==
The geographical feature that provides the name to Lauf is the Laufbach stream. This body of water originates from the northwestern side of the Hornisgrinde, subsequently flowing past Glashütte and eventually reaching Lauf. Its rapid descent forms a distinctive feature of the local topography.

Almost half of the municipality's territory is forested. In the Laufbach valley and its side valleys, a large part of the original abundance of plant species, including flower meadows with some native orchid species, has been preserved.

The region's land use primarily comprises viticulture, facilitated by the abundance of south-facing slopes that are ideal for vineyards.

== History ==
The first documentary mention (as Löuffe) was in 1383. The village initially belonged to the Imperial Austrian bailiwick of Ortenau. From 1805 the community belonged to the Electorate of Baden (from 1806 Grand Duchy of Baden), where it was assigned in 1807 to the Amt of Bühl, which became the district of Bühl in 1939. With its dissolution in 1973, the village became part of the newly formed Ortenau district.

Since 1648, the name St. Leonhard has been associated with the municipality of Lauf. At that time, the first village church in Lauf was dedicated to St. Leonhard, today's parish church of St. Leonhard was built in 1882/1884

In January 1944, Stefan Könninger, a locksmith and Wehrmacht soldier from Lauf, made a defeatist statement about the war situation and was denounced. He was sentenced to death by the Central Court of the Army for undermining the armed forces and executed in Berlin on August 21, 1944

== Demographics ==
Population development:

Year	Inhabitants
1990	3,869
2001	3,975
2011	3,841
2021	3,993
