= Heinrich Höfler =

German politician (1897–1963)

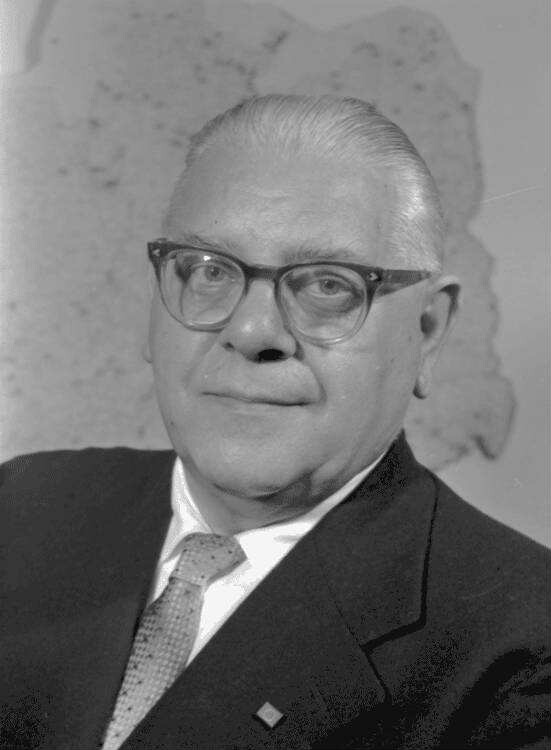
- Höfler in 1961

Member of the Bundestag; for Emmendingen
- In office 7 September 1949 – 21 October 1963
- Preceded by: Constituency established
- Succeeded by: Kurt Härzschel

Personal details
- Born: 16 February 1897 Schwetzingen, Germany
- Died: 21 October 1963 (aged 66) Bonn, West Germany
- Party: Christian Democratic Union
- Education: University of Freiburg; Heidelberg University

Heinrich Höfler (16 February 1897 – 21 October 1963) was a German politician of the Christian Democratic Union (CDU) and former member of the German Bundestag.

== Life ==
In 1949 Höfler had himself nominated as a CDU candidate for the Emmendingen constituency for the election to the first Bundestag. He was elected by an absolute majority and continued to belong to the German Bundestag in the following legislative periods until his death in 1963. He was able to defend the direct mandate in his constituency in all ballots.

== Literature ==
Herbst, Ludolf; Jahn, Bruno (2002). Vierhaus, Rudolf (ed.). Biographisches Handbuch der Mitglieder des Deutschen Bundestages. 1949–2002 [Biographical Handbook of the Members of the German Bundestag. 1949–2002] (in German). München: De Gruyter - De Gruyter Saur. p. 1715. ISBN 978-3-11-184511-1.
