= Albert Burger (politician) =

German politician (1925–1981)

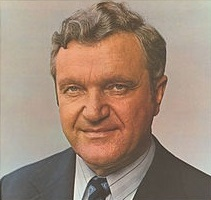
- Albert Burger

Member of the Bundestag
- In office 19 October 1965 – 10 October 1981
- Preceded by: Kurt Härzschel
- Succeeded by: Honor Funk
- Constituency: Emmendingen – Wolfach (1965–1980); Emmendingen – Lahr (1980–1981)

Personal details
- Born: 23 February 1925 Waldkirch, Germany
- Died: 10 October 1981 (aged 56) Freiburg im Breisgau, West Germany
- Party: Christian Democratic Union

Albert Burger (1925–1981) was a German politician who was a member of Christian Democratic Union (CDU) and served as member of the German Bundestag.

== Life ==
Burger joined the CDU in 1947 and was later elected as the chairman of the Emmendingen district CDU association. He served as the deputy chairman of the CDU district association of South Baden from 1966 to 1977, and also as the chairman of the Christian Democratic Workers' Union of South Baden from 1966 to 1981.

Burger became a council member of the Kollnau community in 1953 and was elected to the district council of the Emmendingen district in 1956. He remained a member of the council until 1964 and served as the chairman of the CDU faction there from 1959. He also served as a member of the Baden-Württemberg Landtag from 1964 until he resigned from office on 31 October 1965

In 1965, Burger was elected as a member of the German Bundestag, and he served in this position until his death. He represented the constituency of Emmendingen – Wolfach from 1965 to 1980 and later the constituency of Emmendingen – Lahr.

== Literature ==
Herbst, Ludolf; Jahn, Bruno (2002). Vierhaus, Rudolf (ed.). Biographisches Handbuch der Mitglieder des Deutschen Bundestages. 1949–2002 [Biographical Handbook of the Members of the German Bundestag. 1949–2002] (in German). München: De Gruyter - De Gruyter Saur. p. 1715. ISBN 978-3-11-184511-1.
