= Durbach =

- Municipality
- Coat of arms

- Location of Durbach within Ortenaukreis district
- Interactive map of Durbach
- Location within Germany Location within Baden-Württemberg
- Coordinates: 48°30′N 8°1′E
- Country: Germany
- State: Baden-Württemberg
- Admin. region: Freiburg
- District: Ortenaukreis

Government
  - Mayor (2022–30): Andreas König (CDU)

Area
  - Total: 26.33 km^{2} (10.17 sq mi)
- Elevation: 208 m (682 ft)

Population (2025-12-31)
  - Total: 4,059
  - Density: 154.2/km^{2} (399.3/sq mi)
- Time zone: UTC+01:00 (CET)
  - Summer (DST): UTC+02:00 (CEST)
- Postal codes: 77770
- Dialling codes: 0781
- Vehicle registration: OG, BH, KEL, LR, WOL
- Website: www.durbach.de

Durbach is a municipality in the district of Ortenau in Baden-Württemberg in Germany. It is situated on the verge of the northern Black Forest Mountains six kilometers north east of the town of Offenburg.

Main branches of commerce are agriculture (especially production of wine) and tourism. It is known for its Riesling wine. The Riesling grape grown in the Ortenau district is known as Klingelberger for the name of a vineyard in Durbach.

== History ==
Durbach was mentioned first in 1287 as Turbach. In 1973 the community included Ebersweier.

== Culture and attractions ==
Attractions include the town itself and surrounding vineyards which span the slopes of the mountains.

- Schloss Staufenberg is a castle, owned by the Markgraf von Baden with views over the Rhine valley and Strassbourg to the Vosges mountains in Alsace.
- Contemporary art museum Hurrle
- The «Skulpturenpark» is an exhibition of contemporary sculptures in the park of the MediClin Staufenburg Klinik.

== Partnership ==
Partnership towns are:

- Austria Bürserberg, Vorarlberg, Austria
- France Châteaubernard, Nouvelle-Aquitaine, France.

== Gallery ==
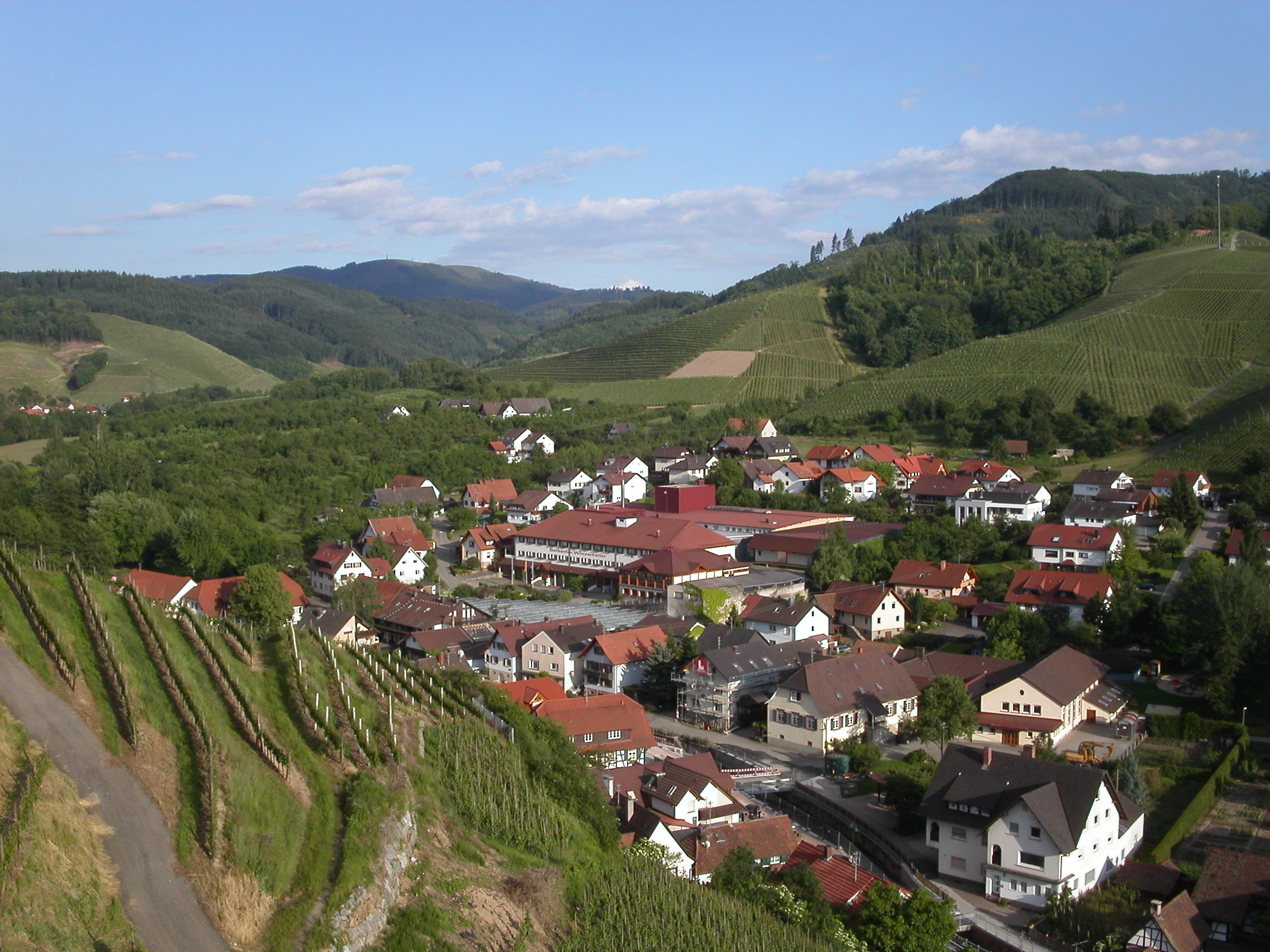
Durbach

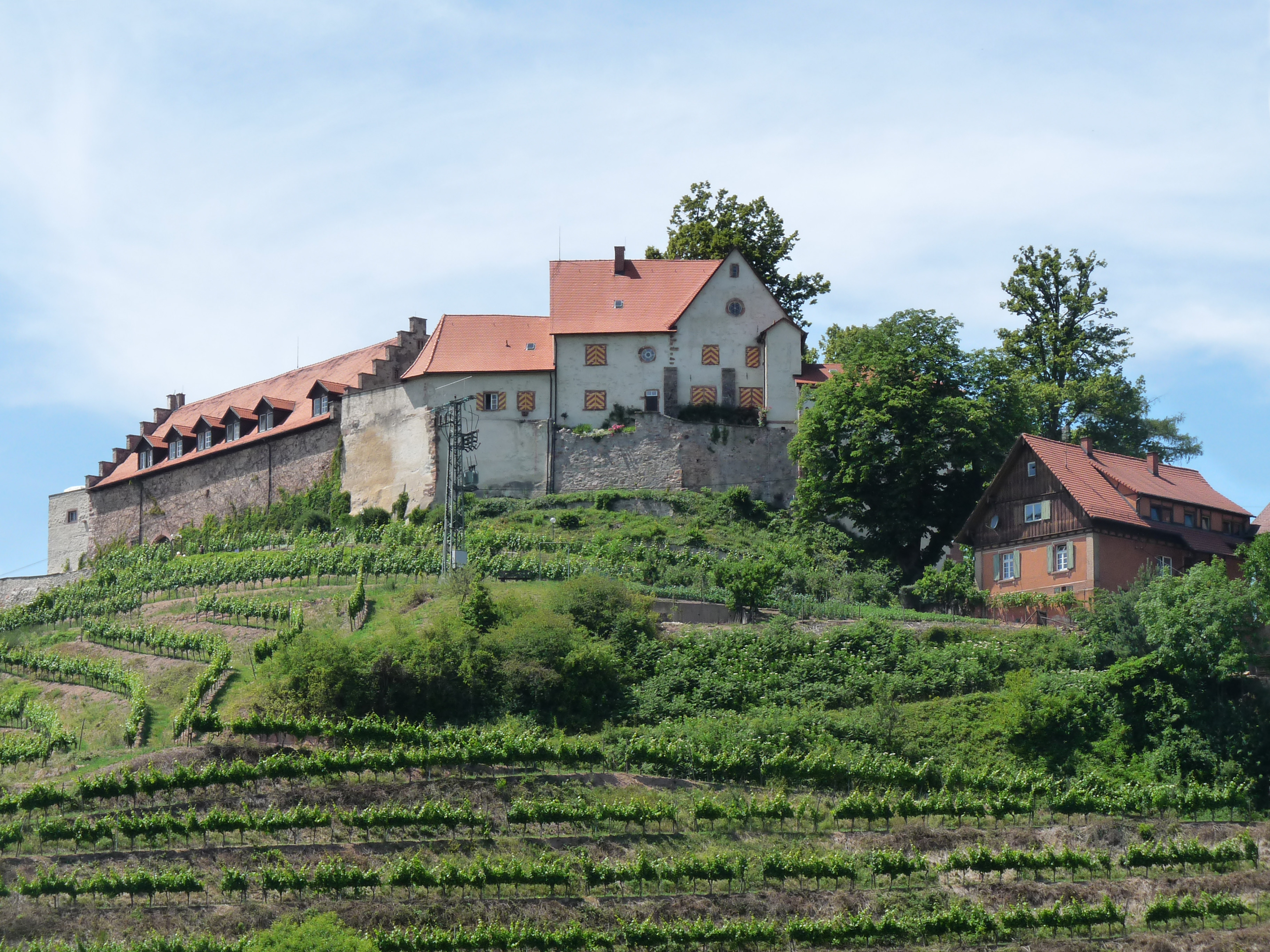
Staufenberg Castle

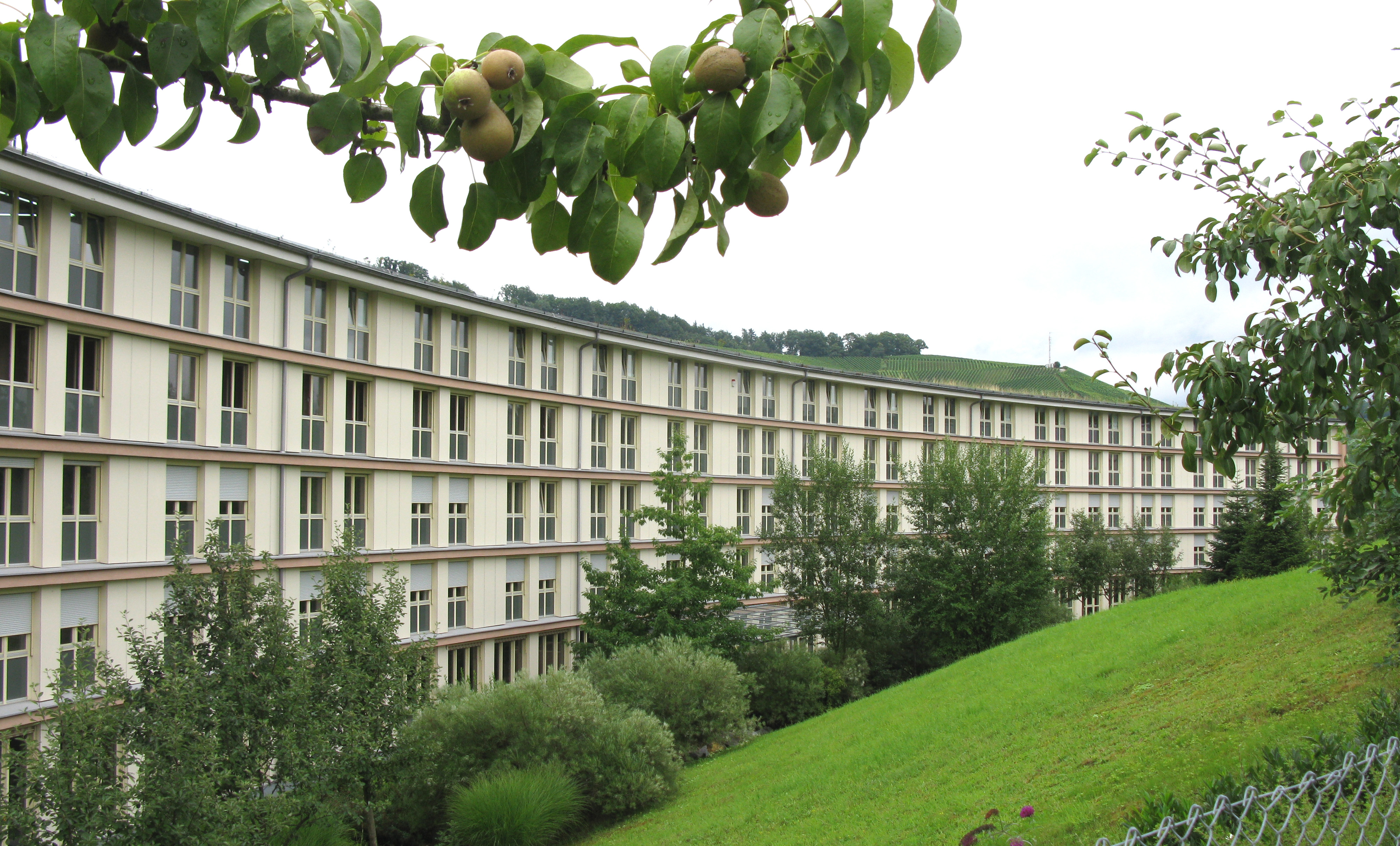
Hurrle Collection

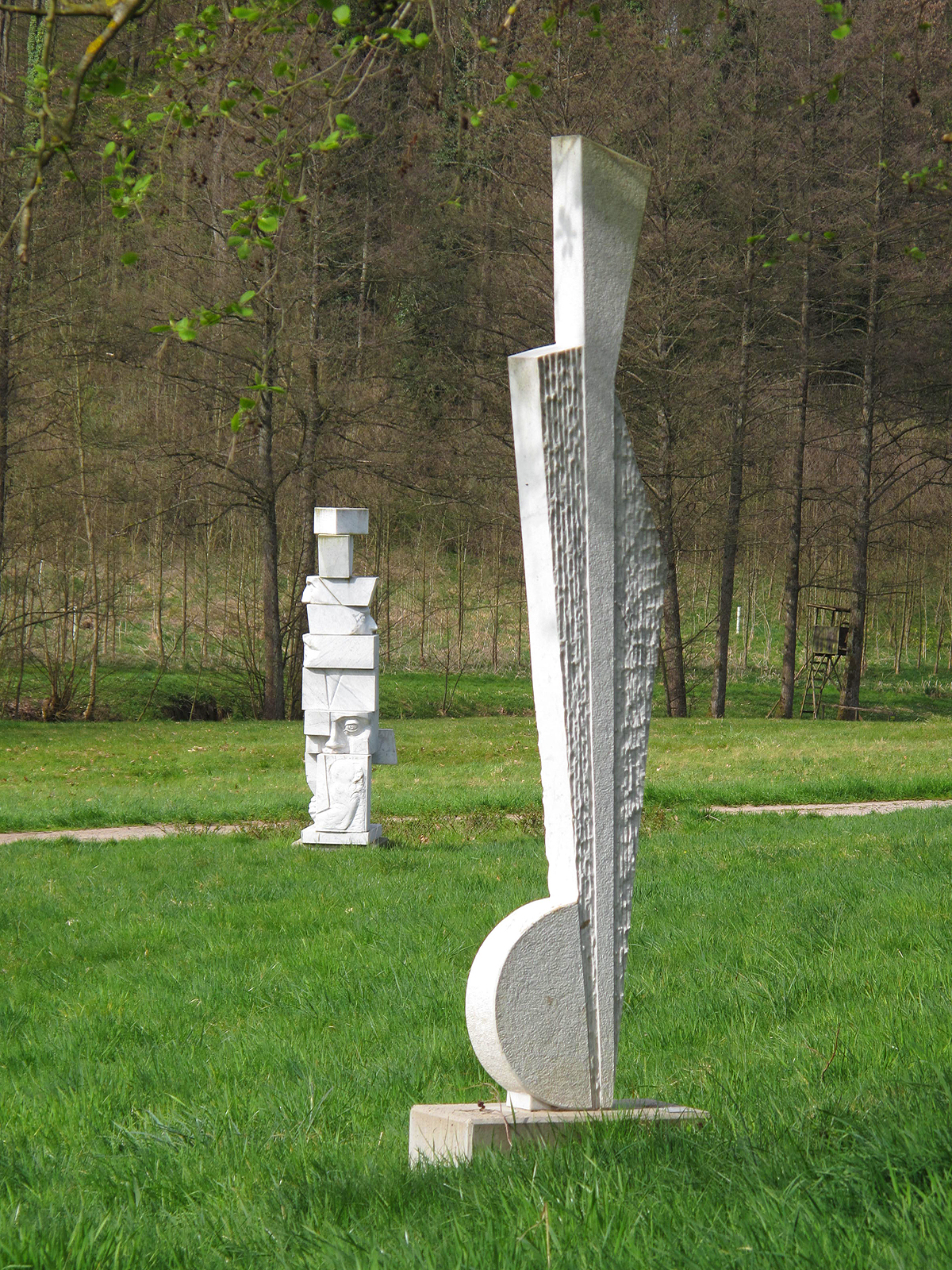
Martin Petz (Topas),
Solitudine, 1996
Sculptures park

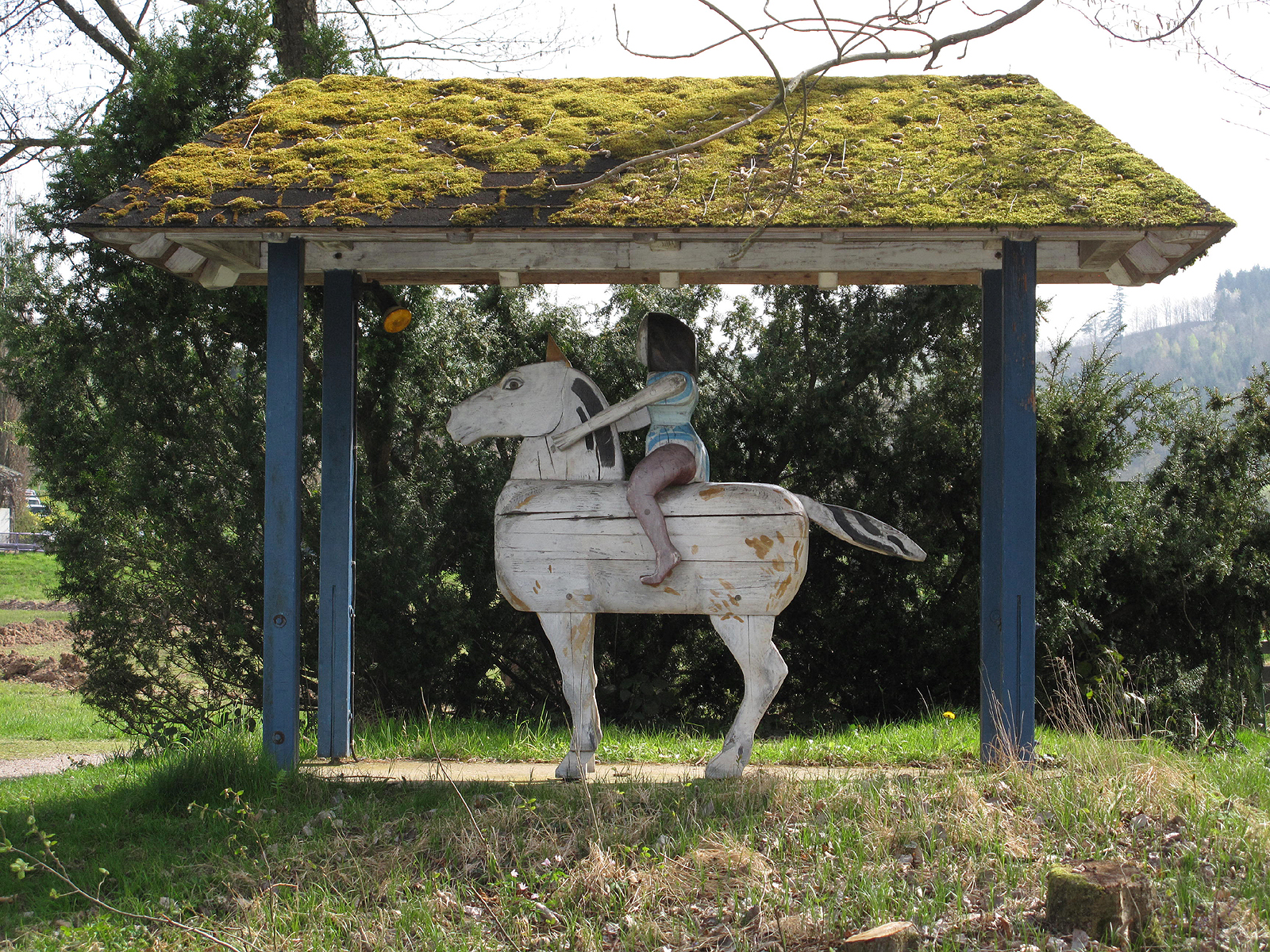
Christa Biederbick-Tewes,
Kleine Reiterin, 1986
Sculptures park

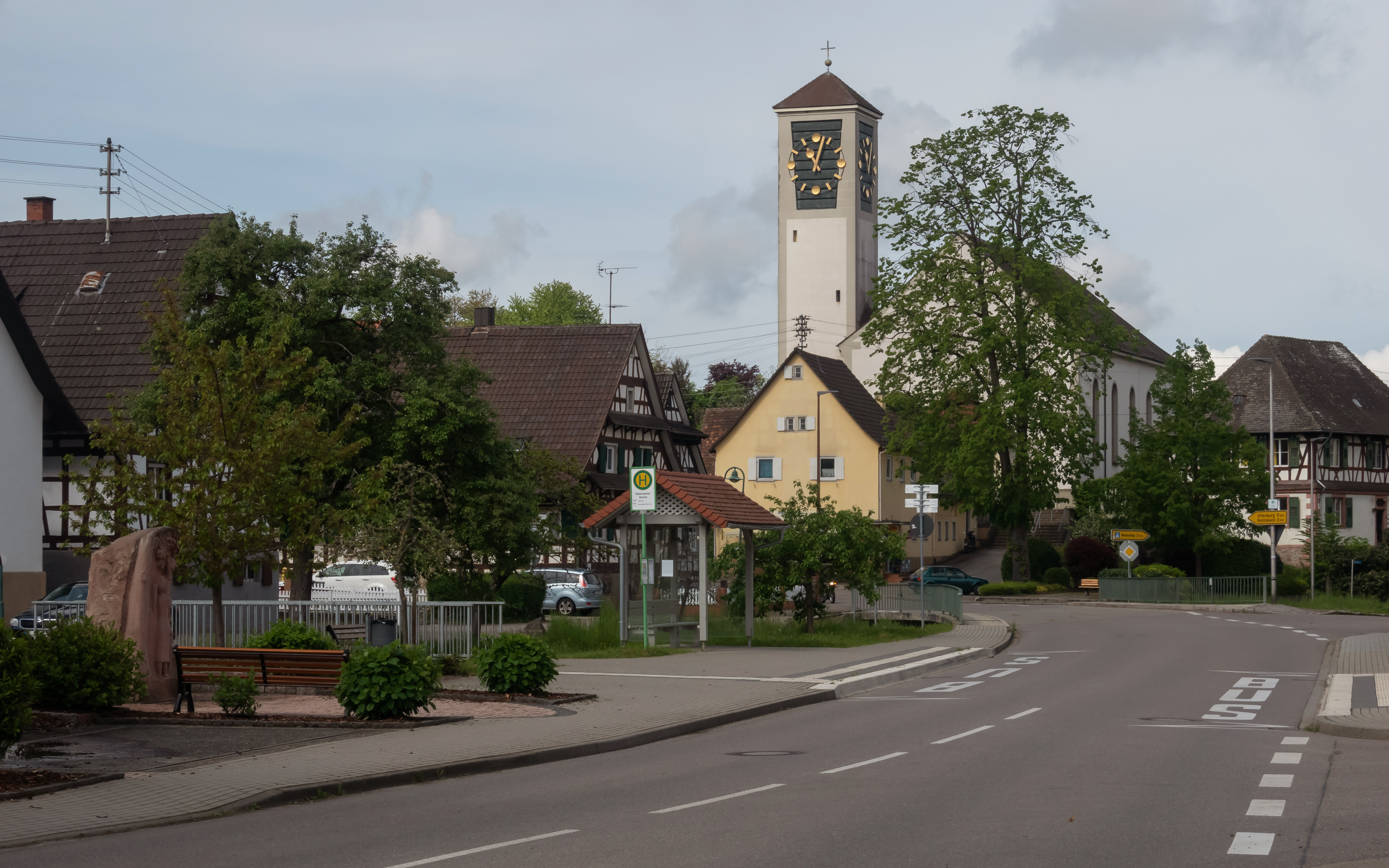
Ebersweier, church (Heilig Kreuz Kirche) in the street

== Other projects ==
- Commons Durbach
- Commons Skulpturenpark Durbach
- Commons Burg Staufenberg
