= Hünersedel =

Mountain

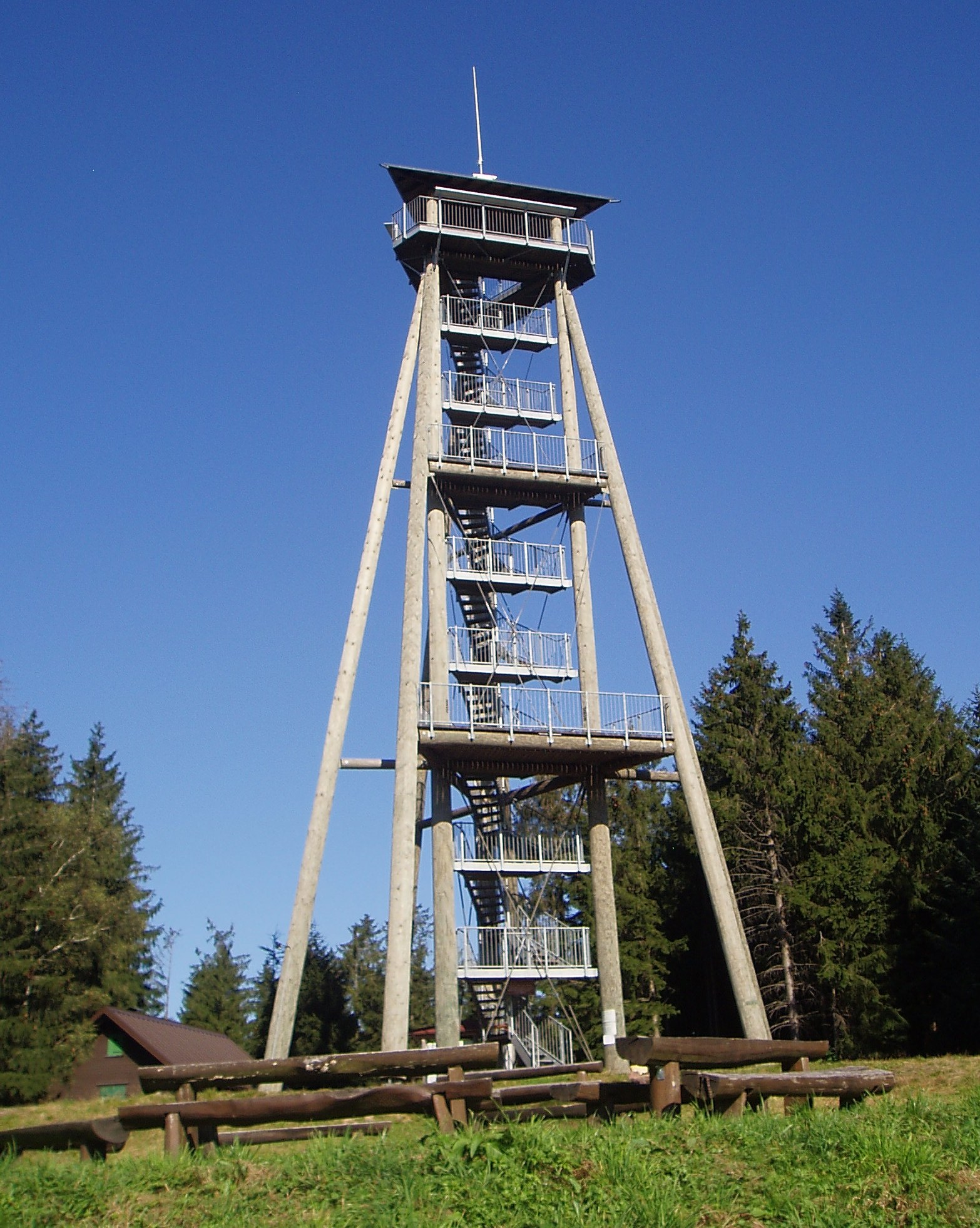
- Viewing tower on the top of the Hünersedel

Highest point
- Elevation: 744 m (2,441 ft)
- Coordinates: 48°12′17″N 7°58′17″E

Geography
- Location within Baden-Württemberg
- Location: Baden-Württemberg, Germany
- Parent range: Black Forest

The Hünersedel is a mountain located in the middle of the Black Forest, Germany, near the Schuttertal and the town of Freiamt. The mountain is 744 metres high and the source of the river Schutter.

The viewing tower on its top is 29 metres high and was erected in 2004.
