= Peter Weiß =

German politician

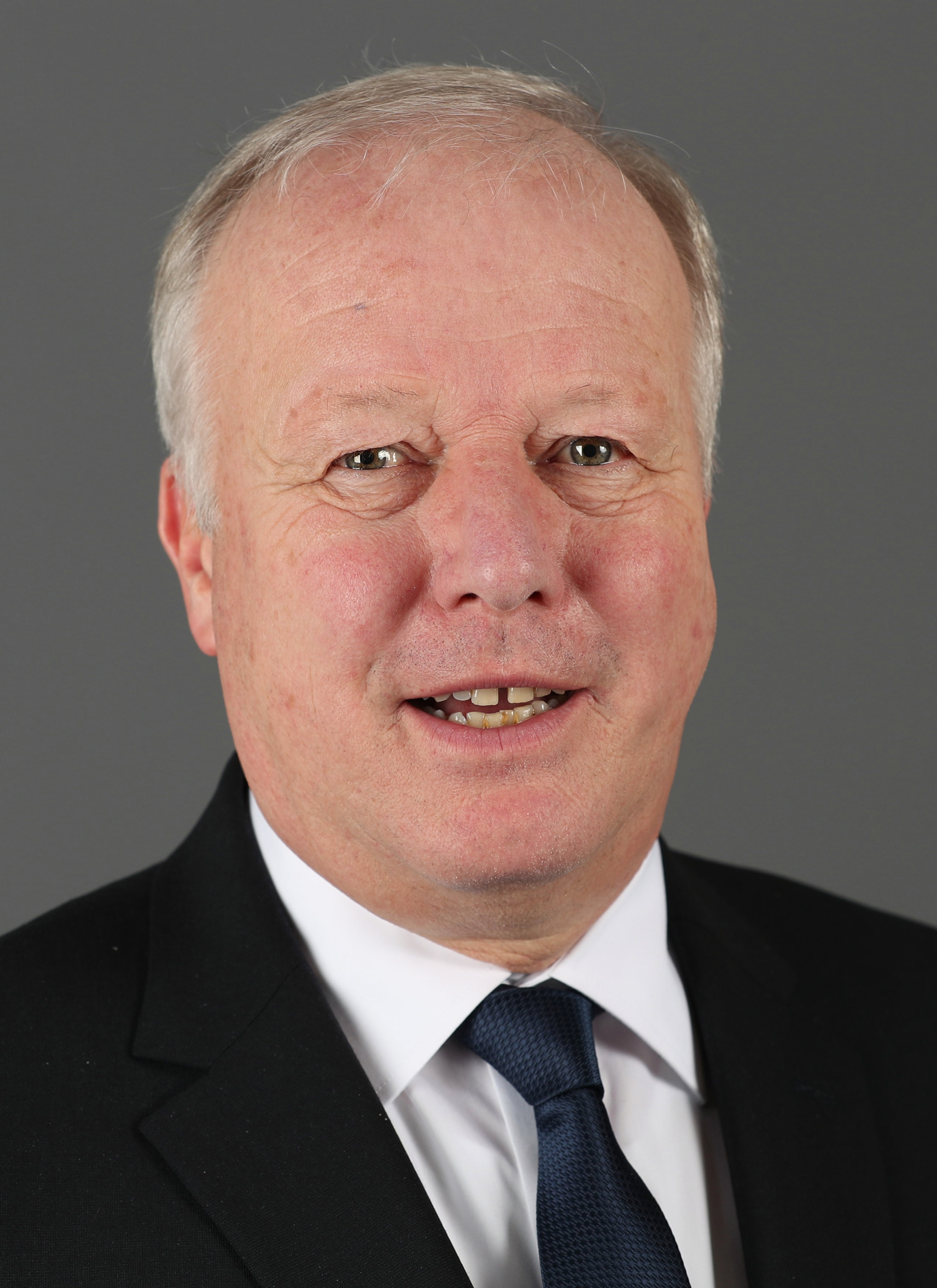
- Weiß in 2020

Member of the Bundestag; for Emmendingen – Lahr
- In office 26 October 1998 – 26 October 2021
- Preceded by: Rainer Haungs
- Succeeded by: Yannick Bury

Personal details
- Born: 12 March 1956 (age 70) Freiburg im Breisgau, West Germany
- Party: Christian Democratic Union
- Children: 3
- Education: University of Freiburg; University of Tübingen

Peter Weiß (born 12 March 1956) is a German politician of the Christian Democratic Union (CDU) who served as a member of the Bundestag from the state of Baden-Württemberg from 1998 until 2021.

== Early career ==
From 1985 until 1993, Weiß worked in various capacities for the German chapter of Caritas Internationalis. From 1993 until 1998, he was the managing director of the Catholic University of Applied Sciences in Freiburg.

== Political career ==
Weiß first became a member of the Bundestag in the 1998 German federal election, representing the Emmendingen – Lahr district. Throughout his time in parliament, he served on the Committee on Labour and Social Affairs. In addition to his committee assignments, he served as deputy chairman of the German-Brazilian Parliamentary Friendship Group.

In the negotiations to form a coalition government under the leadership of Chancellor Angela Merkel following the 2017 federal elections, Weiß was part of the working group on social affairs, led by Karl-Josef Laumann, Barbara Stamm and Andrea Nahles.

In July 2020, Weiß announced that he would not stand in the 2021 federal elections but instead resign from active politics by the end of the parliamentary term.

== Other activities ==
- Pax-Bank, Member of the Advisory Board on Ethics
- Maximilian Kolbe Werk, President
- Xertifix, Co-Founder and Member of the Board

== Political positions ==
In June 2017, Weiß voted against Germany’s introduction of same-sex marriage.

Ahead of the Christian Democrats’ leadership election in 2018, Weiß publicly endorsed Annegret Kramp-Karrenbauer to succeed Angela Merkel as the party’s chair.
