= Herbolzheim =

- Town
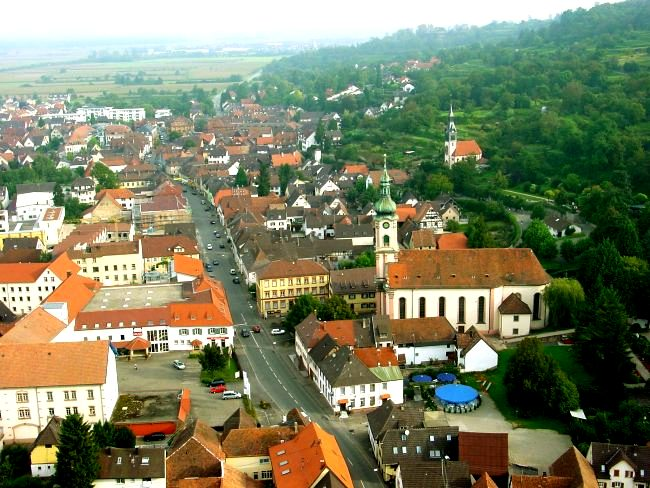
- Herbolzheim

- Coat of arms

- Location of Herbolzheim within Emmendingen district
- Interactive map of Herbolzheim
- Location within Germany Location within Baden-Württemberg
- Coordinates: 48°13′19″N 7°46′39″E
- Country: Germany
- State: Baden-Württemberg
- Admin. region: Freiburg
- District: Emmendingen
- Subdivisions: 5

Government
  - Mayor (2017–25): Thomas Gedemer

Area
  - Total: 35.48 km^{2} (13.70 sq mi)
- Elevation: 177 m (581 ft)

Population (2025-12-31)
  - Total: 10,741
  - Density: 302.7/km^{2} (784.1/sq mi)
- Time zone: UTC+01:00 (CET)
  - Summer (DST): UTC+02:00 (CEST)
- Postal codes: 79336
- Dialling codes: 07643
- Vehicle registration: EM
- Website: www.herbolzheim.de

Herbolzheim (German pronunciation: [ˈhɛʁbɔltsˌhaɪm]; Alemannic German: Härwelze) is a town in the district of Emmendingen, in Baden-Württemberg, Germany. It is situated near the river Elz, 26 km north of Freiburg.

== People ==
- Yannick Bury (born 1990), CDU politician
