= Thomas Seitz =

German lawyer and politician

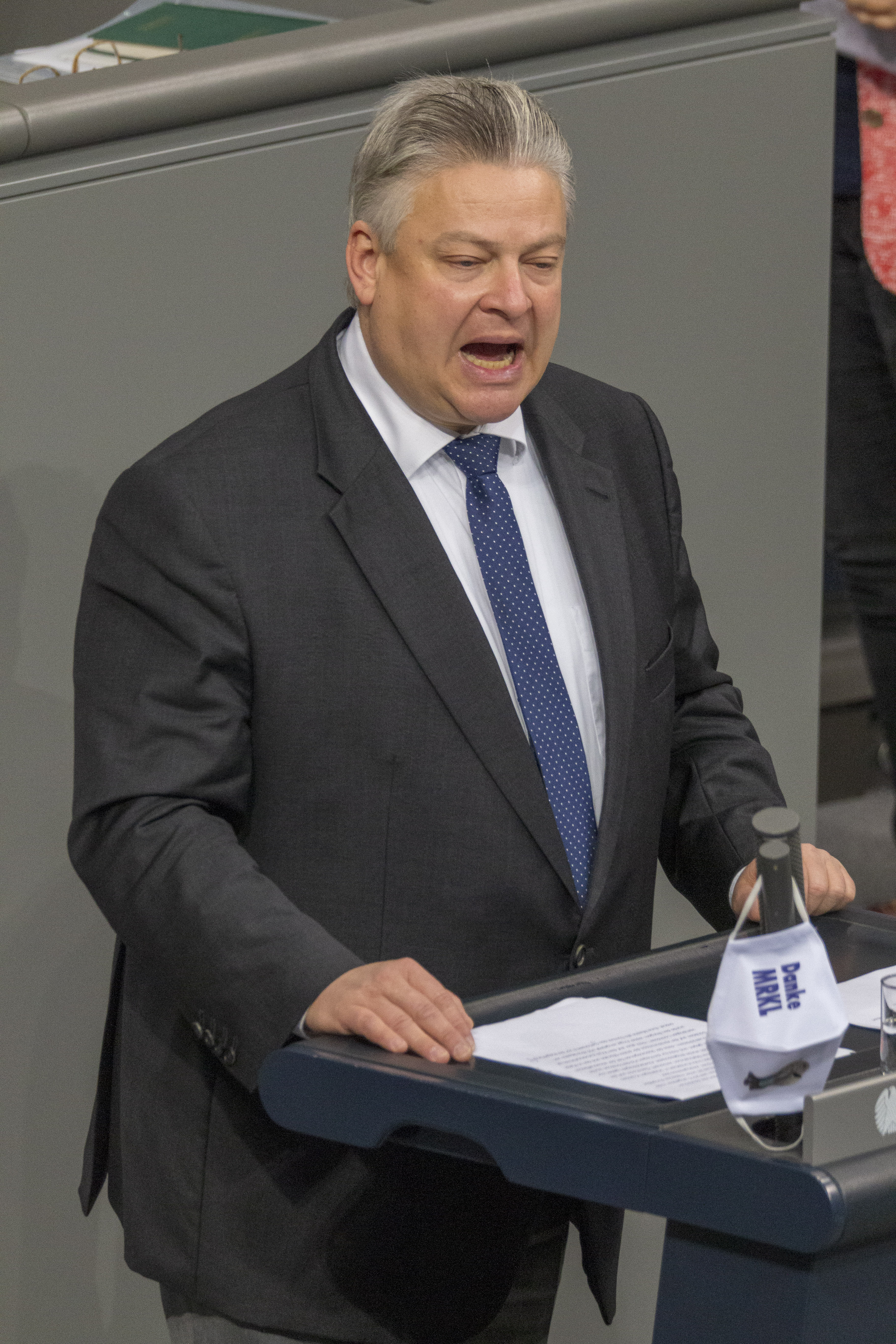
- Seitz in 2020

Member of the Bundestag
- Incumbent
- Assumed office 24 October 2017

Personal details
- Born: 8 October 1967 (age 58) Ettenheim
- Party: None

Thomas Seitz (born 8 October 1967 in Ettenheim) is a German lawyer and politician. He was member of the AfD from 2013 til March 31, 2024.

Since 2017 he has been a member of Bundestag.

Seitz grew up in Lahr in the Black Forest. He studied Law at Albert-Ludwigs-Universität Freiburg and University of Lausanne. He completed his legal clerkship at the Offenburg District Court. From 2008 until his election to the Bundestag, Seitz worked in Freiburg im Breisgau as a public prosecutor in the field of traffic law.

In 2010 he was a member of the right-wing party "Die Freiheit" ("German Freedom Party") for 10 months and became member of the AfD in spring 2013.

He left the AfD at the end of March 2024.
