= Kippenheim =

- Municipality
- Coat of arms

- Location of Kippenheim within Ortenaukreis district
- Interactive map of Kippenheim
- Location within Germany Location within Baden-Württemberg
- Coordinates: 48°17′41″N 07°49′17″E
- Country: Germany
- State: Baden-Württemberg
- Admin. region: Freiburg
- District: Ortenaukreis
- Subdivisions: 2 Ortsteile

Government
  - Mayor (2016–24): Matthias Gutbrod

Area
  - Total: 20.85 km^{2} (8.05 sq mi)
- Elevation: 170 m (560 ft)

Population (2025-12-31)
  - Total: 5,534
  - Density: 265.4/km^{2} (687.4/sq mi)
- Time zone: UTC+01:00 (CET)
  - Summer (DST): UTC+02:00 (CEST)
- Postal codes: 77971
- Dialling codes: 07825
- Vehicle registration: OG, BH, KEL, LR, WOL
- Website: www.kippenheim.de

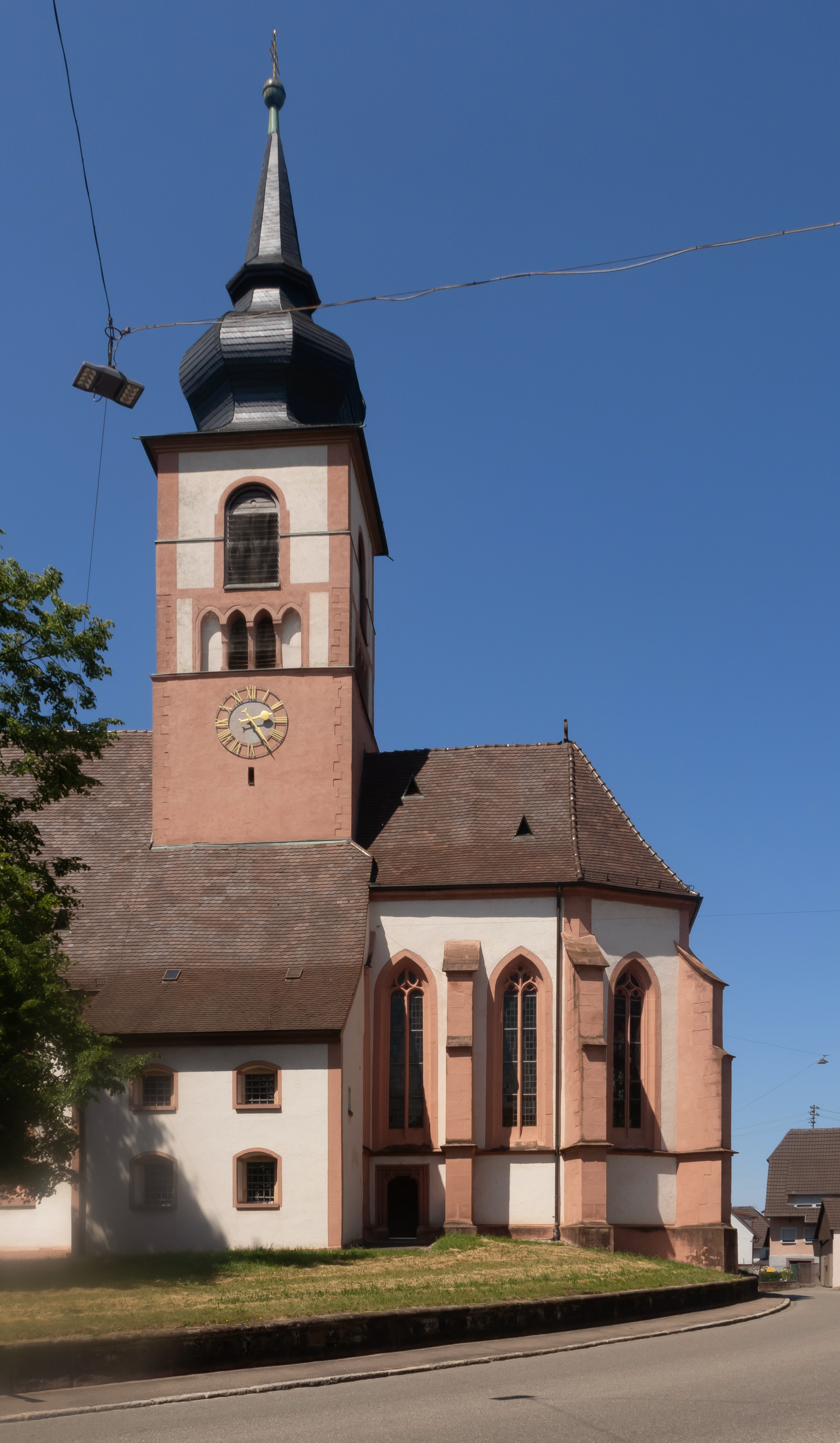
Church (Friedenskirche) in Kippenheim

Kippenheim (German pronunciation: [ˈkɪpn̩haɪm]; Low Alemannic: Kibbennä) is a municipality in the district of Ortenau in Baden-Württemberg in Germany.

Kippenheim has restored its pre-war synagogue.

== Notable residents ==
- Stef Wertheimer (born 1926), German-born Israeli entrepreneur, industrialist and politician
- Kurt Maier (born 1930), Kippenheimer Holocaust survivor and librarian.
- Inge Auerbacher (born 1934), Kippenheimer Holocaust survivor and chemist.

== Geographical Location ==
Kippenheim is located on the foothills of the Black Forest in the Upper Rhine Plain about 7 km south of Lahr.

== Demographics ==
Population development:

Year	Inhabitants
2012	5,259
2013	5,528
2014	5,327
2015	5,352
2016	5,474
2017	5,532
2018	5,545
2019	5,552
2020	5,547
2021	5,586

== History ==
As documented in the General State Archives in Karlsruhe, Kippenheim, then Chippinheim, was first mentioned in 763.

The Celts were probably the first to settle down in Kippenheim. The power of the Celtic tribes was broken by the Germans advancing from the North Sea region and the Roman attacks from the south.

Around the year 250 AD, the Alemanni broke through the border wall from the east and occupied the border area up to the Rhine, where most of the Alemannic villages probably came into being and probably also Kippenheim or Chippinheim, as it was first called around the turn of the century, the home of the Chippo, as what the Alemanni Chippo would suggest.

This village is officially mentioned for the first time when Pope Honorius III confirmed a donation in 1225. On December 1, 1146, the well-known church teacher Bernhard von Clairvaux called for the second crusade in the Kippenheim church.

As can be seen from a contract from 1367, at that time Kippenheim and Mahlberg formed a parish and a market cooperative. The present church itself, i.e. the choir and foundations of the nave, which was destroyed by fire in the early 18th century and rebuilt, date from around 1500. The massive tower is much older. Kippenheim had a certain ecclesiastical importance in the 16th and 17th centuries when it became a suburb of Protestantism under the rule of Mahlberg.

During the Thirty Years' War (1618-1648), the town of Kippenheim suffered primarily from the countless passages of Imperial and Protestant troops. Probably the blackest day in the history of the village was in 1677 when Kippenheim was destroyed by the French. Kippenheim was also affected by the subsequent wars.

Once again there was unrest in the country, namely at the time of the revolutionary years 1848/49, which also heated up the minds of the people of Kippenheim, but had no significant impact on life in the village. Finally, after the war of 1870/71, Kippenheim experienced new prosperity with the rise of the German Empire. But that only lasted until 1914. During the First World War, 51 Kippenheimers died on the battlefields. The villagers endured difficult years before things slowly started to improve again.

At the beginning of the National Socialist period, the call for a boycott on April 1, 1933, was only hesitantly followed, but in the following years the municipal council, which consisted only of NSDAP members, consistently pushed through anti-Jewish orders. The Second World War also claimed numerous victims in Kippenheim and ended in 1945 with total defeat. During the “Wagner-Bürckel Action” on October 22, 1940, the last Jews from Kippenheim were deported to the Gurs camp.

Kippenheim was spared the direct effects of war until the last year of the war, but in February and April, 1945 buildings were also destroyed here as a result of various attacks. The inhabitants found protection in bunkers and shelters in the Leimental and in the vineyards, so there were no major losses. In 1946, in gratitude for the fact that Kippenheim was protected from severe war damage, the chapel "Maria Frieden" was built on the Hohbühl, in the middle of the wine-growing region.

== Religions ==
Kippenheim is both Protestant and Roman Catholic. In addition to these congregations, there is also a New Apostolic church in town.

The Jewish community in Kippenheim existed until the Shoah. Albert Weill, the father of the composer Kurt Weill, came from here. The former synagogue in Kippenheim, in which a memorial commemorates the history of the Jewish community, can still be visited today. The friends' association of the former synagogue in Kippenheim keeps the memory of Kippenheim's Jewish history alive through events and guided tours through Kippenheim, Schmieheim, and the Kippenheim synagogue.

Since 2009, Kippenheim has been home to Wat Phra Dhammakaya Schwarzwald, a temple and meditation center of the Dhammakaya Buddhist movement from Thailand.
