= Steinach, Baden-Württemberg =

Steinach
- Municipality
- Coat of arms

- Location of Steinach within Ortenaukreis district
- Interactive map of Steinach
- Location within Germany Location within Baden-Württemberg
- Coordinates: 48°18′16″N 8°3′22″E
- Country: Germany
- State: Baden-Württemberg
- Admin. region: Freiburg
- District: Ortenaukreis

Government
  - Mayor (2017–25): Nicolai Bischler

Area
  - Total: 33.32 km^{2} (12.86 sq mi)
- Elevation: 205 m (673 ft)

Population (2025-12-31)
  - Total: 3,884
  - Density: 116.6/km^{2} (301.9/sq mi)
- Time zone: UTC+01:00 (CET)
  - Summer (DST): UTC+02:00 (CEST)
- Postal codes: 77790
- Dialling codes: 07832
- Vehicle registration: OG, BH, KEL, LR, WOL
- Website: www.steinach.de

Steinach (German pronunciation: [ˈʃtaɪnax]) is a municipality in the district of Ortenau in Baden-Württemberg in Germany.

== Notable people ==
- George Schoener (1864–1941), priest and rose breeder
