= Ortenaukreis =

Coordinates: 48°25′N 8°00′E

- District
- Flag Coat of arms
- Country: Germany
- State: Baden-Württemberg
- Adm. region: Freiburg
- Capital: Offenburg

Government
  - District admin.: Frank Scherer

Area
  - Total: 1,860.74 km^{2} (718.44 sq mi)

Population (31 December 2024)
  - Total: 444,858
  - Density: 239.076/km^{2} (619.204/sq mi)
- Time zone: UTC+01:00 (CET)
  - Summer (DST): UTC+02:00 (CEST)
- Vehicle registration: OG, BH, KEL, LR, WOL
- Website: www.ortenaukreis.de

Ortenaukreis (Low Alemannic: Ortenaukrais; French: Arrondissement de l'Ortenau) is a Landkreis (district) in the west of Baden-Württemberg, Germany. Neighboring districts are (clockwise from north) Rastatt, Freudenstadt, Rottweil, Schwarzwald-Baar and Emmendingen. To the west it borders the French Bas-Rhin département.

== History ==
The district was created in 1973 by merging the districts of Kehl, Lahr, Offenburg, Wolfach and the southern part of the district of Bühl.

== Geography ==
The western part of the district is located in the Upper Rhine Valley, the eastern part belongs to the northern Black Forest. The highest elevation of the district, the Hornisgrinde (1164 m), is located in the north-east of the district. The lowest elevation (124.3 m) is in the Rhine valley to the north. The district is named after the historical territory of the Ortenau.

== Partnerships ==
The district has a friendship with the Altenburger Land district in Thuringia. Offenburg district already had a city partnership with Altenburg so, after German reunification in 1990, Ortenaukreis chose to help modernize the Altenburger Land administration to the West German standard.

France and Germany have created the Strasbourg-Ortenau eurodistrict straddling the Rhine and combining Ortenaukreis and Greater Strasbourg, with an overall population of 950,000.

== Coat of arms ==
The coat of arms is identical with that of the former Offenburg district, and is based on the coat of arms of the Ortenau canton of the League of Imperial Knights. It shows an imperial eagle with two heads, which also stands for the free imperial cities of Offenburg, Gengenbach and Zell. In an escutcheon on the breast of the eagle is the patron Saint George, depicted killing the dragon.

== Cities and municipalities ==
Clickable map of towns and municipalities in Ortenaukreis

Cities
1. Achern
2. Ettenheim
3. Gengenbach
4. Haslach (Kinzigtal)
5. Hausach
6. Hornberg
7. Kehl
8. Lahr (Schwarzwald)
9. Mahlberg
10. Oberkirch
11. Offenburg
12. Oppenau
13. Renchen
14. Rheinau (Baden)
15. Wolfach
16. Zell am Harmersbach
Administrative districts
1. Achern
2. Ettenheim
3. Gengenbach
4. Haslach
5. Hausach
6. Kappelrodeck
7. Lahr
8. Oberes Renchtal
9. Oberkirch
10. Offenburg
11. Seelbach
12. Schwanau
13. Wolfach
14. Zell
Municipalities
1. Appenweier
2. Bad Peterstal-Griesbach
3. Berghaupten
4. Biberach (Baden)
5. Durbach
6. Fischerbach
7. Friesenheim
8. Gutach (Schwarzwaldbahn)
9. Hofstetten
10. Hohberg
11. Kappel-Grafenhausen
12. Kappelrodeck
13. Kippenheim
14. Lauf (Baden)
15. Lautenbach
16. Meißenheim
17. Mühlenbach
18. Neuried

19. Nordrach
20. Oberharmersbach
21. Oberwolfach
22. Ohlsbach
23. Ortenberg
24. Ottenhöfen
25. Ringsheim
26. Rust (Baden)
27. Sasbach
28. Sasbachwalden
29. Schuttertal
30. Schutterwald
31. Schwanau
32. Seebach
33. Seelbach
34. Steinach
35. Willstätt
