= Hofstetten, Baden-Württemberg =

Hofstetten
- Municipality
- Coat of arms

- Location of Hofstetten within Ortenaukreis district
- Interactive map of Hofstetten
- Location within Germany Location within Baden-Württemberg
- Coordinates: 48°15′29″N 08°03′57″E
- Country: Germany
- State: Baden-Württemberg
- Admin. region: Freiburg
- District: Ortenaukreis

Government
  - Mayor (2018–26): Martin Aßmuth

Area
  - Total: 18.16 km^{2} (7.01 sq mi)
- Elevation: 259 m (850 ft)

Population (2025-12-31)
  - Total: 1,752
  - Density: 96.48/km^{2} (249.9/sq mi)
- Time zone: UTC+01:00 (CET)
  - Summer (DST): UTC+02:00 (CEST)
- Postal codes: 77716
- Dialling codes: 07832
- Vehicle registration: OG, BH, KEL, LR, WOL
- Website: www.hofstetten-schwarzwald.de

Hofstetten (German pronunciation: [hoːfˈʃtɛtn̩]; Low Alemannic: Hoofschdäddä) is a municipality in the district of Ortenau in Baden-Württemberg in Germany.
