= Schuttertal =

- Municipality
- Coat of arms

- Location of Schuttertal within Ortenaukreis district
- Interactive map of Schuttertal
- Location within Germany Location within Baden-Württemberg
- Coordinates: 48°14′50″N 07°57′14″E
- Country: Germany
- State: Baden-Württemberg
- Admin. region: Freiburg
- District: Ortenaukreis
- Subdivisions: 3 Ortsteile

Government
  - Mayor (2020–28): Matthias Litterst (CDU)

Area
  - Total: 50.27 km^{2} (19.41 sq mi)
- Elevation: 245 m (804 ft)

Population (2025-12-31)
  - Total: 3,140
  - Density: 62.5/km^{2} (162/sq mi)
- Time zone: UTC+01:00 (CET)
  - Summer (DST): UTC+02:00 (CEST)
- Postal codes: 77978
- Dialling codes: 07826
- Vehicle registration: OG, BH, KEL, LR, WOL
- Website: www.schuttertal.de

Schuttertal (German pronunciation: [ˈʃʊtɐtaːl], lit. 'Schutter Valley') is a municipality in Baden-Württemberg, Germany and belongs to the district of Ortenau. It is located in the Schutter Valley in Black Forest.

Schuttertal was founded from the three towns Schuttertal, Dörlinbach and Schweighausen in the district reform of 1974.
