= Friesenheim (Baden-Württemberg) =

German municipality

- Municipality
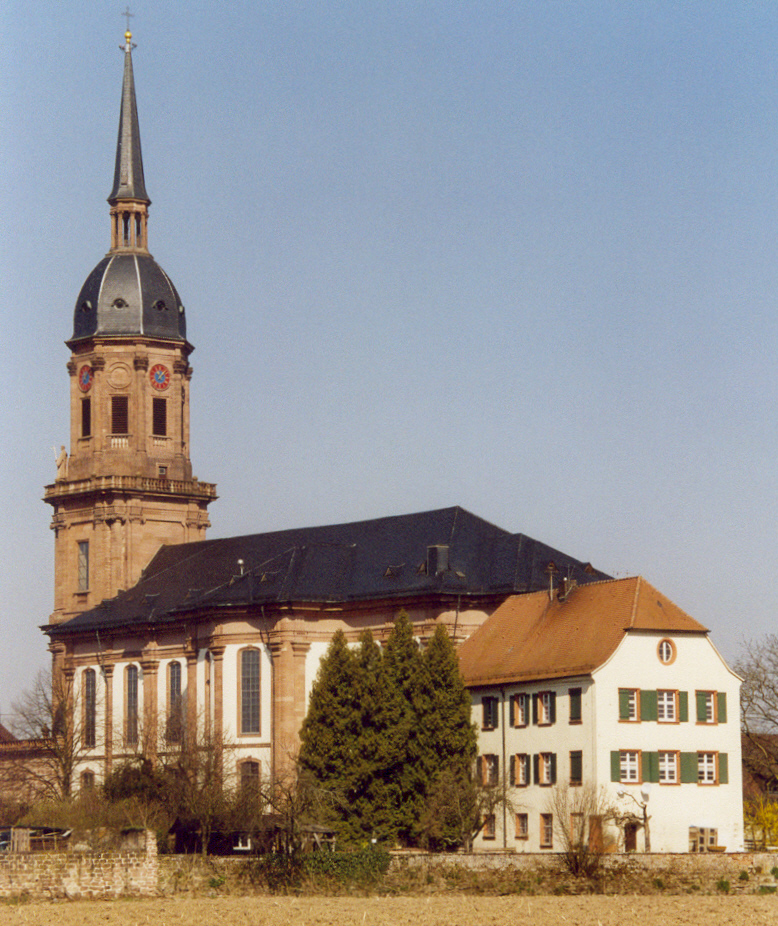
- The Schuttern Abbey

- Coat of arms

- Location of Friesenheim within Ortenaukreis district
- Interactive map of Friesenheim
- Location within Germany Location within Baden-Württemberg
- Coordinates: 48°22′23″N 07°53′00″E
- Country: Germany
- State: Baden-Württemberg
- Admin. region: Freiburg
- District: Ortenaukreis

Government
  - Mayor (2024–32): Erik Weide

Area
  - Total: 46.60 km^{2} (17.99 sq mi)
- Elevation: 159 m (522 ft)

Population (2025-12-31)
  - Total: 13,884
  - Density: 297.9/km^{2} (771.7/sq mi)
- Time zone: UTC+01:00 (CET)
  - Summer (DST): UTC+02:00 (CEST)
- Postal codes: 77948
- Dialling codes: 07821, 07808 (Oberschopfheim)
- Vehicle registration: OG, BH, KEL, LR, WOL
- Website: www.friesenheim.de

Friesenheim (German pronunciation: [ˈfʁiːzn̩haɪm]; Low Alemannic: Friäsenä) is a municipality in the Ortenau district of Baden-Württemberg, Germany.

== History ==
Friesenheim was mediatized to the Grand Duchy of Baden in 1803. It was assigned to the district of Lahr. That district was dissolved as part of the 1973 Baden-Württemberg district reform. Friesenheim was subsequently assigned to the newly organized Ortenau district. From 1972 to 1975, Friesenheim absorbed the towns of Heiligenzell, Oberschopfheim, Oberweier, and Schuttern.

== Geography ==
The municipality (Gemeinde) of Friesenheim is located in the Ortenau district of Baden-Württemberg, one of the 16 States of the Federal Republic of Germany.

== Politics ==
Friesenheim has five boroughs (Ortsteile) – Friesenheim, Heiligenzell, Oberschopfheim, Oberweier, and Schuttern – and two villages: Leutkirche and Riedmühle. Also located in the municipal area is the Am Bahnhof industrial district and the abandoned villages of Leimbach, Schutterweiler, and Sternenberg.

=== Coat of arms ===
Friesenheim's municipal coat of arms is divided party per pale into a right, yellow half containing a red plowshare, and a red half with a white billhook. This coat of arms was first designed by the Karlsruhe General State Archives in 1900 and accepted by the municipal council and was retained after the mergers of the 1970s. The Ortenau district office reapproved the coat of arms for municipal use and issued a corresponding flag to Friesenheim on 8 August 1977.

== Transportation ==
Friesenheim is connected to Germany's network of roadways by the Bundesstraße 3 and its railway system by the Mannheim–Karlsruhe–Basel railway.
