= Fischerbach =

- Municipality
- Coat of arms

- Location of Fischerbach within Ortenaukreis district
- Interactive map of Fischerbach
- Location within Germany Location within Baden-Württemberg
- Coordinates: 48°17′14″N 8°6′33″E
- Country: Germany
- State: Baden-Württemberg
- Admin. region: Freiburg
- District: Ortenaukreis

Government
  - Mayor (2016–24): Thomas Schneider

Area
  - Total: 20.29 km^{2} (7.83 sq mi)
- Elevation: 276 m (906 ft)

Population (2025-12-31)
  - Total: 1,717
  - Density: 84.62/km^{2} (219.2/sq mi)
- Time zone: UTC+01:00 (CET)
  - Summer (DST): UTC+02:00 (CEST)
- Postal codes: 77716
- Dialling codes: 07832
- Vehicle registration: OG, BH, KEL, LR, WOL
- Website: www.fischerbach.de

Fischerbach (German pronunciation: [ˈfɪʃɐbax]) is a municipality in the district of Ortenau in Baden-Württemberg in Germany.

== History ==
The town was first registered in 1139. The village was part of the Gengenbach monastery and the "Herren von Wolfach" (a noble family first registered in 1084) and later became part of the Fürstenberg shire. In 1806, Fischerbach became part of Baden, and since 1973, Fischerbach has been part of the district of Ortenau. Administratively Fischerbach is autonomous.

== Education ==
Fischerbach has a kindergarten and elementary as well as a secondary school.
