= Johannes Fechner =

German politician (born 1975)

Johannes Fechner MdB
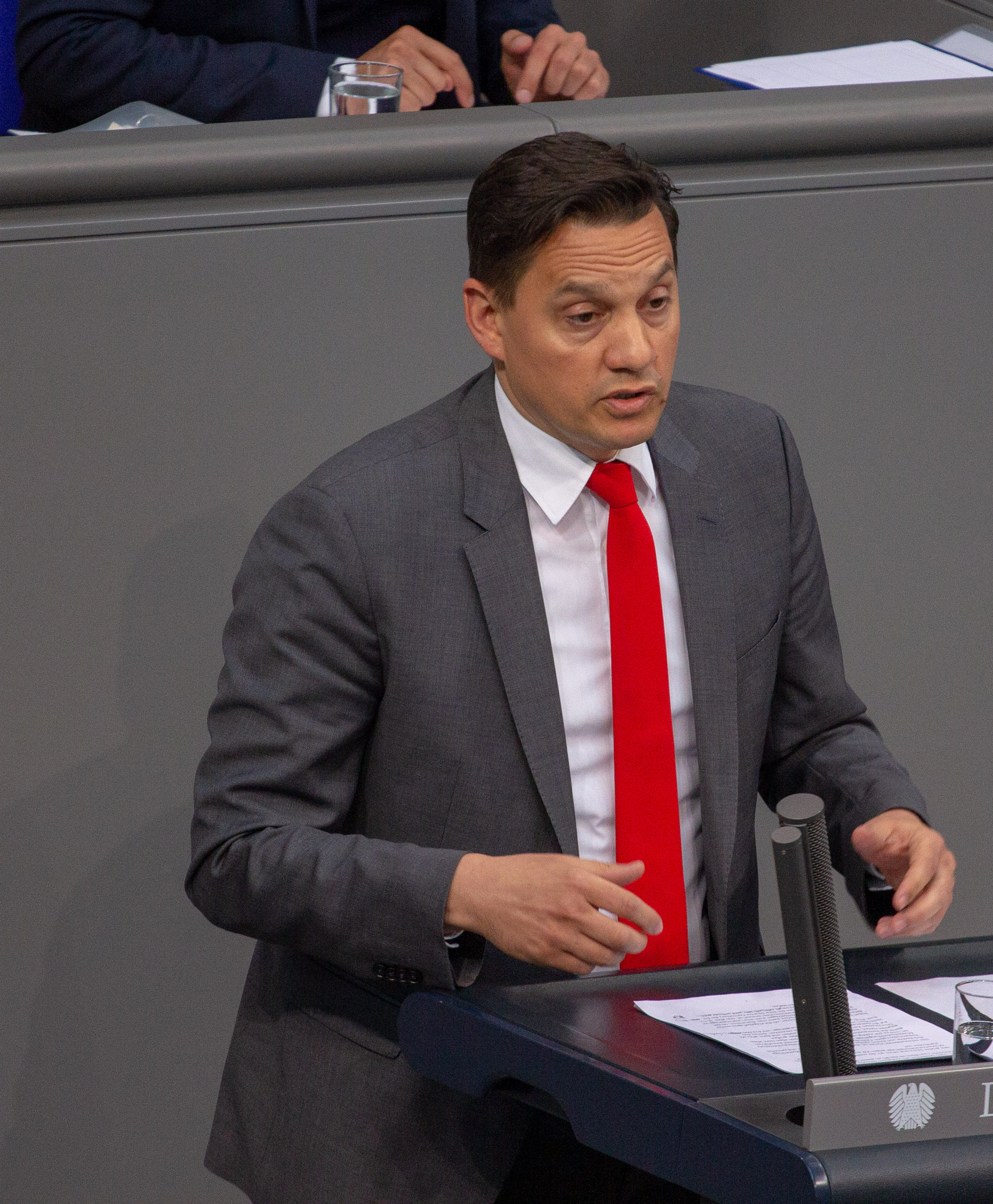
- Fechner in 2019

Member of the Bundestag; from Baden-Württemberg
- Incumbent
- Assumed office 22 October 2013
- Constituency: State list

Personal details
- Born: 25 November 1972 (age 53) Freiburg, West Germany
- Party: Social Democratic
- Children: 2
- Education: University of Freiburg

Johannes Fechner (born 25 November 1972) is a German lawyer and politician of the Social Democratic Party (SPD) who has been serving as a member of the Bundestag from the state of Baden-Württemberg since 2013.

== Political career ==
Fechner became a member of the Bundestag in the 2013 German federal election. He has since been a member of the Committee on Legal Affairs and Consumer Protection. From 2014 to 2021, he served as his parliamentary group's spokesperson on legal affairs.

Fechner has also served on its Subcommittee on European Affairs (2014-2017), the Committee for the Scrutiny of Elections, Immunity and the Rules of Procedure (2014-2017) and the Committee for the Scrutiny of Acoustic Surveillance of the Private Home (since 2018). In 2018, he joined the parliamentary body in charge of appointing judges to the Highest Courts of Justice, namely the Federal Court of Justice (BGH), the Federal Administrative Court (BVerwG), the Federal Fiscal Court (BFH), the Federal Labour Court (BAG), and the Federal Social Court (BSG). He has also been serving on the Committee on the Election of Judges (Wahlausschuss), which is in charge of appointing judges to the Federal Constitutional Court of Germany.

In the negotiations to form a fourth coalition government under the leadership of Chancellor Angela Merkel following the 2017 federal elections, Fechner was part of the working group on internal and legal affairs, led by Thomas de Maizière, Stephan Mayer and Heiko Maas.

In the negotiations to form a so-called traffic light coalition of the SPD, the Green Party and the Free Democrats (FDP) following the 2021 German elections, Fechner was part of his party's delegation in the working group on homeland security, civil rights and consumer protection, co-chaired by Christine Lambrecht, Konstantin von Notz and Wolfgang Kubicki.

Since the 2021 elections, Fechner has been serving as his parliamentary group’s spokesperson for the scrutiny of elections, immunity and the rules of procedure. From 2022 to 2023, he co-chaired – alongside Nina Warken – the Commission for the Reform of the Electoral Law and the Modernization of Parliamentary Work.
