= Mühlenbach, Baden-Württemberg =

Mühlenbach
- Municipality
- Coat of arms

- Location of Mühlenbach within Ortenaukreis district
- Interactive map of Mühlenbach
- Location within Germany Location within Baden-Württemberg
- Coordinates: 48°15′11″N 08°06′38″E
- Country: Germany
- State: Baden-Württemberg
- Admin. region: Freiburg
- District: Ortenaukreis

Government
  - Mayor (2017–25): Helga Wössner

Area
  - Total: 31.22 km^{2} (12.05 sq mi)
- Elevation: 260 m (850 ft)

Population (2025-12-31)
  - Total: 1,635
  - Density: 52.37/km^{2} (135.6/sq mi)
- Time zone: UTC+01:00 (CET)
  - Summer (DST): UTC+02:00 (CEST)
- Postal codes: 77796
- Dialling codes: 07832
- Vehicle registration: OG, BH, KEL, LR, WOL
- Website: www.muehlenbach.de

Mühlenbach (German pronunciation: [ˈmyːlənbax]; Low Alemannic: Miiläbach) is a town in the district of Ortenau in Baden-Württemberg in Germany.

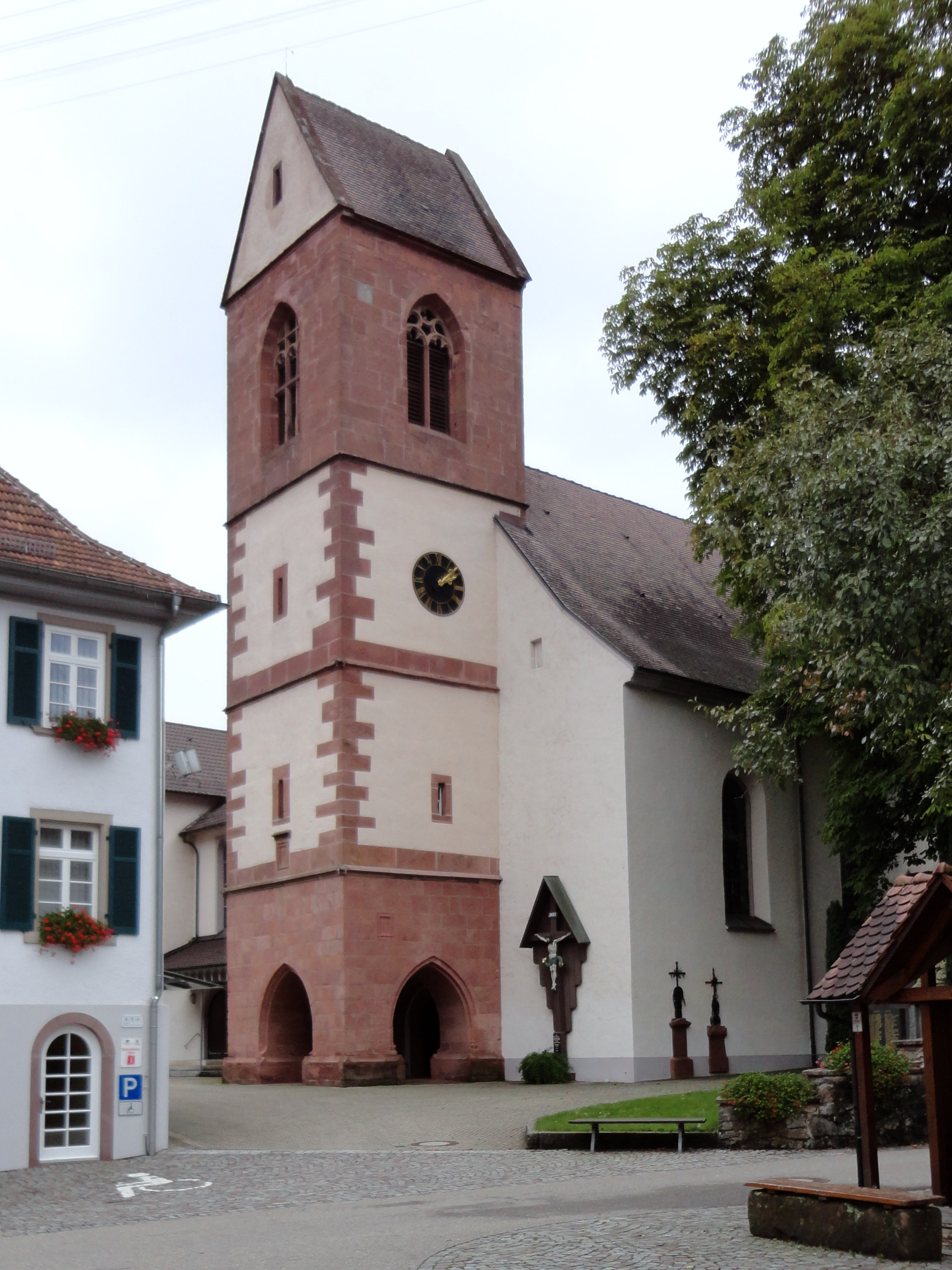
St. Afra at Mühlenbach

== Demographics ==
Population development:

Year	Inhabitants
1990	1,542
2001	1,702
2011	1,674
2021	1,682
