= Kappel-Grafenhausen =

- Municipality
- Coat of arms

- Location of Kappel-Grafenhausen within Ortenaukreis district
- Interactive map of Kappel-Grafenhausen
- Location within Germany Location within Baden-Württemberg
- Coordinates: 48°17′32″N 07°44′29″E
- Country: Germany
- State: Baden-Württemberg
- Admin. region: Freiburg
- District: Ortenaukreis

Government
  - Mayor (2023–31): Philipp Klotz

Area
  - Total: 25.72 km^{2} (9.93 sq mi)
- Elevation: 163 m (535 ft)

Population (2025-12-31)
  - Total: 5,280
  - Density: 205/km^{2} (532/sq mi)
- Time zone: UTC+01:00 (CET)
  - Summer (DST): UTC+02:00 (CEST)
- Postal codes: 77966
- Dialling codes: 07822
- Vehicle registration: OG, BH, KEL, LR, WOL
- Website: www.kappel-grafenhausen.de

Kappel-Grafenhausen (Low Alemannic: Kabbl-Groffähüüsä) is a town in the district of Ortenau in Baden-Württemberg in Germany, within the administrative region of Freiburg. Nestled between the Black Forest and the Vosges Mountains. The village spans about 2,600 hectares, which includes residential, transportation, forested areas, and water bodies. The highest elevation point reaches over 522 meters above sea level, while the lowest is around 155 meters

As of the end of 2022, Kappel-Grafenhausen had a population of 5,346, divided between its two main areas: Kappel, with 2,806 residents, and Grafenhausen, with 2,540. The municipality is well-connected, located near the A5 motorway that links Karlsruhe and Basel, and accessible via local rail and bus lines.

== Demographics ==
Population development:

Year	Inhabitants
2015	4,963
2016	4,973
2017	5,009
2018	5,096
2019	5,016
2020	5,140
