= Meißenheim =

- Municipality
- Coat of arms

- Location of Meißenheim within Ortenaukreis district
- Interactive map of Meißenheim
- Location within Germany Location within Baden-Württemberg
- Coordinates: 48°24′36″N 07°46′25″E
- Country: Germany
- State: Baden-Württemberg
- Admin. region: Freiburg
- District: Ortenaukreis

Government
  - Mayor (2017–25): Alexander Schröder

Area
  - Total: 21.33 km^{2} (8.24 sq mi)
- Elevation: 151 m (495 ft)

Population (2025-12-31)
  - Total: 4,177
  - Density: 195.8/km^{2} (507.2/sq mi)
- Time zone: UTC+01:00 (CET)
  - Summer (DST): UTC+02:00 (CEST)
- Postal codes: 77974
- Dialling codes: 07824
- Vehicle registration: OG, BH, KEL, LR, WOL
- Website: www.meissenheim.de

Meißenheim (pronounced [ˈmaɪsn̩haɪm]; Low Alemannic: Missennä) is a municipality in the district of Ortenau in Baden-Württemberg in Germany.

== Demographics ==
Population development:

Year	Inhabitants
1990	3,092
2001	3,583
2011	3,748
2021	4,073

== Personalities ==
=== Sons and daughters of the place ===
- Ferdinand Kopf (1857–1943), born in Kürzell, lawyer, member of parliament
- Karl Hoppe (1889–1963), politician (Social Democratic Party of Germany, Communist Party of the Saar), member of the Saarland Parliament 1947–1952

=== Other personalities related to the place ===
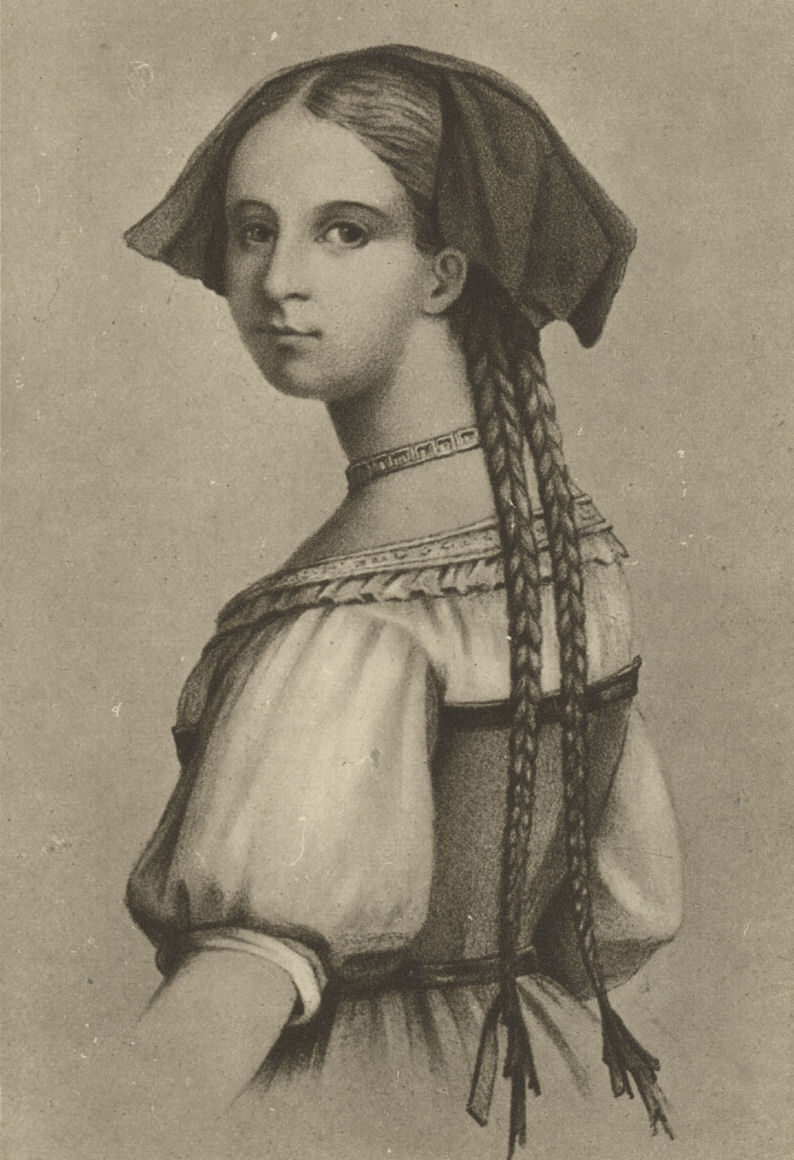
Friederike Brion

- Friederike Brion (1752–1813), the youthful love of Goethe was buried in Meißenheim
