= Ringsheim =

- Municipality
- Coat of arms

- Location of Ringsheim within Ortenaukreis district
- Interactive map of Ringsheim
- Location within Germany Location within Baden-Württemberg
- Coordinates: 48°14′51″N 07°46′44″E
- Country: Germany
- State: Baden-Württemberg
- Admin. region: Freiburg
- District: Ortenaukreis

Government
  - Mayor (2017–25): Pascal Weber

Area
  - Total: 11.31 km^{2} (4.37 sq mi)
- Elevation: 169 m (554 ft)

Population (2025-12-31)
  - Total: 2,810
  - Density: 248/km^{2} (643/sq mi)
- Time zone: UTC+01:00 (CET)
  - Summer (DST): UTC+02:00 (CEST)
- Postal codes: 77975
- Dialling codes: 07822
- Vehicle registration: OG, BH, KEL, LR, WOL
- Website: www.ringsheim.de

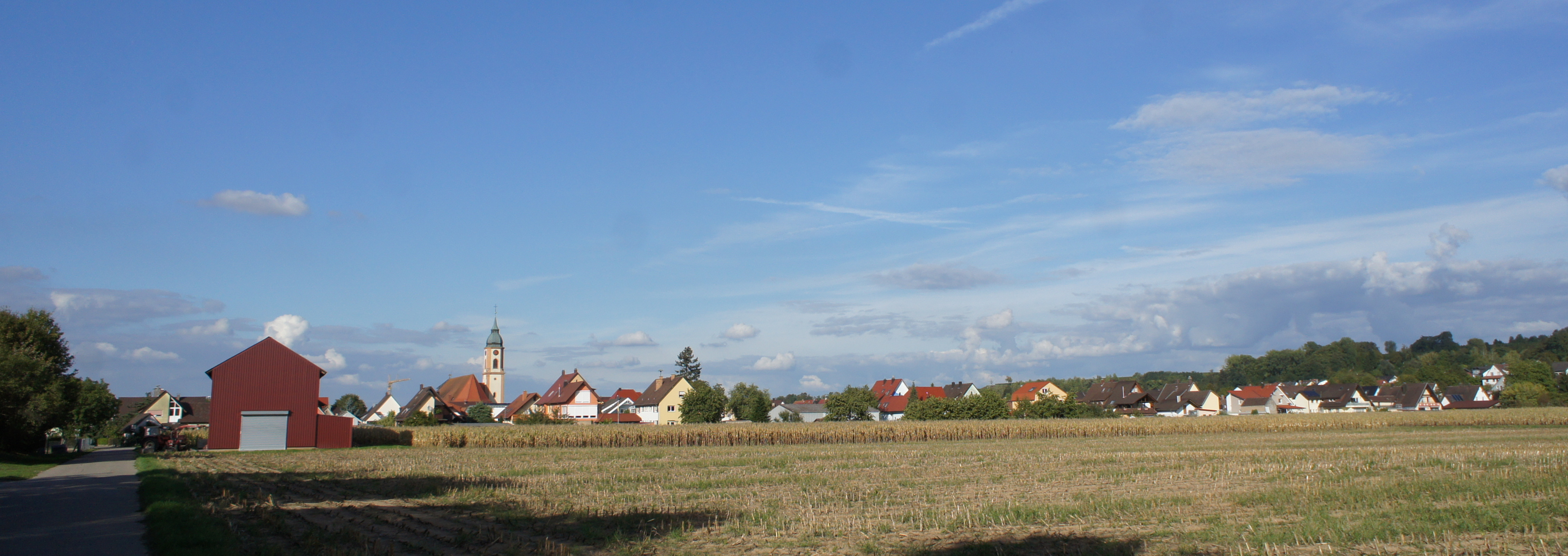
Ringsheim view from south

Ringsheim (German pronunciation: [ˈʁɪŋshaɪm]; Low Alemannic: Ringsä) is a municipality in the district of Ortenau in Baden-Württemberg in Germany.

The village is served by Ringsheim/Europa-Park station.
