= Mahlberg =

- City
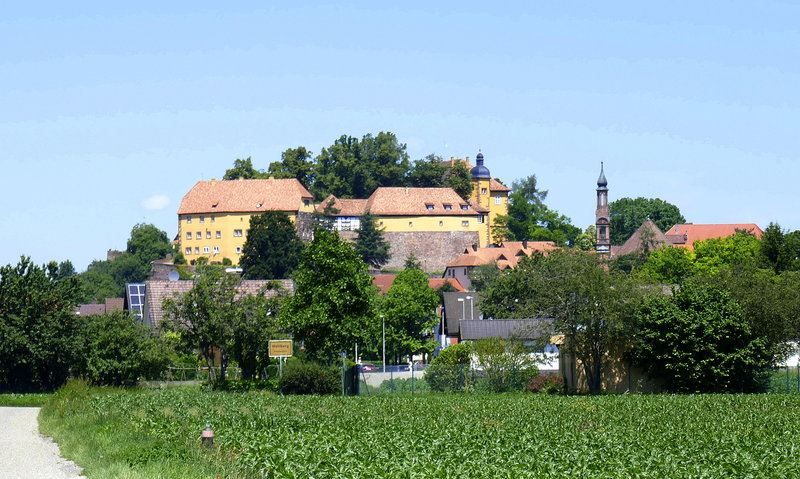

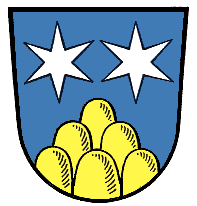
- Coat of arms

- Location of Mahlberg within Ortenaukreis district
- Interactive map of Mahlberg
- Location within Germany Location within Baden-Württemberg
- Coordinates: 48°17′13″N 07°48′41″E
- Country: Germany
- State: Baden-Württemberg
- Admin. region: Freiburg
- District: Ortenaukreis

Government
  - Mayor (2018–26): Dietmar Benz

Area
  - Total: 16.59 km^{2} (6.41 sq mi)
- Elevation: 180 m (590 ft)

Population (2025-12-31)
  - Total: 5,239
  - Density: 315.8/km^{2} (817.9/sq mi)
- Time zone: UTC+01:00 (CET)
  - Summer (DST): UTC+02:00 (CEST)
- Postal codes: 77972
- Dialling codes: 07825
- Vehicle registration: OG, BH, KEL, LR, WOL
- Website: www.mahlberg.de

Mahlberg (German pronunciation: [ˈmaːlbɛʁk]; Low Alemannic: Mohlburg) is a city in the Ortenaukreis, in western Baden-Württemberg, Germany. It is situated 8 km southwest of Lahr, near the Europa-Park Rust. It is about 30 kilometres (20 mi) north of Freiburg im Breisgau and 30 km (20 mi) south of Strasbourg. It is in the Upper Rhine Trinational Metropolitan Region, a region combining Alsace (France) and parts of Switzerland and Southwest-Germany.

== History ==
Until the 19th century Mahlberg was first mentioned in 1215. As early as 1223, the town was granted city rights by Emperor Friedrich II. At that time Mahlberg was an imperial castle and the seat of an imperial school. At that time the place belonged to the domain of the Lords of Geroldseck. After their extinction in the middle of the 15th century, the city came to the Margraviate of Baden-Baden, whereby a common rule was agreed with the counts of Nassau-Saarbrücken. After the joint ownership of Baden and Nassau was dissolved in 1629, the city then became a center of Baden-Baden rule.

After the Reichsdeputationshauptschluss, Mahlberg became the seat of the eponymous Oberamt, which belonged to the Landvogtei Hochberg. In 1806 it was subordinated directly to the province of Middle Rhine as a sovereign office. When it was reorganized in 1809, it was subordinated to the Kinzigkreis with headquarters in Offenburg as Mahlberg. Finally, the Mahlberg office was merged with the Ettenheim office in 1813. The new office was based in Ettenheim. From this point on, Mahlberg was no longer a city in the administrative history of Baden. In 1900, 962 mostly Catholic residents lived in Mahlberg. Since 1924 the city belonged to the district office of Lahr, which in 1939 became the district of Lahr.

=== 20th century ===
In 1935, Mahlberg lost its city rights in the course of the National Socialist central administrative "cleanup", but was given it back in 1950 after the then Prime Minister of Baden, Leo Wohleb (before Baden-Wuerttemberg was founded). With the dissolution of the district of Lahr, Mahlberg fell to the new Ortenaukreis.

== Geography ==
=== Incorporations ===
The previously independent municipality of Orschweier was incorporated into the city of Mahlberg on October 1, 1973 as part of the municipal reform in Baden-Württemberg. This was preceded by - ultimately unsuccessful - negotiations with the neighboring communities of Ettenheim and Kippenheim.

==== Neighboring Communities ====
Immediate neighboring municipalities are Kippenheim in the north (followed by Lahr), Kappel-Grafenhausen in the west beyond the federal highway 5 and Ettenheim in the southeast (with Altdorf).

==== City Arrangement ====
Mahlberg includes the formerly independent municipality of Orschweier, in which about a third of the total population lives. The town of Mahlberg and the Allmendhöfe homestead belong to the town of Mahlberg in the boundaries of September 30, 1973. The former municipality of Orschweier includes the village of Orschweier south of Mahlberg and the Orschweier train station. In the district of Mahlberg was the village of Altenmahlberg, which emerged in Mahlberg.

A few years ago, an inter-communal industrial area called "DYNA5" was also identified and developed with the neighboring community of Ettenheim.

==== Climate ====
Mahlberg is in a zone with warm and humid oceanic climate. The climate in this region shows slight differences between highs and lows, and there is sufficient rainfall throughout the year. However, it quickly becomes a "humid subtropical climate" since the average temperatures in July and August are just under 22 °C. Most precipitation falls in May, while late summer months almost have a Mediterranean climate with light rainfall. Mahlberg currently falls in one of the warmest regions in Germany with an average annual temperature of 11.9 °C.

Climate data for Mahlberg (CFB Lahr) 2015-2020 Extremes; High, Low, Mean Temperatures with precipitation + Sunny days
Month	Jan	Feb	Mar	Apr	May	Jun	Jul	Aug	Sep	Oct	Nov	Dec	Year
Record high °C (°F)	15.7 (60.3)	20.5 (68.9)	24.4 (75.9)	29.8 (85.6)	32.8 (91.0)	37.0 (98.6)	38.4 (101.1)	39.5 (103.1)	32.2 (90.0)	27.7 (81.9)	23.0 (73.4)	16.9 (62.4)	39.5 (103.1)
Mean daily maximum °C (°F)	6.1 (43.0)	7.8 (46.0)	12.5 (54.5)	17.0 (62.6)	20.7 (69.3)	25.2 (77.4)	28.0 (82.4)	27.2 (81.0)	22.5 (72.5)	16.3 (61.3)	10.5 (50.9)	7.6 (45.7)	16.8 (62.2)
Daily mean °C (°F)	3.1 (37.6)	3.7 (38.7)	7.3 (45.1)	11.0 (51.8)	15.1 (59.2)	19.5 (67.1)	21.7 (71.1)	20.5 (68.9)	16.0 (60.8)	11.1 (52.0)	6.8 (44.2)	4.5 (40.1)	11.65 (52.97)
Mean daily minimum °C (°F)	−0.3 (31.5)	−0.4 (31.3)	2 (36)	4.7 (40.5)	9.3 (48.7)	13.5 (56.3)	15.0 (59.0)	14.1 (57.4)	10.0 (50.0)	6.3 (43.3)	2.8 (37.0)	1.1 (34.0)	6.5 (43.7)
Record low °C (°F)	−11.8 (10.8)	−12.6 (9.3)	−4.9 (23.2)	−2.8 (27.0)	1.1 (34.0)	6.1 (43.0)	6.4 (43.5)	6.5 (43.7)	1.2 (34.2)	−2.1 (28.2)	−7.2 (19.0)	−6.7 (19.9)	−12.6 (9.3)
Average precipitation mm (inches)	60 (2.4)	40 (1.6)	42 (1.7)	66 (2.6)	108 (4.3)	69 (2.7)	58 (2.3)	49 (1.9)	45 (1.8)	44 (1.7)	49 (1.9)	46 (1.8)	676 (26.6)
Average rainy days (≥ 0.2 mm)	18	13	13	14	15	13	12	11	10	11	14	16	160
Average snowy days (≥ 0.2 cm)	2	1	1	1	0	0	0	0	0	0	1	1	7
Average relative humidity (%)	87	84	77	72	73	73	73	76	80	86	85	87	79
Mean monthly sunshine hours	53	95	152	193	216	244	274	244	196	109	63	56	1,895
Source: Wetterdienst

== Personalities ==
=== Sons and daughters of the town ===
- Friedrich Karl of Landolin Blittersdorf (1792–1861), Baden official
- Fidel Binz (1850–1920), sculptor Baden
- Karl Kromer (1865–1939), composer and musician
- Josef Loreye (1767–1844), Roman Catholic priest, director of Lyceum in Rastatt

=== Other famous residents ===
- Johann Heinrich David Henn Hofer (1793–1850), Baden diplomat, lived retired temporarily in Mahlberg.
- Wolfram Siebeck (1928–2016), columnist and food critic, had one of his residences in Mahlberg castle since the late 1980s.
- Christina Obergföll (born 1981), javelin thrower, world champion 2013 World Championships in Athletics in Moscow, European record in the javelin
