= Seelbach, Baden-Württemberg =

Seelbach
- Municipality
- Coat of arms

- Location of Seelbach within Ortenaukreis district
- Interactive map of Seelbach
- Location within Germany Location within Baden-Württemberg
- Coordinates: 48°18′51″N 07°56′29″E
- Country: Germany
- State: Baden-Württemberg
- Admin. region: Freiburg
- District: Ortenaukreis

Government
  - Mayor (2023–31): Michael Moser

Area
  - Total: 29.83 km^{2} (11.52 sq mi)
- Elevation: 286 m (938 ft)

Population (2025-12-31)
  - Total: 4,781
  - Density: 160.3/km^{2} (415.1/sq mi)
- Time zone: UTC+01:00 (CET)
  - Summer (DST): UTC+02:00 (CEST)
- Postal codes: 77960
- Dialling codes: 07823
- Vehicle registration: OG, BH, KEL, LR, WOL
- Website: seelbach-online.de

Seelbach (German pronunciation: [ˈzeːlbax]) is a municipality in the district of Ortenau in Baden-Württemberg in Germany. The most popular Festival is the Katharinenmarkt on November.

== Geography ==
Seelbach is located on the western edge of the Black Forest in the Schutter Valley, south-eastern of Lahr.

=== Neighboring communities ===
The following cities and towns share a border with Seelbach. They are listed clockwise starting in the north: Friesenheim, Biberach, Schuttertal, Ettenheim, Kippenheim and Lahr.

=== The boroughs ===
There are three boroughs, Seelbach, Wittelbach and Schönberg.

== Government ==
=== Town council ===
After the last election in June 2009, the town council consists of 18 seats. The members belong to political parties as follows

Party	Seats
CDU	7
FBI	6
SPD	5

=== Mayor ===
The mayor is elected by the citizens for a term of 8 years. He's also the head of the town council.

Mayors since 1831

- 1831–1832: Vogt Schöttgen (signs the first time with „Bürgermeister“)
- 1832–1838: Karl Obert
- 1838–1844: Michael Schäfer
- 1849–1875: Xaver Räpple
- 1875–1886: Franz Anton Benz
- 1886–1910: Christian Himmelsbach
- 1910–1919: Josef Heizmann
- 1919–1923: Wilhelm Brucker
- 1923–1945: Theodor Simon
- 1945–1946: Georg Hartmann
- 1946–1948: Alfred Himmelsbach
- 1948–1957: Josef Fehrenbach
- 1957–1977: Alfred Dreyer
- 1977–1993: Walter Dilger
- 1993–2007: Klaus Muttach
- 2008–2023: Thomas Schäfer
- 2023–present: Michael Moser

== People, culture & architecture ==
=== Events ===
The Katharinenmarkt is a weekend long historic market that takes place annually in November since 1455. It is visited by nearly 20000 visitors.

== Twin town ==
Seelbach is twinned with Zillebeke in the Flemish province of West Flanders in Belgium.
