= Schwanau, Baden-Württemberg =

Schwanau
- Municipality
- Coat of arms

- Location of Schwanau within Ortenaukreis district
- Interactive map of Schwanau
- Location within Germany Location within Baden-Württemberg
- Coordinates: 48°21′N 7°46′E
- Country: Germany
- State: Baden-Württemberg
- Admin. region: Freiburg
- District: Ortenaukreis

Government
  - Mayor (2022–30): Marco Gutmann

Area
  - Total: 38.35 km^{2} (14.81 sq mi)
- Elevation: 153 m (502 ft)

Population (2025-12-31)
  - Total: 7,057
  - Density: 184.0/km^{2} (476.6/sq mi)
- Time zone: UTC+01:00 (CET)
  - Summer (DST): UTC+02:00 (CEST)
- Postal codes: 77963
- Dialling codes: 07824
- Vehicle registration: OG, BH, KEL, LR, WOL
- Website: www.schwanau.de

Schwanau (German pronunciation: [ˈʃvaːnaʊ]) is a municipality in the district of Ortenau in Baden-Württemberg in Germany. It was formed in 1971/1972 with the merger of the villages of Allmannsweier, Nonnenweier, Ottenheim and Wittenweier.
