= Gengenbach–Alpirsbach Black Forest Trail =

Trail in Germany

Gengenbach-Alpirsbach Trail
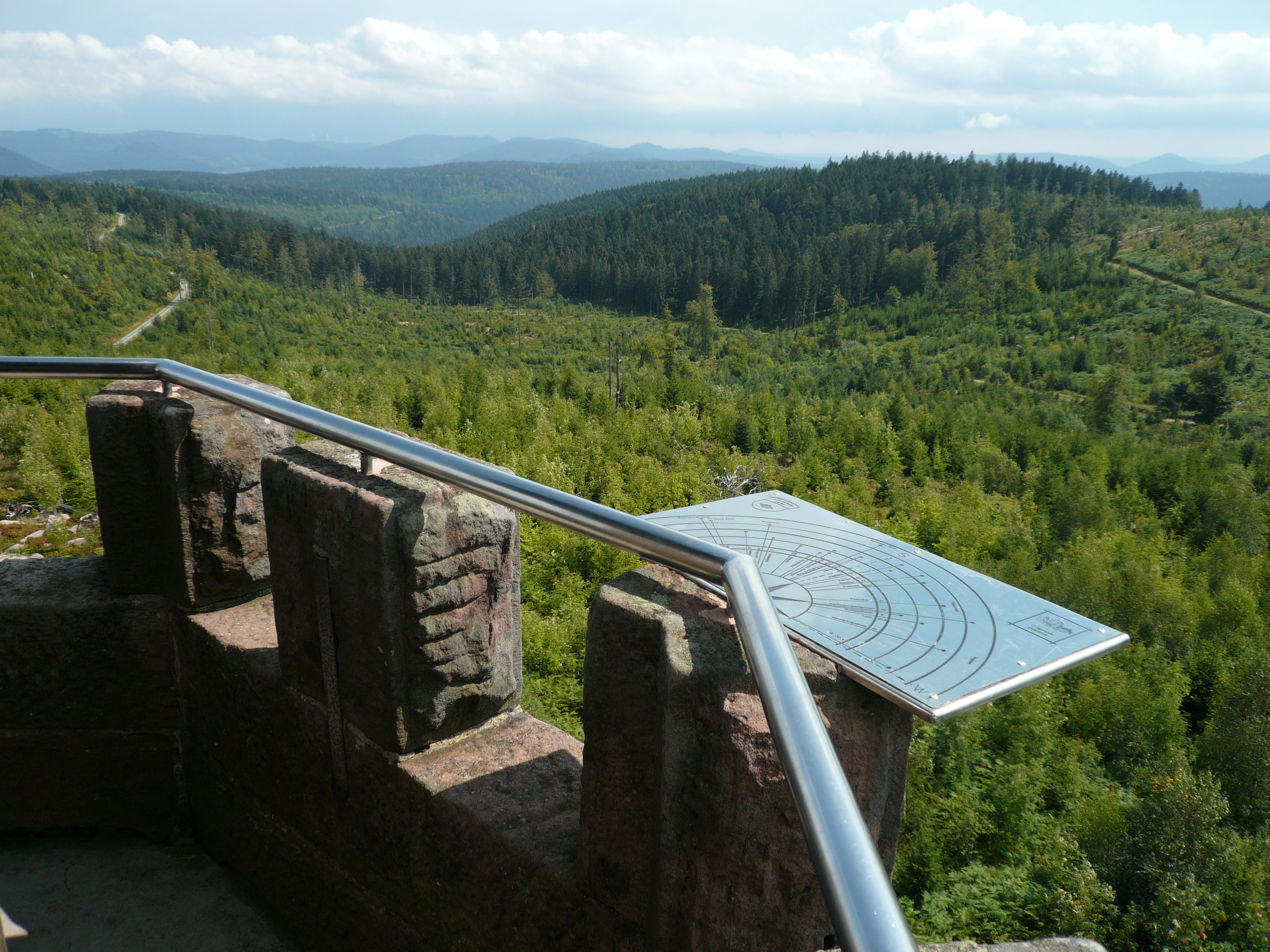
- View from the Moos Tower
- Length: 51 km
- Location: Germany, Baden-Württemberg, Central Black Forest
- Trailheads: Gengenbach; Alpirsbach
- Use: long distance path
- Elevation change: 695 m
- Highest point: Summit of the Moos (871 m)
- Lowest point: Gengenbach (176 m)
- Difficulty: easy/difficult
- Season: spring to autumn
- Months: March–October
- Waymark: blue diamond on a yellow background Waymark
- Sights: Moos Tower
- Maintained by: Black Forest Club

The Gengenbach–Alpirsbach Black Forest Trail (German: Schwarzwald-Querweg Gengenbach–Alpirsbach) is a long distance path through the Central Black Forest in Germany. The 51-kilometre-long east-west route is sponsored and maintained by the Black Forest Club. Its waymark is a blue diamond on a yellow background.

== Route description ==
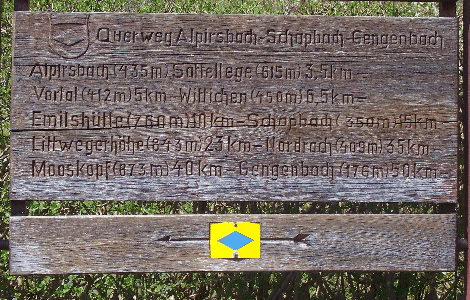
Signboard for the trail in Alpirsbach

The trail begins in Gengenbach in the lower Kinzig valley and runs parallel to the river and across the Northern Black Forest. In three stages it crosses the valleys of the Nordrach, Wolf and Kleine Kinzig. In addition the east-west route crosses the three great long distance paths of the Black Forest Club: the Westweg, Mittelweg and Ostweg. At the end point in Alpirsbach it reaches the Kinzig valley again. The uphill and downhill sections are mainly on hiking trails, level sections (especially on the second stage) follow forest tracks that are usually gravelled.

== Day tours/stages ==
=== First stage: Gengenbach – Nordrach (Moosmatt) ===
==== Overview ====
- Distance: 16 km
- Journey time: c. 4 hours

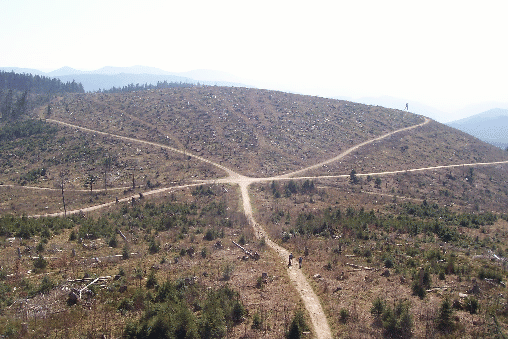
View from the Mooskopf to the Siedigkopf and Lothar Monument

Place/Attraction	Route (km)	Height (m above NHN)	Further information
Gengenbach	0	176	Querweg beginnt am Oberen Tor
Schwandeck	3.5	450	Holzpavillon
Mooskopf	6.5	871	c. 200 metres away from the trail is a crossing with the Kandelhöhenweg
Sonnenhaus	4.5	560	Unmanaged hiking hostel of the Black Forest Club
Nordrach/Moosmatt	1.5	380	Historic charcoal burning site Crossing of the Nordrach

==== Route description ====
The departure point is the upper gateway of Gengenbach. The path merges for about a kilometre with the Ortenau Wine Path running uphill through the village. After the first ascent the trail runs for several kilometres along the ridge (often on footpaths) and then climbs again steeply to the saddle between Mooskopf and Siedigkopf. The viewing tower on the Mooskopf (c. 200 metres from the path) offers a panoramic view; on the Siedigkopf a monument to Hurricane Lothar was built from three silver fir logs (c. 400 metres off the route). Immediately by the path is a monument to Grimmelshausen. The path runs from here mainly on forest tracks initially steeply uphill and, before the final descent, leads into the Nordrach valley to the (unmanaged) hiking hostel of Sonnenhaus. Near Moosmatt it reaches the Nordrach. Here there is a restored charcoal burning pile (Kohlenmeiler), which had been working until 1945.

=== Second stage: Nordrach (Moosmatt) – Schapbach ===
==== Overview ====
- Distance: 20 km
- Journey time: c. 5 hours

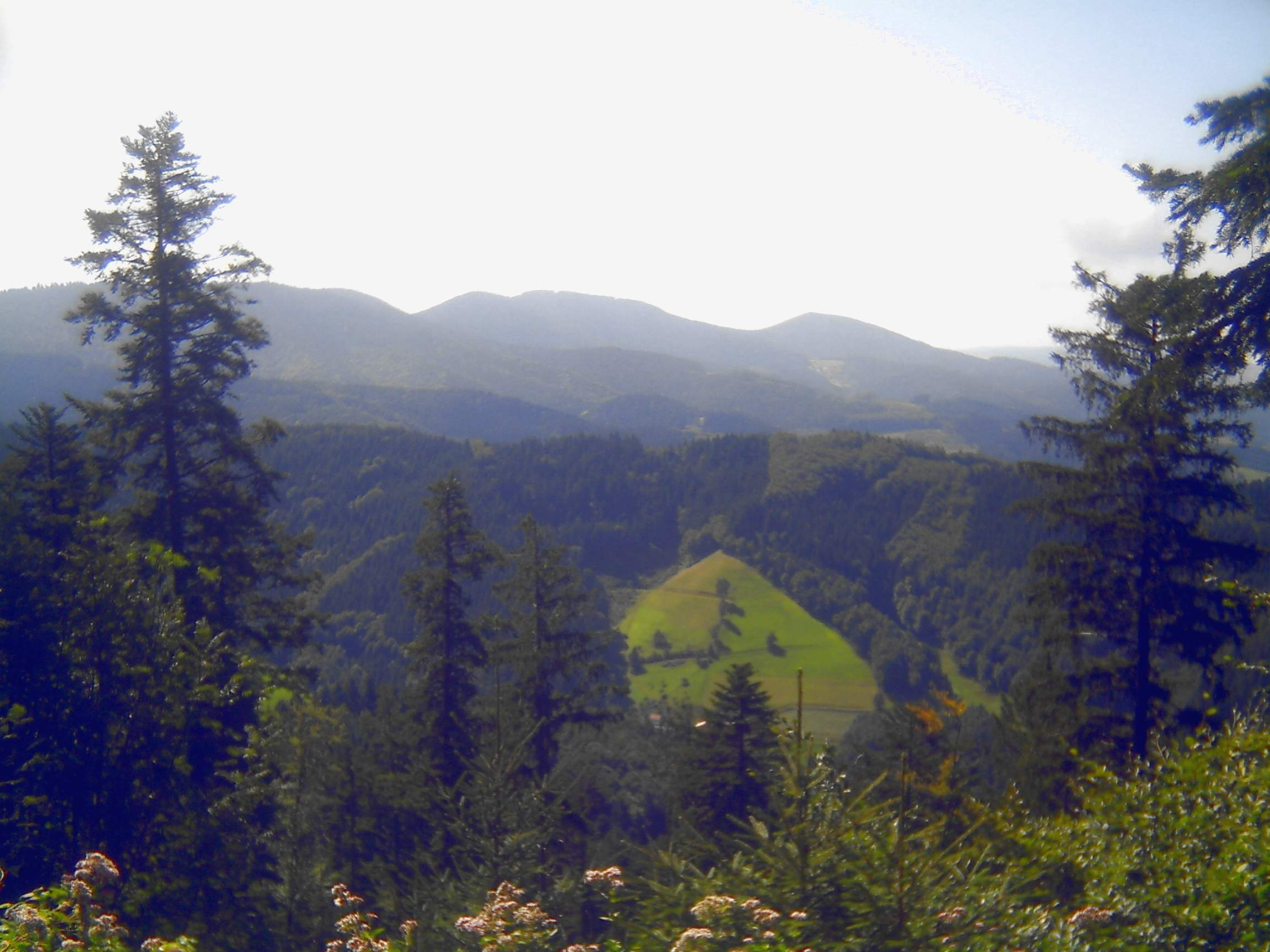
View of the Brandenkopf massif and Harmersbach valley

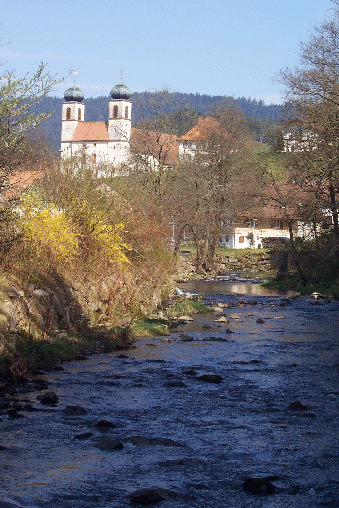
Schapbach

Place/Attraction	Route (km)	Height (m above NHN)	Further information
Nordrach/Moosmatt	0	380	
Rautschhütte	1.5	564	Forsthütte
Rosbedunnen	1.5	712	Saddle between Rautschkopf and Täschenkopf
Heidenkirche	1.0	750	Felsenmeer
Löcherbergwasen	1.5	656	Crosses the Landesstraße 94
Littweger Height	6.5	843	refuge hut Crosses the Westweg
Hansjakobstein	4.5	700	Monument to Heinrich Hansjakob; Crosses the Little Hansjakob Way
Schapbach	3.5	350	church

==== Route description ====
The ascent out of the Nordrach valley climbs steeply to the Rautsch Hut on a footpath. From there the route continues to climb up a forest track and reaches the Heidenkirche blockfield via the Rosbedunnen Saddle. After a short descent the path runs along the slope to the Löcherbergwasen between Harmersbach and the Rench valley. From here the route runs almost on the level along the ridge above the Zuwalder valley and reaches the Westweg on the Littweger Heights. Passing the Hansjakobstein the path runs gently downhill, later more steeply into the valley of the Wolf, which it reaches just before Schapbach.

=== Third stage: Schapbach – Alpirsbach ===
==== Overview ====
- Distance: 15 km
- Journey time: c. 4 hours

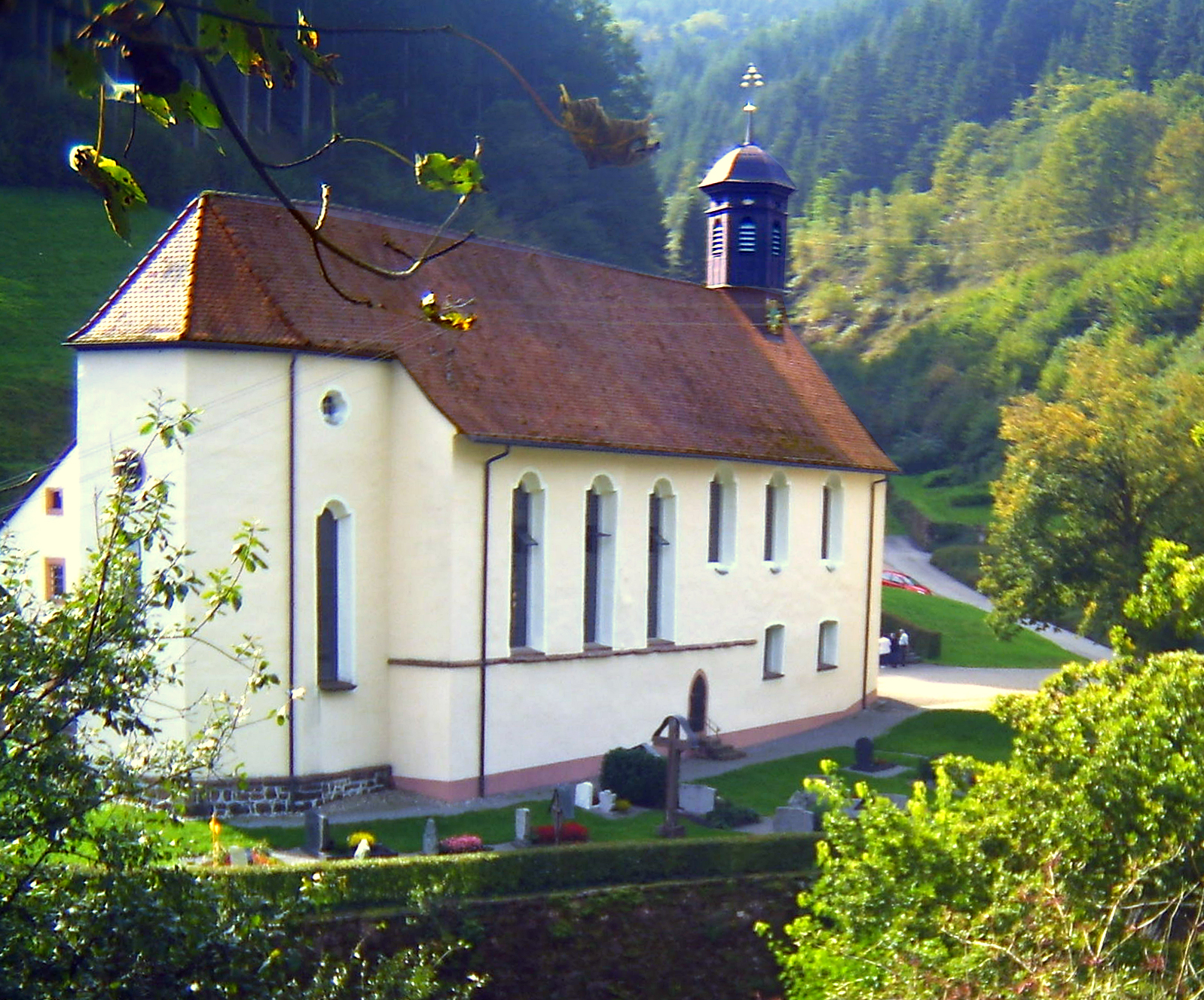
Wittichen Abbey

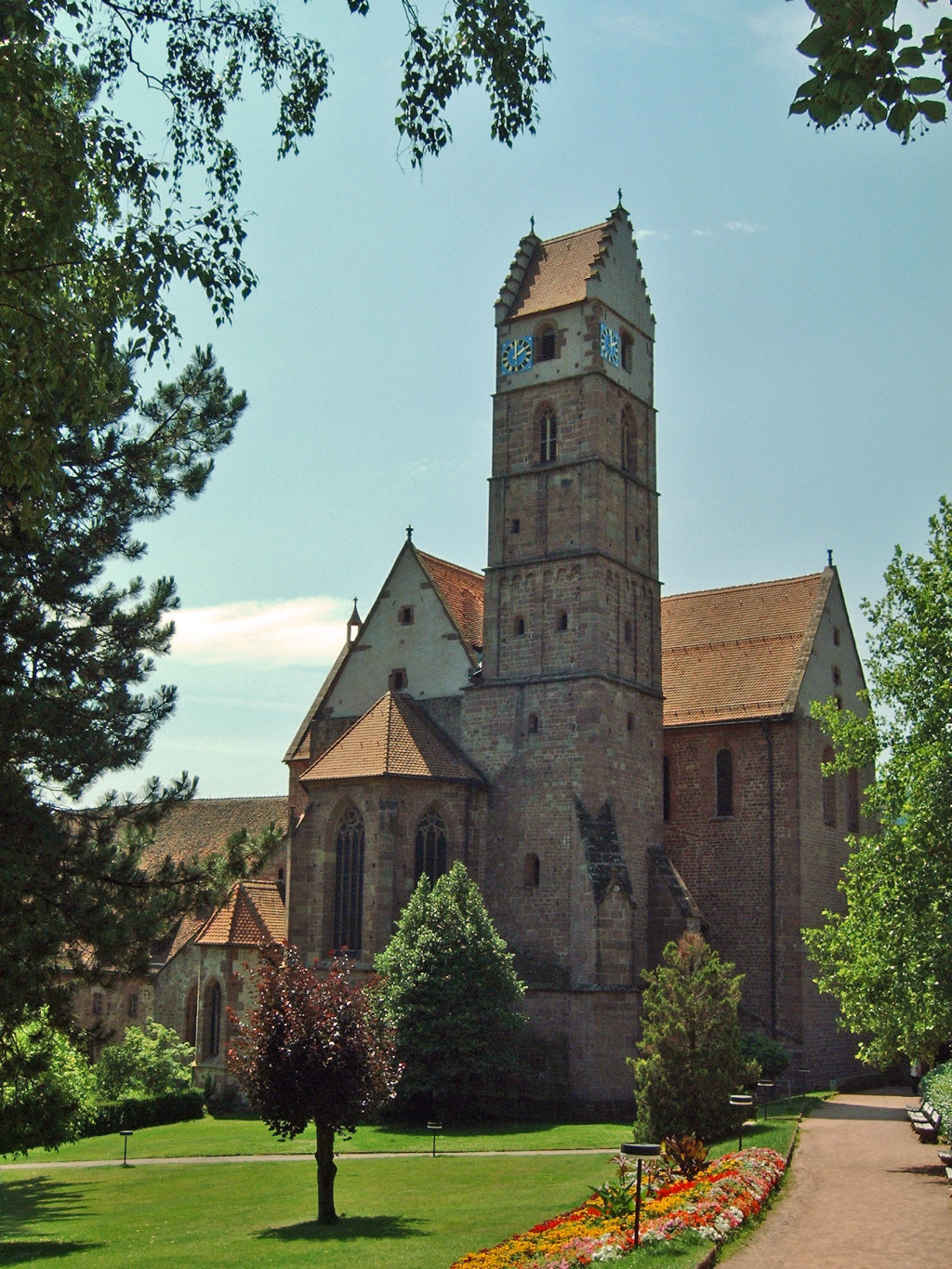
Alpirsbach Abbey

Place/Attraction	Route (km)	Height (m above NHN)	Further information
Schapbach	0	350	
Das Tor	4.5	705	Saddle at the Bocksecken; Crosses the Mittelweg
Emil Hut	1.0	745	refuge hut
Wittichen	2.5	430	Former Wittichen Abbey
Vortal	1.5	412	Crosses the Little Kinzig
Sattellege	1.5	615	c. 500 metre detour to the Staufenkopf Barbecue Hut (683 m) with view of the Kinzig valley
Alpirsbach	3.5	435	Abbey; Crosses the Ostweg

==== Route description ====
The route leaves the Wolf valley on a steep ascent, reaching the saddle called “Das Tor” along a forest track . From her to the Emil Hut (‘’Emilshütte’’) via the Bocksecken it merges with the Mittelweg along a footpath. The descent follows a forest track into the valley of the Little Kinzig and past the former abbey of Wittichen. In Vortal it crosses the Little Kinzig. The ascent from here to the Sattellege is very steep. On the last few kilometres the prath runs above the Kinzig to Alpirsbach.
