= Hansjakob Way I =

Hiking trail in Germany

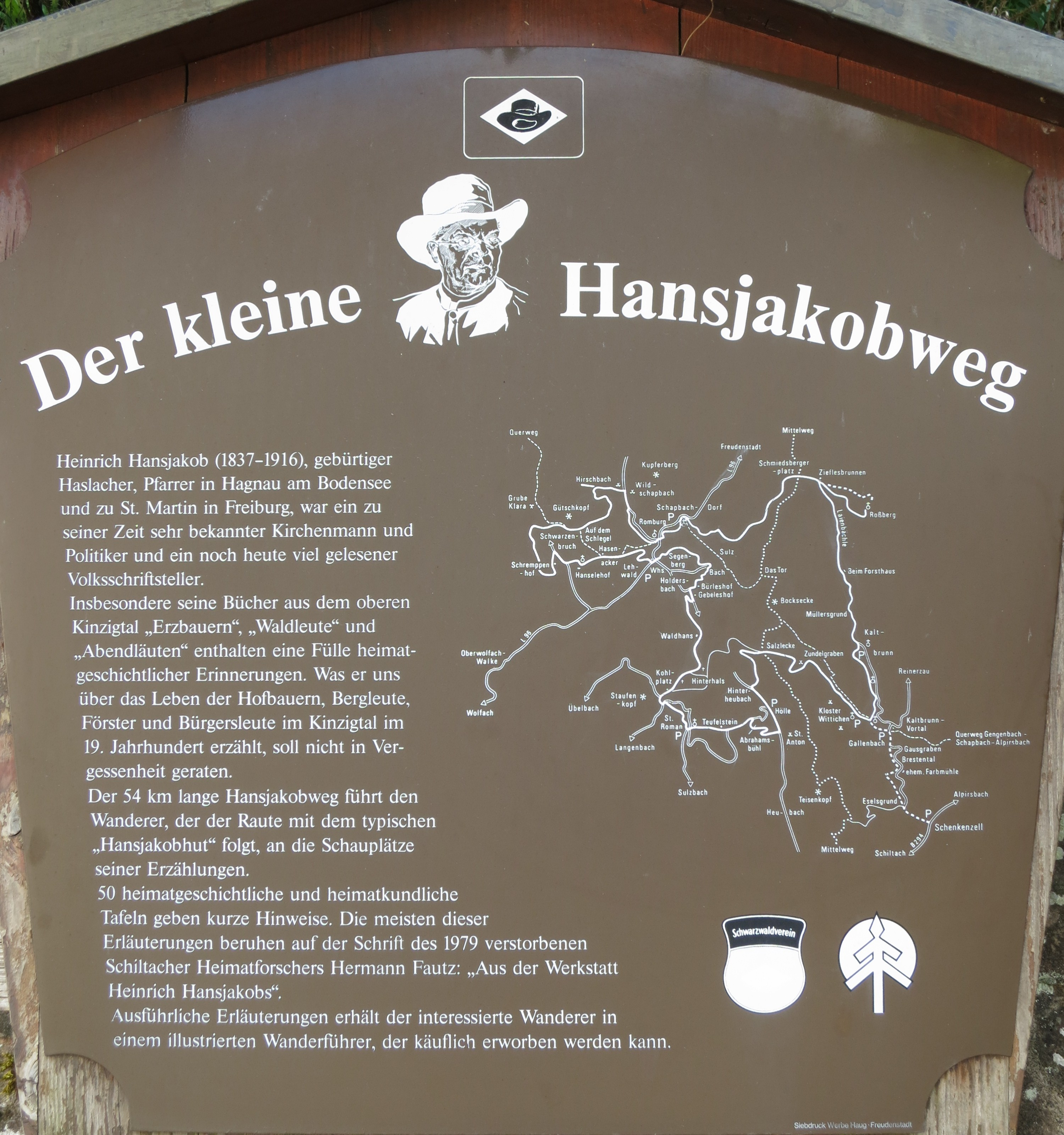
- Signboard in Schapbach
- Length: 44 km
- Location: Germany, Baden-Württemberg, Black Forest
- Trailheads
- Use: Circular walk
- Elevation change: 403 m
- Highest point: Schmiedsberger Platz (778 m)
- Lowest point: Wolftal (375 m)
- Difficulty: Easy
- Season: spring to autumn
- Waymark: Black Hansjakob hat in white diamond Waymark
- Maintained by: Black Forest Club

The Hansjakob Way I (German: Hansjakobweg I), also called the Little Hansjakob Way (Kleiner Hansjakobweg), is a three-day circular walk in the Central Black Forest in Germany. It begins and ends in Schapbach, a village in the municipality of Bad Rippoldsau-Schapbach, between Wolfach and Freudenstadt.

The roughly 44-kilometre-long hiking trail is named after the Baden author and parish priest, Heinrich Hansjakob (1837–1916). The path was opened in 1981 and is sponsored and maintained by the Black Forest Club.

The walk runs to the settings for Hansjakob's stories, Erzbauern (1899), Waldleute (1897) and Abendläuten. The waymark is a white diamond with a black Hansjakob hat, the headwear in which Hansjakob is portrayed in many contemporary pictures and photographs. At all the sights along the way, information boards have been erected, that relate mainly to the life and stores of Hansjakob.

== Day tours/stages ==
=== First Stage: Schapbach – Wittichen Abbey – Schenkenzell ===
Schapbach – Schmiedsberger Platz – Kaltbrunner Tal – Wittichen Abbey (12.5 kilometres) – Vortal – Schenkenzell (16.5 kilometres)

=== Second Stage: Schenkenzell – St. Roman – Wolftal (Gasthaus Ochsen) ===
Schenkenzell – Wittichen Abbey – Salzlecke – Heubach – Teufelstein – St. Roman (Sulzbächletal) – Kohlplatz – Bäch – Schapbach – Wolftal (Gasthaus Ochsen) (22.5 kilometres – from Wittichen Abbey only 18.5 kilometres)

=== Third Stage: Wolftal – Wildschapbach – Schapbach ===
Wolftal (Gasthaus Ochsen) – Schwarzenbruch (Oberwolfach) – Hirschbach – Wildschapbach – Schapbach (13 kilometres)

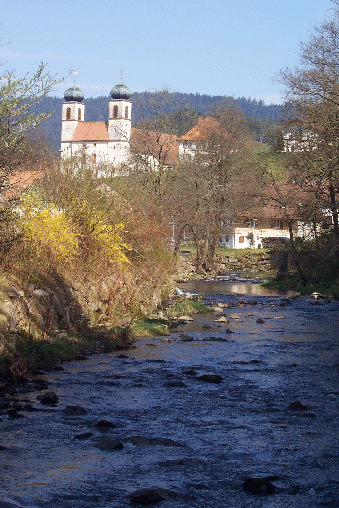
View of the onion towers of Schapbach

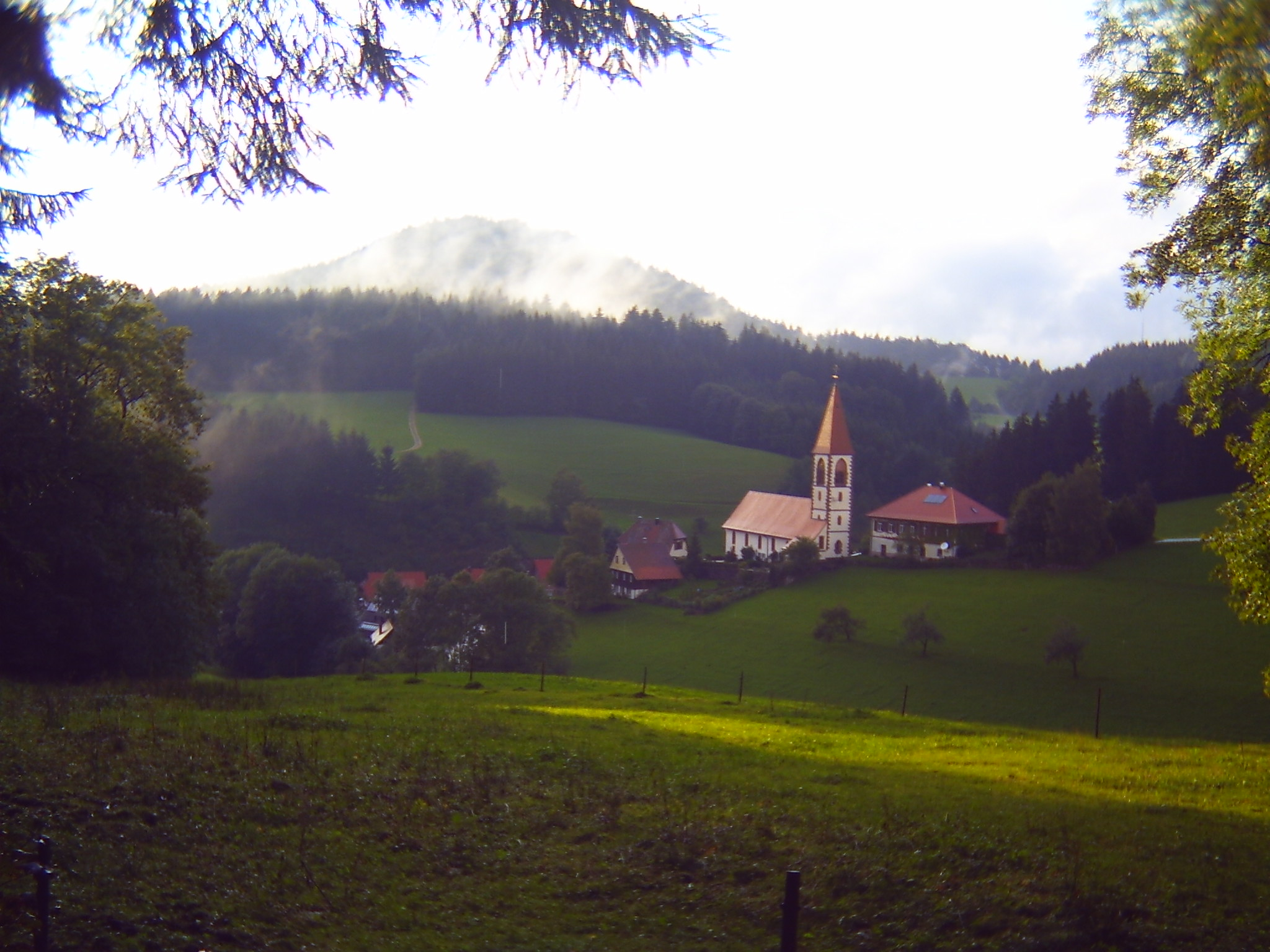
Bergdorf Wolfach-St. Roman

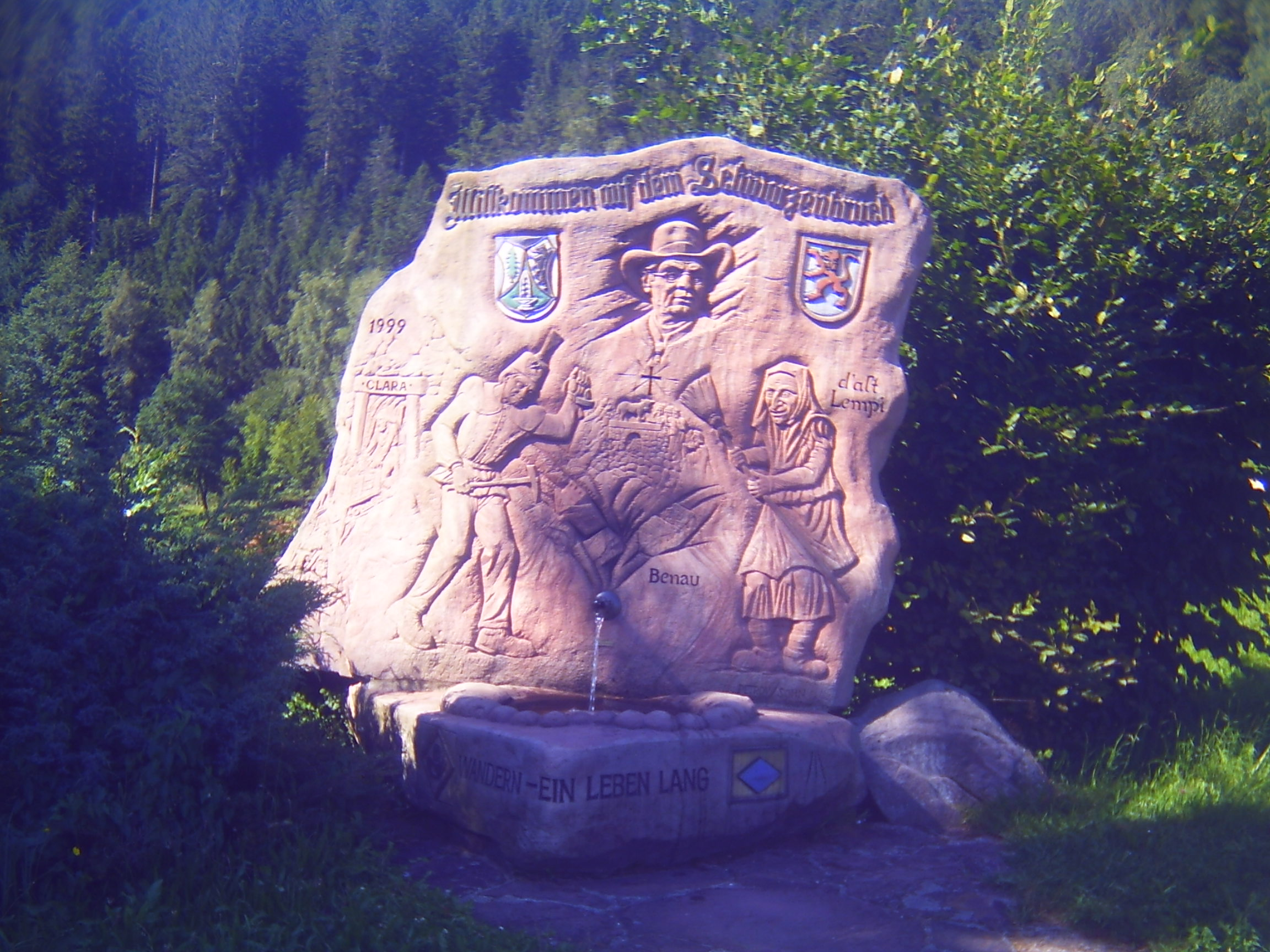
Hansjakob Rock on the Little Hansjakob Way on the Schwarzenbruch

== Literature ==
- Martin Kuhnle: Schwarzwald Mitte/Nord. Bergverlag Rother, Munich, 2013, ISBN 978-3-7633-4420-8, pp. 154–165.
