= Oberwolfach =

- Municipality
- Coat of arms

- Location of Oberwolfach within Ortenaukreis district
- Interactive map of Oberwolfach
- Location within Germany Location within Baden-Württemberg
- Coordinates: 48°19′N 8°13′E
- Country: Germany
- State: Baden-Württemberg
- Admin. region: Freiburg
- District: Ortenaukreis

Government
  - Mayor (2023–31): Matthias Bauernfeind (CDU)

Area
  - Total: 51.27 km^{2} (19.80 sq mi)
- Elevation: 323 m (1,060 ft)

Population (2025-12-31)
  - Total: 2,499
  - Density: 48.74/km^{2} (126.2/sq mi)
- Time zone: UTC+01:00 (CET)
  - Summer (DST): UTC+02:00 (CEST)
- Postal codes: 77709
- Dialling codes: 07834
- Vehicle registration: OG, BH, KEL, LR, WOL
- Website: oberwolfach.de

Oberwolfach (Low Alemannic: Obberwolfä) is a town in the district of Ortenau in Baden-Württemberg, Germany. It is the site of the Oberwolfach Research Institute for Mathematics, or Mathematisches Forschungsinstitut Oberwolfach.

== Geography ==
=== Geographical situation ===
The town of Oberwolfach lies between 270 and 948 meters above sea level in the central Schwarzwald (Black Forest) on the river Wolf, a tributary of the Kinzig.

=== Neighbouring localities ===
The district is neighboured by Bad Peterstal-Griesbach to the north, Bad Rippoldsau-Schapbach in Landkreis Freudenstadt to the east, by the towns of Wolfach and Hausach to the south, and by Oberharmersbach to the west.

== Demographics ==
Population development:

Year	Inhabitants
1990	2,655
2001	2,775
2011	2,678
2021	2,574
