= Mother Kinzig =

- Mutter Kinzig
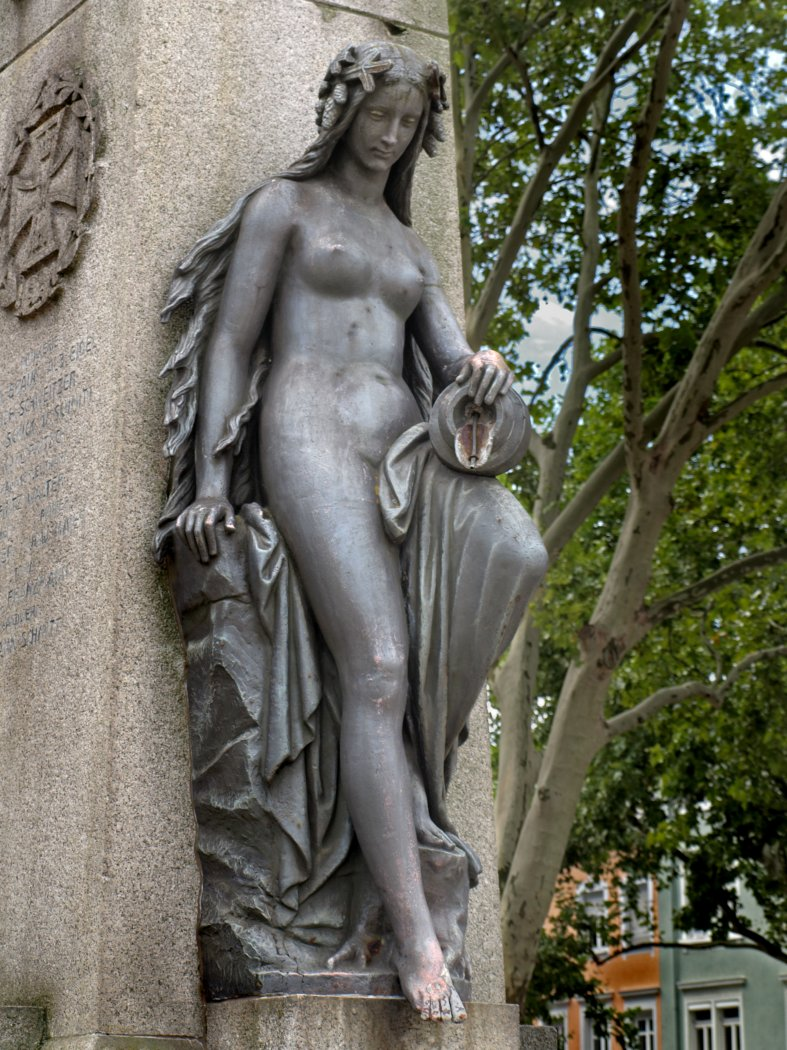
- Mother Kinzig
- Interactive map of Mother Kinzig
- Location: Kehl, Germany
- Coordinates: 48°34′23.55″N 7°48′40.41″E
- Designer: Franz Xaver Reich
- Type: statue
- Material: cast iron
- Height: 6 ft (1.83 m) (est.)
- Completion date: 1861
- Restored date: 1905
- Dedicated to: River Kinzig

Mother Kinzig (German: Mutter Kinzig) is an 1861 cast iron statue in the German city of Kehl. It represents a "beautiful, dreamy, and sexy", "marvelously pretty" nude woman, who has been called "the most beautiful girl of Kehl".

== Description ==
Mother Kinzig is a personification of the river Kinzig, a tributary of the Rhine. An idealized, broad-shouldered woman with long, flowing hair and a crown of cones, she is depicted as stepping down from a tree stump while pouring water from a hydria. The statue is approximately life-sized.

== History ==
The statue was originally placed opposite a representation of "Father Rhine" on the 17 metres (56 ft) high Gothic Revival portal on the German side of the railway bridge across the Rhine between Kehl and Strasbourg, France, inaugurated in April 1861. On the French side, an equivalent pair of statues depicted Père Rhin and Mère Ill. Mother Kinzig is the work of the Neoclassical sculptor Franz Xaver Reich (1815–1881); her counterpart Father Rhine was the work of Hans Baur.

With the destruction of the bridge on 22 July 1870, during the Franco-Prussian War, the statues fell into the Rhine. They were replaced by new versions on the new bridge, which was built in 1874 and completely destroyed during World War II. While the original Father Rhine was never recovered, the original Mother Kinzig was retrieved in 1897.

The pairing of a male statue representing the river Rhine with a female statue representing one of its tributaries was something of a local tradition in the 19th century. The two pairs on the railway bridge are lost, but a third pair, personifications of Rhenus and Mosella, can still be seen today in Strasbourg's Neustadt (see gallery below).

== Current presentation ==
Since 1905, the statue of Mother Kinzig adorns the memorial commemorating the Franco-Prussian war on Kehls's central square, Marktplatz (Market Square). Behind her is a free space where the former city hall of Kehl used to stand (the current city hall, a 1817 building, is in use as such since 1910).

== Gallery ==
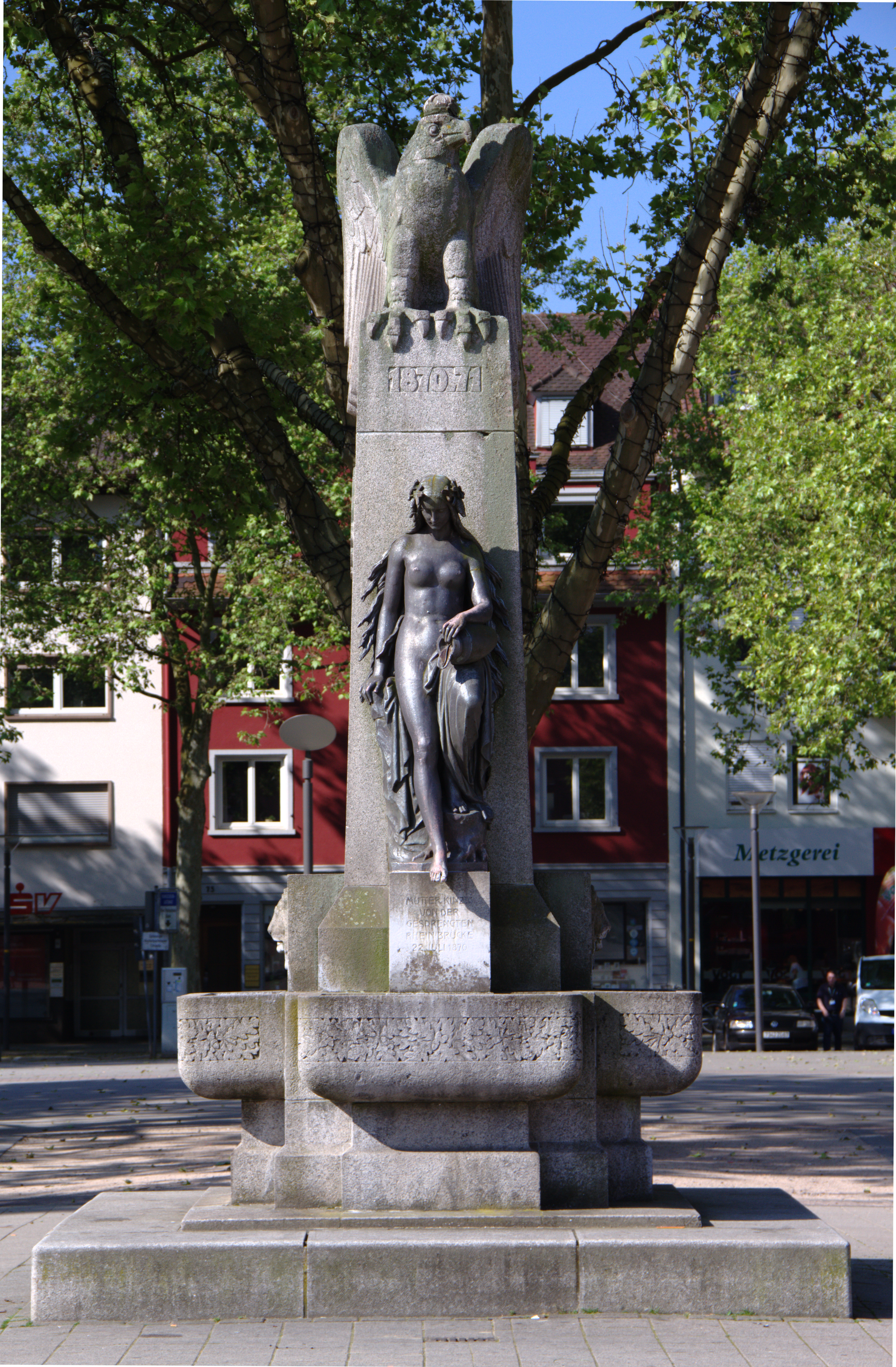
Mother Kinzig in situ

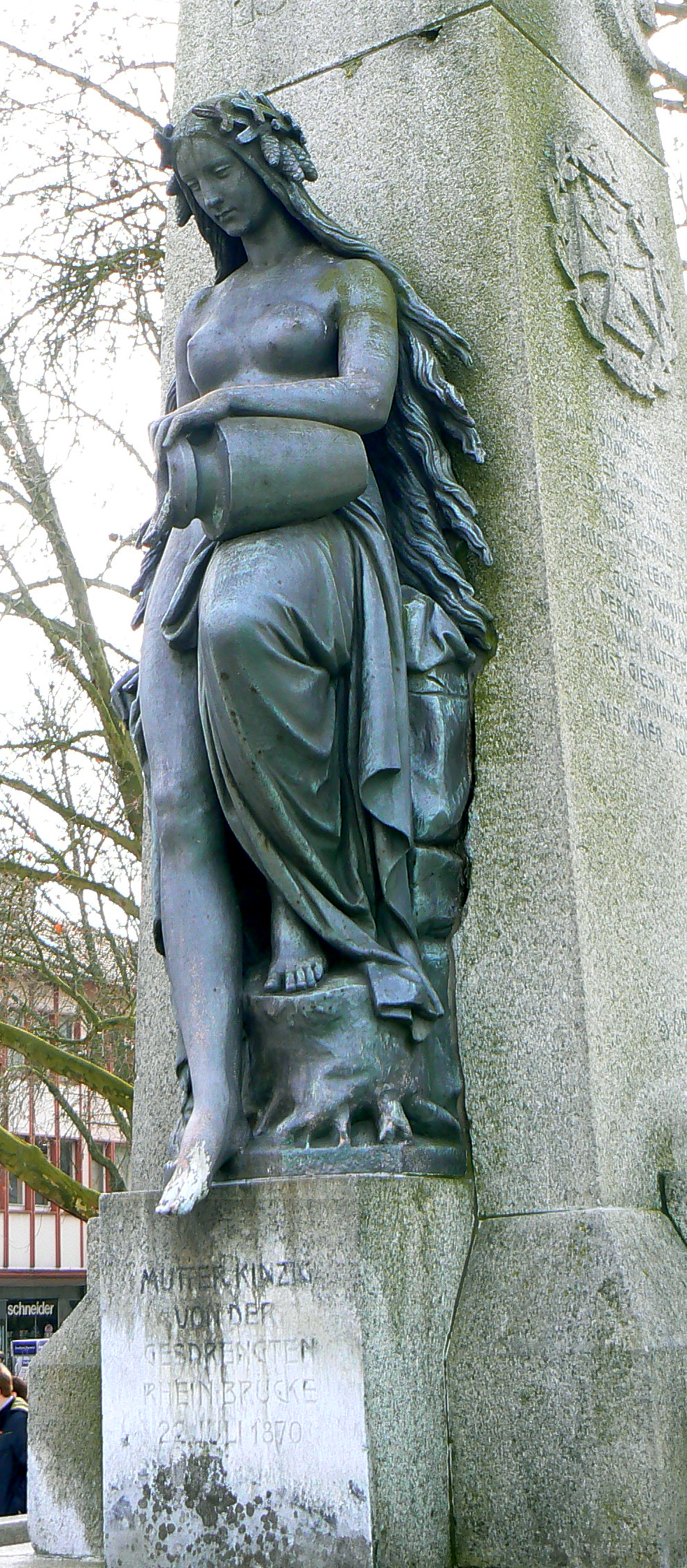
The hydria and the tree stump

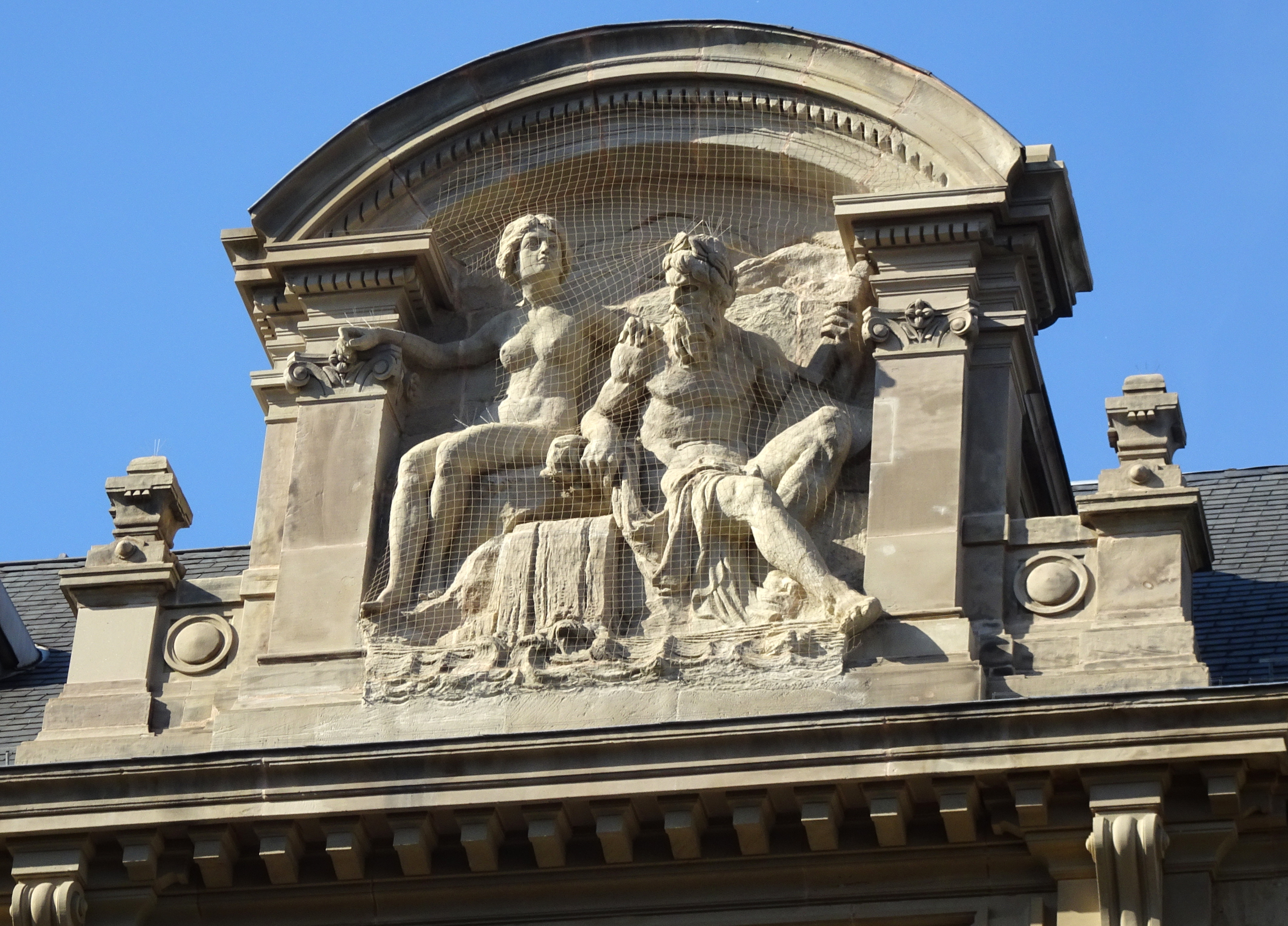
For comparison: Father Rhine and Mother Mosella, by Alfred Marzolff (1898)
