= Rötenbach (Kinzig) =

River in Germany

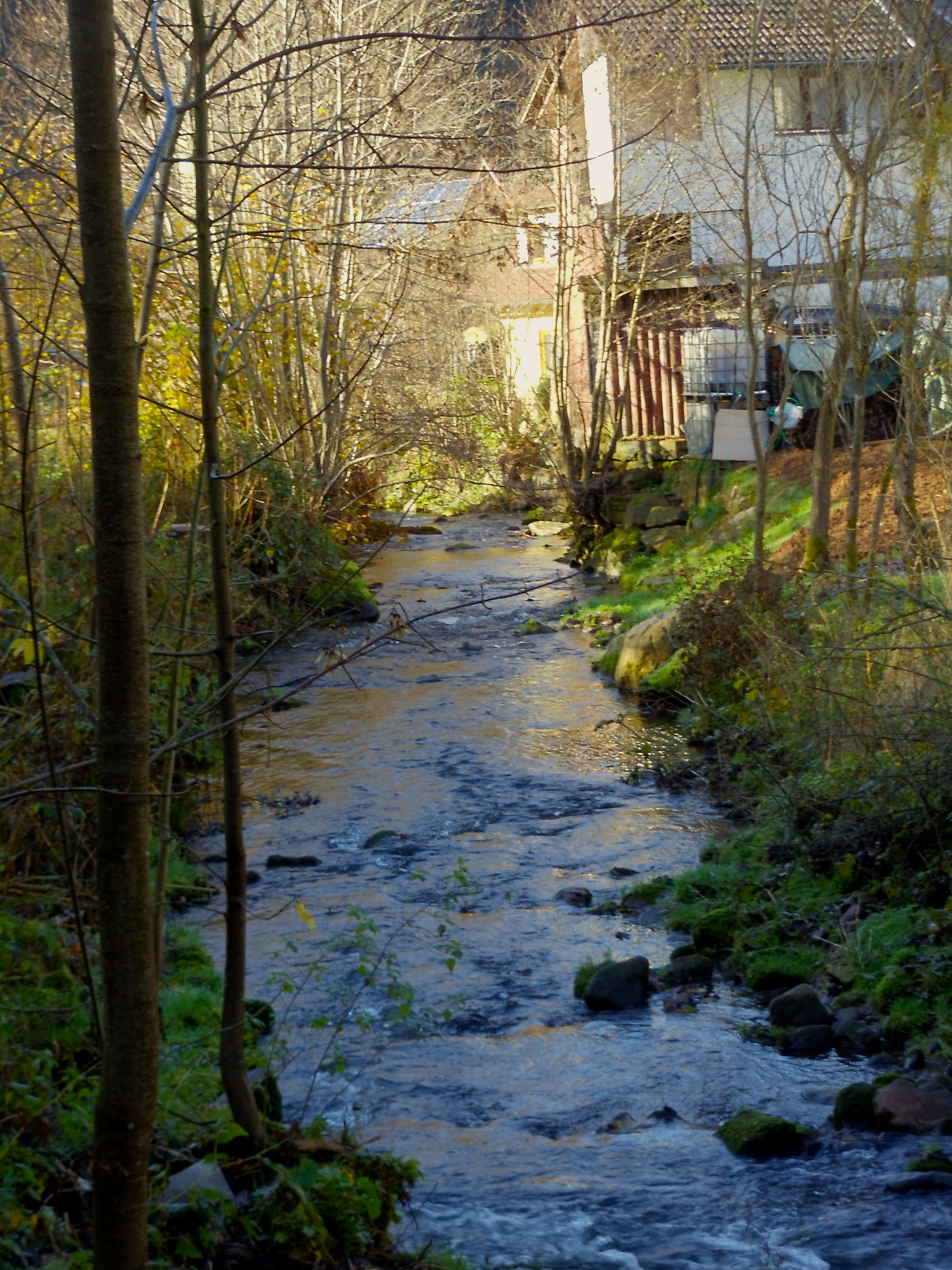

Location
- Country: Germany
- States: Baden-Württemberg

Physical characteristics
- Mouth
  - location: Kinzig
  - coordinates: 48.3292°N 8.3961°E

Basin features
- Progression: Kinzig→ Rhine→ North Sea

Rötenbach is a river in Baden-Württemberg, Germany. It flows into the Kinzig near Alpirsbach. Flow through village from the south to north, and ends in Wutac.

It available with the black forest and trails through the woods.

== See also ==
- List of rivers of Baden-Württemberg
