= Harmersbach =

River in Baden-Württemberg, Germany

Location
- Country: Germany
- State: Baden-Württemberg

Physical characteristics
- Mouth
  - location: Kinzig
  - coordinates: 48.3321°N 8.0290°E
- Length: 18.9 km (11.7 mi)

Basin features
- Progression: Kinzig→ Rhine→ North Sea

Harmersbach (German pronunciation: [ˈhaʁmɐsbax]; below its confluence with the Nordrach: Erlenbach) is a river of Baden-Württemberg, Germany. It passes through Zell am Harmersbach, and flows into the Kinzig in Biberach. Until 1806, the Harmersbach valley held the unique distinction of being the only Reichstal of the Holy Roman Empire, a free peasant republic immediate to the Emperor.

== See also ==
- List of rivers of Baden-Württemberg
