= Kleine Kinzig =

River in Germany

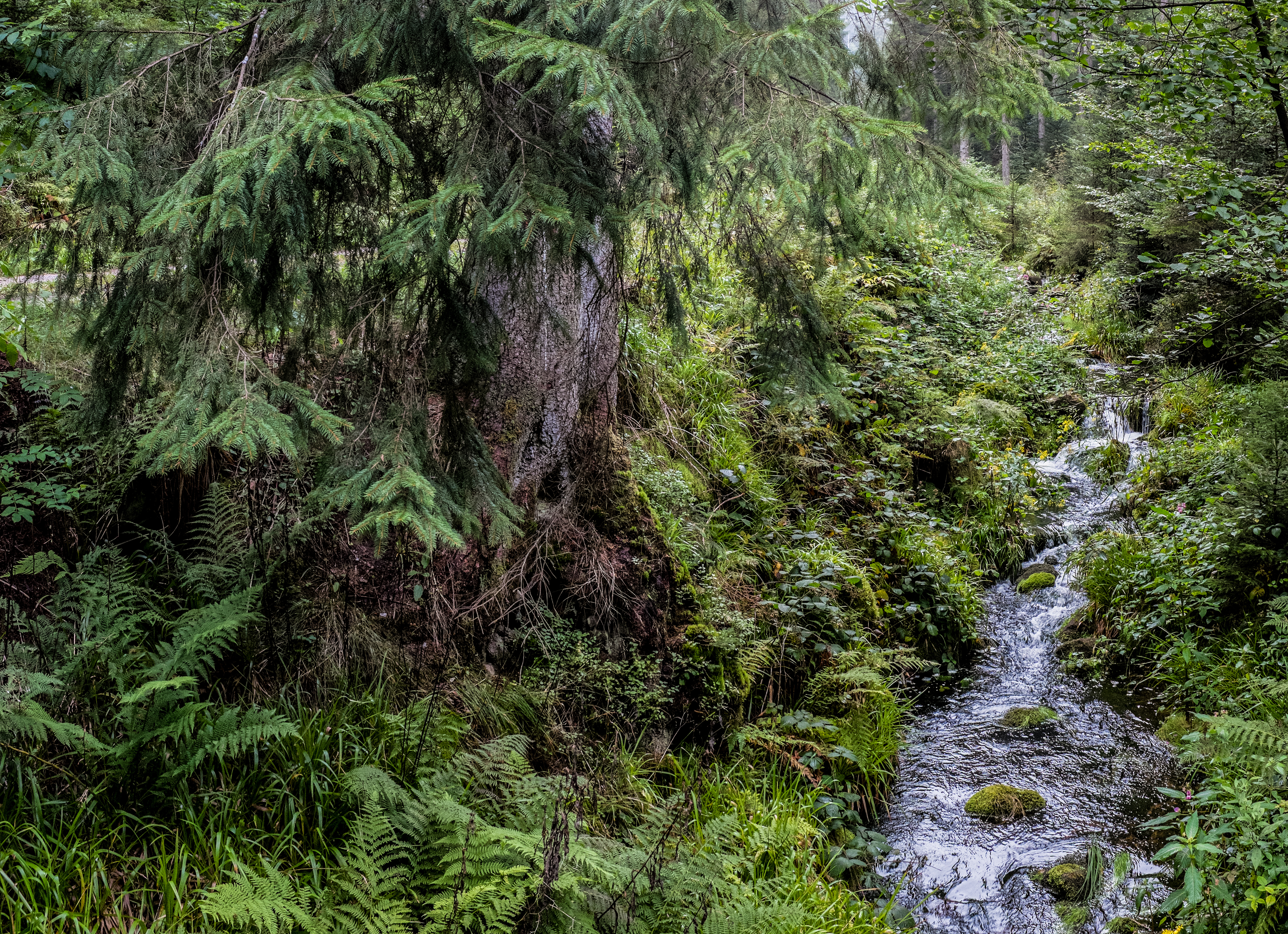

Location
- Country: Germany
- State: Baden-Württemberg

Physical characteristics
- Mouth
  - location: Kinzig
  - coordinates: 48.3091°N 8.3731°E
- Length: 20.5 km (12.7 mi)

Basin features
- Progression: Kinzig→ Rhine→ North Sea

Kleine Kinzig is a river of Baden-Württemberg, Germany. It flows into the Kinzig in Schenkenzell.

== See also ==
- List of rivers of Baden-Württemberg
