= Aischbach (Kinzig) =

River in Germany

- Location of mouth

Location
- Country: Germany
- State: Baden-Württemberg

Physical characteristics
- Mouth
  - location: Kinzig
  - coordinates: 48.3472°N 8.4133°E

Basin features
- Progression: Kinzig→ Rhine→ North Sea

The Aischbach is a river in Baden-Württemberg, Germany. It is a left tributary of the Kinzig in Alpirsbach.

== See also ==
- List of rivers of Baden-Württemberg
