= Burgbach Waterfall =

Coordinates: 48.409749°N 8.335485°E

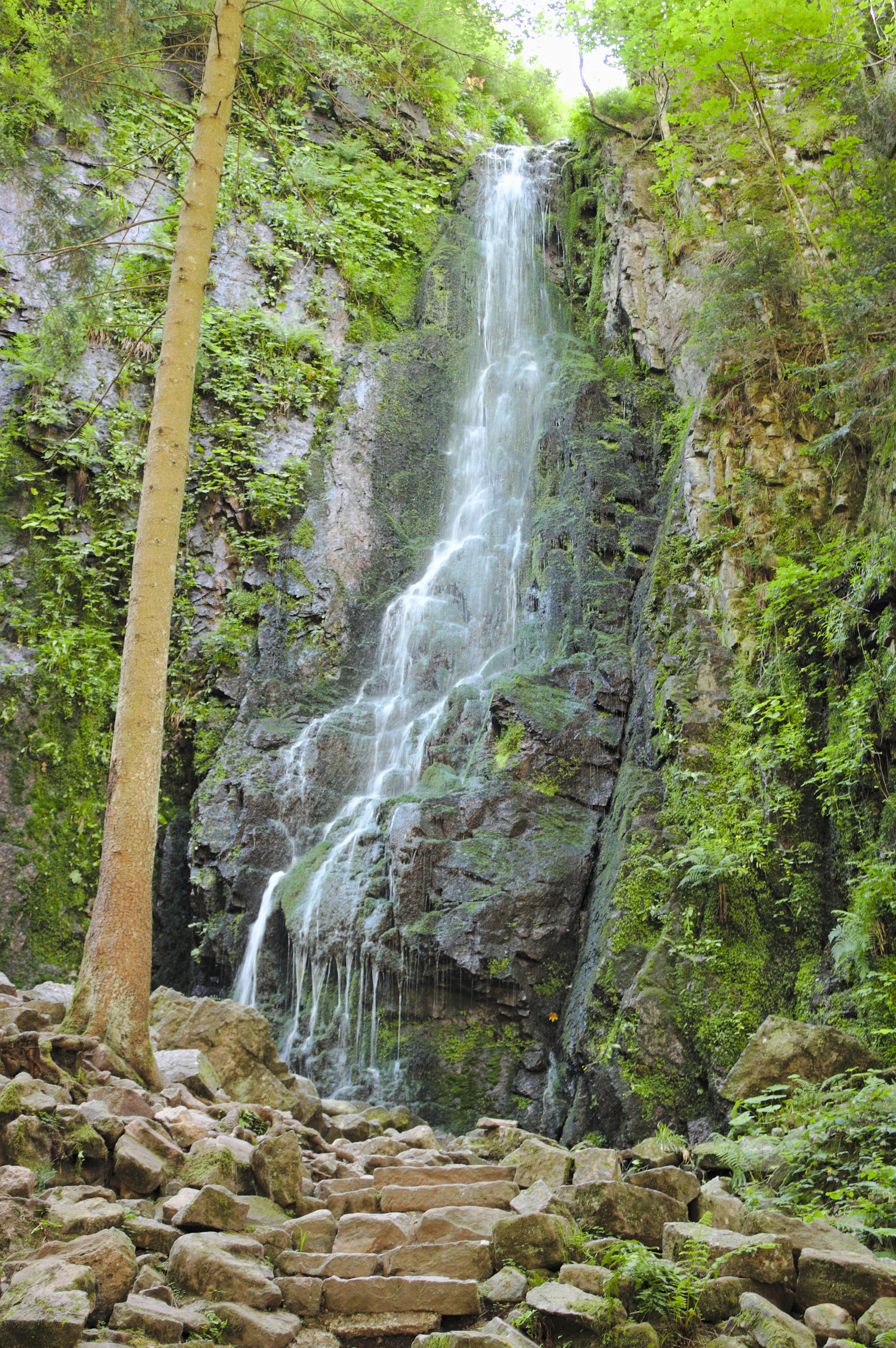
The Burgbach Waterfall

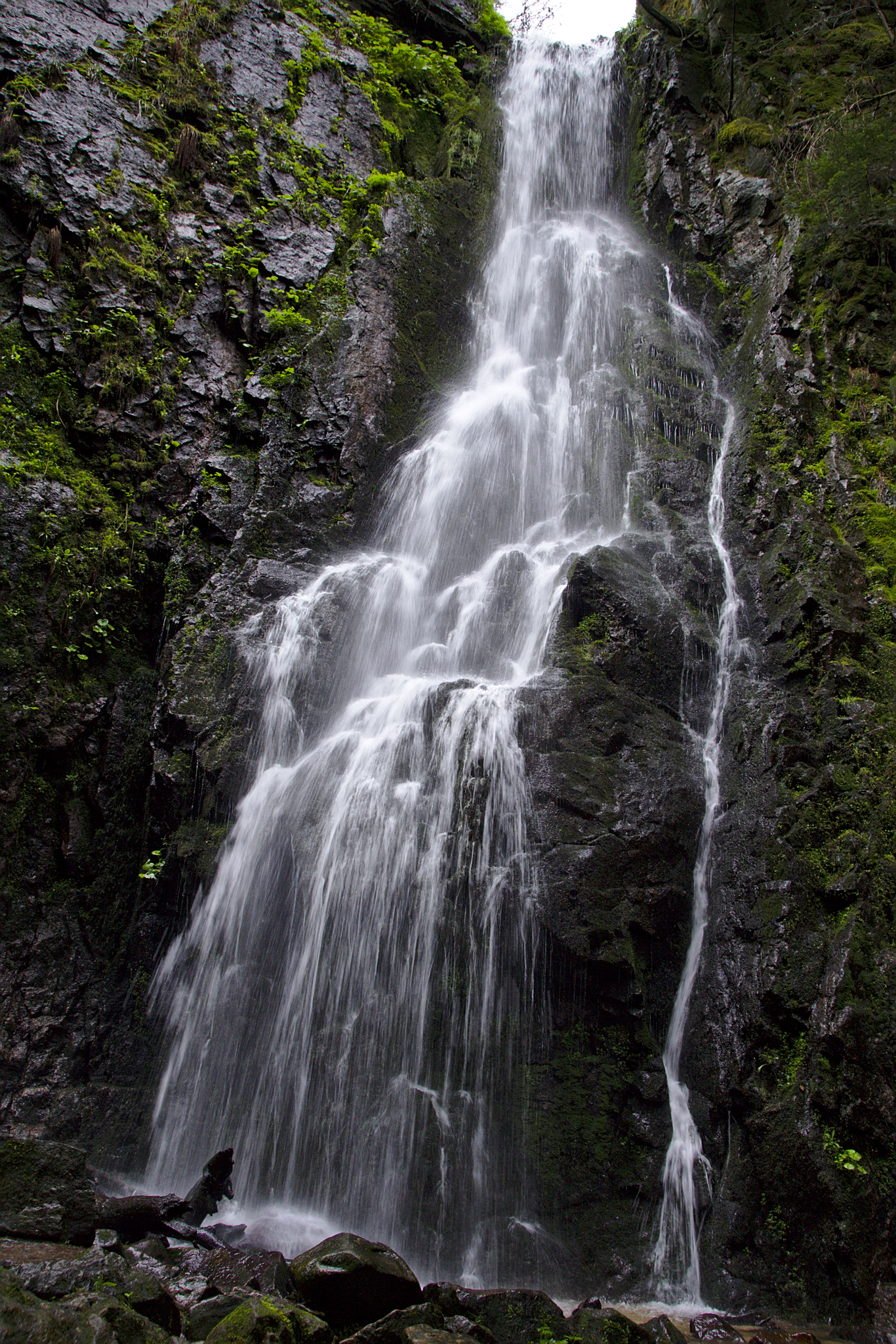
The Burgbach Waterfall after rain

The Burgbach Waterfall (German: Burgbachwasserfall) in the vicinity of Bad Rippoldsau-Schapbach in the Black Forest has a drop of 15 metres and a total height of 32 metres making it one of the highest free falling waterfalls in Germany. Its rock shelf is made of hard, silicified sandstones of the Upper Rotliegendes (Permian), which lie over less weather-resistant granites that are easy to carve out. The waterfall is classified as a geological natural monument. The Burgbach flows steeply downhill to the River Wolf.
