= Heubach (Kinzig) =

River in Baden-Württemberg, Germany

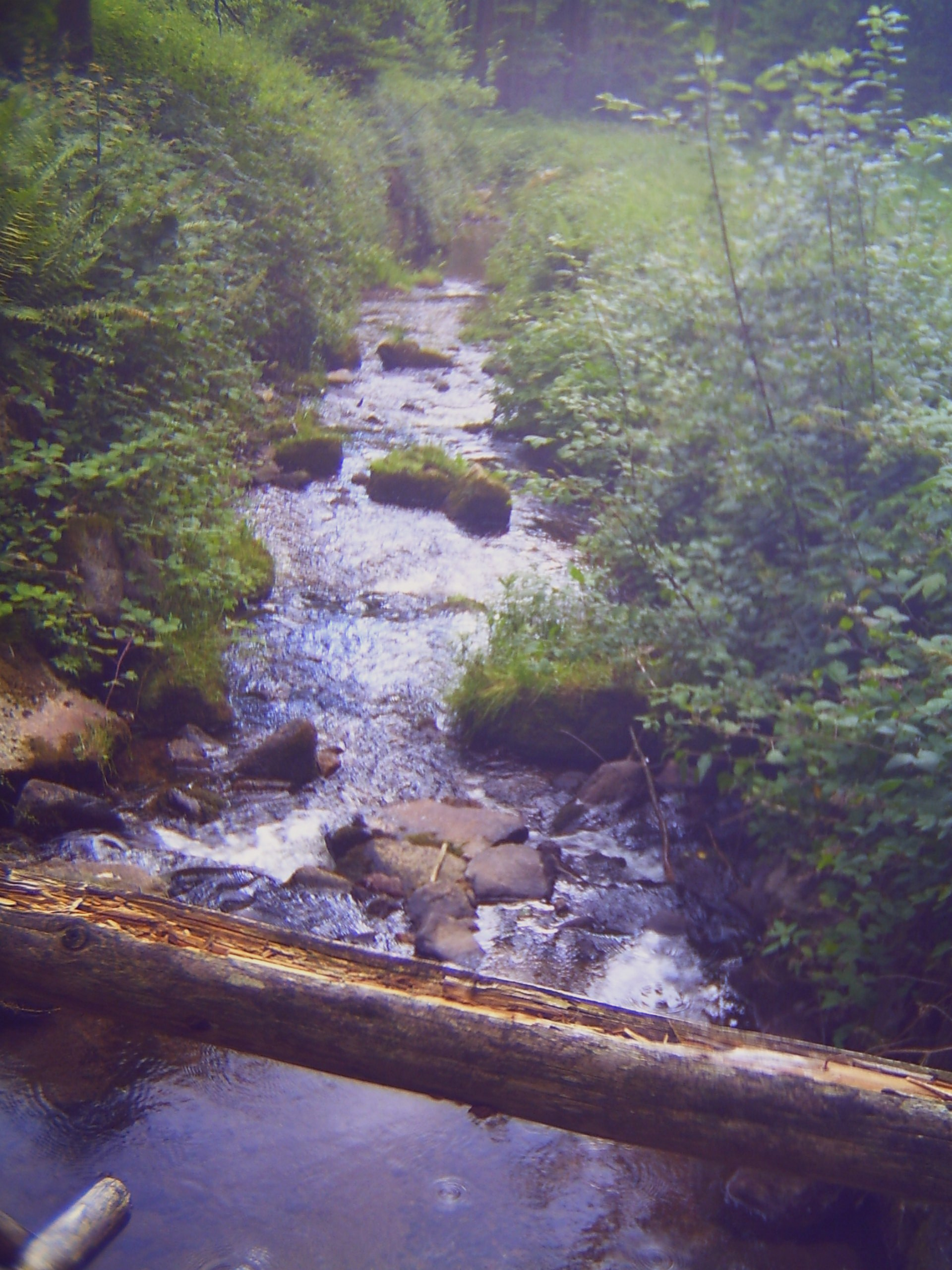

Location
- Country: Germany
- States: Baden-Württemberg

Physical characteristics
- Mouth
  - location: Kinzig
  - coordinates: 48.2907°N 8.3305°E

Basin features
- Progression: Kinzig→ Rhine→ North Sea

Heubach is a river of Baden-Württemberg, Germany. It flows into the Kinzig near Schiltach.

== See also ==
- List of rivers of Baden-Württemberg
