= Rhenus Pater =

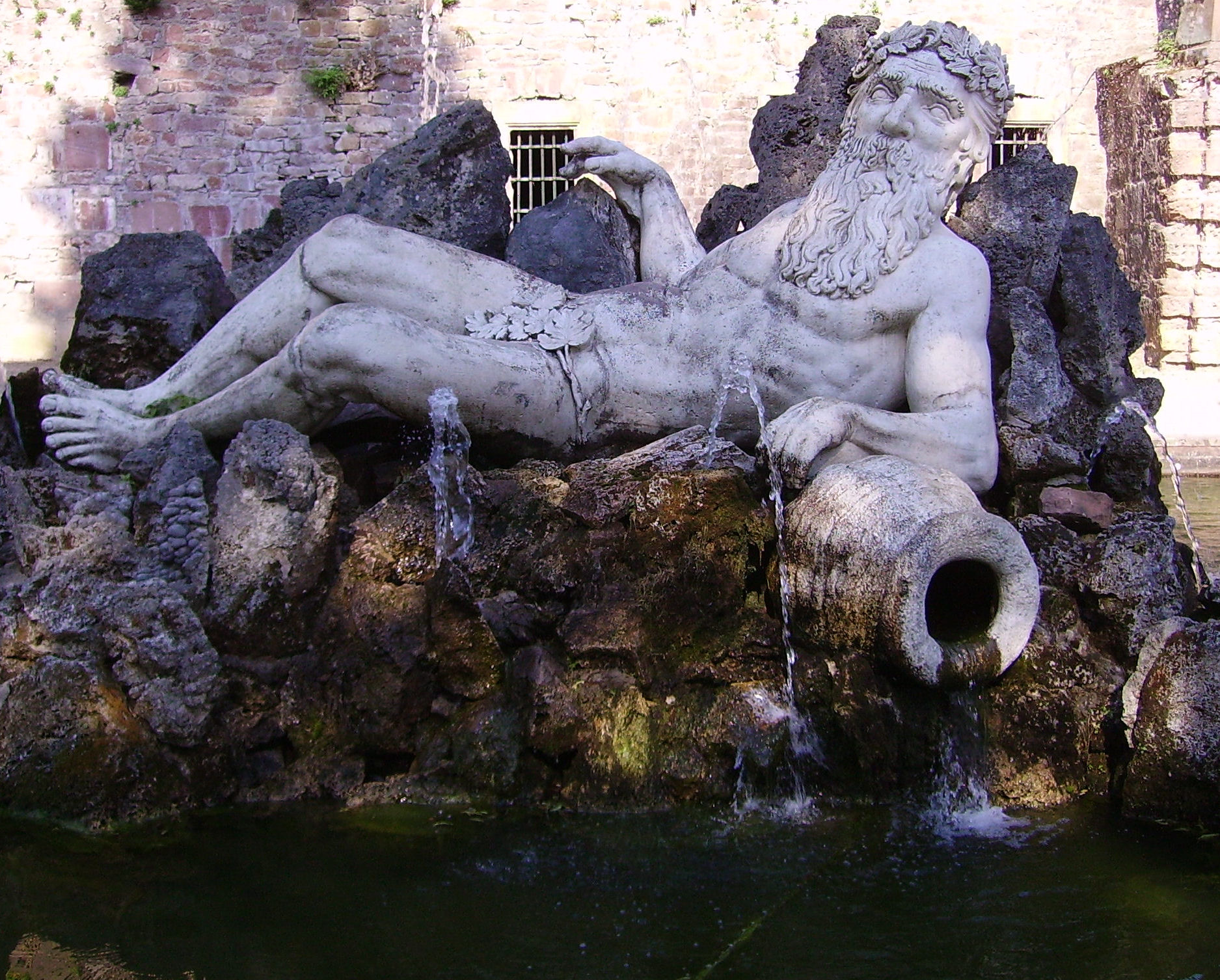
Vater Rhein at Hortus Palatinus, c. 1620

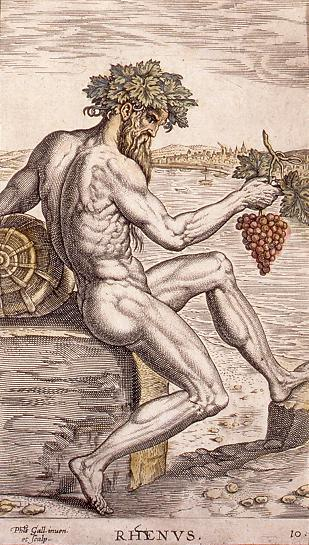
Rhenus (c. 1750)

Rhenus Pater ("Father Rhine", German Vater Rhein) is the personification or river god of the Rhine, attested in epigraphy and associated with Neptunus, called "father of nymphs and rivers" by Martial (10.7). Because of his depiction with horns also called Rhenus bicornis, and as an allegory of the subjugated barbarian tribes called Rhenus cornibus fractis "Rhenus with broken horns" by Ovid. There are records of Celtic and Germanic human sacrifice to river gods, and of the Rhine specifically records of a custom of submerging newly-born infants as a test of either their vitality, or as an oracle to determine if they had been conceived in wedlock.

The allegory was taken up again as a motive in the German Baroque period, and again in 19th-century German Romanticism (Rheinromantik).
