= Sulzbächle =

River in Germany

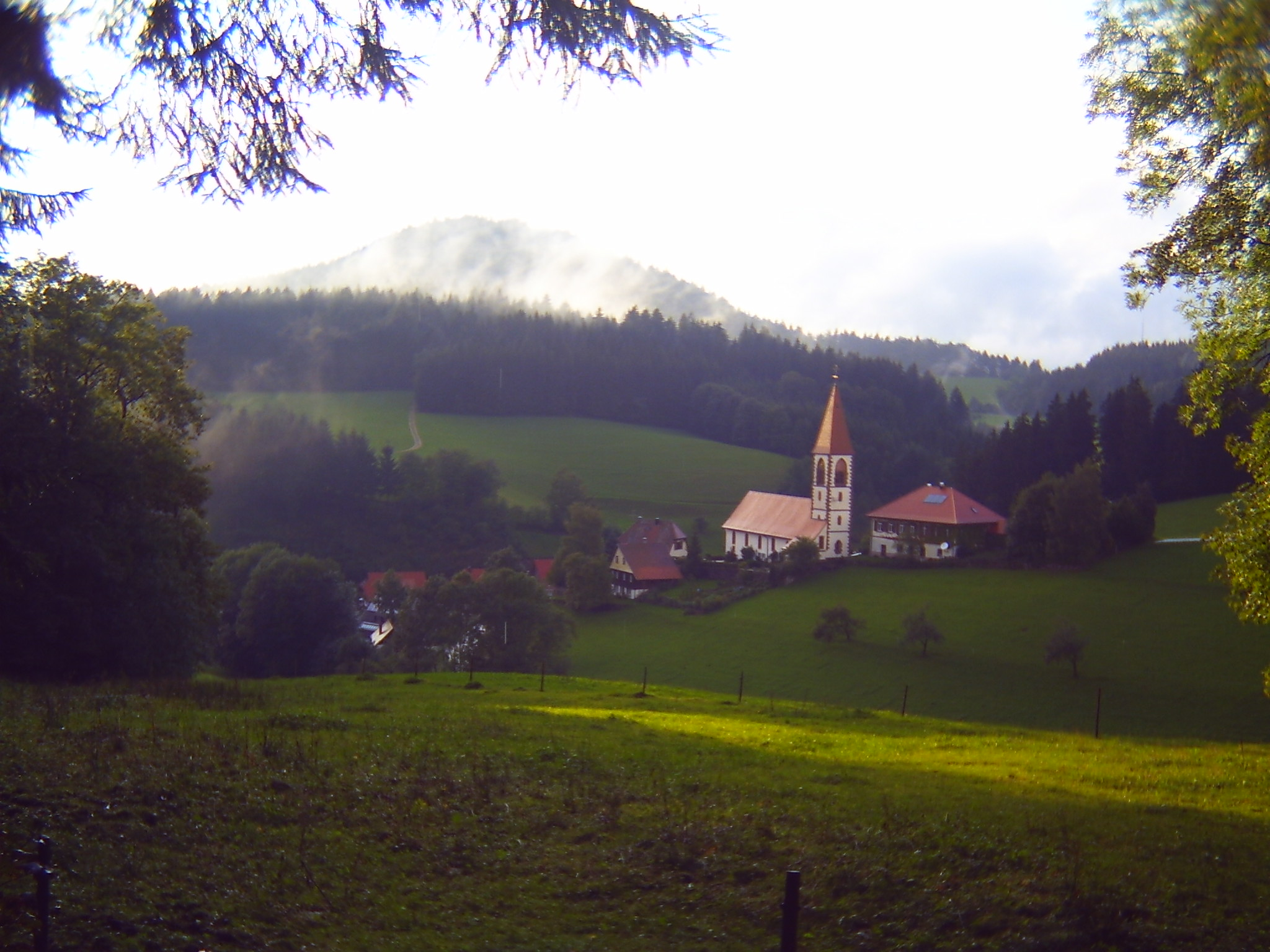

Location
- Country: Germany
- State: Baden-Württemberg

Physical characteristics
- Mouth
  - location: Kinzig
  - coordinates: 48.2913°N 8.2957°E

Basin features
- Progression: Kinzig→ Rhine→ North Sea

Sulzbächle is a small river of Baden-Württemberg, Germany. It flows into the Kinzig west of Schiltach.

== Minerals in the area ==
Some of the minerals in the area are: aragonite, baryte, brochantite, calcite, chalcopyrite, chrysocolla, cuprite, devilline, fluorite, hematite, langite and malachite.

== See also ==
- List of rivers of Baden-Württemberg
