= Wolf (river) =

River of Baden-Württemberg, Germany

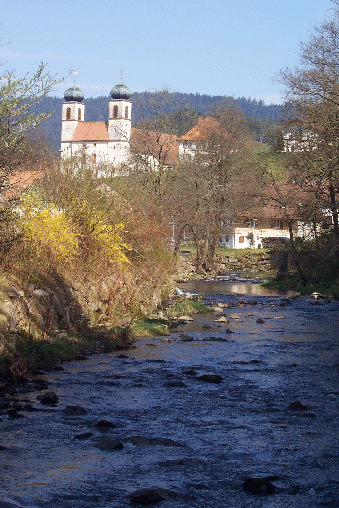
- The Wolf below Schapbach

Location
- Country: Germany
- State: Baden-Württemberg
- Reference no.: DE: 23432

Physical characteristics
- Source
  - location: Junction of the Black Forest High Road with the B 28, about 10 km west of Freudenstadt
  - coordinates: 48°28′38″N 8°16′29″E
  - elevation: ca. 957 m above sea level (NHN)
- Mouth
  - location: Near Wolfach into the Kinzig
  - coordinates: 48°17′57″N 8°13′12″E
  - elevation: under 260 m above sea level (NHN)
- Length: 30.7 km (19.1 mi)
- Basin size: 127 km^{2} (49 sq mi)

Basin features
- Progression: Kinzig→ Rhine→ North Sea
- Landmarks: Small towns: Wolfach; Villages: Bad Rippoldsau-Schapbach, Oberwolfach

Wolf is a river of Baden-Württemberg, Germany. The historical name of the river is Wolfach. It passes through Bad Rippoldsau-Schapbach and flows into the Kinzig in Wolfach.

One of its tributaries flows over the Burgbach Waterfall, one of the highest free-falling waterfalls in Germany.

== See also ==
- List of rivers of Baden-Württemberg
