= Biberach, Baden =

Biberach
- Municipality
- Coat of arms

- Location of Biberach within Ortenaukreis district
- Interactive map of Biberach
- Location within Germany Location within Baden-Württemberg
- Coordinates: 48°20′19″N 8°1′54″E
- Country: Germany
- State: Baden-Württemberg
- Admin. region: Freiburg
- District: Ortenaukreis

Government
  - Mayor (2022–30): Jonas Breig

Area
  - Total: 22.39 km^{2} (8.64 sq mi)
- Elevation: 188 m (617 ft)

Population (2025-12-31)
  - Total: 3,778
  - Density: 168.7/km^{2} (437.0/sq mi)
- Time zone: UTC+01:00 (CET)
  - Summer (DST): UTC+02:00 (CEST)
- Postal codes: 77781
- Dialling codes: 07835
- Vehicle registration: OG, BH, KEL, LR, WOL
- Website: www.biberach-baden.de

Biberach (German pronunciation: [ˈbiːbəʁax], Low Alemannic: Biibere) is a municipality in the district of Ortenau in Baden-Württemberg in Germany.

== Mayors ==
- 1892–1904: Gustav Isidor Schweiß
- 1904–1913: Josef Ringwald
- 1913–1921: Gustav Karl Schweiß
- 1921–1923: Franz Xaver Jehle
- 1924–1930: Leonhard Willmann
- 1930–1935: Josef Himmelsbach
- 1935–1943: Theodor Seiberlich
- 1943–1946: Johann Dürrholder
- 1946–1953: Hermann Kühn
- 1953–1974: Karl Allgeier
- 1974–1998: Wolfgang Bösinger
- 1998–2014: Hans Peter Heizmann
- 2014–2022: Daniela Paletta
- since 2022: Jonas Breig
