= Schenkenzell =

- Municipality
- Coat of arms

- Location of Schenkenzell within Rottweil district
- Interactive map of Schenkenzell
- Location within Germany Location within Baden-Württemberg
- Coordinates: 48°18′34″N 08°22′17″E
- Country: Germany
- State: Baden-Württemberg
- Admin. region: Freiburg
- District: Rottweil
- Subdivisions: 3 Ortsteile

Government
  - Mayor (2017–25): Bernd Heinzelmann

Area
  - Total: 42.14 km^{2} (16.27 sq mi)
- Elevation: 361 m (1,184 ft)

Population (2025-12-31)
  - Total: 1,833
  - Density: 43.50/km^{2} (112.7/sq mi)
- Time zone: UTC+01:00 (CET)
  - Summer (DST): UTC+02:00 (CEST)
- Postal codes: 77773
- Dialling codes: 07836
- Vehicle registration: RW
- Website: Schenkenzell.de

Schenkenzell is a village in the district of Rottweil, in Baden-Württemberg, Germany. The town is twinned with Schenkon in Switzerland.
