= Bad Rippoldsau-Schapbach =

- Municipality
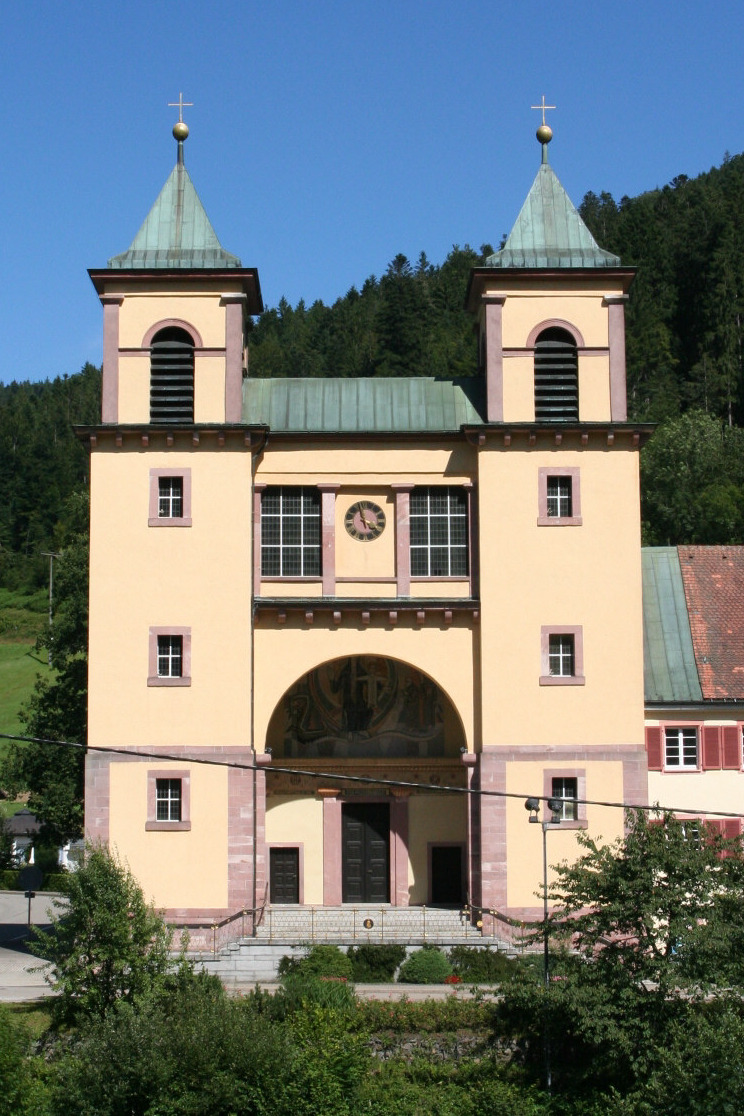
- Church of Our Lady of Sorrows

- Coat of arms

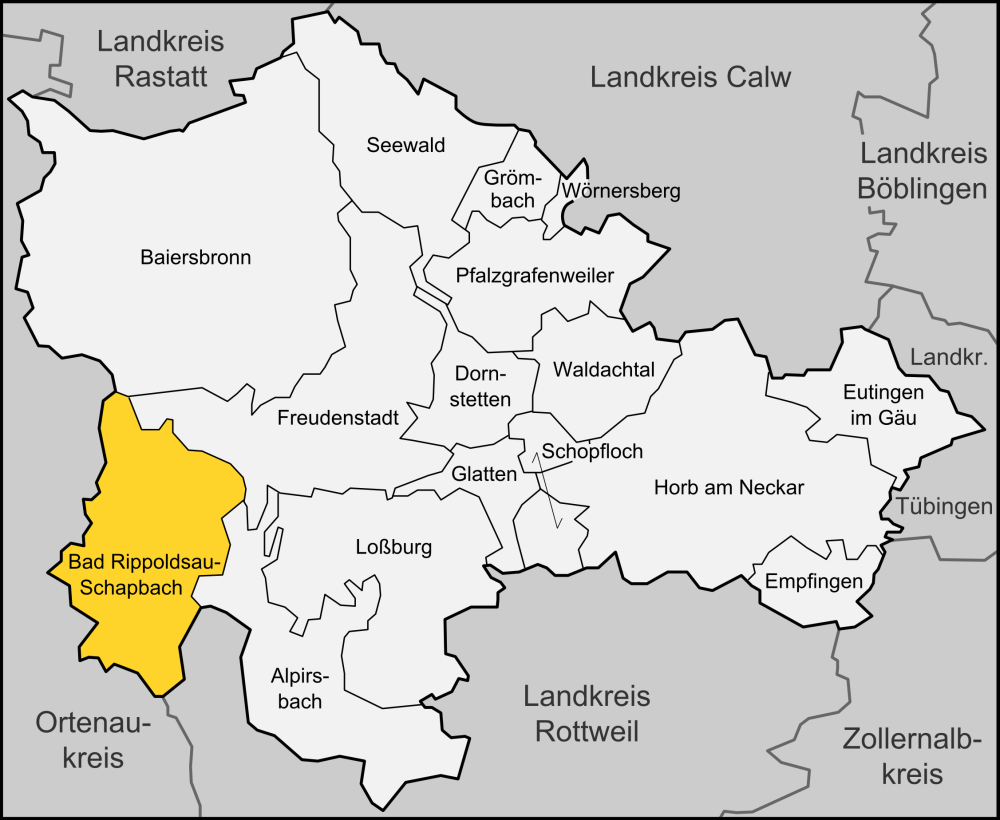
- Location of Bad Rippoldsau-Schapbach within Freudenstadt district
- Interactive map of Bad Rippoldsau-Schapbach
- Location within Germany Location within Baden-Württemberg
- Coordinates: 48°22′38″N 8°17′31″E
- Country: Germany
- State: Baden-Württemberg
- Admin. region: Karlsruhe
- District: Freudenstadt

Government
  - Mayor (2023–31): Bernhard Waidele (CDU)

Area
  - Total: 73.14 km^{2} (28.24 sq mi)
- Elevation: 410 m (1,350 ft)

Population (2025-12-31)
  - Total: 2,025
  - Density: 27.69/km^{2} (71.71/sq mi)
- Time zone: UTC+01:00 (CET)
  - Summer (DST): UTC+02:00 (CEST)
- Postal codes: 77776
- Dialling codes: 07440, 07839
- Vehicle registration: FDS, HCH, HOR, WOL
- Website: www.bad-rippoldsau-schapbach.de

Bad Rippoldsau-Schapbach (Low Alemannic: Ribbeldsau-Schaba) is a municipality in the district of Freudenstadt in Baden-Württemberg in southern Germany.

== Geography ==
The municipality is located in the Black Forest in the Wolftal valley, 15 km away from Freudenstadt. It is divided into two villages, Bad Rippoldsau and Schapbach. Bad Rippoldsau has an elevation of 560 meters and Schapbach has an elevation of 410 meters.

== History ==
The first historical mention of Bad Rippoldsau was in 1179, of Schapbach in 1220. Until 1974 the two villages were two municipalities, but then they became one. Since the 15th century there has been a spa in Bad Rippoldsau.

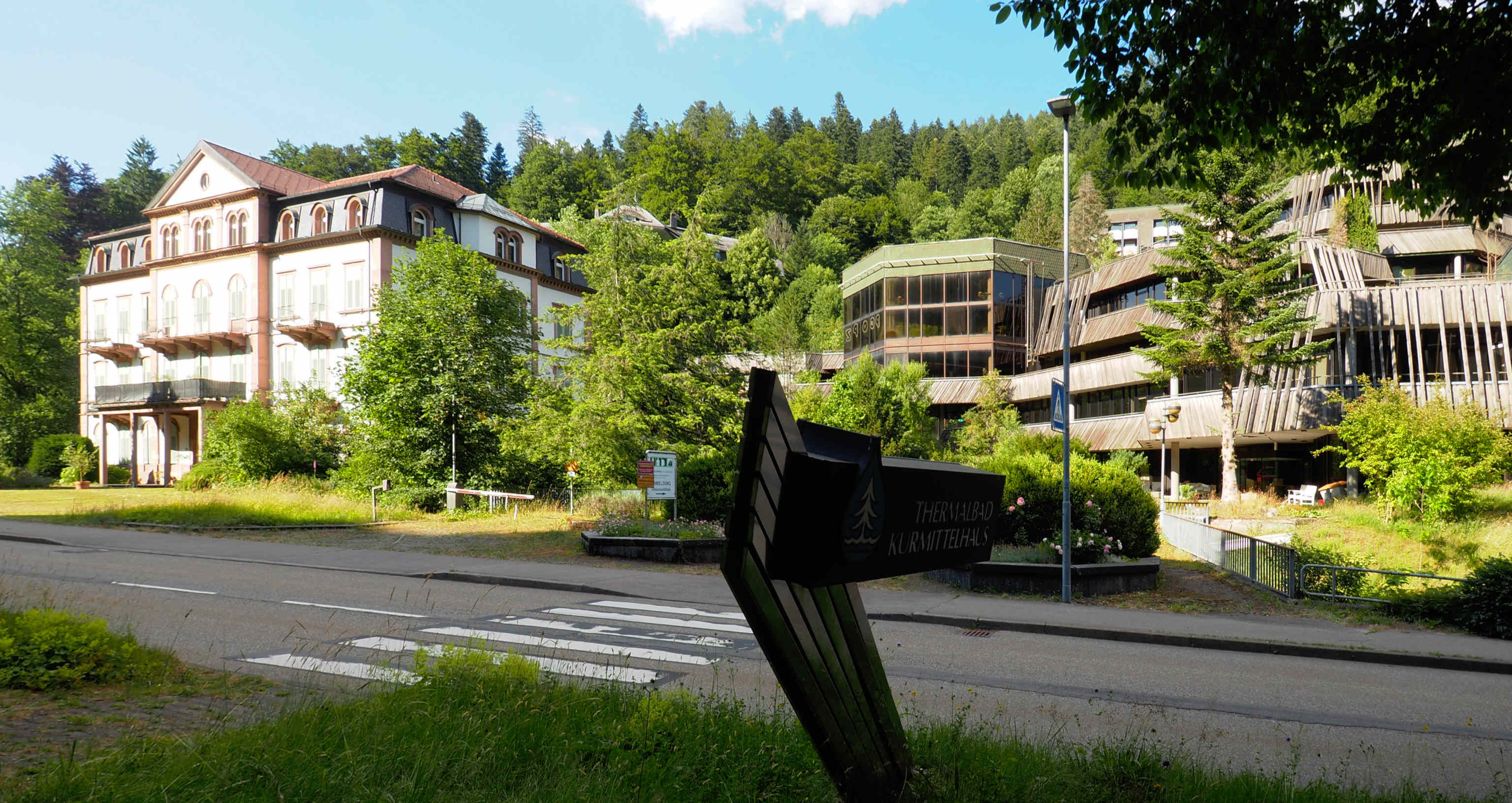
Spa centre, princes’ house from 1865 and black forest spa from 1977, both vacant in 2025

== Sights ==
- The Catholic pilgrimage church of Bad Rippoldsau, which was built in 1829 by Christoph Arnold, a pupil of Friedrich Weinbrenner.
- The baroque church of Schapbach
- The Kastelstein, a rock near Bad Rippoldsau.
- The Glaswaldsee, a cirque lake which was formed by glaciers during the last ice age
- The Burgbach Waterfall, at 32 metres, is one of the highest free-falling cascades in Germany
- From September 2010 there has been a wildlife park here with bears and wolves, located between the villages of Schapbach and Bad Rippoldsau.

=== Sport and recreation facilities ===
- The spa of Bad Rippoldsau
- The open air bath in Schapbach

== Personality ==
- George Michael Gaisser (1595–1655), Prior in St. Nicholas and Lord in Klosterbad Rippoldsau during the Thirty Years' War
- Christian Haldenwang (1770–1831), artist and engraver, buried in Bad Rippoldsau
- Christoph Arnold (1779–1844), architect, builder of Rippoldsau Catholic Church
- Joseph Victor von Scheffel (1826–1886), writer, poet of The emergence of Rippoldsau or the story of brother Rippold and The Sweden in Rippoldsau
- Heinrich Hans Jacob (1837–1916), writer, author of numerous stories about the Wolf valley
- Marc Rosenberg (1852–1930), art historian, philologist and collector, owner of the "Schlössle" on the Schmiedsberg in Schapbach where parts of his collections were housed.
- Rainer Maria Rilke (1875–1926), poet, spa guest in Bad Rippoldsau
- Anna Schmid (1928–2010), long-time head of Rippoldsauer old plant, holder of the Federal Order of Merit
- Chris Weller (born 1957), musician and composer, grew up in Schapbach
