= Westweg =

Long-distance hiking trail in Germany

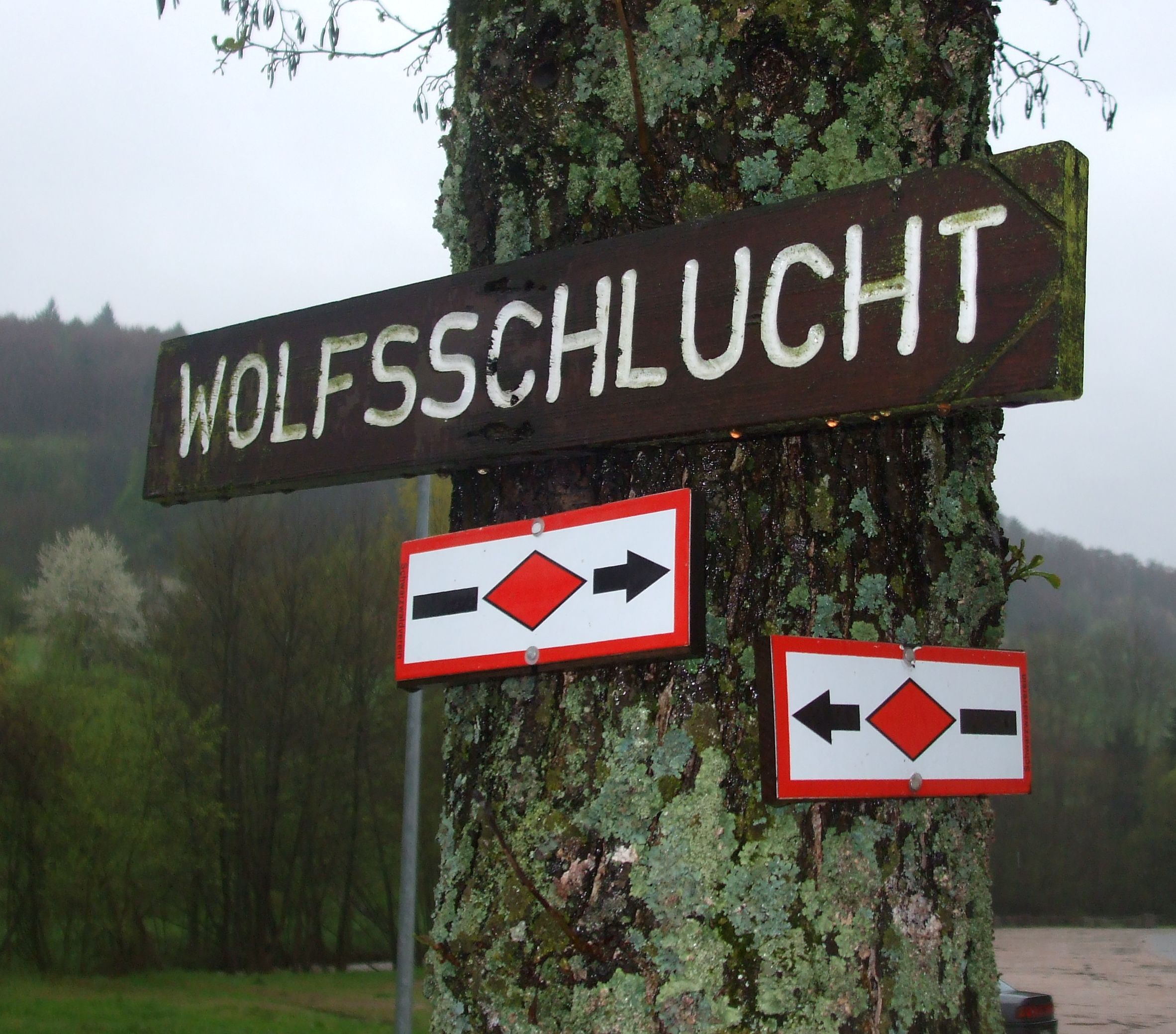
- The Westweg enters the Wolfsschlucht near Kandern
- Length: 285 km (177 mi)
- Location: Black Forest, Germany
- Trailheads: Pforzheim, Basel
- Use: Hiking

Westweg Trail Marker

The Westweg ("West Way" or "West Trail") is a long-distance hiking trail in Germany, running north–south through the Black Forest from Pforzheim to Basel. The trail is around 285 km long, and was founded in 1900. It is currently maintained under the auspices of the Black Forest Club. The trail symbol is a red lozenge on a white background. The Westweg is a part of the European Long-distance Trail E1 (North Cape, Norway - Sicily) The route passes through or near numerous villages or small towns, so there is no difficulty in finding overnight accommodation and meals along the route. It would actually require more planning to walk it while staying in youth hostel-type accommodation, or camping. There are a number of services that will transport your luggage to the next accommodation by vehicle, leaving the hikers with only their daypacks for the hike. The route can be accessed at several places along its length by road or public transport, so it is easy to walk part of it or to do day walks along its route.

== Route Description ==
The Westweg begins in Pforzheim, then leads through the Enz valley to the Dobel, then through wide forests and moors to the Hohloh. After descending into the Murg valley, the trail climbs to the highest point in the northern Black Forest, the Hornisgrinde. The next section follows the Schwarzwaldhochstraße (Black Forest High Street) to Alexanderschanze, and then through the Kinzig valley to Hausach. After a steep climb the Westweg leads from the Martinskapelle (the source of the Breg) to Kalten Herberge, the European continental divide between the Rhine and Danube rivers. At the Feldberg saddle the Westweg forks into an eastern and a western section. The western route (Variation A) runs over the Feldberg, Belchen, and Blauen to Kandern, then through the Wolfschlucht to the Wiese valley, and on to Basel. The eastern section (Variation B) branches southward to the second highest mountain in the Black Forest, the Herzogenhorn, over the pass between the Wehra and Wiese valleys, toward the Hohe Möhr, by Weil am Rhein and down the Rhine valley to Basel.

== History ==
The current Westweg was created in 1900 by the Baden Section of the Schwarzwaldverein (Black Forest Society). Proposals for the creation of a north–south hiking trail along the crest of the Black Forest go back to 1894.

The Westweg, which was complemented by the Ostweg (East Trail) from Pforzheim to Schaffhausen and the Mittelweg (Middle Trail) from Pforzheim to Waldshut in 1903, has become the model for many other long-distance hiking trails.

On December 15, 2006 the Westweg was awarded the certification of "Qualitätsweg Wanderbares Deutschland". (Quality Trail of Hikable Germany). In order to meet a criterion for this certification, that no more than 20% of the trail could be paved, several stretches of the trail had to be relocated or rebuilt in a more natural setting.

== Dayhikes/Stages ==
=== Stages Shared by Variations A and B ===
==== First Stage: Pforzheim–Dobel ====
===== Main Variant =====
24 km, c. 6 hours walking time

Location/Attractions	Distance in km	Elevation in metres	Additional Information
Pforzheim-Kupferhammer	0	254	Starting point of the three Black Forest long-distance trails, the Westweg (Pforzheim - Basel), Mittleweg (Pforzheim - Waldshut), and the Ostweg (Pforzheim - Schaffhausen)
Dillweißenstein	2.5	270	
Schloss Neuenbürg	9.5	390	
Neuenbürg, Marketplace	0.5	323	
Buchberg, Adventure playground	0.5	460	to Neuenbürg Westweg rejoins the pre-2006 higher variation
Schwanner Warte	3.0	480	to Straubenhardt; Glider port
Herzogswiesen	1.0	520	
Dreimarkstein (Three March Stone)	3.5	660	Shelter hut Named because of the boundary stones for the communities of Dobel, Dennach (part of Neuenbürg), and Conweiler (part of Straubenhardt).
Volzemer Stein	1.5	660	Boulder field
Dobel	2.0	720	Observation tower

===== Higher Variant =====
In 2006 the first stage of the Westweg was relocated. The former stage is now marked as the "High Variation"

Location/Attractions	Distance in km	Elevation in Meters	Additional Information
Pforzheim-Kupferhammer	0	254	Starting point of the three Black Forest long-distance trails, the Westweg (Pforzheim - Basel), Mittleweg (Pforzheim - Waldshut), and the Ostweg (Pforzheim - Schaffhausen)
Pforzheim-Dillstein	2.0	270	
Sonnenberg	1.0	340	
Birkenfeld	2.0	358	
Wilhelmshöhe	6.5	429	to Neuenbürg
Buchberg–Adventure playground	0.5	460	to Neuenbürg Higher variation rejoins the Westweg.

==== Second Stage: Dobel–Forbach ====
25 km, c. 6.5 hours walking time

Location/Attractions	Distance in km	Elevation in Meters	Additional Information
Dobel	0	720	Observation tower
Weithäusle	5.0	823	Shelter hut
Schweizerkopfhütte	1.5	835	Observation pavilion
Hahnenfalzhütte	4.0	876	Hut of the Bad Herrenalb ski club
Absetze	1.5	917	
Kreuzlehütte	2.0	852	
Hohlohturm	2.0	986	Kaiser Wilhelm-Turm observation tower, Shelter hut 500m side trip to the Hohlohsee (a bog).
Prinzenhütte	1.5	976	Shelter hut
Latschigfelsen	2.5	762	
Gausbach	3.0	306	Suburb of Forbach
Forbach	1.0	303	

==== Third Stage: Forbach–Unterstmatt ====
19 km, c. 5.5 hours walking time

Location/Attractions	Distance in km	Elevation in Meters	Additional Information
Forbach	0	303	
Auf Wegscheiden	5.0	751	
Herrenwieser See	1.5	834	Glacial cirque from the last glacial period, c. 9 m deep, c. 600 m circumference.
Bussemer Denkstein (Bussem Monument)	1.0	1003	Philipp Bussemer
Badener Höhe	2.0	1004	Großherzog-Friedrich-Turm observation tower
Herrenwieser Saddle	1.1	879	
Sand	2.6	828	to Bühl; Schwarzwaldhochstraße (B 500)
Hundseck	1.8	856	
Hochkopf	3.0	1041	
Unterstmatt	1.0	928	

==== Fourth Stage: Unterstmatt–Alexanderschanze ====
27.5 km, c. 7 hours walking time

Location/Attractions	Distance in km	Elevation in Meters	Additional Information
Unterstmatt	0	928	
Ochsenstall	2.0	1036	Inn for skiers and hikers
Hornisgrinde	1.0	1164	
Mummelsee	2.0	1034	
Seibelseckle	1.5	956	
Darmstädter Hütte	3.0	1020	
Seekopf	0.5	1040	View of the Wildsee and the grave of Orientalist Julius Euting
Ruhestein	2.5	915	Schwarzwaldhochstraße (B 500)
Schliffkopf	4.0	1055	
Zuflucht	7,5	963	Former hotel, then a youth hostel, currently closed
Alexanderschanze	3,5	968	Crosses the B 28

==== Fifth Stage: Alexanderschanze–Auf der Hark ====
18 km, c. 4.5 hours walking time

This stage and the next can be completed in one day by experienced hikers.

Location/Attractions	Distance in km	Elevation in metres	Additional Information
Alexanderschanze	0	968	
Am kalten Haupt	2.5	936	
Hildahütte	2.0	914	
Lettstädter Höhe	3.0	968	
Lake-level above the Glaswaldsee	1.5	960	Side trip to viewpoint over the Glaswaldsee
Freiersbergsattel	2.0	752	Crosses the pass road Schapbach–Bad Peterstal
Littweger Höhe	2.5	843	Shelter hut. Crosses the Gengenbach–Alpirsbach Black Forest Trail
Auf der Hark	4.5	700	Farm bed and breakfast– to Oberharmersbach

==== Sixth Stage: Auf der Hark–Hausach ====
16.5 km, c. 4 hours walking time

This stage and the previous one can be completed in one day by experienced hikers.

Location/Attractions	Distance in km	Elevation in Meters	Additional Information
Auf der Hark	0	700	
Kreuzsattelhütte	3.0	738	
Trail forks to Brandenkopf	0.2	735	Marked variant: The Brandenkopf is about 3.5 km from the Westweg.
Hirzwasen	1.8	735	Crosses the Great Hansjokob Path
Ebenacker	2.0	620	
Hohenlochen-Hütte	2.5	689	Simple hiker's hut
Käppelehof	0.3	640	Farm bed and breakfast
Weißes Kreuz	0.2	570	
Spitzfelsen	2.0	580	Schutzhütte
Hausach	4.5	237	

==== Seventh Stage: Hausach–Wilhelmshöhe (above Schonach) ====
21.5 km, c. 5.5 hours walking time

Location/Attractions	Distance in km	Elevation in Meters	Additional Information
Hausach	0	237	
Husen Castle ruins	0.5	288	
Farrenkopf / Hasemann Hut	5.5	790	Shelter hut named after artist, Wilhelm Hasemann
Büchereck	3.0	651	
Haselberg	2.0	760	Crosses the Rottweil–Lahr Black Forest Trail
Prechtaler Schanze	0.5	820	
Huberfelsen	1.0	745	Viewpoint
Fährlefelsen	0.5	755	Crosses the Rottweil–Lahr Black Forest Trail
Karlstein	1.5	970	also: Hauenstein Named for the visit of Karl, Duke of Württemberg in 1770; Formerly a Vierländereck (Corner of Four Countries) - Baden, Württemberg, Fürstenberg and Vorderösterreich
Schöne Aussicht	1,0	915	Inn
Rensberg	3,0	940	
Wilhelmshöhe	3,0	980	to Schonach

==== Eighth Stage: Wilhelmshöhe–Kalte Herberge ====
23.5 km, c. 6 hours walking time

Location/Attractions	Distance in km	Elevation in metres	Additional Information
Wilhelmshöhe	0	976	
Wolfsbauernhof	1.5	1023	
Blindensee	1.5	1000	Bog
Weißenbacher Höhe	2.5	1016	
Martinskapelle	3.5	1094	The continental divide between the North Sea and the Black Sea. Near St. Martin's Chapel is the spring of the Breg, one of the sources of the Danube, and the Elz, one of the tributaries of the Rhine.
Brend	3.0	1149	Highest point in the Central Black Forest. Observation tower
Alte Ecke	2.5	1075	
Winkel / Südlicher Staatsberg	2.0	1045	Beginning of a section shared with the Black Forest–Kaiserstuhl–Rhine Trail.
Beim Staatsberghof	1.0	990	End of the section shared with the Black Forest-Kaiserstuhl-Rhine Trail
Neueck	0.5	988	Saddle between Furtwangen and Glottertal
Hausebene-Hof	2.0	940	
Kalte Herberge	3.5	1029	Inn (on the continental divide: water flows off the roof in both directions.)

After the ninth stage these descriptions follow the pre-2006 route. Since then the fork between the eastern and western variations has moved to Titisee. The western branch leads from there over the ridge between Titisee and Hinterzarten toward Oberzarten. From there it follows the Emil Thomas Path to the peak of the Feldberg, where it rejoins its former route. After Kandern the trail now goes through the Wolfschlucht to Wollbach. The eastern variation follows its former path through the Bärental, the Zweiseenblick, the Cartitasheim, and then on toward Herzogenhorn

==== Ninth Stage: Kalte Herberge–Bärental (Pre-2006) ====
26.5 km, c. 6.5 hours walking time

Location/Attractions	Distance in km	Elevation in Meters	Additional Information
Kalte Herberge	0	1029	
Lachenhäusle	3.0	1080	
Schweizerhof	3.5	1040	Inn
Fürsatzhöhe	9.5	1071	
Geigershof	1.5	940	
Titisee	2.5	823	Crosses the Freiburg-Lake Constance Black Forest Trail
Bärental	6.5	967	Highest Deutsche Bahn station on the trail

=== Variation A - Western Route ===
==== Tenth Stage: Bärental–Wiedener Eck (pre-2006) ====
24.5 km, c. 6 hours walking time

Location/Attractions	Distance in km	Elevation in Meters	Additional Information
Bärental	0	967	
Zweiseenblick	3.0	1284	Viewpoint over the Titisee and Schluchsee
Feldberg-Caritasheim	2.5	1230	Plan time to stop at Feldsee (lake)!
Feldbergerhof	1.5	1279	
Bismarck-Denkmal	1.0	1448	View over the Feldsee
Feldberg- Peak	2.0	1495	Highest point of the Westweg and the entire Black Forest.
Stübenwasen	3.5	1241	Inn; incredible view about 1km toward Notschrei
Notschrei	5.0	1121	Hotel; Nordic training area
Am Trubelsmattkopf	2.5	1282	
Wiedener Eck	3.5	1037	Hotel

==== Eleventh Stage: Wiedener Eck–Blauen (pre-2006) ====
21 km, c. 5.5 hours walking time

Location/Attractions	Distance in km	Elevation in Meters	Additional Information
Wiedener Eck	0	1037	
Krinne	4.0	1119	
Belchen	2.0	1414	Café; view
Hohe Kelch	1.5	1266	
Haldenhof	3.5	900	Inn
Sirnitz-Saddle	1.5	1073	
Stühle	3.0	1049	Shelter hut
Egerten-Saddle	3.0	927	Shelter hut
Hochblauen	2.5	1167	

==== Twelfth Stage: Blauen–Basel (pre-2006) ====
32.5 km, c. 8 hours walking time

Location/Attractions	Distance in km	Elevation in Meters	Additional Information
Hochblauen	0	1167	Gasthause; Extensive views
Hexenplatz	2.5	845	
Sausenburg	3.5	665	
Kandern	4.0	352	
Egerten-Nebenau	6.0	456	
Burg Rötteln	5.0	417	Castle; cafe
Tüllingen	6.5	422	Suburb of Lörrach
Basel	5.0	260	

=== Variation B – Eastern Route ===
==== Tenth Stage: Bärental–Hochkopfhaus (pre-2006) ====
26.5 km, c. 7 hours walking time

Location/Attractions	Distance in km	Elevation in Meters	Additional Information
Bärental	0	967	
Zweiseenblick	3.0	1284	Viewpoint over the Titisee and the Schluchsee.
Feldberg-Caritasheim	2.5	1230	
Feldbergerhof	1.5	1279	
Zeiger	1.0	1231	
Grafenmatt	1.7	1377	Inn
Glockenführe	0.8	1320	Path up the Herzogenhorn (1415 m)
Hof Eck	3.5	1127	
Auf der Wacht	3.0	975	
Blößling	2.5	1309	Steep climb
Präger Eck	2.0	1103	
Leder Tschobenstein	2.0	1212	
Hochkopfhaus	3.0	1087	Schwarzwaldverein hiking center

==== Eleventh Stage: Hochkopfhaus–Schweigmatt (pre-2006) ====
18.5 km, c. 5 hours walking time

Location/Attractions	Distance in km	Elevation in Meters	Additional Information
Hochkopfhaus	0	1081	
St. Antoni	2.0	1064	
Altensteiner Eck	3.0	1090	
Altensteiner Kreuz	1.5	1064	
Sägbaumdumpf	1.3	1040	
Schwellen	4.2	1001	Gersbach (Südschwarzwald), winner of two village "beauty pageants":Bundesgolddorf in 2004, Europagolddorf in 2007
Hohe Möhr	4.5	985	Observation tower, the top of which is over 1000 meters above sea level. (The last time above 1000m on the trail)
Schweigmatt	2.0	725	

==== Twelfth Stage: Schweigmatt–Adelhausen (pre-2006) ====
18 km, c. 4.5 hours walking time

Location/Attractions	Distance in km	Elevation in Meters	Additional Information
Schweigmatt	0	725	
Hasel	3.5	440	Erdmannshöhle
Hohe Flum	9.5	535	
Adelhausen	5.0	459	Suburb of Rheinfelden

==== Thirteenth Stage: Adelhausen–Basel (pre-2006) ====
18 km, c. 4.5 hours walking time

Location/Attractions	Distance in km	Elevation in Meters	Additional Information
Adelhausen	0	459	
Sieben Bannstein	4.0	451	
Rührberg	6.5	510	Suburb of Grenzach-Wyhlen
Basel	10.0	260	Ending point is the Basel Badischer Bahnhof
