= Farrenkopf =

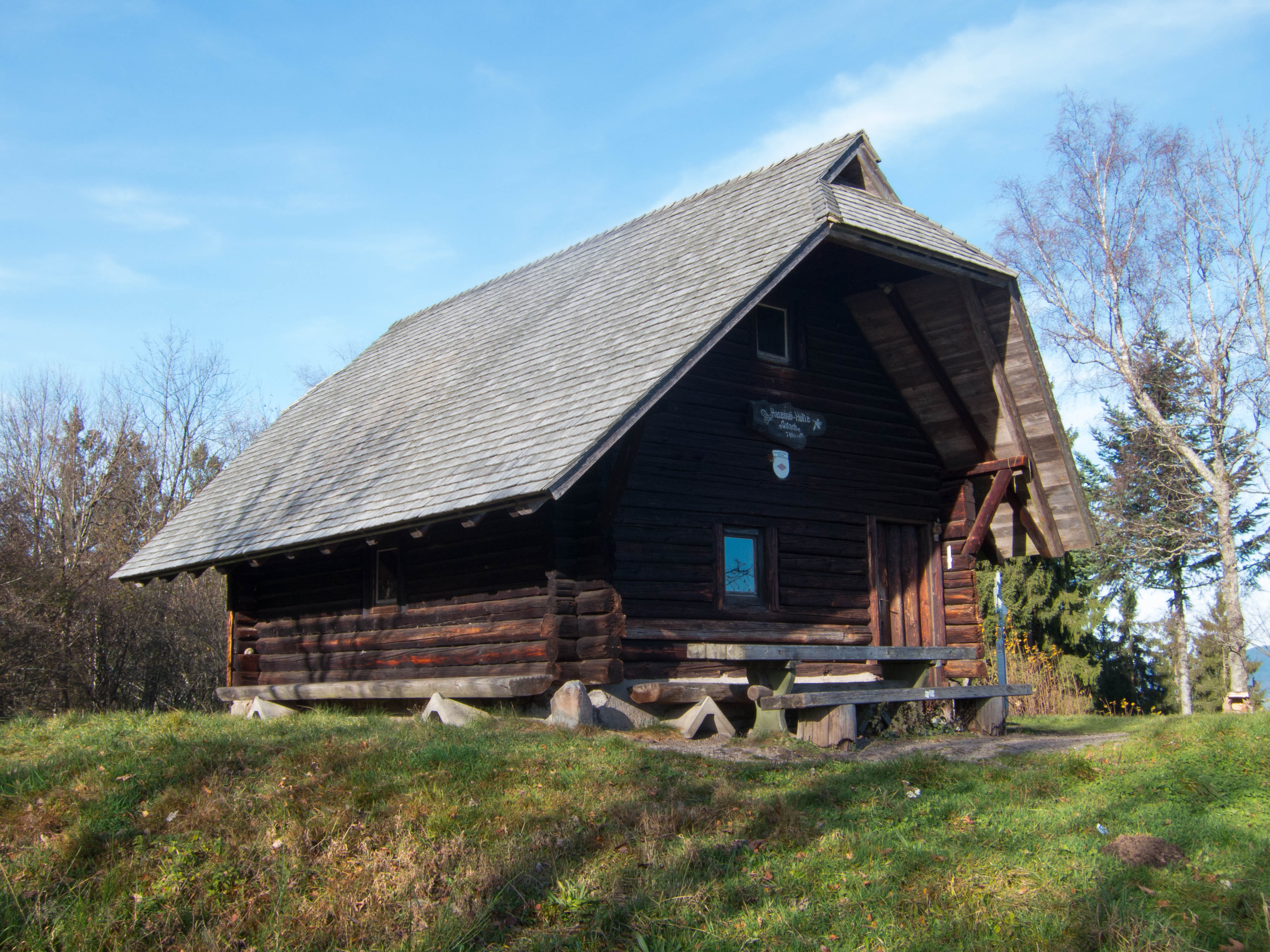
- The Hasemann Hut on the Farrenkopf

Highest point
- Elevation: 789 m above sea level (NHN) (2,589 ft)Category:Mountains under 1000 metres
- Coordinates: 48°15′24″N 8°10′53″E

Geography
- Location within Baden-Württemberg
- Location: Ortenaukreis, Baden-Württemberg, Germany
- Parent range: Black Forest

The Farrenkopf (788.5 m above sea level (NHN)), also known as the "Rigi of the Central Black Forest" is a mountain with extensive views in the Black Forest near the town of Hausach in the Kinzig valley.

== Tourism ==
The mountain is cross by part of the West Way from Hausach to the Büchereck. Another waymarked ascent runs from Gutach (Schwarzwaldbahn). On the Farrenkopf is the Hasemann Hut, named after artist, Prof. Wilhelm Hasemann.

== Literature ==
- Julius Wais: Schwarzwaldführer, 3rd edn., in Kommission bei A. Bonz’ Erben, Stuttgart, 1913, p. 211
- Landesamt für Geoinformation und Landesentwicklung: Freizeitkarte 1:50,000 Offenburg Ortenau Kinzigtal, 2nd edn. 2009, ISBN 978-3-89021-596-9
