= Max Wilhelm Roman =

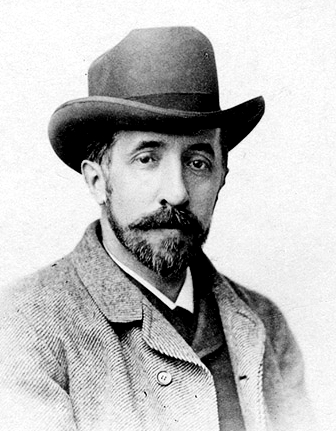
Max Wilhelm Roman (date unknown)

Max Wilhelm Roman (30 April 1849, in Freiburg im Breisgau – 8 May 1910, in Karlsruhe) was a German landscape painter and lithographer.

== Life and work ==
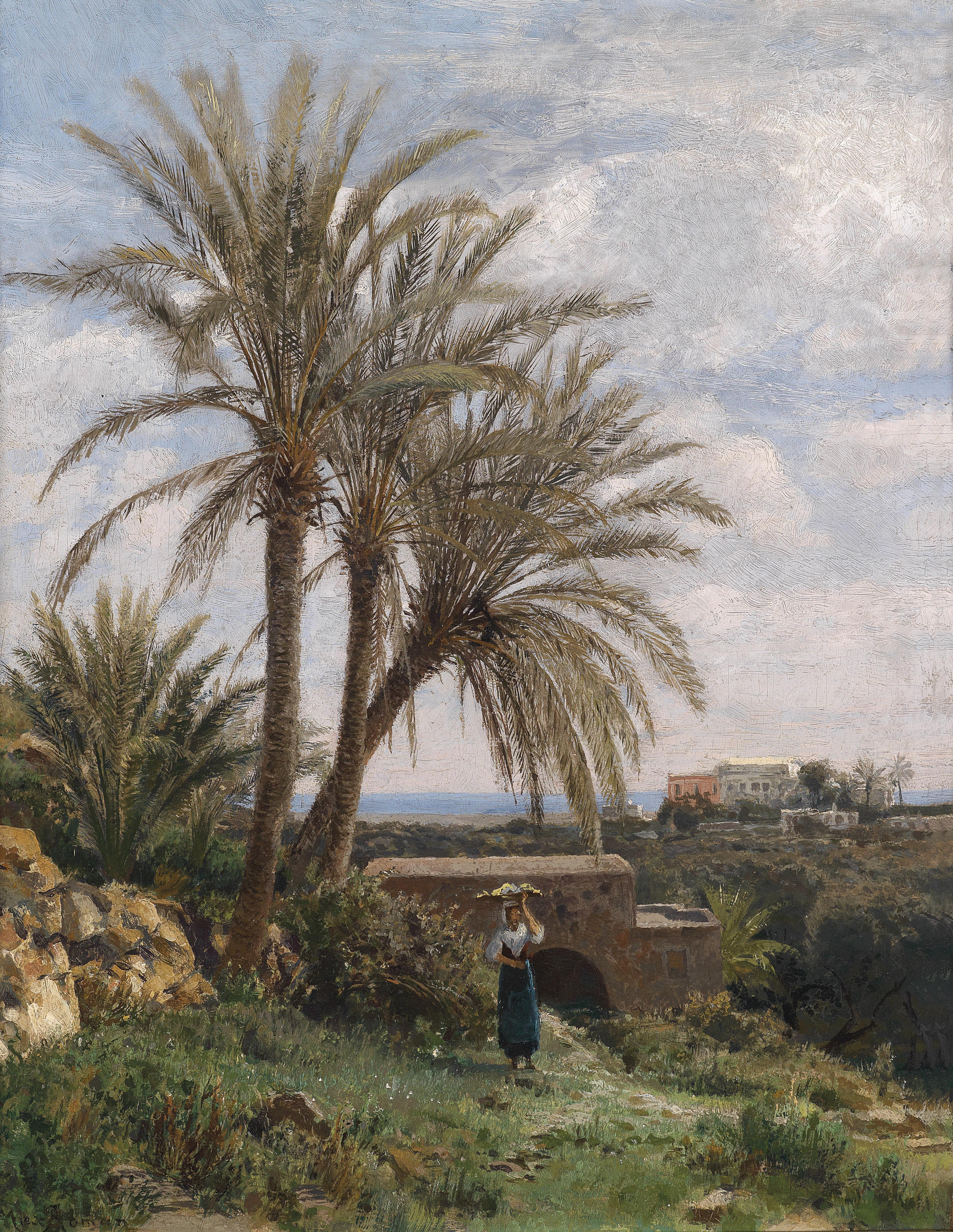
Villa in Tivoli

His father was a senior civil servant. He completed his initial studies in Nürnberg. In 1871, together with his teacher, Emil Lugo, he made a study trip to Italy and painted some of his first landscapes in Olevano Romano. It would be the first of many such trips he would make throughout his life. In 1873, he returned to Germany, settling in Karlsruhe where, from 1874 to 1883, he studied at the Academy of Fine Arts, under Hans Fredrik Gude, Eugen Bracht and Gustav Schönleber.

Together with his older brother, Victor, (1841–1916), a drawing teacher at the Bender’schen Lehranstalten in Weinheim, he would often make excursions through the Black Forest. There, he sketched his impressions of farms and villages that were later incorporated into his landscapes. The artists' colony near Gutach was one of his favorite destinations. In 1890 he, Wilhelm Hasemann, Emil Lugo, and Karl Eyth (1856-1929), provided illustrations for Der Schwarzwald by the poet, Wilhelm Jensen.

In 1886, he was hired as a teacher at the newly founded Women's Art School, and was promoted to manager in 1895. Meanwhile, in 1891, he had married the painter and graphic artist, Käthe Försterling, from Dresden, daughter of the painter Otto Försterling. She was twenty-two years his junior. He had met her at the art school, where she taught flower painting. She also worked as an illustrator and ceramist. In 1899, they both became members of the Künstlerbunds Karlsruhe (Artists' Association).

He died in 1910, at the age of sixty-one. Käthe had previously returned to Dresden with their children, Maria and Wilhelm. She had given up teaching in 1907, citing the children's health, but Roman apparently had her declared mentally incapacitated when she filed for a divorce. She continued to work as a free-lance artist. Her date of death is unknown. She may have emigrated to the United States in 1930.

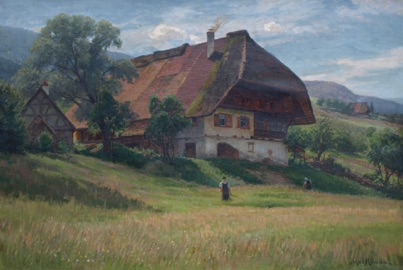
The "Steinadeshof" in Gutach
