= Büchereck =

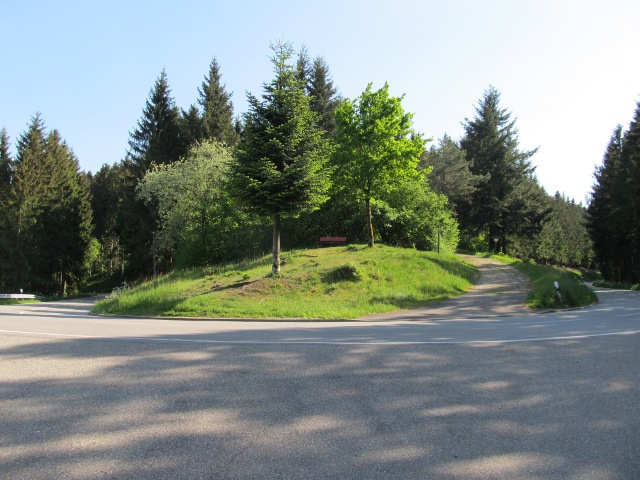
- Summit
- Interactive map of Büchereck
- Elevation: 651DE-NHN
- Traversed by: Landesstraße L 107

Third Approach
- Location: Baden-Württemberg
- Range: Black Forest
- Coordinates: 48°14′17″N 8°10′35″E

The Büchereck is a mountain pass (651 m above sea level (NHN)) in the Black Forest in southern Germany between Elzach in the Elz valley and Gutach (Schwarzwaldbahn) in the Gutach valley.

The Landesstraße L 107 runs across the pass from Gutach (Schwarzwaldbahn), as well as the somewhat lower lying Landwassereck (630.6 m above NHN) with its inn, to Oberprechtal and on to Elzach.

== Location and area ==
At the summit of the pass is a car park for walkers; about 200 metres to the north is the Büchereck Hut.

North of the summit is the Scheibeneck (653.3 m above NHN) and to the south is the Hundseckle (790.3 m above NHN). Both north and south of the summit there are Baroque Schanzen from the late 17th century.

The West Way, part of the E1 European long distance path, crosses the road at the Büchereck.
