= Black Forest Open Air Museum =

Open-air museum in Black Forest, Germany

Coordinates: 48°16′17″N 8°11′53″E

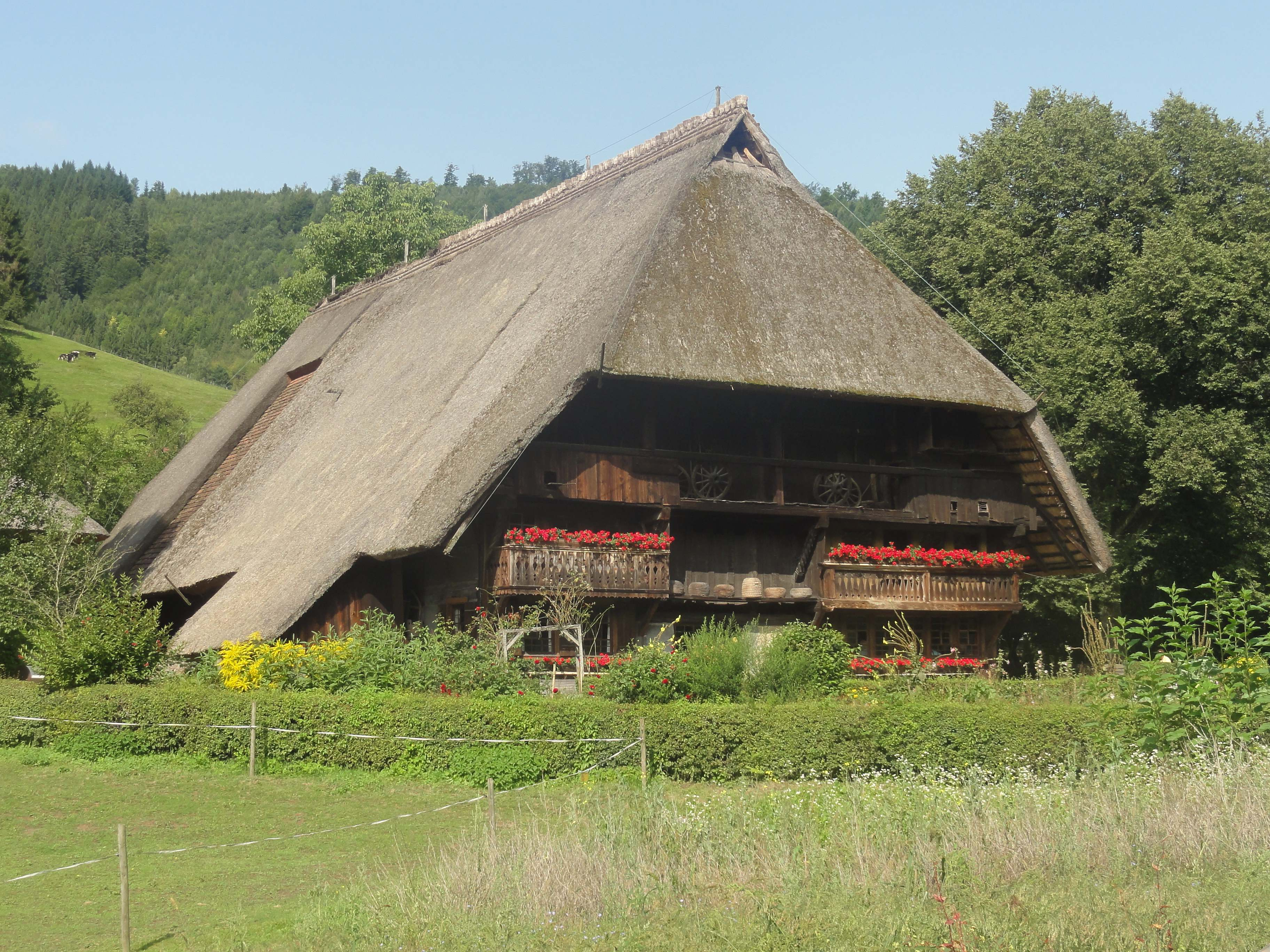
- Vogtsbauernhof (view from the southeast)
- Established: 1964
- Location: Black Forest, Germany
- Type: Open-air museums, Local museum
- Visitors: 220,000 (opened 7 months a year)
- Website: https://www.vogtsbauernhof.de/en

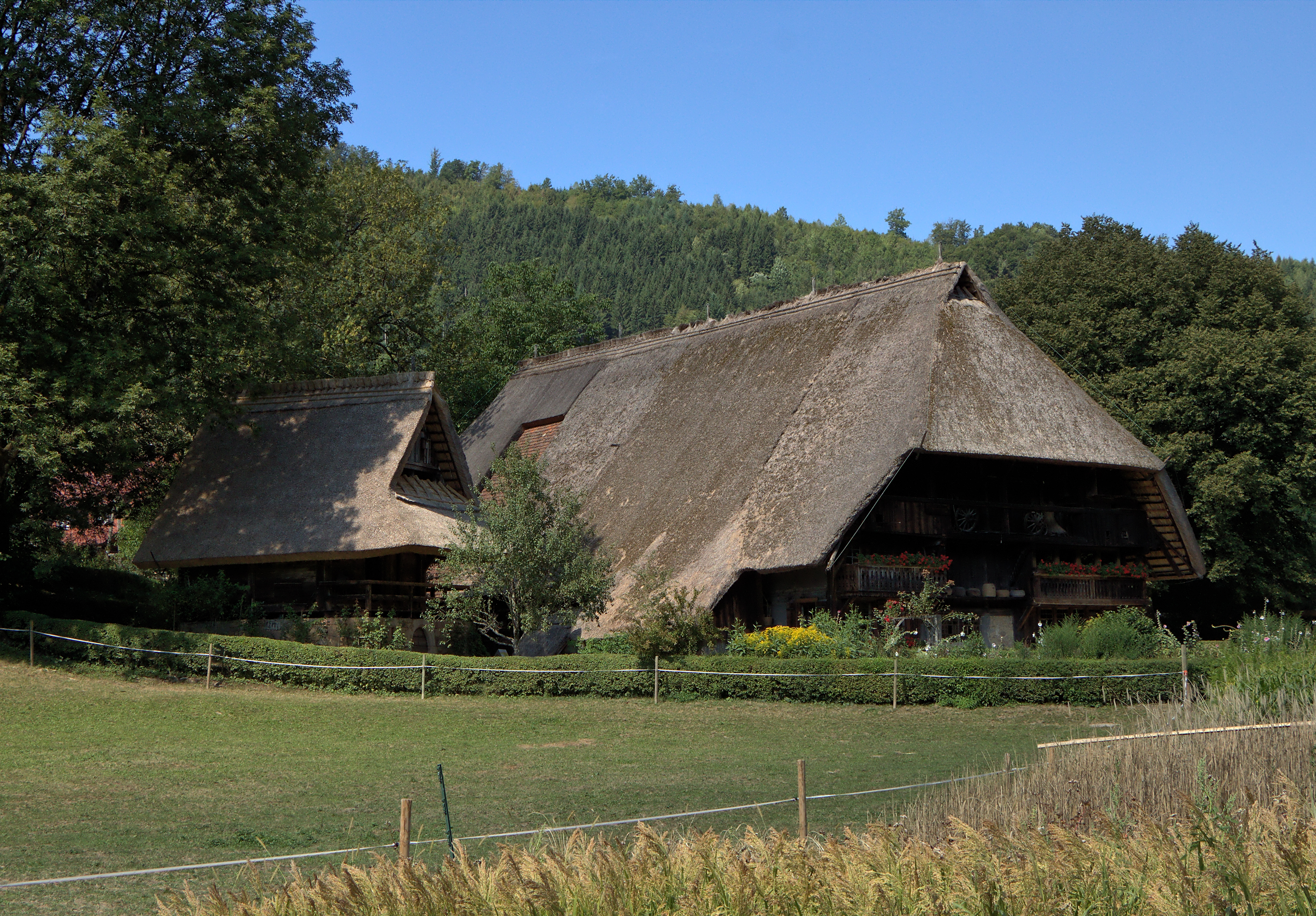
The Vogtsbauernhof farmhouse from 1612

The Black Forest Open Air Museum (German: Schwarzwälder Freilichtmuseum Vogtsbauernhof) is an open-air museum located between Hausach and Gutach in the Black Forest (Germany).

The museum is centred on the Vogtsbauernhof farmhouse dating from 1612, which was built on this site. Other buildings from the Black Forest have been dismantled, transported to the museum and reassembled. The museum has attracted over 16 million visitors since its opening in 1964.

== Attractions ==
There are six fully furnished farmhouses:

- Vogtsbauernhof – built on the site, elevation 260 m, in 1612. Inside is an exhibition of typical work carried out by travelling craftsmen.
- Hotzenwaldhaus – from Hotzenwald, elevation 920 m. Built in 1756. Exhibition of Black Forest textile handicraft.
- Falkenhof – from the Dreisam Valley, elevation 530 m. Built in 1737. Exhibitions are on dairy and livestock farming in the Black Forest and a comparison of historical and modern light sources.
- Schauinslandhaus – from Schauinsland, elevation 1,100 m. Built in 1730. Exhibition of woodworking craft.
- Hippenseppenhof – from Furtwangen-Katzensteig, elevation 920 m. Built in 1599. Exhibitions on clocks and traditional costumes of the Black Forest.
- Lorenzenhof – from Oberwolfach in the Kinzig valley, 350 m. Built in 1608. Exhibitions of forestry management and glassblowing and a collection of regional stone and minerals.

There is also the Ortenauhaus from Durbach. The half timbered residential building was built in 1775 and renovated in 1961. The furniture is from 1961 and shows life in the 20th century.

Other buildings include a day labourer's cottage (1819) and outbuildings including a mill (1609), a sawmill (1673), barns, stalls, a chapel (1736), a storehouse (1601–1746) and a granny house (Leibgedinghaus,1652).

Around the buildings are farm animals and a herb garden with over 130 medicinal herbs. Demonstrations of exhibitions illustrate the crafts, tools, customs, traditions, work and lifestyle of former times.

== History ==
The museum opened in 1964, founded as the first open-air museum in Baden-Württemberg. Key events in the museum's history are:

- 1963 Foundation of the museum and beginning of restoration of Vogtsbauernhof farmstead
- 1964 Opening of Vogtsbauernhof farmstead and its outbuildings
- 1966 Opening of Hippenseppenhof farmstead and its outbuildings
- 1972 Opening of Lorenzenhof farmstead
- 1980 Opening of Hotzenwald farmstead
- 1982 Opening of Schauinsland farmstead
- 1996 Museum is transferred into an enterprise
- 1999 Opening of Falkenhof farmstead
- 2002 Opening of Day labourer's Cottage "Wirtstonis"
- 2006 Opening of the new Reception building
- 2010 Opening of the new Adventure playground
- 2014 Opening of the Gutach Freilichtmuseum railway station

== Visiting ==
The museum is open daily from the end of March until early November. It claims to be the most visited open-air museum in Germany and one of the most visited throughout Europe, with more than 250,000 visitors a year. Since its opening, the museum has attracted over 13.5 million visitors.

== Photo gallery ==
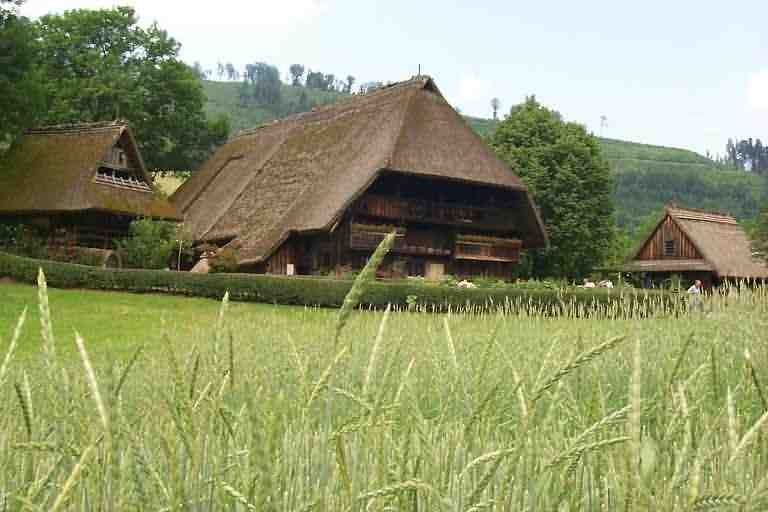
The Vogtsbauernhof is the only farm in the museum which is still standing in its original location.

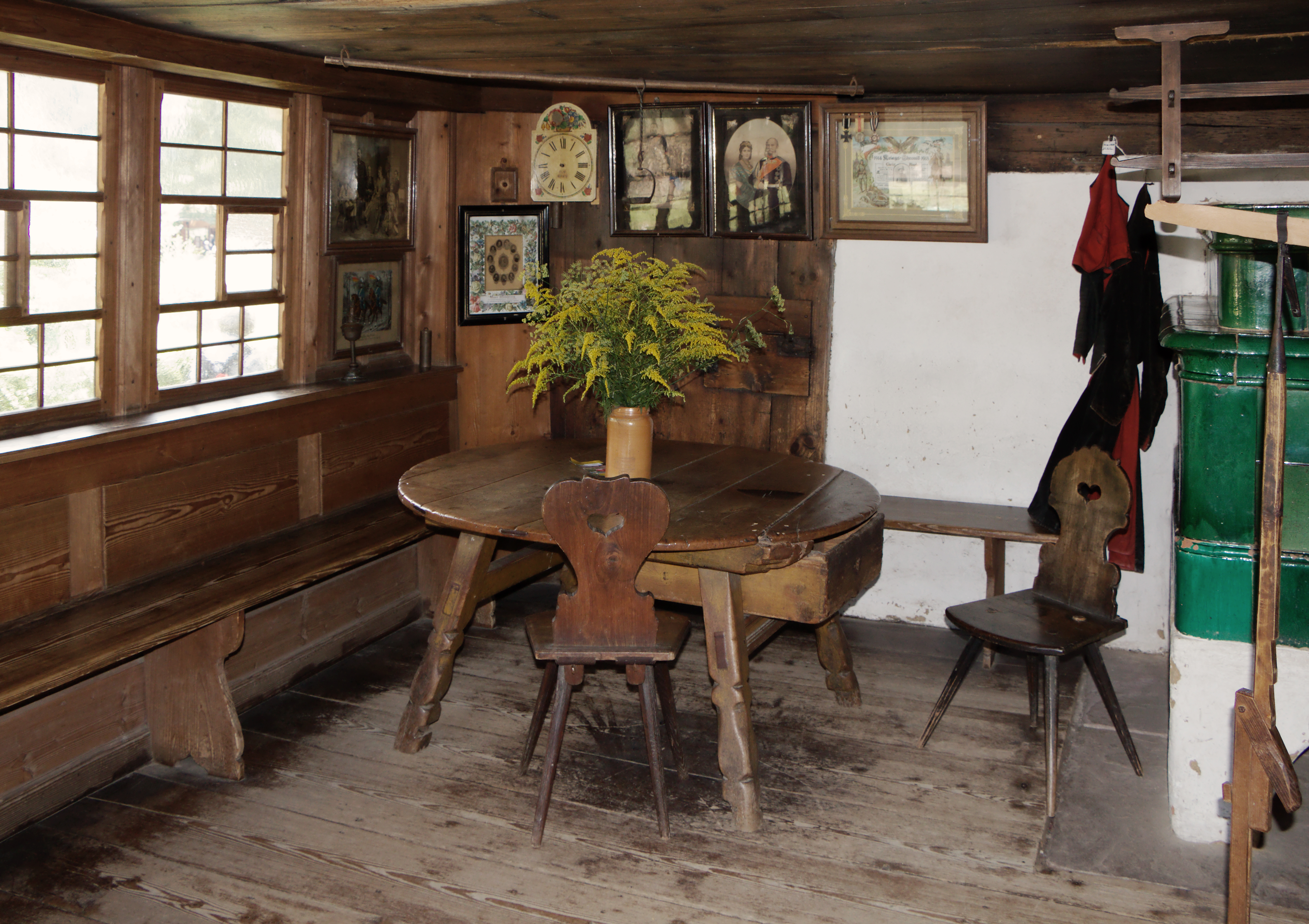
Inside the Vogtsbauernhof

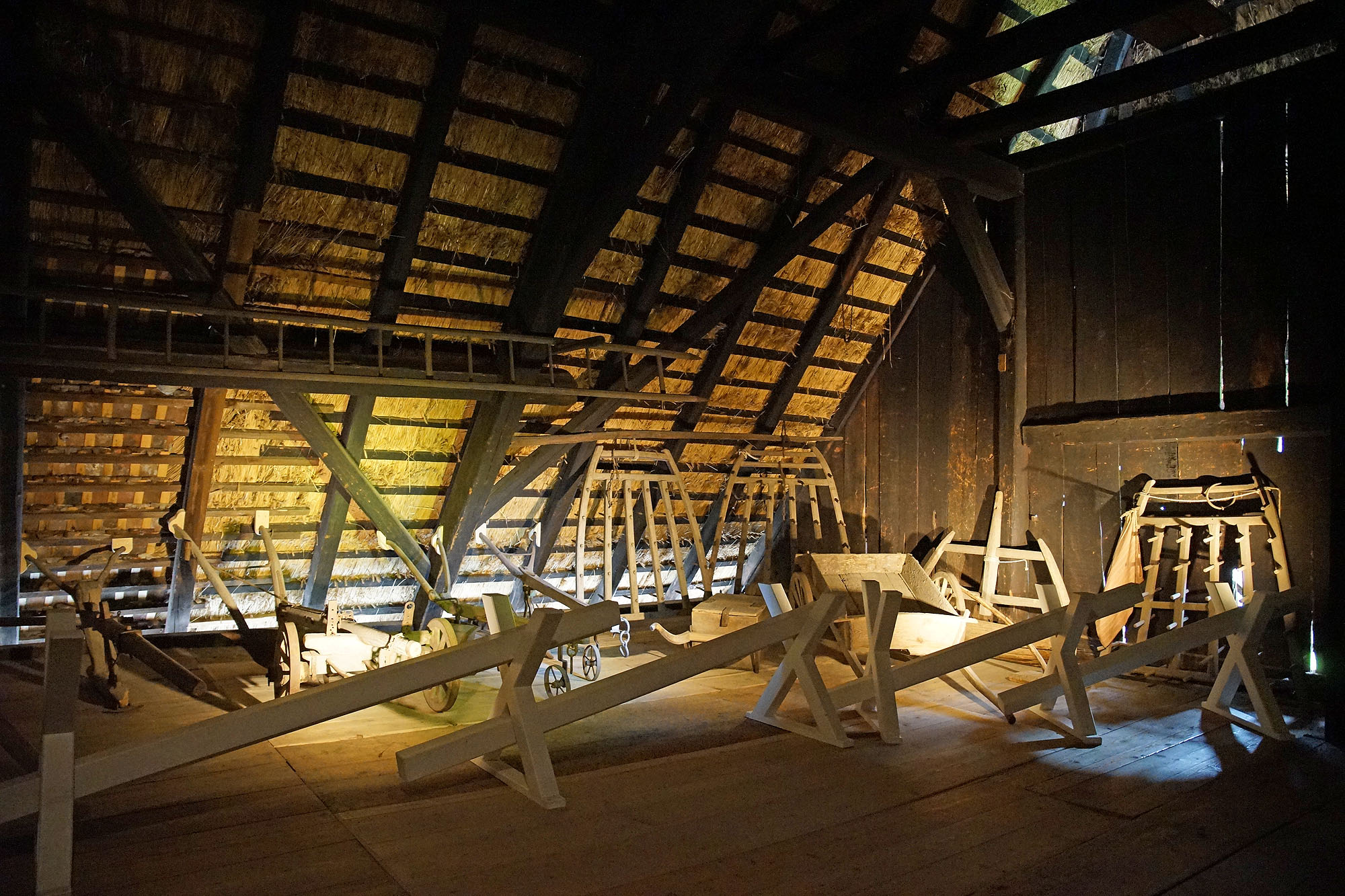
Inside the Vogtsbauernhof

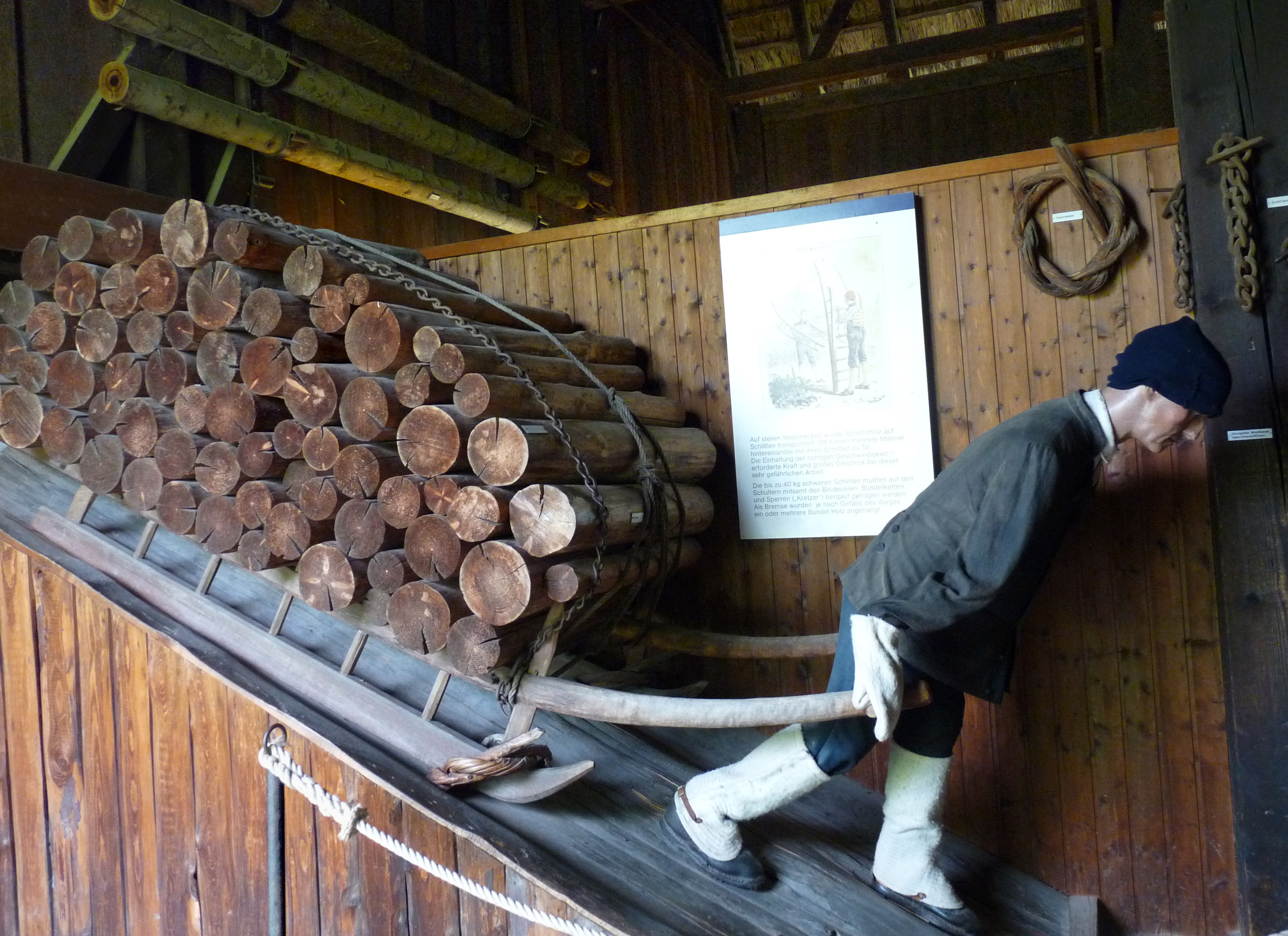
Inside of the Vogtsbauernhof: the scene of a wood worker

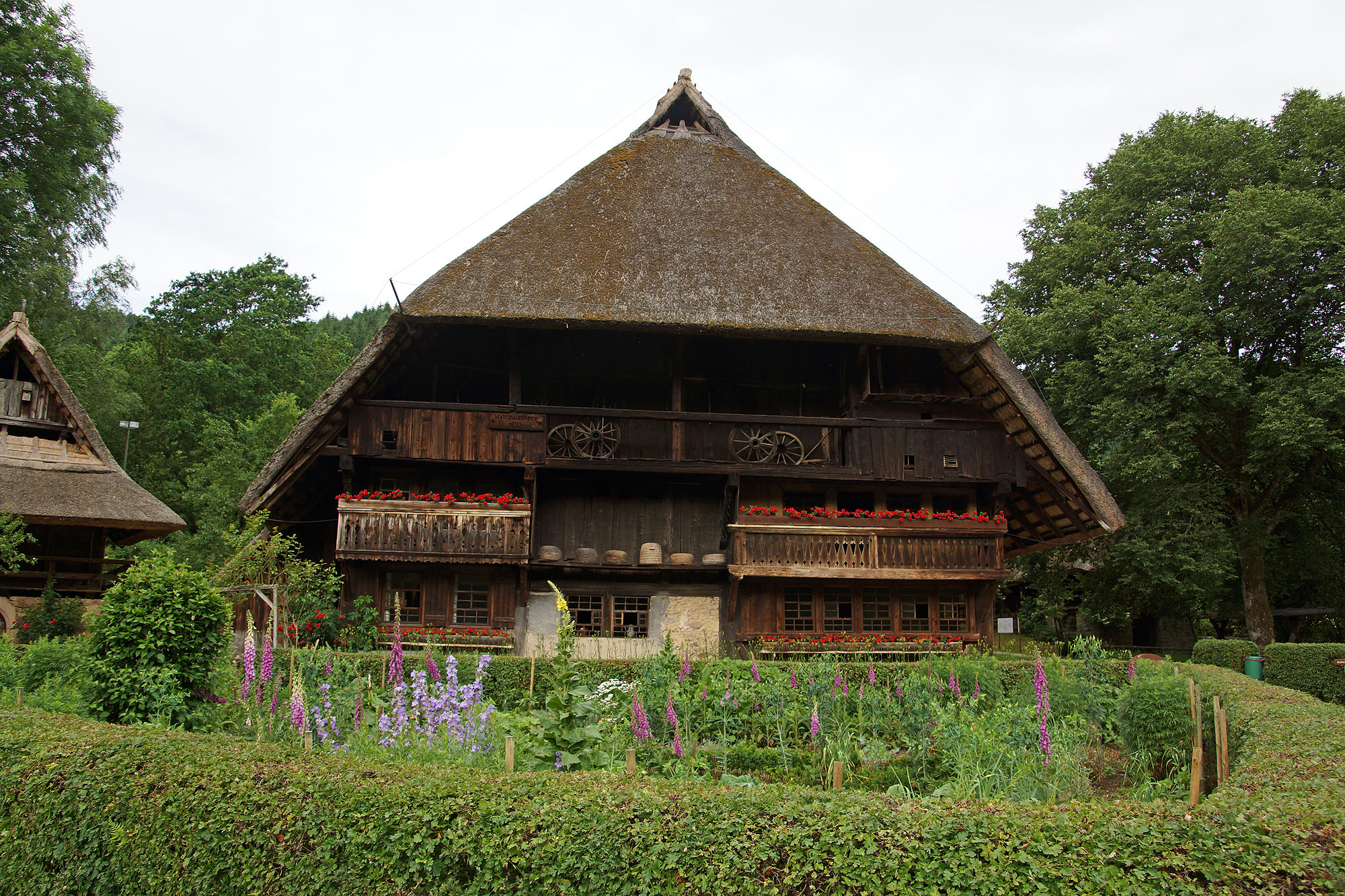
The Vogtsbauernhof from the front
