= Gustav Schönleber =

German painter

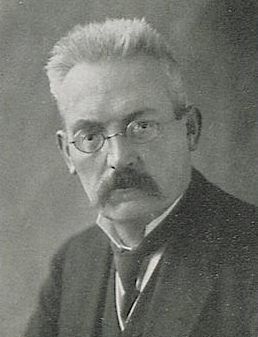
Gustav Schönleber (1914)

Gustav Schönleber (German pronunciation: [ˈɡʊstaf ˈʃøːnˌleːbɐ]; 3 December 1851 in Bietigheim – 1 February 1917 in Karlsruhe) was a German landscape painter.

== Biography ==
His father ran a small industrial plant and he received his primary education in Stuttgart. A childhood accident left him blind in one eye. He originally studied mechanical engineering at the University of Stuttgart, but he drew as a hobby and a cousin, who recognized his talent, suggested that he go to Munich to study at the private art school of Adolf Heinrich Lier. He studied landscape painting there from 1870 to 1873.

In the later 1870s, he travelled extensively; to France, Holland and Italy as well as throughout Germany, providing illustrations for numerous books and other publications. From 1880 to 1917, he taught at the Academy of Fine Arts, Karlsruhe, where his notable students included Friedrich Kallmorgen, Wilhelm Hasemann, Paul Müller-Kaempff, Gerhard Bakenhus, Max Wilhelm Roman and Max Frey. By 1888, he was sufficiently well-off to build his own villa next to the Academy.

In 1895 he, Fritz von Uhde and Max Liebermann were chosen to represent Germany at the first Venice Biennale. In the mid 1900s, he was paid 10,000 Goldmarks by the government of Baden to paint scenes of the Laufenburger Stromschnellen, before they were destroyed to improve navigation and make room for power plant construction.

He also served on the committee that selected artists to design trading cards for the Stollwerck chocolate company of Cologne, and was a member of the Deutscher Künstlerbund. He was awarded the Pour le Mérite for Sciences and Arts in 1911 and, in 1912, received the Order of the Crown from King William II of Württemberg.

== Selected paintings ==
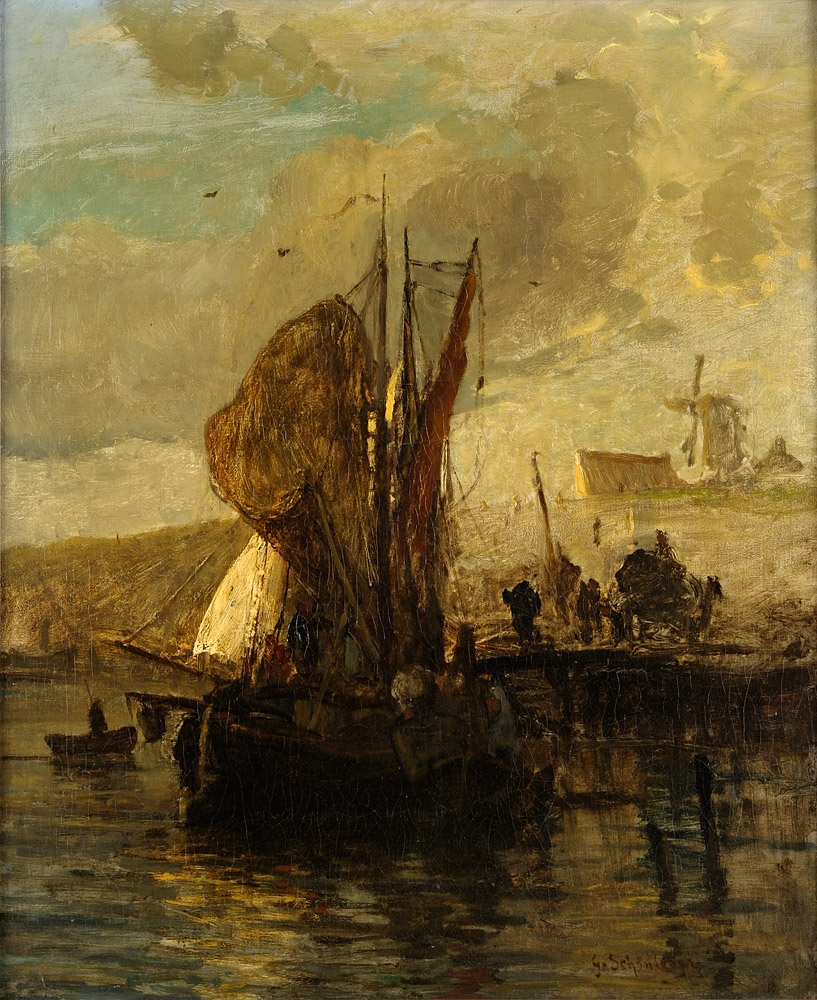
Fishing Port

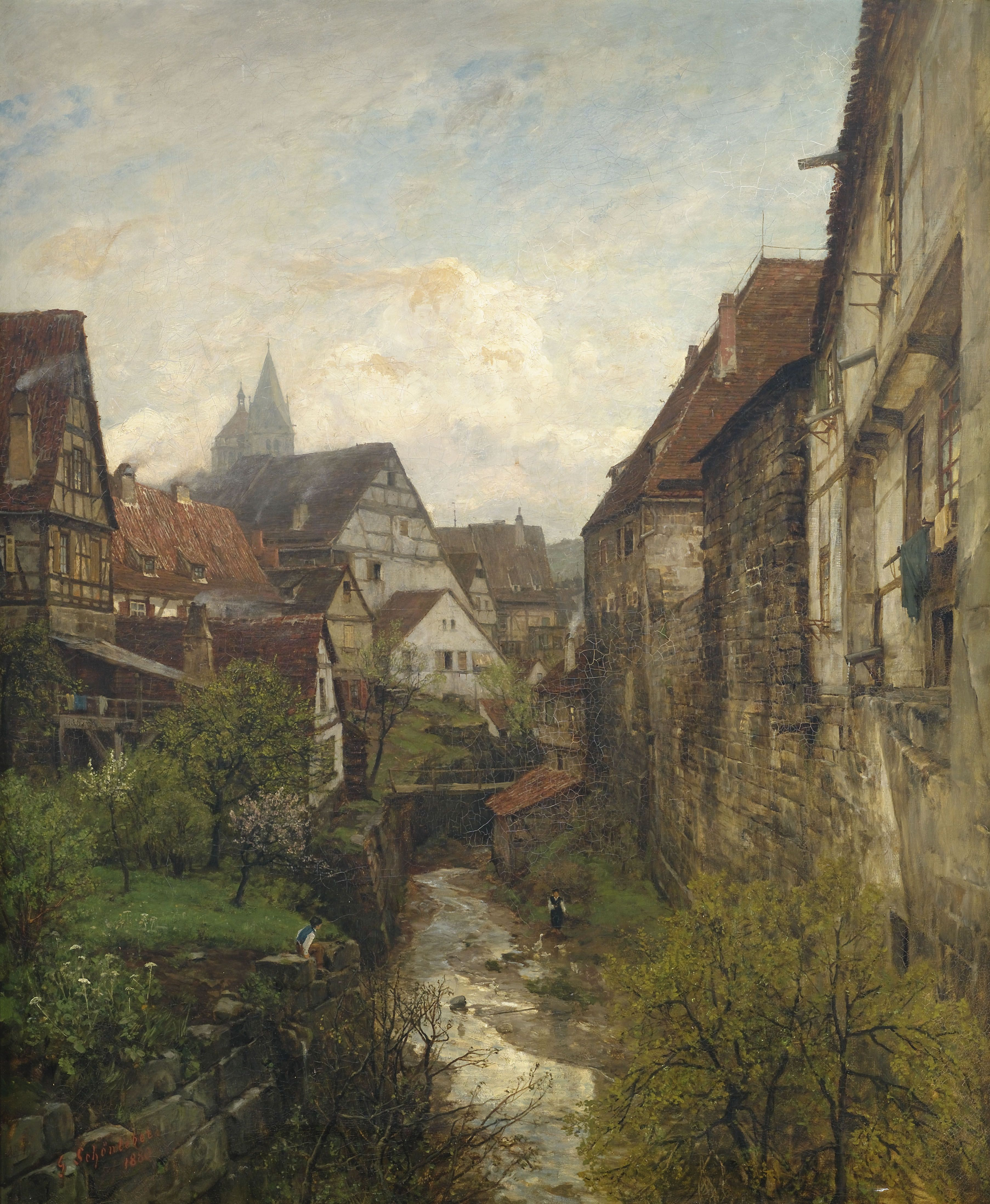
View of the Old Town
in Esslingen

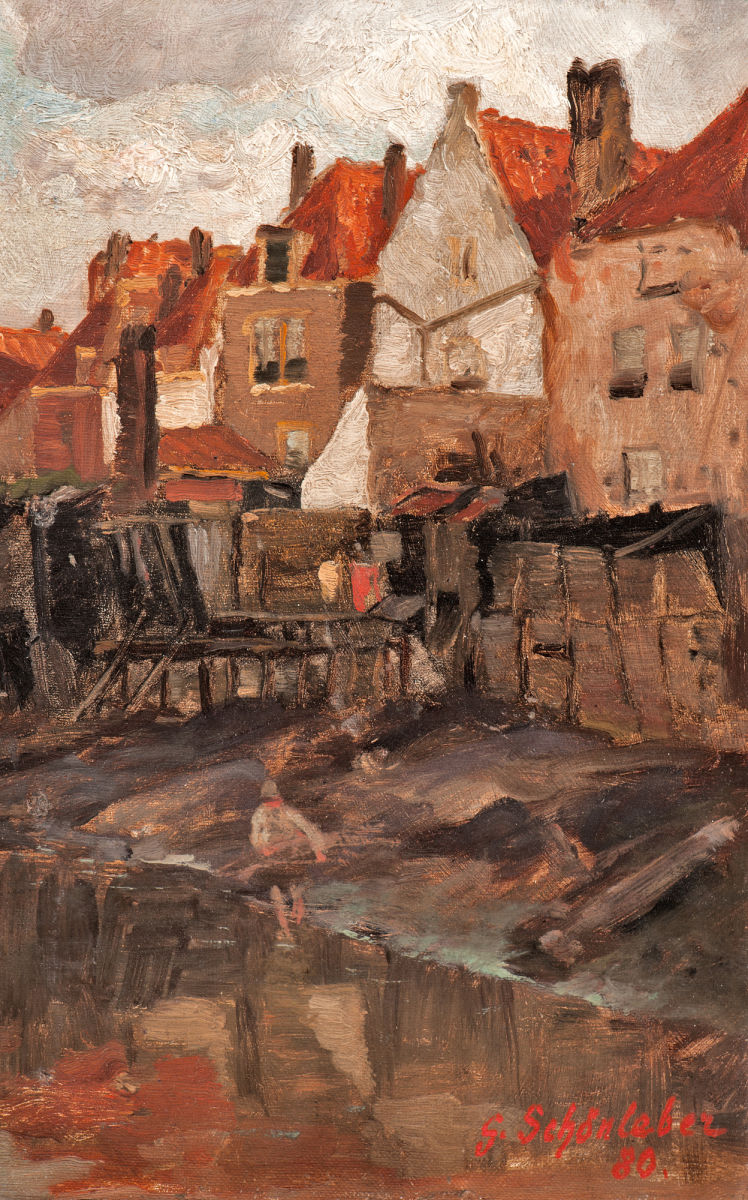
View of Vlissingen

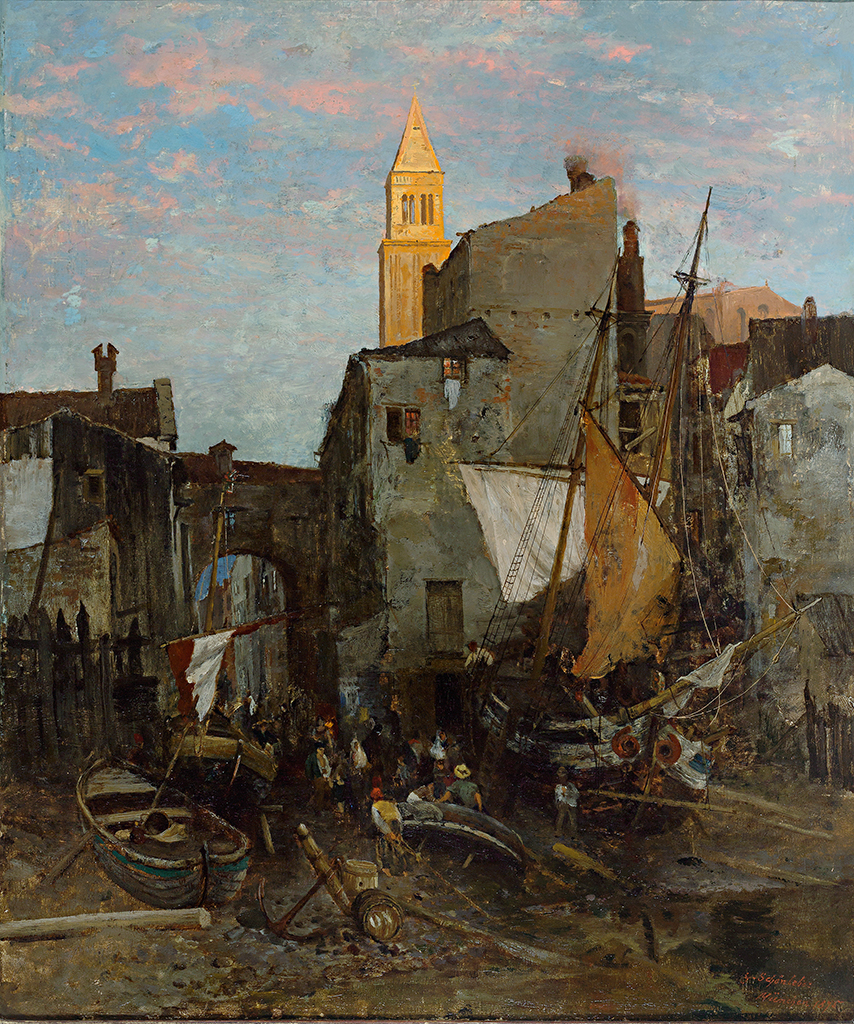
Marina in Venice

== Bibliography ==
Art:

- Schönleber, Gustav. 66 Skizzen in Faksimilenachbildungen (Stuttgart: Stuttgarter Kunstverlag, 1925)
- Schönleber, Gustav. Gustav Schönleber 1851–1917: Gemälde – Zeichnungen (Esslingen am Neckar: Stadt Esslingen, 1980)
- Schönleber, Gustav. Gustav Schönleber (Karlsruhe: Städtische Galerie, 1990)
- von Zügel, Heinrich et al. Ausstellung Heinrich von Zügel, 1850–1941, Gustav Schönleber, 1851–1917, Friedrich Eckenfelder, 1861–1938 (Stuttgart: Kunsthaus Bühler, 2002)

Biography, criticism and art history:

- Miller-Gruber, Renate. Gustav Schönleber 1851–1917: Monographie und Werkverzeichnis (R. Miller-Gruber, 1990)
- Mülfarth, Leo. Kleines Lexikon Karlsruher Maler (Karlsruhe, 1987, ISBN 3-7617-0250-7) pp. 99–101
- Schulte-Wülwer, Ulrich. Künstlerkolonie Ekensund am Nordufer der Flensburger Förde (Heide, 2000) pp. 82–85
- "Schönleber, Gustav, Maler" in Badische Biographien, 2 (1987), pp. 251 f.
