= Wilhelm Hasemann =

German painter

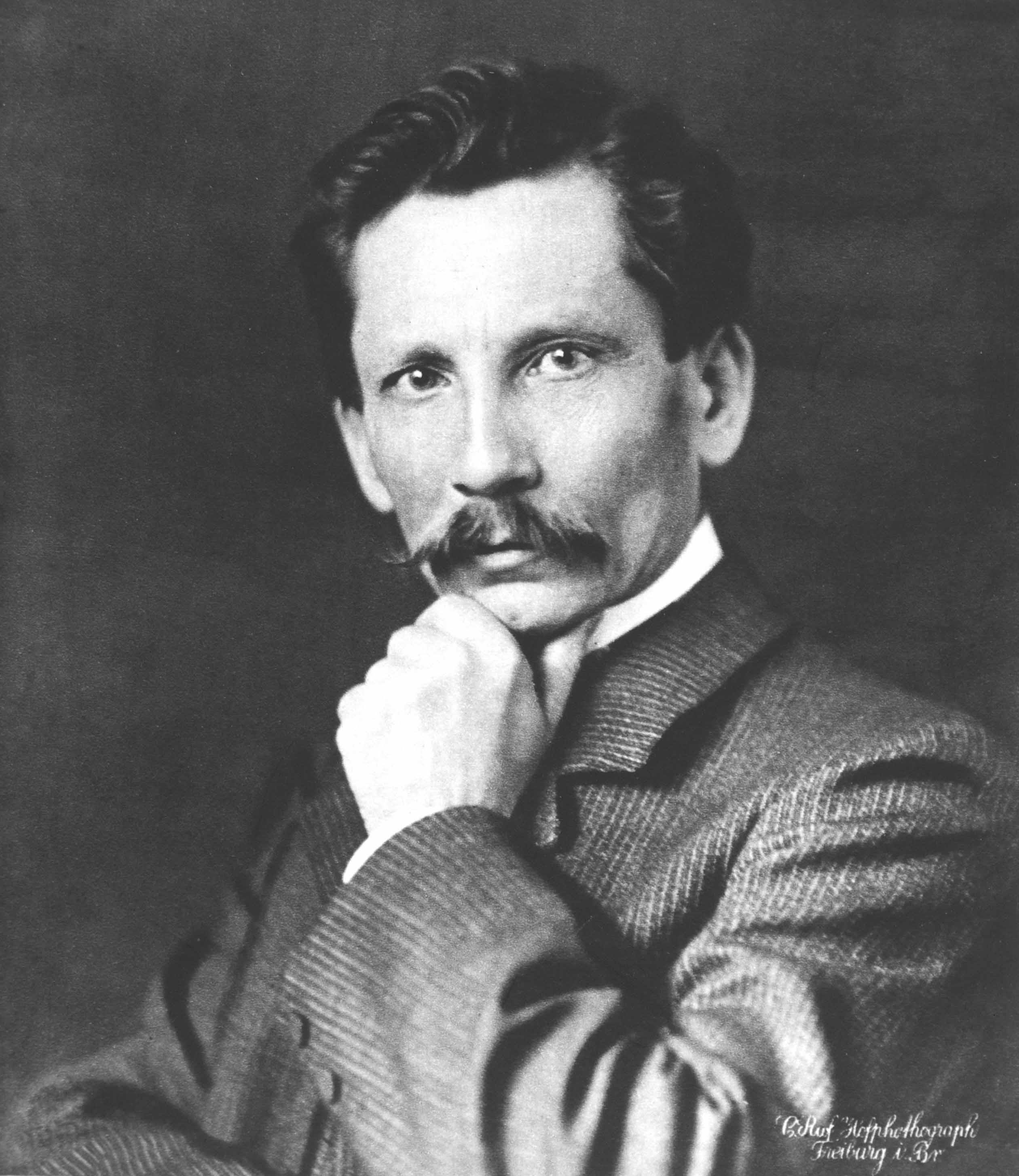
Wilhelm Hasemann (mid 1880s?)

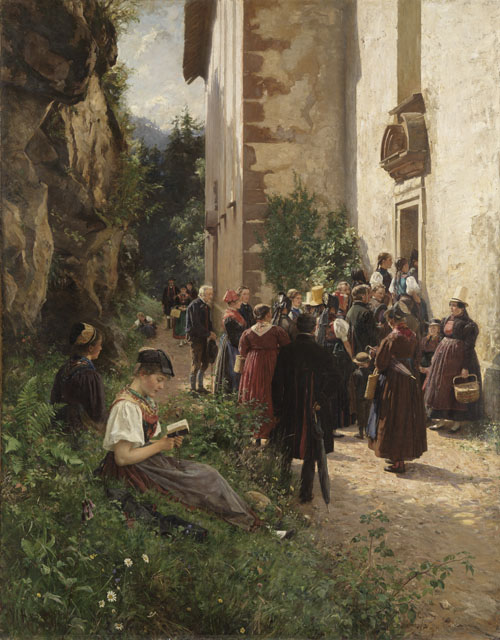
At the Pilgrimage Church in Triberg

Wilhelm Hasemann (16 September 1850 – 28 November 1913) was a German genre painter and illustrator.

== Life and career ==
Hasemann was born in Mühlberg. He was the only son of a mechanic and left school at the age of fifteen to work in his father's shop. After displaying some artistic talent, he went to study at the Prussian Academy of Arts, the Weimar Saxon-Grand Ducal Art School and the Academy of Fine Arts, Karlsruhe where he was a student of Gustav Schönleber. In 1880, he visited the village of Gutach for the first time as part of an assignment to illustrate the novella "Lorle, die Frau Professorin" by Berthold Auerbach. Later, he and his brother-in-law Curt Liebich would establish an artists' colony at Gutach. In 1898, he was named a Professor by Frederick I, Grand Duke of Baden.

Hasemenn's paintings focused on rural life, customs and traditional dress, and his works were widely reproduced as postcards and magazine illustrations. He often collaborated with the writer Heinrich Hansjakob, who lived nearby in Haslach. They shared an interest in preserving the culture of the Black Forest region.

Hasemann died in 1913 in Gutach. The primary and secondary schools in Gutach are named after him, as well as the art museum and the game preserve between Hausach and Schonach. In addition, the mountain hut on the Farrenkopf on the Westweg between Hausach and Schonach bears his name.
