= Gutach (Kinzig) =

River in Germany

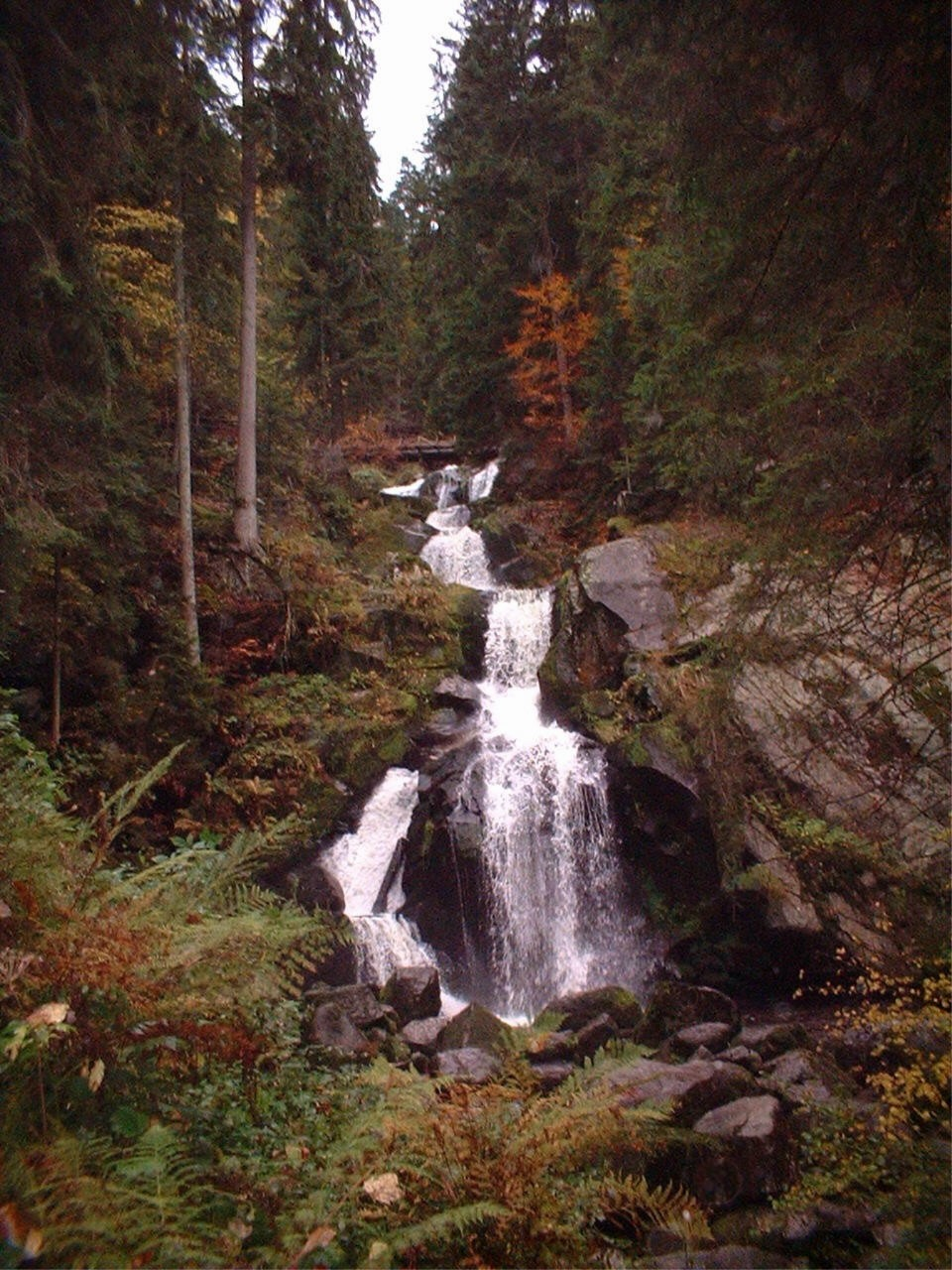

Location
- Country: Germany
- State: Baden-Württemberg

Physical characteristics
- Mouth
  - location: Kinzig
  - coordinates: 48.2850°N 8.1976°E
- Length: 29.3 km (18.2 mi)
- Basin size: 161 km^{2} (62 sq mi)

Basin features
- Progression: Kinzig→ Rhine→ North Sea

Gutach (German pronunciation: [ˈɡuːtax]) is a river of Baden-Württemberg, Germany. It passes through Triberg im Schwarzwald and Gutach (Schwarzwaldbahn), and flows into the Kinzig near Hausach. The Triberg Waterfalls are formed by the Gutach.

== See also ==
- List of rivers of Baden-Württemberg
