= Blindensee =

Raised bog lake in the Black Forest in Germany

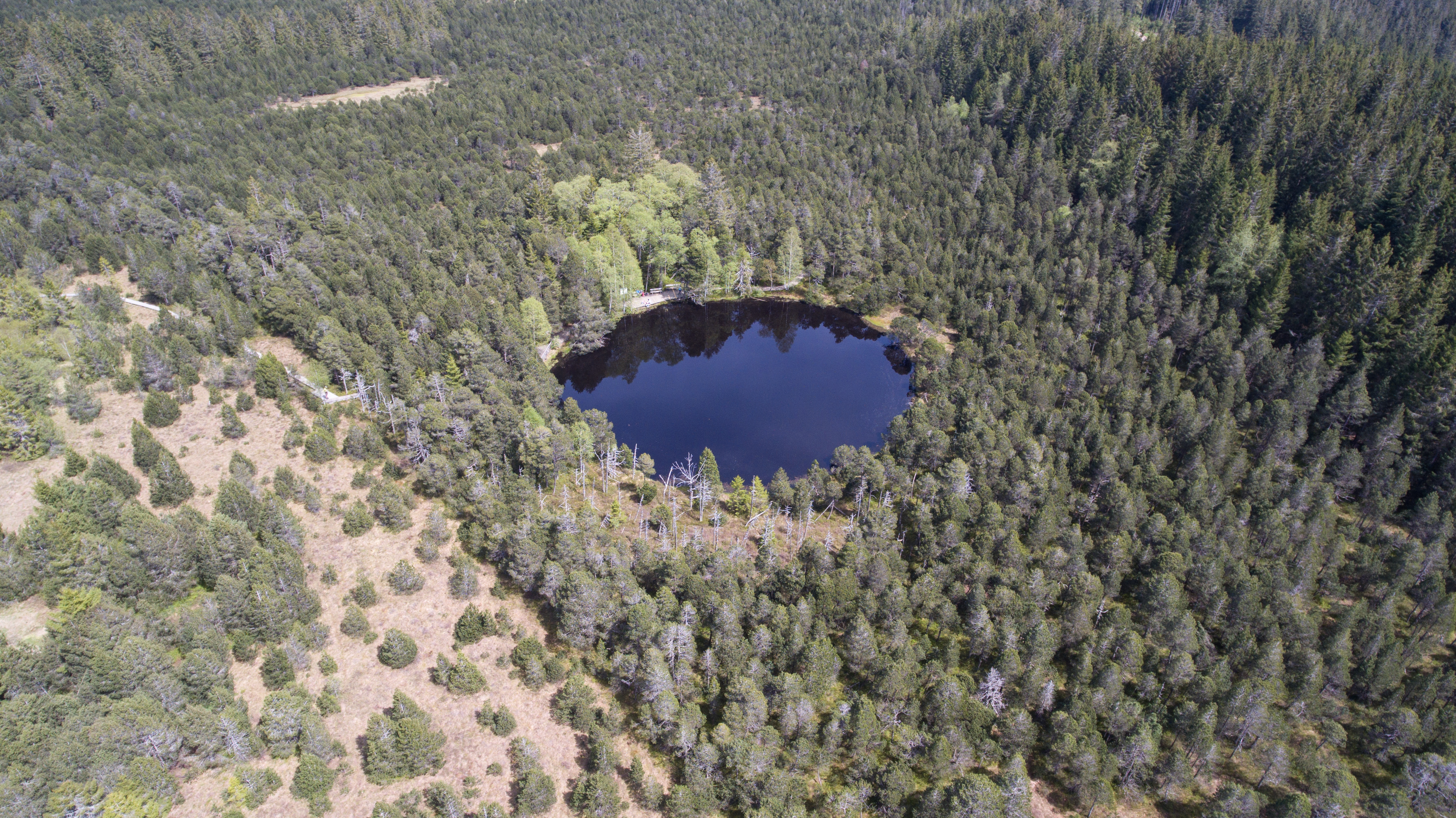
- Aerial photograph of the Blindensee

- Location within Germany
- Location: Baden-Württemberg
- Coordinates: 48°07′27″N 8°10′25″E

The Blindensee is a raised bog lake on the territory of Schönwald im Schwarzwald in the Black Forest in Germany. It lies within the county of Schwarzwald-Baar-Kreis in the state of Baden-Württemberg. It is only accessible on a board walk and lies with raised bog area that has been designated as a nature reserved near the watershed between the rivers Gutach and Elz.

As is typical of raised bog lakes, it has neither a headstream nor a tailstream.

== Nature reserve ==
The Blindensee Nature Reserve (Naturschutzgebiet Blindensee) was established as a Naturschutzgebiet by an act of the Freiburg regional government dated 2 March 1960 (NSG Number 3.056). The reserve has an area of 28.5 hectares. It is part of the 1,722-hectare Special Area of Conservation 7915-341 Schönwald Plateaux.

== Flora ==
In the nutrient-poor raised bog around the lake there are plant species like the hare's-tail cottongrass (Eriophorum vaginatum), the cranberry (Oxycoccus palustris) and the round-leaved sundew (Drosera rotundifolia). In the nutrient-rich perimeter zones grow bogbean (Menyanthes trifoliata), summer pheasant's-eye (Comarum palustre) and Irish marsh orchid (Dactylorhiza majalis). Among the botanical rarities of the reserve is the extremely rare erst Rannoch-rush (Scheuchzeria plaustris).

== Legends ==
A legend, according to which a cow drowned in the Blindensee and resurfaced after several weeks in the Danube, is supposed to have led to an (inevitably fruitless) attempt to identify a link with the Danube, by dying the lake water. According to another tale, a drover is supposed to have drowned in the Blindensee with his entire span of horses, never to be seen again.

== Surrounding area ==
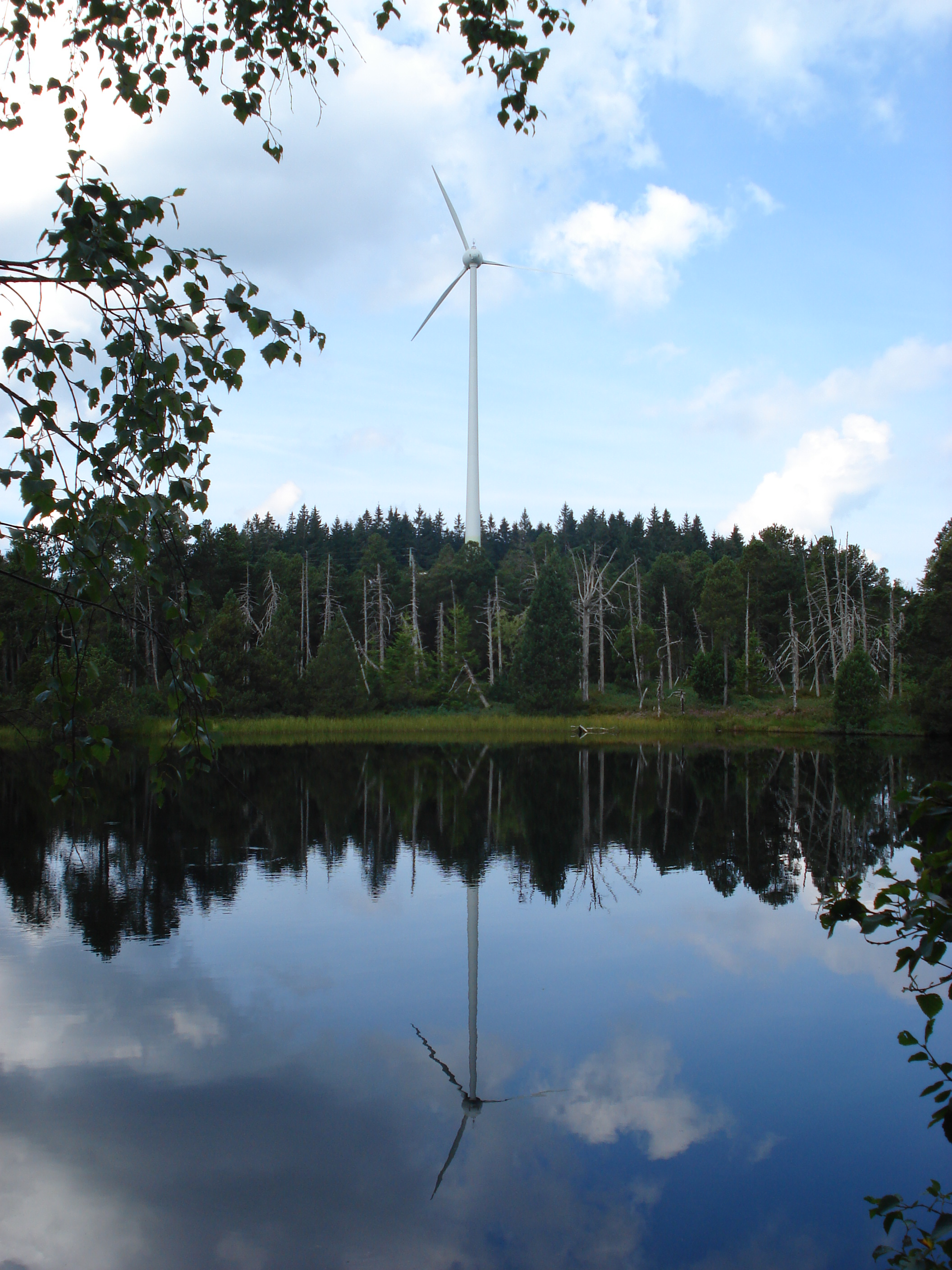
Blindensee and wind turbine

For several years a wind turbine has been sited in the vicinity of the reserve that can be clearly seen from the shores of the Blindensee and may thus be regarded as intrusive. For example, in a 2010 travel guide about the lake it said "mystical mirror, mysterious eye, enchanted gateway to the other world - these were the descriptions that visitors had recently come across. But the famous scenery has been destroyed: a gigantic windmill rises over the lake and drives away every peaceful moment with the noise of its whirring rotor blades."

== Literature ==
- Bezirksstelle für Naturschutz und Landschaftspflege Freiburg (2004). Die Naturschutzgebiete im Regierungsbezirk Freiburg [The nature reserves in the administrative district of Freiburg] (2nd, rev. and exp. ed.). Ostfildern: Thorbecke. pp. 530–533. ISBN 978-3-7995-5174-8.
