= Dobel =

German municipality

- Municipality
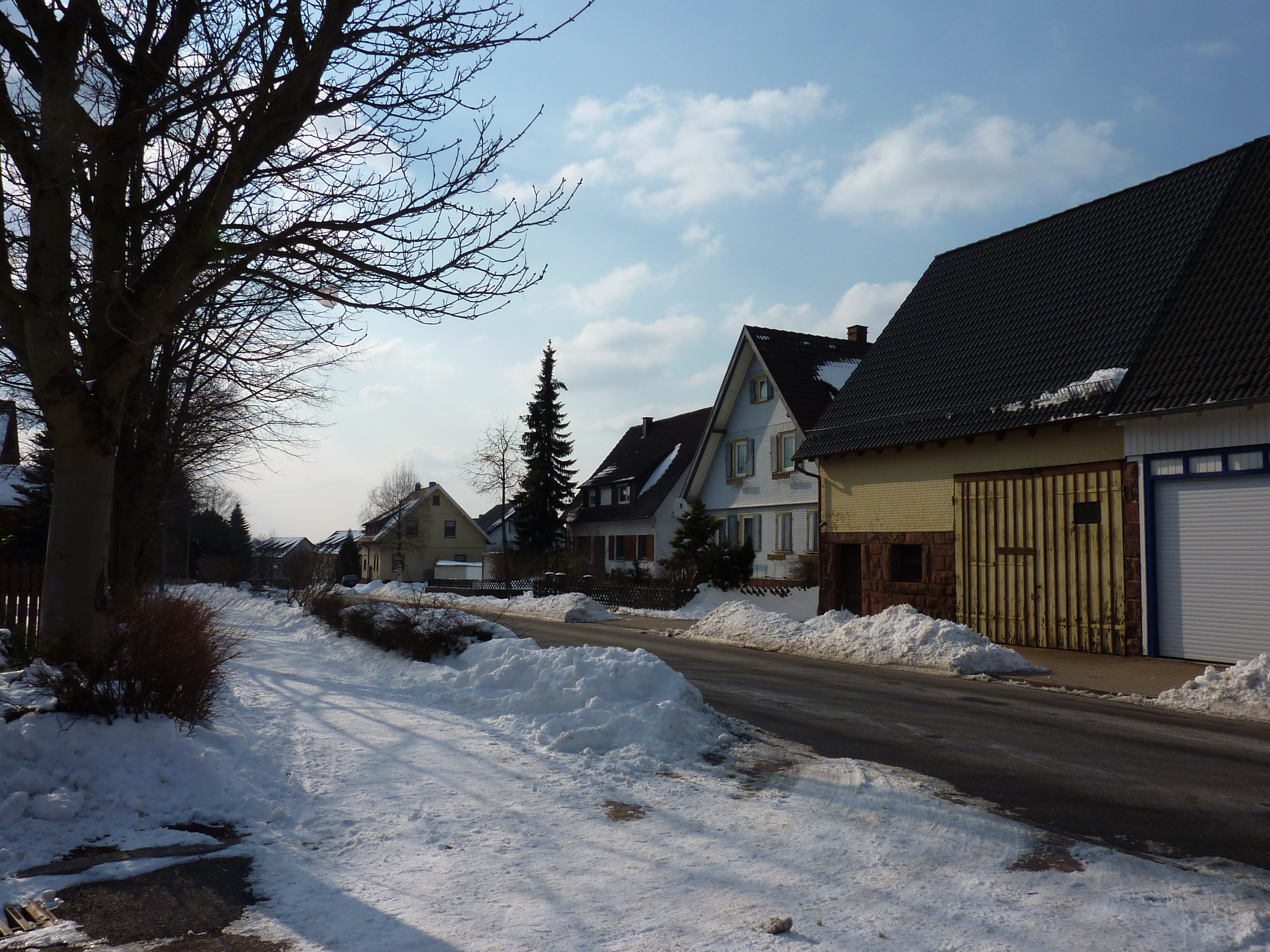

- Coat of arms

- Location of Dobel within Calw district
- Interactive map of Dobel
- Location within Germany Location within Baden-Württemberg
- Coordinates: 48°47′53″N 8°29′40″E
- Country: Germany
- State: Baden-Württemberg
- Admin. region: Karlsruhe
- District: Calw

Government
  - Mayor (2022–30): Christoph Schaack (CDU)

Area
  - Total: 18.41 km^{2} (7.11 sq mi)
- Elevation: 689 m (2,260 ft)

Population (2025-12-31)
  - Total: 2,253
  - Density: 122.4/km^{2} (317.0/sq mi)
- Time zone: UTC+01:00 (CET)
  - Summer (DST): UTC+02:00 (CEST)
- Postal codes: 75335
- Dialling codes: 07083
- Vehicle registration: CW
- Website: www.dobel.de

Dobel (German pronunciation: [ˈdoːbl̩]) is a municipality in the district of Calw in Baden-Württemberg in Germany.

== History ==
Dobel became a possession of the Duchy of Württemberg in 1527 after purchasing rights to the town over the last two hundred years, and it was assigned to the district of Neuenbürg. That district was dissolved in 1938 and Dobel was reassigned to district of Calw. The town began a period of urban growth after World War II, particularly along its eastern edge. In the 1970s, there was some expansion further to the northeast, and the village of Lehensägmühle was ceded to Dobel from Bad Wildbad in 1971. Dobel became a health resort in 1984 and gained a clinic in 1987.

== Geography ==
The municipality (Gemeinde) of Dobel is located situated in the district of Calw, in the German state of Baden-Württemberg. Dobel lies at the northwest corner of the district, bordering the districts of Rastatt and the Enz. The municipal area is physically located in the Grinde area of the Black Forest, on a plateau between the valleys of the Enz and Alb rivers. Elevation above sea level in the municipal area ranges from a high of 882 meters (2,894 ft) Normalnull (NN) at the top of the Rosskopf to a low of 405 meters (1,329 ft) NN.

A portion of the Federally protected Eyach and Rotenbach valleys nature reserve is located in Dobel's municipal area.

== Politics ==
Dobel has one borough (Ortseil), Dobel, and two villages: Eyachmühle and Lehensägmühle. Dobel is in a municipal association with Bad Herrenalb.

=== Coat of arms ===
Dobel's coat of arms shows the sun rising behind a green, three-pointed hill upon a field of blue. This pattern was created in 1939 and refers to the landscape of Dobel. The coat of arms was approved, and a municipal flag issued, by the Federal Ministry of the Interior on 25 January 1968.

== Transportation ==
Dobel is connected to Germany's network of roadways by its local Landesstraßen und Kreisstraßen. Local public transportation is provided by the Verkehrsgesellschaft Bäderkreis Calw.
