= Husen Castle (Hausach) =

- Castrum Husen
- Hausach
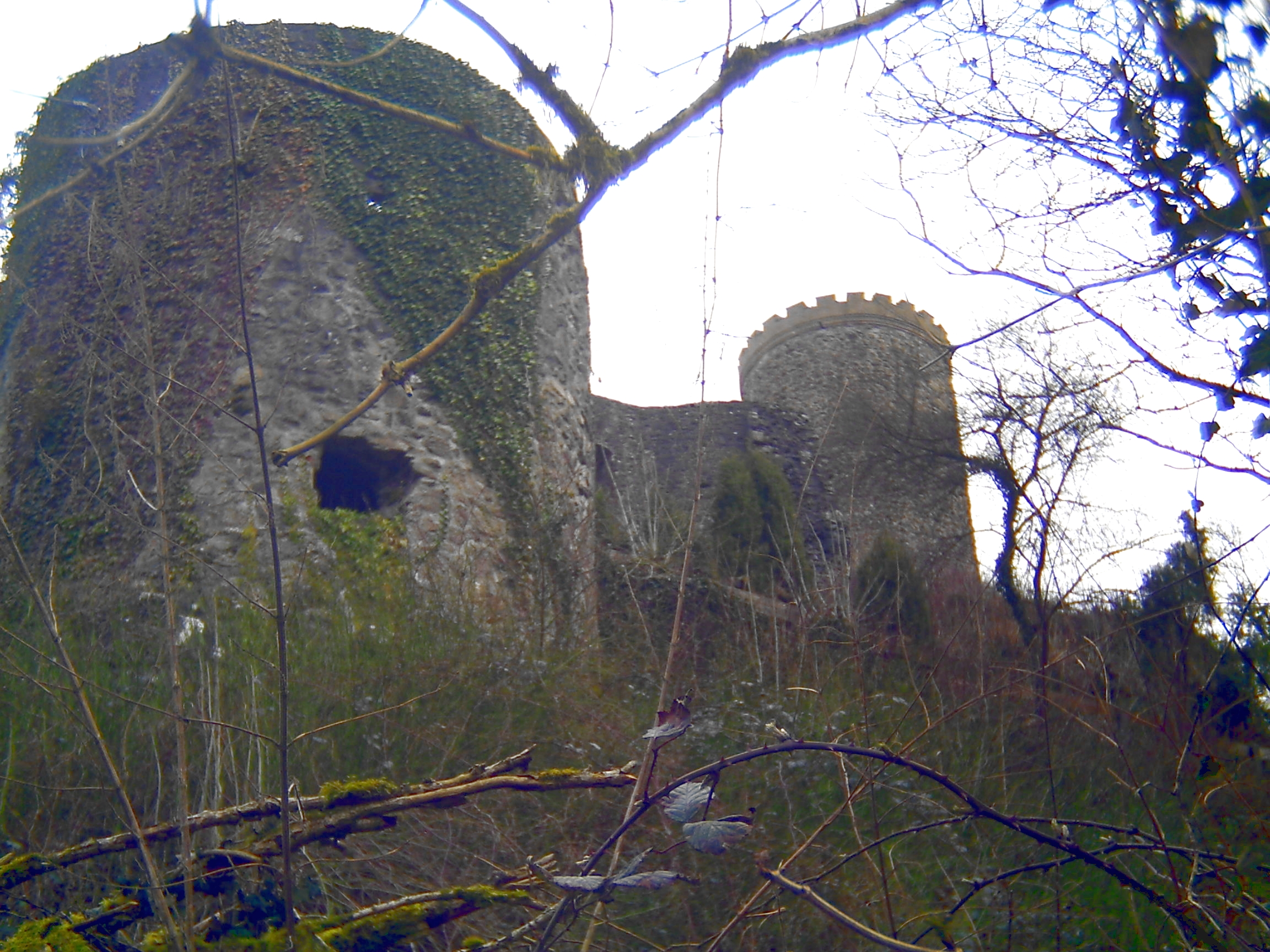
- Husen in February 2008, seen from the west

Site information
- Type: hill castle
- Code: DE-BW
- Condition: ruin

Location
- Coordinates: 48°16′59″N 8°10′04″E

Site history
- Built: 1246

Garrison information
- Occupants: counts

Husen Castle (German: Burg Husen) is a ruined hill castle of the high medieval period in the valley of the Kinzig in the Black Forest. It is sited above the town of Hausach in the county of Ortenaukreis in the German state of Baden-Württemberg.

== History ==
The original hill castle, recorded for the first time in 1246 as castrum Husen, was probably built here by the dukes of Zähringen in the 12th century. It later went into the possession of the counts of Freiburg. In 1303, the castle went to the counts of Fürstenberg as a result of the marriage of Verena of Freiburg.

Count Henry IV of Fürstenberg had the castle extensively remodelled and expanded from 1453 to 1477. A neck ditch and an outer ward guarded the heart of the castle with its palas and bergfried.

The castle was the residence of the prince's castellans (Burgvögte). In 1632 it burned down and was rebuilt. In 1643 French-Weimar troops under Jean Baptiste Budes de Guébriant destroyed the castle.

Later the ruins were incorporated into fortified earthworks or schanzen in order to defend the valley against enemy troops. In 1896 the bergfried was given battlements instead of the tower’s conical roof. In 1968 the town of Hausach purchased the ruins from the House of Fürstenberg. Today, parts of the palas wall, the so-called battery tower and the bergfried survive.

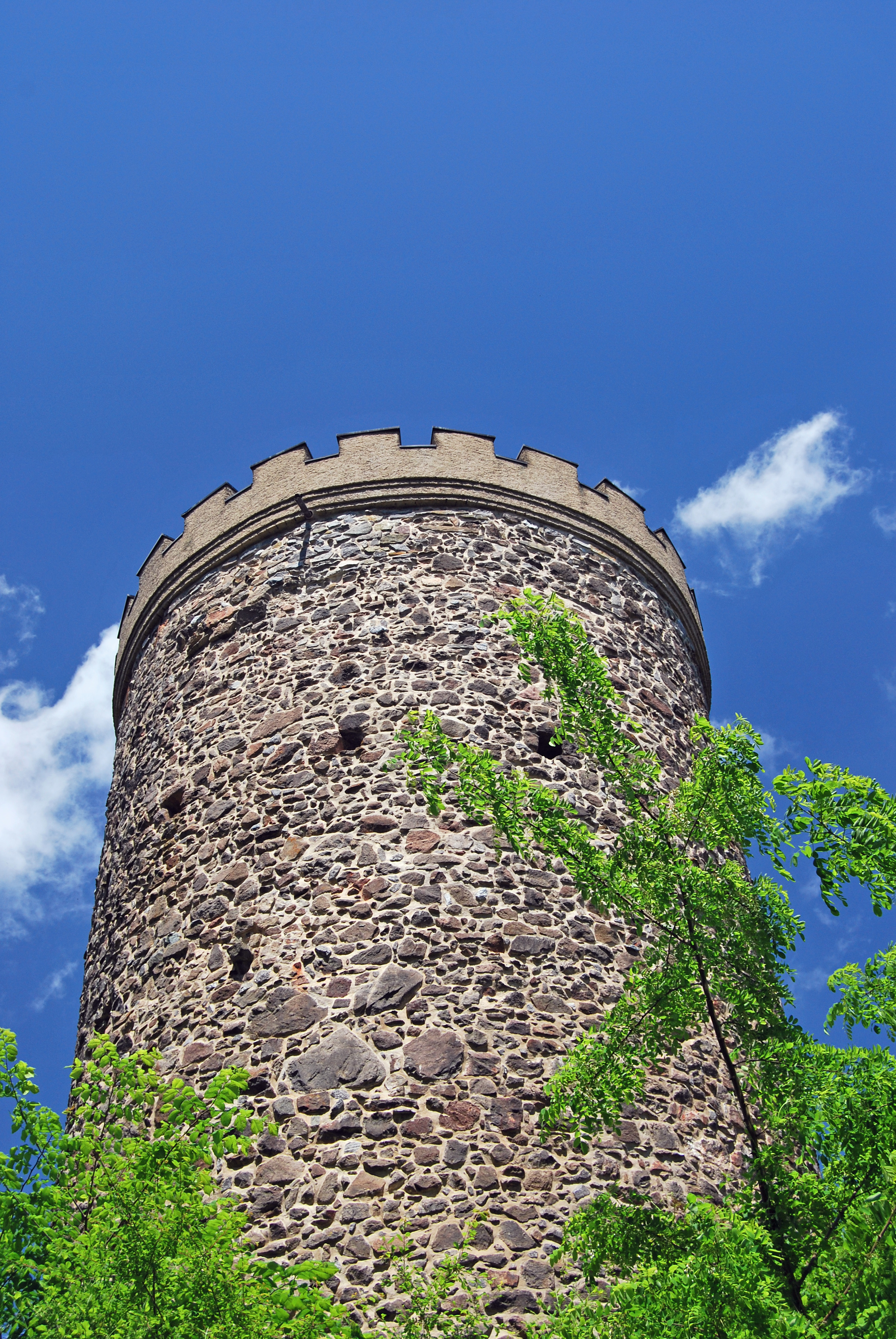
The bergfried (May 2009)

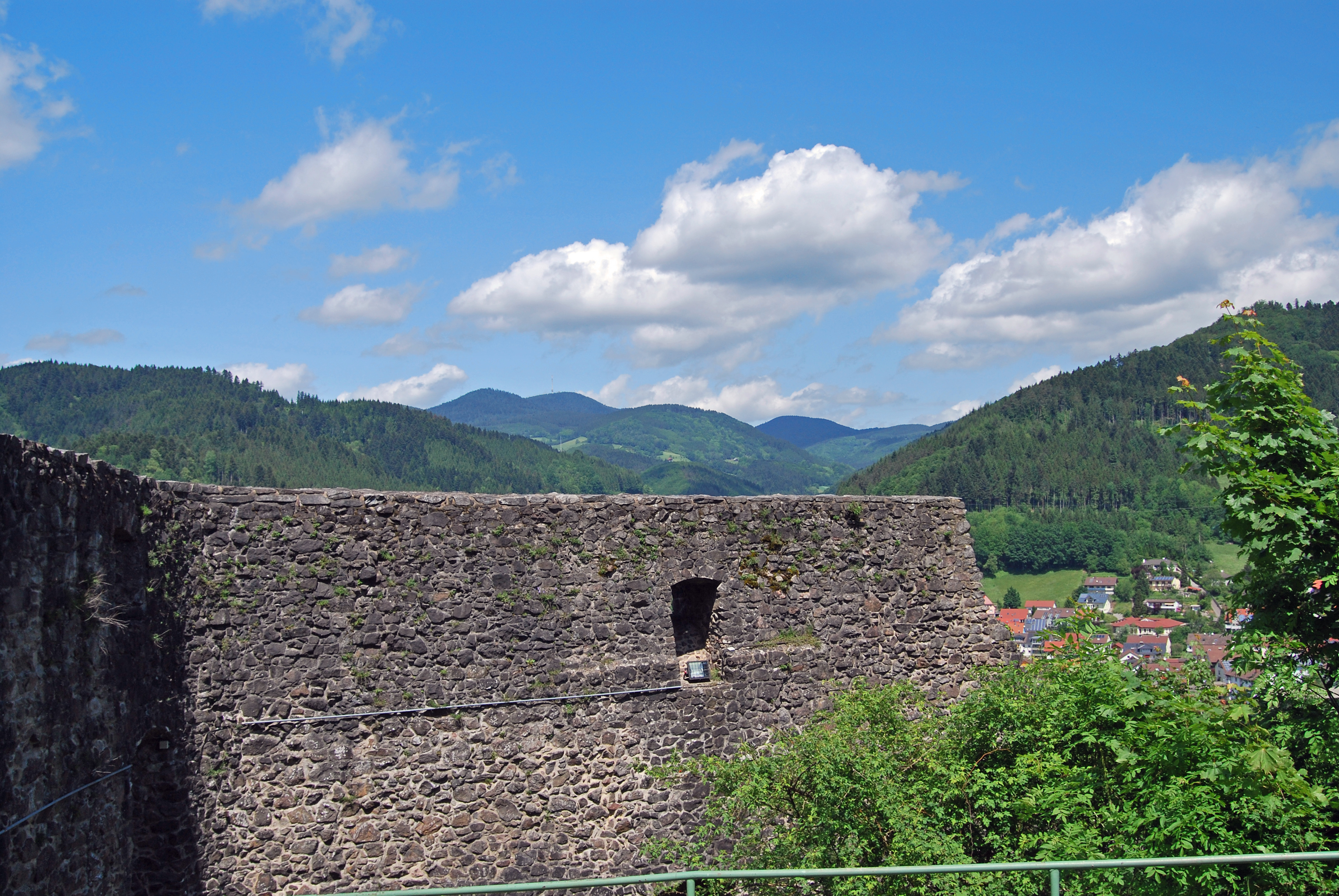

== Literature ==
- Kurt Klein: Burgen, Schlösser und Ruinen - Zeugen der Vergangenheit im Ortenaukreis. Reiff Black Forestverlag, Offenburg, 1997, ISBN 3-922663-47-8, pp. 32–33.
