= Rottweil–Lahr Black Forest Trail =

Hiking route in Germany

Rottweil-Lahr Black Forest Trail
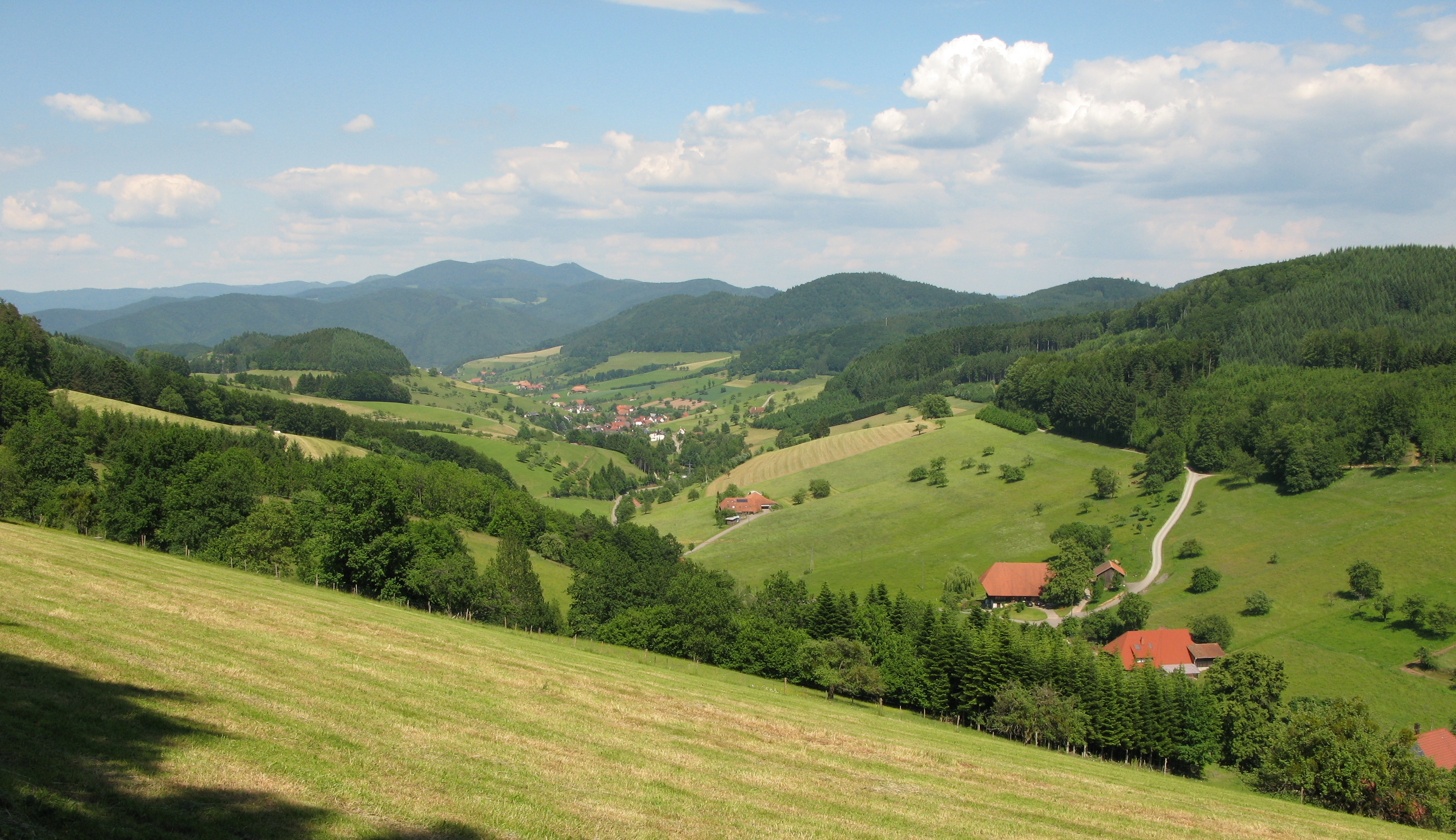
- View of Welschensteinach above the Kinzig valley
- Length: 99 km
- Location: Germany, Baden-Württemberg, Black Forest
- Trailheads: Rottweil; Lahr
- Use: long distance trail
- Highest point: Hochwälder Höhe (960 m)
- Lowest point: Lahr Bus Station (171 m)
- Difficulty: easy/medium
- Season: spring to autumn
- Months: March–October
- Waymark: red and blue diamond on a yellow background
- Sights: Huberfelsen
- Maintainer: Black Forest Club

The Rottweil–Lahr Black Forest Trail (German: Schwarzwald-Querweg Rottweil–Lahr) is a four-day hiking route through the Black Forest in Germany from Rottweil to Lahr. The 99-kilometre-long hiking trail was laid out in 1935 and has been sponsored and maintained since then by the Black Forest Club. Its waymark is a red and blue diamond on a yellow background. Usually the blue side points to Rottweil and the red side to Lahr.

== Short description ==
The Rottweil–Lahr trail leaves the Neckar valley to run initially over open countryside with views of the heights of the Central Black Forest. On the second day, the path runs from Königsfeld through woods down to Hornberg in the Gutach valley. After a steep climb to the watershed between the Kinzig and Elz on the third day, the fourth day's journey leads into the Schutter valley to Lahr.
