= Gutach (Schwarzwaldbahn) =

- Municipality
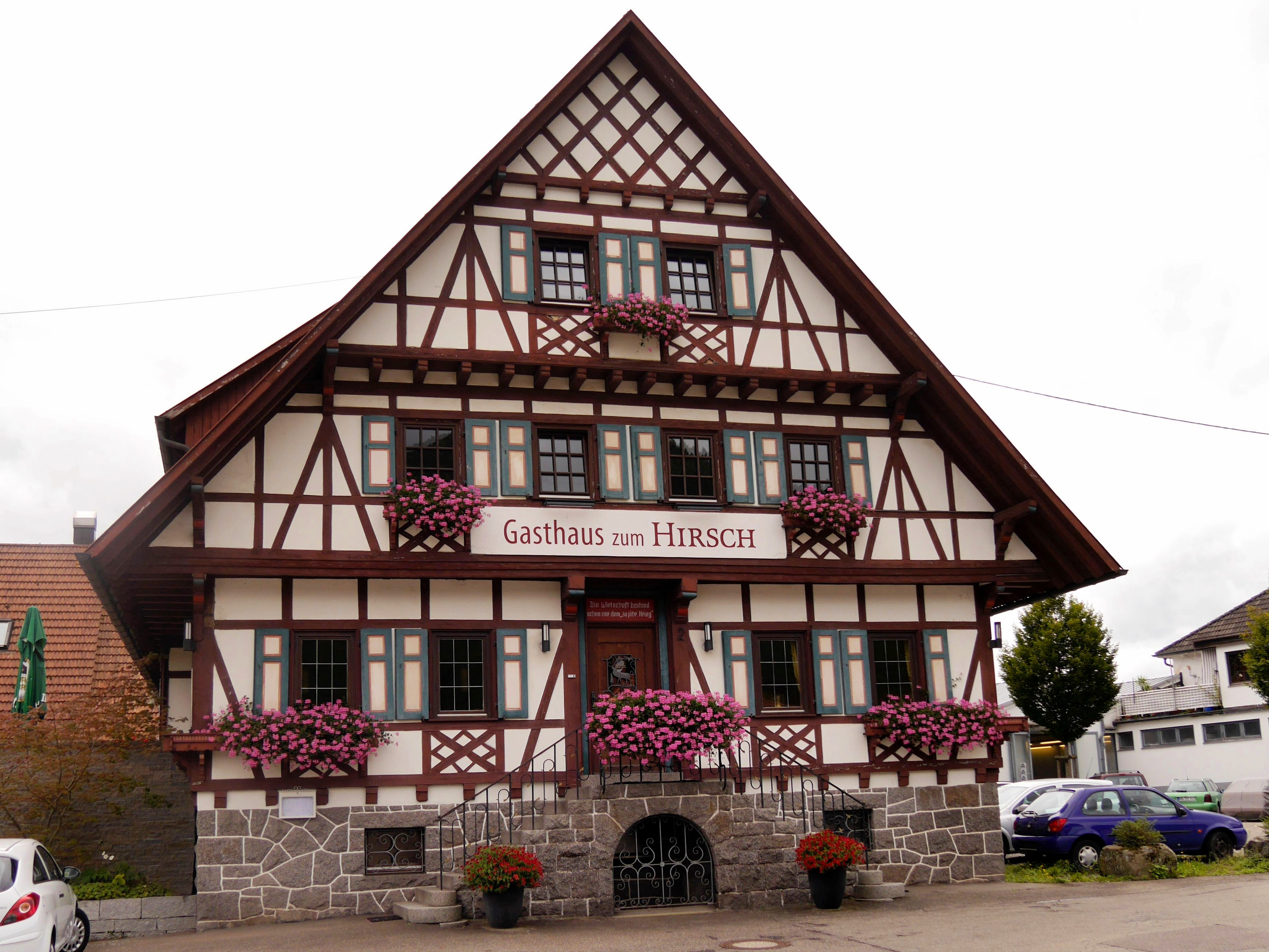
- Gutach, September 2017

- Coat of arms

- Location of Gutach (Schwarzwaldbahn) within Ortenaukreis district
- Interactive map of Gutach (Schwarzwaldbahn)
- Location within Germany Location within Baden-Württemberg
- Coordinates: 48°14′55″N 08°12′42″E
- Country: Germany
- State: Baden-Württemberg
- Admin. region: Freiburg
- District: Ortenaukreis

Government
  - Mayor (2018–26): Siegfried Eckert

Area
  - Total: 31.74 km^{2} (12.25 sq mi)
- Elevation: 294 m (965 ft)

Population (2025-12-31)
  - Total: 2,268
  - Density: 71.46/km^{2} (185.1/sq mi)
- Time zone: UTC+01:00 (CET)
  - Summer (DST): UTC+02:00 (CEST)
- Postal codes: 77793
- Dialling codes: 07833, 07831
- Vehicle registration: OG, BH, KEL, LR, WOL
- Website: www.gutach-schwarzwald.de

Gutach (Schwarzwaldbahn) (German pronunciation: [ˈɡuːtax]; Low Alemannic: Guedä) is a municipality in the district of Ortenau in Baden-Württemberg in Germany.

The borough is home to the Black Forest Open-Air Museum.

== Sons and daughters of the community ==
- Anton Joos (1900-1999), communist functionary

== Other personalities ==
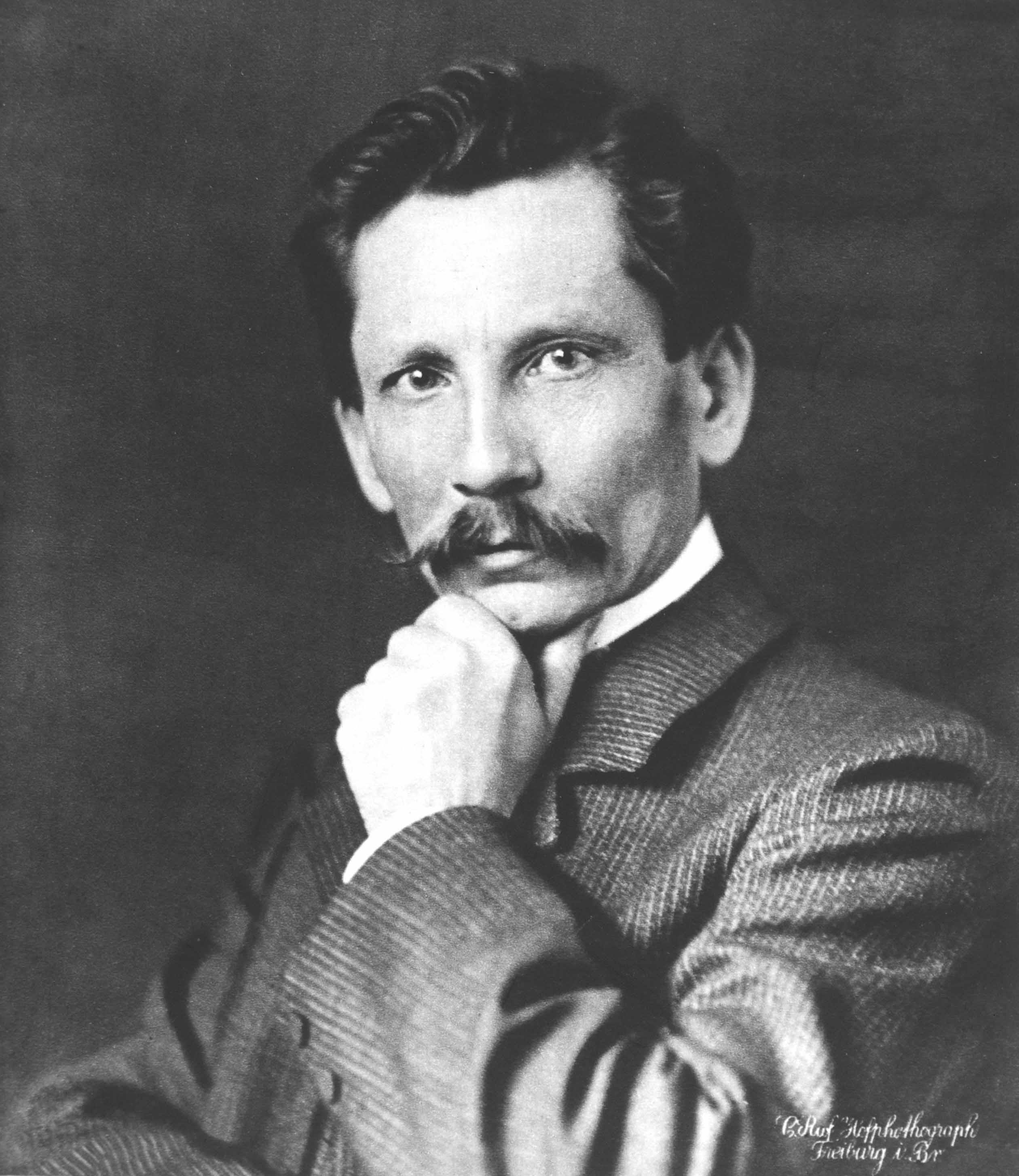
Wilhelm Hasemann

- Wilhelm Hasemann (1850-1913), painter – worked and died in Gutach
- Max Ludwig (1873-1940), writer, painter and graphic artist – lived temporarily in Gutach
