= Hausach =

German city

- City
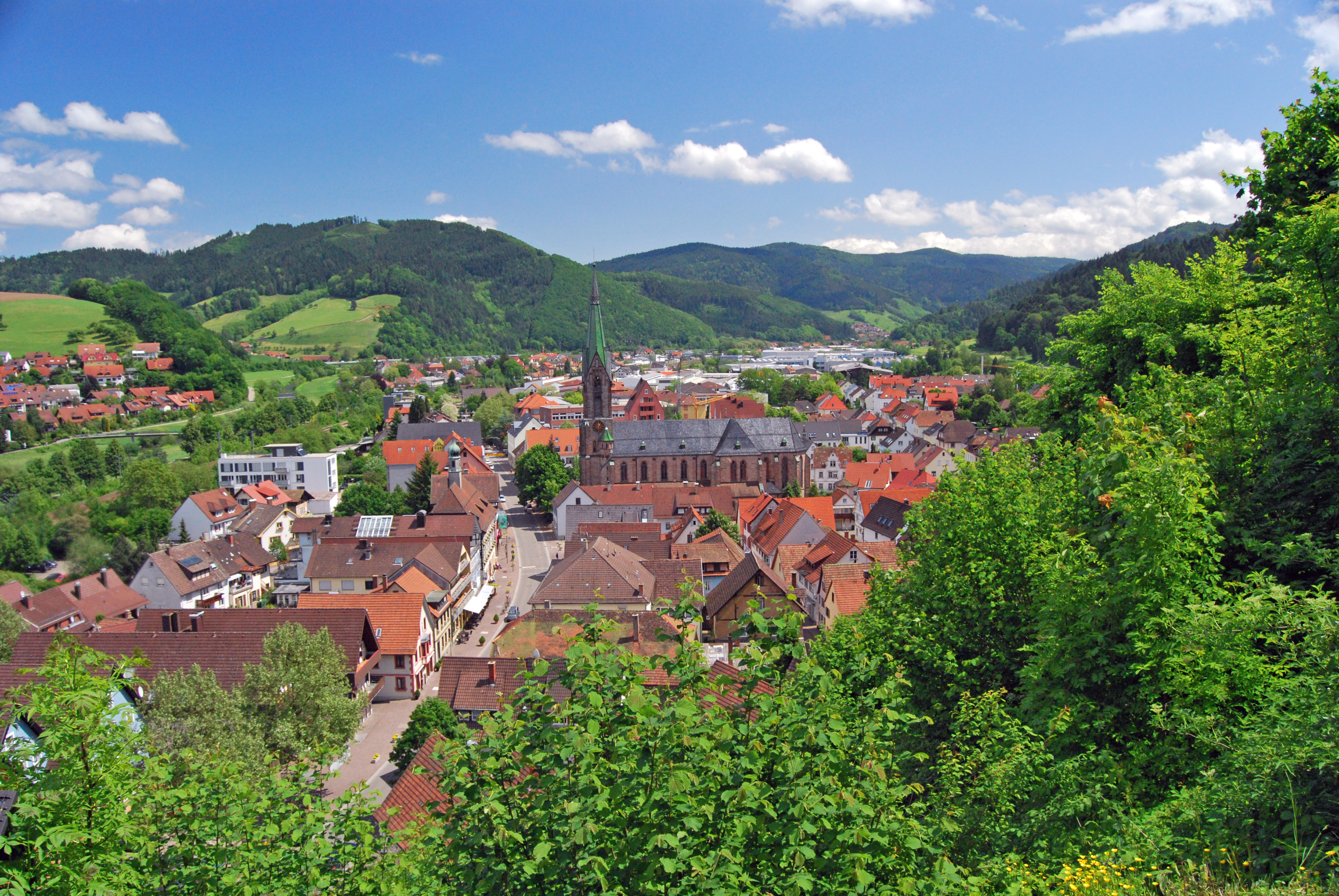

- Coat of arms

- Location of Hausach within Ortenaukreis district
- Interactive map of Hausach
- Location within Germany Location within Baden-Württemberg
- Coordinates: 48°17′07″N 08°10′47″E
- Country: Germany
- State: Baden-Württemberg
- Admin. region: Freiburg
- District: Ortenaukreis

Area
  - Total: 36.07 km^{2} (13.93 sq mi)
- Elevation: 238 m (781 ft)

Population (2025-12-31)
  - Total: 5,815
  - Density: 161.2/km^{2} (417.5/sq mi)
- Time zone: UTC+01:00 (CET)
  - Summer (DST): UTC+02:00 (CEST)
- Postal codes: 77756
- Dialling codes: 07831
- Vehicle registration: OG, BH, KEL, LR, WOL
- Website: www.hausach.de

Hausach (German: [ˈhaʊzax]; Low Alemannic: Huusä) is a city in the Ortenaukreis, in western Baden-Württemberg, Germany.

== History ==
Hausach was founded in the 13th century, below Husen Castle. In the 14th century, it became a possession of the County of Fürstenberg, who gave the town its charter and maintained a residence in it. In 1806, Hausach was mediatized to the Grand Duchy of Baden. The town was assigned in 1813 to the district of Haslach, but in 1857 was reassigned to the district of Wolfach. In 1939, that district was reorganized as Landkreis Wolfach. On 1 Jul 1971, the town of Einbach was incorporated into Hausach. As a result of the 1973 Baden-Württemberg district reform, Hausach was assigned to the Ortenau district.

== Geography ==
The township (Stadt) of Hausach is part of the Ortenau district of Baden-Württemberg, in the Federal Republic of Germany. It is physically located in the Central Black Forest, at the center of the valley of the Kinzig. The elevation above sea level in the municipal area ranges from a high of 945 meters (3,100 ft) Normalnull (NN) at the Brandenkopf to a low of 221 meters (725 ft) NN along the Kinzig.

== Politics ==
Hausach has two boroughs (Stadtteile): Hausach and Einbach.

The town council has 18 seats with a municipal election being held every 5 years.

Party	2014	2019	2024
CDU	6 seats	6 seats	5 seats
SPD	4 seats	3 seats	3 seats
FW	6 seats	6 seats	8 seats
Greens	2 seats	3 seats	2 seats

Hausach twinned with Arbois, France in 1974. The 45th anniversary of that twinning was celebrated by a visit of 37 German functionaries to Arbois on 15 October 2019.

=== Mayor ===
The mayor of Hausach is Wolfgang Hermann, who was elected in 2017.

Term	Mayor	Notes
1811–1823	Severin Wernhöre	
1823–1827	Joachim Sattler	
1849	Rudolf Streit	Named "Mayor of the Revolutionaries" from May to July 1849
1827–1856	Johann Georg Waidele	
1856-1865	Josef Buchholz	
1865–1870	Hermann Becherer	
1870–1882	Constantin Schmid	
1882–1888	Valentin Dorner	
1888–1903	Johann Nepomuk Hämmerle	
1903–1917	Gustav Adolf Rist	
1917–1918	Fidel Renner	
1919–1933	Karl Moog	
1933–1934	Emil Wimmer	
1934–1935	Alfred Haas	
1935–1945	Fritz Kölmel	
1945	Josef Jäckle	Named "emergency mayor" after World War Two
1945–1946	Paul Rist	
1945–1946	Otto Heizmann	
1946–1969	Eugen Heizmann	
1969–1993	Manfred Kienzle	
1993–2001	Gerhard Scharf	
2001–2017	Manfred Wöhrle	
Since 2017	Wolfgang Hermann	

=== Coat of Arms ===
Hausach's coat of arms displays half-timber framework of a gable in red on a field of white. The oldest town seals used in Hausach, dating back to 1453, used a house of timber, then stone, and then from 1655 of a half-timber design. This last symbol became the one permanently associated with Hausach by 1771.

== Demographics ==
As of mid-2023, Hausach had a population of 5,800. 865 of these people (~1.5%) were foreigners while the other 4,935 were German.

Population of Hausach from 1800 to 2023
Year	1800	1900	1925	1970	1972	2011	2012	2013	2014	2015	2016	2017	2019	2020	2021	2022	2023
Population	800	1,665	2,227	4,450	5,182	5,815	5,779	5,746	5,715	5,746	5,809	5,768	5,775	5,759	5,737	5,788	5,800

== Transportation ==
Hausach is served by the Kinzig Valley Railway and the Black Forest Railway and is connected to Germany's network of Federal highways by Bundesstraße 33.
