= Hansjakob Way II =

Hiking trail in the Central Black Forest

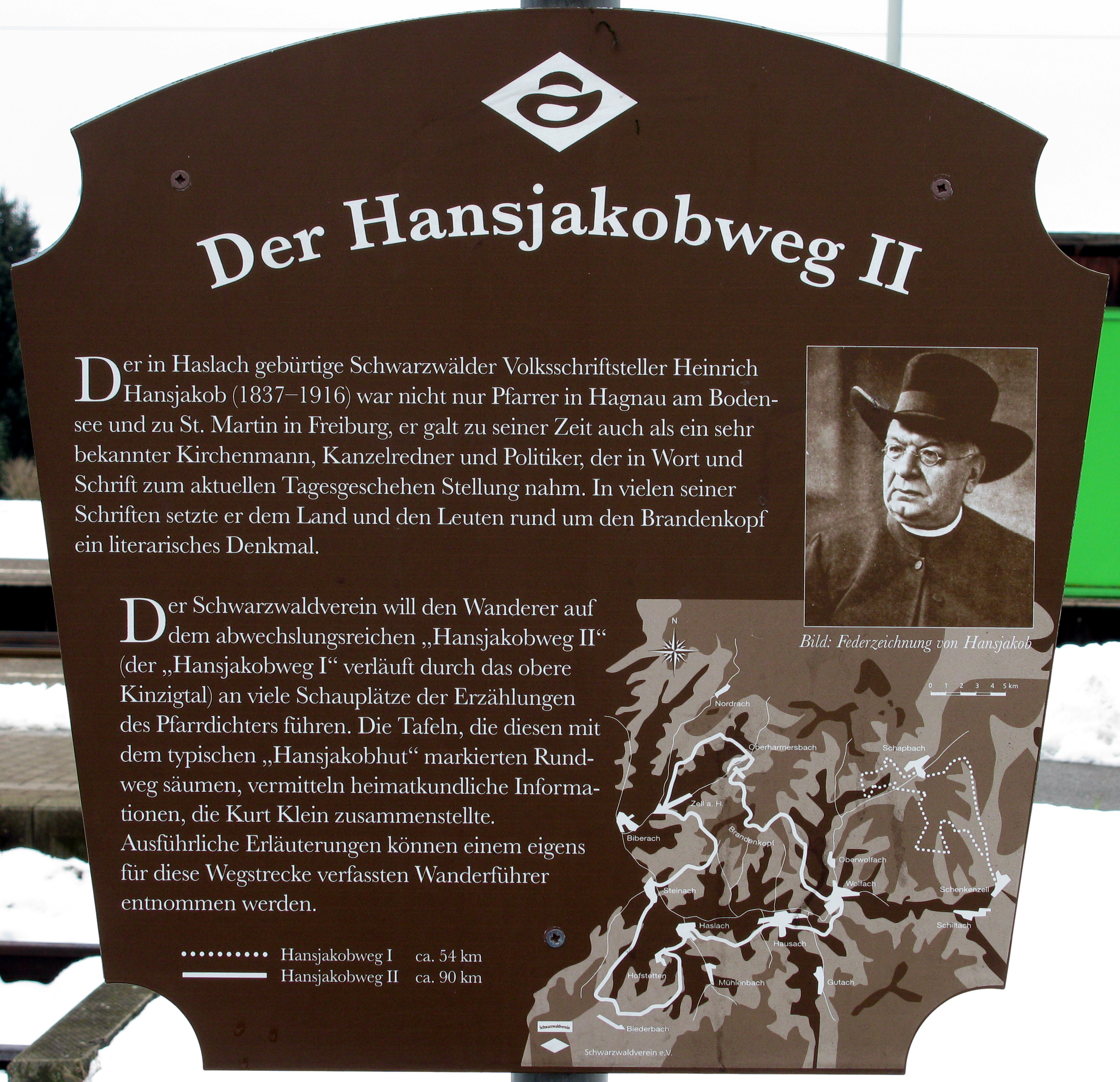
- Information sign at Biberach station
- Length: 92 km
- Location: Germany, Baden-Württemberg, Black Forest
- Trailheads
- Use: Circular walk
- Elevation change: 740 m
- Highest point: Brandenkopf (945 m)
- Lowest point: Steinach (205 m)
- Difficulty: Easy
- Season: Spring to autumn
- Waymark: Black Hansjakob hat in white diamond Waymark
- Sights: Brandenkopf Tower; Urenkopf Tower
- Maintained by: Black Forest Club

The Hansjakob Way II (German: Hansjakobweg II), also called the Great Hansjakob Way (Großer Hansjakobweg), is a five-day circular walk through the Central Black Forest in Germany, from Haslach im Kinzigtal returning to Haslach. The roughly 92-kilometre-long hiking trail is named after the Baden author and parish priest, Heinrich Hansjakob (1837–1916). The route was opened in 1983 and is sponsored and managed by the Black Forest Club.

The waymark is a white diamond with a black Hansjakob hat, the headwear in which Hansjakob is portrayed in many contemporary pictures and photographs. At all the sights along the way, information boards have been erected, that relate mainly to the life and stores of Hansjakob.

== Day tours/stages ==
=== First Stage: Haslach – Wolfach ===
Haslach – Sandhaas Hut – Hausach – Gutach/Tower – Wolfach (16.5 km)

=== Second Stage: Wolfach – Brandenkopf ===
Wolfach – Hohenlochen – Burzbühl – Bettelfrau – Brandenkopf (11 km)

=== Third Stage: Brandenkopf – Zell am Harmersbach ===
Brandenkopf – Durben – Oberharmersbach – Mühlstein (Nordrach) – Zell am Harmersbach (21 km)

=== Fourth Stage: Zell am Harmersbach – Höhenhäuser ===
Zell am Harmersbach – Niller Eck – Steinach – Heidenschlössle – Höhenhäuser (Gasthof Kreuz) (27 km)

=== Fifth Stage: Höhenhäuser – Haslach ===
Höhenhäuser – Biereck – Hansjakob Chapel – Hofstetten – Haslach (17.5 km)

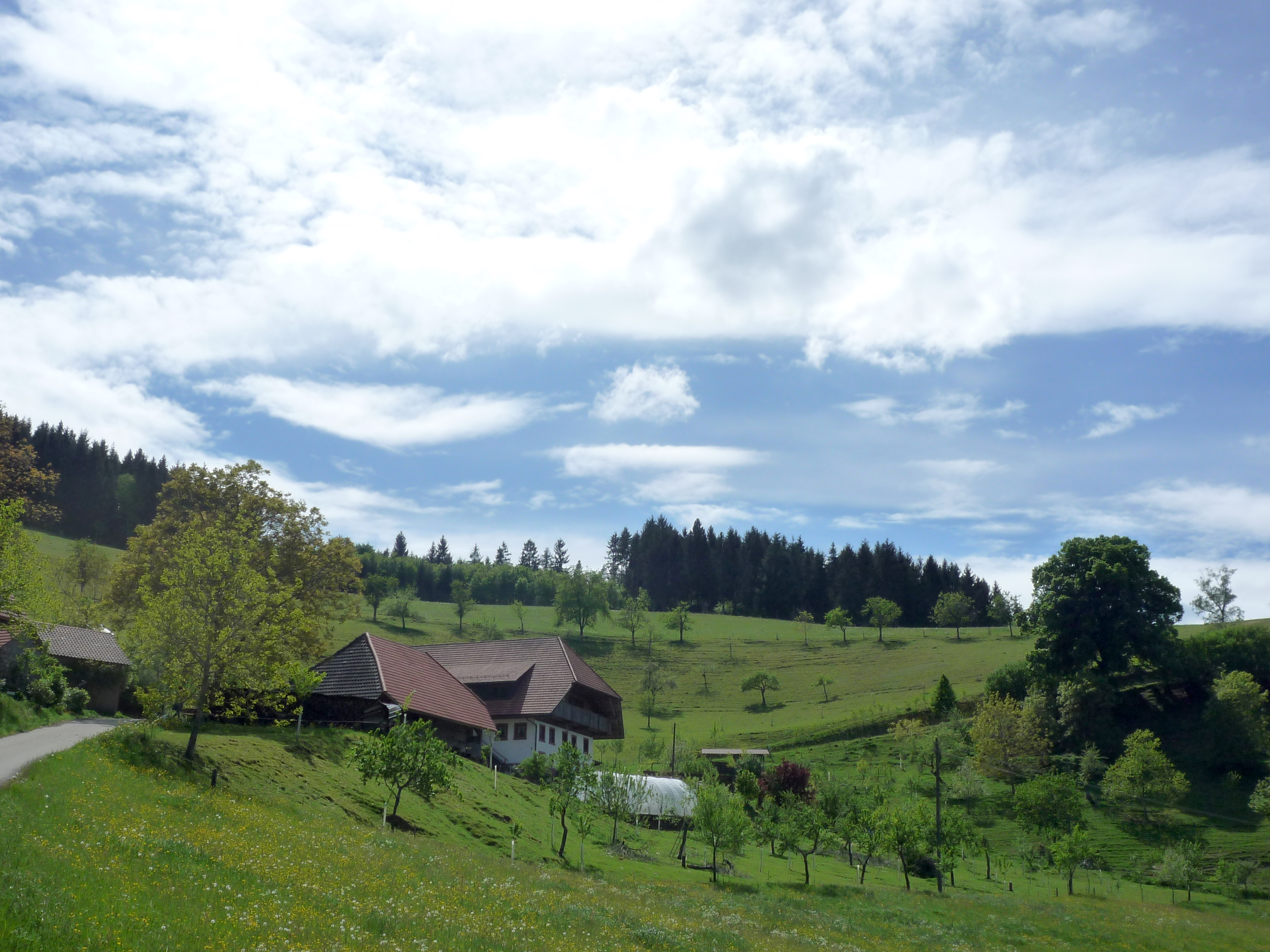
Upper Farm in Sulzbach Valley (1st Stage)

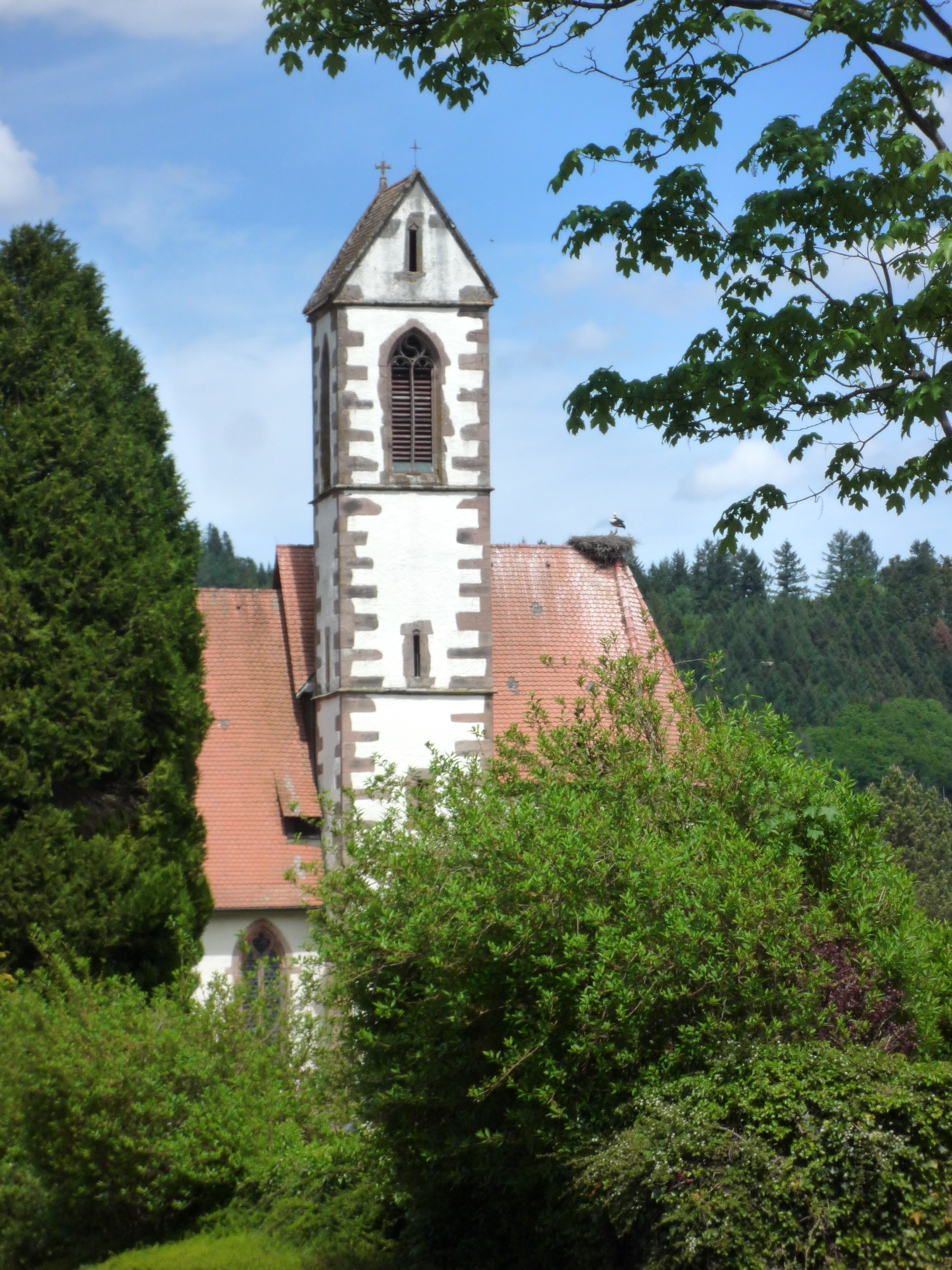
Village Church, Hausach-Dorf (1st Stage)

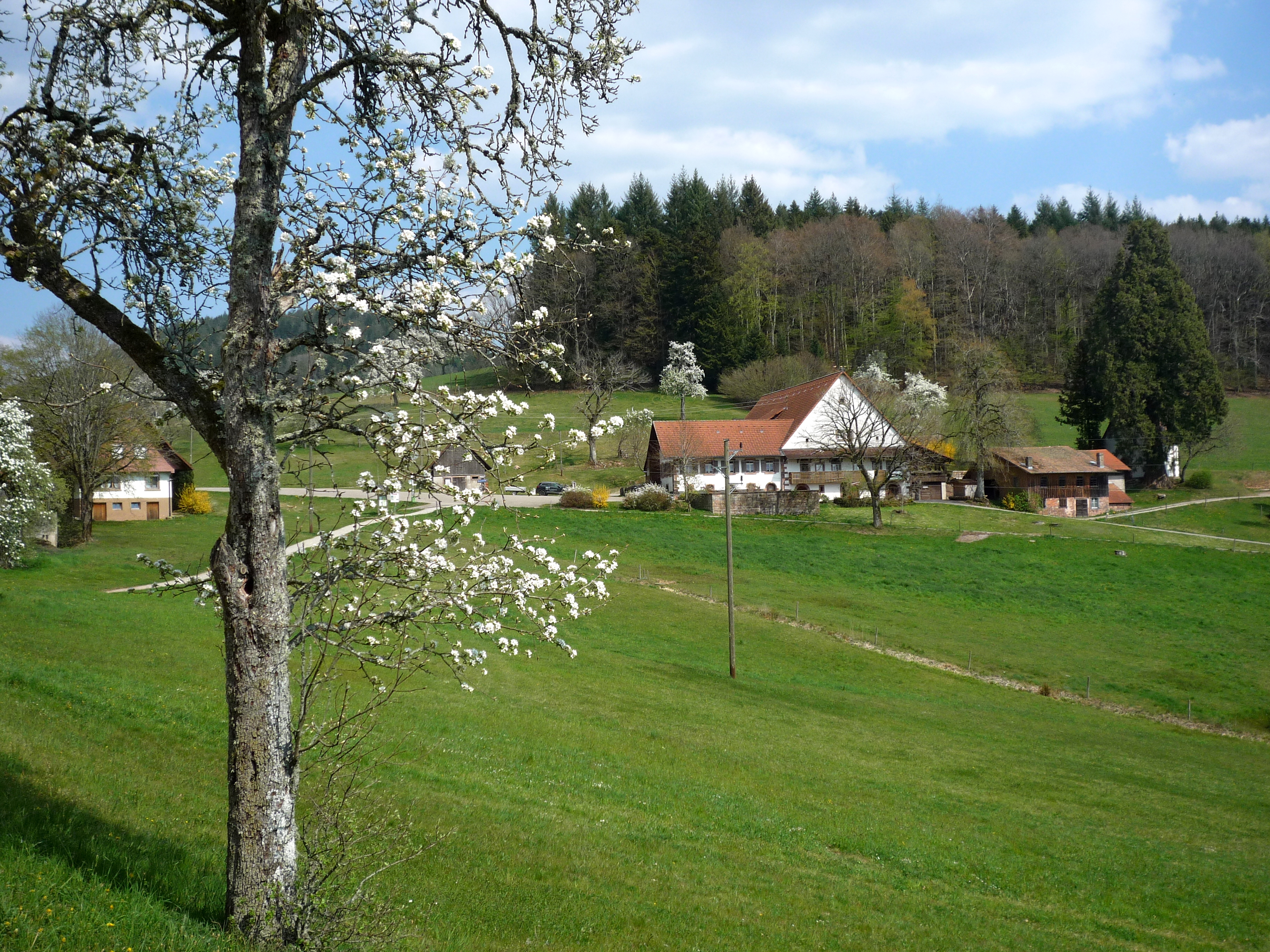
At the Vogt auf Mühlstein (3rd Stage)

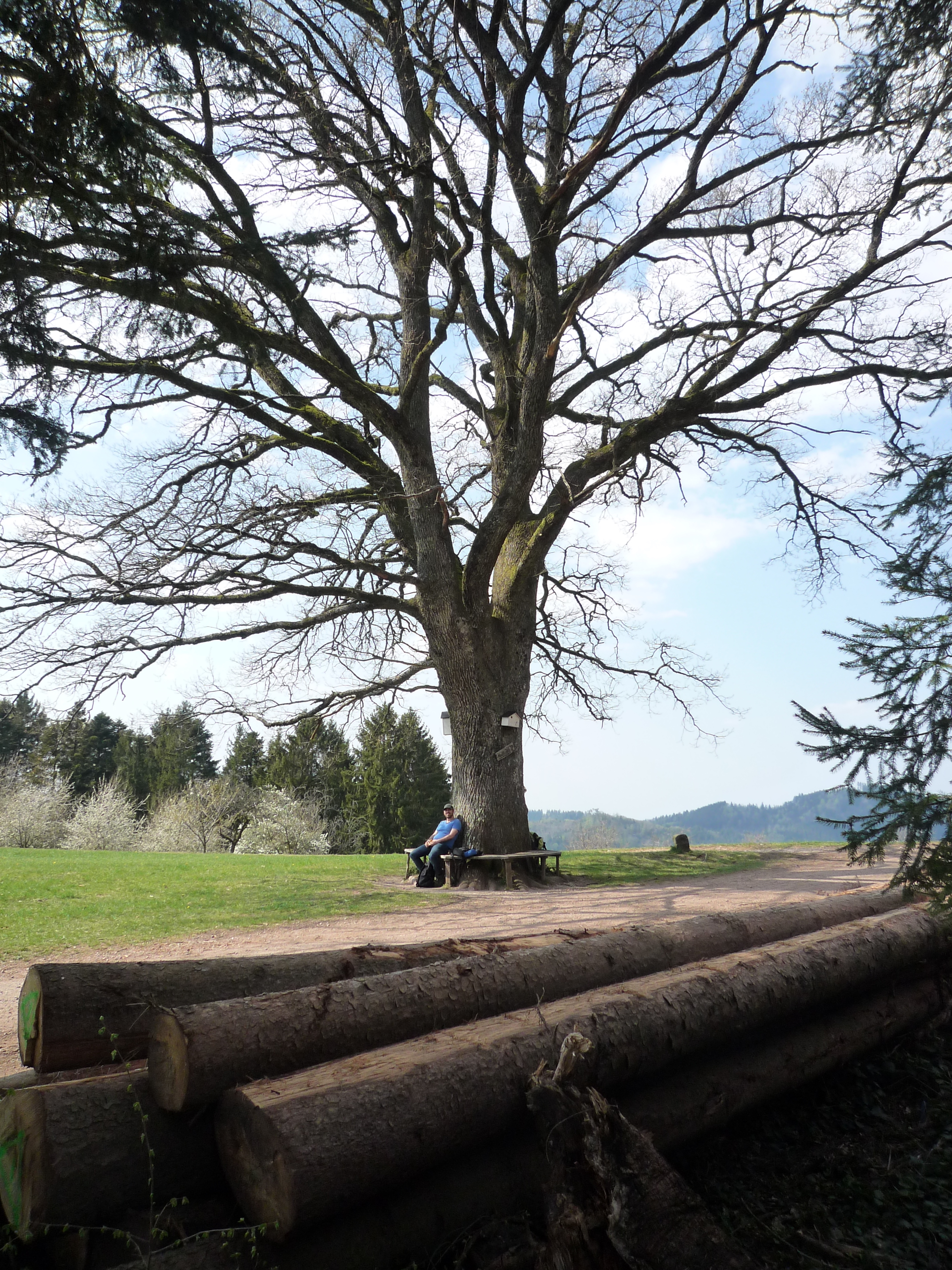
Mostbänkle (‘Cider Bench’; 3rd Stage)

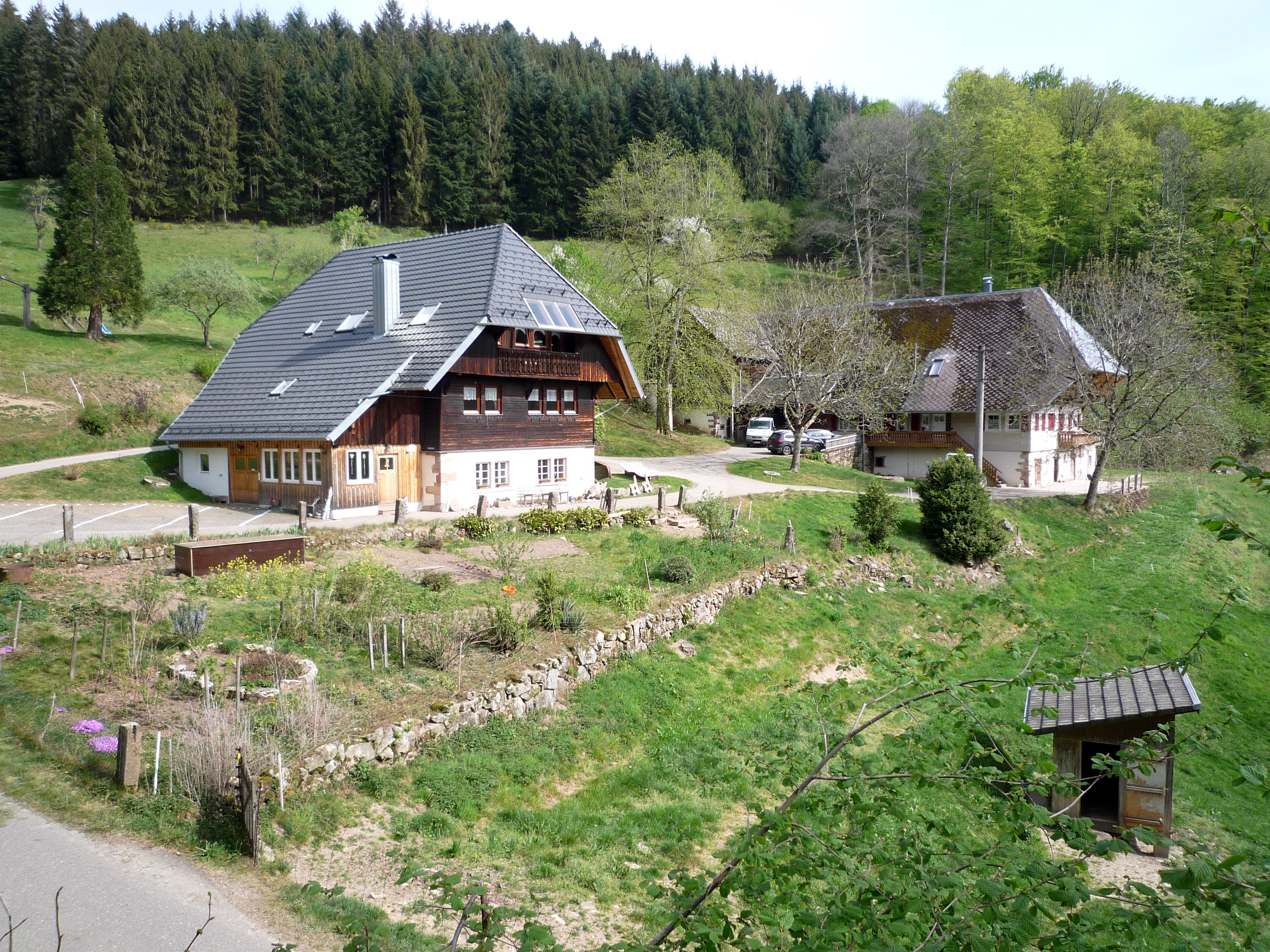
Barberast, Welschbollenbach (4th Stage)

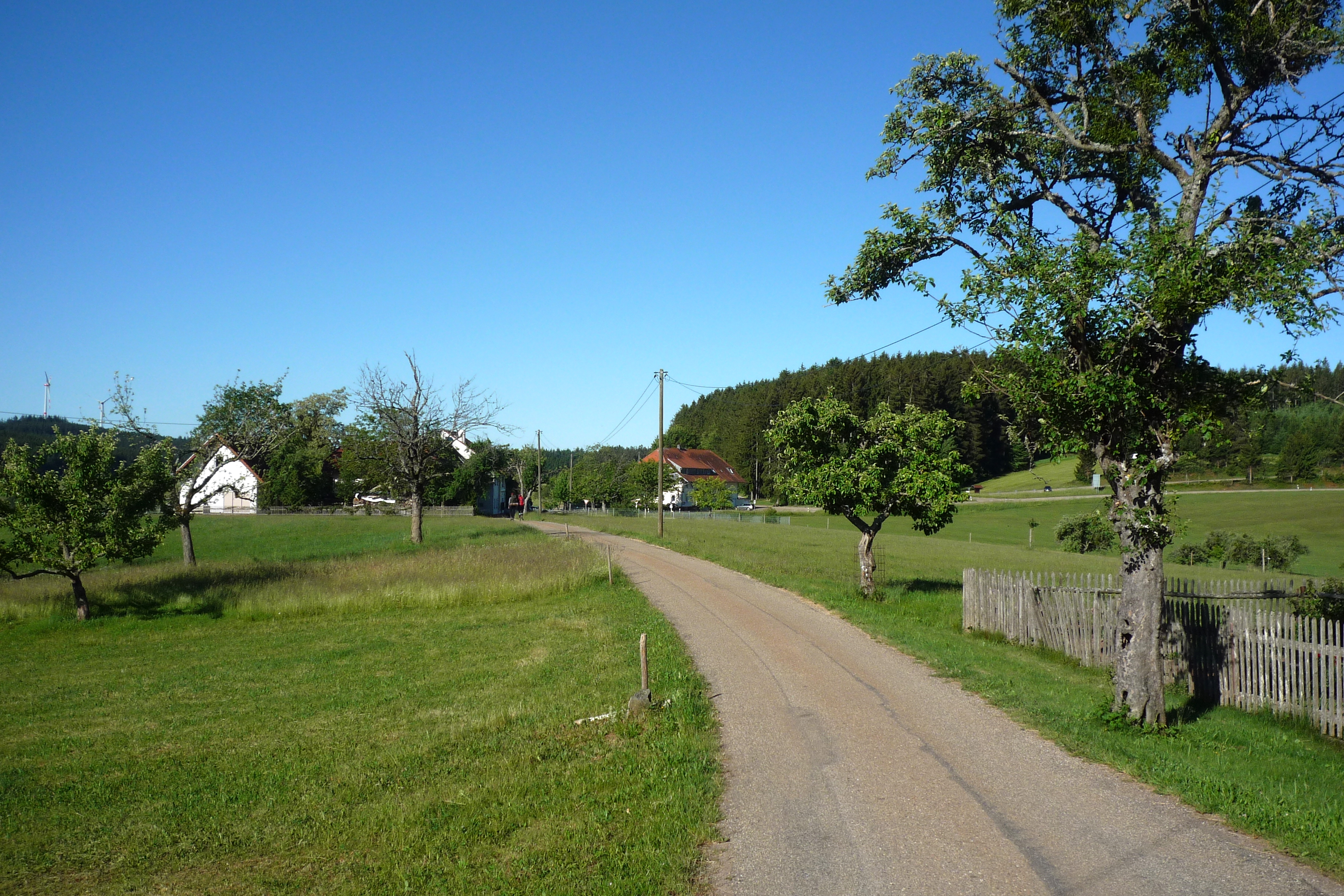
Höhenhäuser (4th/5th Stage)

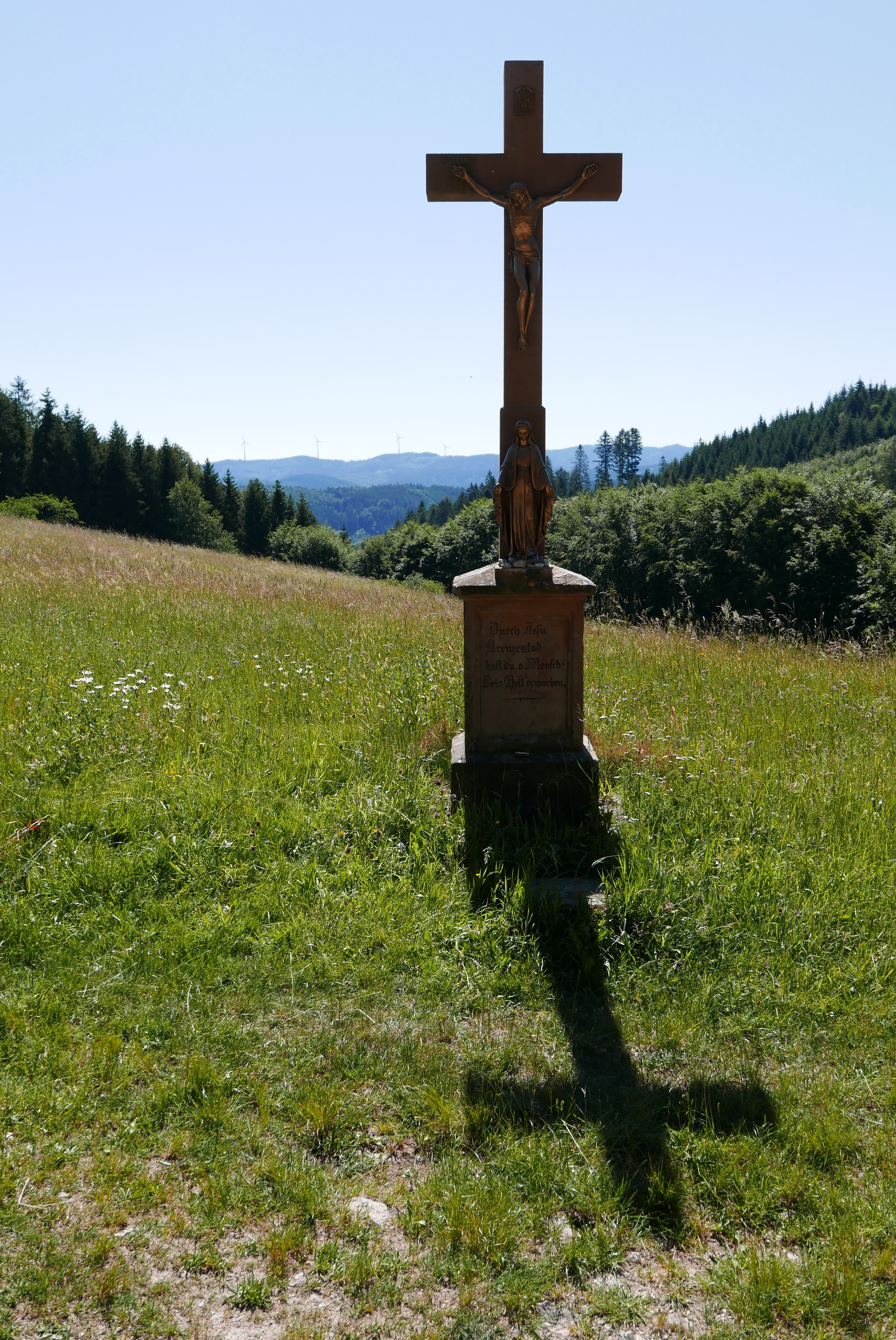
Fehrenbach Crucifix (5th Stage)

== Literature ==
- Martin Kuhnle: Schwarzwald Mitte/Nord. Bergverlag Rother, München 2013, ISBN 978-3-7633-4420-8, S. 166–187.
