= Joshua Epstein =

Joshua Epstein may refer to:

- Joshua M. Epstein, professor of epidemiology
- Joshua Epstein (violinist) (born 1940), Israeli musician
