= Brandenkopf =

Mountain in southern Germany

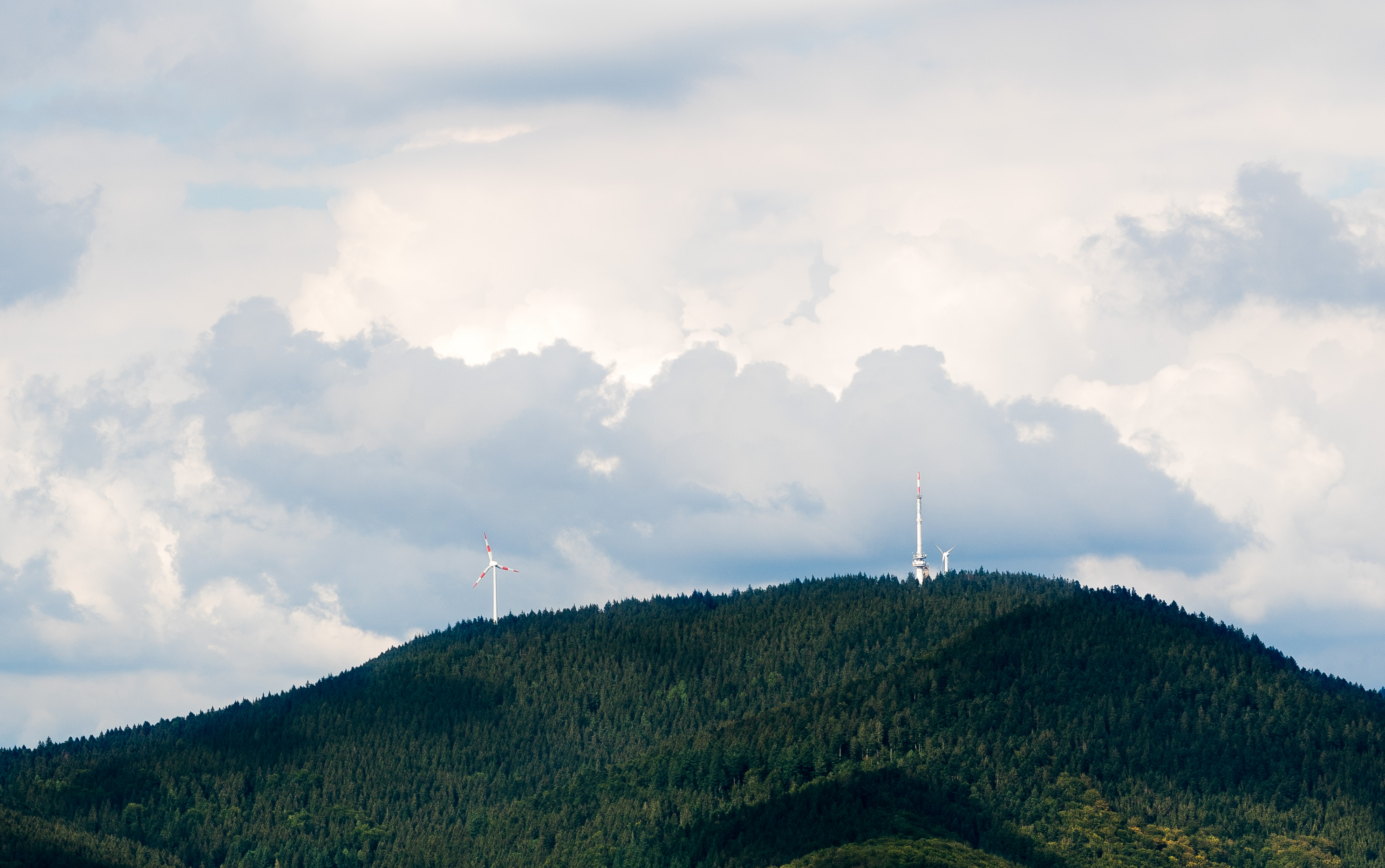
- The Brandenkopf seen from the south

Highest point
- Elevation: 945 m (3,100 ft)
- Coordinates: 48°20′19″N 08°09′13″E

Geography
- Location: Baden-Württemberg, Germany

The Brandenkopf is 945.2 m above sea level (NHN) and one of the highest mountains in the Central Black Forest in southern Germany. The mountain lies in the county of Ortenaukreis in the state of Baden-Württemberg within the municipalities of Oberharmersbach, Fischerbach and Hausach, its summit is part of Oberharmersbach. The mountain forms the prominent centrepiece between the valleys of the Kinzig, the Wolf and the Harmersbach.

The name of the Brandenkopf ("Fire Peak") is derived from a great forest fire in 1730. Before this event it was called the Varnlehenskopf.

The Brandenkopf is well developed with roads and footpaths (including the Hansjakobweg II and a link to the West Way, 3.5 km away) from several directions.

There is a transmitter, the Sender Brandenkopf, on the mountain.

== Sights ==
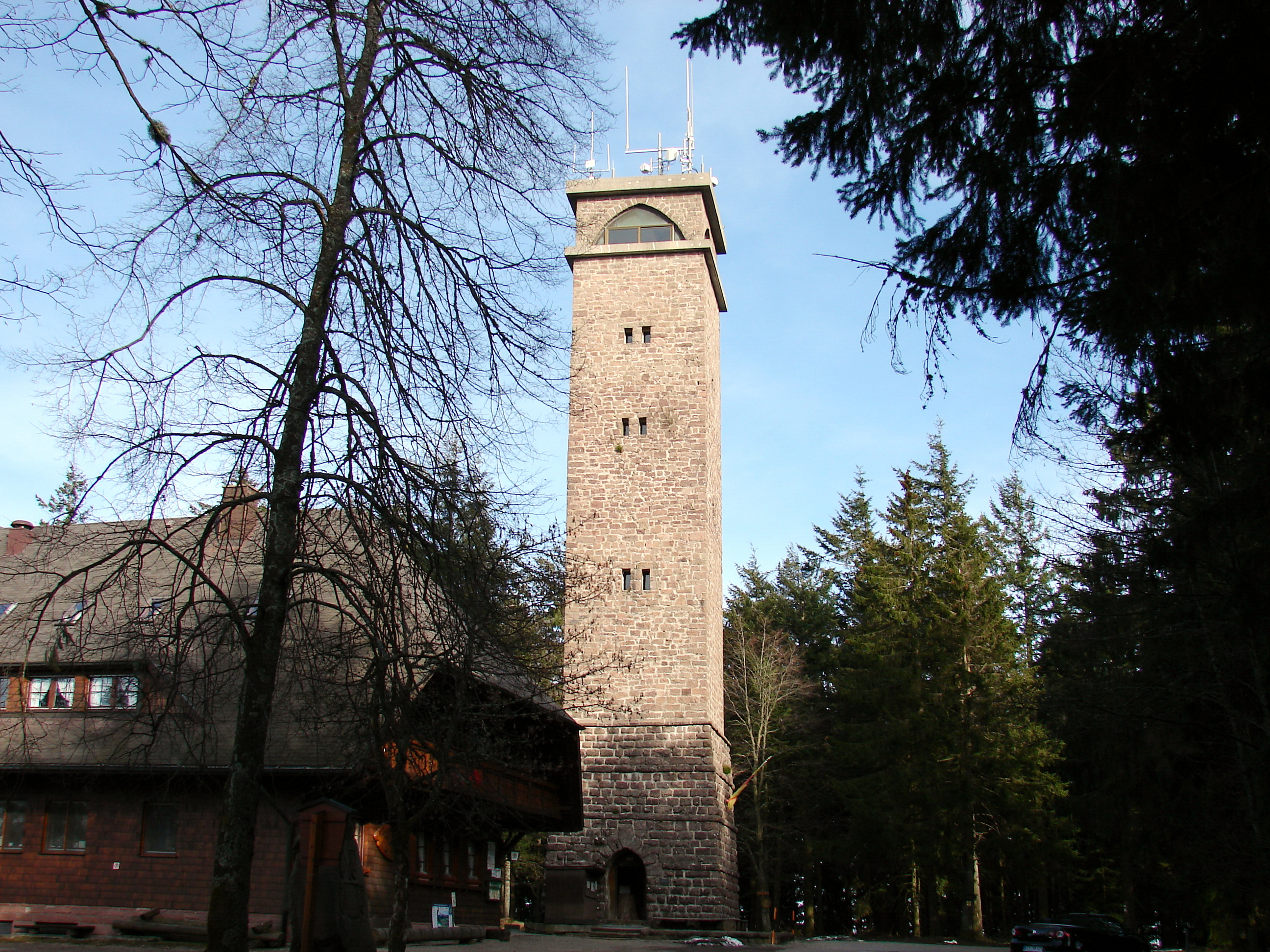
The Brandenkopf Tower

The 32-metre-high Brandenkopf Tower (Brandenkopfturm) has stood on the summit since 1929. This is a stone observation tower, which has extensive views over the Black Forest countryside and, on clear days, as far as the Alps, Vosges and Swabian Jura. Before the stone tower was built there had been wooden predecessor structures.

The Black Forest Club maintains a hiking home and attached café on the Brandenkopf. The favourable location of the mountain, with its average wind speed oft 5.8 m/s at a height of 10 metres is exploited by a wind turbine.

In summer 2002 a second wind turbine, the Bürgerwindrad Brandenkopf, was opened about 350 metres west of the hiking home. This turbine, an Enercon E-58, which has a hub height of 70 metres (100 metres total height) generating a nominal 1000 kW, produces an average of 2,000,000 kWh of electrical power per year. and is thus one of the best sites in Germany in its performance class. In 2006 over 2,300 hours at full load were achieved.
