= Anton Steck =

German violinist and conductor (born 1965)

Anton Steck (born 1965 in Freudenstadt) is a German violinist and conductor.

== Life ==
Steck began studying the modern violin with Jörg-Wolfgang Jahn in Karlsruhe and the baroque violin with Reinhard Goebel in Cologne. After his studies he served as concertmaster for Musica Antiqua Köln and the French ensemble Les Musicians du Louvre under Marc Minkowski. With these ensembles he gave concerts worldwide and has participated in more than thirty CD recordings. In 1996 he co-founded the Schuppanzigh Quartet, where he is first violin. From 2005 to 2008 he was concertmaster of Concerto Köln. In 1997 he made his conducting début with the Handel Festival Orchestra Halle, since 1999 he has been artistic director of this ensemble.

His repertoire ranges from early Baroque to the sonatas and violin concertos of Louis Spohr. The recording of the Sonatas KV 55-60 by Mozart and sonatas by Johann Georg Pisendel been awarded several international record prizes.

Steck, since 2000, is professor of baroque violin and conductor of the Baroque Orchestra of the National Academy of Music Trossingen.

== Instruments ==
Anton Steck plays a Jacob Stainer violin from 1658 and an Alessandro Gagliano from 1701.

== See also ==
- Works by and about Anton Steck in the catalogue of the German National Library
- Personal website of Anton Steck
