= Joshua Epstein (violinist) =

Israeli musical artist

Joshua Epstein יהושע אפשטין
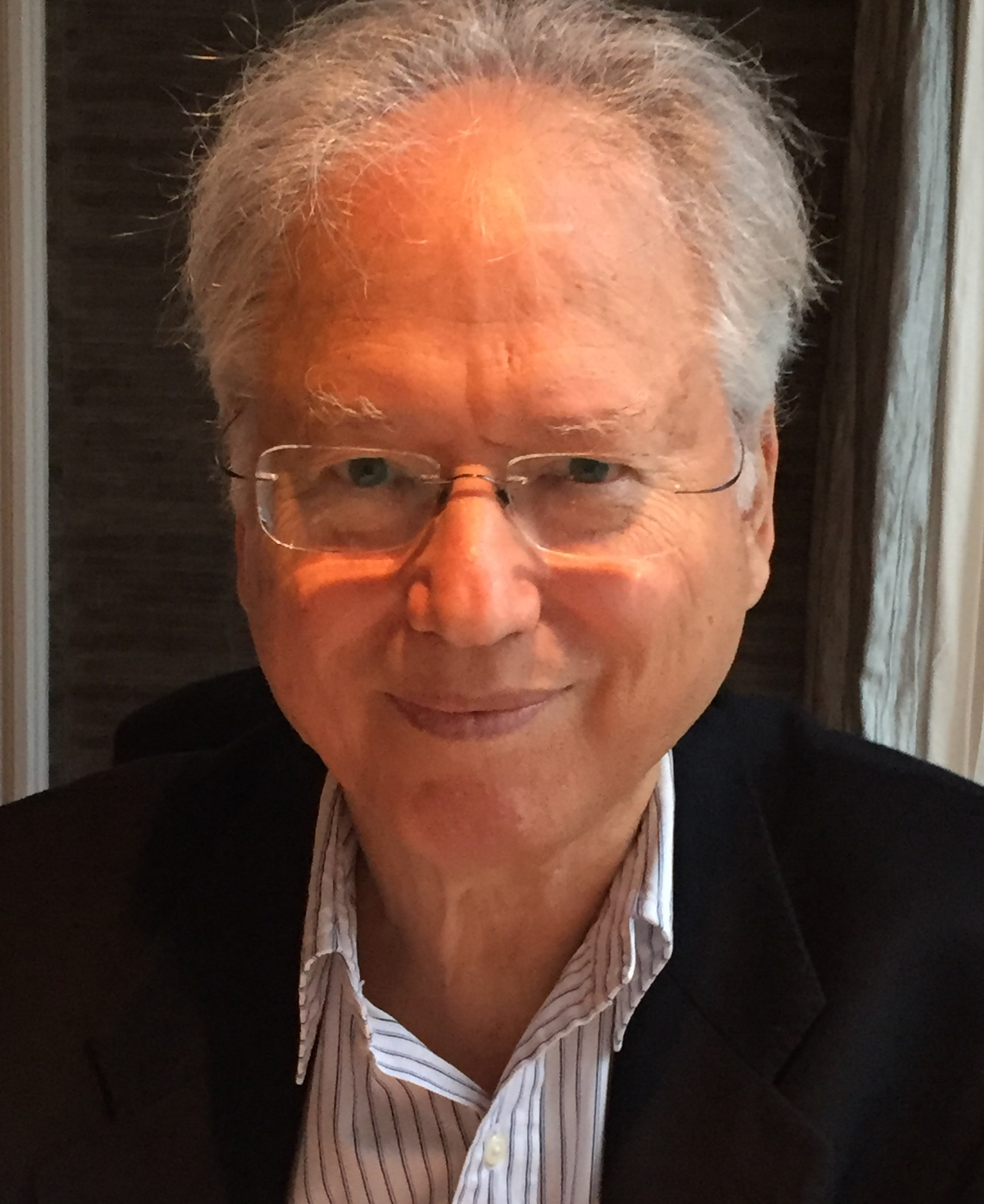

Background information
- Born: November 14, 1940 (age 85); Tel Aviv
- Genre: Classical
- Instrument: Violin
- Website: www.violin-joshuaepstein.com/index.php

Joshua Epstein (Hebrew: יהושע אפשטין; born November 14, 1940) is an Israeli/German musician, classical violinist and music educator. The recipient of many international prizes from violin competitions and recording labels, Epstein's work as a soloist and chamber musician is extensive. Equally extensive is his influence as a professor of violin, which extends over more than half a century. Epstein continues his work at the Hochschule für Musik Saar in Saarbrücken, Germany, where he has lived and taught since 1978.

== Family history ==
Joshua Epstein was the only child of Anna (née Schwertfinger) and Julian Epstein. His mother was born in present-day Izmir, Turkey to parents of Romanian-Jewish origin. Anna's family, moving southward across the Levant, soon arrived in Aleppo, where she and her sisters were schooled in French by the nuns of a local convent. By this time, she was one of nine living children, six girls and three boys. The family later settled just north of the ancient port city of Jaffa in the newly-founded municipality of Tel Aviv.

Joshua's father's family had emigrated to Essen, Germany from Galicia several years before the outbreak of World War I. Julian Epstein (1905–1984) was the youngest of six brothers. By the 1930s, he had become increasingly desperate to escape the growing threats of the Nazi Party. After completing three years of formal education as a carpenter in Holland, Julian managed to get permission to join his brother, Walter, in Tel Aviv in 1936.

== Early life and education ==
Joshua Epstein was born on November 14, 1940. His parents continued to live in the same small apartment in which he was born, on HaShoftim Street, until 1975. As a child, Joshua spoke French with his mother, German with his father and Hebrew outside of the home and in school.

Joshua received his first violin lessons from Yariv Ezrahi when he was 8 years old and progressed quickly. He moved to Belgium to pursue a career in violin when he was 19 years old.

In Brussels, Epstein was admitted to the Royal Conservatory and studied as a student of Arthur Grumiaux for two years, later also completing a special degree in chamber music. He then transferred to the class of André Gertler and entered the Queen Elisabeth Music Chapel (1962–1965) under his tuition. After graduating, Epstein served as Gertler's assistant at the Hochschule für Musik und Theater in Hanover, Germany (1966–1972) and won prizes at several international violin competitions.

== Awards ==
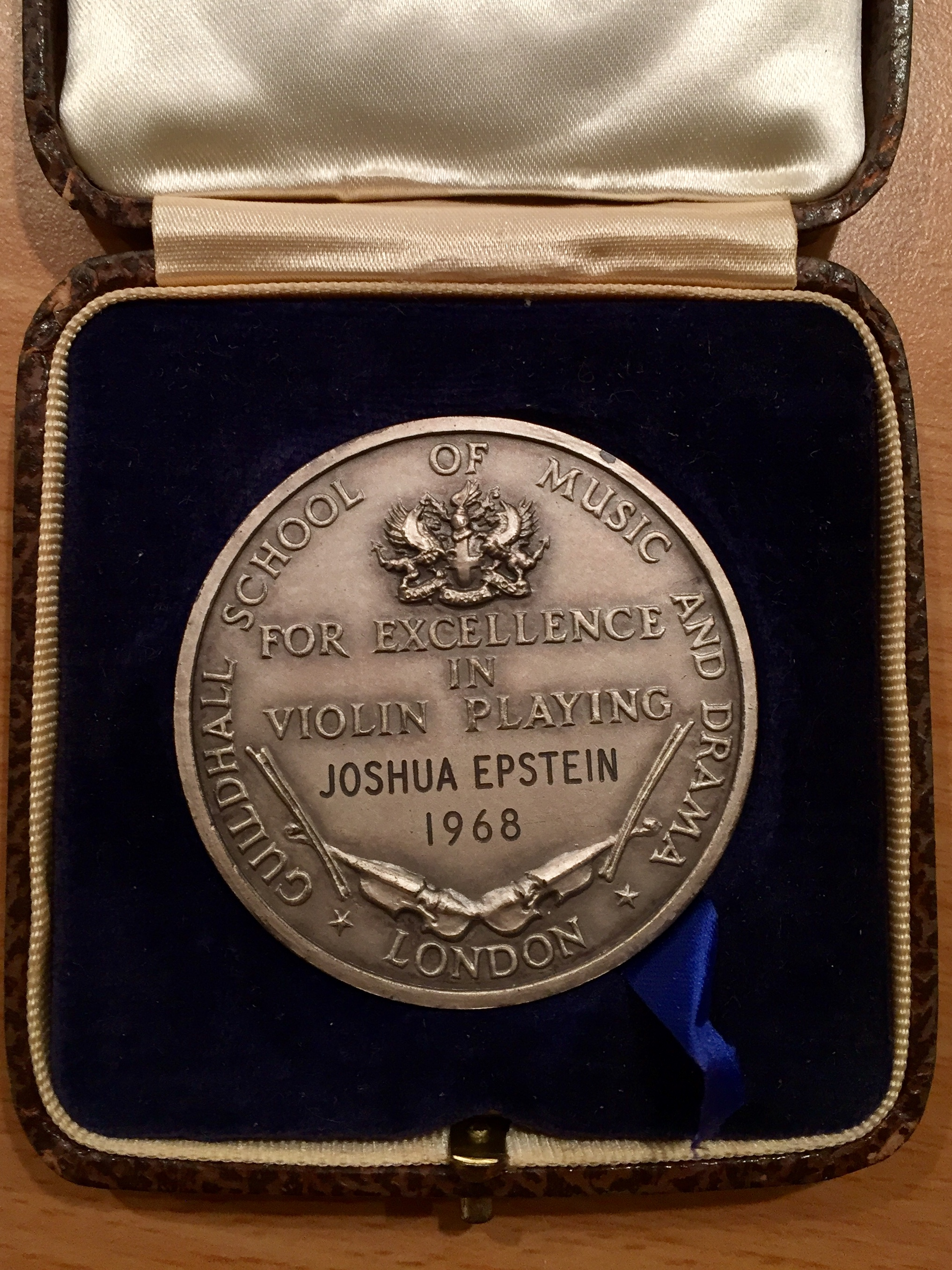
1st Prize, City of London Carl Flesch International Violin Competition, 1968

In 1965 Epstein flew to Helsinki, Finland for the first ever International Jean Sibelius Violin Competition. He came away with second prize, the first having been won by the young Soviet talent, Oleg Kagan. He then entered the Queen Elisabeth International Violin Competition in the city of his alma mater in 1967. As a finalist, he performed the Sibelius Concerto, Op. 47; the Hindemith 4th Violin Concerto and the Bartok 1st Rhapsodie, et al. A year later, Epstein went on to win first prize at the 1968 City of London Carl Flesch Competition.

The Queen Elisabeth Competition takes place every four years. Epstein entered again in 1971 and was again a finalist. This time, he played the Mendelssohn Concerto, Op. 64; the Wieniawski Polonaise in D major.

== Career ==
After his competition successes, Epstein launched his career as a soloist and over the next 40 years performed with many orchestras across the Continent: the Oslo Philharmonic, Bergen Philharmonic, RIAS Berlin, Saarländischer Rundfunk, NDR Hamburg, Bayerischer Rundfunk, Bayerische Staatsoper, Nürnberger Symphoniker, Berliner Symphoniker, to mention just a few. He is especially known for his interpretations of Bach, Mozart, Paganini and Bartók and has given recitals in France, Germany, Belgium, England, Scandinavia, Italy, Spain, the United States and Canada; Israel, Turkey, Iran and South Korea.

Between 1971 and 2005, Epstein performed all 24 Paganini Caprices in concert six times. In 1997 he recorded them for the Agora label in two days.

=== Chamber music ===
The Bartholdy String Quartet was founded in 1968 by a group of young musicians performing and teaching at music academies in the German cities of Karlsruhe and Würzburg. When an accident forced their original viola player to resign, the group's first violinist, Jörg-Wolfgang Jahn, decided to change instruments. Thus the Bartholdy Quartet was in need of a first violinist. In 1972, Epstein traveled to Linkenheim, near Karlsruhe, to meet with them. With Jahn playing viola, Annemarie Dengler-Speermann as the group's cellist, Max Speermann as second violin and Epstein as the new primarius, they toured throughout Europe, North America and the near east to great acclaim. The group worked together from 1972 until 1978, earning the Deutscher Schallplattenpreis and the Grand Prix du disque for their recordings of Mendelssohn and Schubert.

Later, from 1988 until 1993, Epstein served as musical director of the Saarbrücker Kammermusiktage, an annual chamber music festival in Saarbrücken.

=== Teaching ===
Joshua Epstein's violin teaching was influenced by the Hungarian violinist André Gertler and by the Feldenkrais Method. Among his many teaching positions, Epstein has served as Professor of Violin at the University of Music Würzburg (1974–1978), Conservatoire de Strasbourg (1994–2005), the Hochschule für Musik Saar (1978–present) and the Dokuz Eylul University State Conservatory in Izmir, Turkey (2012-2018). Epstein has given masterclasses in cities around the world, including Italy, Belgium, France (Moulin d'Andé), Turkey, South Korea, et al.

Epstein was the director of the annual International Summer Academy Schwetzingen-Worms, a two-week summer music festival and master class which took place from 2003 until 2023.

== Partial discography ==
=== Chamber music ===
==== Bartholdy Quartett ====
Performed by Joshua Epstein, first violin; Max Speermann, second violin; Jörg-Wolfgang Jahn, viola; Annemarie Dengler-Speermann, cello:

- 1979: Beethoven, Ludwig van. String Quartet No. 13; No. 17 ('Grosse Fuge'). EMI Electrola 1C 063-30 847.
- 1978: Schubert, Franz. String Quartet No. 15. EMI Electrola 1C 063-30 788.
- 1976: Debussy, Claude. String Quartet No. 1, and Paul Hindemith, String Quartet No. 3. EMI Electrola 1C 057-30 694.
- 1974: Mendelssohn Bartholdy, Felix. Complete String Quartets, Vol. II. BASF 39 21966-6. Digitally re-issued on CD: Acantha 43 075.
- 1973: Mendelssohn Bartholdy, Felix. Complete String Quartets, Vol. I. Acantha-Bellaphon CD 43 075.

==== Other ====
- 1998: Strauss, Richard. Piano Quartet, Op. 13 and Sonata for Violin and Piano, Op. 18. Performed by J. Epstein, J. C. Vanden Eynden, V. Mendelssohn, A. Dmitriev.
- 1975: Beethoven, Ludwig van. Septet, Op. 20. Perf. by J. Epstein, J. W. Jahn, A. Bylsma, A. Woodrow, P. Honingh, A. van Woudenberg, and B. Pollard. BASF 20 22234-9.

=== Violin solo ===
Performed by Joshua Epstein, violin:

- 1998: Bach, Johann Sebastian. Sonatas and Partitas for Solo Violin. Agorá AG 110.2.
- 1998: Fireworks for Violin. Uwe Brandt, piano. Agorá AG 142.1.
- 1997: Paganini, Niccolò. 24 Caprices, Op. 1. Agorá AG 108.1.
- 1986: Bloch, Ernest. Poème Mystique, Baal-Schem Suite, Avodah/Melodie. Eugène de Canck, piano. Schwann Musica Mundi VMS 1053.
- 1973: Beethoven, Ludwig van. Sonata No. 9 "Kreutzer" and Bela Bartók, Sonata for Solo Violin. Jean-Claude Vanden Eynden, piano. Deutsche Grammophon 2555 009.

=== Other ===
- 1997: Saarbrücker Kammermusiktage. Bela Bartók, Kontrasts: J. Epstein, S. Douwes, D. Blumenthal; Maurice Ravel, Sonate No. 2 for Violin and Piano: J. Epstein, N. Shetler. Saarländischer Rundfunk 97.020.
- 1992: Musik aus dem Saarland. Bela Bartok et al. Rhapsodie No. 2 for Violin and Orchestra. Rundfunk Symphony Orchestra, Saarbrücken. Arbeit und Kultur Saarland GmbH 97082/1.
