= Xaver Paul Thoma =

German composer (born 1953)

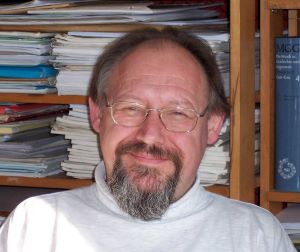
Xaver Paul Thoma (2005)

Xaver Paul Thoma (born 5 February 1953) is a German composer of contemporary music, violist and music educator.

== Life ==
Thoma was born on 5 February 1953 in the Gasthaus zur Kanone in Haslach im Kinzigtal, the home of the Thoma family of artists. At the age of five, he received a violin and first violin lessons from his grandfather, city music director Karl Thoma (1890–1978). At the age of 12, he started to compose. In 1968, he began his studies at the Musikhochschule in Karlsruhe, with Albert Dietrich violin / viola and chamber music, later with Professor Jörg-Wolfgang Jahn. He studied music theory with Roland Weber and Eugen Werner Velte.

From 1972, he played many great works as a violist in the Badische Staatskapelle Karlsruhe and began to compose intensively. His first works were intended for his fellow musicians. In order to have more time for his compositional work, he resigned from his position in the Badische Staatskapelle in 1977 and began his freelance work as a composer, violist and music teacher. He composed important works such as his first String Quartet (1972/75) or the "Reflexionen Eines Musikalischen Traumas" for large orchestra with solo viola (1979).

In 1980, Thoma moved to Solkau (Lower Saxony). At irregular intervals, he invites to the Loitz Chamber Concerts in his half-timbered farmhouse. For each concert, he also writes a composition for the respective instrumentation. The Loitz concerts soon became a cultural institution beyond the region. A special connection to the Niedersächsische Staatstheater Hannover was established: on the one hand he plays the viola in the orchestra and on the other hand he receives commissions for compositions such as the opera Draußen vor der Tür and the ballet Kafka.

In 1989, the family moved to the Tauber valley (Bad Mergentheim), later Königshofen. This is where the great commissioned works were created. His II. Kammersymphonie was written on the occasion of his composer portrait at the Dresden Centre for Contemporary Music. Since 2001, Thoma has been living and working in Kirchheim unter Teck. Thoma has produced a large number of works.

== Honours ==
Thoma was awarded the Lower Saxony Artists' Scholarship in 1983 in recognition of his compositional work. In 1984, he was awarded the Lower Saxony Work Scholarship for writing down the score of the Concerto for Viola and Orchestra op. 34.

Numerous commissions were received from renowned orchestras and institutions. The Staatstheater Hannover commissioned him with several compositions. His main works for several years are the Chamber opera Draußen vor der Tür (premiere Hannover 1994–1995, new production in Leipzig 1995–1998) and KAFKA, the full-length ballet for large orchestra (premiere 1997, choreography by Lothar Höfgen).

In 1993/94, he received several commissions for the 400th anniversary of the Staatstheater Stuttgart. Since the official census of works began in 1972, over 140 compositions have been written, many of them as commissioned works: opera, ballet, chamber music, choral works, song, instrumental concerts, and orchestra works.

== Important premieres ==
- 1975 Die Traumtragenden für 8 Bratschen und soprano (text Oskar Kokoschka) Badisches Staatstheater Karlsruhe
- 1978 Erste Kammersymphonie für 20 Spieler, Mitglieder der Badischen Staatskapelle Karlsruhe
- 1979 "Reflexionen" für großes Orchester mit Solo-Bratsche – Versuch über Berlioz, Philharmonisches Orchester der Stadt Freiburg im Breisgau
- 1980 "Drei Impressionen" Nach Gedichten von Paul Celan für zwei Bratschen, Graz, Werner Ehrbrecht und Ulrich Drüner – Bratsche, Auftrag: Viola Gesellschaft, Deutschland,
- 1988/89 Zweite Kammersymphonie für 16 Spieler, musica-viva-ensemble dresden, Auftrag: Dresdner Zentrum für zeitgenössische Musik
- 1989 Concerto Grosso, Auftrag: Philharmonisches Orchester der Stadt Freiburg, Donald C. Runnicles – Dirigent
- 1992/93 Draußen vor der Tür – Chamber opera after Wolfgang Borchert's opera, Auftrag: Niedersächsische Staatsoper Hannover, Anthony Bramell – Dirigent
- 1993 Hölderlin-FRAGMENTE für tenor und großes Orchester, Michael Gielen – conductor, Wolfgang Bünten – Tenor Auftrag: Staatstheater Stuttgart
- 1994 Wie ein zerrissen Saitenspiel – Konzert für Violine und Orchester, Joachim Schall – Solovioline, Philippe Auguin – Conductor, Auftrag: Staatsorchester Stuttgart
- 1995/96 Kafka – Ballet in 21 Bildern von Lothar Höfgen, Auftrag: Niedersächsische Staatsoper Hannover
- 1997 Konzert für Oboe d’amore und Orchester, Auftrag: Philharmonisches Orchester Augsburg, Peter Leonard – Dirigent, Gerhard Veith – Oboe d’amore
- 1998 3. Solosonate für Bratsche allein, Auftrag: Brahmstage Lübeck, Barbara Westphal – Viola
- 2003 Sextet op. 130 for 2 violins, 2 violas, 2 cellos, Asperger Kammersolisten.

== Violist ==
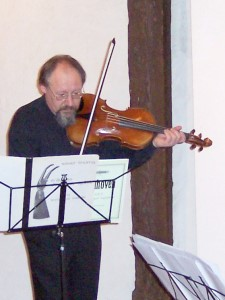
Xaver Paul Thoma 2004

From 1972 to 1980, Thoma gave concerts as a viola player in the elective quartet, participated in selection concerts of young artists, various master classes, among others with the Bartók Quartet. After several years of chamber music in various formations, the Quintetto coll'arco developed with former colleagues of the Wahl-Quartet in 1999. With this quintet, among others, a radio production of his string quintet (1998) was produced in the SWR-Studio Karlsruhe.

In 1972, he started his professional career as a viola player in the Badische Staatskapelle Karlsruhe and in later years played as a freelancer in various orchestras, among others in the Lower Saxony State Orchestra Hanover and NDR Hamburg. Since 1977, he has been a member of the Bayreuth Festival and since 1990 of the Stuttgart State Orchestra. Many compositions were written for different instrumentations, for example his Nachtstücke.

== Music educator ==
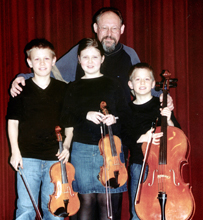
Xaver Paul Thoma with his pupils, winner of the regional competition Jugend musiziert 2005

Since the time of his studies, intensive teaching activity has been the balance between composing and active music-making. In three decades, he composed pieces for young people, such as:

- Terzettino piccolo für 2 Violinen und Violoncello (2004)
- B. A. C. H. – Skizze für Orchester (1994)
