= Jörg-Wolfgang Jahn =

German violinist

Jörg-Wolfgang Jahn (born 1936) is a German violinist and music educator.

== Life ==
Born in Saalfeld, Jahn studied violin in Cologne with Max Rostal. He also took chamber music lessons with Maurits Frank, Günter Kehr, János Starker and the members of the Quartetto Italiano. He also took part to the Bundesauswahl Konzerte Junger Künstler. In 1963, he received a first prize at the Felix Mendelssohn Bartholdy Prize (piano trio).

Since 1968 Jahn was a lecturer and from 1972 to 2001 professor for violin and chamber music at the Hochschule für Musik Karlsruhe, where he was responsible for chamber music and for the chamber orchestra of the university. He gave master classes in Europe and oversea as well as chamber music courses in Germany and abroad. Among his students were Isabel Charisius, Cordelia Palm, Anton Steck, Xaver Paul Thoma, Tianwa Yang and in the field of chamber music the Fauré Quartet and the Mandelring Quartet, among others.

His artistic activity consists of concertmaster activities in chamber and symphony orchestras. He is a member of the Bartholdy-Quartet (founded in 1968). Jahn has participated in television, film, radio and recordings, including the complete recording of the string quartets of Felix Mendelssohn Bartholdy.

== Awards ==
- Grand Prix du Disque
- Deutscher Schallplattenpreis for the complete recording (1973) of the string quartets by Felix Mendelssohn Bartholdy
