= Heinrich Hansjakob =

German author (1837–1916)

Heinrich Hansjakob (1837- 1916, pseudonym: Hans am See) was a German Catholic priest and Baden historian and politician who was especially well known as a writer. In addition to scientific works, political writings and travel reports, he also published stories and novels, based mainly on the local history of the Central Black Forest and the mentality of people in that region.

== Life ==
=== Haslach period ===
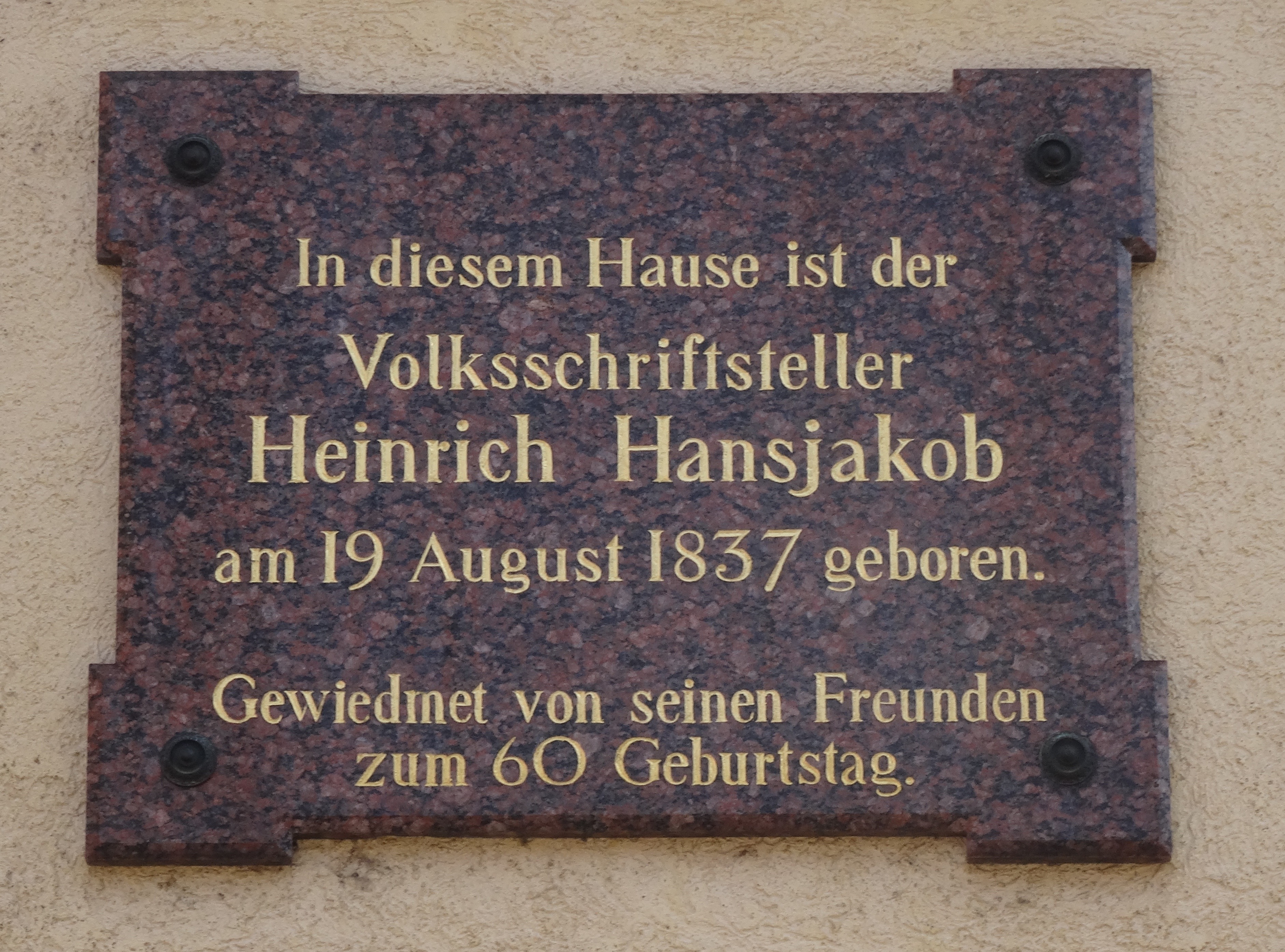
Board at Hansjakob's place of birth in Haslach

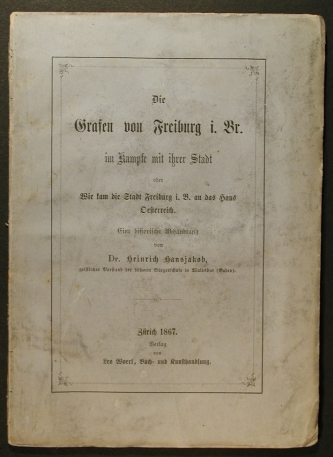
Hansjakob's dissertation

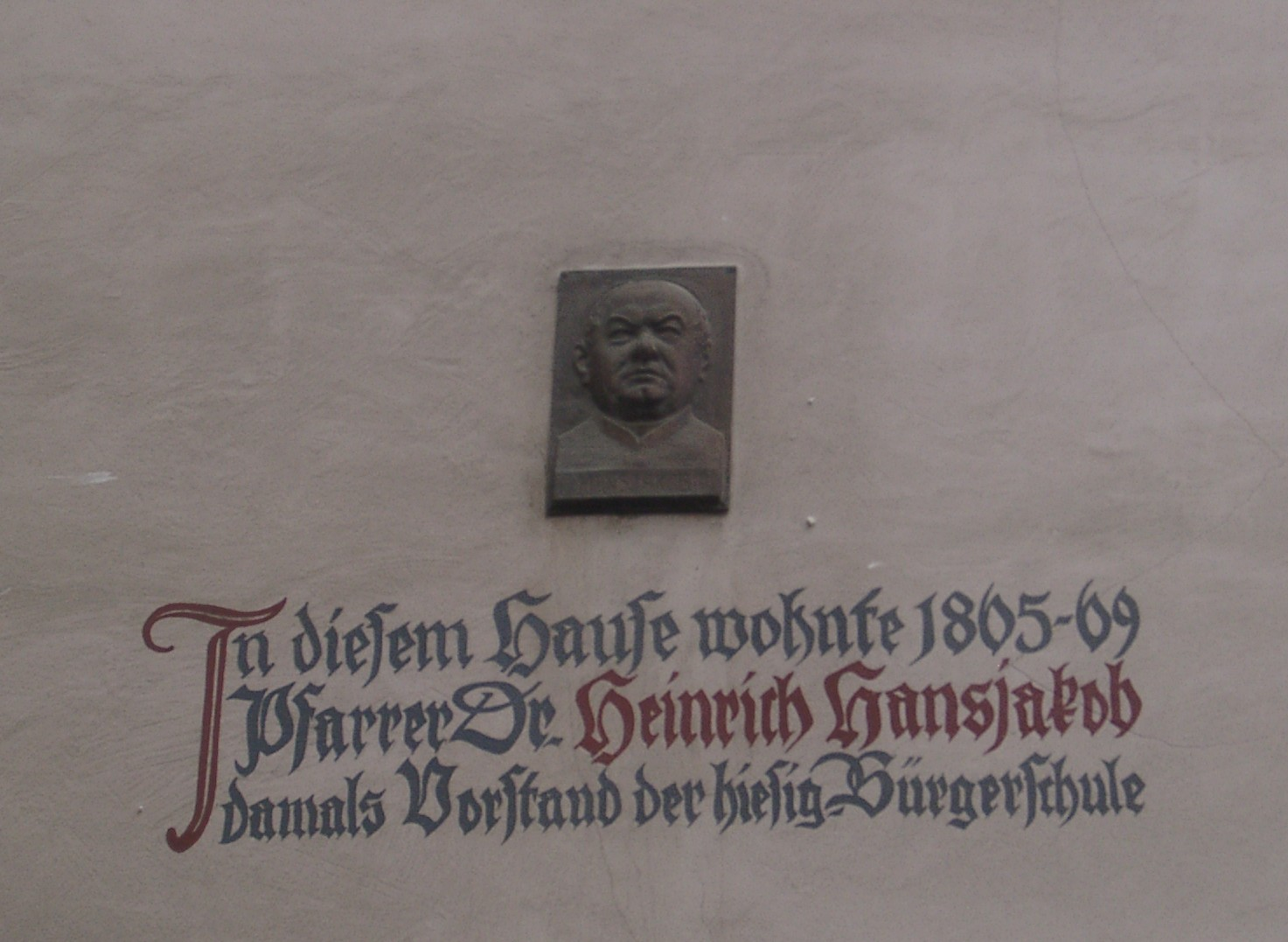
Exhibition at his residence in Waldshut

Heinrich Hansjakob born on 19 August 1837 in Haslach in the Kinzig valley as the son of baker and innkeeper, Philipp Hansjakob, and his wife, Cäcilie née Kaltenbach. His mother came from the village of Rohrbach in Furtwangen im Schwarzwald. On his father's side, the family of Hansjakob had lived on the Kinzig since the end of the Thirty Years' War. From 1852 to 1859 he went to the lyceum in Rastatt. Thereafter he studied theology, philosophy and classical philology at the University of Freiburg. In 1863 he was ordained as a priest. In 1865 he graduated from the University of Tübingen with a historical treatise on the Counts of Freiburg.

=== Donaueschingen and Waldshut period ===
From 20 January 1864, after his studies, he was initially a student teacher for a year at Donaueschingen Grammar School. Here he became friends with the director of the Fürstenberg archives, Karl Roth von Schreckenstein, and the librarian, Karl August Barack. With their encouragement he wrote his dissertation, The Counts of Freiburg im Breisgau at War with Their Town (Die Grafen von Freiburg im Breisgau im Kampfe mit ihrer Stadt). In 1865 he was promoted to chairman of the Citizen's High School (Höheren Bürgerschule) in Waldshut. In Waldshut he ran his own household with his sister, Philippine. During his time in Waldshut he published, in Advent 1866, the paper, The Salpeterers, a Politico-Religious Sect and the biography of Hermann von Vicari, Archbishop of Freiburg. Both papers brought the authorities onto the scene. The latter publication was confiscated and banned. As a result, in 1869,.he resigned from his position as head of the Citizen's School. Because he now felt unfettered, he gave a talk in Engen which was critical of the government under Minister Jolly, whereupon he was incarcerated in Rastatt Fortress for a month for slander. Here he published the book, In the Fortress (Auf der Festung). The short book, The Waldshut War of 1468 (Der Waldshuter Krieg von 1468), was also published during his time at Waldshut, appearing in 1868.

=== Pastor in Hagnau am Bodensee ===
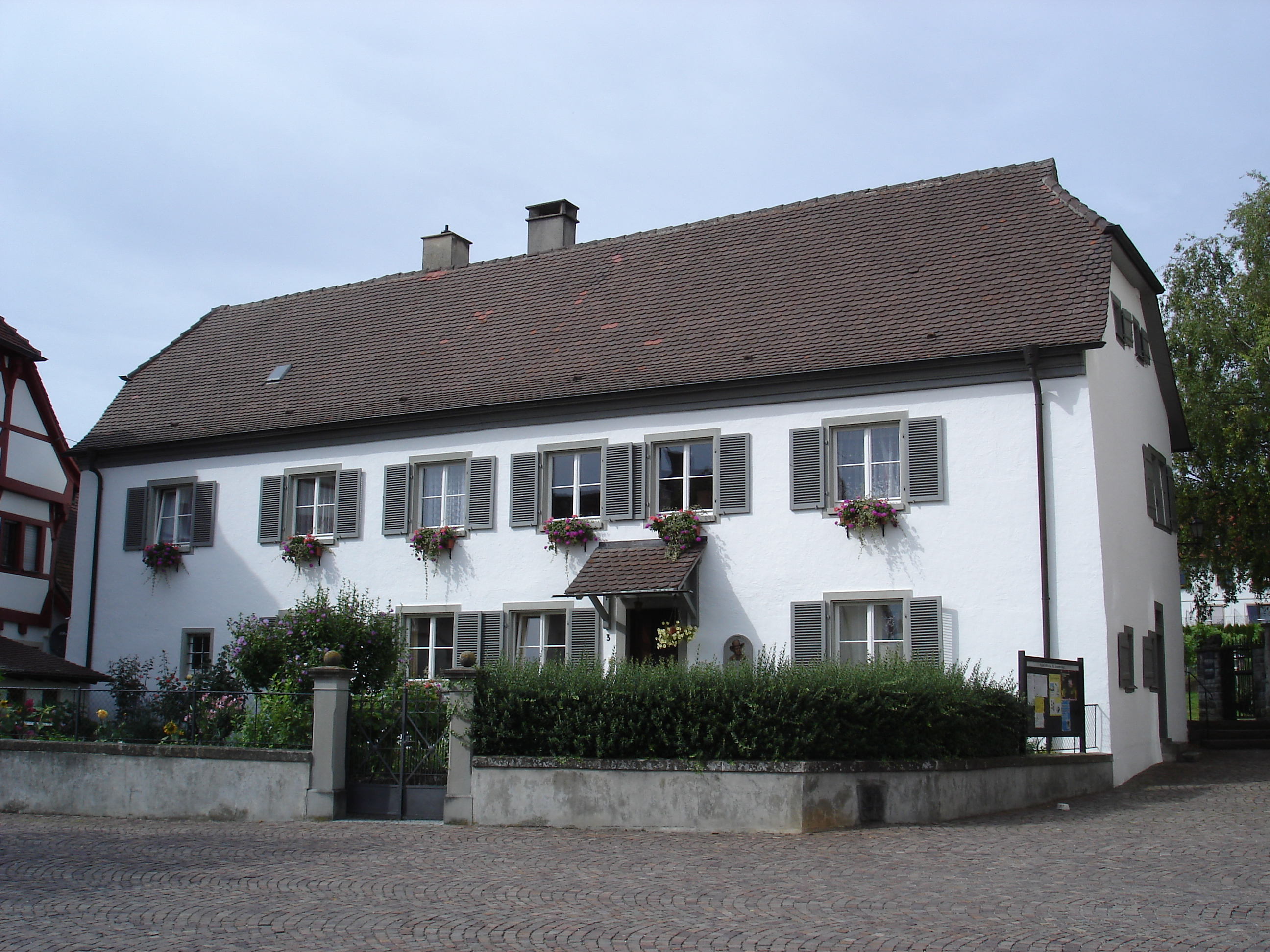
Hansjakob's house in Hagnau am Bodensee

On 1 December 1869, the suffragan bishop, Lothar von Kübel, moved him at his own request to Hagnau am Bodensee. From 1869 to 1883 he was the Catholic pastor in Hagnau am Bodensee. As the "water doctor by the lake" he counselled patients on moderation in their lives, on the moderate use of water and compresses. The cultivation of wine in Hagnau was threatened by part-time farming, infestation by mildew and the freezing over of Lake Constance during the winter of 1879/1880. As result on 20 October 1881, Hansjakob founded the Hagnau Vintner's Society and thus helped to save the rich tradition of viticulture by Lake Constance. The society was the first winemaking cooperative in Baden. Even today they still portray a picture of Hansjakobs in their logo. From 1871 to 1881 he was also a member of parliament in the Catholic People's Party in the Landtag of Baden. In 1873 he was imprisoned for six weeks in Radolfzell for slandering a state official. In the same year, his first son was born, whereupon Hansjakob called on a neurologist. There were supposed to be four children born out of wedlock. In the years, 1874 to 1879, he travelled to France, Italy, Austria, Belgium and the Netherlands. In 1878, he fell out with his political party.

=== Pastor in Freiburg in Breisgau ===
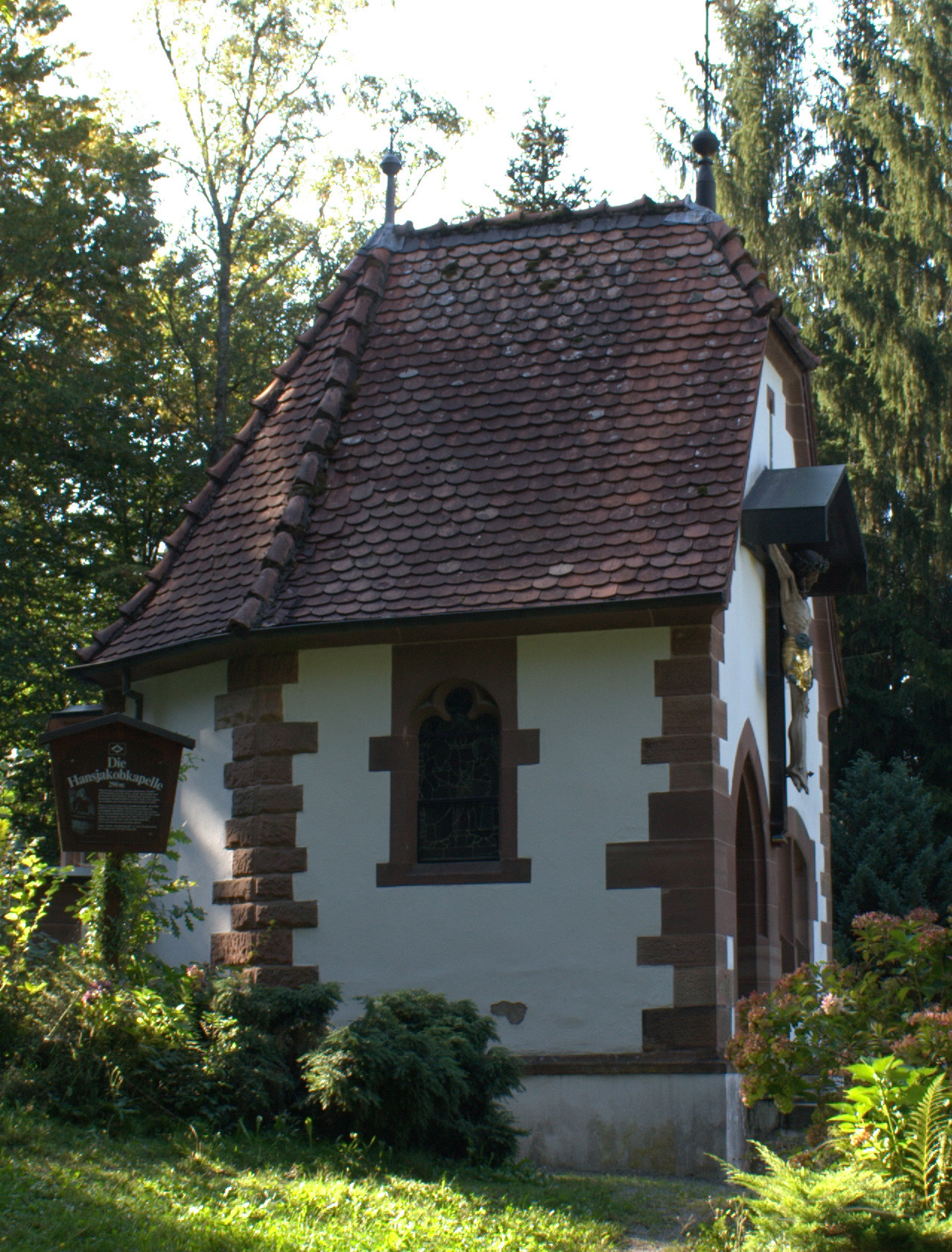
Hansjakob Chapel in Hofstetten

In 1884 he took up the post of pastor of St. Martin's Church in Freiburg, which he held until 1913, despite quarrels with the church authorities.

Hansjakob had a predisposition to nervous disorders and suffered from mood swings. In 1894, he went for treatment to Illenau sanatorium near Achern for several months. He fought his bouts of depression with opiates.

From 1897, he lived in the former Freiburg Charterhouse, which at that time had already become a Pfrundhaus, a rest and living home for 200 prebendaries (Pfründner), i.e. pensioners who, thanks to a legacy, had received the right to retire and be cared for.

=== Freihof in Haslach ===
After retiring, he had the Freihof in his home town of Haslach built in the shape of a farmhouse. He lived there from 22 October 1913 until his death on 23 June 1916. The Freihof was preserved as a museum.

Heinrich Hansjakob died on 23 June 1916 at the age of 78 in the place of his birth. He was interred in the crypt of his funerary chapel built by his good friend and architect, Max Meckel, and the sculptor, Joseph Dettlinger, in nearby Hofstetten.

== Literature ==
(alphabetical by authors)

- Andreas Beck: Hansjakob. Gedanken über sein Leiden. Heinrich-Hansjakob-Gesellschaft, Freiburg.
- Helmut Bender: Hansjakob und Freiburg. Waldkirch: Waldkircher Verlagsgesellschaft 1986. (= Badische Reihe; 17) ISBN 3-87885-123-5
  - Der Volksschriftsteller Heinrich Hansjakob. Marginalien zu einem Schwarzwälder Original. Waldkirch: Waldkircher-Verl. 1990. ISBN 978-3-87407-930-3
- Heinz Bischof: Anekdoten um Hansjakob. Kehl u.a.: Morstadt 1981. ISBN 3-88571-033-1
- Joachim Faller (2004). "Heinrich Hansjakob". In Bautz, Traugott (ed.). Biographisch-Bibliographisches Kirchenlexikon (BBKL) (in German). Vol. 23. Nordhausen: Bautz. cols. 611–617. ISBN 3-88309-155-3.
- Oswald Floeck: Heinrich Hansjakob. Ein Bild seines geistigen Entwicklungsganges und Schrifttums. Karlsruhe u.a.: Gutsch 1921.
- Hansjakob-Verlag der Stadt Haslach (publ.): Dr. Heinrich Hansjakob, Pfarrer, Politiker, Schriftsteller. Ein kurzer Abriss seines Lebens. EH-Druck, 77716 Haslach, 2000.
- Hans Heid: Heinrich Hansjakob und Rastatt. Waldkirch: Waldkircher Verl.-Ges. 1995. (= Stadtgeschichtliche Reihe / Stadt Rastatt; 1) ISBN 3-87885-304-1
- Manfred Hildenbrand: Heinrich Hansjakob - Rebell im Priesterrock. 3rd edn. Haslach: Hansjakob-Verl. der Stadt Haslach, 2002. (= Publications of the Haslach Municipal Archives; 2) ISBN 3-935182-16-3
  - Heinrich Hansjakob (1837–1916). Festschrift zum 150. Geburtstag. Haslach: self-publication by the town of Haslach i.K. 1987.
  - with Peter Schäfer (ed.): Hansjakob. Mit Gänsekiel und Tintenfass. Ausgewählte Briefe. Heinrich-Hansjakob-Gesellschaft, Freiburg, 2013.
- Josef Hoben: Heinrich Hansjakob (1837–1916). Der Rebell in der Soutane. Uhldingen: de scriptum, Pressedienst für Literatur, Geschichte, Kunst, 1994. (= Literatur der Euregio; 1)
- Artur J. Hofmann: Hansjakob und der badische Kulturkampf. Kehl u.a.: Morstadt, 1981. ISBN 3-88571-040-4
- Johann K. Kempf: Heinrich Hansjakob. Sein Leben, Wirken und Dichten. Stuttgart: Bonz 1917.
- Kurt Klein: Heinrich Hansjakob. Ein Leben für das Volk. 2. erw. Aufl. Kehl: Morstadt, 1980. ISBN 3-88571-008-0
- Heinrich Lehmann, Peter Schäfer (Hrsg.): Heinrich Hansjakob: Aus meinem Tagebuch, 1878 („Hagnauer Tagebuch“). Verlag der Heinrich-Hansjakob-Gesellschaft, Freiburg, 2011. ISBN
- Peter Schäfer: Heinrich-Hansjakob-Bibliographie. Freiburg im Breisgau: Heinrich-Hansjakob-Gesellschaft. 2002. ISBN 3-935182-17-1
- Adolf J. Schmid: Hansjakob und das Wolftal – Ein Lesebuch Apis-Verlag, Freiburg im Breisgau, 1992.
- Wilhelm Zentner (1966). "Hansjakob, Heinrich". Neue Deutsche Biographie (in German). Vol. 7. Berlin: Duncker & Humblot. pp. 636–637. (full text online).
