= Haslach im Kinzigtal =

- City
- Coat of arms

- Location of Haslach im Kinzigtal within Ortenaukreis district
- Interactive map of Haslach im Kinzigtal
- Location within Germany Location within Baden-Württemberg
- Coordinates: 48°16′40″N 08°05′13″E
- Country: Germany
- State: Baden-Württemberg
- Admin. region: Freiburg
- District: Ortenaukreis

Government
  - Mayor (2017–25): Philipp Saar

Area
  - Total: 18.67 km^{2} (7.21 sq mi)
- Elevation: 217 m (712 ft)

Population (2025-12-31)
  - Total: 7,189
  - Density: 385.1/km^{2} (997.3/sq mi)
- Time zone: UTC+01:00 (CET)
  - Summer (DST): UTC+02:00 (CEST)
- Postal codes: 77716
- Dialling codes: 07832
- Vehicle registration: OG, BH, KEL, LR, WOL
- Website: www.haslach.de

Haslach im Kinzigtal (German pronunciation: [ˈhaslax ʔɪm ˈkɪntsɪçˌtaːl], lit. 'Haslach in the Kinzig valley'; Low Alemannic: Haaslä) is a small city in the Black Forest in the district Ortenaukreis, Baden-Württemberg in south-western Germany. In 2015, it comprised a population of 6,893 inhabitants.

Haslach is a member of the "Deutsche Fachwerkstraße", an association of German cities with examples of the traditional vernacular timber-framed houses.

== History ==
The first documentary mention as "Haselahe" dates from 1240.

Haslach earliest proven settlements date back to Roman times. Roman Age finds (pottery shards, stone altar, Roman grave relief) indicate the presence of a settlement here at the time of the construction of a military road through the Kinzig valley (about 74 A.D.). Archaeological finds indicate a Roman road station.

Haslach experienced its first heyday in the 13th century when the town, seat of the mountain judge, became the center of an important silver mining area. From the 17th century, Haslach continued to develop as a market town. Its market streets and squares, which were wide for the time, have been completely preserved to this day and, together with the narrow residential and craft alleys, give the picturesque old town, which consists almost exclusively of baroque half-timbered houses, a unique flair.

After the decline of silver mining in the 16th century, Haslach developed further as an official and market town. In the War of Spanish Succession, it was completely burned down in 1704. Oriented at the medieval town plan, the city then emerged relatively modern timber-framed buildings in southern German baroque style.

During the last months of World War II (September 1944–April 1945), Haslach had three sub-camps of the concentration camp Natzweiler-Struthof at the volcano near the city. Reason for the establishment of the camp was the relocation of production of several arms factories in the bombproof tunnels of the mine Hartsteinwerke volcano. The Vulkan Memorial in Haslach commemorates the 1,700 prisoners from 21 countries who were forced to do labour work. More than 223 inmates known by name lost their lives in Haslach. Others were secretly buried in the vicinity of the camp.

On September 15, 1978, the old town of Haslach was placed under a preservation order by the Freiburg Regional Council. This ordinance serves to preserve the appearance of the old town of Haslach, which is still characterised by its medieval floor plan, within its historical limits.

== Culture ==
=== Annual festivities ===
- Star singing (Sternesingen): Every evening from January 1 to 6, children dress up as Biblical Magi, accompanied by "Sterndriller" and singers and parade through the city and perform Haslach Christmas Carols, a local collection of Christmas, Shepherd and Epiphany songs in front of every house.
- Day of the stork (Storchentag): February 22 has been "Storchentag" in Haslach for centuries. The possible origin of this usage is the fulfillment of a vow made by the Haslacher on the occasion of a vermin plague in the 17th century.
- Allemanic Carnival (Fastnacht): Haslach is one of the strongholds of the Alemannic Carnival. It is organised by the fools' guild that dates back to 1860. The typical Haslach carnival figures include the knapsack guard (many Haslachers say "Fässlemänner"), the Haselnarros and Schellenhansel.
- Scheibenschlagen: Scheibenschlagen is an old Alemannic spring custom. It takes place on the fourth Sunday of Lent (Alemannic: "Lätare"). As darkness falls, a mighty fire blazes and the single young men practice "hitting" the glowing wooden discs. At the end, a mighty, straw-wrapped fire wheel rolls down into the valley.
- Palm Sunday (Palmsonntag): On Palm Sunday, large and small palm trees and palm stalks are brought to the church. These are decorated with box, tuja and holly as well as with colored paper and receive their blessing before entering the church.
- Herbal consecration (Kräuterweihe): On August 15, the feast of the Assumption of Mary, the "herb clump", a structure made of many herbs, garden onions and ears of grain, is blessed during the church services. The "herb clump" is then stored in the house as protection against illness and danger.
- Shepherds' singing (Hirtensingen): Usually on the day before New Year's Eve, shepherds' manners and poems are recited against the backdrop of a stable. The "Duweschneck", a Christmas bread from Haslach, is served with mulled wine.

=== Museums ===
==== The Hansjakob museum (Freihof) ====
Heinrich Hansjakob (1837–1916) was a pastor in Hagnau (Lake Constance), where he founded the first Baden winegrowers' cooperative. As a member of the Baden state parliament in Karlsruhe, he was an active politician for 10 years, but he was best known as a writer. Hansjakob has published more than 70 books. He offers an excellent insight into his literary work as an observer of the farmers, craftsmen, citizens and traders of the Baden Black Forest in the 19th century, but also into his work as a historian, publicist, politician and writer. His manuscripts and letters are kept in the Hansjakob archive.

== Famous people ==
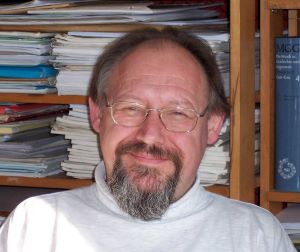
Xaver Paul Thoma, 2005

- Heinrich Hansjakob (1837–1916), catholic priest, politician and native writer
- Ernst Engelberg (1909–2010), university professor and Marxist historian.
- Bruno Lenz (1911–2006), painter and violinist.
- Horst Prinzbach (1931–2012), chemist and emeritus professor of University of Lausanne and University of Freiburg
- Xaver Paul Thoma (born 1953), composer of contemporary music, violist and music educator.
- Martin Herrmann, (DE Wiki) (born 1966), chef, awarded two stars in the Michelin Guide
- Marion Gentges (born 1971), politician
- Anita Schätzle (born 1981), wrestler and Olympian participant

== Photo gallery ==
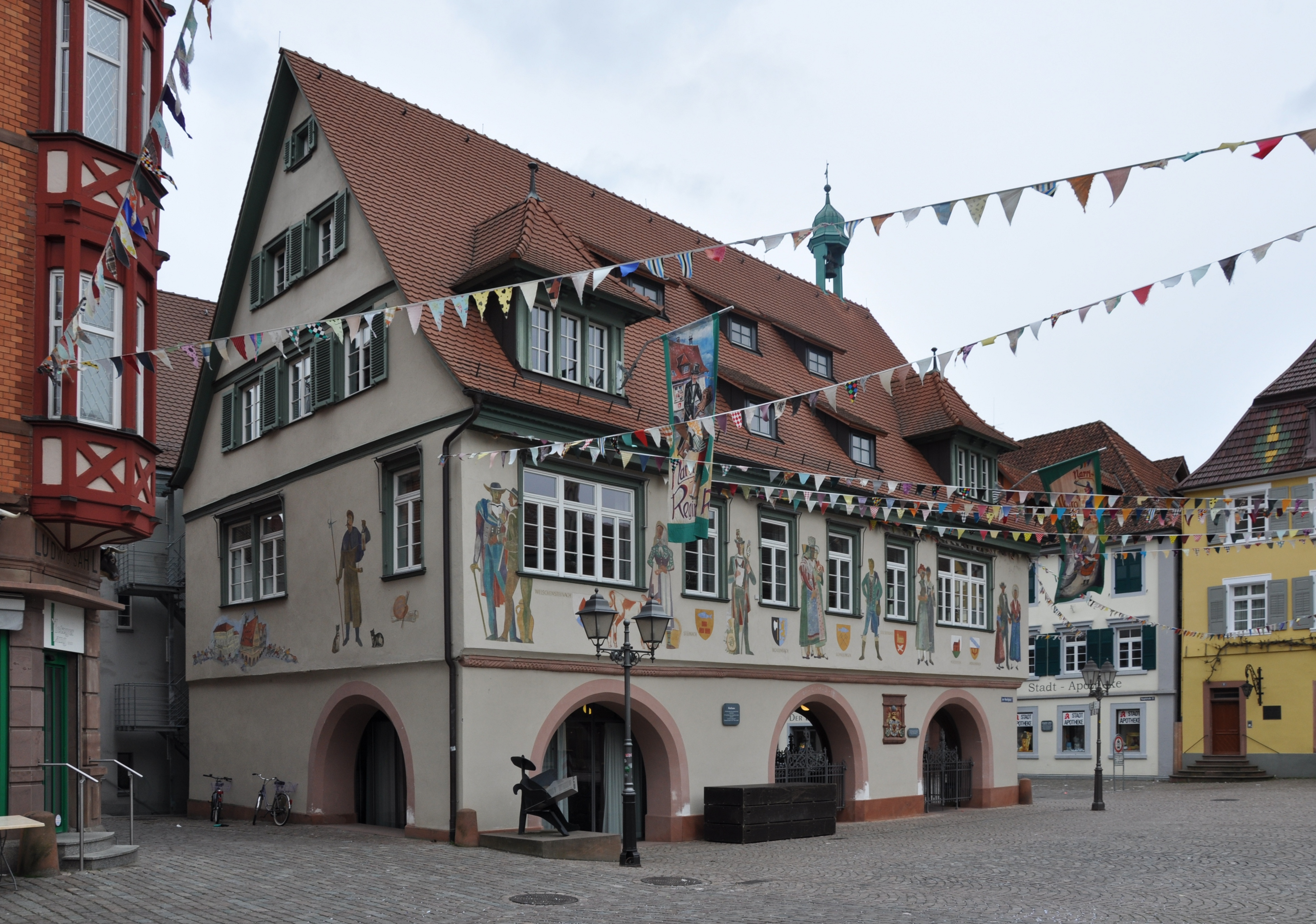
The city's town hall

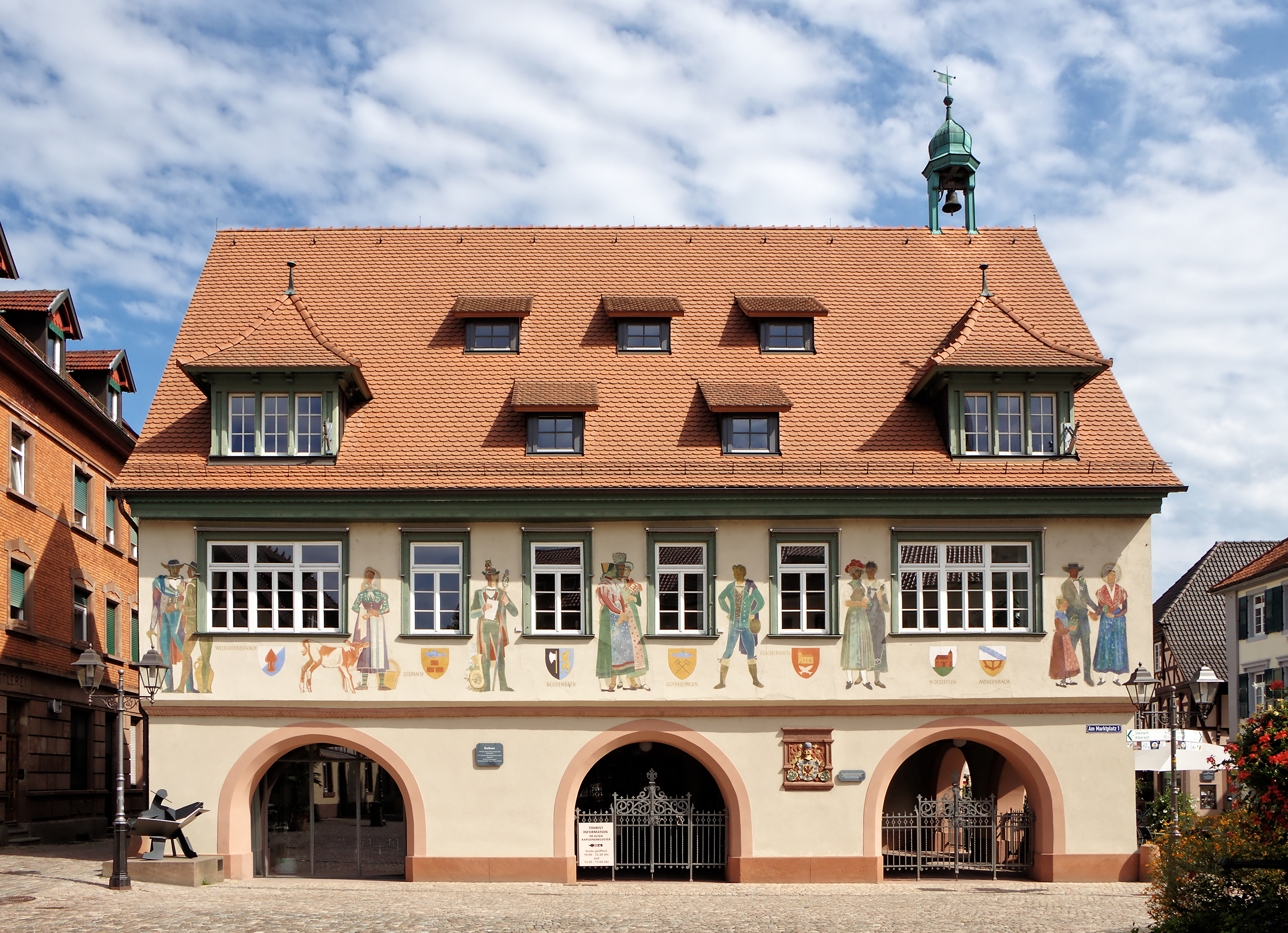
The city's town hall

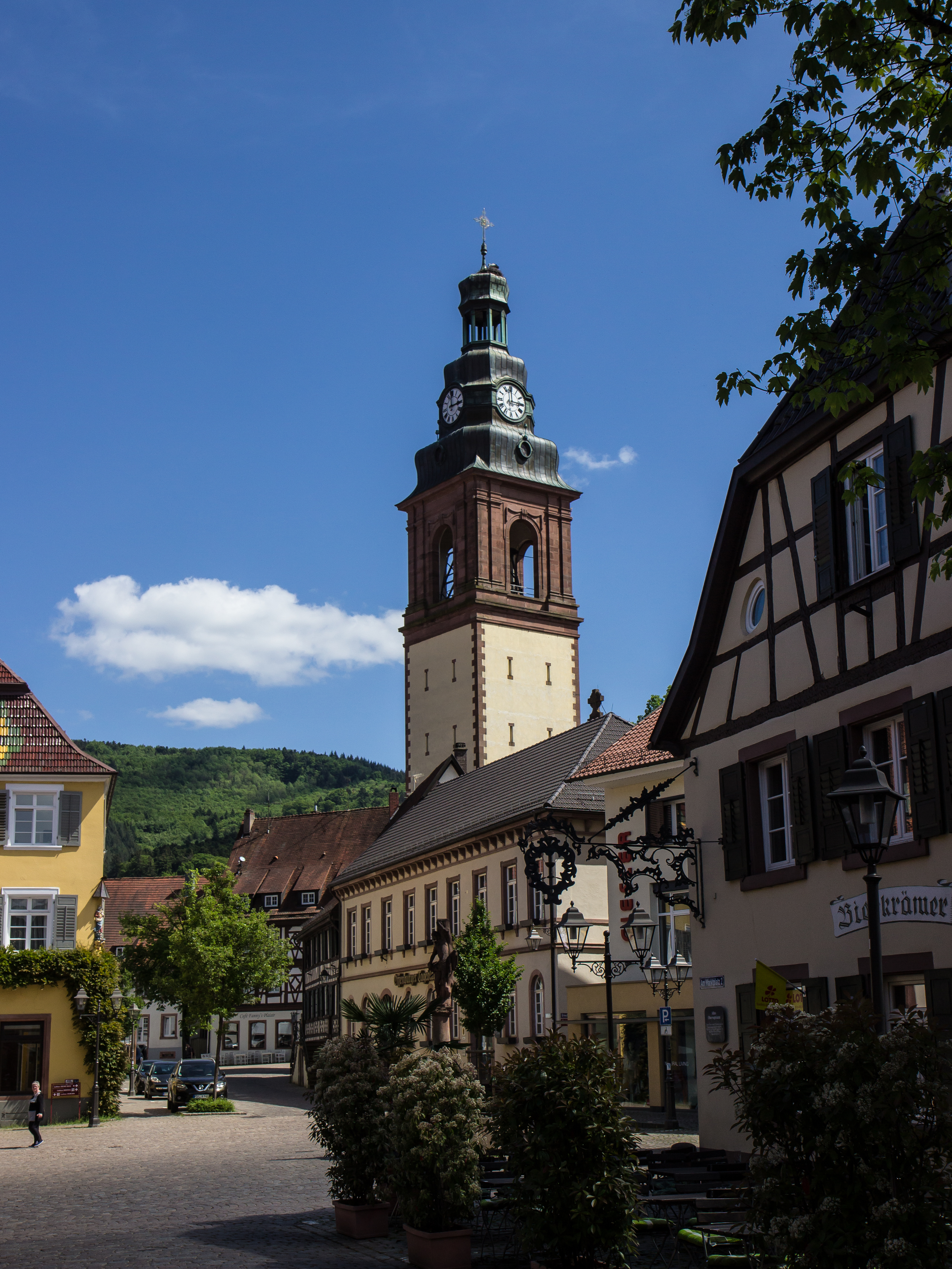
Catholic church St. Arbogast

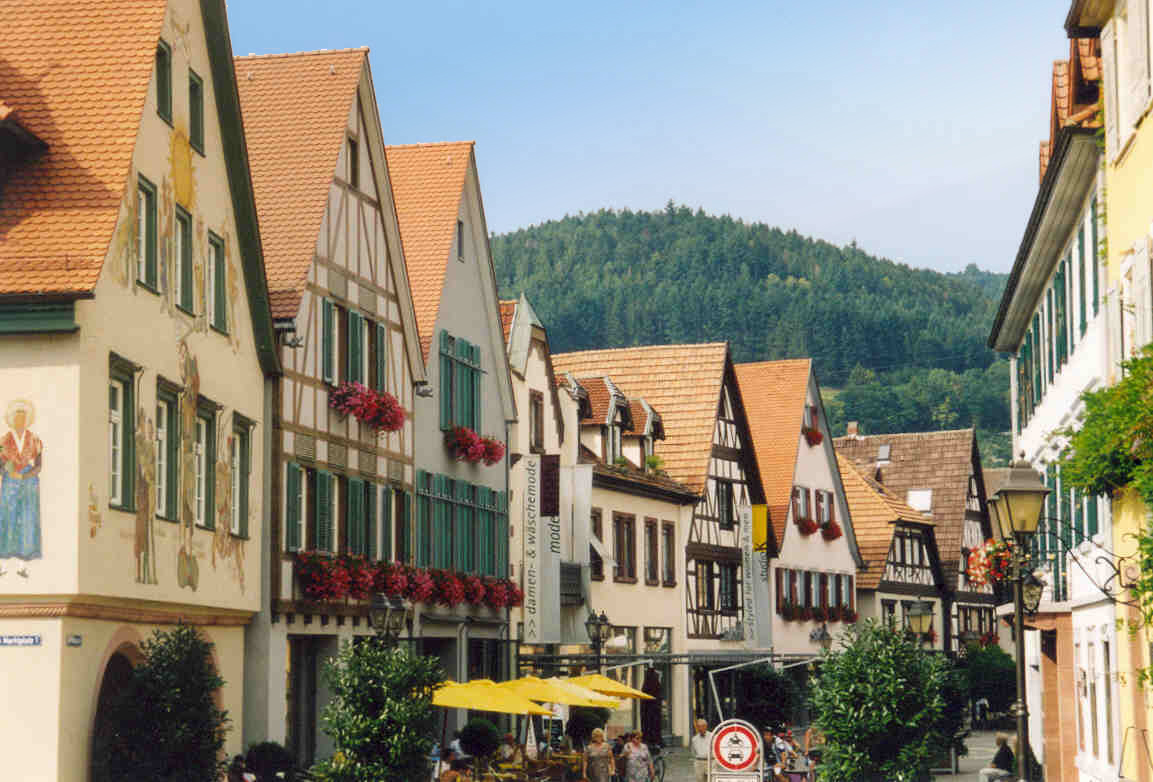
Haslach city centre

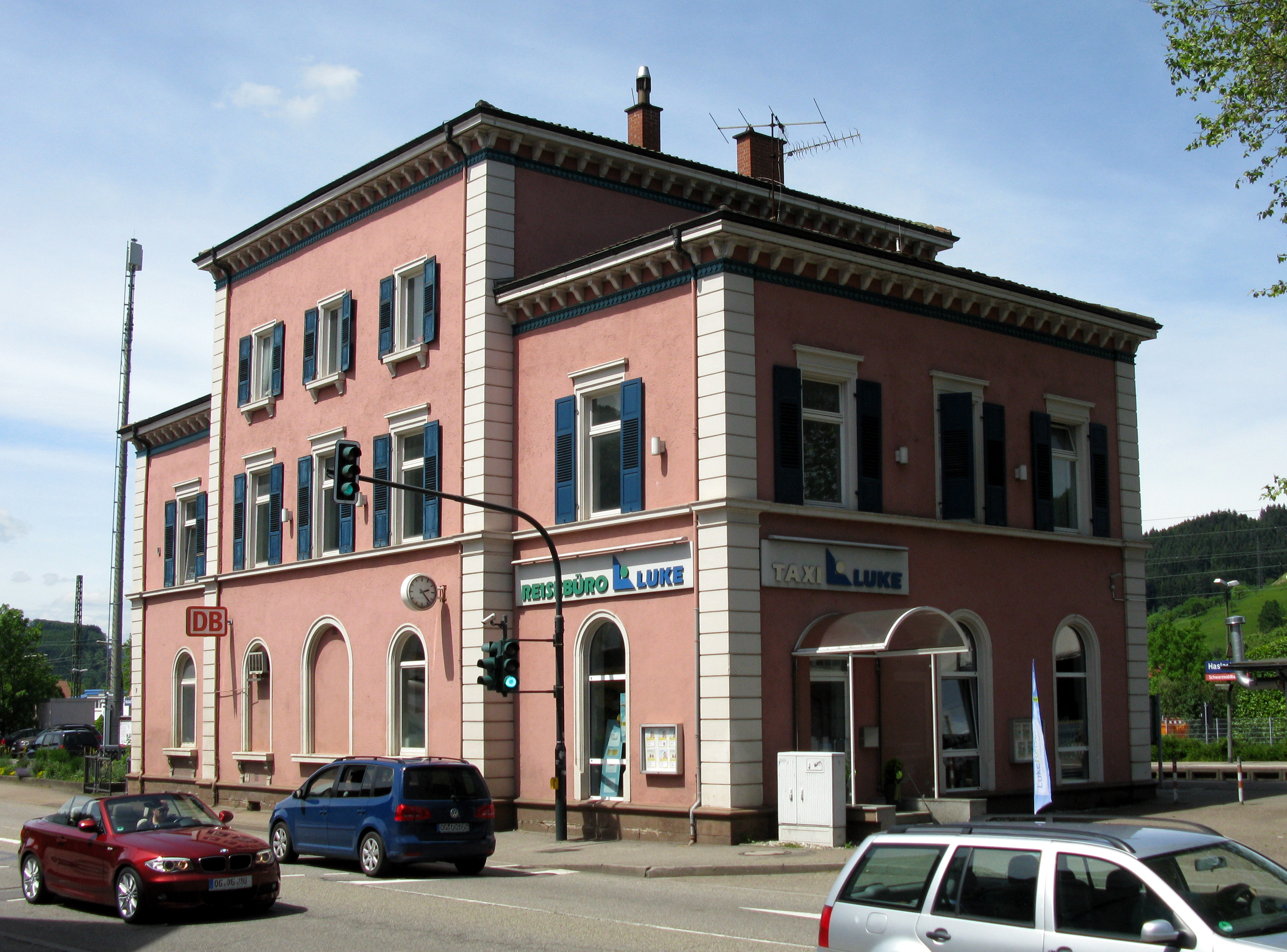
Train station

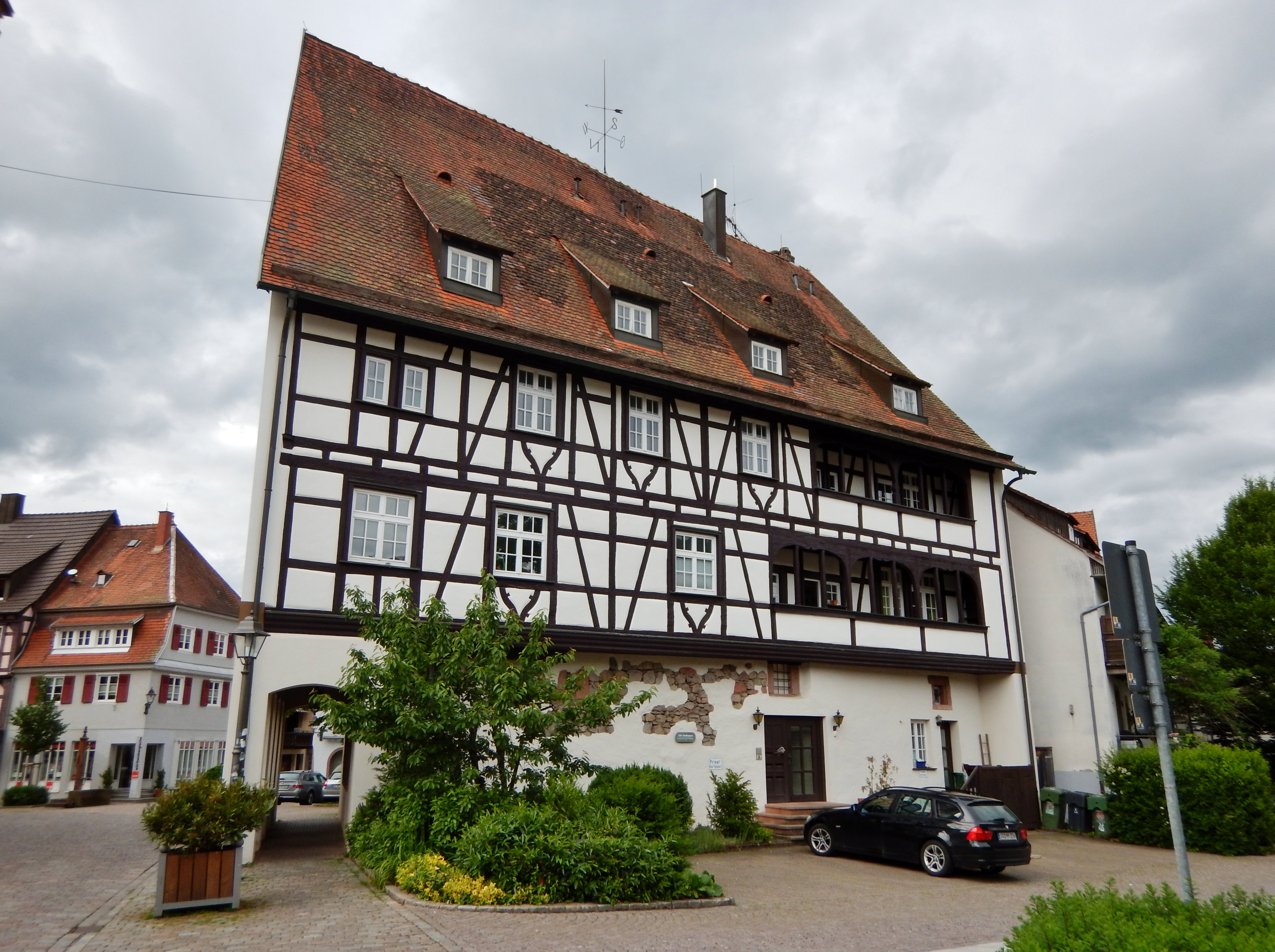
Fachwerkhaus (half-timbered style) in Haslach

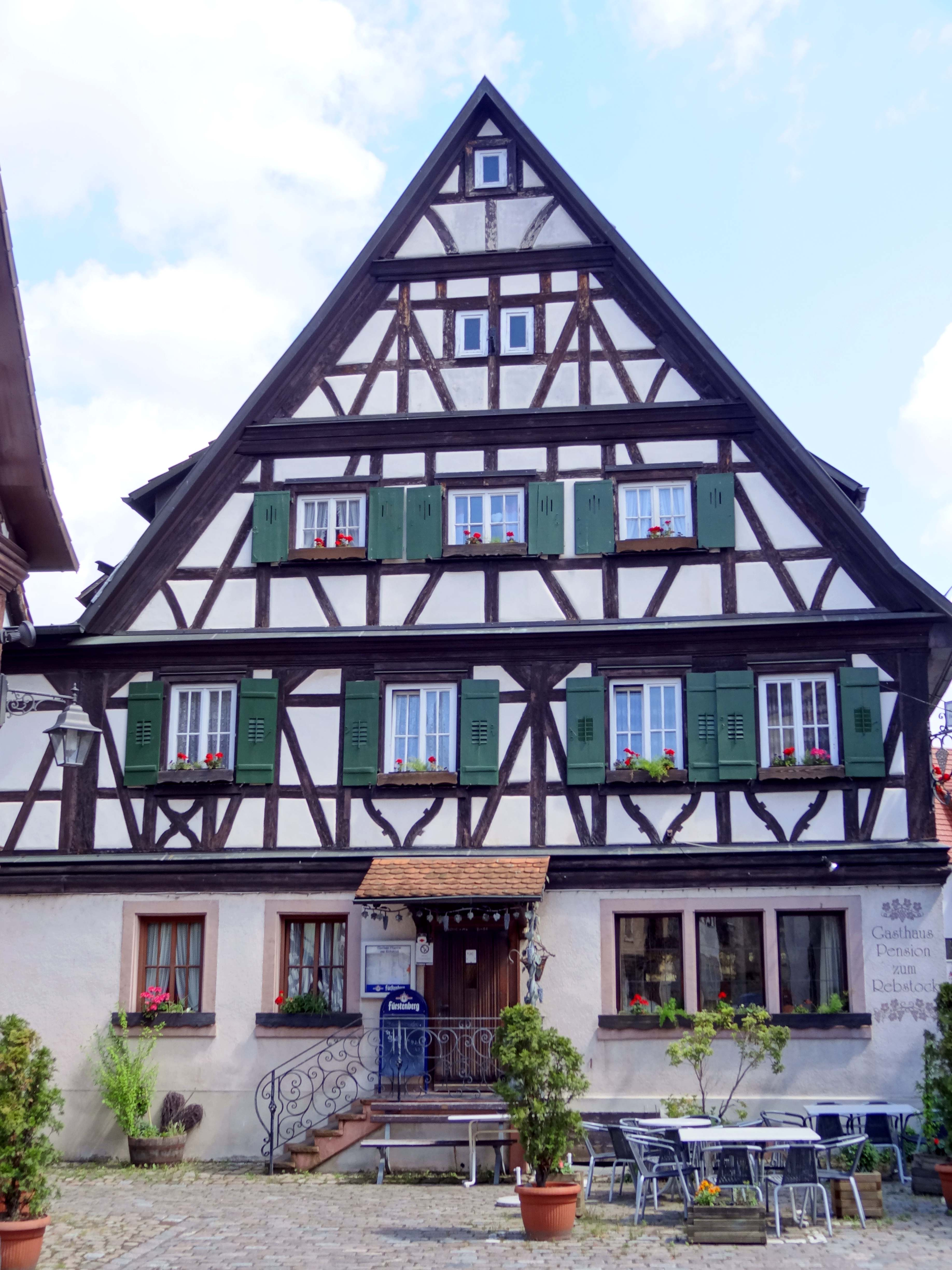
House in the Fachwerk half-timbered style

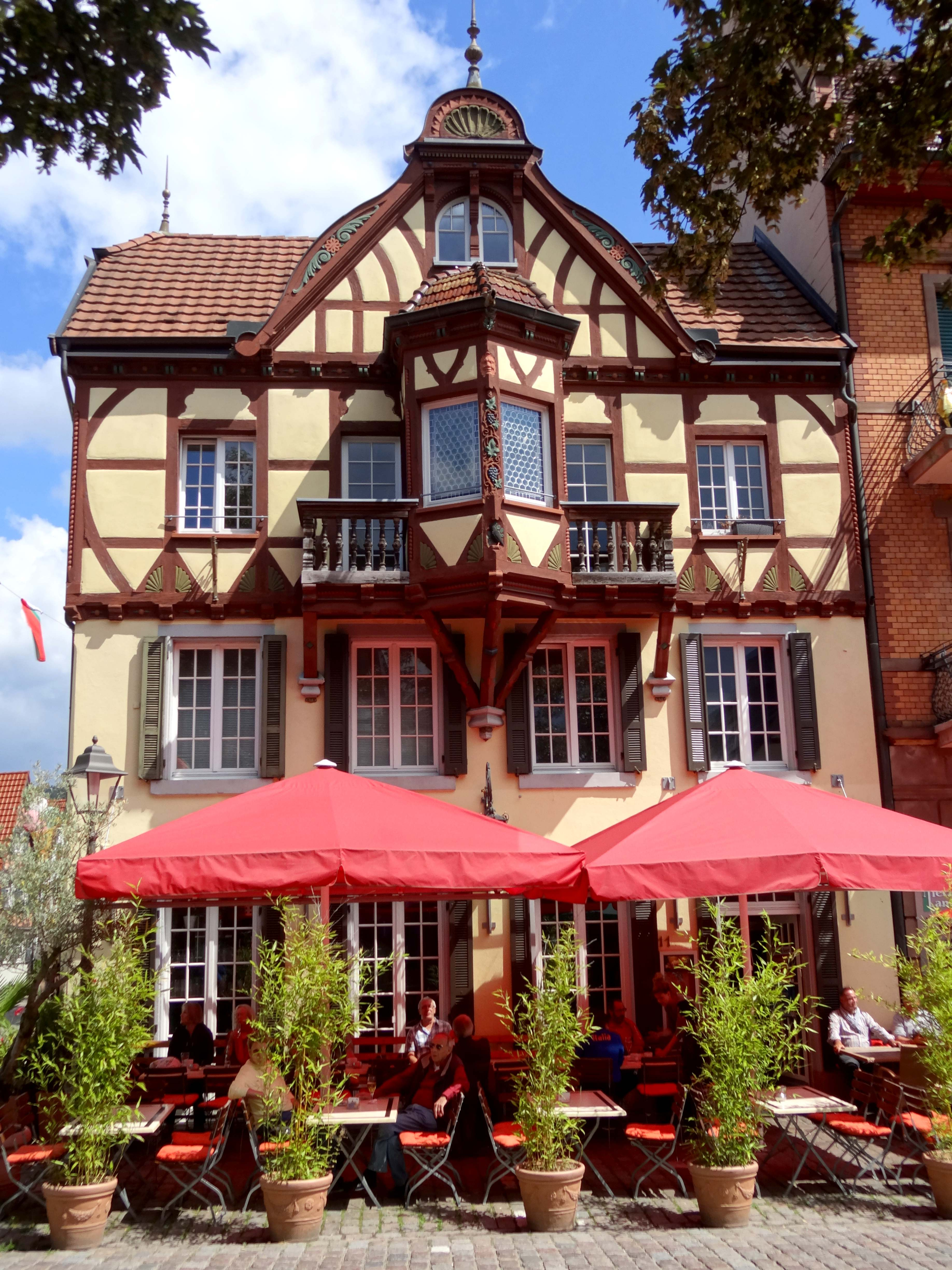
House in the Fachwerk half-timbered style

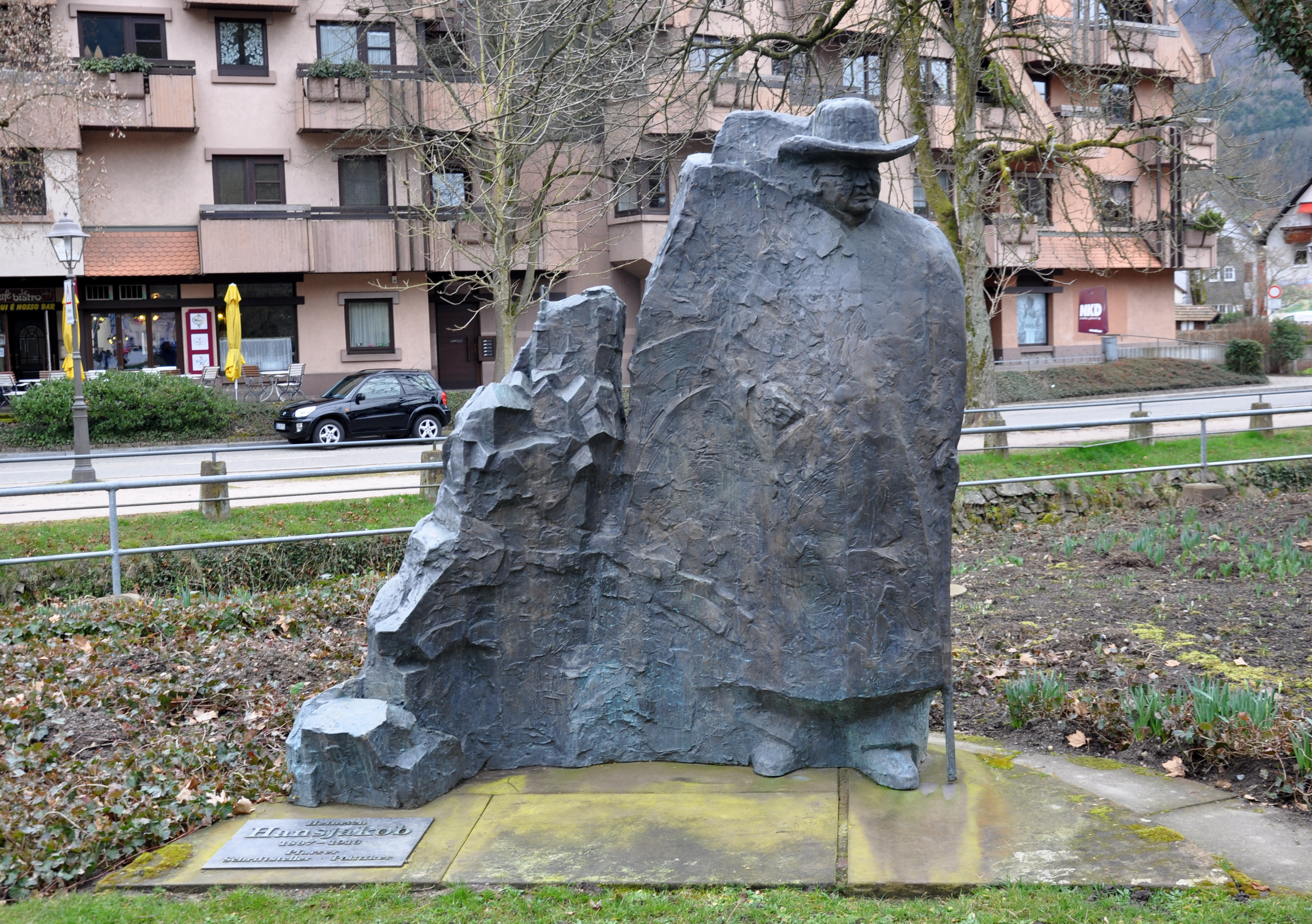
Hansjakob memorial
