= Oberharmersbach =

- Municipality
- Coat of arms

- Location of Oberharmersbach within Ortenaukreis district
- Interactive map of Oberharmersbach
- Location within Germany Location within Baden-Württemberg
- Coordinates: 48°22′27″N 8°7′41″E
- Country: Germany
- State: Baden-Württemberg
- Admin. region: Freiburg
- District: Ortenaukreis

Government
  - Mayor (2017–25): Richard Weith

Area
  - Total: 40.92 km^{2} (15.80 sq mi)
- Elevation: 303 m (994 ft)

Population (2025-12-31)
  - Total: 2,405
  - Density: 58.77/km^{2} (152.2/sq mi)
- Time zone: UTC+01:00 (CET)
  - Summer (DST): UTC+02:00 (CEST)
- Postal codes: 77784
- Dialling codes: 07837
- Vehicle registration: OG, BH, KEL, LR, WOL
- Website: www.oberharmersbach.de

Oberharmersbach (Low Alemannic: Haamerschbach) is a town in the district of Ortenau in Baden-Württemberg in Germany

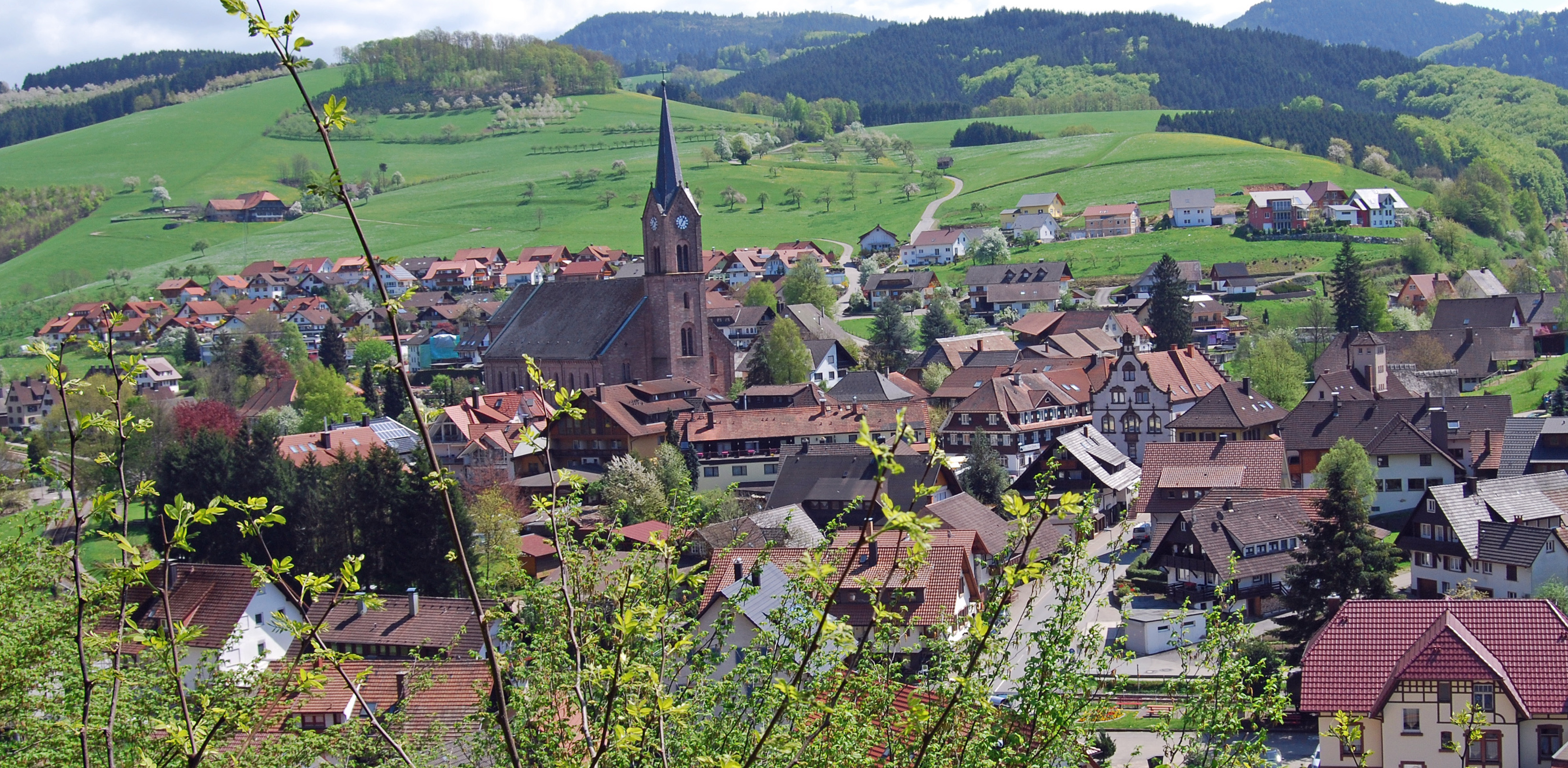
Oberharmersbach

== Demographics ==
Population development:

Year	Inhabitants
1990	2,543
2001	2,594
2011	2,487
2021	2,442
