= Black Forest =

Mountain range in Germany

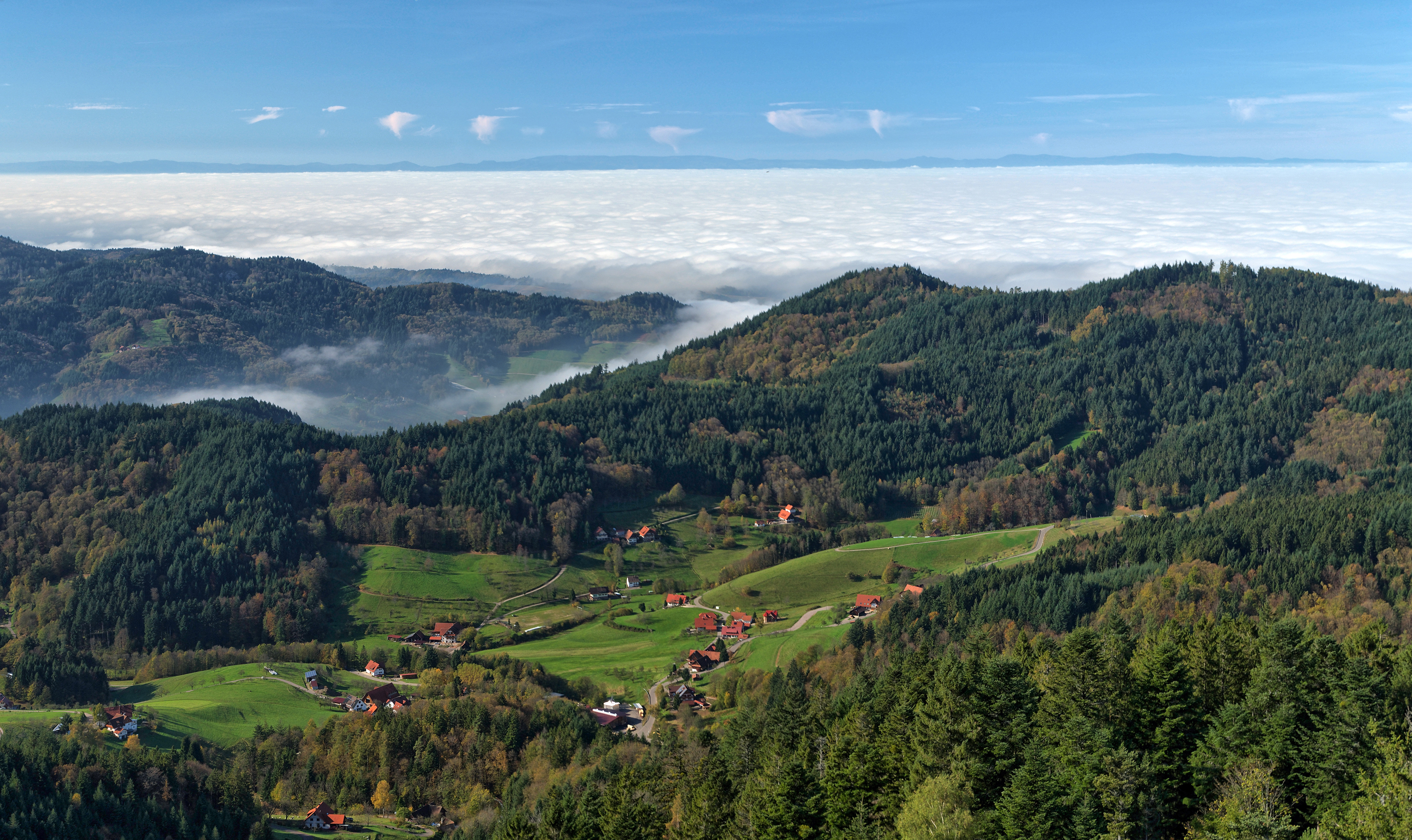
- View from the Hohfelsen near Seebach

Highest point
- Peak: Feldberg
- Elevation: 1,493 m (4,898 ft)
- Coordinates: 47°52′43″N 8°0′40″E

Dimensions
- Length: 160 km (99 mi)
- Area: 6,000 km^{2} (2,300 mi^{2})

Geography
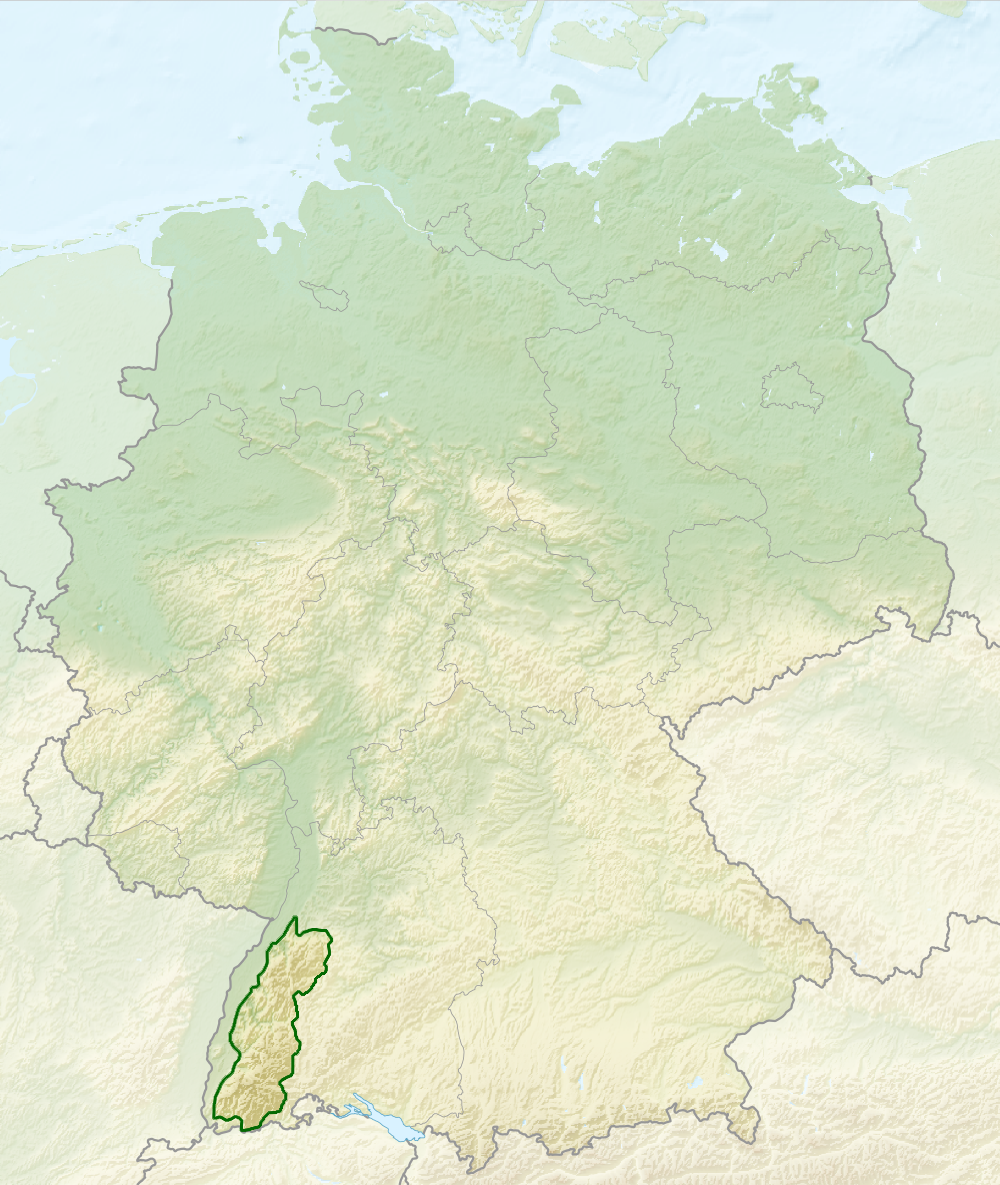
- Map of Germany with the Black Forest outlined in green
- Country: Germany
- State: Baden-Württemberg
- Range coordinates: 48.25°N 8.05°E
- Parent range: Southwest German Uplands/Scarplands

Geology
- Orogeny: Central Uplands
- Rock type(s): Gneiss, Bunter sandstone

The Black Forest (German: Schwarzwald [ˈʃvaʁtsvalt]) is a large forested mountain range in the state of Baden-Württemberg in southwest Germany, bounded by the Rhine Valley to the west and south and close to the borders with France and Switzerland. It is the source of the Danube and Neckar rivers.

The area is roughly oblong in shape, with a length of 160 kilometres (100 miles) and breadth of up to 50 km (30 mi), it has an area of about 6,009 km^{2} (2,320 mi^{2}). Its highest peak is the Feldberg with an elevation of 1,493 metres (4,898 ft) above sea level.

Historically, the area was known for forestry and the mining of ore deposits, but tourism has now become the primary industry, accounting for around 300,000 jobs. There are several ruined military fortifications dating back to the 17th century.

== History ==
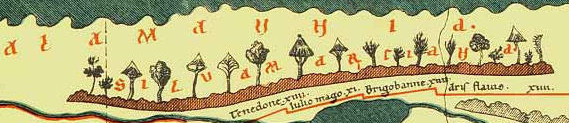
The Black Forest on the Tabula Peutingeriana: a mountain chain with fantastically formed trees as a symbol of an unsettled and virtually inaccessible terrain

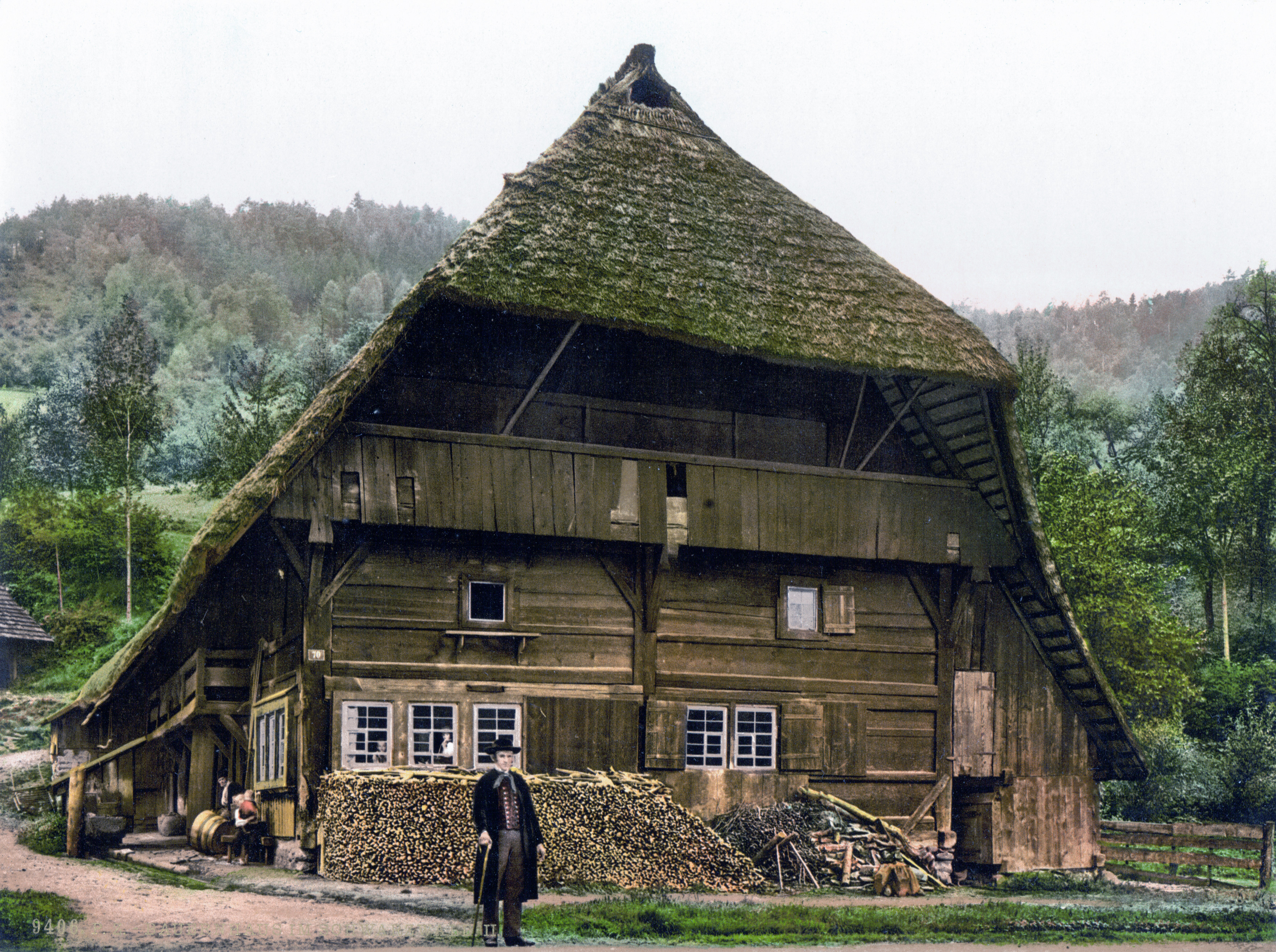
Black Forest farmhouse, 1898

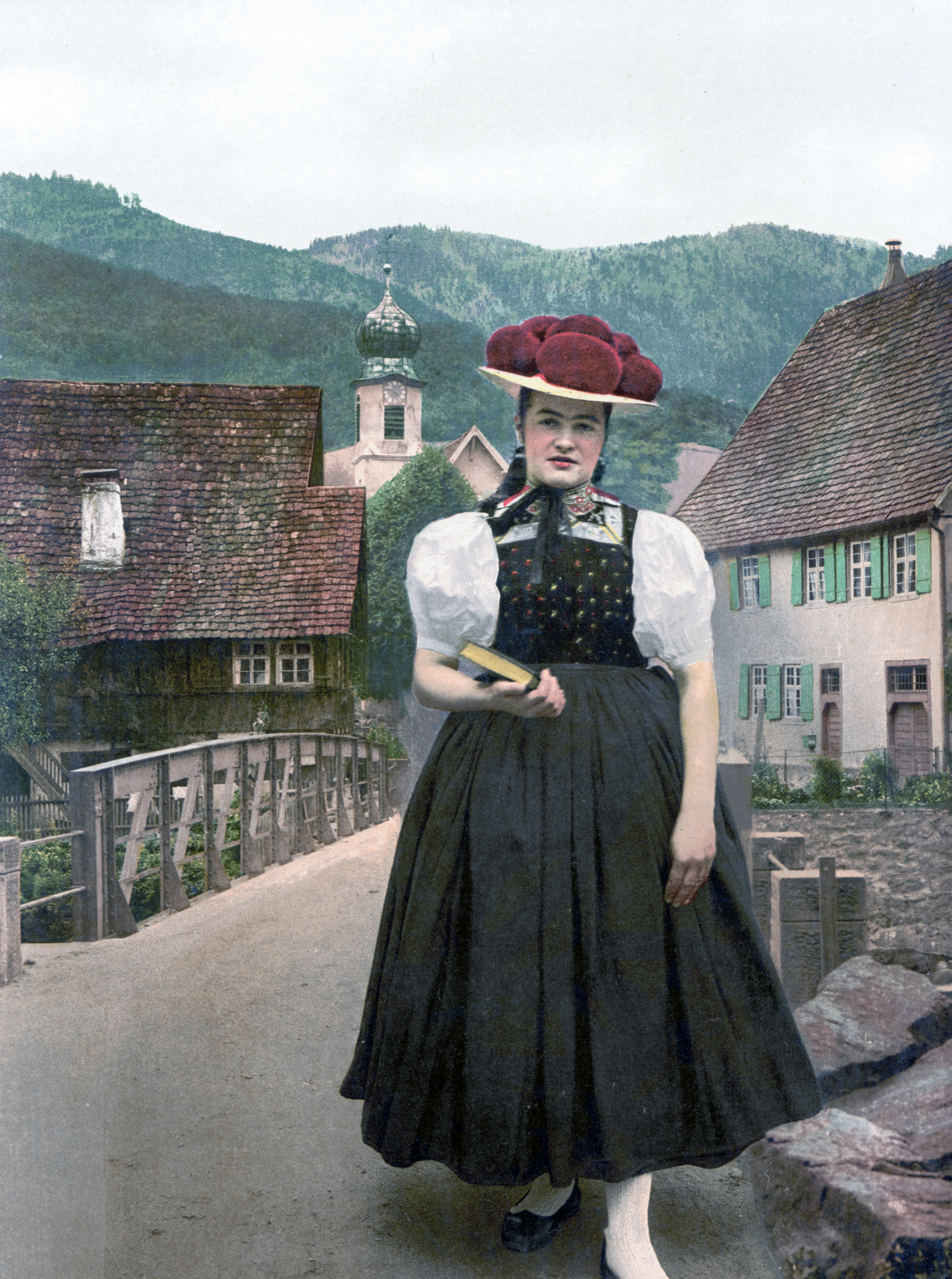
An unmarried Black Forest woman wearing a red Bollenhut, 1898

In ancient times, the Black Forest was known as Abnoba mons, after the Celtic deity Abnoba. In Roman times (Late antiquity), it was given the name Silva Marciana ("Marcynian Forest", from the Germanic word marka, "border"). The Black Forest probably represented the border area of the Marcomanni ("border people") who were settled east of the Roman limes. They, in turn, were part of the Germanic tribe of Suebi, who subsequently gave their name to the historic state of Swabia. With the exception of Roman settlements on the perimeter (e.g. the baths in Badenweiler, and mines near Badenweiler and Sulzburg) and the construction of the Roman road of Kinzigtalstraße, the colonization of the Black Forest was not carried out by the Romans but by the Alemanni. They settled and first colonized the valleys, crossing the old settlement boundary, the so-called "red sandstone border", for example, from the region of Baar. Soon afterwards, increasingly higher areas and adjacent forests were colonized, so that by the end of the 10th century, the first settlements could be found in the red (bunter) sandstone region. These include, for example, Rötenbach, which was first mentioned in 819.

Some of the uprisings (including the Bundschuh movement) that preceded the 16th century German Peasants' War, originated in the Black Forest. Further peasant unrest, in the shape of the saltpetre uprisings, took place over the next two centuries in Hotzenwald.

Remnants of military fortifications dating from the 17th and 18th centuries can be found in the Black Forest, especially on the mountain passes. Examples include the multiple baroque fieldworks of Margrave Louis William of Baden-Baden or individual defensive positions such as the Alexanderschanze (Alexander's Redoubt), the Röschenschanze and the Schwedenschanze (Swedish Redoubt).

Originally, the Black Forest was a mixed forest of deciduous trees and firs. At the higher elevations spruce also grew. In the middle of the 19th century, the Black Forest was almost completely deforested by intensive forestry and was subsequently replanted, mostly with spruce monocultures.

In 1990, extensive damage to the forest was caused by a series of windstorms. (Note: These severe storms or cyclones are commonly known as hurricanes even though they are not true tropical hurricanes.) On 26 December 1999, Cyclone Lothar raged across the Black Forest and caused even greater damage, especially to the spruce monocultures. As had happened following the 1990 storms, large quantities of fallen logs were kept in provisional wet-storage areas for years. The effects of the storm are demonstrated by the Lothar Path, a forest educational and adventure trail at the nature centre in Ruhestein on a highland timber forest of about 10 hectares that was destroyed by a hurricane. Several areas of storm damage, both large and small, were left to nature and have developed today into a natural mixed forest again.

== Geography ==
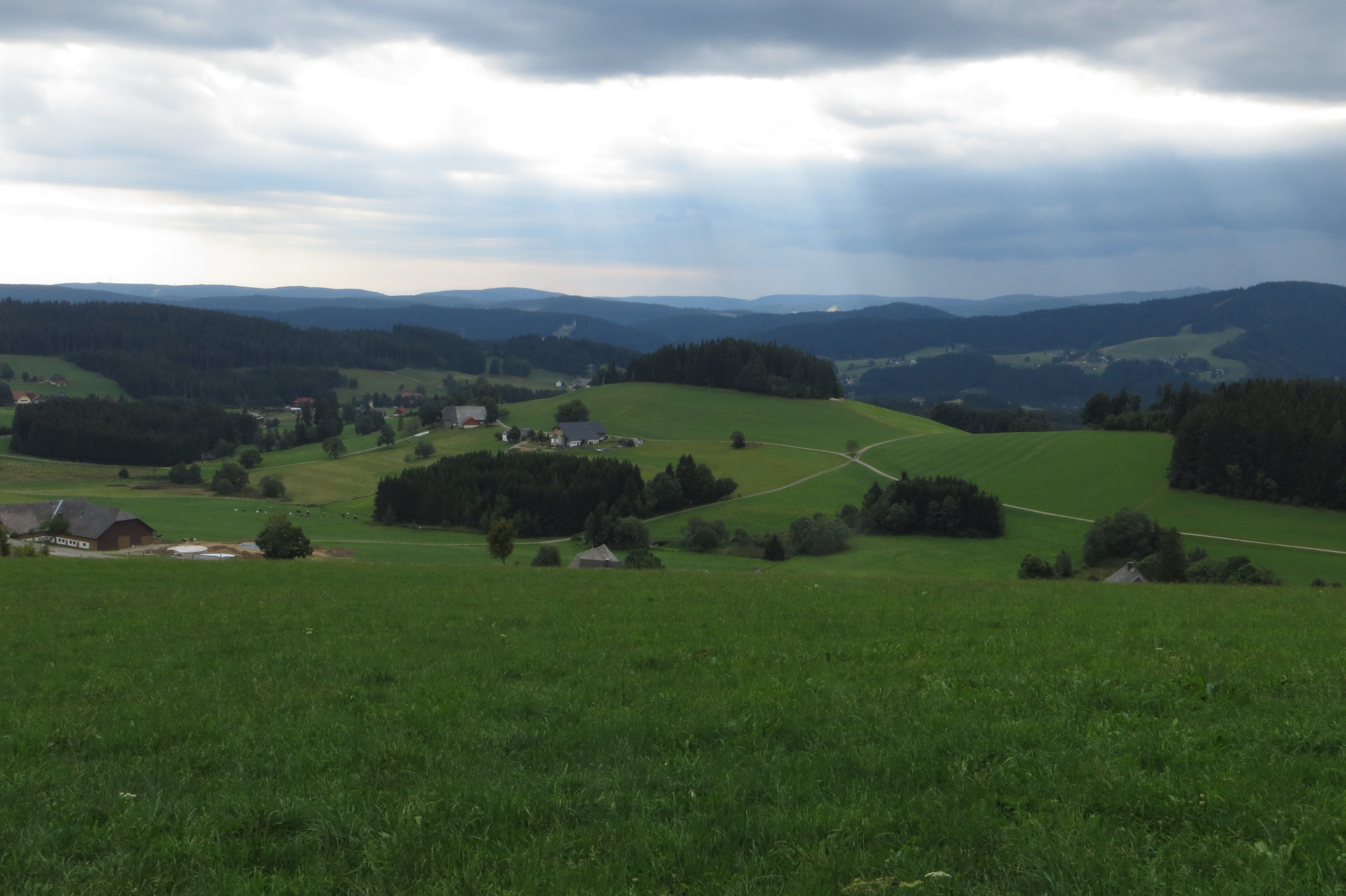
Woods and pastures of the High Black Forest near Breitnau

The Black Forest stretches from the High Rhine in the south to the Kraichgau in the north. In the west it is bounded by the Upper Rhine Plain (which, from a natural region perspective, also includes the low chain of foothills); in the east it transitions to the Gäu, Baar and hill country west of the Klettgau. From north to south, the Black Forest extends for over 160 km (100 mi), attaining a width of up to 50 km (30 mi) in the south and 30 km (20 mi) in the north. The Black Forest is the highest part of the South German Scarplands, and much of it is densely wooded, a fragment of the Hercynian Forest of antiquity.

Administratively, the Black Forest belongs completely to the state of Baden-Württemberg and comprises the cities of Freiburg, Pforzheim and Baden-Baden as well as the following districts (Kreise). In the north: Enz, Rastatt and Calw; in the middle: Freudenstadt, Ortenaukreis and Rottweil; in the south: Emmendingen, Schwarzwald-Baar, Breisgau-Hochschwarzwald, Lörrach and Waldshut.

=== Natural regions ===
The natural regions of the Black Forest are separated by various features.

Geomorphologically, the main division is between the gentle eastern slopes with their mostly rounded hills and broad plateaux (so-called Danubian relief, especially prominent in the north and east on the Bunter Sandstone) and the deeply incised, steeply falling terrain in the west that drops into the Upper Rhine Graben; the so-called Valley Black Forest (Talschwarzwald) with its Rhenanian relief. It is here, in the west, where the highest mountains and the greatest local differences in height (of up to 1000 metres) are found. The valleys are often narrow and ravine-like. The summits are rounded, and there are remnants of plateaux and arête-like landforms.

Geologically the clearest division is also between east and west. Large areas of the eastern Black Forest, the lowest layer of the South German Scarplands composed of Bunter Sandstone, are covered by seemingly endless coniferous forest with their island clearings. The exposed basement in the west, predominantly made up of metamorphic rocks and granites, was, despite its rugged topography, easier to settle and appears much more open and inviting today with its varied meadow valleys.

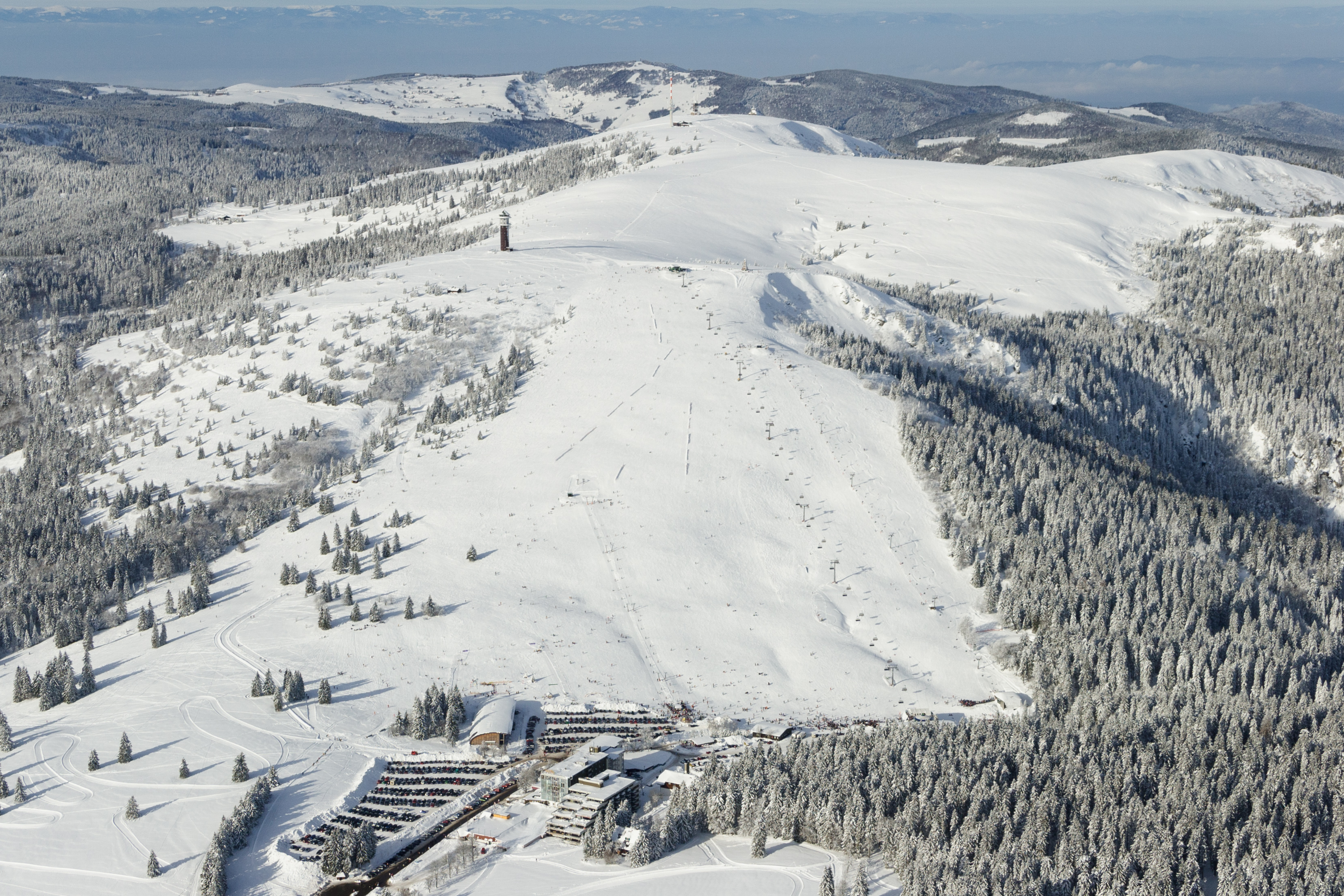
The Feldberg, the highest mountain in the Black Forest, south-east of Freiburg

The most common way of dividing the regions of the Black Forest is, however, from north to south. Until the 1930s, the Black Forest was divided into the Northern and Southern Black Forest, the boundary being the line of the Kinzig valley. Later the Black Forest was divided into the heavily forested Northern Black Forest, the lower, central section, predominantly used for agriculture in the valleys, was the Central Black Forest and the much higher Southern Black Forest with its distinctive highland economy and ice age glacial relief. The term High Black Forest referred to the highest areas of the South and southern Central Black Forest.

The boundaries drawn were, however, quite varied. In 1932, Robert Gradmann called the Central Black Forest the catchment area of the Kinzig and in the west the section up to the lower Elz and Kinzig tributary of the Gutach. A pragmatic division, which is oriented not just on natural and cultural regions, uses the most important transverse valleys. Based on that, the Central Black Forest is bounded by the Kinzig in the north and the line from Dreisam to Gutach in the south, corresponding to the Bonndorf Graben zone and the course of the present day B 31.

In 1959, Rudolf Metz combined the earlier divisions and proposed a modified tripartite division, which combined natural and cultural regional approaches and was widely used. His Central Black Forest is bounded in the north by the watershed between the Acher and Rench and subsequently between the Murg and Kinzig or Forbach and Kinzig, in the south by the Bonndorf Graben zone, which restricts the Black Forest in the east as does the Freudenstadt Graben further north by its transition into the Northern Black Forest.

==== Work of the Institute of Applied Geography ====
The Handbook of the Natural Region Divisions of Germany published by the Federal Office of Regional Geography (Bundesanstalt für Landeskunde) since the early 1950s names the Black Forest as one of six tertiary-level major landscape regions within the secondary-level region of the South German Scarplands and, at the same time, one of nine new major landscape unit groups. It is divided into six so-called major units (level 4 landscapes). This division was refined and modified in several successor publications (1:200,000 individual map sheets) up to 1967, each covering individual sections of the map. The mountain range was also divided into three regions. The northern boundary of the Central Black Forest in this classification runs south of the Rench Valley and the Kniebis to near Freudenstadt. Its southern boundary varied with each edition.

In 1998, the Baden-Württemberg State Department for Environmental Protection (today the Baden-Württemberg State Department for the Environment, Survey and Nature Conservation) published a reworked Natural Region Division of Baden-Württemberg. It is restricted to the level of the natural regional major units and has been used since for the state's administration of nature conservation:

No.	Natural region	Area in km^{2}	Population	Pop./km^{2}	Settlement area in %	Open land in %	Forest in %	Major centres of population	Middle-sized centres of population
150	Black Forest Foothills	930	268,000	289	7.69	29.33	62.92	Pforzheim	Calw, Freudenstadt
151	Black Forest Grinden and Enz Hills	699	60,000	86	1.92	6.39	91.51		
152	Northern Black Forest Valleys	562	107,000	190	4.12	19.48	76.41		Baden-Baden, Gaggenau/Gernsbach
153	Central Black Forest	1,422	188,000	133	3.35	30.25	66.39		Haslach/Hausach/Wolfach, Waldkirch, Schramberg
154	Southeastern Black Forest	558	80,923	112	3.03	32.44	64.49	Villingen-Schwenningen	
155	High Black Forest	1,990	213,000	107	2.44	26.93	70.31		Schopfheim, Titisee-Neustadt

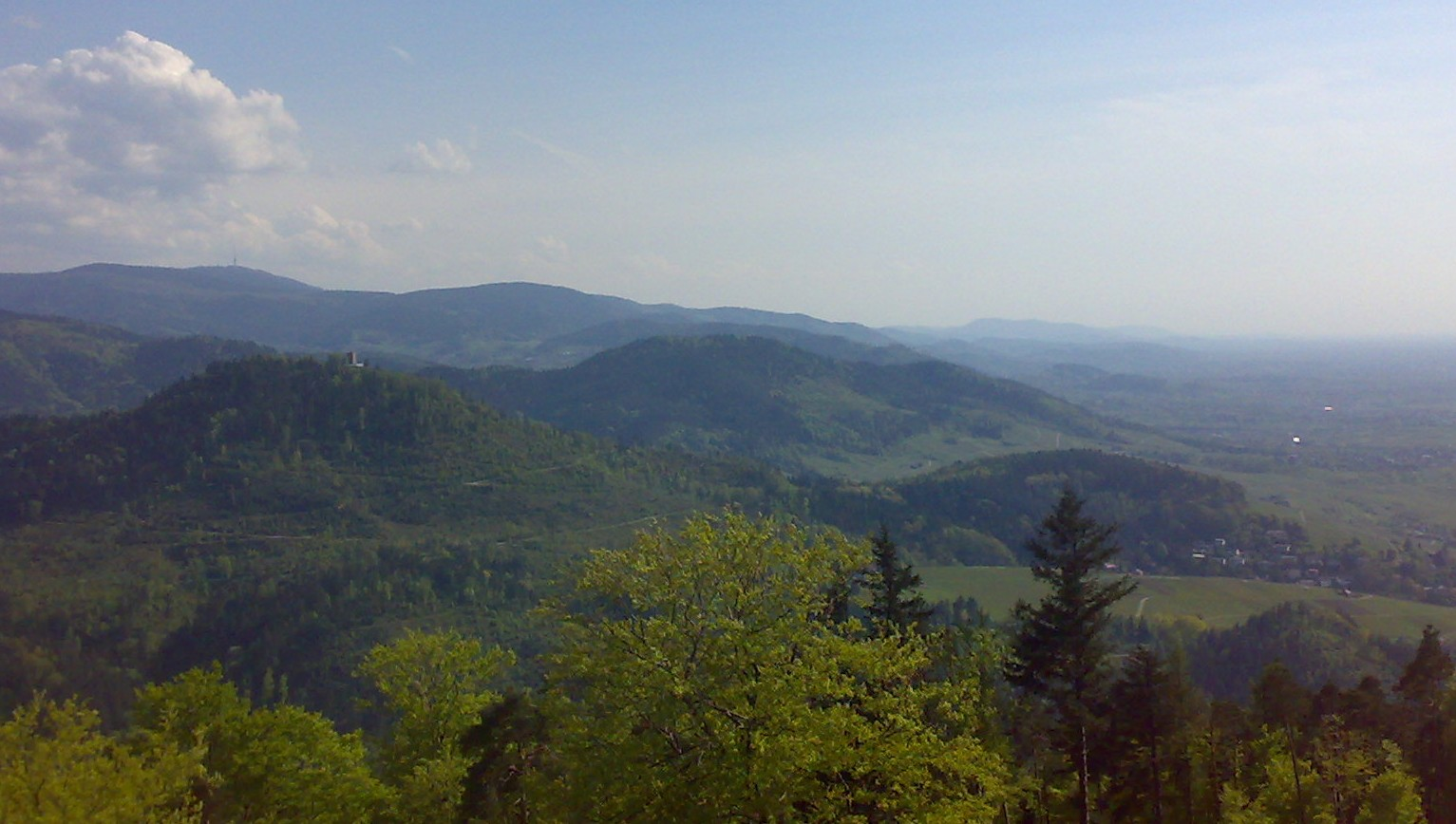
Slopes of the Northern Black Forest to the Upper Rhine Plain (Northern Black Forest Valleys)

The Black Forest Foothills (Schwarzwald-Randplatten, 150) geomorphologically form plateaux on the north and northeast periphery of the mountain range that descend to the Kraichgau in the north and the Heckengäu landscapes in the east. They are incised by valleys, especially those of the Nagold river system, into individual interfluves; a narrow northwestern finger extends to beyond the Enz near Neuenbürg and also borders the middle reaches of the Alb to the west as far as a point immediately above Ettlingen. To the southwest it is adjoined by the Black Forest Grinden and Enz Hills (Grindenschwarzwald und Enzhöhen, 151), along the upper reaches of the Enz and Murg, forming the heart of the Northern Black Forest. The west of the Northern Black Forest is formed by the Northern Black Forest Valleys (Nördliche Talschwarzwald, 152) with the middle reaches of the Murg around Gernsbach, the middle course of the Oos to Baden-Baden, the middle reaches of the Bühlot above Bühls and the upper reaches of the Rench around Oppenau. Their exit valleys from the mountain range are all oriented towards the northwest.

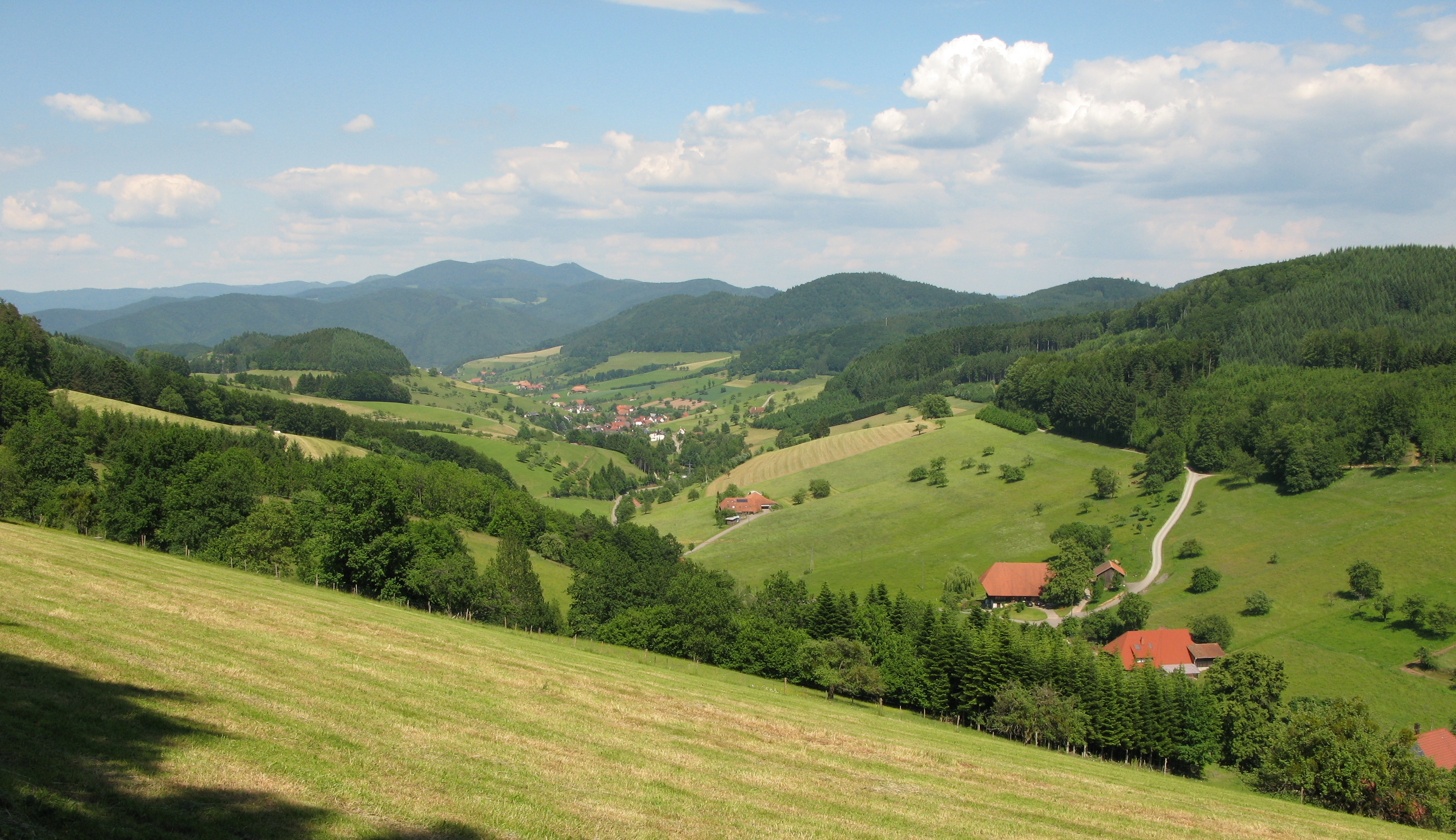
Grassland economy in side valleys of the Kinzig, Central Black Forest

The Central Black Forest (153) is mainly restricted to the catchment area of the River Kinzig above Offenburg as well as the Schutter and the low hills north of the Elz.

The Southeastern Black Forest (Südöstlicher Schwarzwald, 154) consists mainly of the catchment areas of the upper reaches of the Danube headstreams, the Brigach and Breg as well as the left side valleys of the Wutach north of Neustadt – and thus draining from the northeast of the Southern Black Forest. To the south and west it is adjoined by the High Black Forest (Hochschwarzwald, 155) with the highest summits in the whole range around the Feldberg and the Belchen. Its eastern part, the Southern Black Forest Plateau, is oriented towards the Danube, but drained over the Wutach and the Alb into the Rhine. The southern crest of the Black Forest in the west is deeply incised by the Rhine into numerous ridges. Immediately right of the Wiese above Lörrach rises the relatively small Bunter Sandstone-Rotliegendes table of the Weintenau Uplands (Weitenauer Bergland) in the extreme southwest of the Black Forest; morphologically, geologically and climatically it is separate from the other parts of the Southern Black Forest and, in this classification, is also counted as part of the High Black Forest.

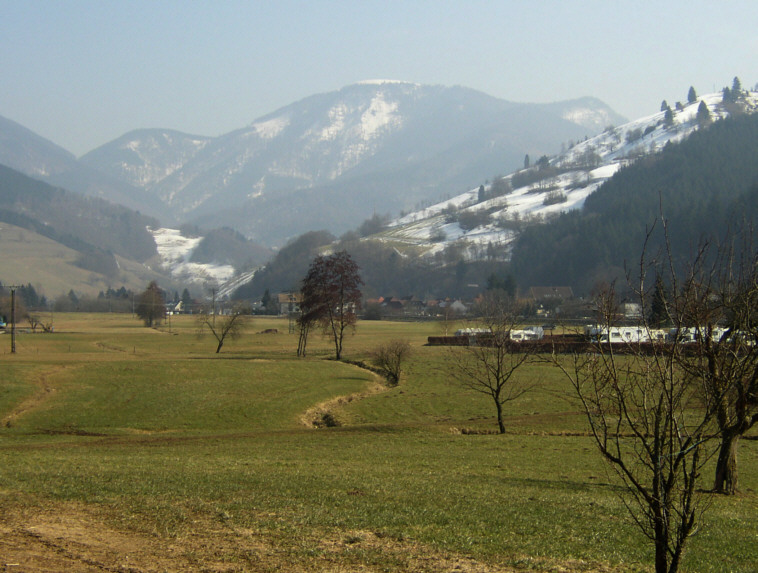
The Belchen in the Southern Black Forest with its bare dome, seen from Münstertal

=== Mountains ===
At 1,493 m above sea level (NHN) the Feldberg in the Southern Black Forest is the range's highest summit. Also in the same area are the Herzogenhorn (1,415 m) and the Belchen (1,414 m). In general the mountains of the Southern or High Black Forest are higher than those in the Northern Black Forest. The highest Black Forest peak north of the Freiburg–Höllental–Neustadt line is the Kandel (1,241.4 m). Like the highest point of the Northern Black Forest, the Hornisgrinde (1,163 m), or the Southern Black Forest lookout mountains, the Schauinsland (1,284.4 m) and Blauen (1,164.7 m) it lies near the western rim of the range.

=== Rivers and lakes ===
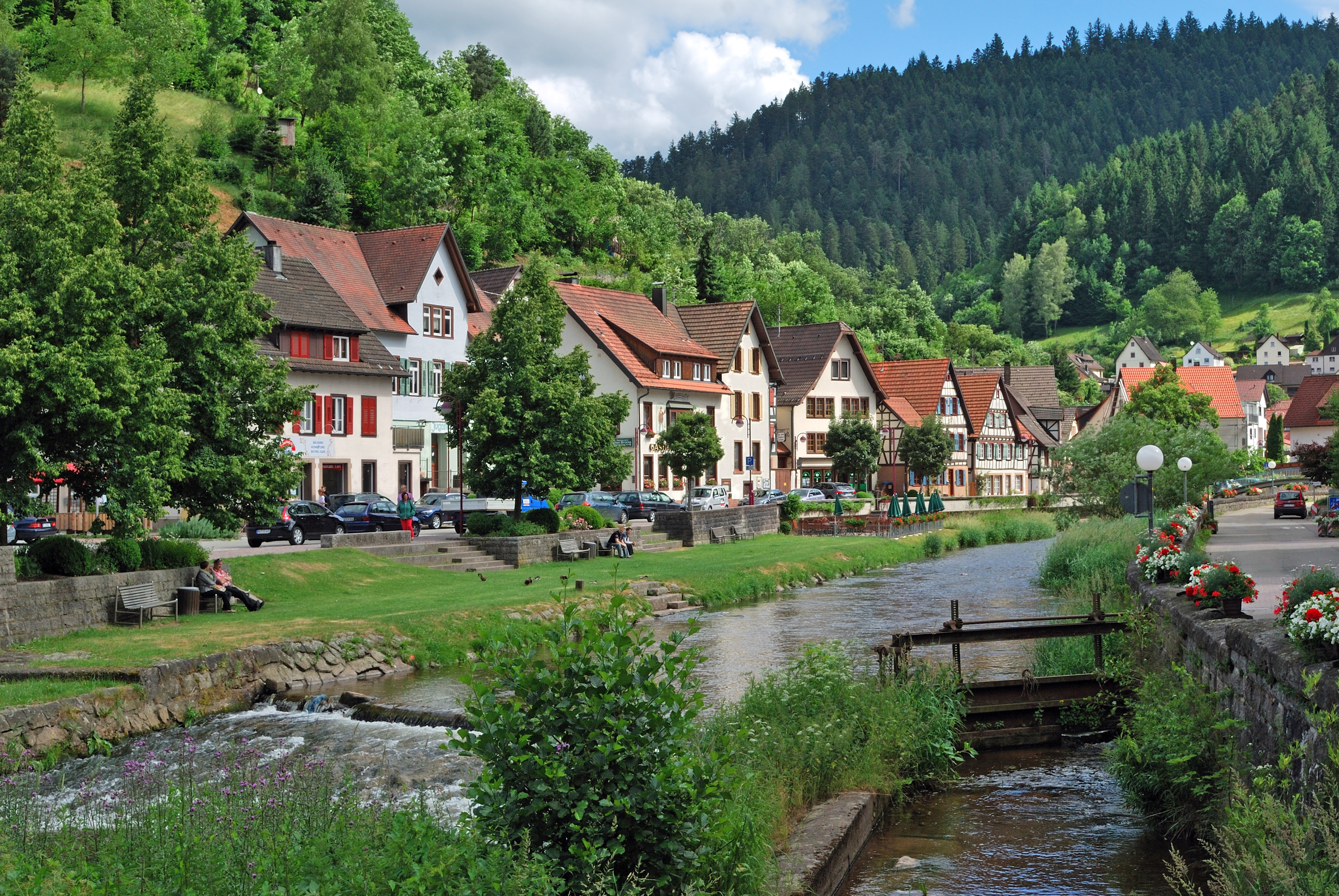
The River Schiltach in Schiltach

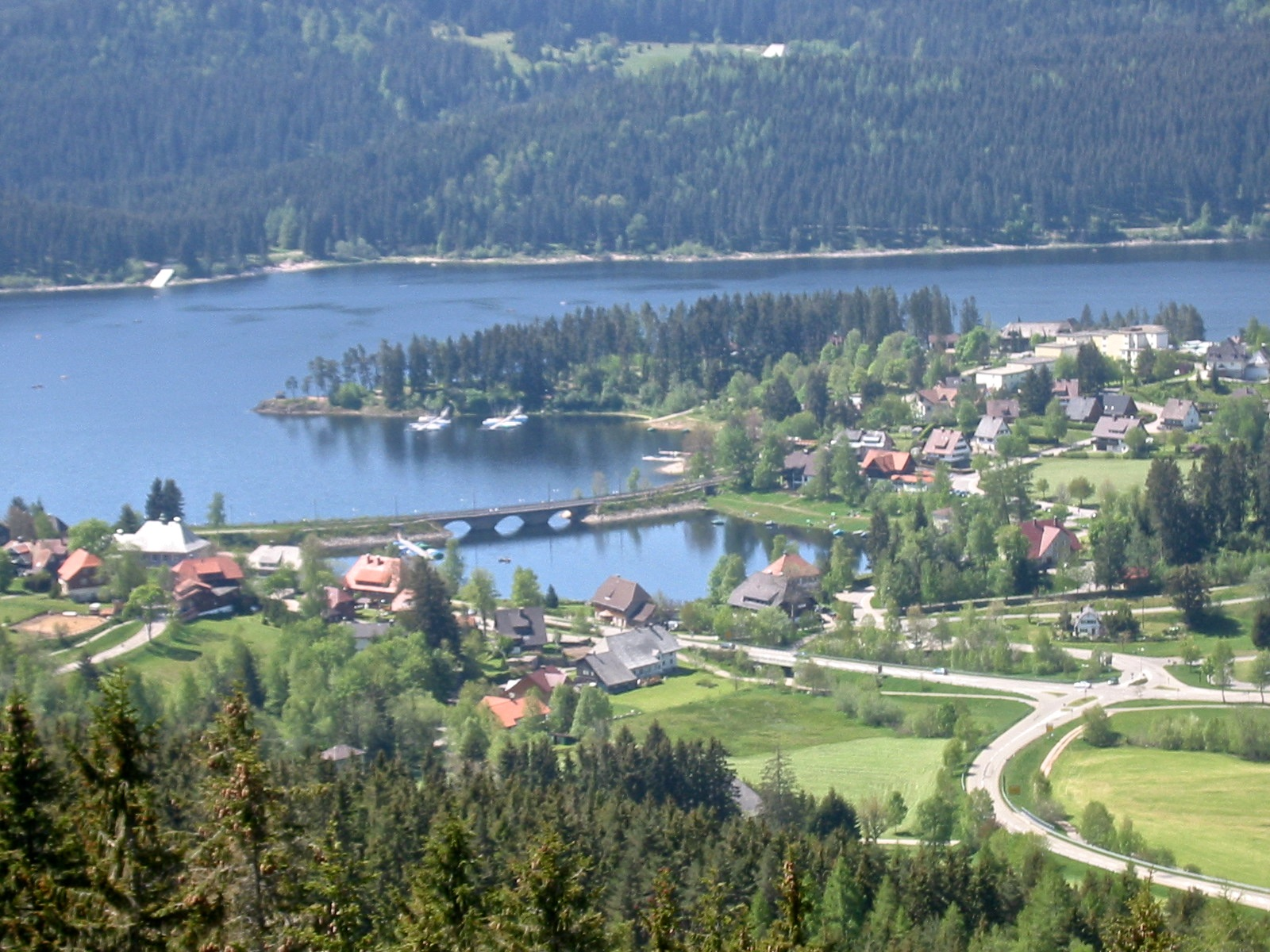
The Schluchsee, north of St. Blasien

Rivers in the Black Forest include the Danube (which originates in the Black Forest as the confluence of the Brigach and Breg rivers), the Enz, the Kinzig, the Murg, the Nagold, the Neckar, the Rench, and the Wiese. The Black Forest occupies part of the continental divide between the Atlantic Ocean drainage basin (drained by the Rhine) and the Black Sea drainage basin (drained by the Danube).

The longest Black Forest rivers are (lengths include stretches outside the Black Forest):

- Enz (105 kilometres; 65 mi)
- Kinzig (93 kilometres; 58 mi)
- Elz (90 kilometres; 56 mi)
- Wutach (91 kilometres; 57 mi)
- Nagold (90 kilometres; 56 mi), hydrological main artery of the Nagold-Enz systems
- Danube (86 kilometres; 53 mi), headstreams:
  - Breg (46 kilometres; 29 mi)
  - Brigach (40 kilometres; 25 mi)
- Murg (79 kilometres; 49 mi)
- Rench (57 kilometres; 35 mi)
- Schutter (56 kilometres; 35 mi)
- Wiese (55 kilometres; 34 mi)
- Acher (54 kilometres; 34 mi)
- Dreisam (incl. Rotbach 49 kilometres; 30 mi)
- Alb (incl. Menzenschwander Alb 43 kilometres; 27 mi)
- Glatt (37 kilometres; 23 mi)
- Möhlin (32 kilometres; 20 mi)
- Wolf (31 kilometres; 19 mi)
- Schiltach (30 kilometres; 19 mi)
- Wehra (incl. Rüttebach 28 kilometres; 17 mi)
- Oos (25 kilometres; 16 mi)
- Glasbach (18 kilometres; 11 mi), hydrological main artery of the Neckar system

Important lakes of natural, glacial origin in the Black Forest include the Titisee, the Mummelsee and the Feldsee. Especially in the Northern Black Forest are a number of other, smaller tarns. Numerous reservoirs like the – formerly natural but much smaller – Schluchsee with the other lakes of the Schluchseewerk, the Schwarzenbach Reservoir, the Kleine Kinzig Reservoir or the Nagold Reservoir are used for electricity generation, flood protection or drinking water supply.

== Geology ==
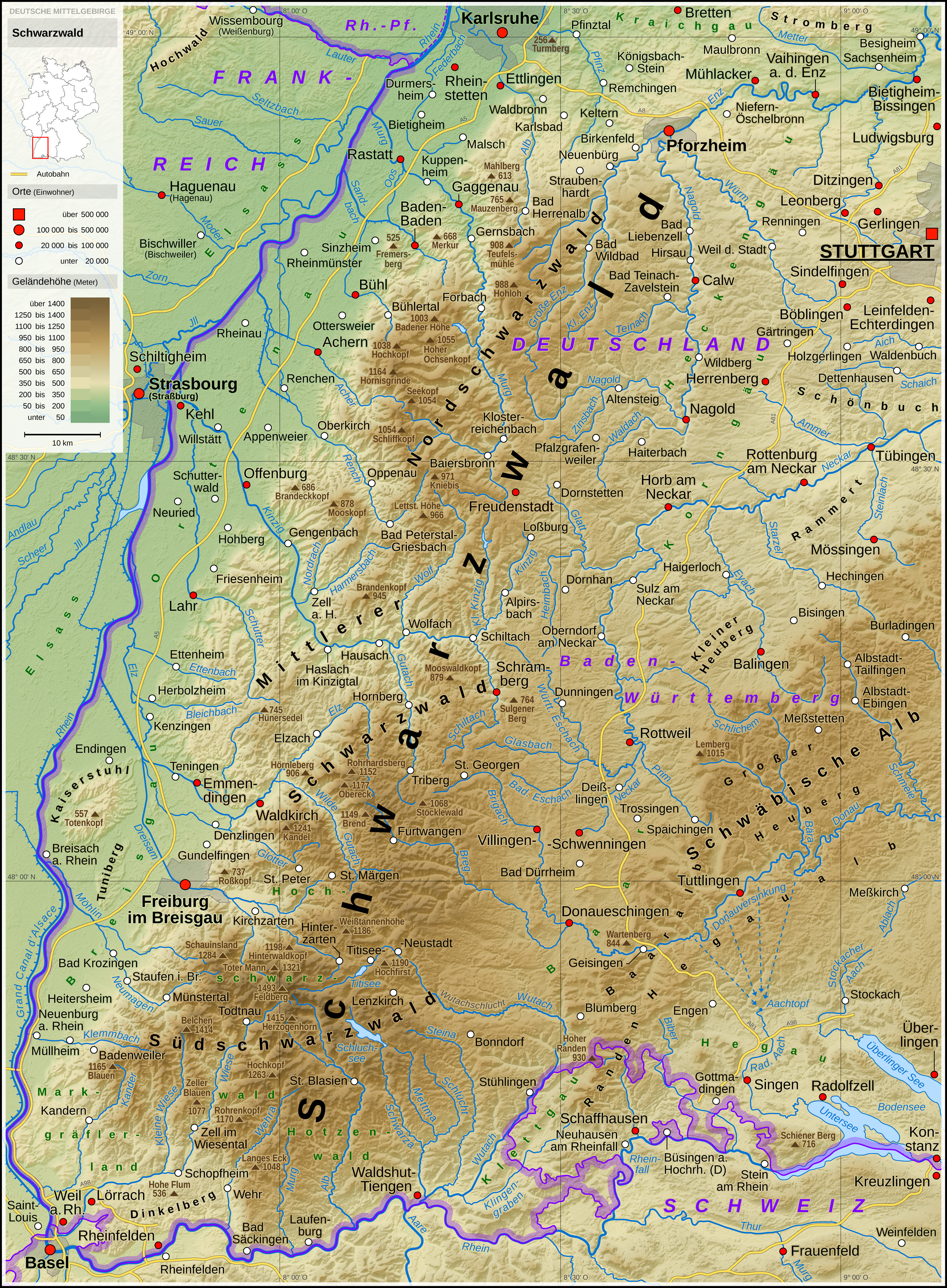
Topography of the Black Forest

The Black Forest consists of a cover of sandstone on top of a core of gneiss and granite. Formerly it shared tectonic evolution with the nearby Vosges Mountains. Later during the Middle Eocene a rifting period affected the area and caused formation of the Upper Rhine Plain. During the last glacial period of the Würm glaciation, the Black Forest was covered by glaciers; several tarns (or lakes) such as the Mummelsee are remains of this period.

=== Basement ===
The geological foundation of the Black Forest is formed by the crystalline bedrock of the Variscan basement. This is covered in the east and northeast by Bunter Sandstone slabs, the so-called platforms. On the western edge a descending, step-fault-like, foothill zone borders the Upper Rhine Graben consisting of rocks of the Triassic and Jurassic periods.

The dominant rocks of the basement are gneiss (ortho- and paragneisses, in the south also migmatites and diatexites, for example on the Schauinsland and Kandel). These gneisses were penetrated by a number of granitic bodies during the Carboniferous period. Among the bigger ones are the Triberg Granite and the Forbach Granite, the youngest is the Bärhalde Granite. In the south lies the zone of Badenweiler-Lenzkirch, in which Palaeozoic rocks have been preserved (volcanite and sedimentary rocks), which are interpreted as the intercalated remains of a microcontinental collision. Still further in the southeast (around Todtmoos) is a range of exotic inclusions: gabbro from Ehrsberg, serpentinites and pyroxenites near Todtmoos, norite near Horbach), which are possibly the remnants of an accretionary wedge from a continental collision. Also noteworthy are the basins in the Rotliegend, for example the Schramberg or the Baden-Baden Basin with thick quartz-porphyry and tuff plates (exposed, for example, on the rock massif of Battert near Baden-Baden). Thick rotliegendes rock, covered by bunter, also occurs in the north of the Dinkelberg block (several hundred metres thick in the Basel geothermal borehole). Even further to the southeast, under the Jura, lies the North Swiss Permocarboniferous Basin.

=== Uplift of the mountains ===
Since the downfaulting of the Upper Rhine Graben during the Eocene epoch, the two shoulders on either side have been uplifted: the Black Forest to the east and the Vosges to the west. In the centre lies the Kaiserstuhl volcano, which dates to the Miocene. In the times that followed, the Mesozoic platform on the uplands was largely eroded, apart from remains of Bunter Sandstone and Rotliegend Group, but it has survived within the graben itself. During the Pliocene a pronounced but uneven bulge especially affected the southern Black Forest, including the Feldberg. As a result, the upper surface of the basement in the northern part of the forest around the Hornisgrinde is considerably lower. In the central Black Forest, the tectonic syncline of the Kinzig and Murg emerged.

Geomorphologist Walther Penck regarded the Black Forest as an uplifted geologic dome and modeled his theory of piedmonttreppen (piedmont benchlands) on it.

=== Platform ===
Above the crystalline basement of the Northern Black Forest and the adjacent parts of the Central Black Forest, the bunter sandstone platforms rise in prominent steps. The most resistant surface strata on the stepped terrain of the grinden uplands and the heights around the upper reaches of the Enz, which have been heavily eroded by the tributaries of the Murg, is the silicified main conglomerate (Middle Bunter). To the east and north are the nappes of the Upper Bunter (platten sandstones and red clays). South of the Kinzig the Bunter Sandstone zone narrows to a fringe in the east of the mountain range.

=== Ice age and topography ===
It is considered proven that the Black Forest was heavily glaciated during the peak periods of at least the Riss and Würm glaciations (up to about 11,000 years ago). This glacial geomorphology characterizes almost all of the High Black Forest as well as the main ridge of the Northern Black Forest. Apart from that, it is only discernible from a large number of cirques mainly facing northeast. Especially in this direction snow accumulated on the shaded and leeward slopes of the summit plateau to form short cirque glaciers that made the sides of these funnel-shaped depressions. There are still tarns in some of these old cirques, partly a result of the anthropogenic elevation of the low-side lip of the cirque, such as the Mummelsee, Wildsee, Schurmsee, Glaswaldsee, Buhlbachsee, Nonnenmattweiher, and Feldsee. The Titisee formed as glacial lake behind a glacial moraine.

== Culture ==
The Black Forest is mainly rural, with many scattered villages and a few large towns. Tradition and custom are celebrated in many places in the form of annual festivities. The main dialect spoken in the Black Forest area is Alemannic. The forest is best known for its typical farmhouses with their sweeping half-hipped roofs, its Black Forest gâteaus, Black Forest ham, Black Forest gnomes, Kirschwasser and the cuckoo clock.

=== Traditional costume ===
Traditional costume or Tracht is still sometimes worn today, usually at festive occasions. The appearance of such costume varies from region to region, sometimes markedly. One of the best-known Black Forest costumes is that of the villages of Kirnbach, Reichenbach and Gutach im Kinzigtal with the characteristic Bollenhut headdress. Unmarried women wear the hats with red bobbles or Bollen; married women wear black. Engaged women sometimes wear a bridal crown (Schäppel) before and on the day of their wedding, whose largest examples from the town of St. Georgen weigh up to 6-7 kilograms.

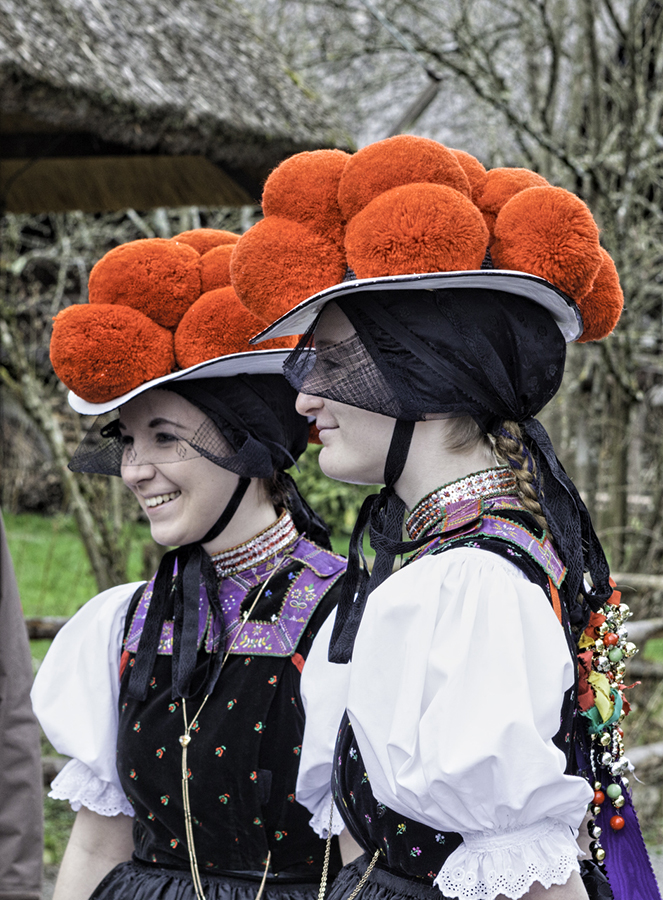
Traditionally, the Bollenhut is worn by unmarried women as part of the tracht.

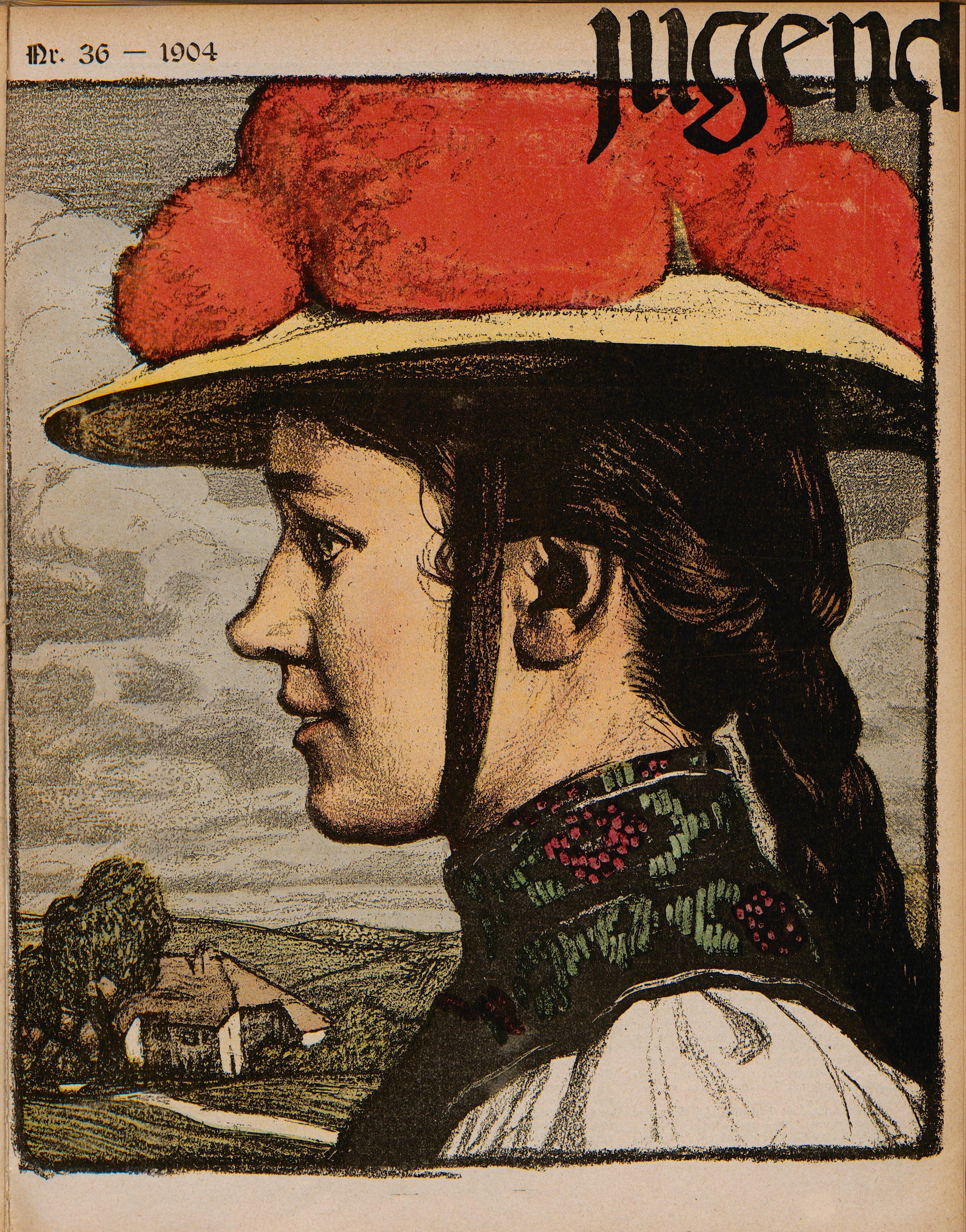

=== Art ===
Its rural beauty as well as the sense of tradition of its inhabitants attracted many artists in the 19th and early 20th centuries, whose works made the Black Forest famous the world over. Notable were Hans Thoma from Bernau and his fellow student, Rudolf Epp, who was sponsored by the Grand Duke of Baden, Frederick I. Both artists painted motifs from the Black Forest throughout their lives. Artist J. Metzler from Düsseldorf travelled through the Black Forest to paint his landscapes. The works of the Gutach artist colony around Wilhelm Hasemann were widely admired, their landscape and genre motifs capturing the character of the Black Forest. Like local author Heinrich Hansjakob, they were part of a Baden folk costume movement.

Art gallery

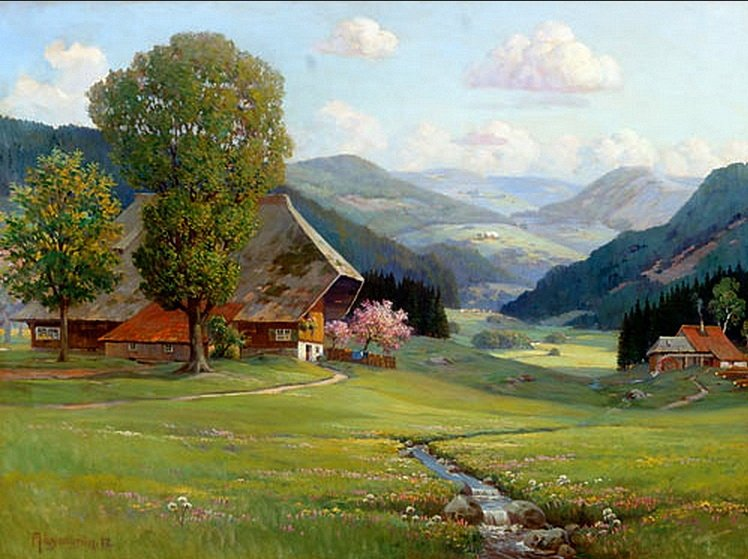
Arnold Lyongrün: Frühling im Schwarzwald (1912)

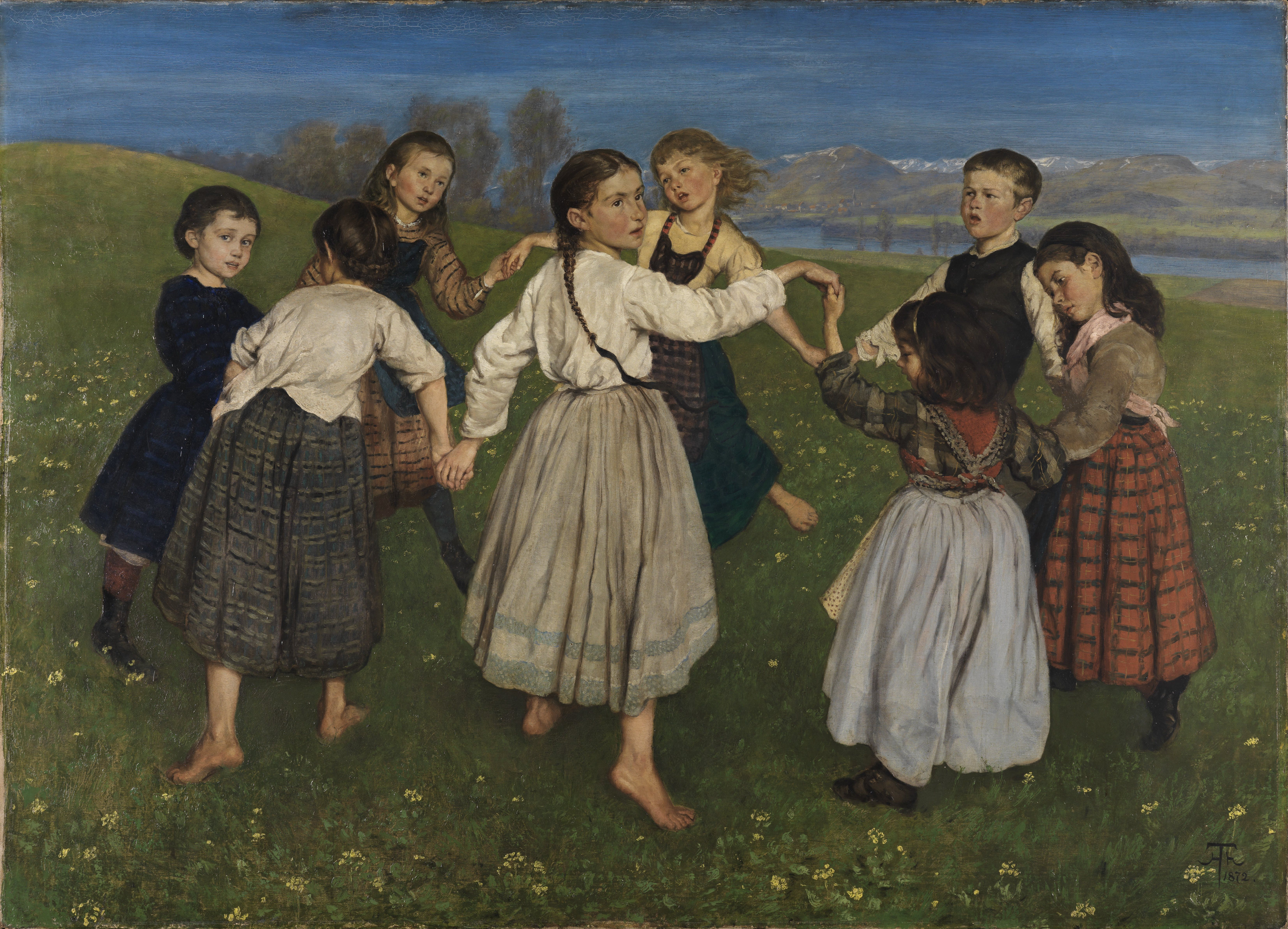
Kinderreigen (1872) by Black Forest artist Hans Thoma

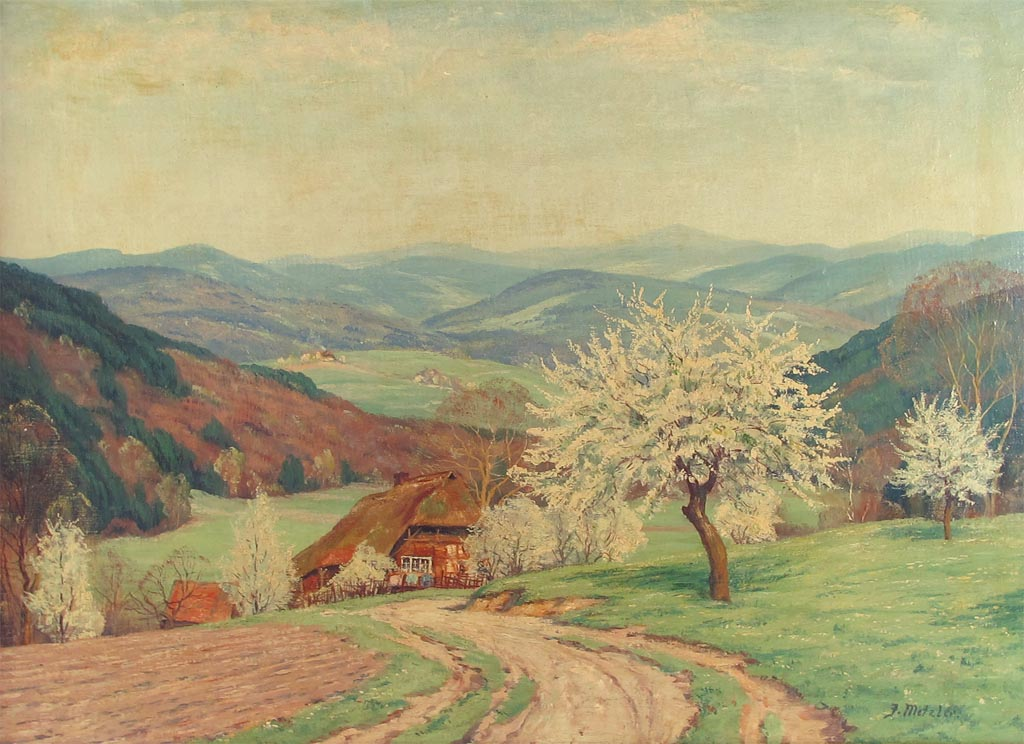
Black Forest landscape by J. Metzler

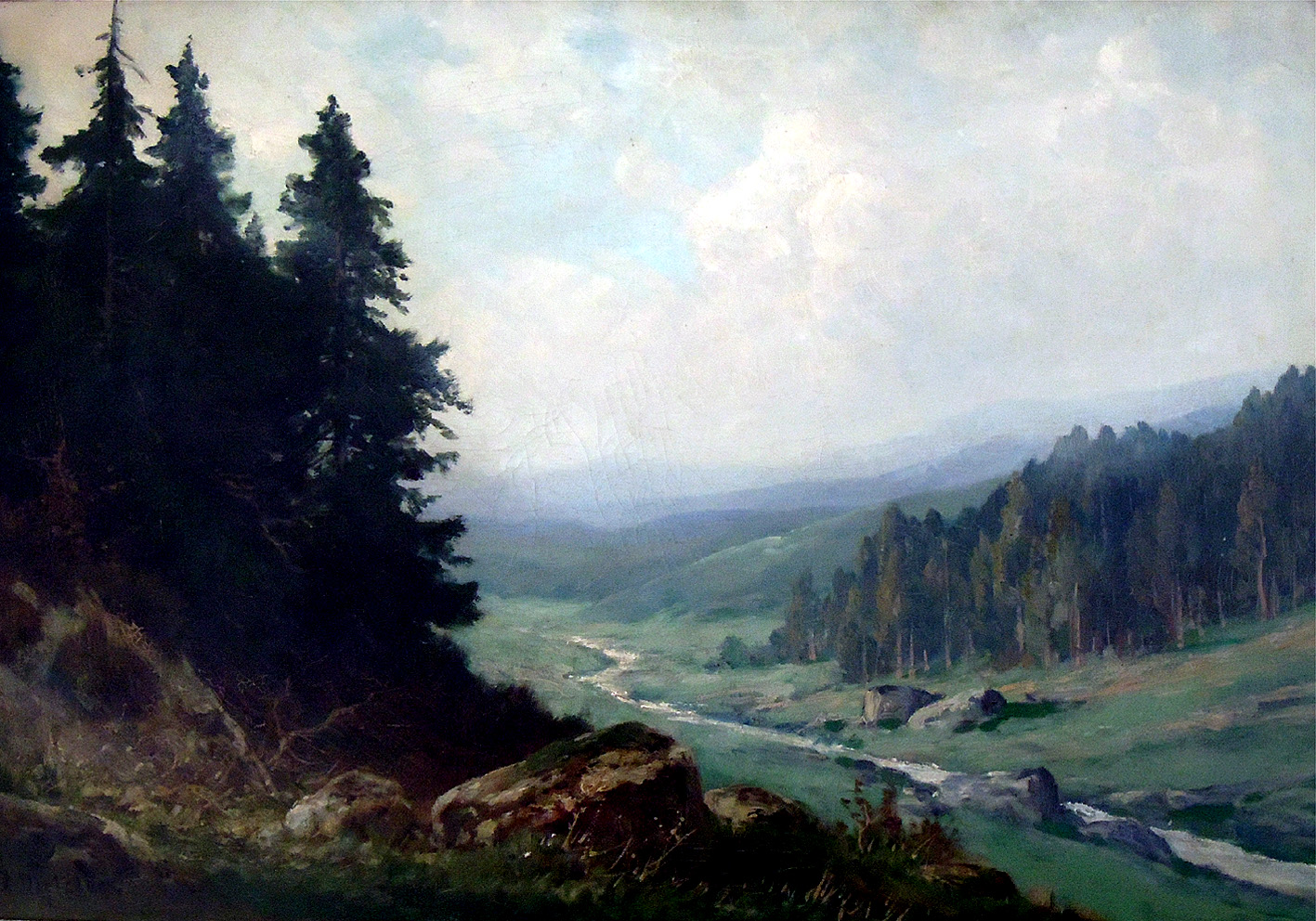
Black Forest landscape by J. Metzler

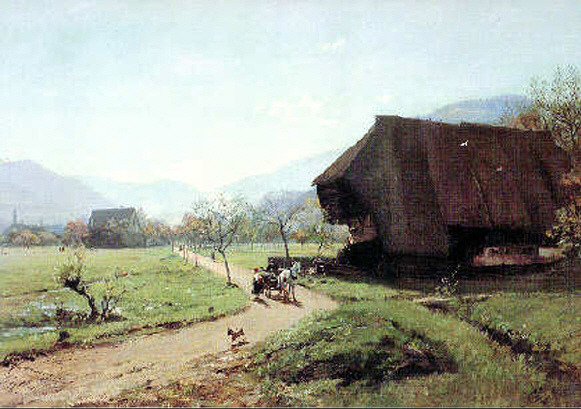
Black Forest farmhouse, painted by Wilhelm Hasemann

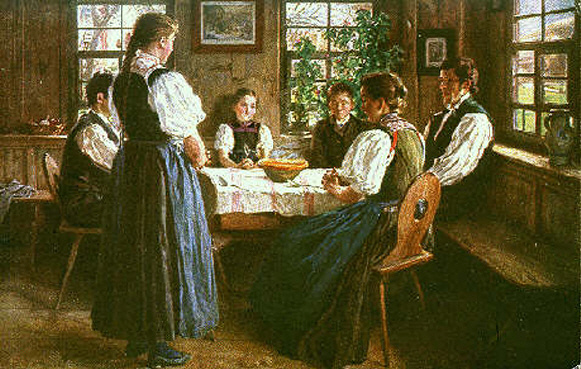
A Gutach family, painted by Wilhelm Hasemann (c. .1900)

=== Crafts ===
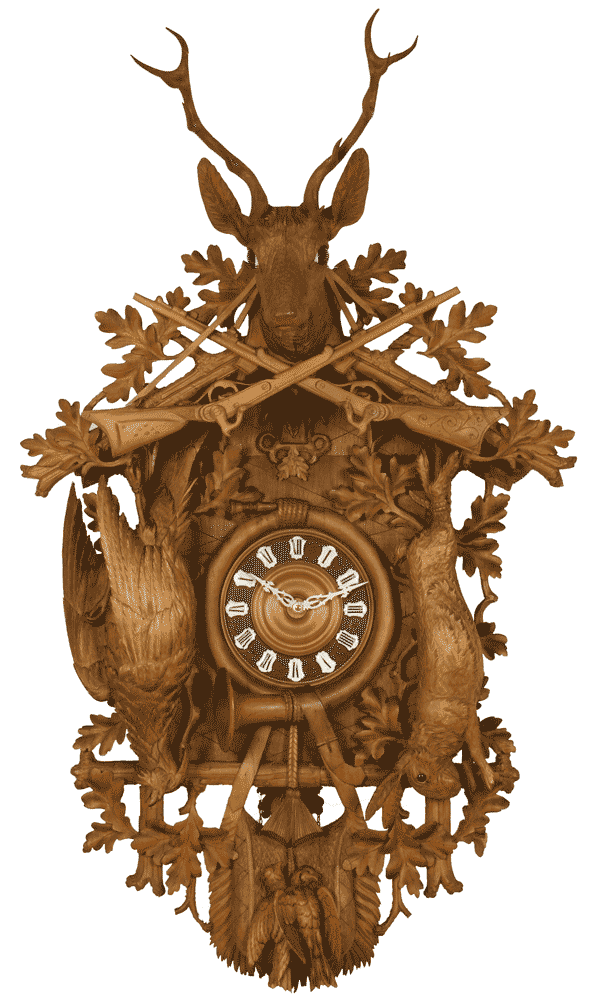
German cuckoo clock

In the field of handicrafts, wood carving produces folk art like the Longinus crosses along with sculptors like Matthias Faller. Wood carving is a traditional cottage industry in the region, and carved ornaments now are produced in substantial numbers as souvenirs for tourists. Cuckoo clocks are a popular example.

Glassblowing is another notable craft of the Black Forest region. At the beginning of the 15th century, the art of glassmaking took hold in the Bavarian-Bohemian border mountains, especially since the necessary raw materials such as quartz and wood were abundant here. With the permission of the manor, glassblowers operated simple glass production facilities as "wandering huts" (Wanderhütten), the locations of which were relocated when the local resources were available. They needed huge amounts of firewood and wood for potash. In the second half of the 18th century, the huts had to close due to a shortage of wood and sales difficulties. Only after 1800, when the demand for luxury glass increased enormously, when a few decades of regulated forestry had ensured the regrowth of the raw material wood and when the forest-destroying potash extraction had become unnecessary due to the new glass flux soda, some glass huts (Glashütten) revived. Some glassblowing factories still testify to this today, for example in Höllental, near Todtnau and in Wolfach.

=== Cuisine ===
Black Forest ham originated from this region, as did the Black Forest gâteau, which is also known as "Black Forest Cherry Cake" or "Black Forest Cake" and is made with chocolate cake, cream, sour cherries and Kirsch. The Black Forest variety of Flammekueche is a Baden specialty made with ham, cheese and cream. Pfannkuchen, a crêpe or crêpe-like (Eierkuchen or Palatschinken) pastry, is also common.

The Black Forest has a tradition of gourmet cuisine. 17 Michelin starred restaurants are located in the region, among them two restaurants with three stars (Restaurants Bareiss and Schwarzwaldstube in Baiersbronn) as well as the only restaurant in Germany that has been awarded a Michelin star every year since 1966. At Schwarzwald Hotel Adler in Häusern, three generations of chefs from the same family have defended the award from the first year the Michelin Guide selected restaurants in Germany until today.

Cuisine gallery

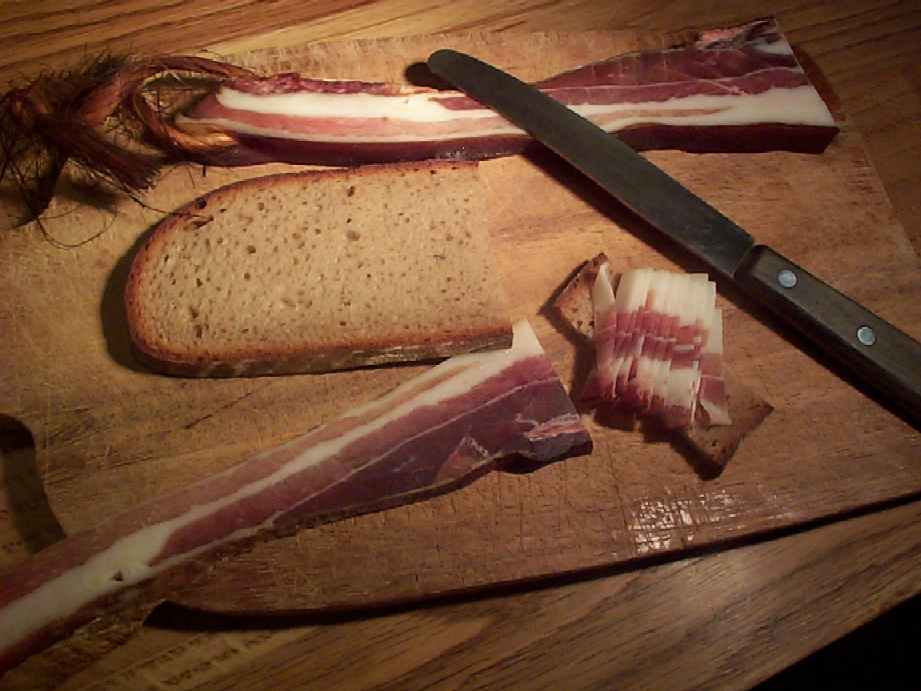
Black Forest ham with German bread

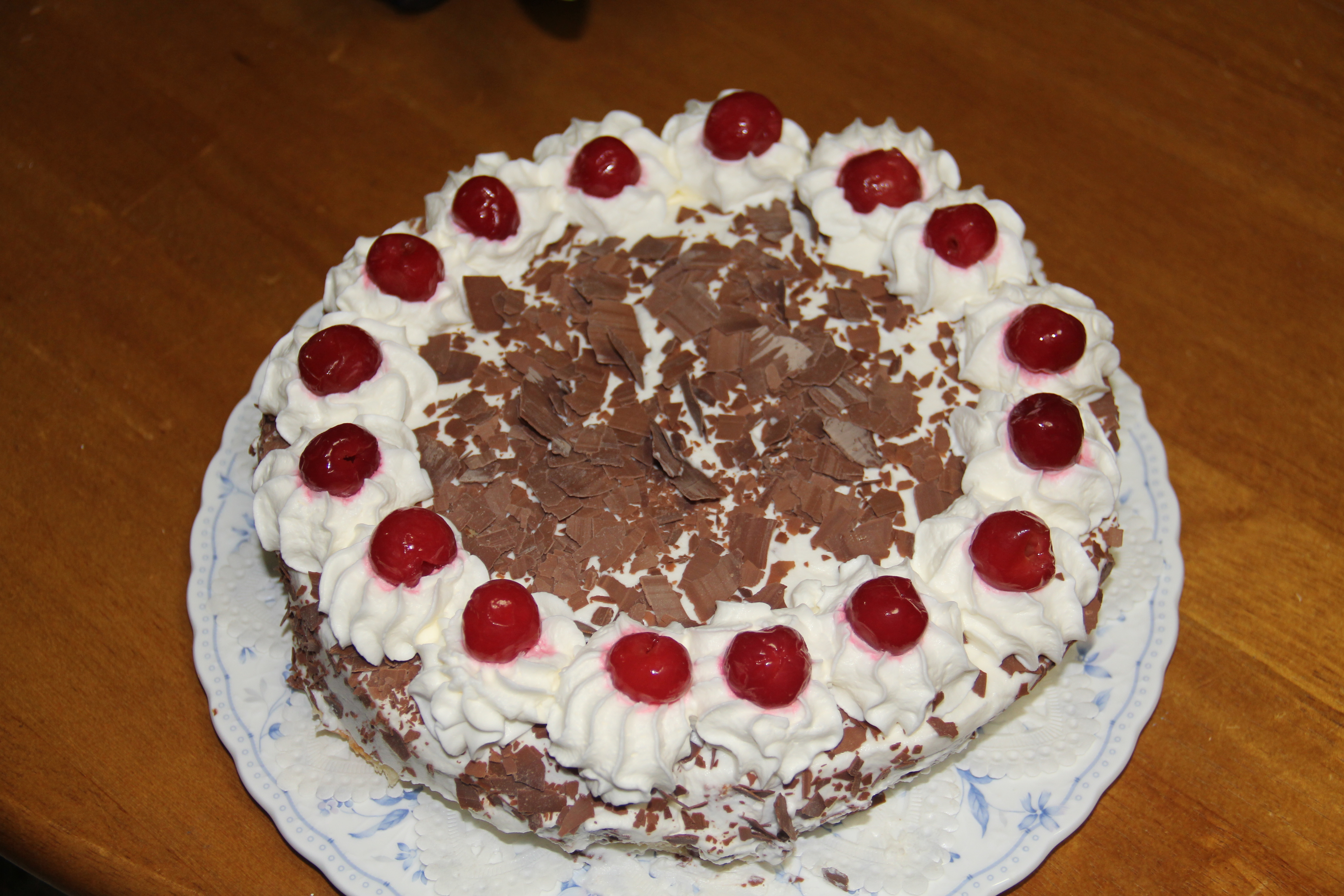
A Black Forest cake

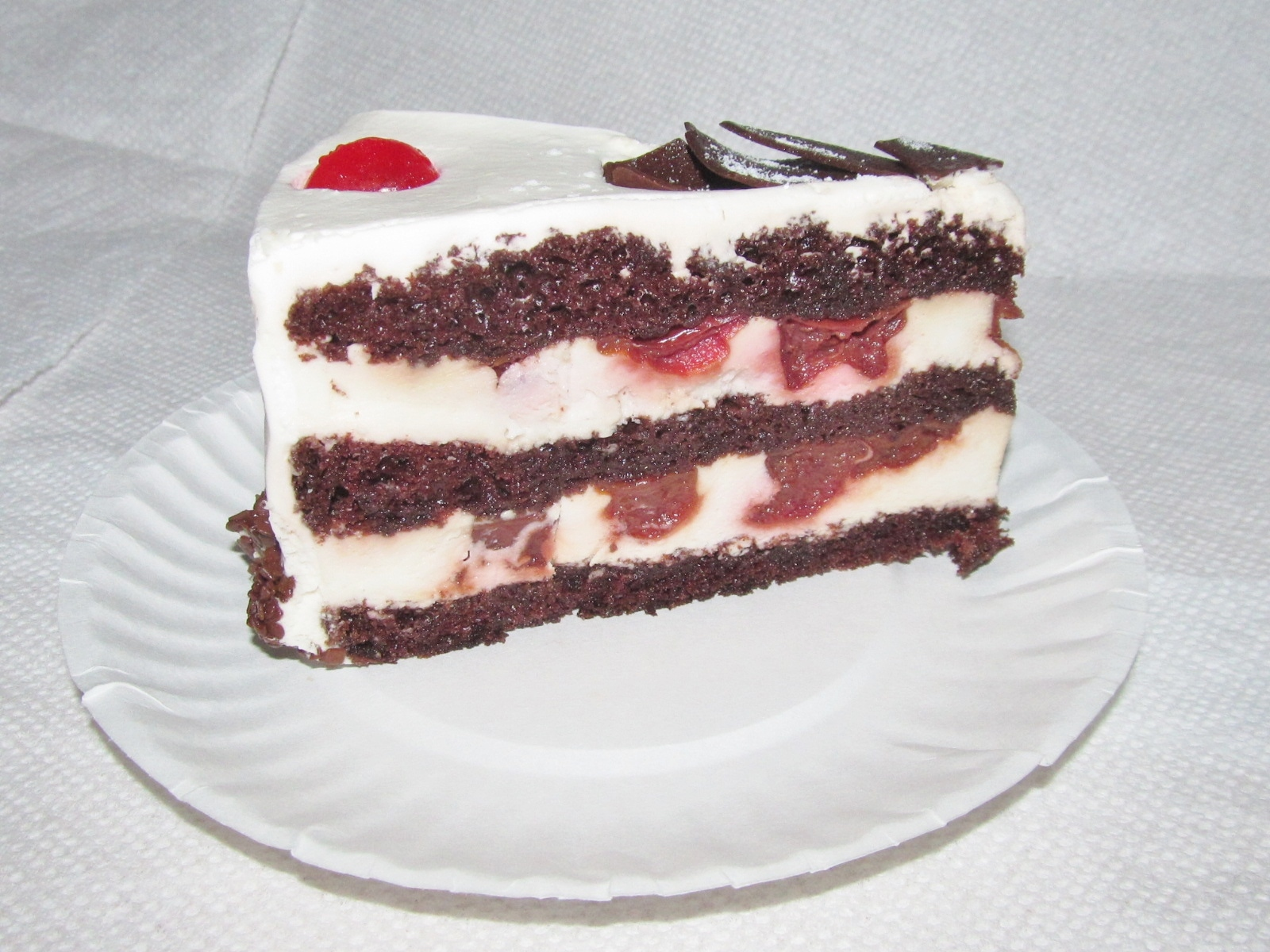
Slice of a Black Forest Cake

=== Fasnet ===
The German holiday of Fastnacht, or Fasnet, as it is known in the Black Forest region, occurs in the time leading up to Lent. On Fasnetmendig, or the Monday before Ash Wednesday, crowds of people line the streets, wearing wooden, mostly hand-carved masks. One prominent style of mask is called the Black Forest Style, originating from the Black Forest Region.

Fastnacht gallery

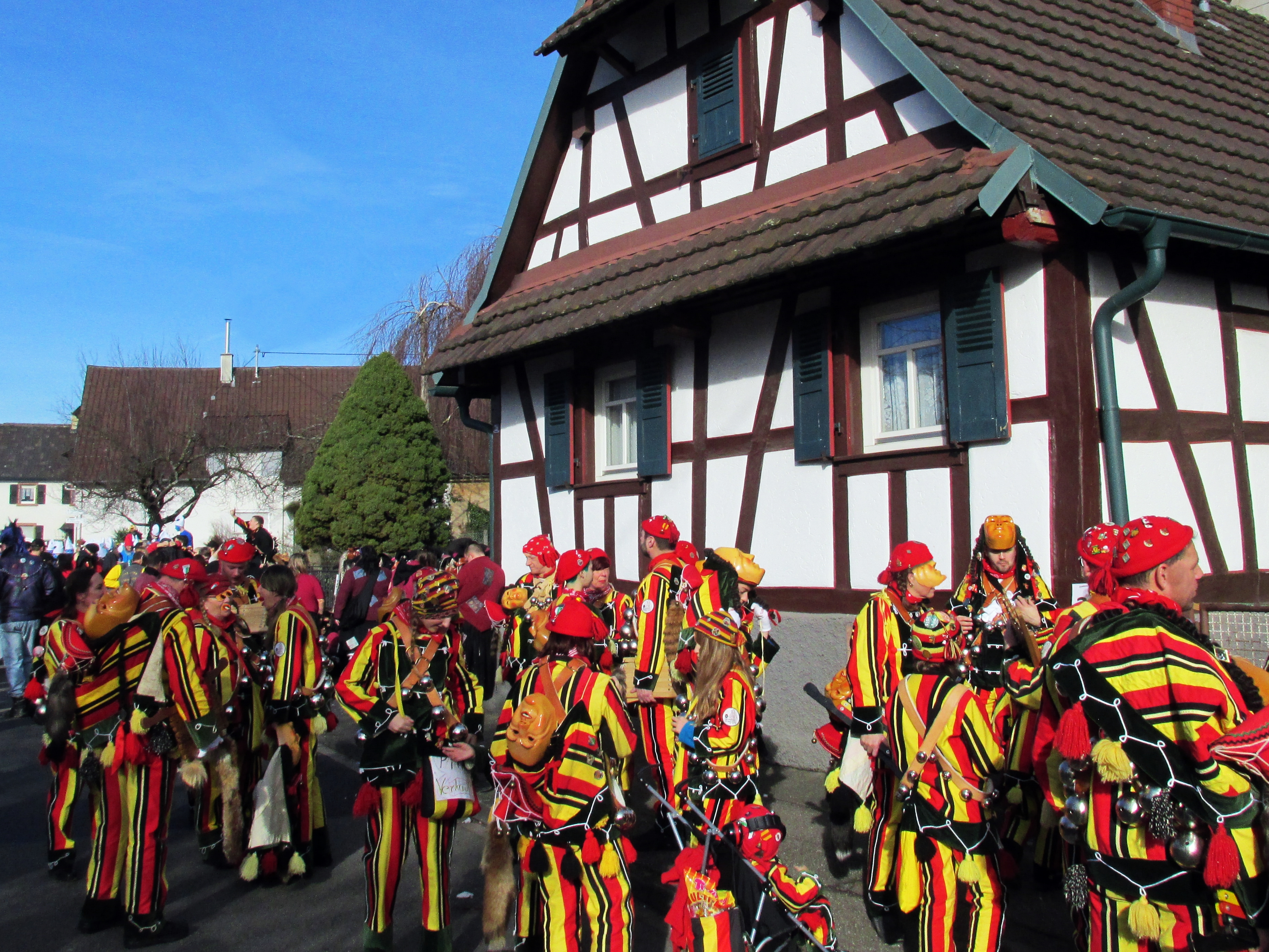
Fastnacht in the Black Forest

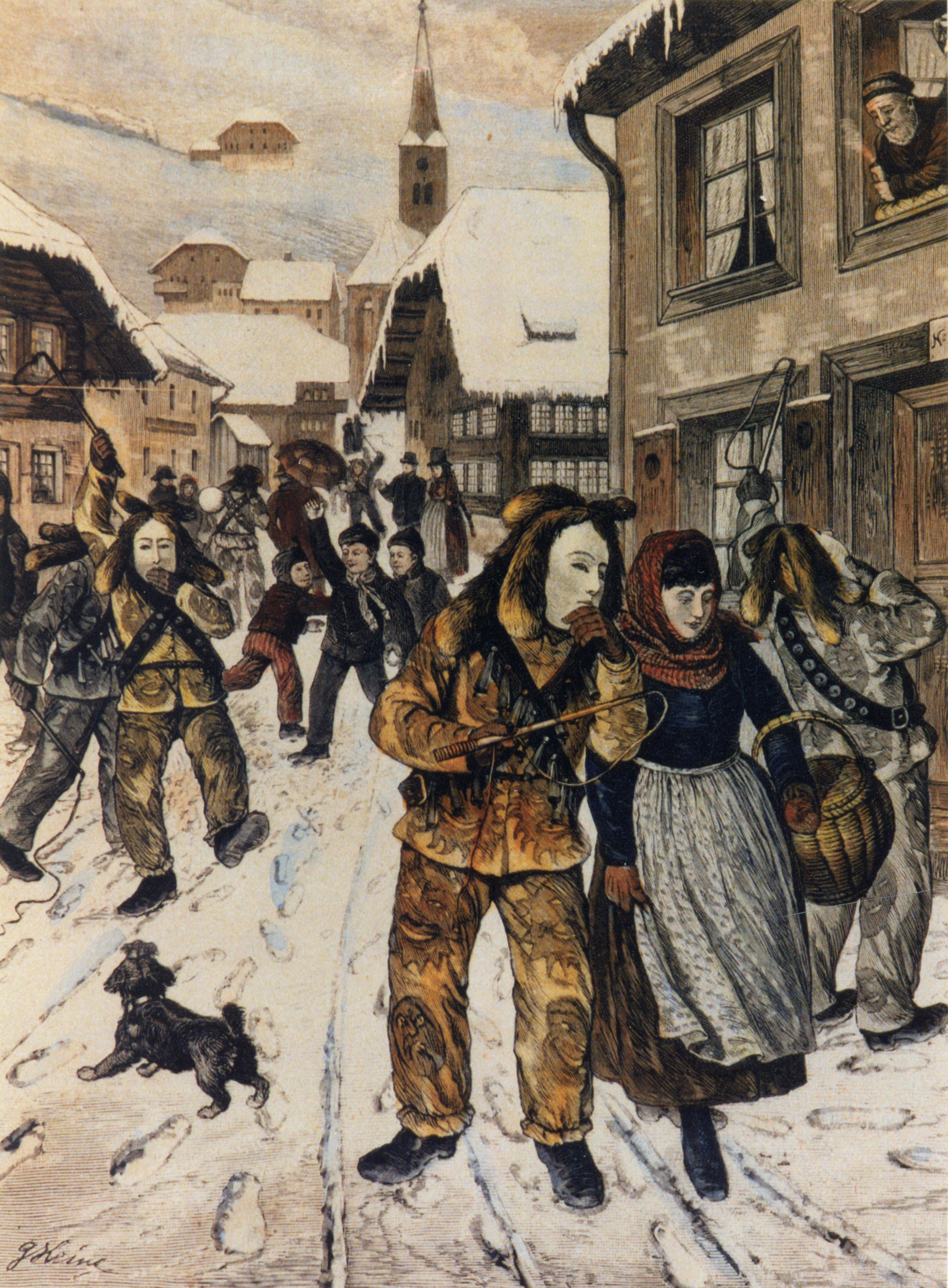
Carnival pleasure in the Black Forest (1890)

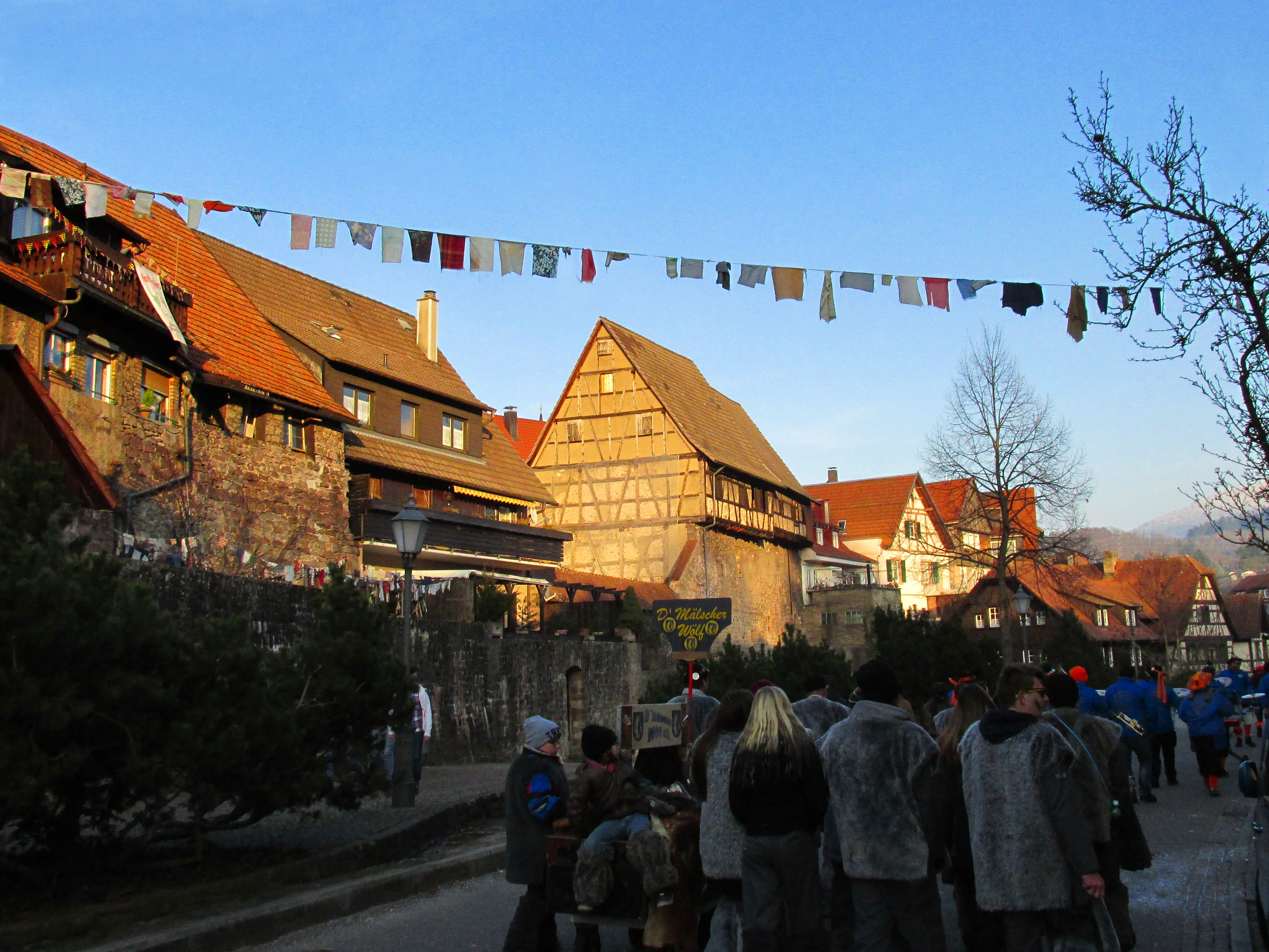
Fastnacht in Gernsbach (Black Forest)

=== Cego ===
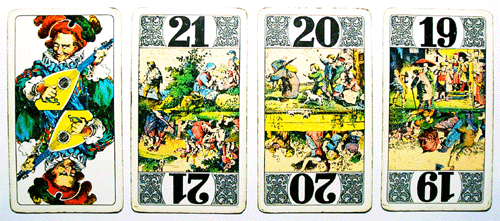
One of two patterns of Cego trump cards

The Black Forest is home to an unusual tarot card game called Cego that is part of the region's cultural heritage. After the defeat of Further Austria in 1805, much of its territory was allocated to the Grand Duchy of Baden. During the ensuing Napoleonic Wars, soldiers from Baden deployed with Napoleon's troops to Spain where, among other things, they learned a new card game, Ombre. They took this back to Baden and adapted it to be played with Tarot cards which were then in common use in southern Germany.

Cego soon developed into the national game of Baden and Hohenzollern, and these are the only regions of Germany where tarot cards are still used for playing games. The game has grown organically, and there are many regional variations, but in recent years the establishment of a Cego Black Forest Championship has led to official tournament rules being defined. In addition, regular courses and local tournaments are held and it is a permanent feature of Alemannic Week, held annually in the Black Forest at the end of September.

== Nature ==
=== Conservation areas ===
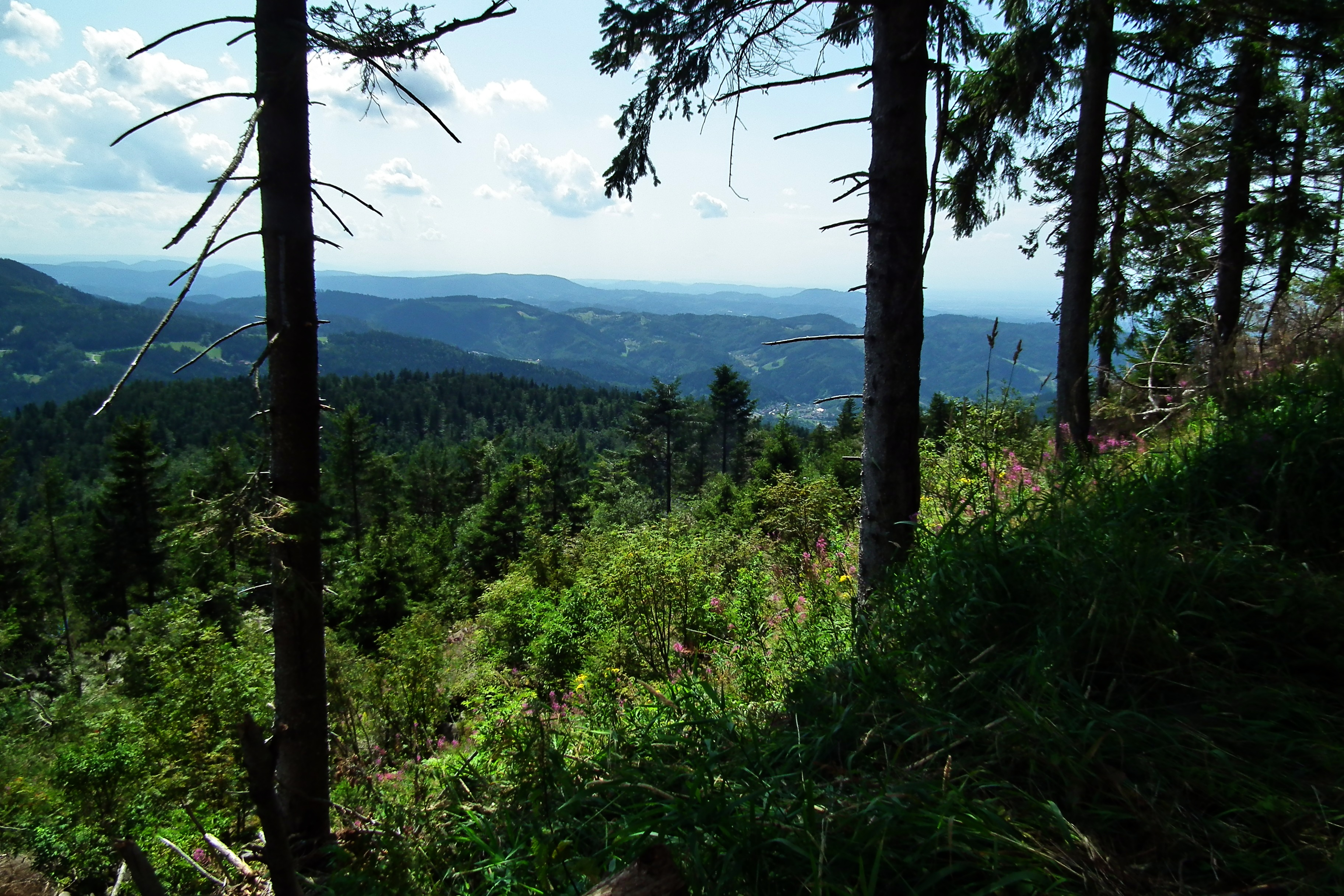
Central/North Black Forest Nature Park: view from the Hornisgrinde (highest mountain of the Northern Black Forest)

There are two nature parks and one national park named after the Black Forest that cover the region: the Southern Black Forest Nature Park, the Central/North Black Forest and the Black Forest National Park. The difference between a nature park and a national park is that a nature park's aims are to strive for environmentally sustainable land use, to preserve the countryside as a cultural landscape, to market local produce more effectively, to make the area more suitable for sustainable tourism and to practice environmental education. A national park's aims are to protect the country's natural heritage, to practice environmental education, to serve purposes of scientific environmental observation and to prevent the area from being commercially exploited.

The Southern Black Forest Nature Park (Naturpark Südschwarzwald) was founded in 1999. It comprises 394,000 ha and is therefore Germany's largest nature park (as of 2020). It encloses the southern part of the Central Black Forest, the Southern Black Forest and adjacent areas.

The Central/North Black Forest Nature Park (Naturpark Schwarzwald Mitte/Nord) was founded in 2000. It covers 375,000 ha and is thus the second-largest in Germany (as of 2020). It begins in the southern part of the Central Black Forest, bordering on the Southern Black Forest Nature Park and covers the rest of the Black Forest to the north.

The Black Forest National Park, established in 2014, is the first national park in Baden-Württemberg. It lies completely within the Central/North Black Forest Nature Park between the cities of Freudenstadt and Baden-Baden and covers an area of 10,062 ha. Its motto is "Natur Natur sein lassen" (let nature be nature).

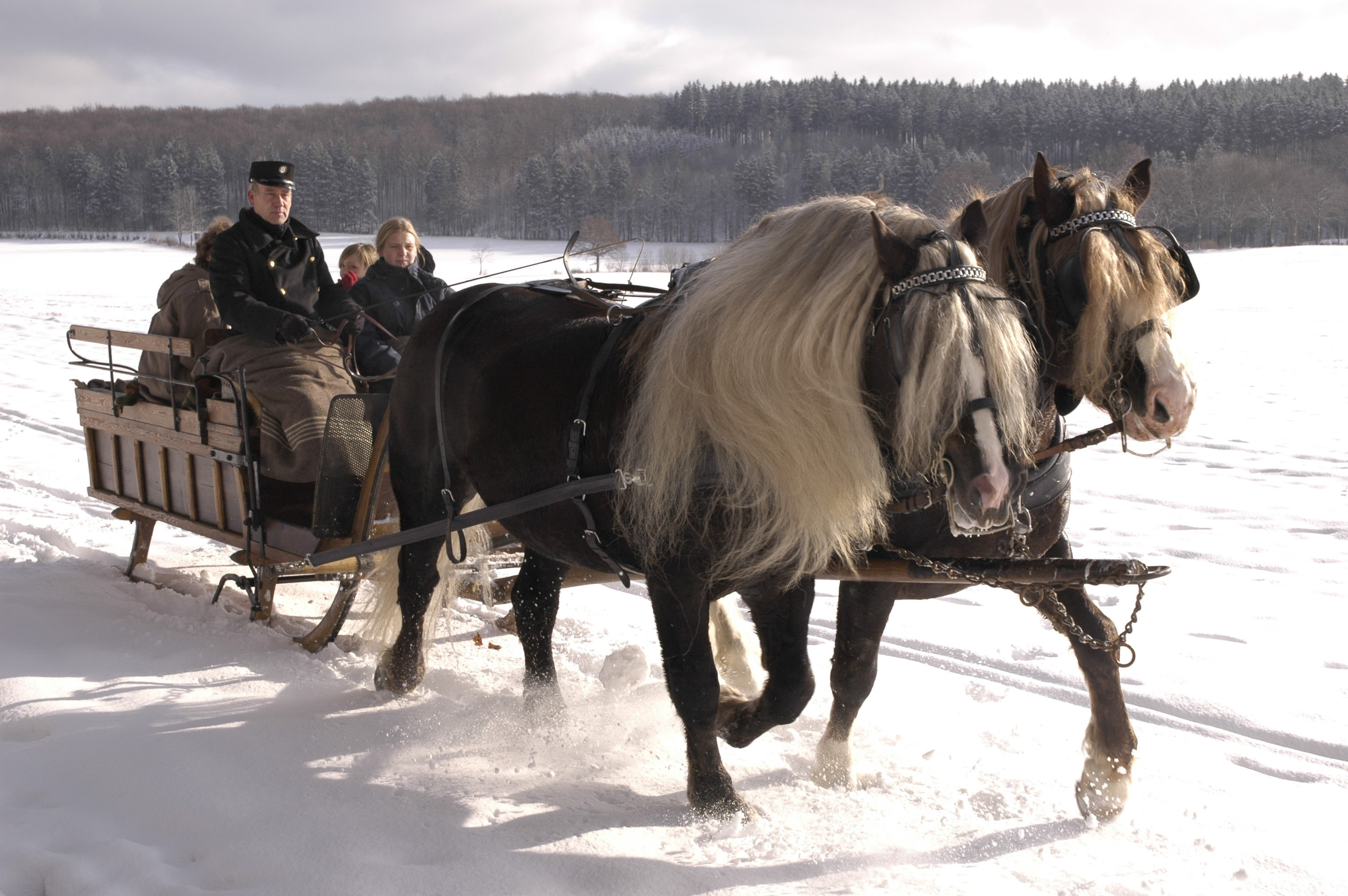
Two Black Forest Horses pulling a sled in the winter

=== Fauna ===
In addition to the characteristic range of fauna found in Central European forests, the following less common animals may be observed in the Black Forest:

- Black Forest cattle which belong to the rare breed of Hinterwälder cattle,
- the giant earthworm Lumbricus badensis, which is found only in the Black Forest region,
- the Black Forest Horse, a draft horse once indispensable for heavy field work and nowadays an endangered breed, and
- the endangered Western capercaillie.

=== Climate ===
The mountain range has lower temperatures and higher rainfall than its surrounding countryside. The highlands of the Black Forest are characterized by regular rainfall throughout the year. However, temperatures do not fall evenly with increasing elevation, nor does the rainfall increase uniformly. Rather, the precipitation rises quickly even in the lower regions and is disproportionately heavy on the rainier western side of the mountains.

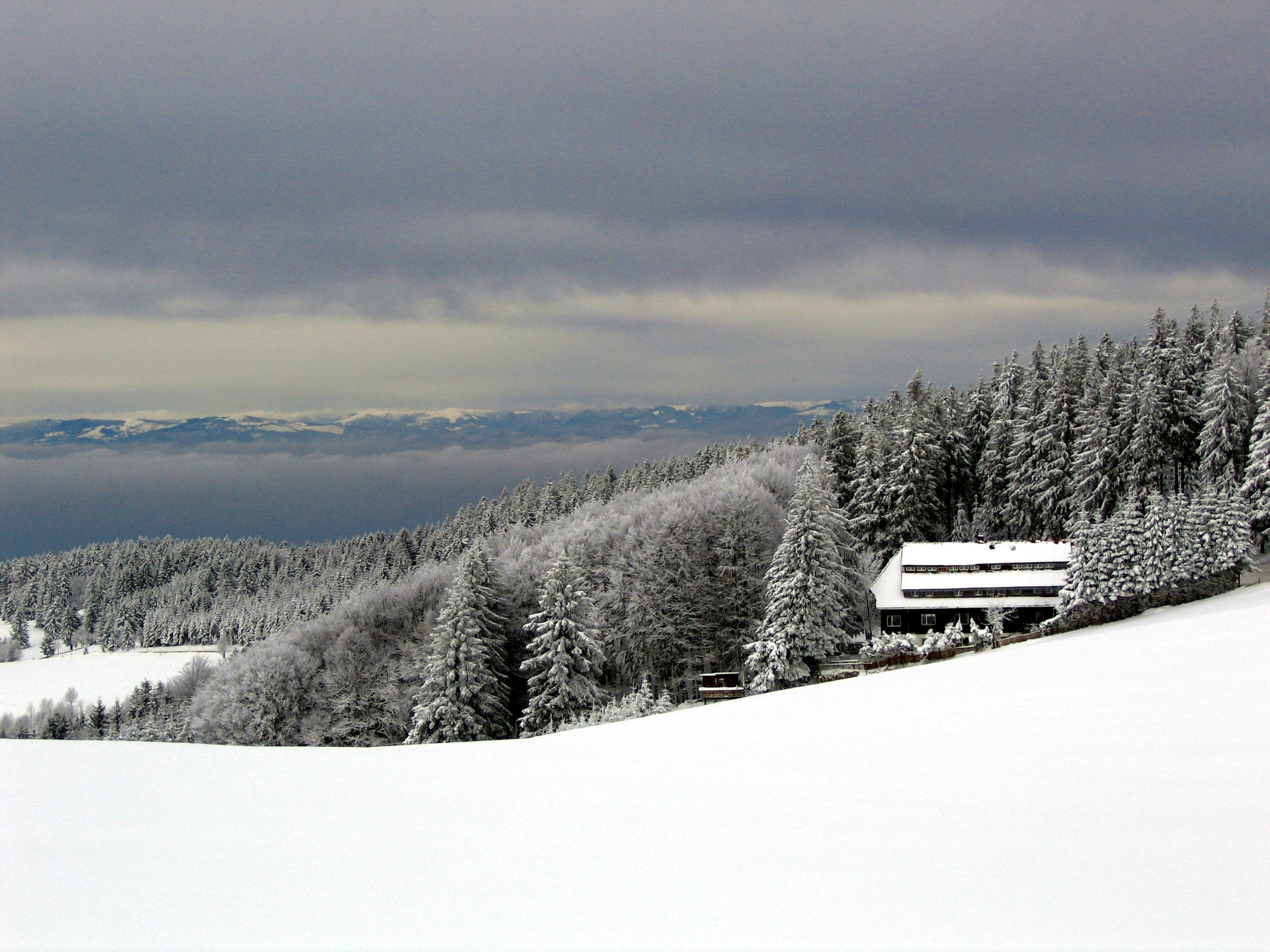
Winter on the Schauinsland. In the background are the Vosges.

The wettest areas are the highlands around the Hornisgrinde in the north and around the Belchen and Feldberg in the south, where annual rainfall reaches 1,800–2,100 mm. Moisture-laden Atlantic westerlies dump about as much rain in the Northern Black Forest, despite its lower elevation, than in the higher area of the Southern Black Forest. There, the Vosges act as a rain shield in the face of the prevailing winds. On the exposed east side of the Central Black Forest, it is much drier; the annual rainfall there is about 750 L/m^{2}.

The higher elevations of the Black Forest are characterized by relatively small annual fluctuations and steamed extreme values. This is the result of the frequent light winds and greater cloud cover in summer. During the winter months, frequent high pressure means that the summits are often bathed in sunshine, while the valleys disappear under a thick blanket of fog as a result of pockets of cold air (temperature inversion).

== Tourism and transport ==
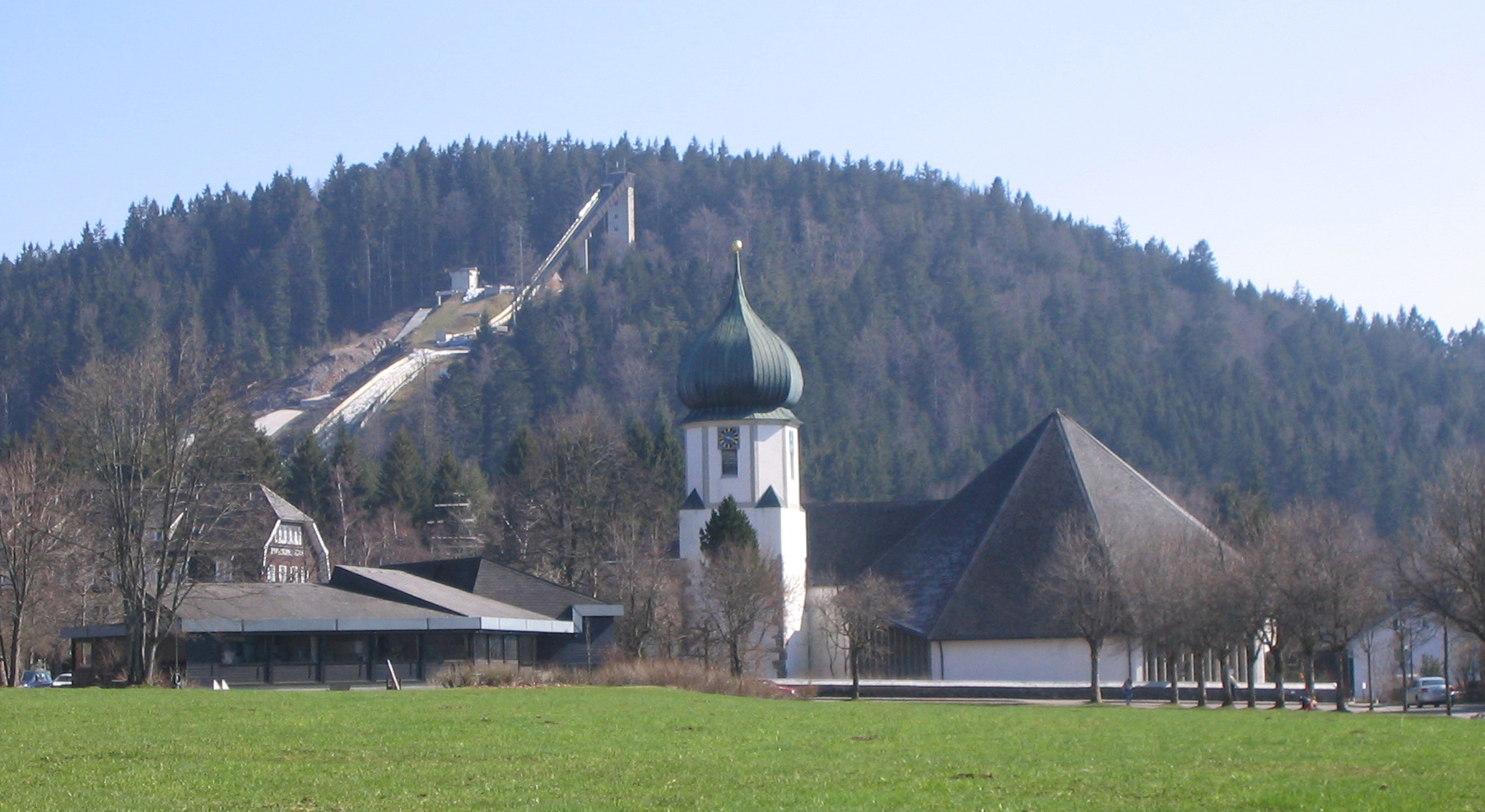
Hinterzarten in the Southern Black Forest: church and Adler ski jump

The main industry of the Black Forest is tourism. Black Forest Tourism (Schwarzwald Tourismus) assesses that there are around 140,000 direct full-time jobs in the tourist sector and around 34.8 million tourist overnight stays in 2009. In spring, summer and autumn an extensive network of hiking trails and mountain bike routes enable different groups of people to use the natural region. In winter, it is the various types of winter sport that come to the fore. There are facilities for both downhill and Nordic skiing in many places.

=== Tourist attractions ===
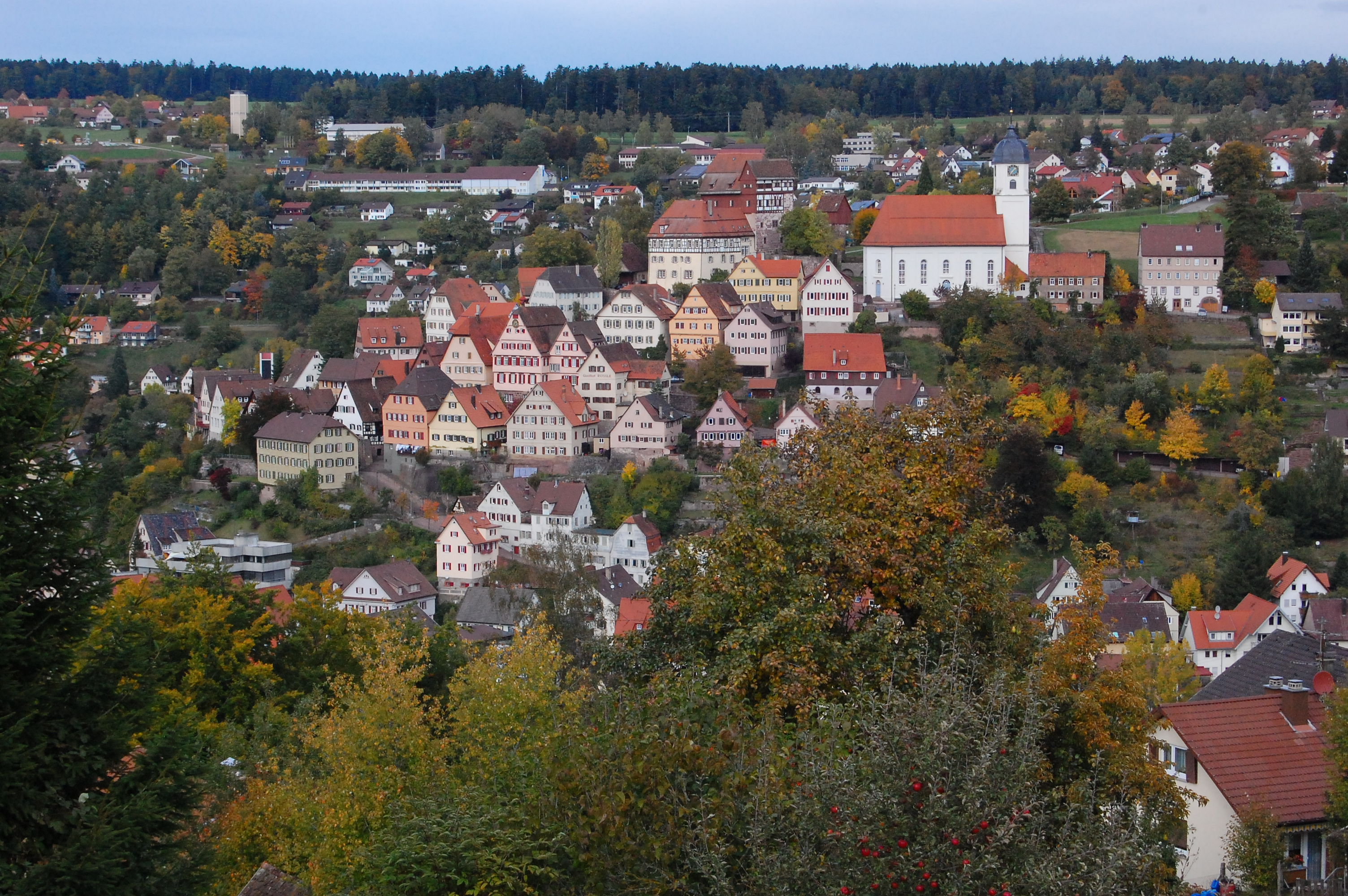
The Altstadt of Altensteig in the Northern Black Forest

The most heavily frequented tourist destinations and resorts in the Black Forest are the Titisee and the Schluchsee. Both lakes offer opportunities for water sports like diving and windsurfing. The Mummelsee is a recreational lake and a starting point for a number of hiking trails including the Kunstpfad am Mummelsee ("sculpture trail at the Mummelsee"). The Murg valley, the Kinzig valley, the Triberg Waterfalls and the Open Air Museum at Vogtsbauernhof are also popular. Lookout mountains include the Feldberg, the Belchen, the Kandel and the Schauinsland in the Southern Black Forest; and the Hornisgrinde, the Schliffkopf, the Hohloh, the Merkur and the Teufelsmühle in the Northern Black Forest. The height differences in the mountains are used in many places for hang gliding and paragliding.

One often visited town is Baden-Baden with its thermal baths and festival hall. Other thermal baths are found in the spa resorts of Badenweiler, Bad Herrenalb, Bad Wildbad, Bad Krozingen, Bad Liebenzell and Bad Bellingen. From the beginning of the 19th century, the desire for spa and bathing resorts arose in all of Central Europe because of the increasing economic potential, increasing mobility and the use of advertising. The Neo-renaissance style Friedrichsbad and the Palais Thermal are examples for spas built in this era.

Other tourist destinations are the old imperial town of Gengenbach, the former county towns of Wolfach, Schiltach and Haslach im Kinzigtal and the flower and wine village of Sasbachwalden at the foot of the Hornisgrinde. Picturesque old towns may be visited in Altensteig, Dornstetten, Freiburg im Breisgau, Gernsbach, Villingen and Zell am Harmersbach. Baiersbronn is a centre of gastronomic excellence, Freudenstadt is built around the largest market place in Germany. Gersbach's floral displays have won awards as the German Golden Village of 2004 and the European Golden Village of 2007.

Noted for their fine interiors are the former monastery of St. Blasien as well as the abbeys of Sankt Trudpert, St. Peter and St. Märgen. Alpirsbach Abbey and the ruined Hirsau Abbey were built of red sandstone in the Hirsau style. Another idyllic rural edifice is Wittichen Abbey near Schenkenzell.

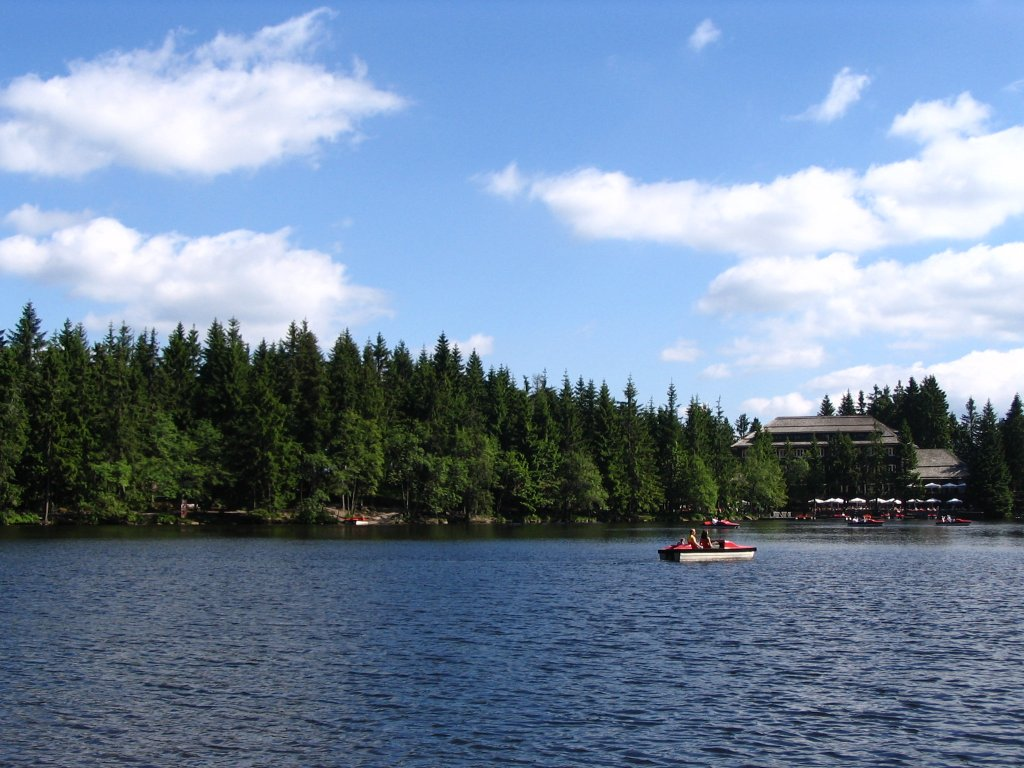
The Mummelsee along the Black Forest High Road

There are well known winter sports areas around the Feldberg, near Todtnau with its FIS downhill ski run of Fahler Loch and in Hinterzarten, a centre and talent forge for German ski jumpers. In the Northern Black Forest, the winter-sports areas are concentrated along the Black Forest High Road and on the ridge between the Murg and Enz rivers around Kaltenbronn.

=== Hiking trails ===
The Black Forest has a great number of very varied trails; some of pan-regional significance. The European long-distance path E1 crosses the Black Forest following the routes of some of the local long-distance paths. Their framework is a network of long-distance paths with main routes and side branches, many of which were laid out in the early 20th century by the Black Forest Club (Schwarzwaldverein). The best known of these is the challenging West Way (Westweg) with its many steep inclines. After 1950, circular walks were constructed to meet the changing demand, initially from the relatively dense railway network and, later, mainly from locally established hiking car parks. Currently, special, more experience-oriented themed paths are being laid out, such as the Dornstetten Barefoot Park (Barfußpark Dornstetten), the Park of All Senses (Park mit allen Sinnen) in Gutach (Black Forest Railway), as well as those designed to bring the walker more directly in contact with nature (e.g. the Schluchtensteig). Roads and wide forest tracks are thus less often used than hitherto.

There are numerous shorter paths suitable for day walks, as well as mountain biking and cross-country skiing trails. The total network of tracks amounts to around 23,000 kilometres (14,000 mi), and is maintained and overseen by volunteers of the Black Forest Club (figures from Bremke, 1999, p. 9), which is the second largest German hiking association. As of 2021, the club counts 65,000 members.

Notable hiking trails
West Way (Westweg) Pforzheim–Basel; Middle Way (Mittelweg) Pforzheim-Waldshut; East Way (Ostweg) Pforzheim-Schaffhausen; Rottweil-Lahr Trail (Querweg Rottweil-Lahr) (4 days); Gengenbach-Alpirsbach Trail (Querweg Gengenbach-Alpirsbach) (2–3 days); Hansjakob Way I (Hansjakobweg I, circular walk, 3 days); Hansjakob Way II (circular walk, 4 days); Murgleiter (5 days, premium trail)	Gernsbach Circular Walk (Gernsbacher Runde, 2–3 days, premium trail); Schluchtensteig (long-distance path, 5–6 days); Baiersbronn Lake Trail (Baiersbronner Seensteig) (circular walk, 5 days); Freiburg-Lake Constance Trail (Querweg Freiburg-Bodensee) (6–7 days); Kandel Ridgway (Kandelhöhenweg), Oberkirch–Freiburg (5 days); Two Valleys Trail (Zweitälersteig) (5 days); Black Forest-Swabian Jura-Allgäu Way (Schwarzwald-Schwäbische-Alb-Allgäu-Weg), also Main Path (Hauptwanderweg) 5, runs for over 311 kilometres into the Allgäu

=== Museums in the Black Forest ===
==== Culture and crafts ====
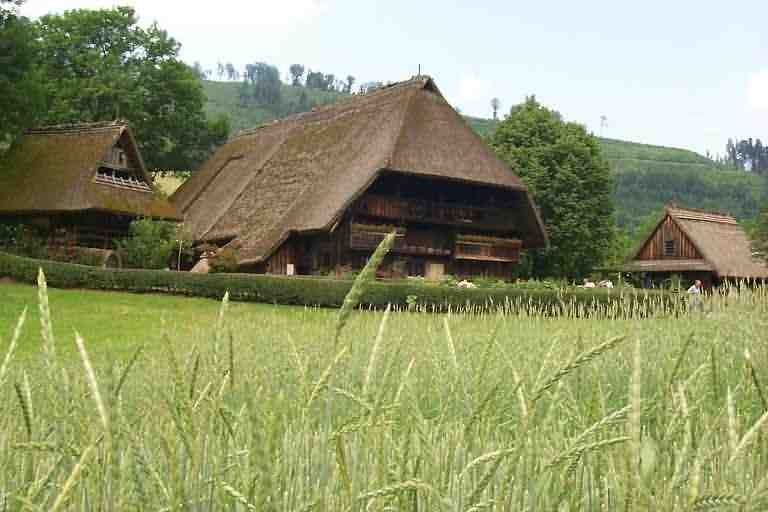
The Vogtsbauernhof (1612) of the Black Forest Open Air Museum in the Gutach valley

The Black Forest Open Air Museum at the Vogtsbauernhof farm in Gutach has original Black Forest houses offering insights into farming life of the 16th and 17th centuries. The buildings were dismantled at their original sites, the individual pieces numbered and then re-erected to exactly the same plan in the museum. The open-air museum shows the life of 16th and 17th century farmers in the region featuring the Vogtsbauernhof which dates back to 1612.

The German Clock Museum in Furtwangen gives a comprehensive cross-section of the history of the watchmaking and clockmaking industries.

From this early precision engineering a formerly important phonographic industry developed in the 20th century; the history of leisure electronics is presented in the German Phono Museum in St. Georgen.

The Schüttesäge Museum in Schiltach has information and living history demonstrations covering the themes of lumbering and timber rafting in the Kinzig valley as well as tanning.

The Black Forest Costume Museum in Haslach im Kinzigtal offers an overview of the traditional costume of the whole of the Black Forest and its peripheral regions. Also located in Haslach: the Hansjakob Museum and the Hansjakob Archive with numerous works of the writer, priest, politician, historian and chronicler, Heinrich Hansjakob.

==== Nature and science ====
The MiMa Mineralogy and Mathematics Museum in Oberwolfach houses minerals and mining exhibits from the whole of the Black Forest and links them to mathematical explanations.

=== Infrastructure ===
==== Road transport ====
Several tourist routes run through the Black Forest. Well known holiday routes are the Black Forest High Road (B 500) and the German Clock Road.

Thanks to its winding country roads, the Black Forest is a popular destination for motorcyclists. This arm of tourism is controversial due to the high number of accidents and the wide-ranging noise pollution and has been restricted through the introduction of speed limits and by placing certain roads out of bounds. For example, since 1984, motorcyclists have been banned from using the mountain-racing route on the Schauinsland during summer weekends.

==== Railway transport ====
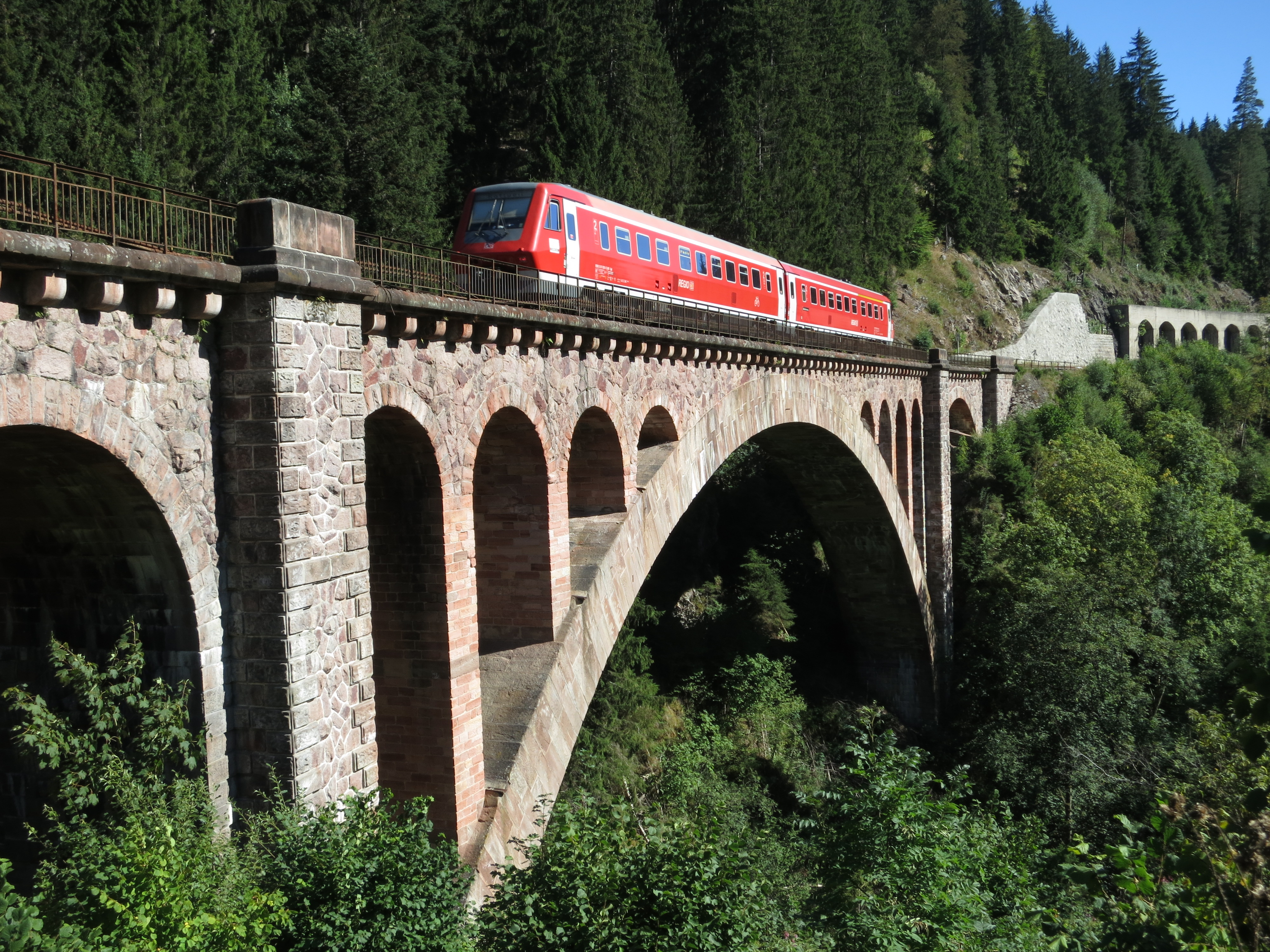
The Gutach bridge on the Höllental Railway

The whole of the Black Forest was once linked by railway. In the eastern part of the Northern Black Forest by the Enz Valley Railway from Pforzheim to Bad Wildbad, by the Nagold Valley Railway from Pforzheim via Calw and Nagold to Horb am Neckar, by the Württemberg Black Forest Railway from Stuttgart to Calw and the Gäu Railway from Stuttgart to Freudenstadt or its present-day section from Eutingen to Freudenstadt.

Many railway lines run from the Rhine Plain up the valleys into the Black Forest: the Alb Valley Railway runs from Karlsruhe to Bad Herrenalb, the Murg Valley Railway from Rastatt to Freudenstadt, the Acher Valley Railway from Achern to Ottenhöfen im Schwarzwald and the Rench Valley Railway from Appenweier to Bad Griesbach. The Baden Black Forest Railway has linked Offenburg with Konstanz on Lake Constance since 1873, running via Hausach, Triberg, St. Georgen, Villingen and Donaueschingen. In Hausach the Kinzig Valley Railway branches off to Freudenstadt, in Denzlingen the Elz Valley Railway peels off towards Elzach, the Höllental Railway runs from Freiburg im Breisgau through the Höllental valley to Donaueschingen, the Münstertal Railway from Bad Krozingen to Münstertal, the Kander Valley Railway from Haltingen near Basel through the Kander valley to Kandern and the Wiesen Valley Railway from Basel to Zell im Wiesental.

The Three Lakes Railway branches off at the Titisee from the Höllental Railway and runs to the Windgfällweiher and the Schluchsee. The Wutach Valley Railway runs along the border between Baden-Württemberg and Switzerland, linking Waldshut-Tiengen with Immendingen on the Black Forest Railway.

Most of these routes are still busy today, whilst some are popular heritage lines.

=== Administration ===
Since January 2006, the Black Forest Tourist organisation, Schwarzwald Tourismus, whose head office is in Freiburg, has been responsible for the administration of tourism in the 320 municipalities of the region. Hitherto there had been four separate tourist associations.

=== Points of interest ===
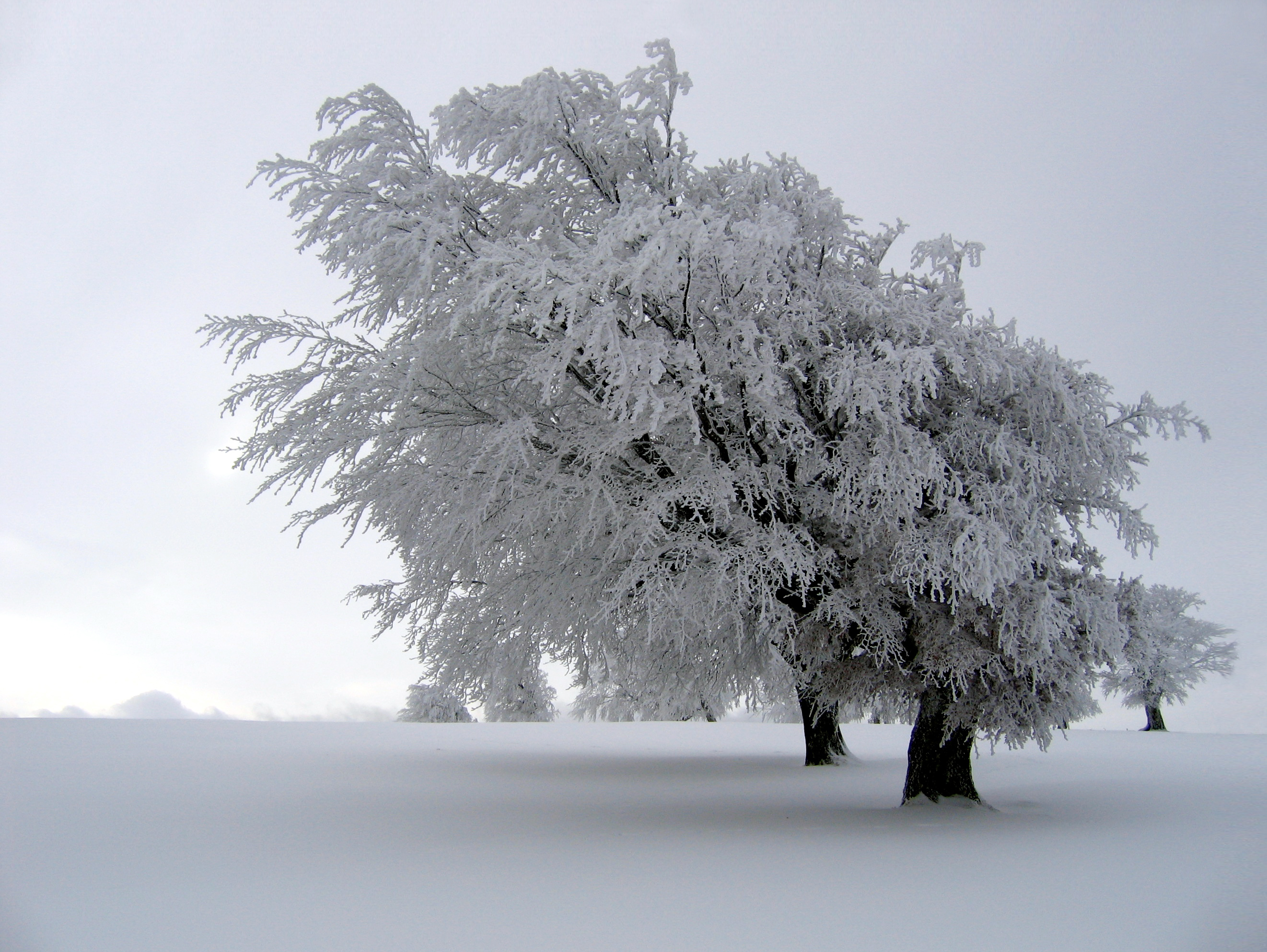
Winter on Schauinsland: famous "Windbuchen" beeches bent by the wind

There are many historic towns in the Black Forest. Popular tourist destinations include Baden-Baden, Freiburg, Calw (the birth town of Hermann Hesse), Gengenbach, Staufen, Schiltach, Haslach and Altensteig. Other popular destinations include such mountains as the Feldberg, the Belchen, the Kandel, and the Schauinsland; the Titisee and Schluchsee lakes; the All Saints Waterfalls; the Triberg Waterfalls, not the highest, but the most famous waterfalls in Germany; and the gorge of the River Wutach.

For drivers, the main route through the region is the fast A 5 (E35) motorway, but a variety of signposted scenic routes such as the Schwarzwaldhochstraße (60 km (37 mi), Baden-Baden to Freudenstadt), Schwarzwald Tälerstraße (100 km (62 mi), the Murg and Kinzig valleys) or Badische Weinstraße (Baden Wine Street, 160 km (99 mi), a wine route from Baden-Baden to Weil am Rhein) offers calmer driving along high roads. The last is a picturesque trip starting in the south of the Black Forest going north and includes numerous old wineries and tiny villages. Another, more specialized route is the German Clock Route, a circular route that traces the horological history of the region.

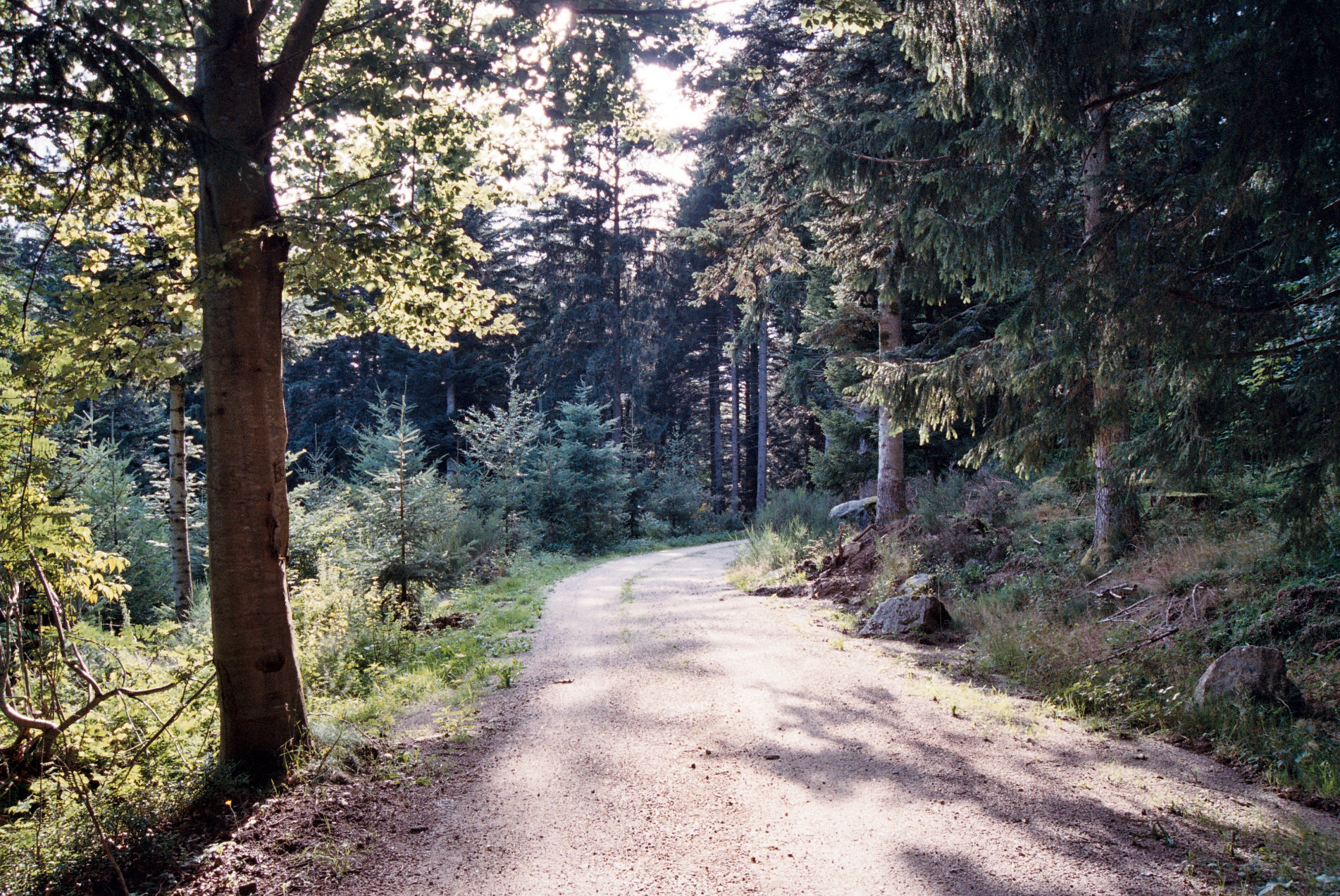
Black Forest track

Due to the rich mining history dating from medieval times (the Black Forest was one of the most important mining regions of Europe c. 1100) there are many mines re-opened to the public. Such mines may be visited in the Kinzig valley, the Suggental, the Muenster valley, and around Todtmoos.

The Black Forest was visited on several occasions by Count Otto von Bismarck during his years as Prussian and later German chancellor (1862–1890). Allegedly, he was especially interested in the Triberg Waterfalls. There is now a monument in Triberg dedicated to Bismarck, who apparently enjoyed the tranquility of the region as an escape from his day-to-day political duties in Berlin.

The Black Forest featured in the philosophical development of Martin Heidegger. Heidegger wrote and edited some of his philosophical works in a small hut in the Black Forest, and would receive visitors there for walks, including his former pupil Hannah Arendt. This hut features explicitly in his essay Building, Dwelling, Thinking. His walks in the Black Forest are supposed to have inspired the title of his collection of essays Holzwege, translated as Off The Beaten Track.

== Economy and craftsmanship ==
=== Mining ===
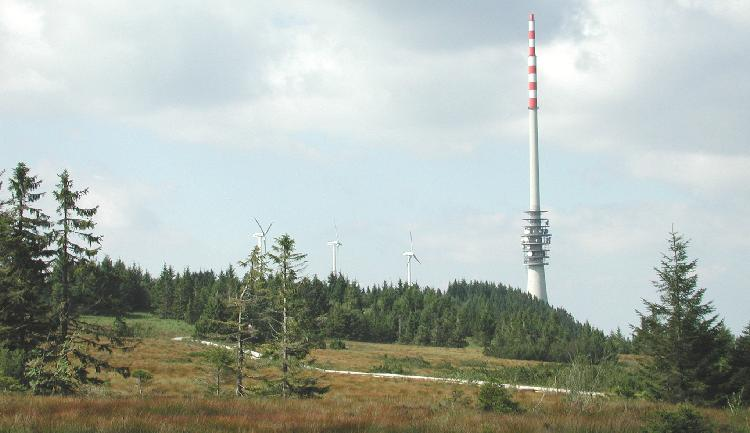
Hornisgrinde plateau and raised bog (2004). Behind: transmission mast and wind generators

Mining developed in the Black Forest due to its ore deposits, which were often lode-shaped. The formation of these deposits (Schauinsland Pit: zinc, lead, about 700–1000 g silver/ton of lead; baryte, fluorite, less lead and zinc in the Kinzig valley; BiCoNi ores near Wittichen, uranium discovered in the Krunkelbach valley near Menzenschwand but never officially mined) often used to be linked to the intrusion of Carboniferous granite in the para- and orthogneisses. More recent research has revealed that most of these lode fillings are much younger (Triassic to Tertiary). Economic deposits of other minerals included: fluorite in the Northern Black Forest near Pforzheim, baryte in the central region near Freudenstadt, fluorite along with lead and silver near Wildschapbach, baryte and fluorite in the Rankach valley and near Ohlsbach, in the Southern Black Forest near Todtnau, Wieden and Urberg.

Small liquid magmatic deposits of nickel-magnetite gravel in norite were mined or prospected in the Hotzenwald forest near Horbach and Todtmoos. Strata-bound deposits include iron ores in the Dogger layer of the foothill zone and uranium near Müllenbach/Baden-Baden. Stone coal is only found near Berghaupten and Diersburg, but was always only of local importance.

Chronology: Stone Age mining of haematite (as red pigment) near Sulzburg. By the 5th and 6th centuries B.C. iron ore was being mined by the Celts in the Northern Black Forest (for example in Neuenbürg). Especially in the Middle Black Forest, but also in the south (for example in the Münster valley) ore mining was already probably taking place in Roman times (mining of silver and lead ore; evidence of this at Sulzburg and possibly Badenweiler). Until the High Middle Ages the High Black Forest was practically unsettled. In the course of inland colonisation in the Late High Middle Ages even the highlands were cultivated by settlers from the abbeys (St. Peter's, St. Märgen's). In the Late High Middle Ages (from about 1100) mining experienced another boom, especially around Todtnau, in the Münster and Suggen valleys and, later, on the Schauinsland too. It is believed that around 800–1,000 miners lived and worked in the Münster valley until the end of the Middle Ages. After the Plague, which afflicted the valley in 1516, the German Peasants' War (1524–26) and the Thirty Years' War, mining in the region declined until just a few pits remained.

An important mining area was the Kinzig valley and its side valleys. The small mining settlement of Wittichen near Schenkenzell in the upper Kinzig valley had many pits from which miners dug baryte, cobalt and silver of many kinds. A circular, geological footpath runs today past the old pits and tips.

Another boom began in the early 18th century after the loss of the Alsace to France. It lasted until the 19th century. Many pits from this period may be visited today as show mines; for example the Teufelsgrund Pit (Münstertal), the Finstergrund Pit near Wieden, the Hoffnungsstollen ("Hope Gallery") at Todtmoos, the mine in the Schauinsland, the formerly especially silver-rich Wenzel Pit in Oberwolfach and Gr. Segen Gottes ("God's Great Blessing") in Haslach-Schnellingen.

Non-ferrous metal mining in the Black Forest continued until the middle of the 20th century near Wildschapbach and on the Schauinsland (to 1954); fluorite and baryte are still mined today at the Clara Pit in the Rankach valley in Oberwolfach. Iron ores of the Dogger formation was worked until the 1970s near Ringsheim and was smelted in Kehl.

Compared with the Harz and Ore Mountains the quantities of silver extracted in the Black Forest were rather modest and reached only about ten percent of that produced in the other silver-mining regions.

There are many show mines in the Black Forest. These include: the Frischglück Pit near Neuenbürg, the Hella Glück Pit near Neubulach, the Silbergründle Pit near Seebach, the Himmlich Heer Pit near Hallwangen, the Heilige Drei Könige Pit near Freudenstadt, the Segen Gottes Pit near Haslach, the Wenzel Pit near Oberwolfach, the Caroline Pit near Sexau, the Suggental Silver Mine near Waldkirch, the Schauinsland Pit near Freiburg, the Teufelsgrund Pit near Münstertal, the Finstergrund Pit near Wieden and the Hoffnungsstollen Pit near Todtmoos.

=== Forestry ===
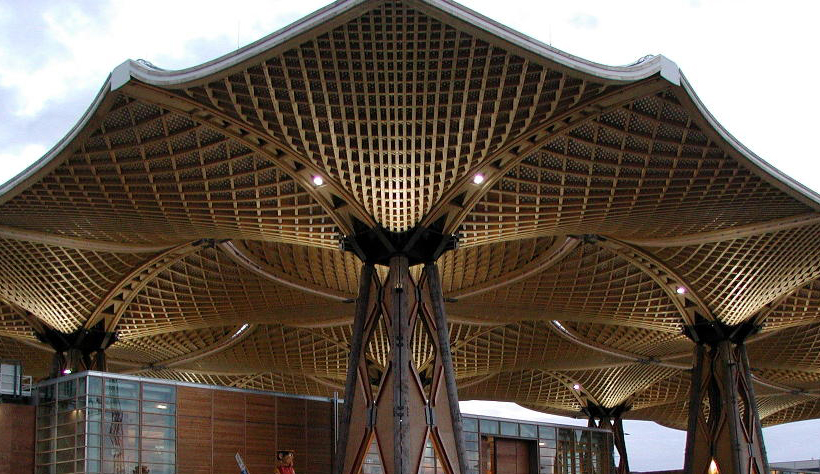
Trunks of White Fir from Gersbach hold up the largest unsupported wooden roof in the world at Expo 2000.

For several centuries logs from the Black Forest were rafted down the Enz, Kinzig, Murg, Nagold and Rhine rivers for use in the shipping industry, as construction timber and for other purposes. This branch of industry boomed in the 18th century and led to large-scale clearances. As most of the long, straight pine logs were transported downriver for shipbuilding in the Netherlands, they were referred to as "Dutchmen". The logs were used in the Netherlands, above all, as piles for house construction in the sandy and wet ground. Even today in Amsterdam large numbers of historic building are built on these posts and the reforestation of the Black Forest with spruce monocultures testifies to the destruction of the original mixed forest. With the expansion of the railway and road network as alternative transportation, rafting largely came to an end in the late 19th century.

Today, loggers harvest fir trees—especially very tall and branchless ones—mainly to ship to Japan. The global advertising impact of Expo 2000 fuelled a resurgence of timber exports. The importance of the timber resources of the Black Forest has also increased sharply recently due to the increasing demand for wood pellets for heating.

=== Glass-making, charcoal-burning and potash-mining ===
The timber resources of the Black Forest provided the basis for other sectors of the economy that have now largely disappeared. Charcoal burners (Köhler) built their wood piles (Meiler) in the woods and produced charcoal, which, like the products of the potash boilers—further processed inter alia for the glassmaking industry. The Black Forest supplied raw materials and energy for the manufacture of forest glass. This is evidenced today by a number of glassblowing houses e.g. in the Hoellental in Todtnau and Wolfach and the Forest Glass Centre in Gersbach (Schopfheim), which is open to visitors.

=== Precision-engineering, clock and jewellery manufacture ===
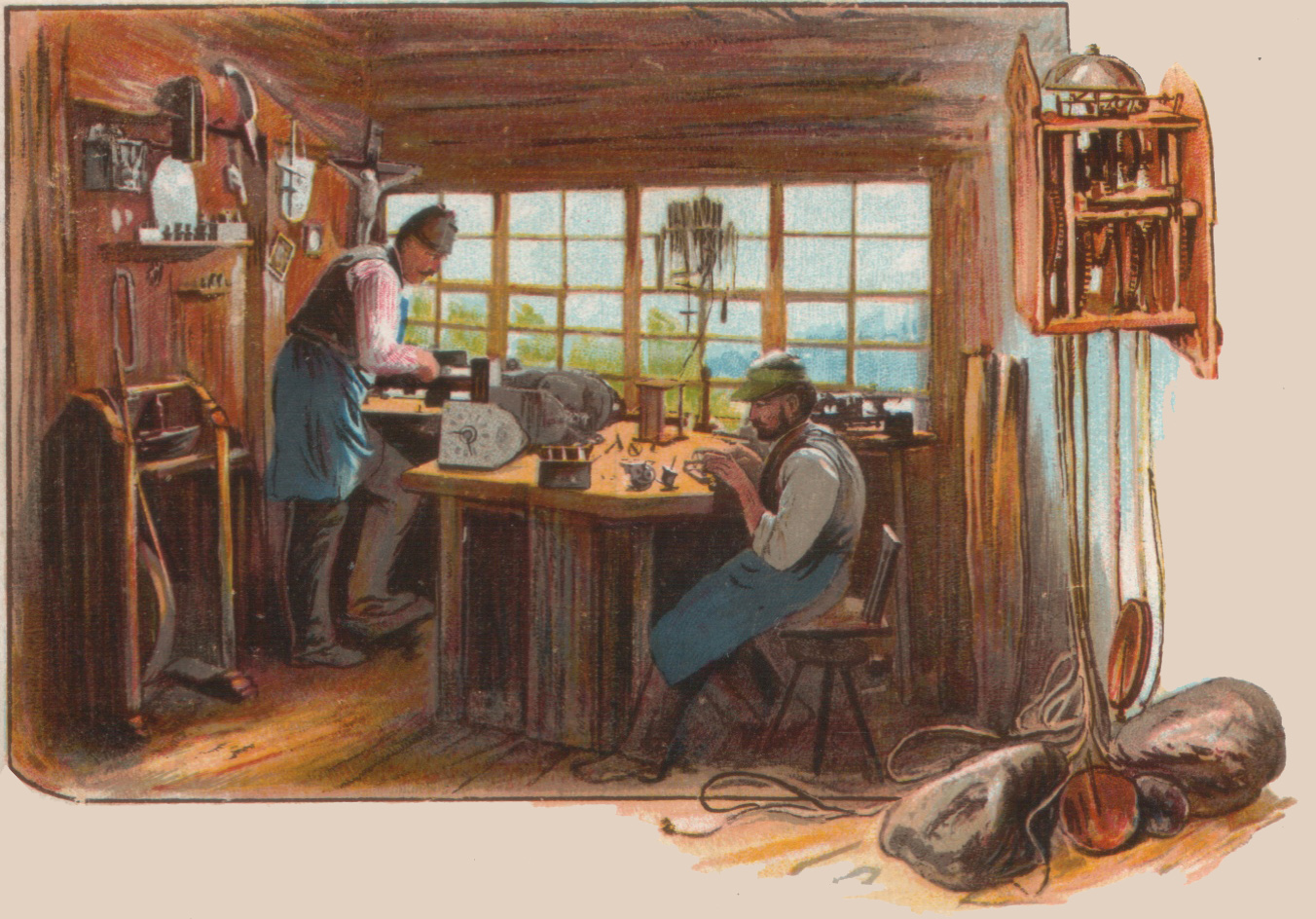
Clockmaker's workshop in a sitting room (postcard from around 1900)

In the relatively inaccessible Black Forest valleys, industrialization arrived late. In winter, many farmers made wooden cuckoo clocks to supplement their income. This developed in the 19th century into the precision engineering and watch industry, which boomed with the arrival of the railway in many of the Black Forest valleys. The initial disadvantage of their remote location, which led to the development of precision-engineered wooden handicrafts, became a competitive advantage because of their access to raw materials: timber from the forest and metal from the mines. As part of a structural support programme the Baden State Government founded the first clockmaking school in 1850 in Furtwangen to ensure that small artisans were given good training and thus better sales opportunities. Due to the increasing demand for mechanical devices, large companies such as Junghans and Kienzle became established. In the 20th century, the production of consumer electronics was developed by companies such as SABA, Dual and Becker. In the 1970s, the industry declined due to Far Eastern competition. Nevertheless, the Black Forest remains a centre for the metalworking industry and is home to many high-tech companies.

Since the start of industrialisation there have been numerous firms in Pforzheim that manufacture jewellery and work with precious metals and stones. There is also a goldsmith's school in Pforzheim.

=== Hydropower ===
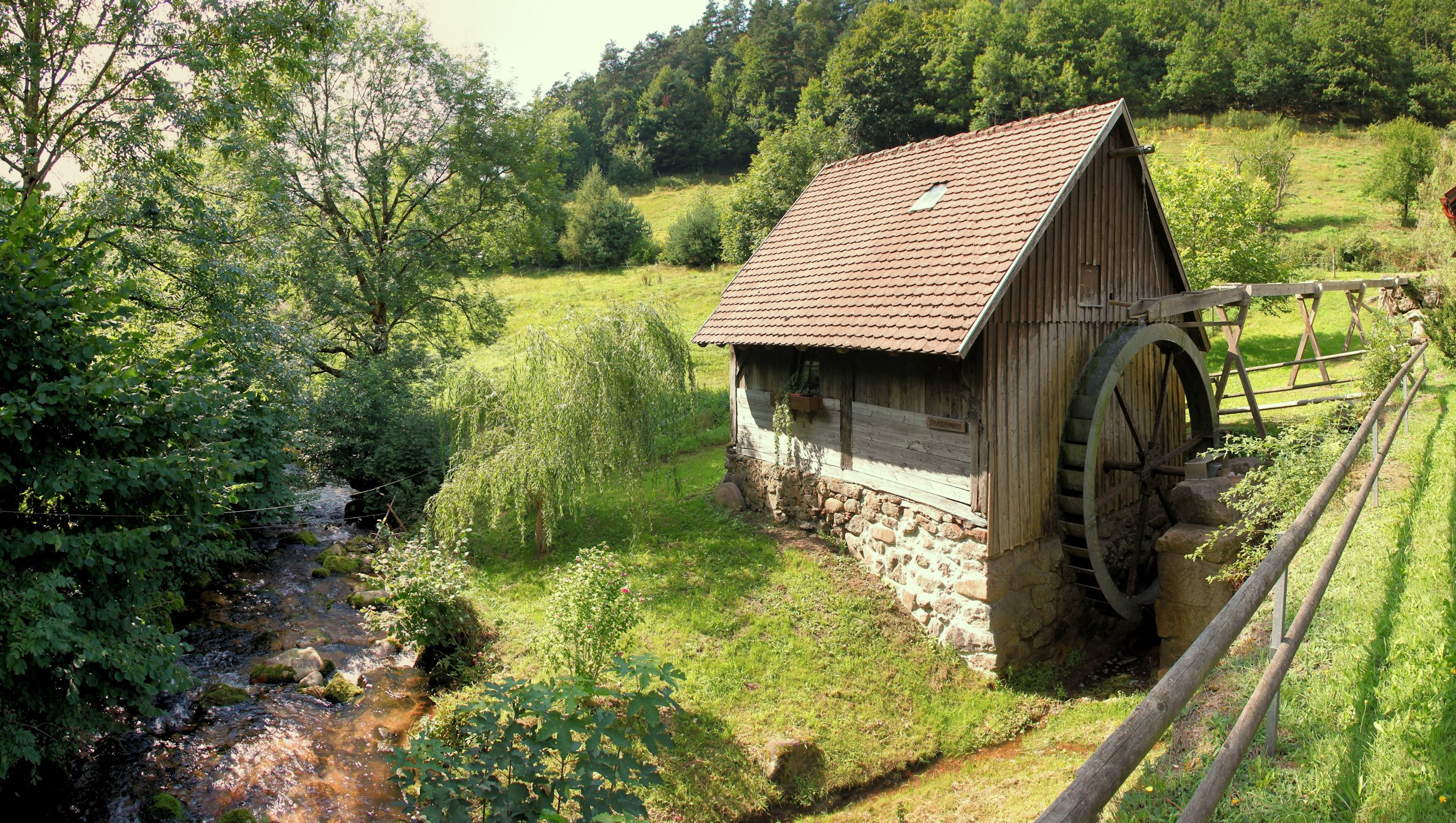
The Straßerhof Mill in Hornberg, a typical Black Forest farming mill

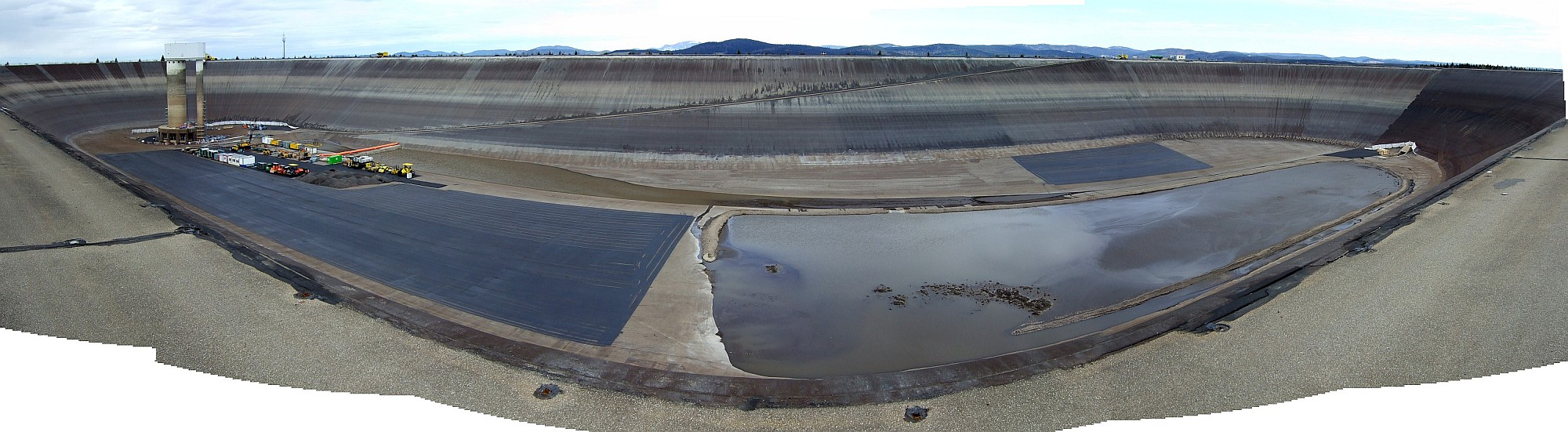
The Hornberg Basin near Herrischried, upper reservoir of the Wehr pumped storage station (emptied, May 2008)

Due to the large amounts of precipitation and elevation changes the Black Forest has significant hydropower potential. This was used until the 19th century especially for operating numerous mills, including sawmills and hammer mills and was one of the local factors in the industrialization of some Black Forest valleys.

Since the 20th century, the Black Forest has seen the large-scale generation of electrical power using run-of-the-river power plants and pumped storage power stations. From 1914 to 1926, the Rudolf Fettweis Company was established in the Murg valley in the Northern Black Forest with the construction of the Schwarzenbach Dam. In 1932, the Schluchsee reservoir, with its new dam, became the upper basin of a pumped-storage power plant. In 2013 the association of the Southern Black Forest's Schluchseewerk owned five power plants with 14 storage tanks. At the Hornberg Basin topographical conditions allow an average head of water of 625 m to drive the turbines before it flows into the Wehra Reservoir.

In the 21st century, in the wake of the Renewable Energy Sources Act, numerous smaller run-of-the-river power stations were re-opened or newly constructed.

== Notable people and residents ==
- Hans Jakob Christoffel von Grimmelshausen German novelist; lived in the Black Forest while writing his picaresque novel Simplicius Simplicissimus.
- Martin Heidegger, German philosopher, who spent much of his time in Todtnauberg, where he wrote most of Being and Time.
- Hermann Hesse, born in Calw (1877–1962), German poet and novelist
- Jürgen Klopp, football manager, who grew up in village of Glatten
- Hans Thoma, born in Bernau (1839–1924), German painter

== Gallery ==
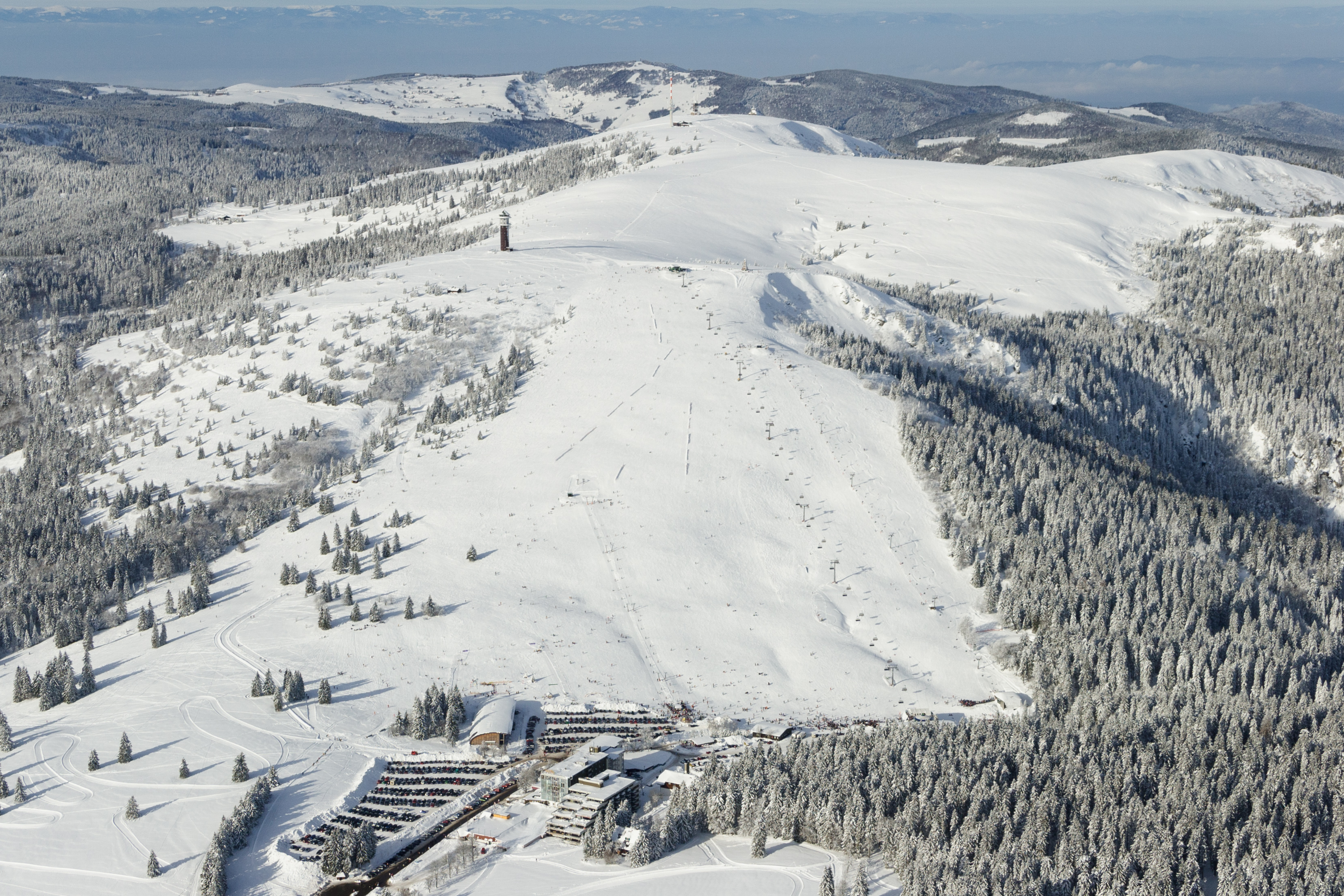
The Feldberg

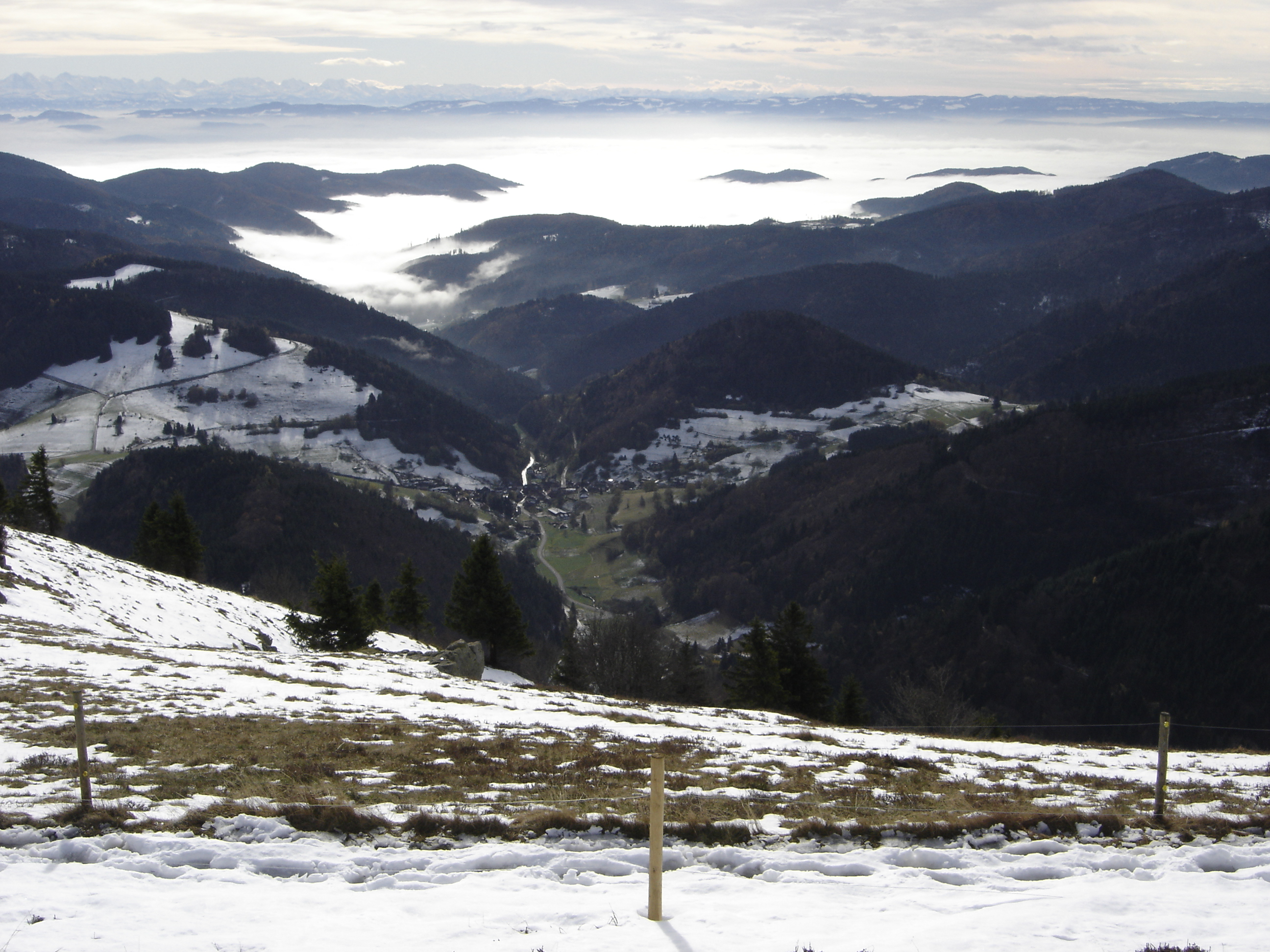
View from the Belchen towards the Alps

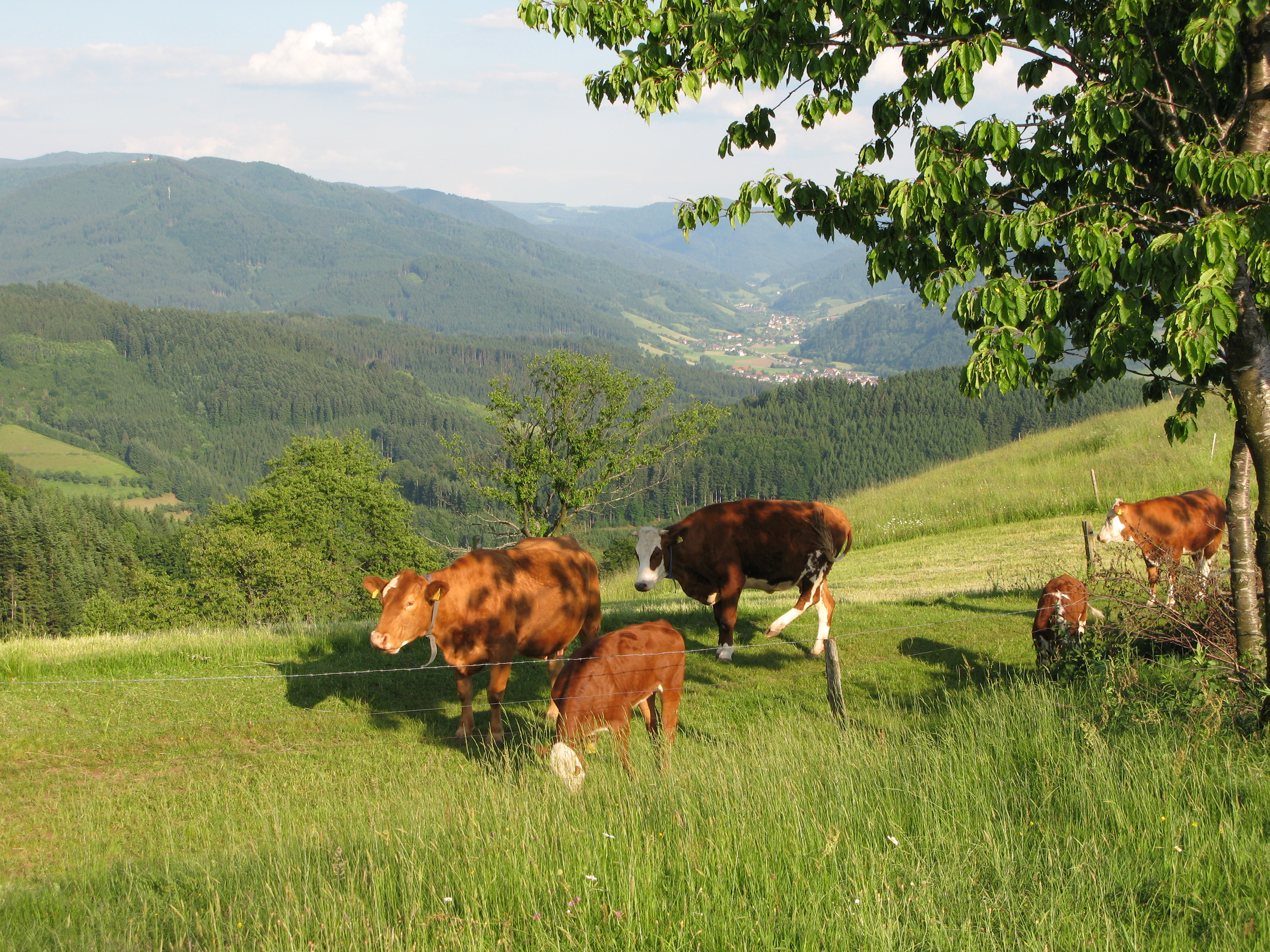
Cattle near Simonswald

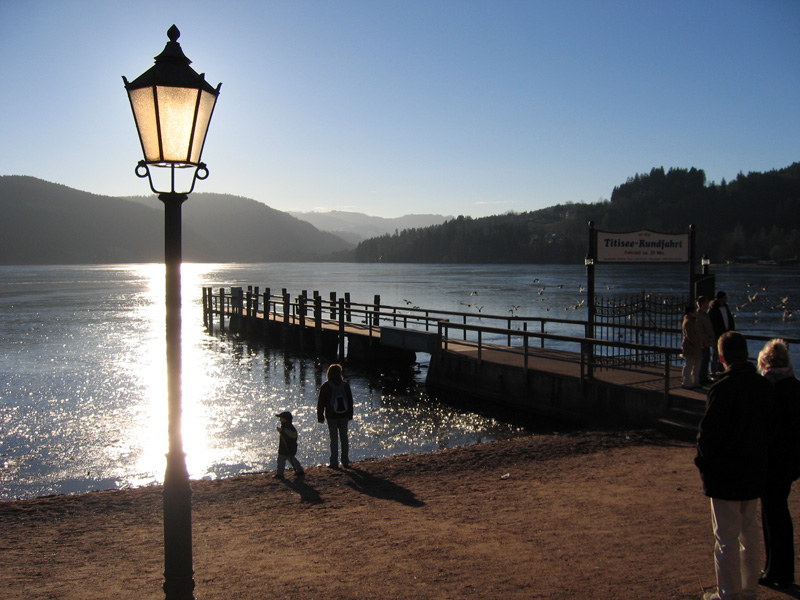
The Titisee, popular year-round

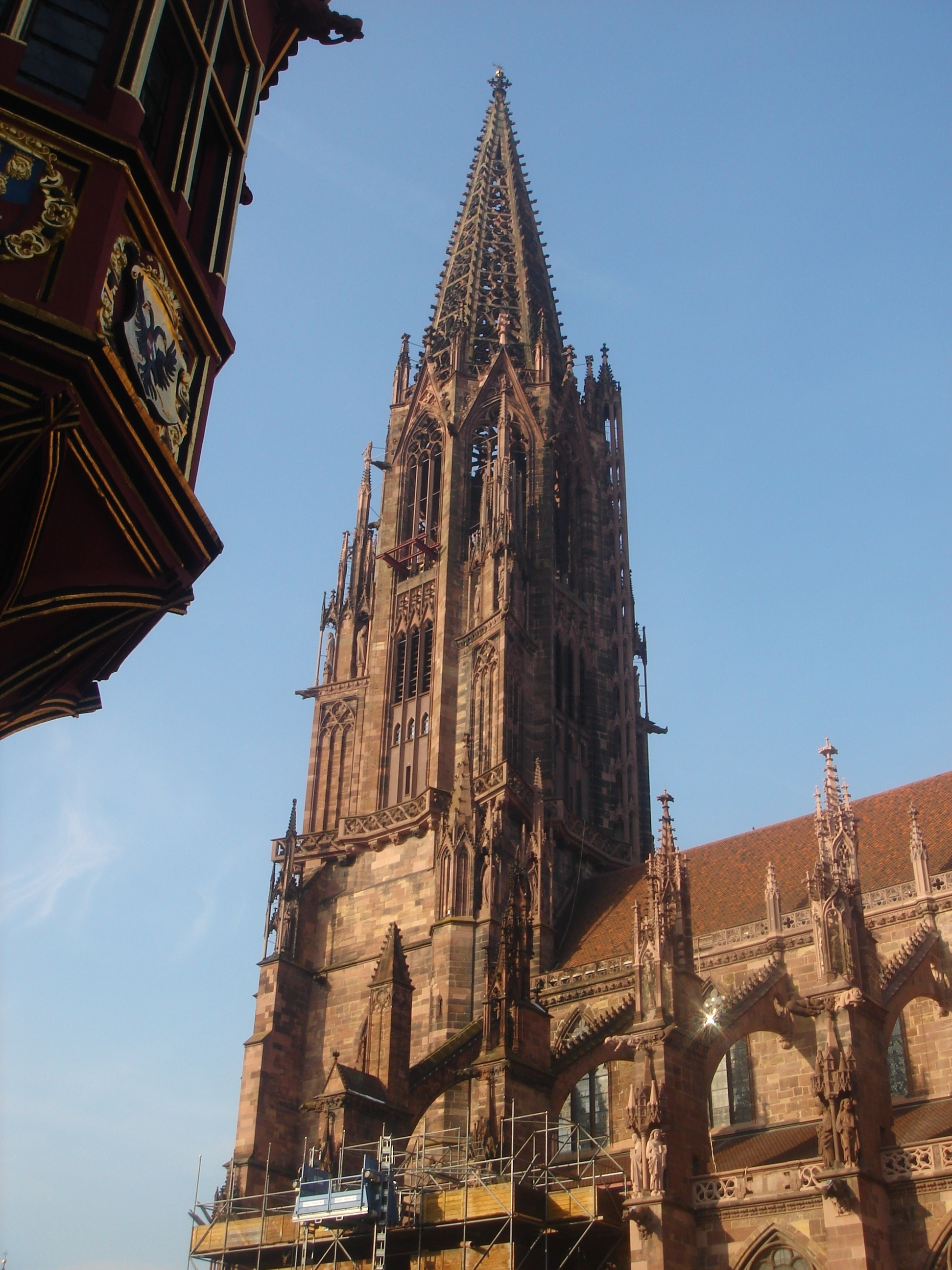
The Minster in Freiburg, the region's biggest city

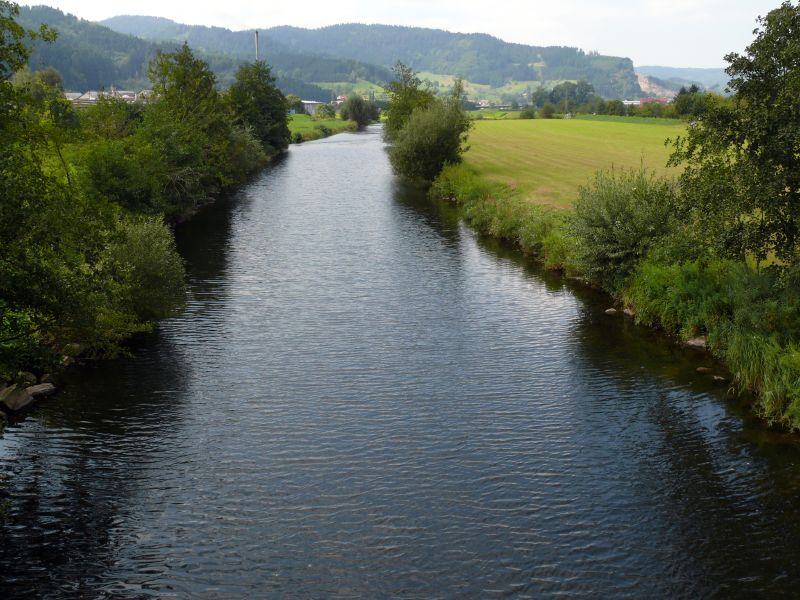
The River Kinzig passing through the Black Forest

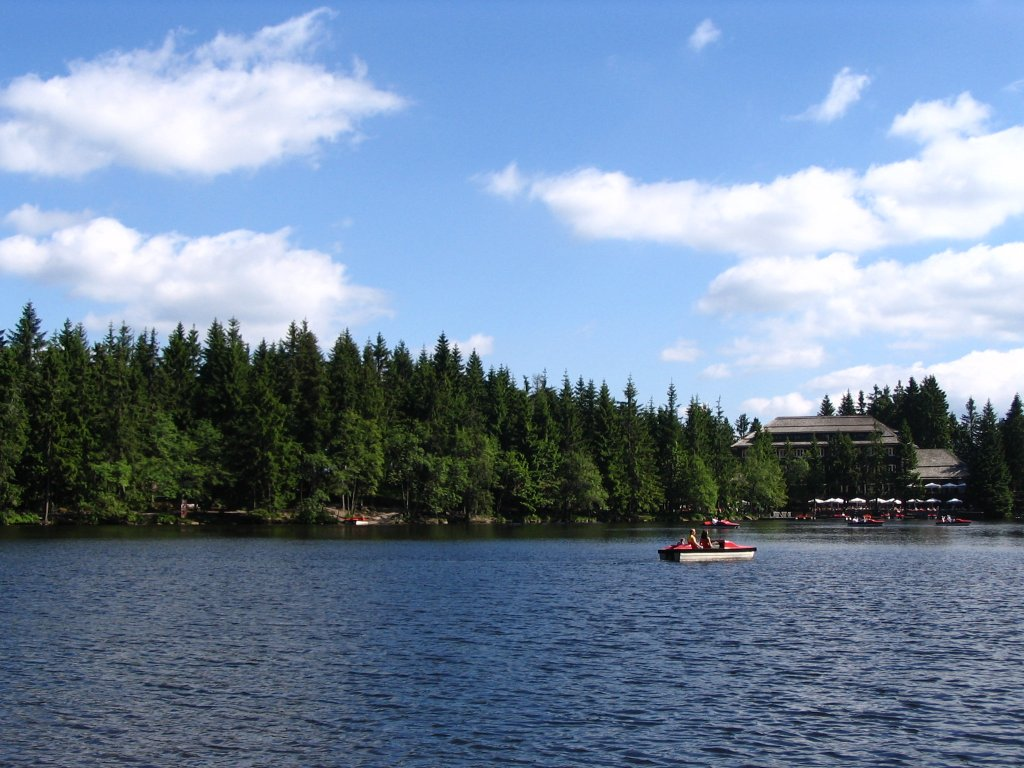
The Mummelsee

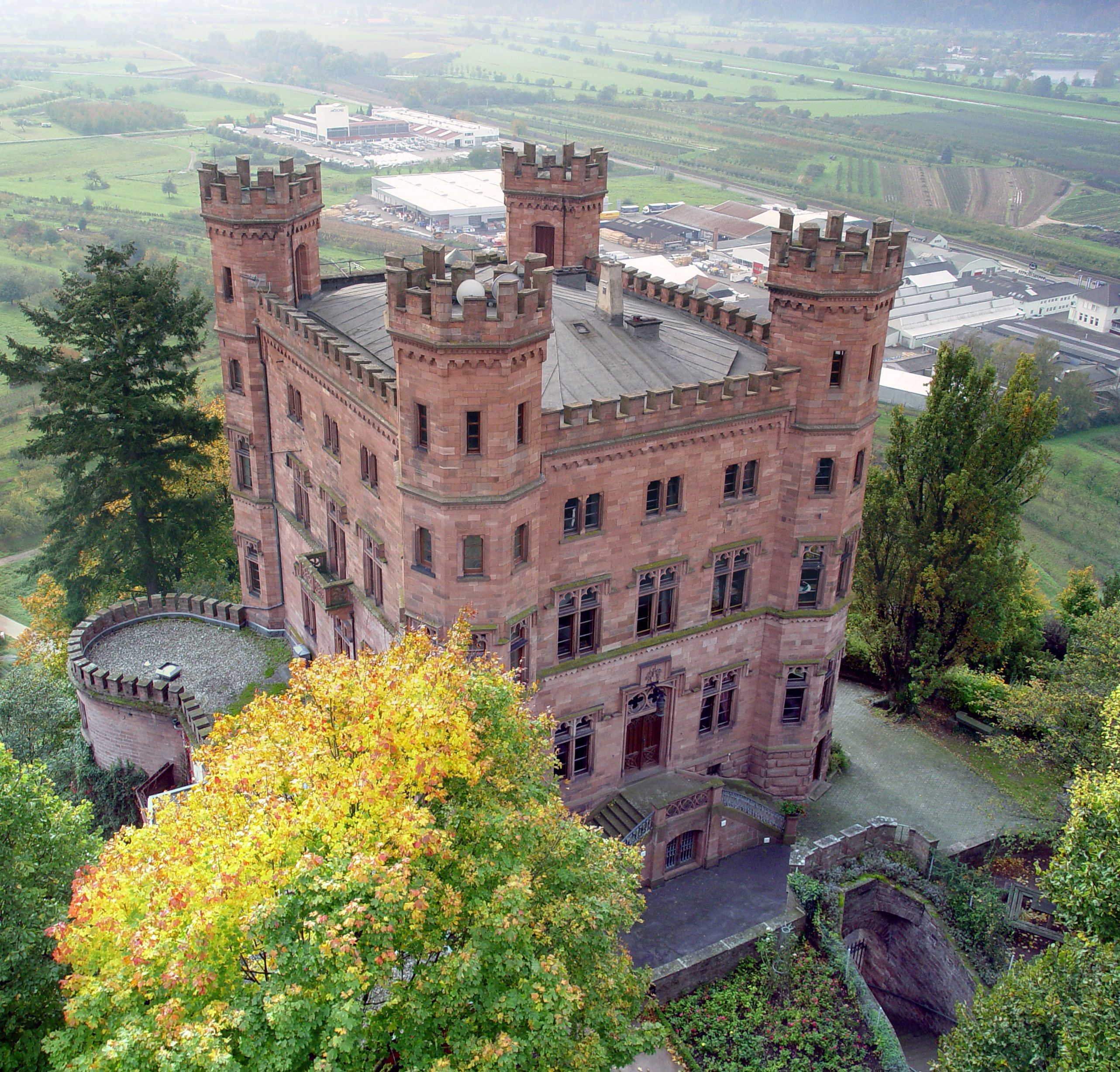
Ortenberg Castle near Offenburg (now a youth hostel)

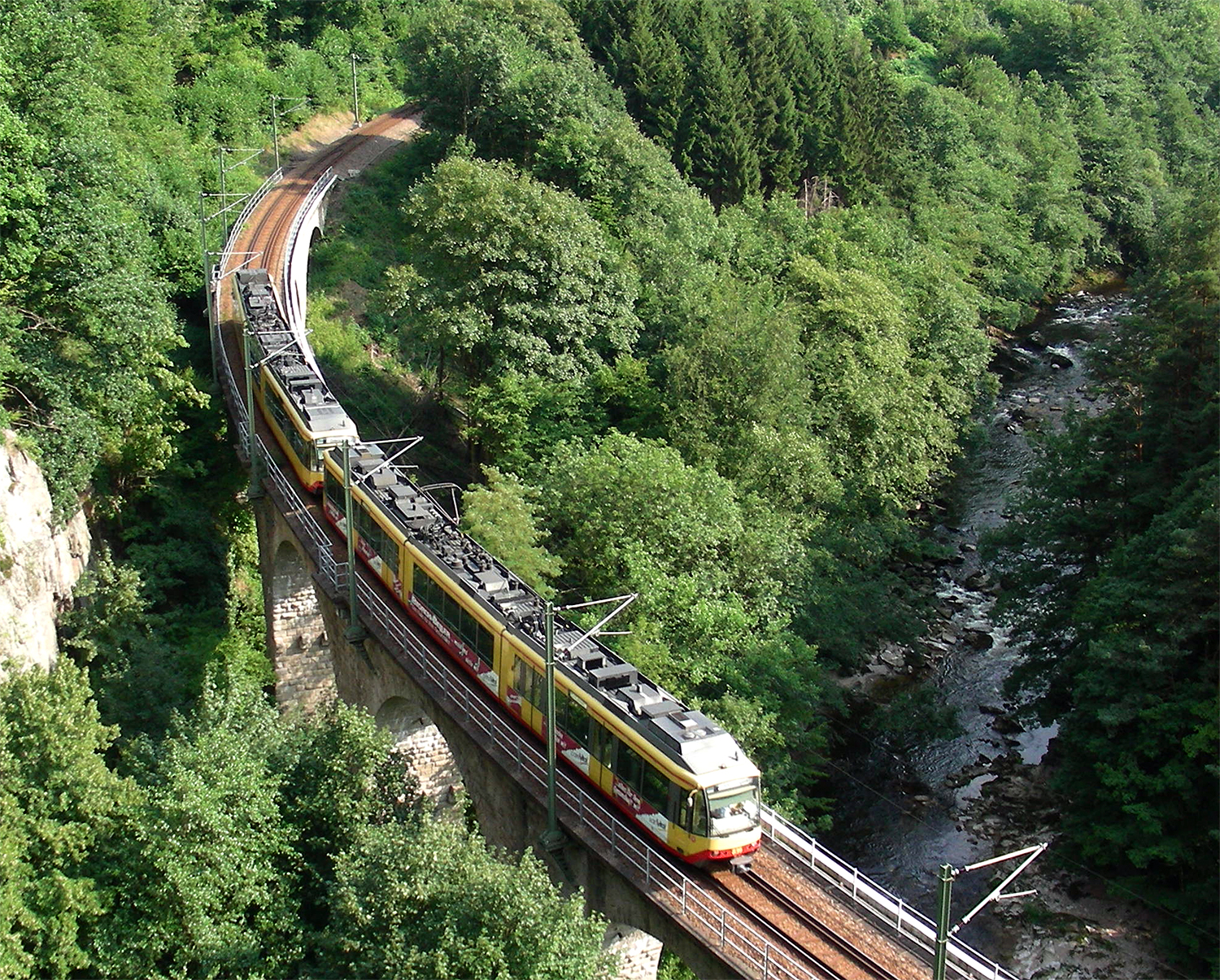
The Murg Valley Railway

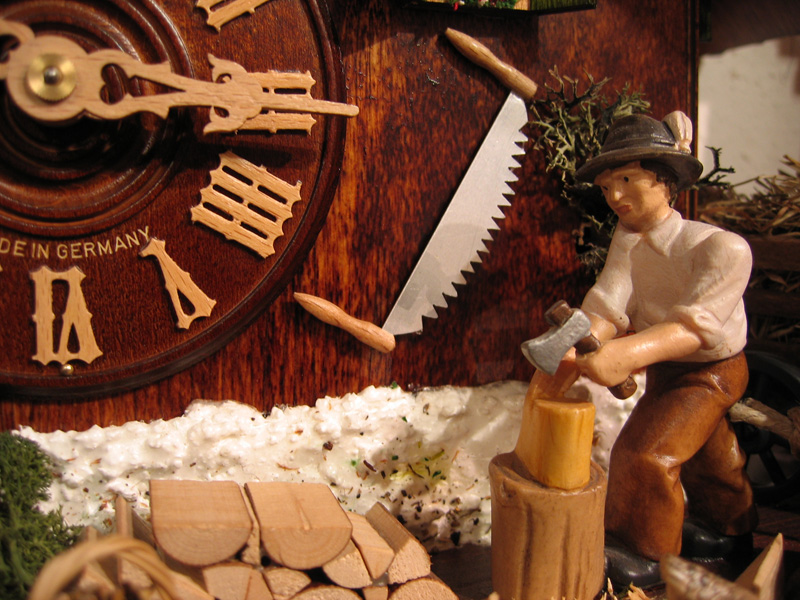
The Black Forest is known for its native clockmakers

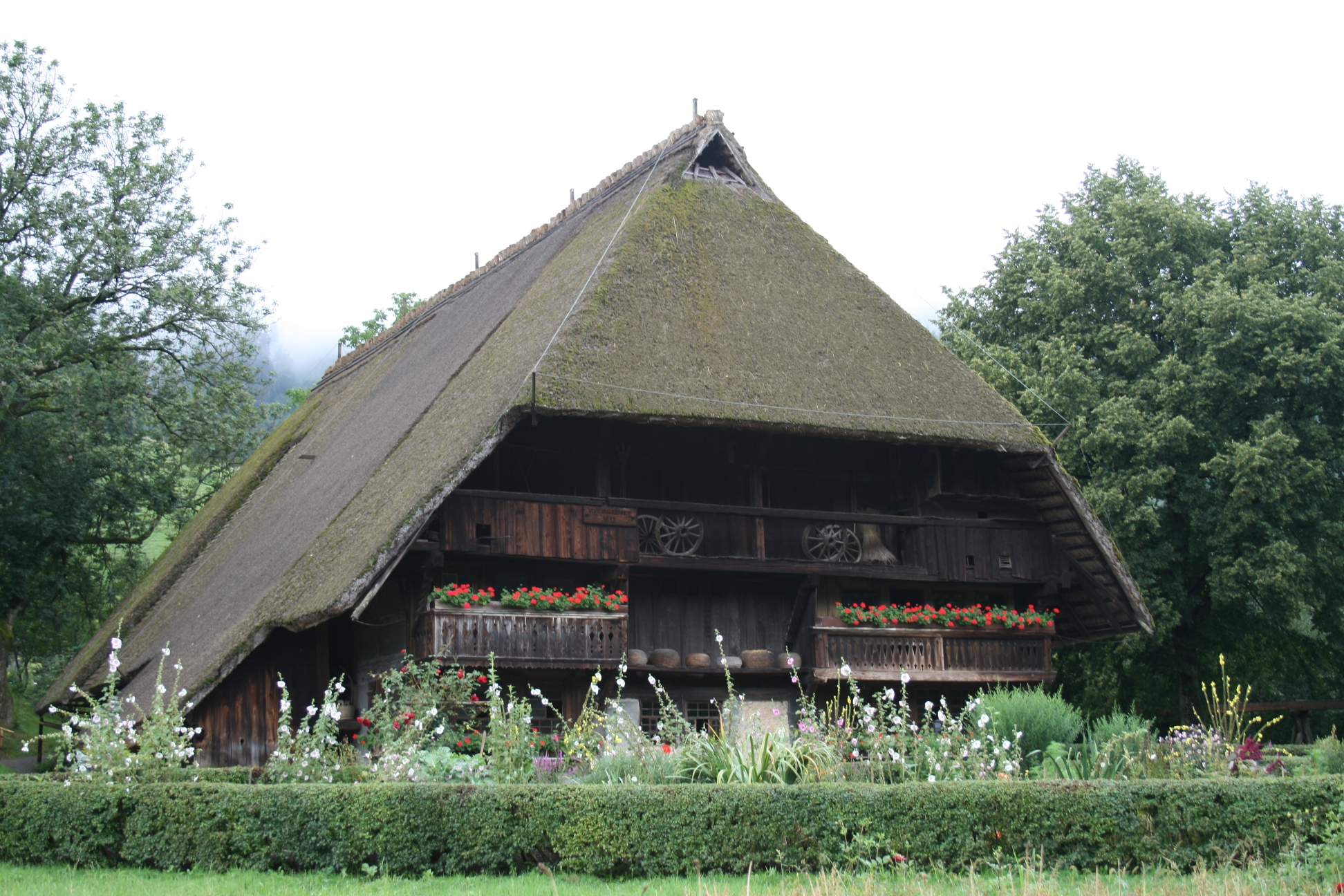
Traditional farmhouse of the Black Forest

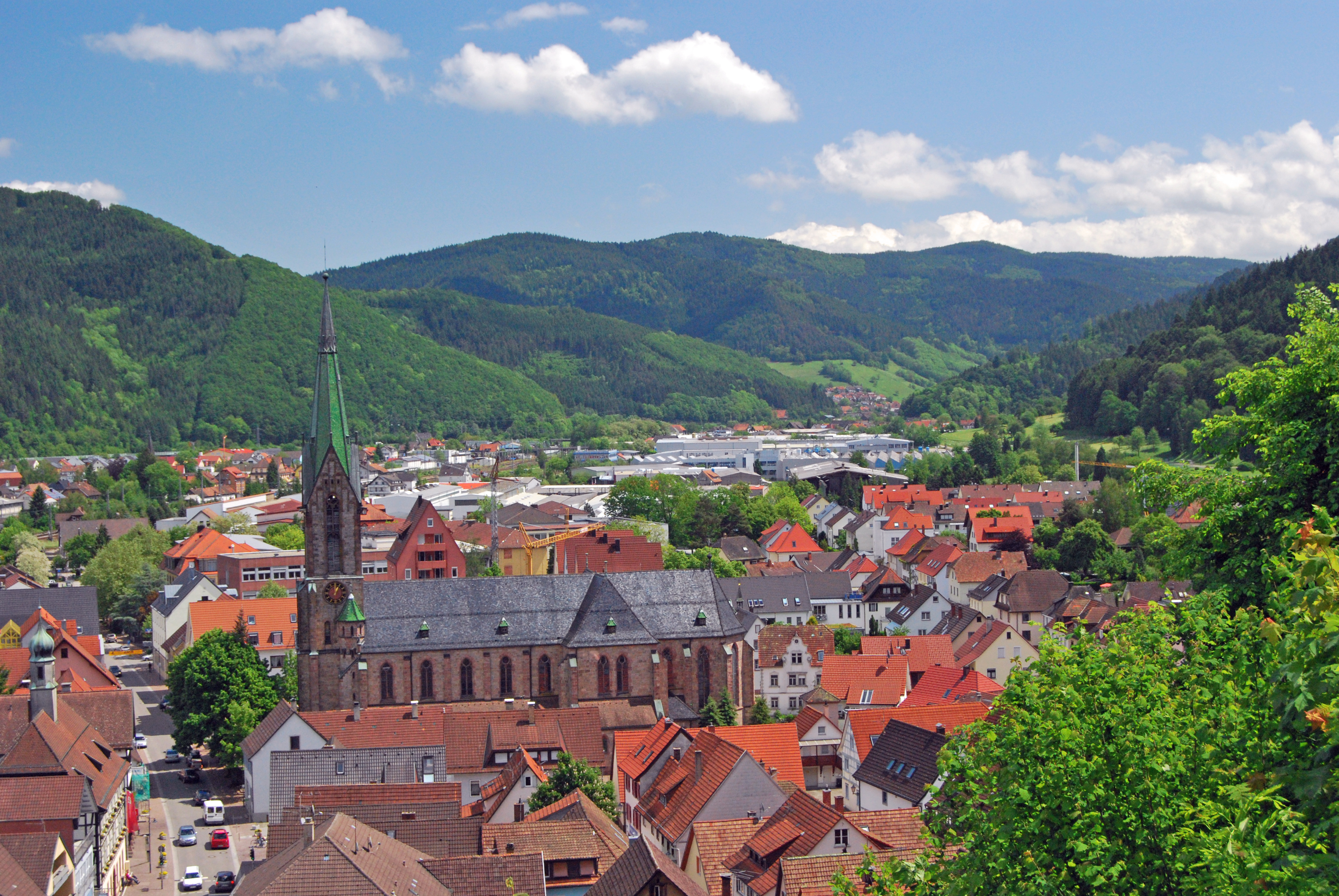
Hausach

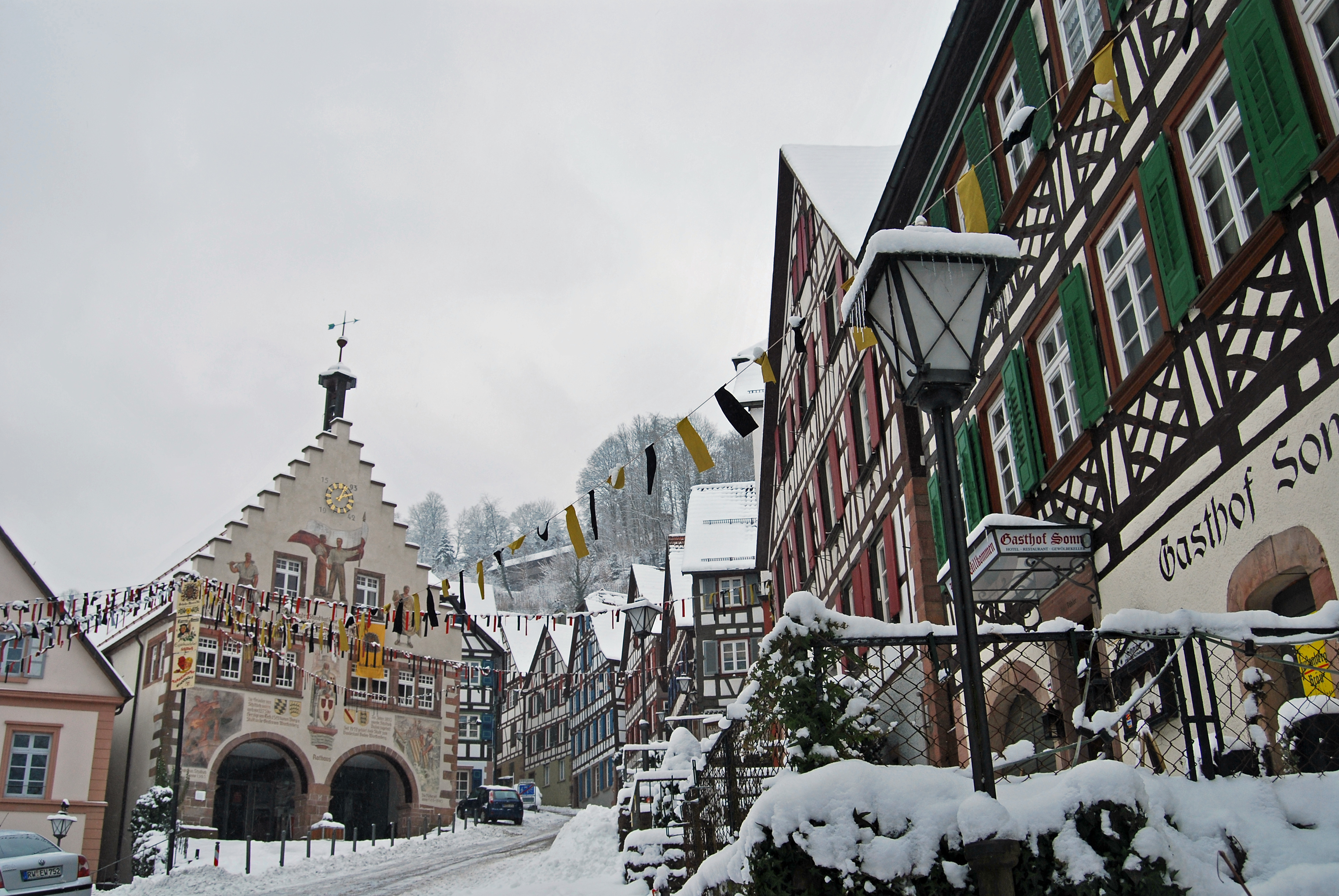
Schiltach

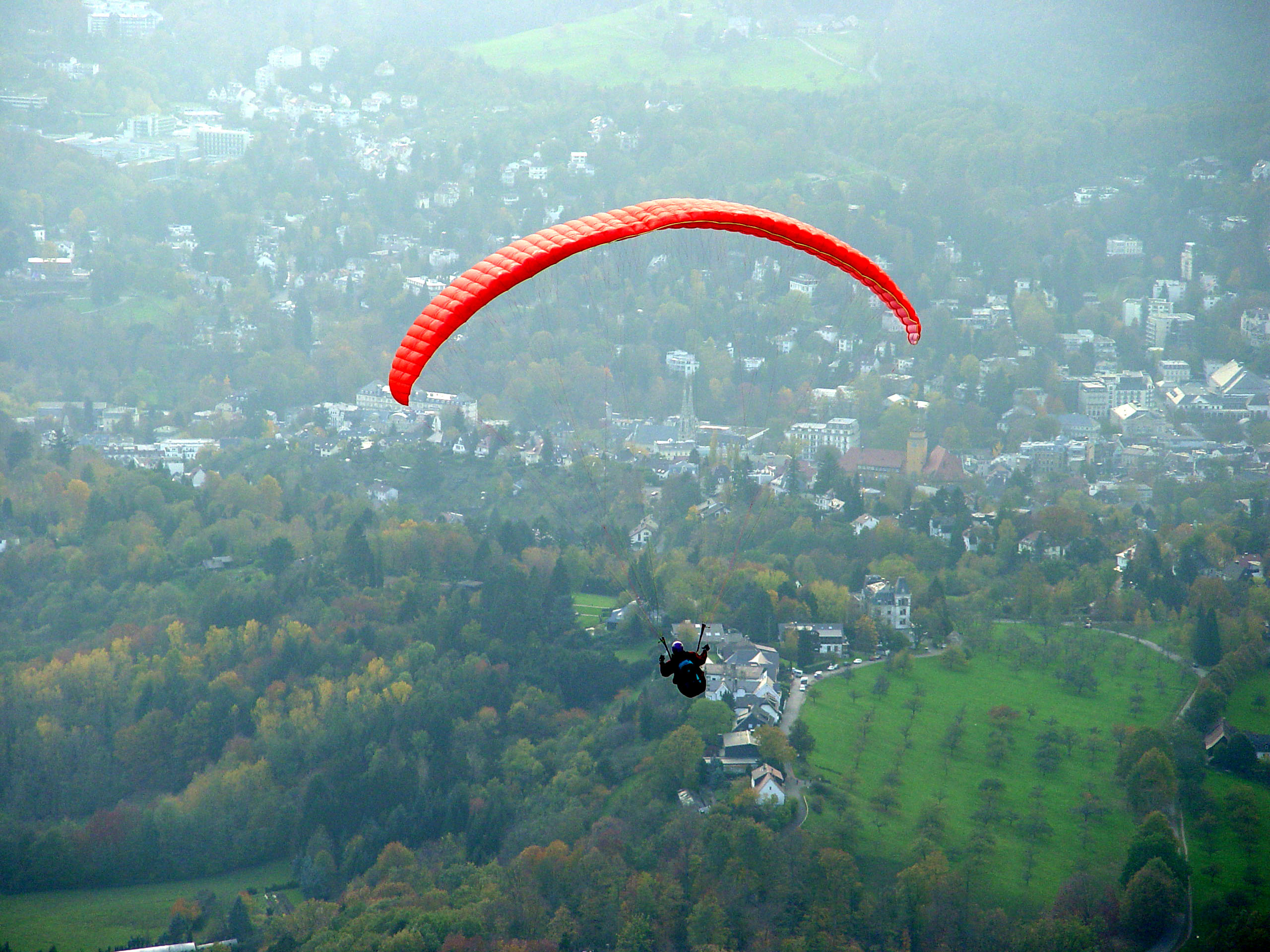
Paragliding above Baden-Baden

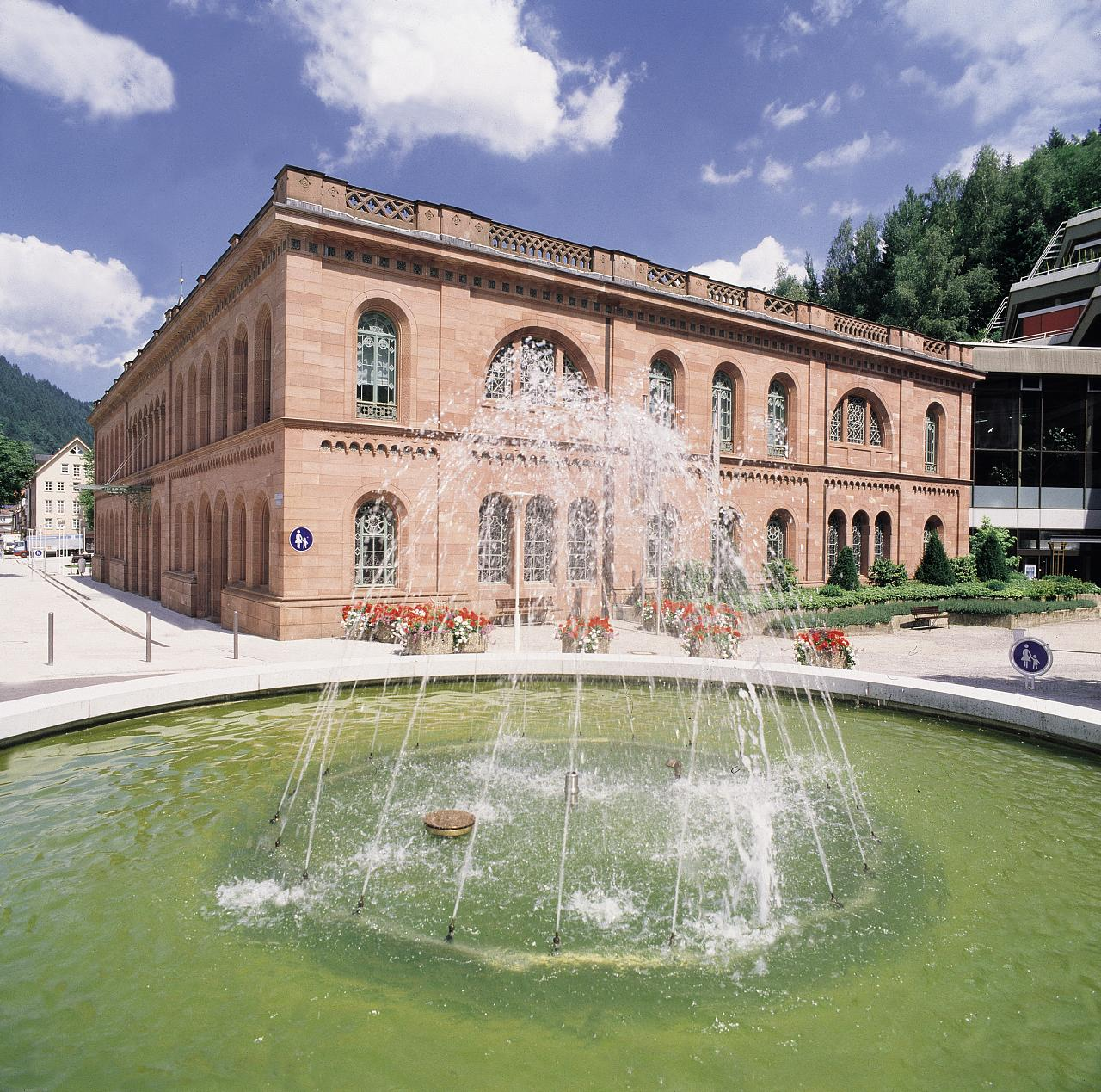
The former Graf-Eberhard-Bad (now: Palais Thermal) in Bad Wildbad

== See also ==
- Hercynian Forest (historic)
- Schwarzwaldverein (Black Forest Association)
- German Clock Museum
- Black Forest gateau
- Black Forest ham

== Bibliography ==
=== Geography ===
- Hartwig Haubrich; Wolfgang Hug; Herbert Lange (1991), Das große Buch vom Schwarzwald (in German), Stuttgart: Theiss, ISBN 3-8062-0819-0.
- Ekkehard Liehl, Wolf Dieter Sick, ed. (1989), "Der Schwarzwald. Beiträge zur Landeskunde", Veröffentlichung des Alemannischen Instituts Freiburg I. Br. (in German), vol. 47 (4. ed.), Bühl: Konkordia, ISBN 3-7826-0047-9.
- Kurt Klein (1988), "Verborgener Schwarzwald. Unbekanntes aus Volkskunde und Geschichte", Edition Morstadt (in German), vol. Bd. 18, Kehl, Strasbourg, Basel: Morstadt, ISBN 3-88571-172-9.
- Max Scheifele (2004), Aus der Waldgeschichte des Schwarzwaldes. Die Trift von Brenn- und Kohlholz. Wenn Grenzsteine reden (in German), Stuttgart: DRW-Verlag, ISBN 3-87181-010-X.
- Horst Friedrich Vorwerk (Text), Erich Spiegelhalter (Abb.) (1992), Der Schwarzwald. Eine deutsche Kulturlandschaft in Geschichte und Gegenwart (in German), Freiburg: Herder, ISBN 3-451-22658-8.

=== Economy, geology and mining ===
- Michael Bliedtner, Manfred Martin (1986), Erz- und Minerallagerstätten des Mittleren Schwarzwaldes (in German), Freiburg im Breisgau: Geologisches Landesamt Baden-Württemberg, ISBN 978-88-12-65452-9.
- Eberhard Gothein: Wirtschaftsgeschichte des Schwarzwaldes und der angrenzenden Landschaften. Erster Band: Städte- und Gewerbegeschichte, Verlag Karl J. Trübner, Strassburg 1892 (digitalised).
- Gregor Markl, Sönke Lorenz, ed. (2004), Silber, Kupfer, Kobalt. Bergbau im Schwarzwald (in German), Filderstadt: Markstein, ISBN 3-935129-10-6.
- Georg Sawatzki, Horst Peter Hann (2003), "Badenweiler-Lenzkirch-Zone (Südschwarzwald): Erläuterungen mit Hinweisen für Exkursionen", Geologische Karte von Baden-Württemberg 1:50000 (in German), Freiburg im Breisgau: Landesamt für Geologie, Rohstoffe und Bergbau Baden-Württemberg.
- Wolfgang Werner, Volker Dennert (2004), Lagerstätten und Bergbau im Schwarzwald (in German), Freiburg im Breisgau: Landesamt für Geologie, Rohstoffe und Bergbau Baden-Württemberg.

=== Art history ===
- Richard Schmidt: Schwarzwald (Deutsche Lande – Deutsche Kunst). Munich/Berlin, 1965.

=== Nature ===
- Adolf Hanle: Nordschwarzwald (Meyers Naturführer). Mannheim/Vienna/Zurich, 1989.
- Adolf Hanle: Südschwarzwald (Meyers Naturführer). Mannheim/Vienna/Zurich, 1989.
- Ulrike Klugmann (Hrsg.): Südschwarzwald, Feldberg und Wutachschlucht (Naturmagazin Draußen). Hamburg, 1983.
- Hans-Peter Schaub: Der Schwarzwald. Naturvielfalt in einer alten Kulturlandschaft. Mannheim, 2001.

=== Fiction ===
- Jürgen Lodemann (ed.): Schwarzwaldgeschichten. Klöpfer & Mayer, Tübingen, 2007, ISBN 978-3-940086-04-4.
- Herbert Schnierle-Lutz (ed.): Schwarzwald-Lesebuch. Geschichten aus 6 Jahrhunderten mit zahlreichen Bildern, 224 pages, Hohenheim Verlag, Stuttgart, 2011, ISBN 978-3-89850-213-9.

=== General ===
- Barnes, K. J. (2007). A Rough Passage: Memories of an Empire
- Bremke, N. (1999). Schwarzwald quer. Karlsruhe: Braun. ISBN 3-7650-8228-7.
- Käflein, Achim (photographs); Huber, Alexander (German text); Freund, BethAnne (English translation) (2012). Schwarzwald: Natur und Landschaft. edition-kaeflein.de. p. 228. ISBN 978-3-940788-16-0.
- Lamparski, F. (1985). Der Einfluß der Regenwurmart Lumbricus badensis auf Waldböden im Südschwarzwald. Schriftenreihe des Institut für Bodenkunde und Waldernährungslehre der Albert-Ludwigs-Universität Freiburg i. Br., 15. ISSN 0344-2691. English summary
