= Gillian White (sculptor) =

Swiss-based English sculptor (1939–2026)

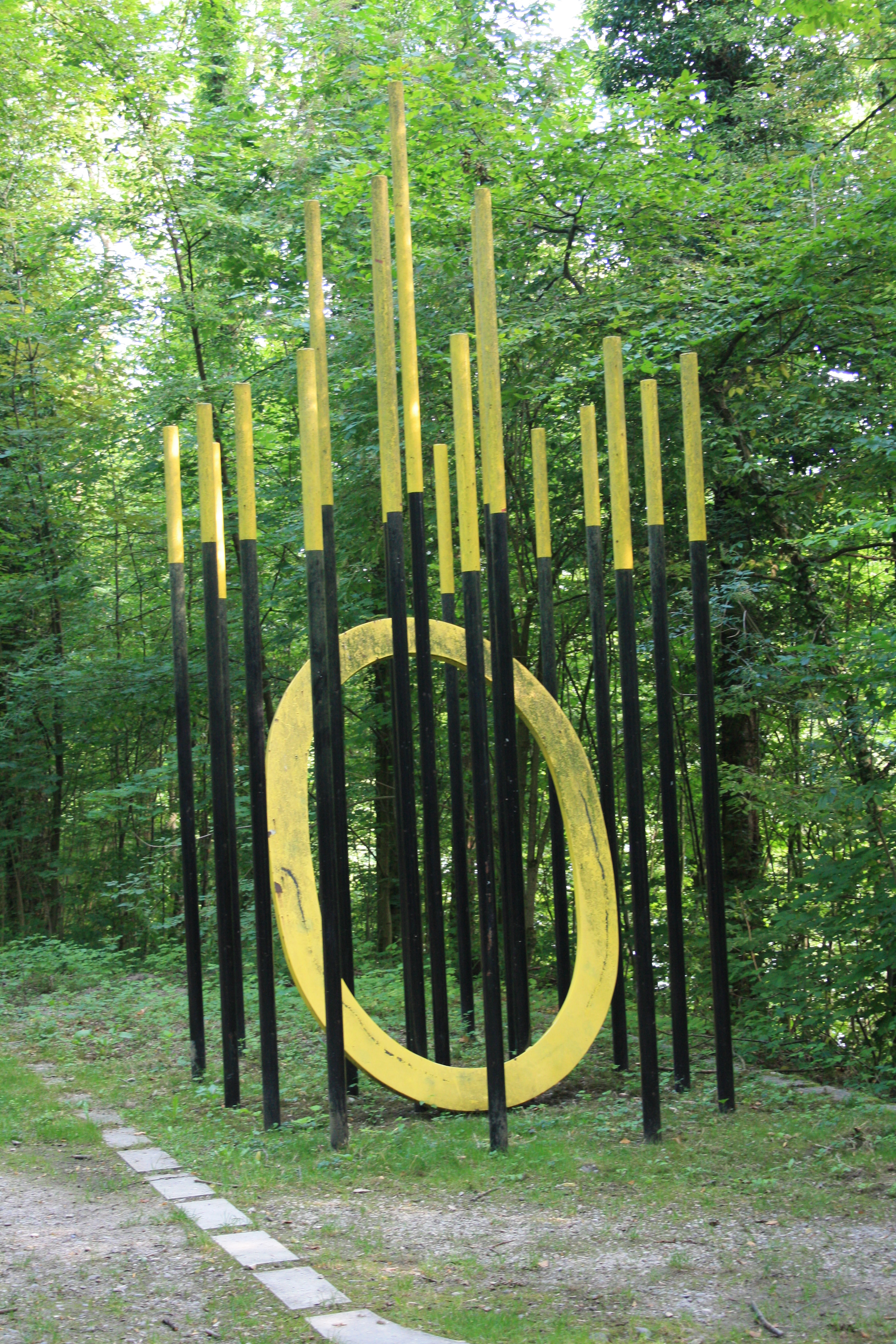
White's Lichtung (1991) on the Kulturweg Baden-Wettingen-Neuenhof, photographed in 2011

Gillian Louise White (20 June 1939 – 31 January 2026) was a British-born Swiss sculptor who lived and worked in Leibstadt, Switzerland. She was renowned for her large-scale public works and art commissions for buildings. In 1969, shortly before relocating to Switzerland, Gillian White won her first competition with her sculpture "Gewässerschutzplastik" made of polyester for a public artwork in Olten.

== Life and career ==
White was born in Orpington, Kent on 20 June 1939. She attended the Elmhurst Ballet School which was then in Camberley. White studied at Saint Martin's School of Art and the Central School of Art and Design in London, and École nationale supérieure des Beaux-Arts in Paris.

Her works on public display include Echodrome, created with her husband Albert Siegenthaler (1938-1984), is on display on the campus of the École Polytechnique Fédérale de Lausanne; Lichtung ("Lighting") on the Kulturweg Baden-Wettingen-Neuenhof; the 7 metres (23 ft) Wave White Wedded Words 2 (2002/2003), with a title inspired by James Joyce, on the Kunstpfad am Mummelsee in Seebach in the Black Forest, Germany; a work in the sculpture garden of Vullierens Castle; an untitled work (1993) in Winterthur; and works at the Villa Berberich in Bad Säckingen. In 2009 the Kunstmuseum Olten held a retrospective exhibition of her work.

From 1972 onwards, she lived and worked in Leibstadt, Canton of Aargau, Switzerland. White died in Döttingen, Aargau on 31 January 2026, at the age of 86.

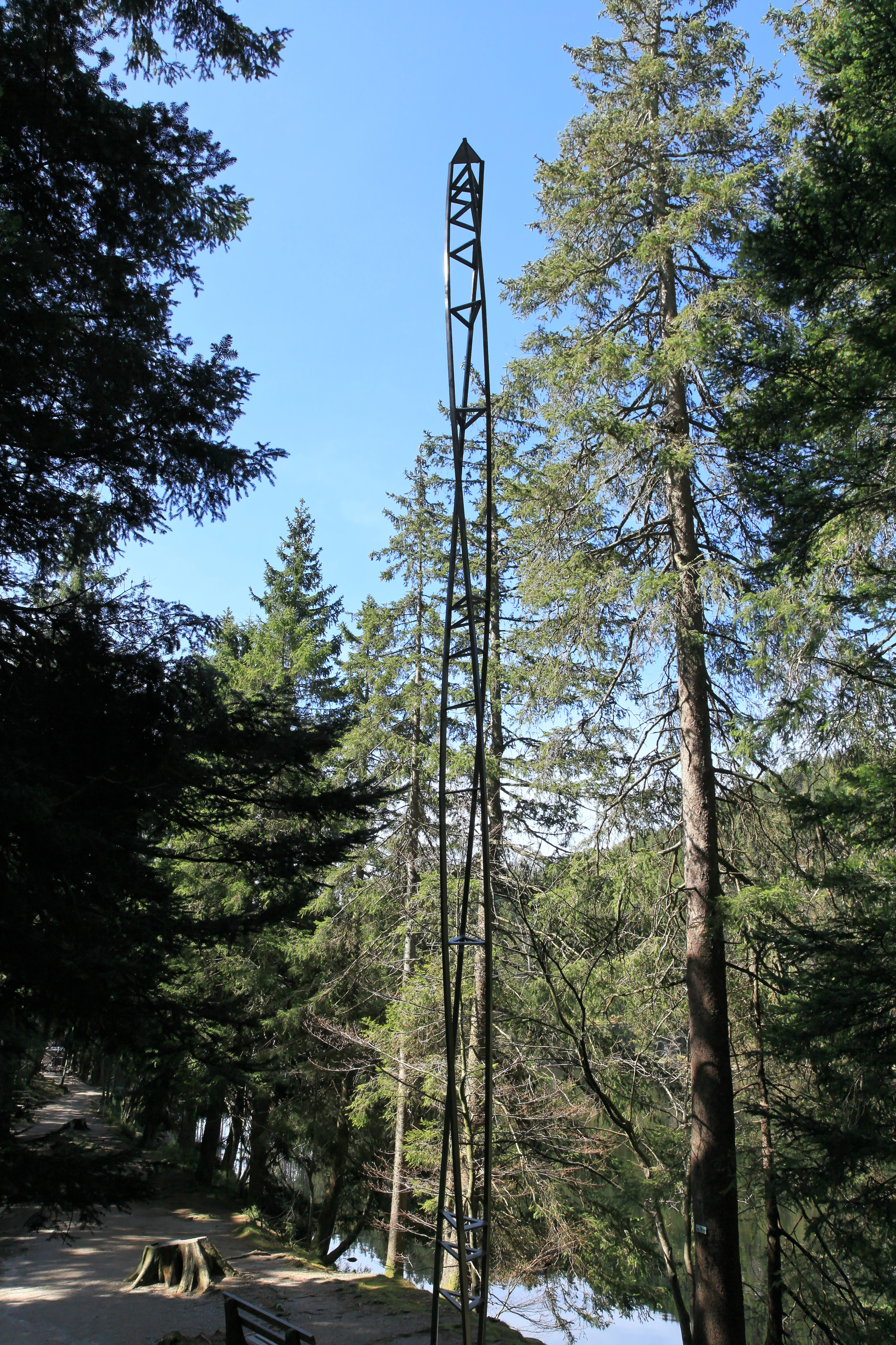
Wave White Wedded Words 2

== Selected publications ==
- White, Gillian (2009). Tanz in Eisen : Werke aus 40 Jahren = Dance in steel : 40 years' work. Scheidegger & Spiess. ISBN 978-3-85881-251-3.
