= Kunstpfad am Mummelsee =

Sculpture path in Germany

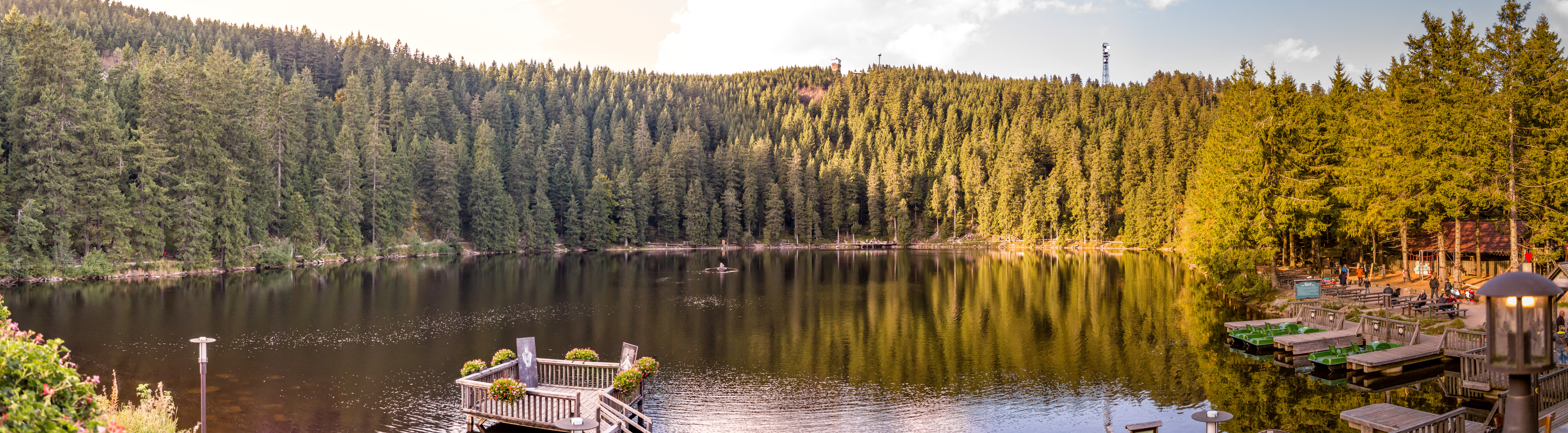
The Mummelsee at which the sculpture walk is situated

The Kunstpfad am Mummelsee (literally: "Art Trail at the Mummelsee") is a sculpture path around the Mummelsee, which is located in the municipality of Seebach near Achern in the northern Black Forest in Baden-Württemberg (Germany). The sculpture path is 0,8 kilometres long is primarily used for nature and art walks.

== History ==
In 1999, artists from Germany, France and Switzerland designed an art path at the shore of the Mummelsee. Its themes are the symbiosis of nature and art as well as the myths of the Mummelsee. From 1999 to 2004, Martina Sauer was the executive cultural officer of the project.

== Collection ==
The collection of the Kunstpfad features the following installations:

- Roger Aupperle: Ausflug an den Mummelsee (2001/10)
- Rolf Bodenseh: 7 Würfel (2000)
- Stefan Bombasi: Fester Grund (2000)
- Josef Bücheler: Waldengel – Kunst am Baum (1999)
- Sandra Eades: Spiegelnde Tore (2000)
- Armin Göhringer: Kreuzschichtung (1999)
- Albert Huber: Hängende Steine (2003)
- Reinhard Klessinger: Auf dem Weg zum Horizont (1999)
- Margaret Penelope Praed Mackworth: Hochmoorbläuling (2001)
- Karl Manfred Rennertz: Wer ist wie Gott? Flügel des Erzengel Michael (2002/03)
- Gert Riel: ohne Titel (1999)
- Robert Schad: enFIM (2001)
- Alf Setzer: ohne Titel (1999)
- Reinhard Sigle: Grün in Grün (2000)
- Reinhard Sigle: Amors Pfeile (2010)
- Gabi Streile: arboris aspectus (2001)
- Ilse Teipelke: Der Tiger des Herrn von Grimmelshausen (2000)
- Gillian White: Wave White Wedded Words 2 (2002/03)

== Trails ==
- Seibelseckle circular trail (4:30 h, 15,5 km): Seibelseckle – Ochsenstall – Hans-Reymann-Weg – Kunstpfad am Mummelsee – Berghotel Mummelsee – Seibelseckle
- Seebach mountain tour (3:30 h, 13,3 km): Silbergründle (old mining area) – Elsaweg (NATO pumping station) – Hohfelsen – Kunstpfad am Mummelsee – Seibelseckle – am Seebächle (along the little brook) – Mummelseehalle

== Photo gallery ==
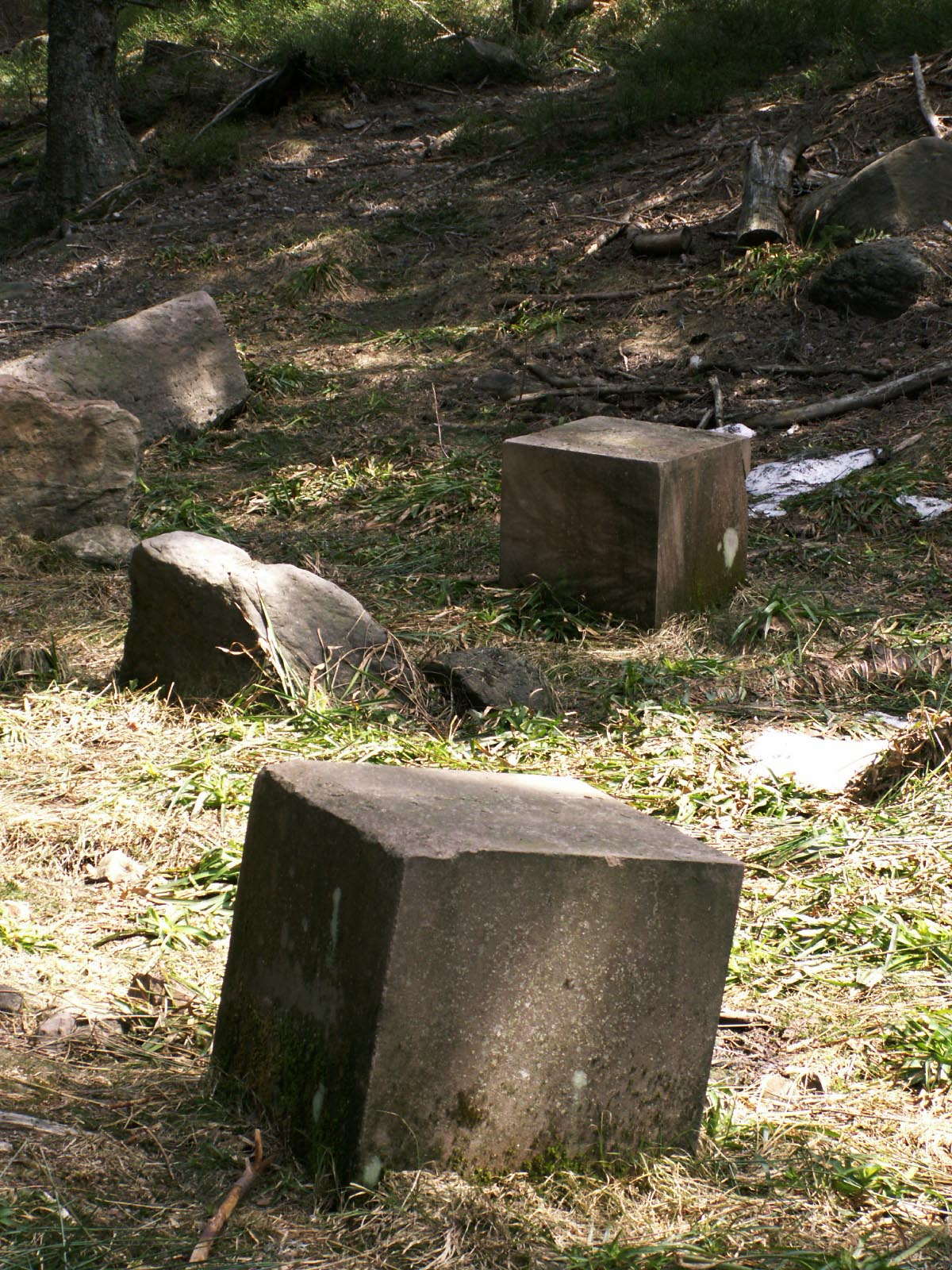
No. 2: 7 Würfel (2000) – "7 Cubes"

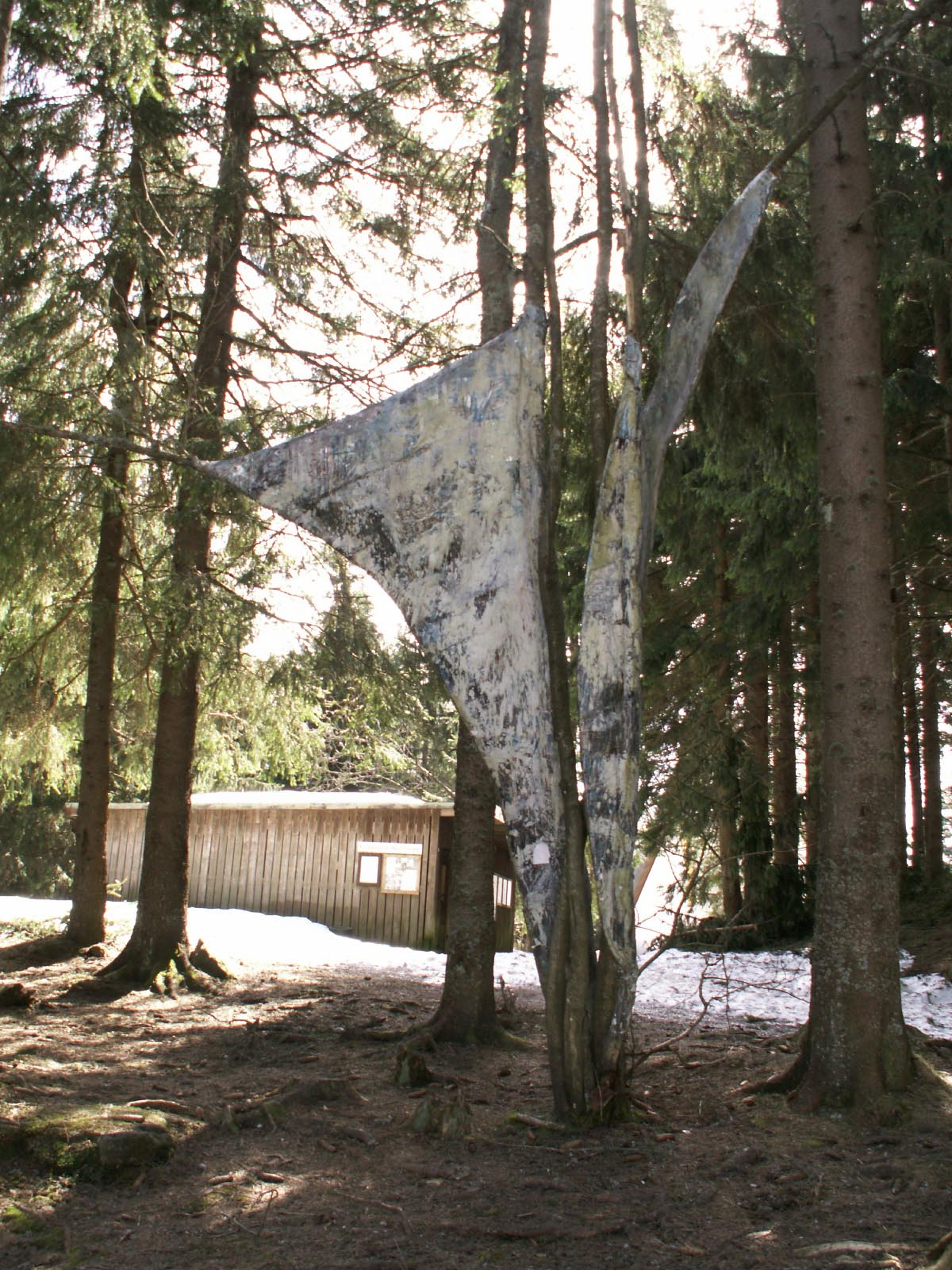
No. 4: Waldengel (1999) – "Forest Angel"

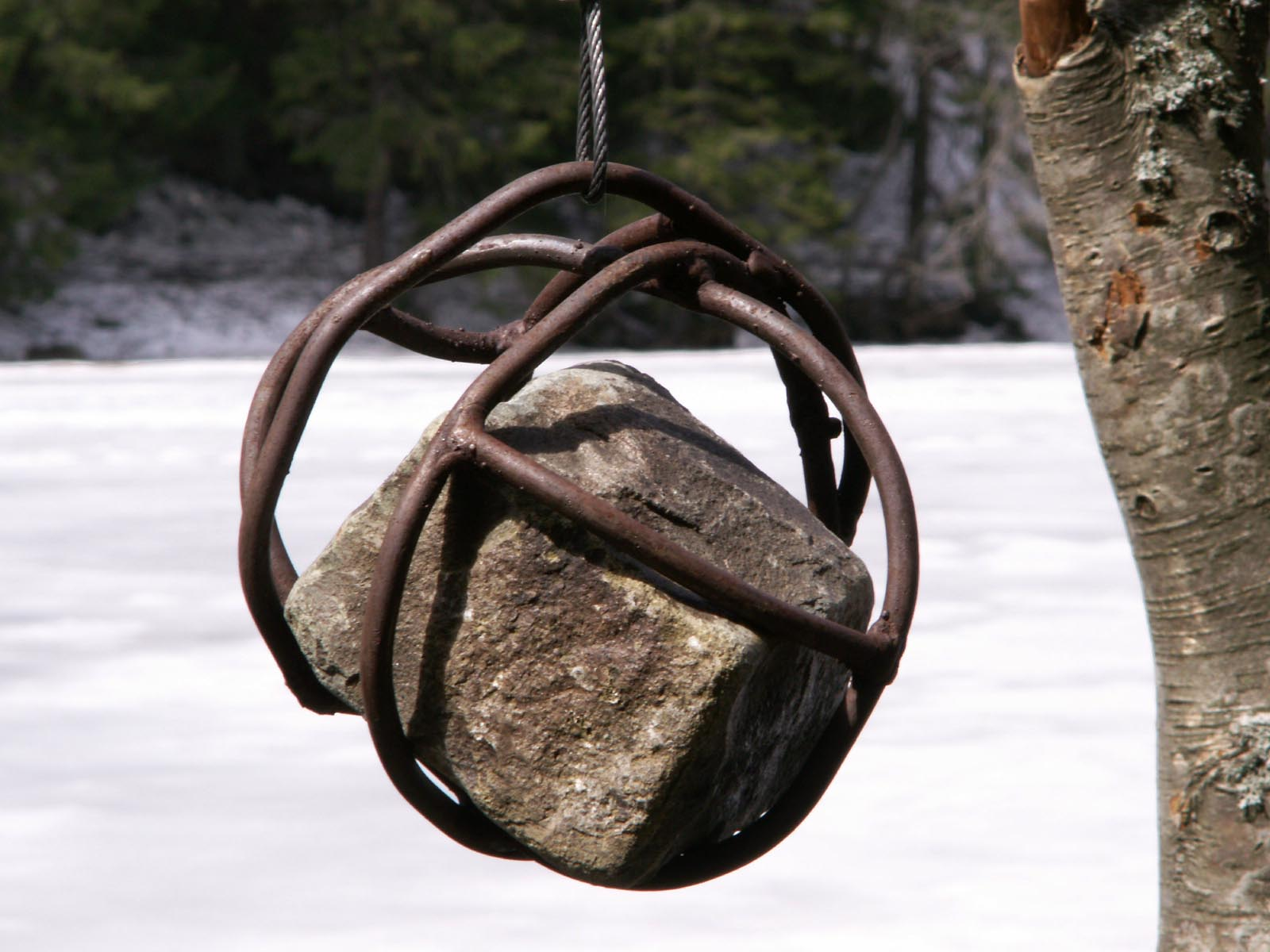
No. 7: Hängende Steine (2003) – "Hanging Stones"

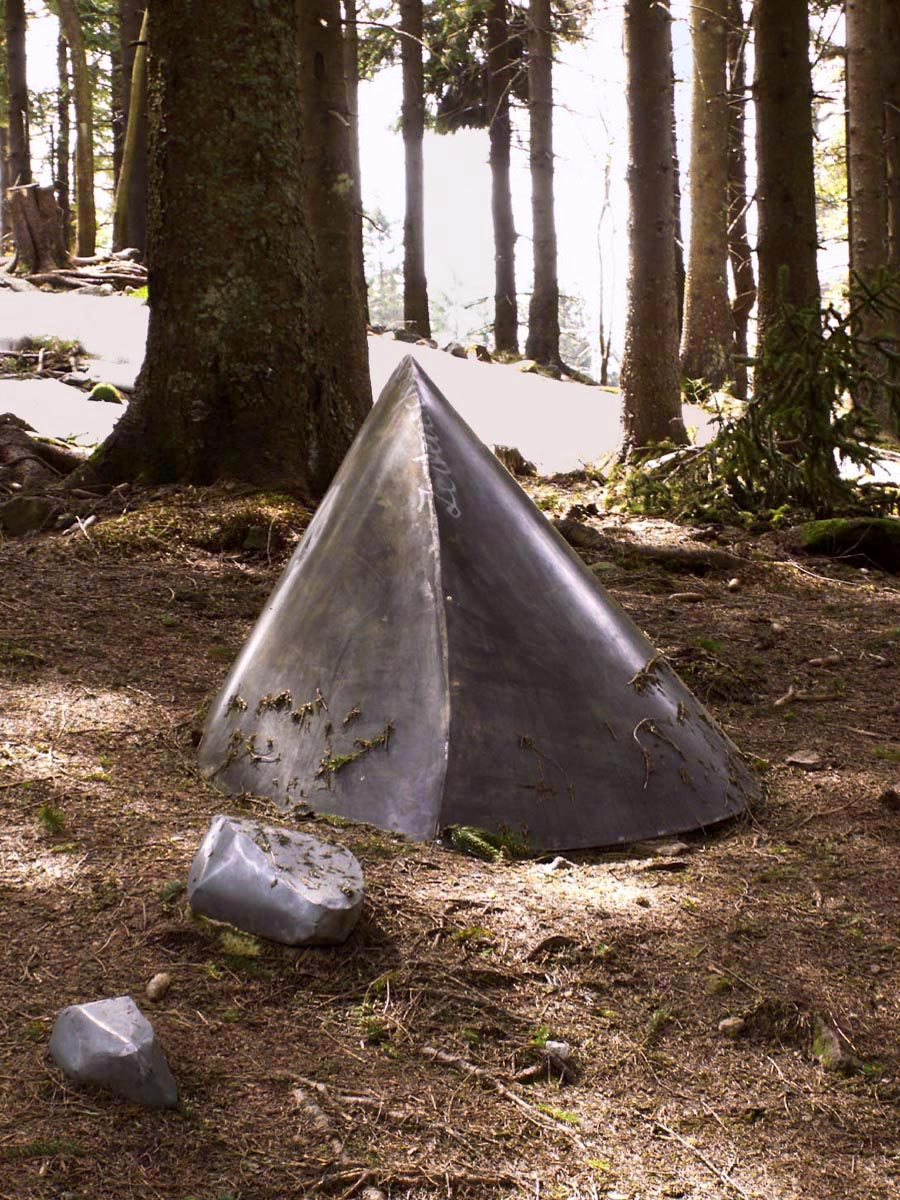
No. 8: Auf dem Weg zum Horizont (1999) – "On the way to the horizon"

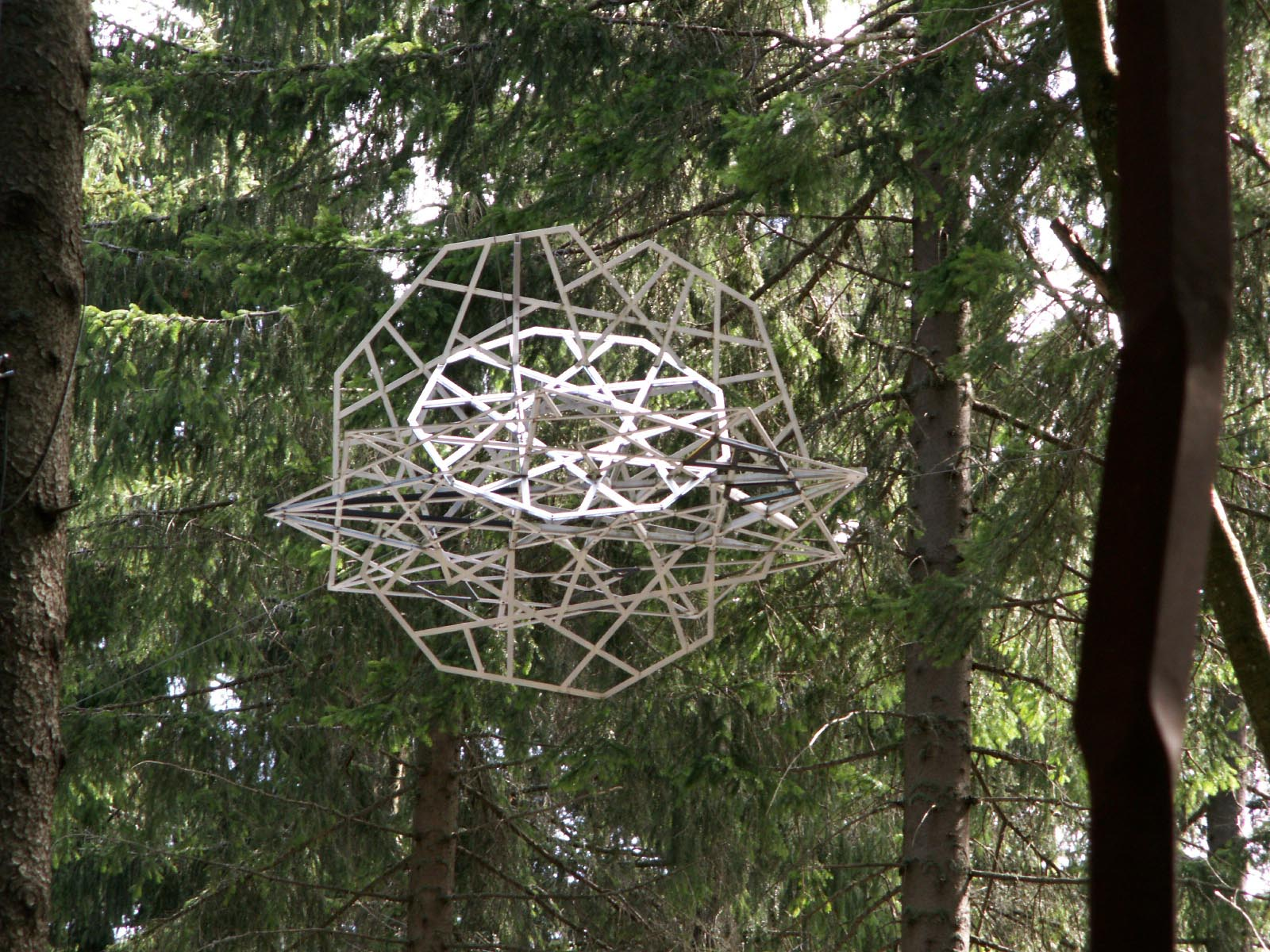
No. 9: Hochmoorbläuling (2001) – "High Moor Blue"

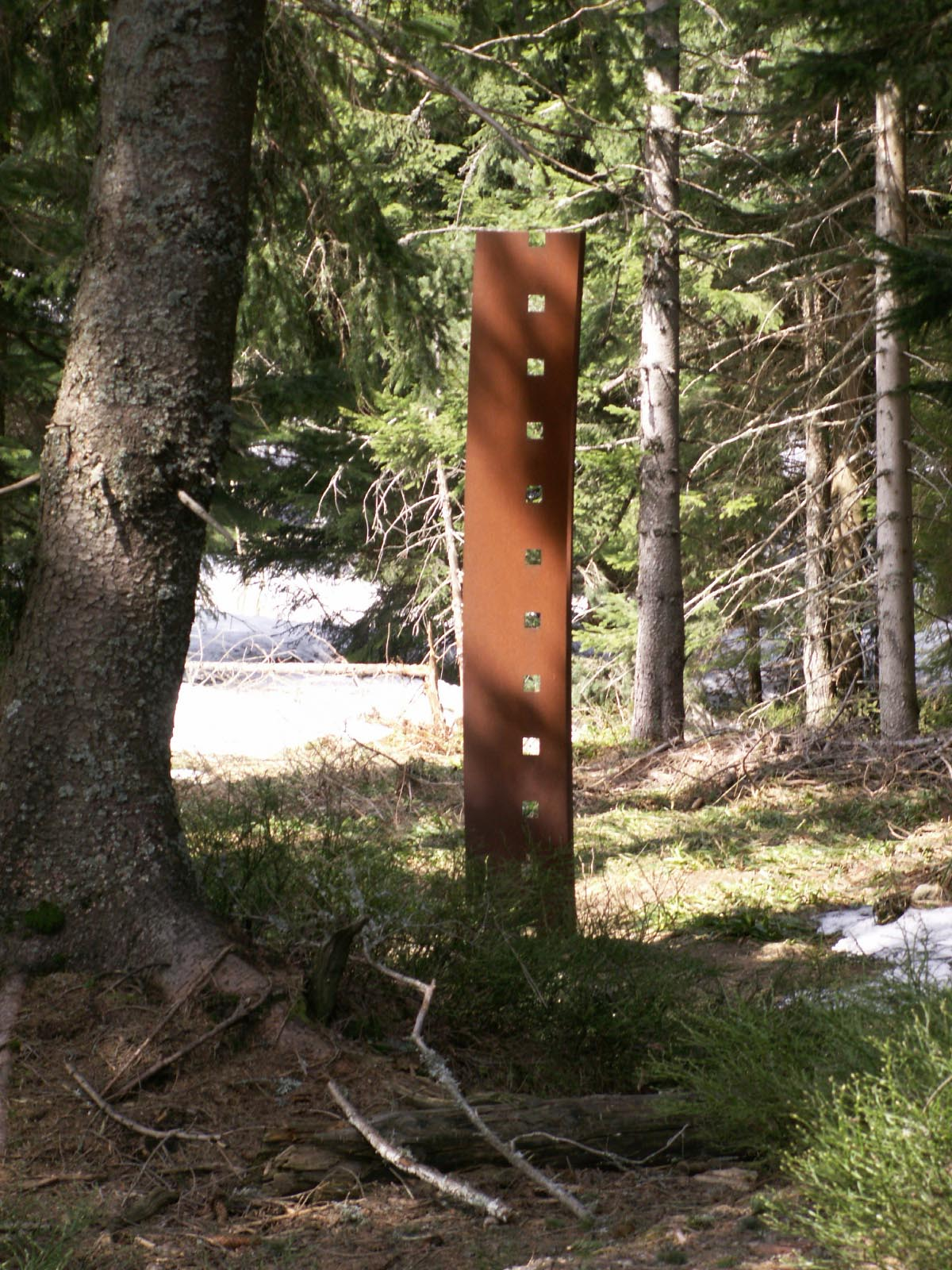
No. 11: Ohne Titel (1999) – Untitled

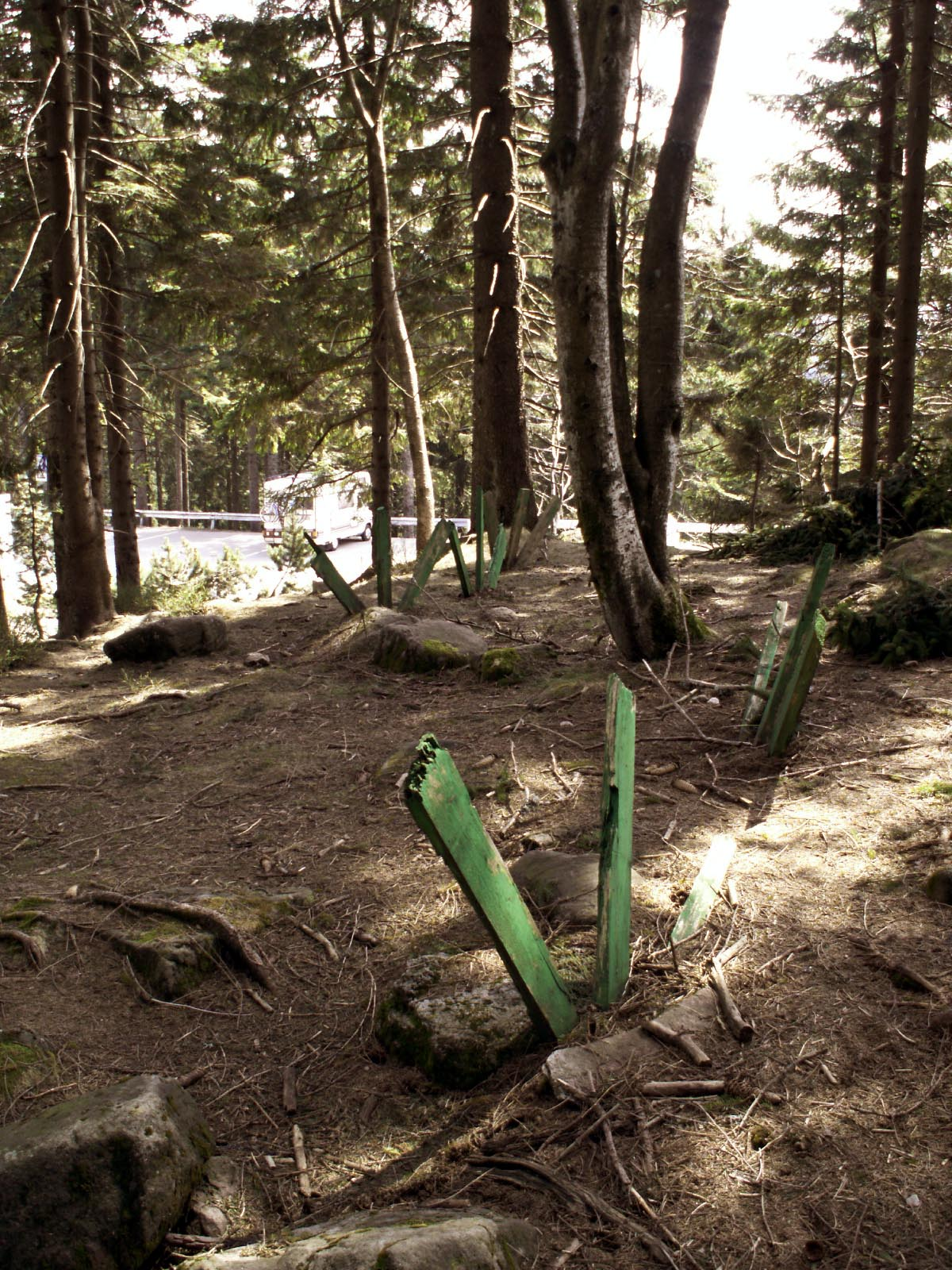
No. 14: Grün in Grün (2000) – "Green in Green"

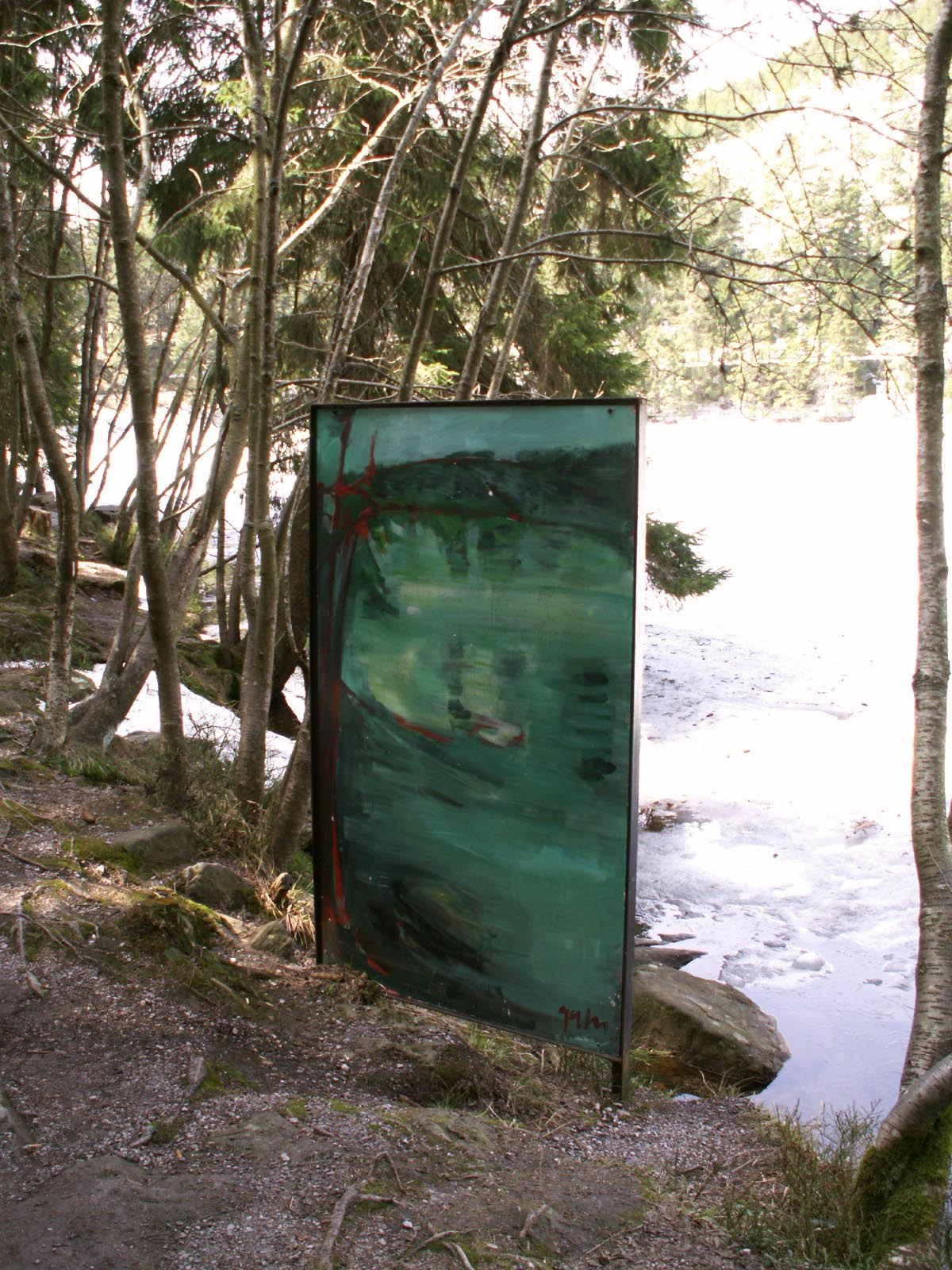
No. 16: Arboris Aspectus (2001)

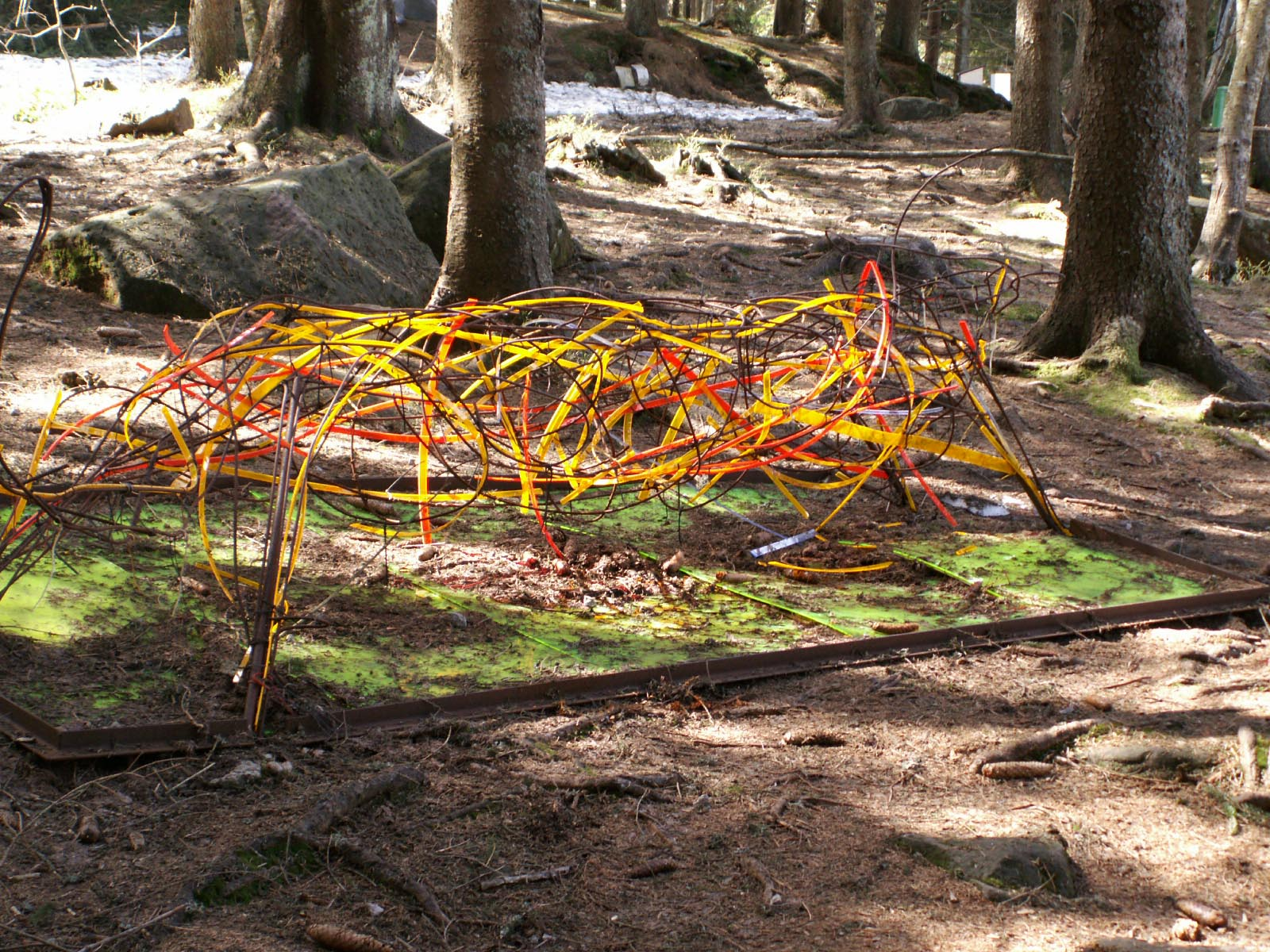
No. 17: Der Tiger des Herrn von Grimmelshausen (2000) – "The Tiger of Grimmelshausen's Lord"

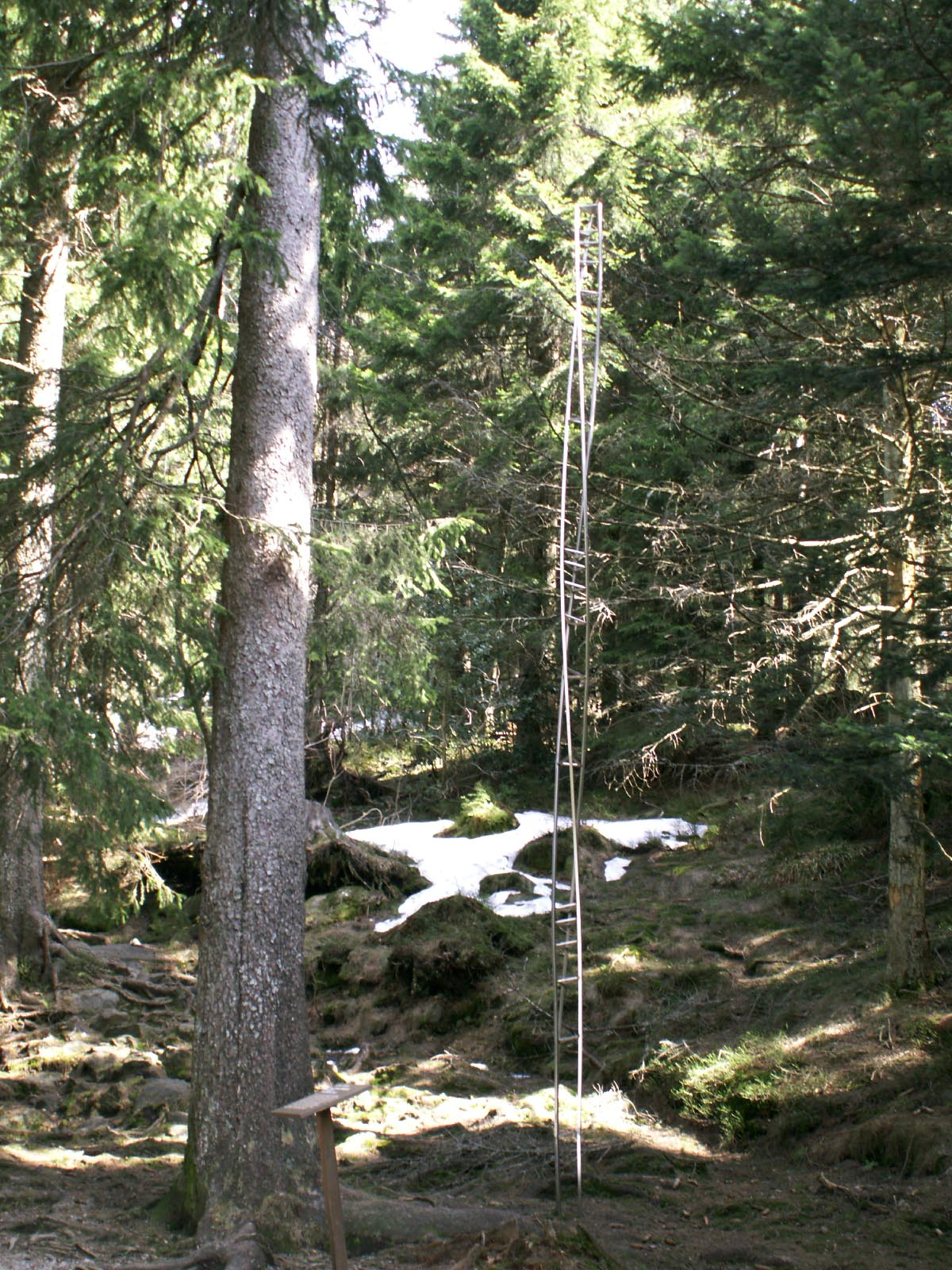
No. 18: Wave White Wedded Words (2002/03)
