= Mummelsee =

Small lake in the Black Forest, Germany

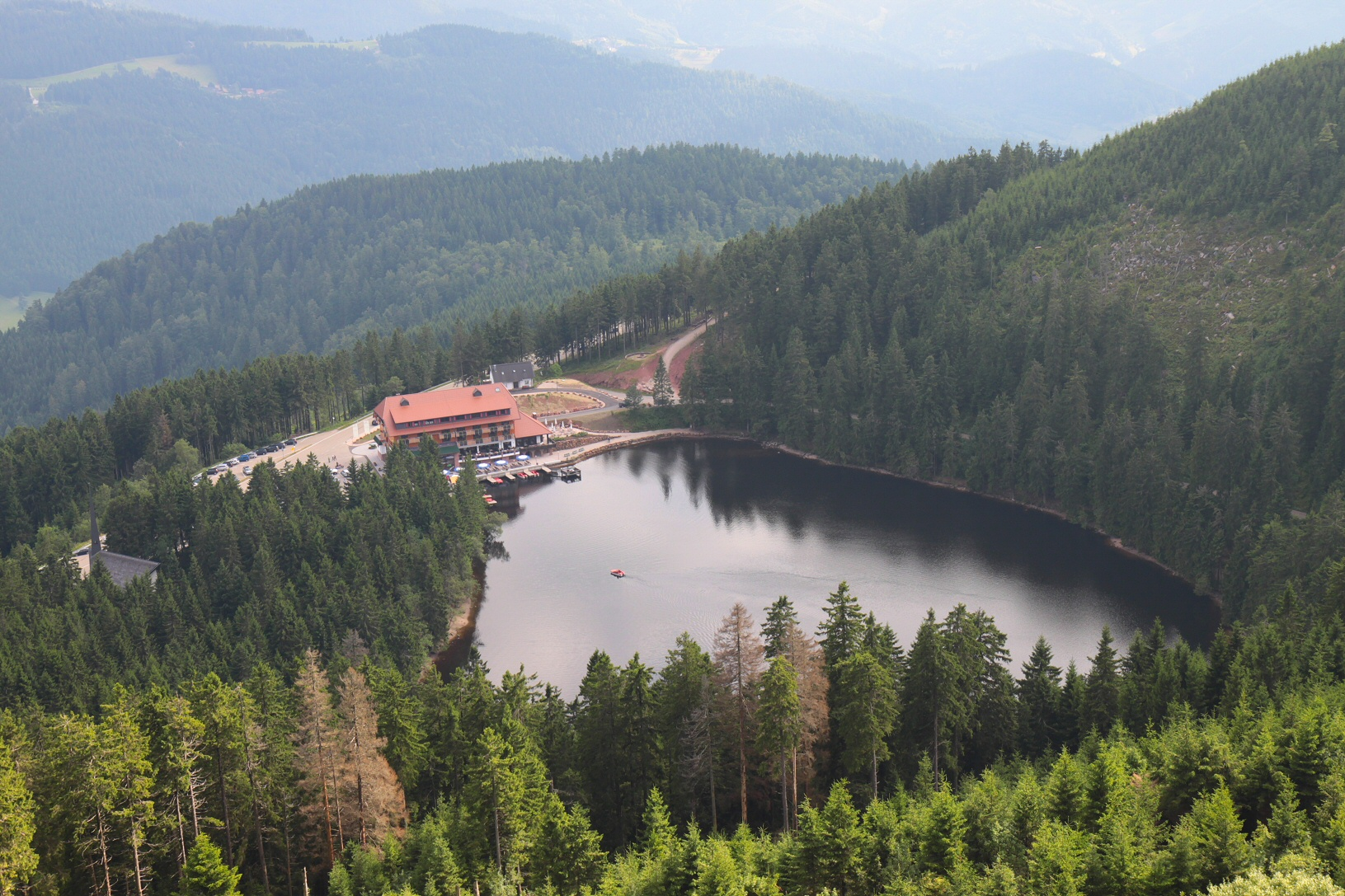

- Location within Baden-Württemberg
- Location: Black Forest
- Coordinates: 48°35′53″N 8°12′3″E
- Basin countries: Germany
- Max. depth: 17 metres (56 ft)
- Surface elevation: 1,036 metres (3,399 ft)

The Mummelsee is a 17-metre-deep lake at the western mountainside of the Hornisgrinde in the Northern Black Forest of Germany. It is very popular with tourists travelling along the Black Forest High Road. According to legends, the lake is inhabited by a Nix and the King of the Mummelsee.

With a circumference of 800 meters, the Mummelsee is the largest of the seven cirque lakes in the Black Forest, the deepest at 17 m deep and the highest at 1036 m.

== Geography ==
The Mummelsee has a circumference of approximately 800 m (2,625 ft) and is surrounded by steep and forested mountain slopes on its northern, western, and eastern sides. The western lakeside rises towards the mountain "Katzenkopf" (1,123 m (3,684 ft) above sea level), and the northern lakeshore rises towards Hornisgrinde. At 1,163 m (3,816 ft) above sea level, Hornisgrinde is the highest mountain in the Northern Black Forest. The southern lake banks are (nearly) flat. This is also where the alpine hotel "Mummelsee" and the nearby St. Michaels chapel are located.

== Etymology ==
According to statements made by the town Seebach, the name of the Mummelsee derives from the (German) vernacular term "Mummeln" used for white waterlilies (Nymphaea alba). In the past, this species of plant could be found in large numbers in that area. The yellow pond lily, Nuphar lutea, is also called "Mummel." The myth of the nix, which were called "Mümmlein" (diminutive form of "Mummel"), possibly could have been the namesake of the lake as well.

Connected to this context, the white waterlily is also referred to as "Nixblume" meaning "nix flower".

== Tourism ==
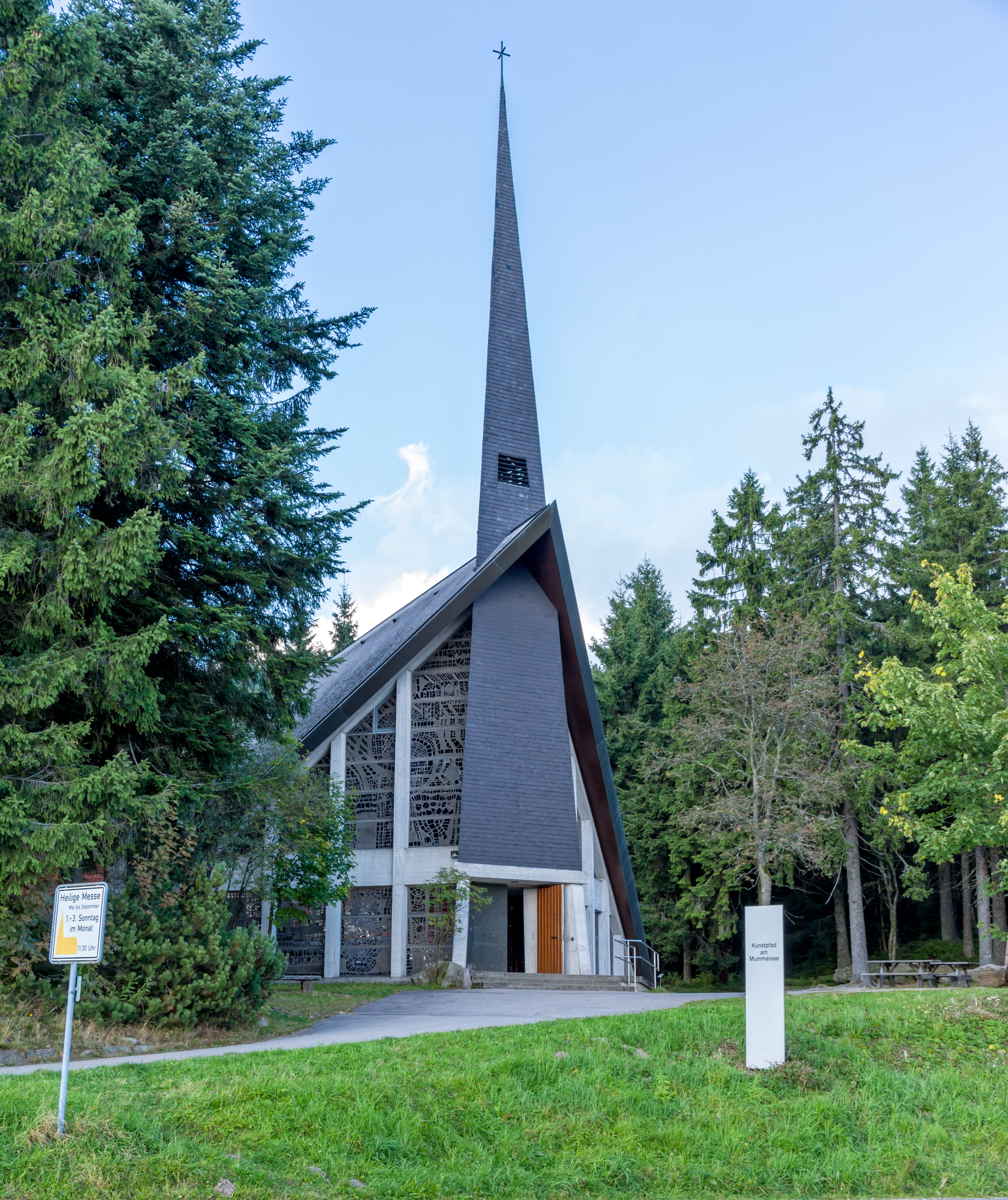
The Chapel of St Michael at the Mummelsee

Favoured by the route of the Schwarzwaldhochstraße, the lake became a tourist destination. A bigger building that includes the hotel, two restaurants, one grocery and souvenir store, as well as a paddleboat rental is located directly near the visitors' car park.

A great part of the hotel building burnt down on 5 May 2008. The fire was presumably a case of arson. After the incident, the hotel was rebuilt in the "Schwarzwaldstil" with an increase of usable floor space from 2,385 m^{2} (25,672 ft^{2}) to 3,690 m^{2} (39,719 ft^{2}) and reopened on 26 March 2010.

The Chapel of St Michael was inaugurated in 1937. It was dedicated to the Archangel Michael, an impressive reminder at a time when the National Socialists were gaining more power. From the outside, the low roof of the chapel is striking. It is modeled on a Black Forest house. The slim tower stylises a Black Forest fir.

=== Trails ===
Formerly, the naturally existing trail around the lake was kept in its original state with several tight passages and obstructive tree roots.

In 1999, the Kunstpfad am Mummelsee, a sculpture path by international artists was installed along the circular trail. It presents 18 installations of artists visualising the connection of nature, landscape, and art.

In 2014, the path was reconstructed barrier-free.

The long-distance hiking trail with the red diamond (Westweg from Pforzheim to Basel) passes here as well as the other regional routes (blue and yellow diamond) and circular hiking trails. It is only a short trip up to the Hornisgrinde (1.5 km and 120 meters in altitude).

Other trails are:

- the Mummelsee-Hornisgrindepfad (circular walk, length: 3.9 km, suitable for dogs), and
- the Hochmoorsee-Mummelsee (circular walk, length: 5.6 km): Seibelseckle – Hochmoorweg – Bismarckturm – Hornisgrinde – Chapel St Michael at Mummelsee.

=== Transportation ===
Visitors' parking spaces are located at the southern lake shore. Busses for hiking tourists drive to Baden-Baden, Achern, and Freudenstadt on a daily basis. On weekends, there are direct bus connections available to Oppenau and once on Saturday and Sunday each to Offenburg. The "Baden-Württemberg-Ticket", "Schönes-Wochenende-Ticket" and the "Konus-Ticket" (sold by the Deutsche Bahn and local bus companies) are valid to use on all these routes.

== The Mummelsee in literature ==
- Once located in complete isolation and lacking any road connections, the lake is surrounded by quite a number of myths. According to one legend, a nix lived in the lake and bestowed people with her guidance, danced, sang, and played with them at night.
- These legends inspired Eduard Mörike to write the poem Die Geister am Mummelsee.
- In his work of adventure fiction Simplicissmus, Grimmelhausen used the lake and its inhabitants to tell about the dive to the centre of the earth. The description of the system of underwater pathways from the surface towards the centre of the earth might have been inspired by Plato's dialogues (Phaedo).
- August Schnezler, editor and collector of legends, wrote three poems (Der Mummelsee, Die Lilien, and Mummelsees Rache) about mythical incidents at the lake.

== See also ==
- August Schnezler's Mummelsee poems (in German)

== Photo gallery ==
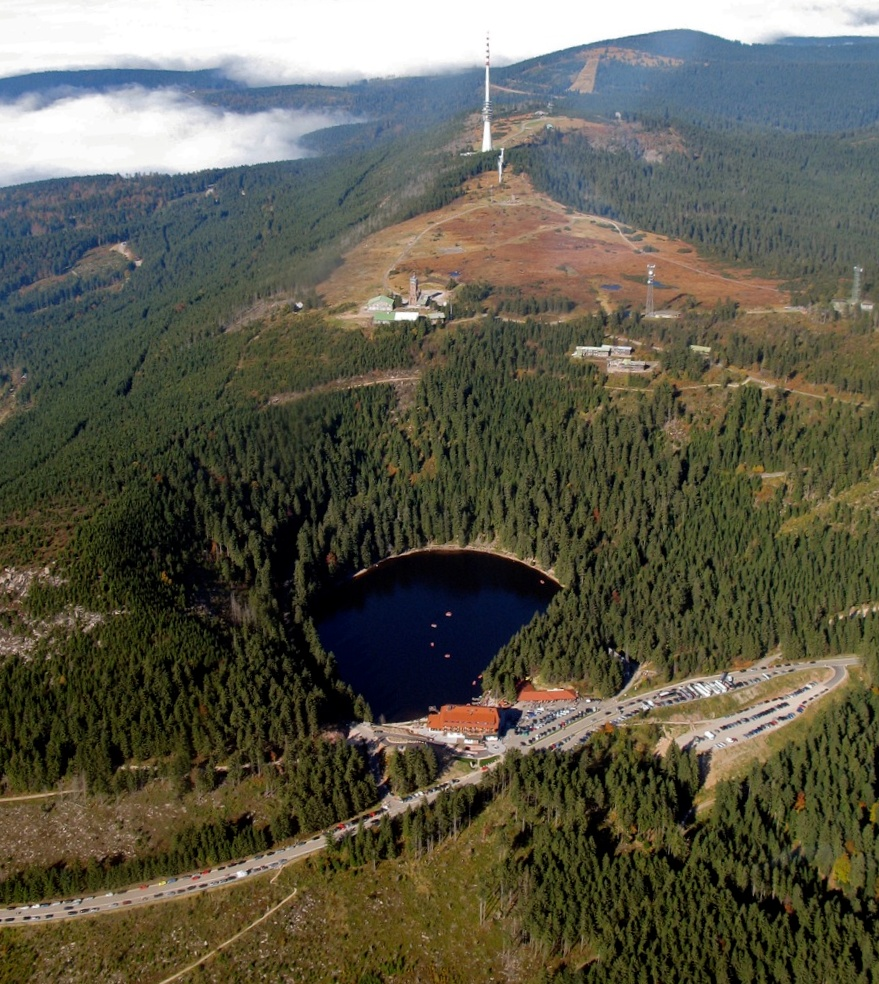
Aerial view of Mummelsee with Hornisgrindesattel (October 2010)

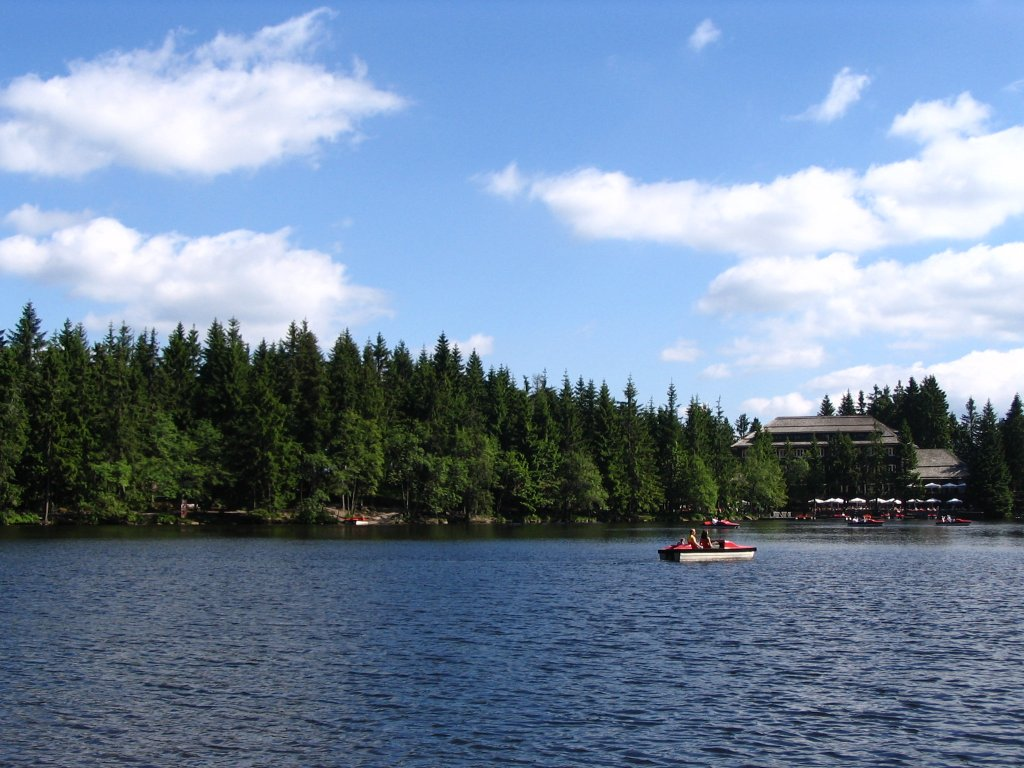
Mummelsee

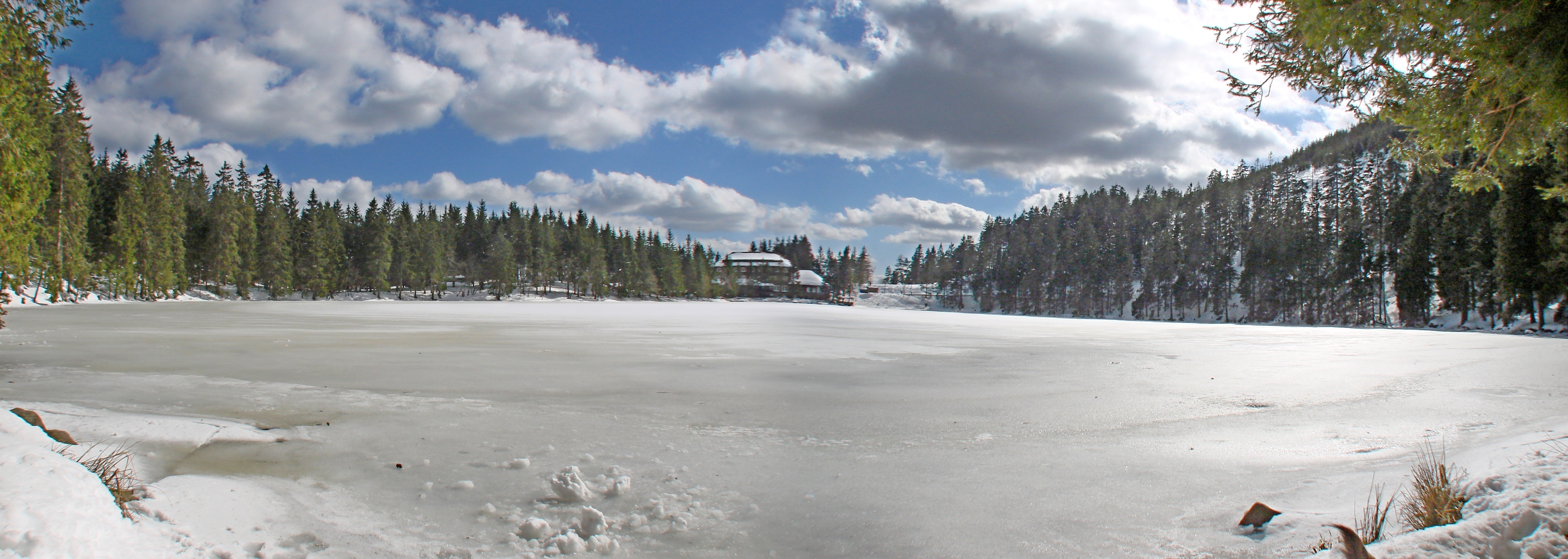
Mummelsee in the wintertime

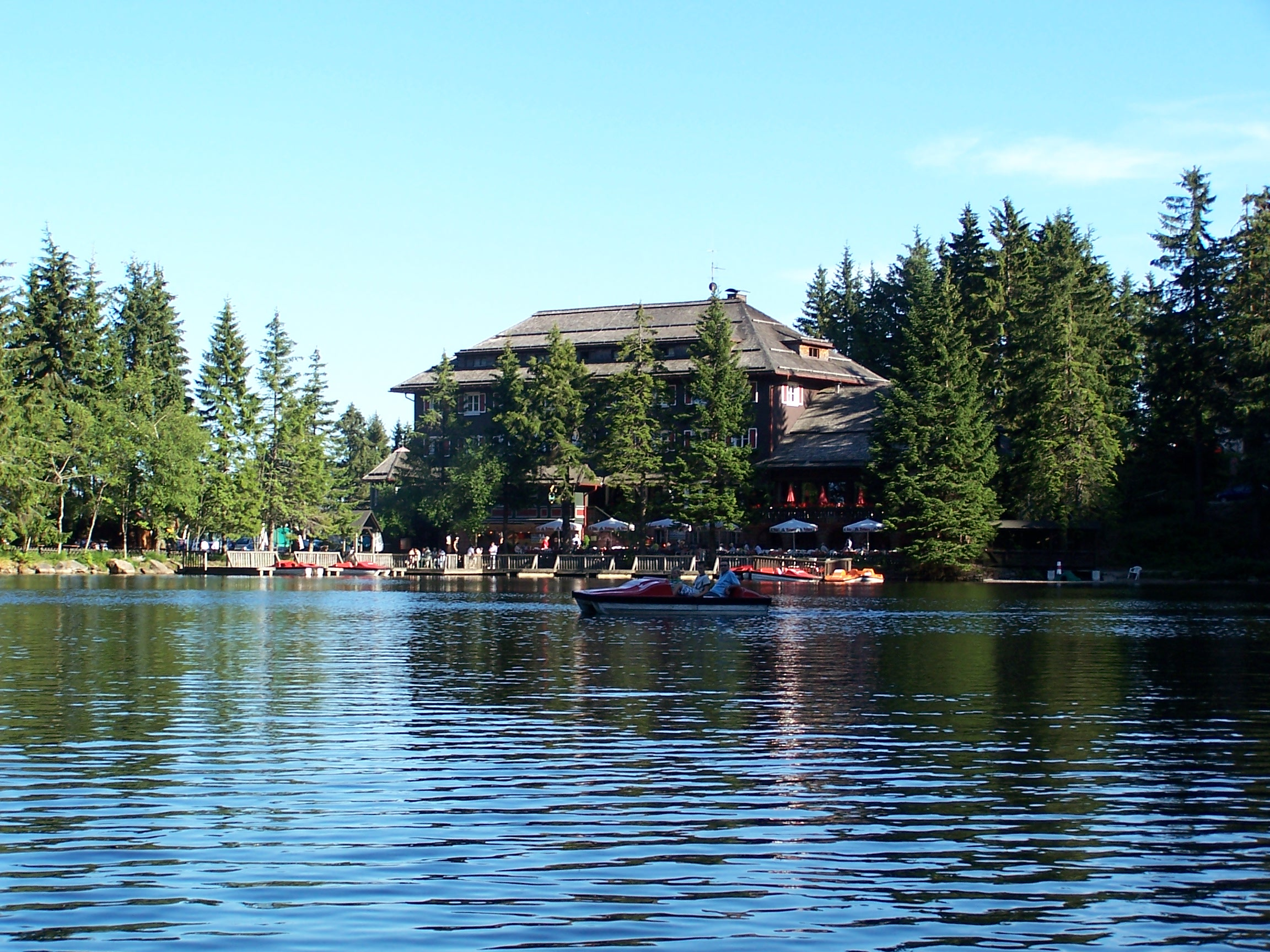
The old hotel on the lake (before the fire)

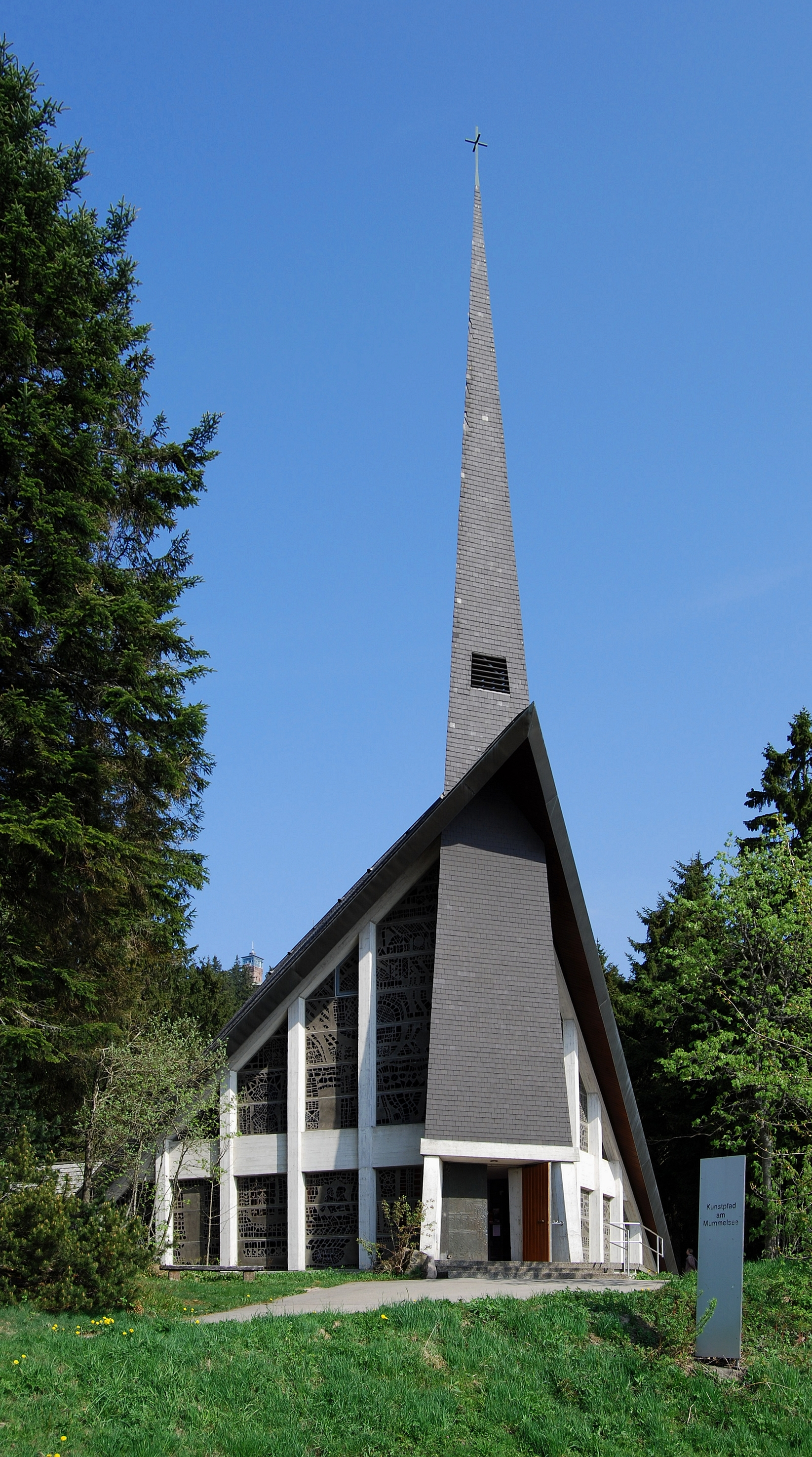
Chapel St Michael

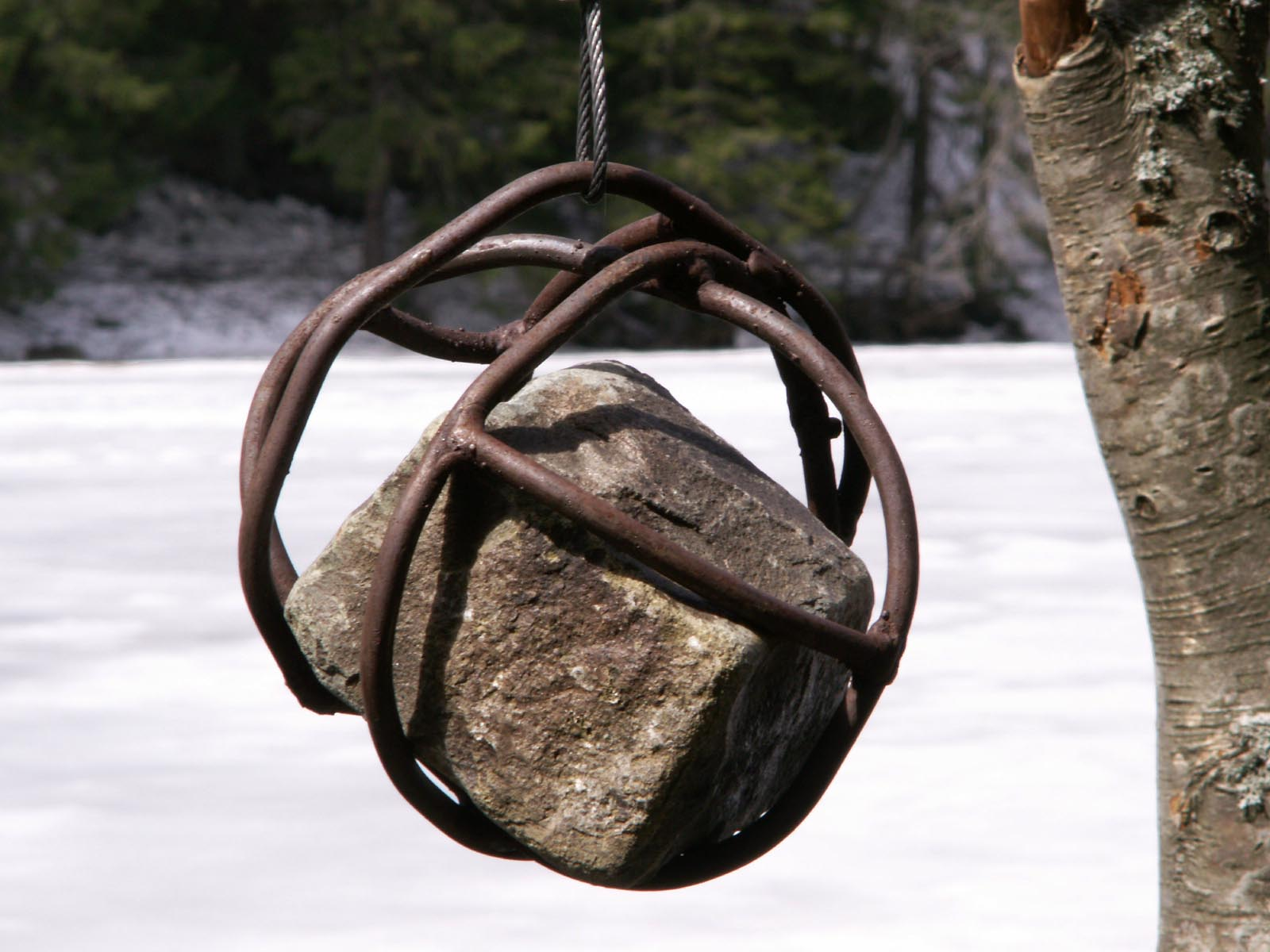
The art installation "Hanging Stones" at the Kunstpfad am Mummelsee
