= Vullierens Castle =

Castle in Vullierens, Switzerland

- Château de Vullierens
- Vullierens in Switzerland
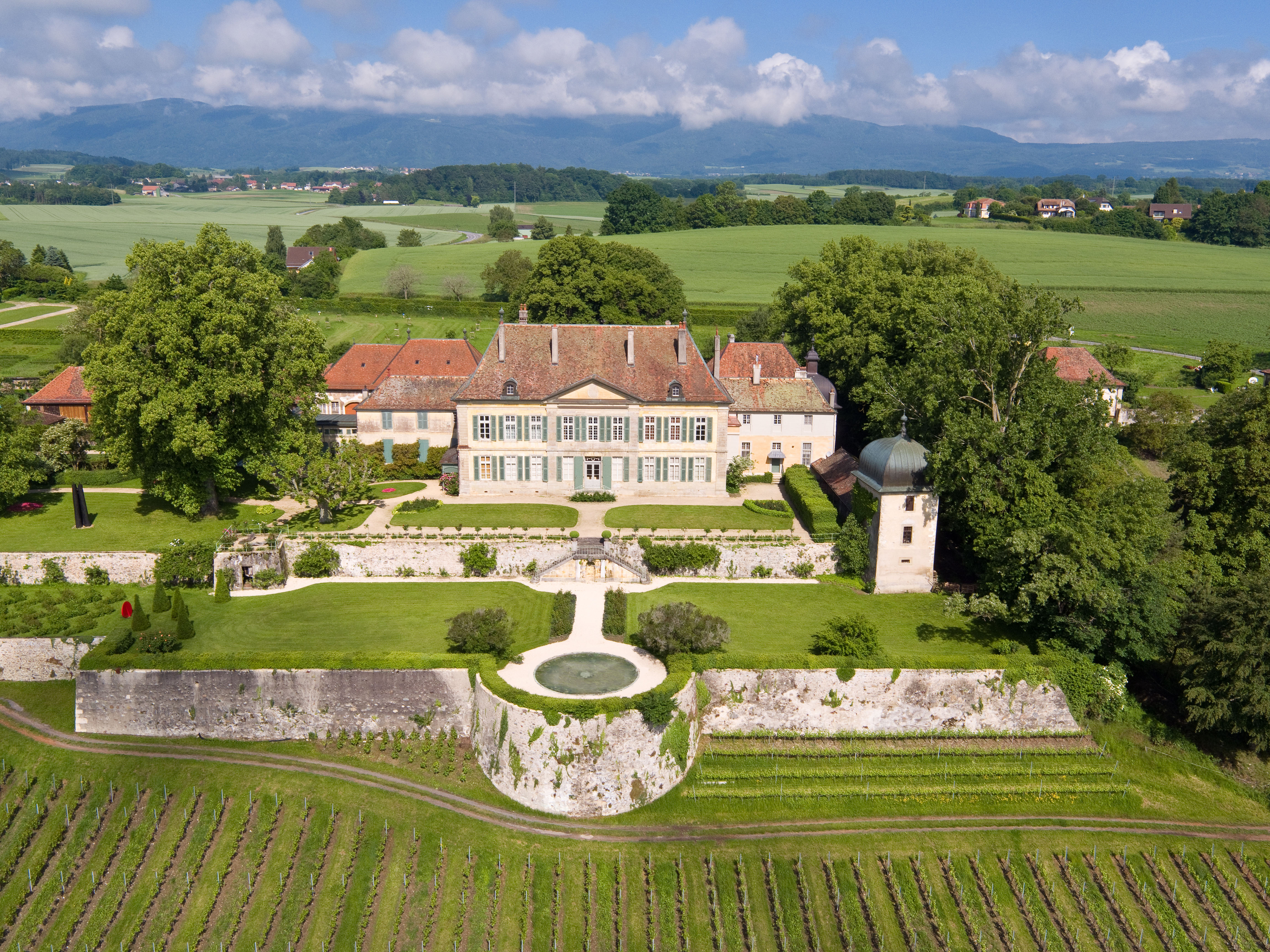
- Vullierens Castle and its surroundings

Location
- Location within Canton of Vaud Location within Switzerland
- Coordinates: 46°34′16″N 6°28′48″E

Swiss Cultural Property of National Significance

Vullierens Castle is a castle in the municipality of Vullierens in the Canton of Vaud, Switzerland. It is a Swiss heritage site of national significance. An estate of over one hundred hectares, owned by the same family for over 700 years either by marriage or inheritance.

== History ==
The first fortified house, also called Château-Vieux, was built on the hill of Vullierens above Morges in 1308 by Pierre de Duin, from a branch of the lords of Duin de Châtel de Conflans, originally from Geneva. It was in the form of a Savoyard square protected by two enclosures of which only two towers still remain.

The present castle was built between 1706 and 1712 by Gabriel-Henri de Mestral as a country residence with numerous outbuildings, including a theatre. He had received the estate following a legal action, his uncle, the former owner, having initially chosen to donate it to one of his cousins Bernard de Budé.

The estate remained in the Mestral family until the end of the 19th century when Georgina de Mestral passed it on to her husband, Samuel Bovet. The Bovet family still owns the property today.

The entire building and its outbuildings are listed as Swiss cultural property of national importance.

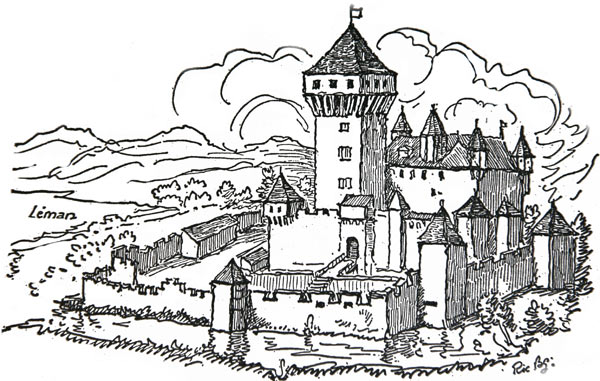
Château de Vullierens in 1308 as a fortified house.

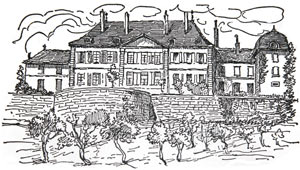
The actual castle

== Castle architecture ==
When Gabriel-Henri de Mestral inherited the seigneury, the medieval castle was in a sorry state. He demolished it to rebuild on its ruins a French classical residence, with numerous outbuildings including an orangery.

Some remains of the imposing medieval building remain: the terrace retaining walls to the south-east and the two towers to the north-east of the castle, with imperial roofs in the 18th century. One of them still has its 1740 clock.

Thanks to a plot dating from 1685, we know that the medieval castle was surrounded by a crenellated double wall and had a garden and an orchard. According to this old plan, the building had three-storey main buildings, connected by half a dozen towers, one of which was particularly imposing.

Although the plans of the castle cannot be found and the identity of the architect remains unknown to this day, the castle of Vullierens is typical of French classicism, of which it is one of the first examples in Switzerland. It is surrounded by a large formal French garden.

The castle is composed of a main building flanked by two wings in the same alignment. The main façade, facing southeast, has two levels and nine spans. The central avant-corps, which extends over three spans, is surmounted by a triangular pediment in which Mestral's sculpted arms are found. Corner chains with slits delimit the façade as well as the front body. The two floors are punctuated by large bays separated by soberly moulded cords. The courtyard façade is similar, with the exception of its central front which occupies only one bay, also surmounted by a triangular pediment with the arms of de Mestral. The main courtyard is bounded by a gate and a portal surmounted once again by the coat of arms of the owners. The roof of the castle is four sided with a coyaux.

The outbuildings are all of a similar architectural style with the main building. The orangery was rebuilt around 1770–1780.

Castle in 1744

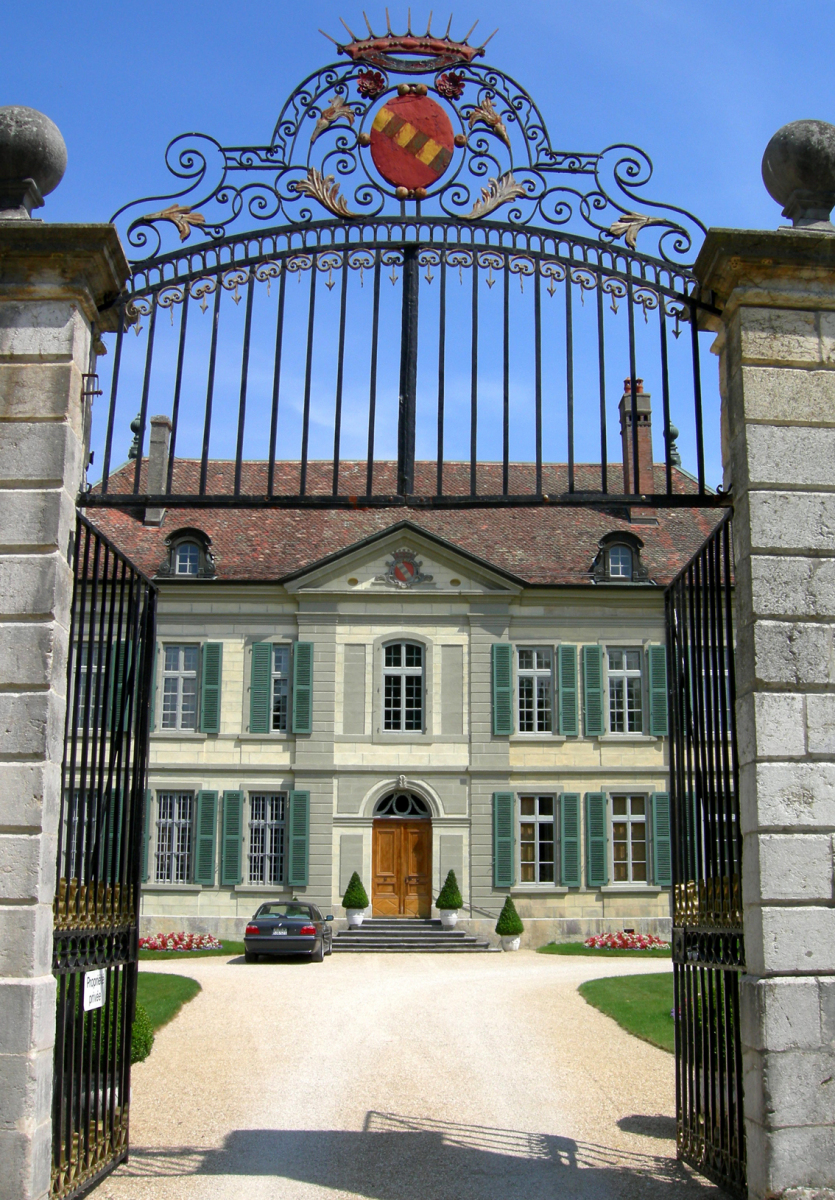
The castle gate and front facade

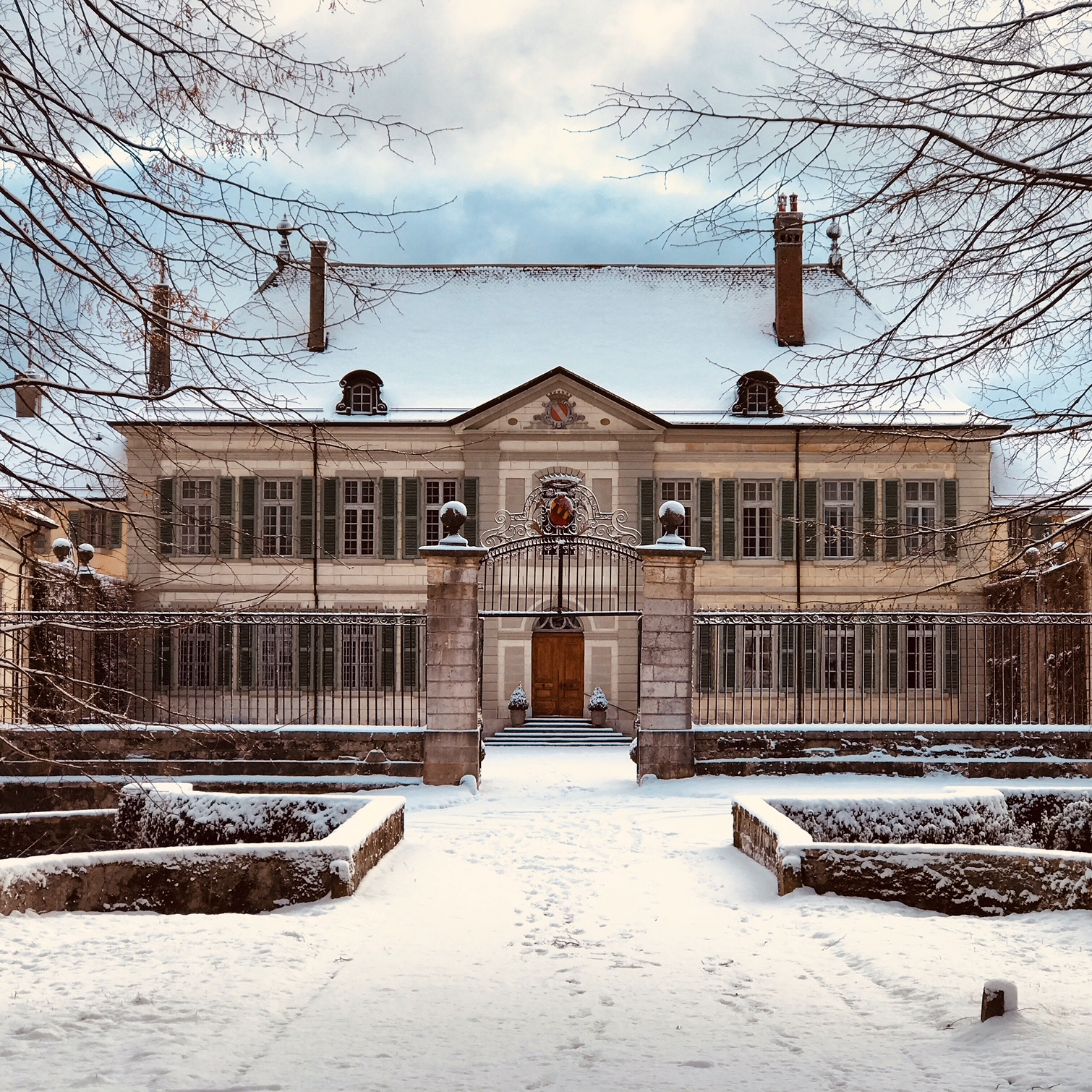
The castle in Winter

== The gardens ==
The gardens of the castle, called "jardin d'Iris", created by the owner, Doreen Bovet, during the 20th century, are famous for their collection of nearly 50,000 irises visible from late April to late July, more than 400 different varieties: dwarf irises, middlemen, borders, garden irises and Spurias irises. There is also a collection of late tulips, rhododendrons, peonies, roses and lily-lilies among the 7 theme gardens presented: Doreen Garden, Dorianne Garden, Daria Garden, Bunny's Shade Garden, Secret Garden, Muni Garden and Summer Garden. Each garden has taken the names of the people who have marked the history of the castle.

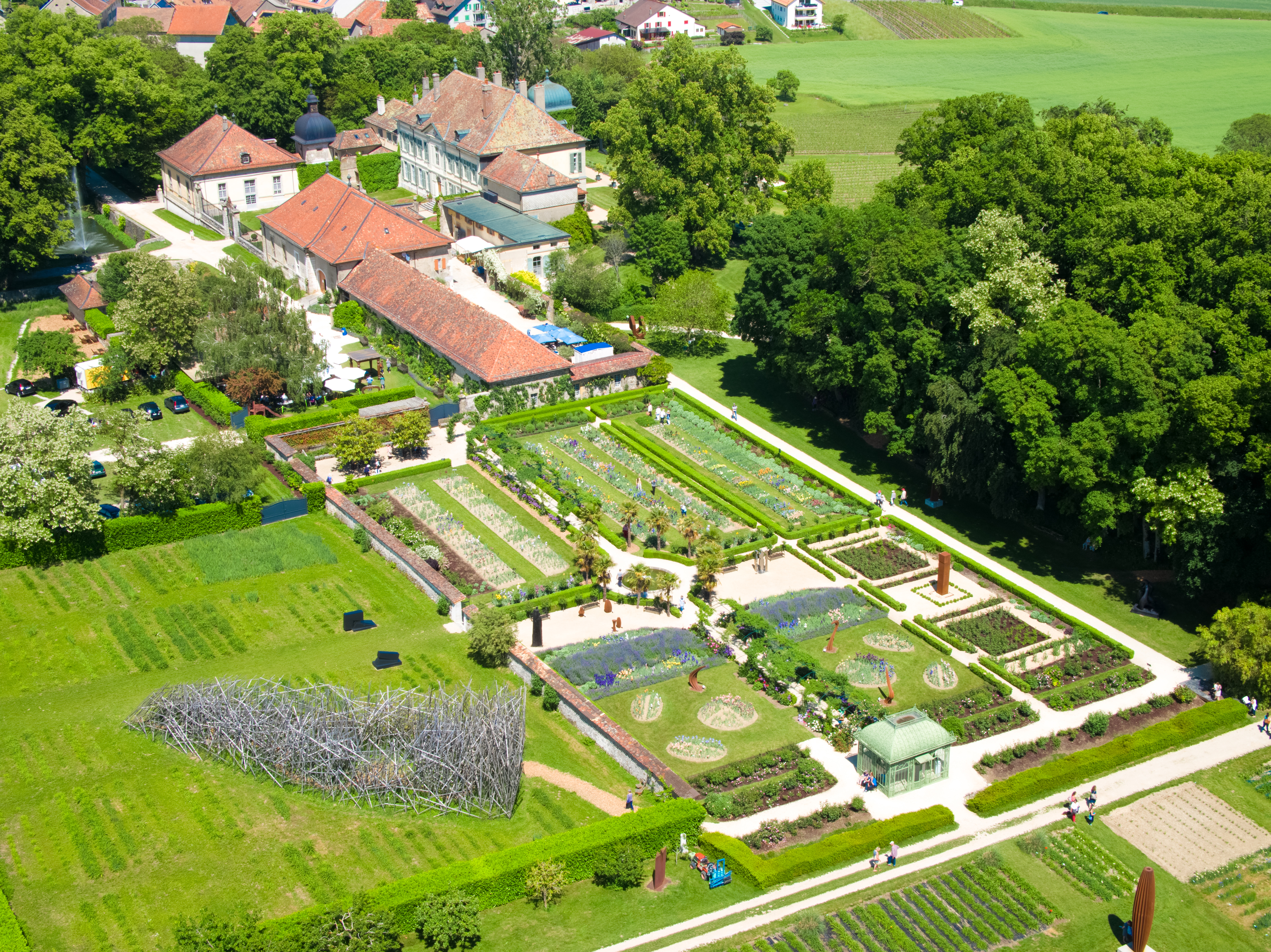
Aerial view of Doreen's garden

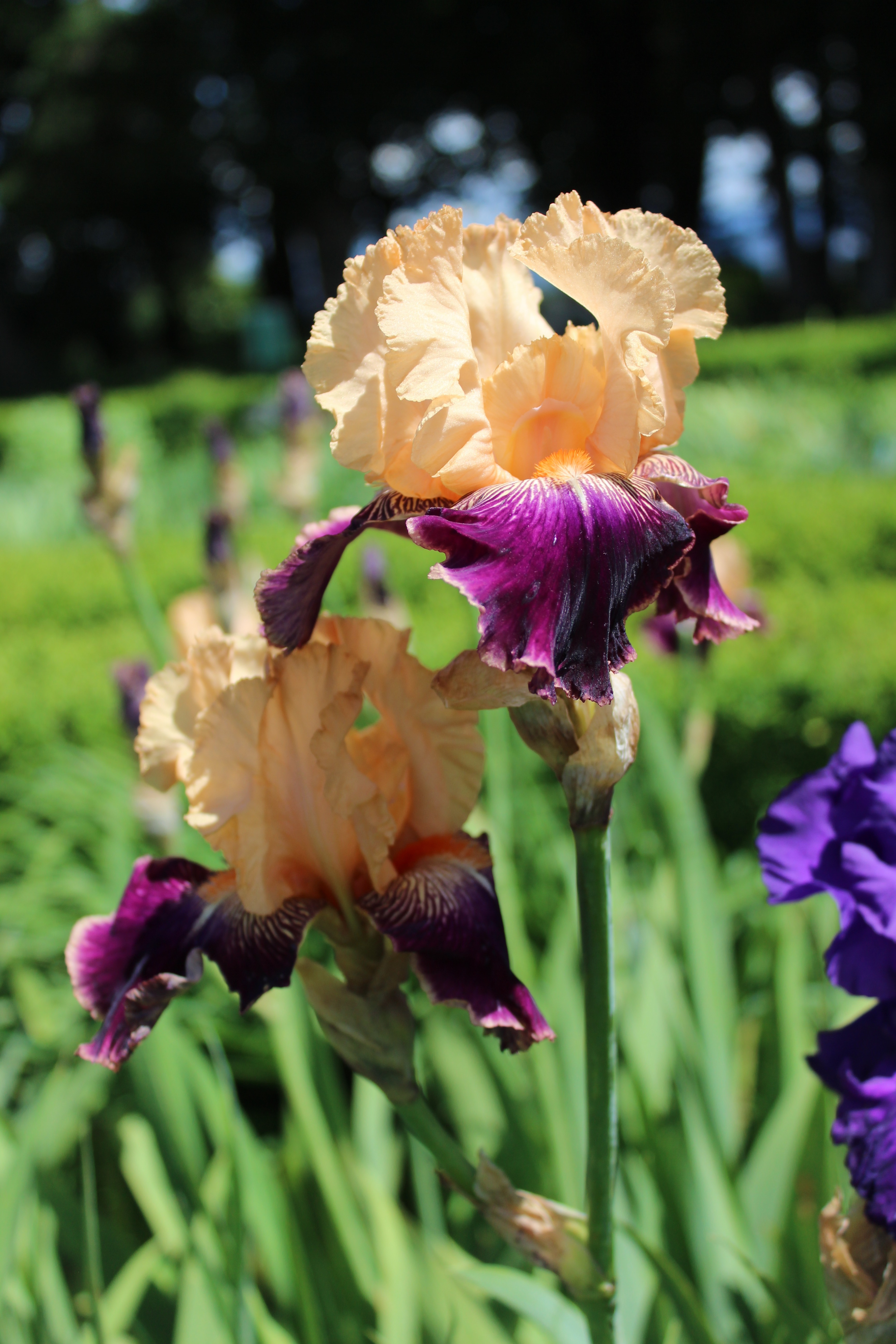
Border iris present in the gardens of Château de Vullierens

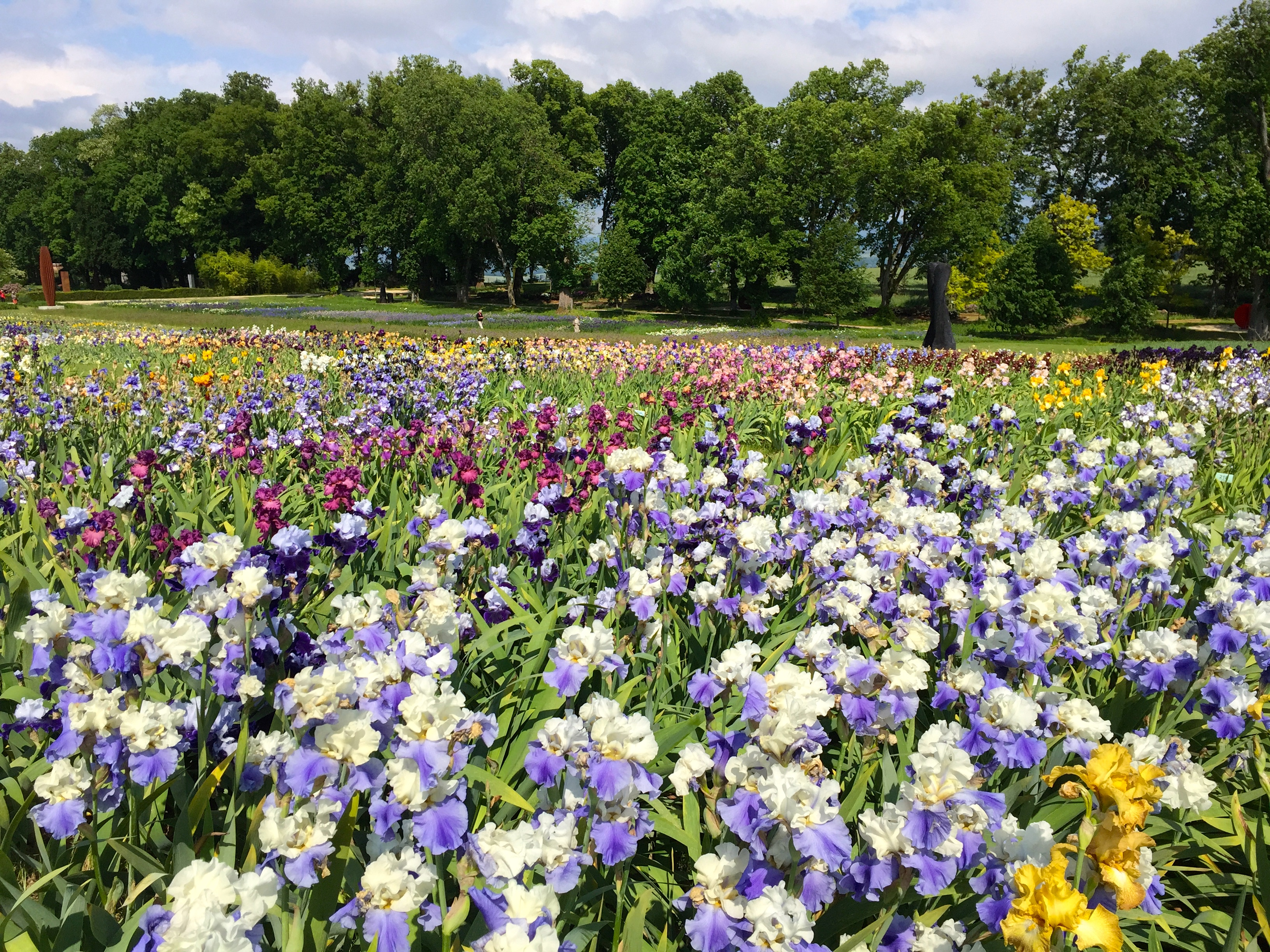
Irises filed at the Château Vullierens

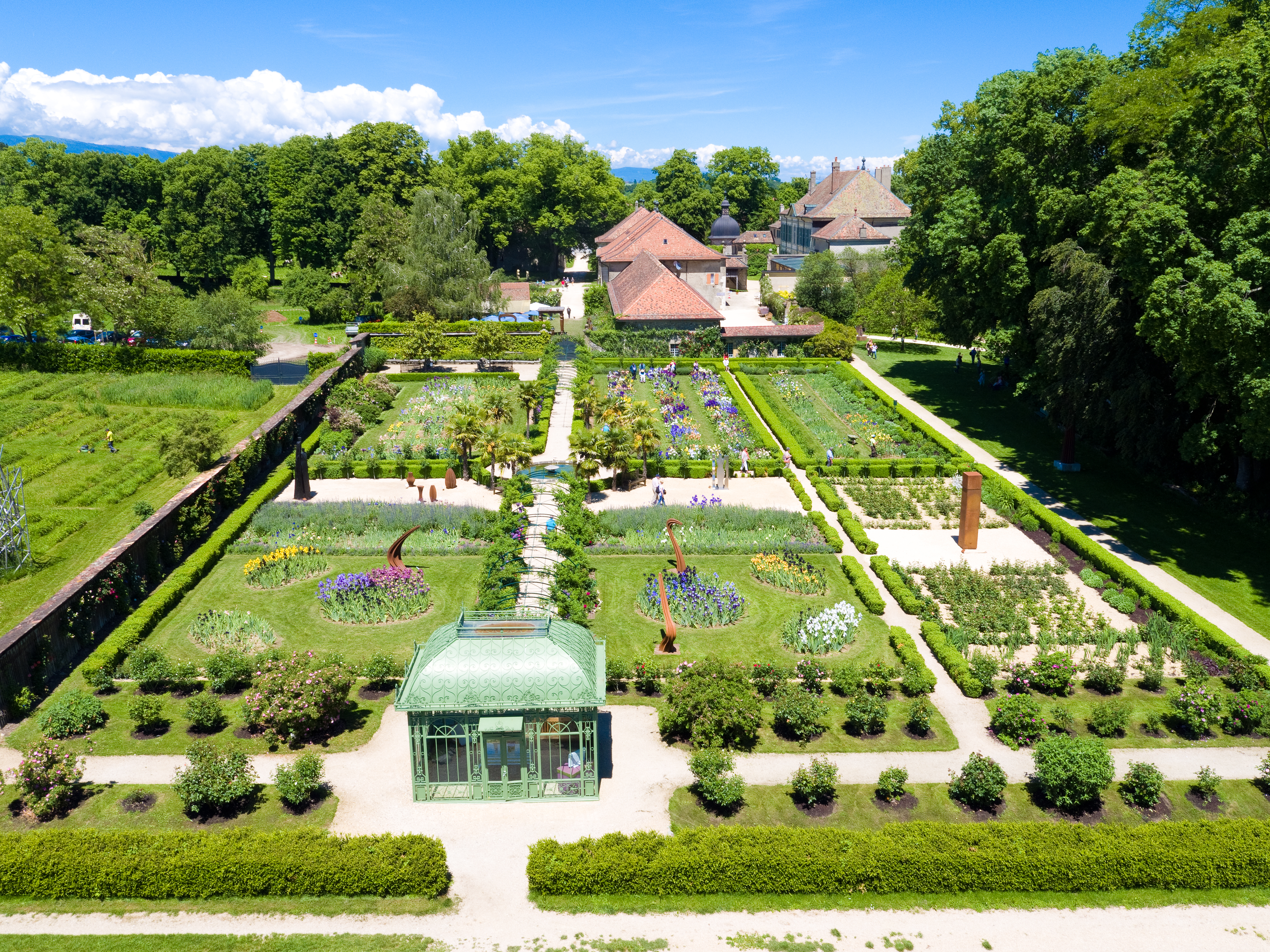
Doreen's Garden, Château de Vullierens.

== The sculptures ==
Within the garden there are several pieces of steel art by the Spanish artist Manuel Torres. About 70 sculptures have been on display in the gardens. These include the Corten steel sculpture My Twist by American artist Beverly Pepper as well as the installation of the Swiss Mireille Fulpius, a labyrinth of intertwined pine joists, ten installations by Frenchman Christian Lapie representing characters made of burnt oak then oiled and painted black. In 2018 sculptures by the Belgian designer Pol Quadens, the English Laura Ford, the Irish Dorothy Cross, the Spanish Carles Valverde and the Cuban Manuel Carbonell were added to the garden.

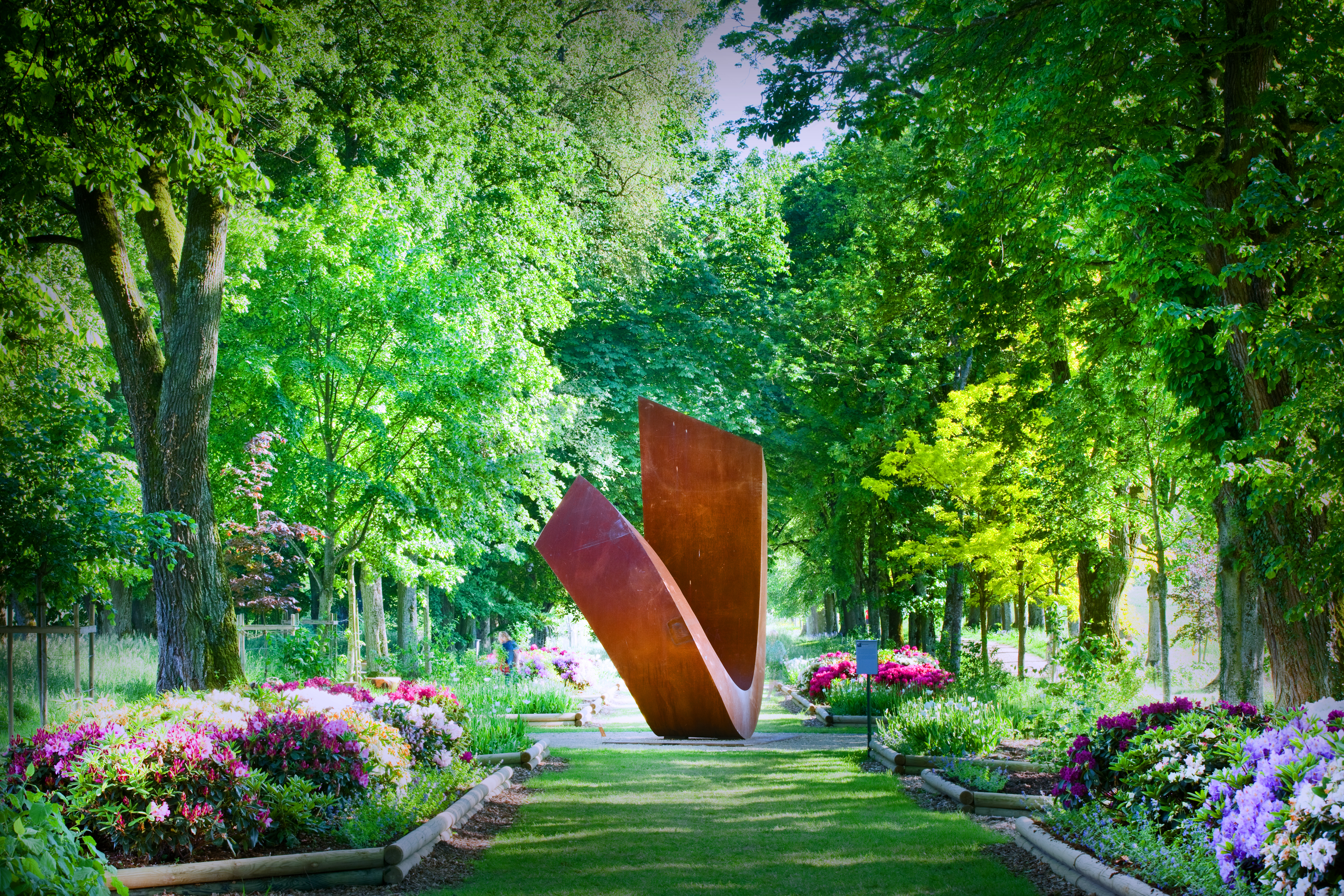
The sculpture done by Beverly Pepper in Muni's Garden.

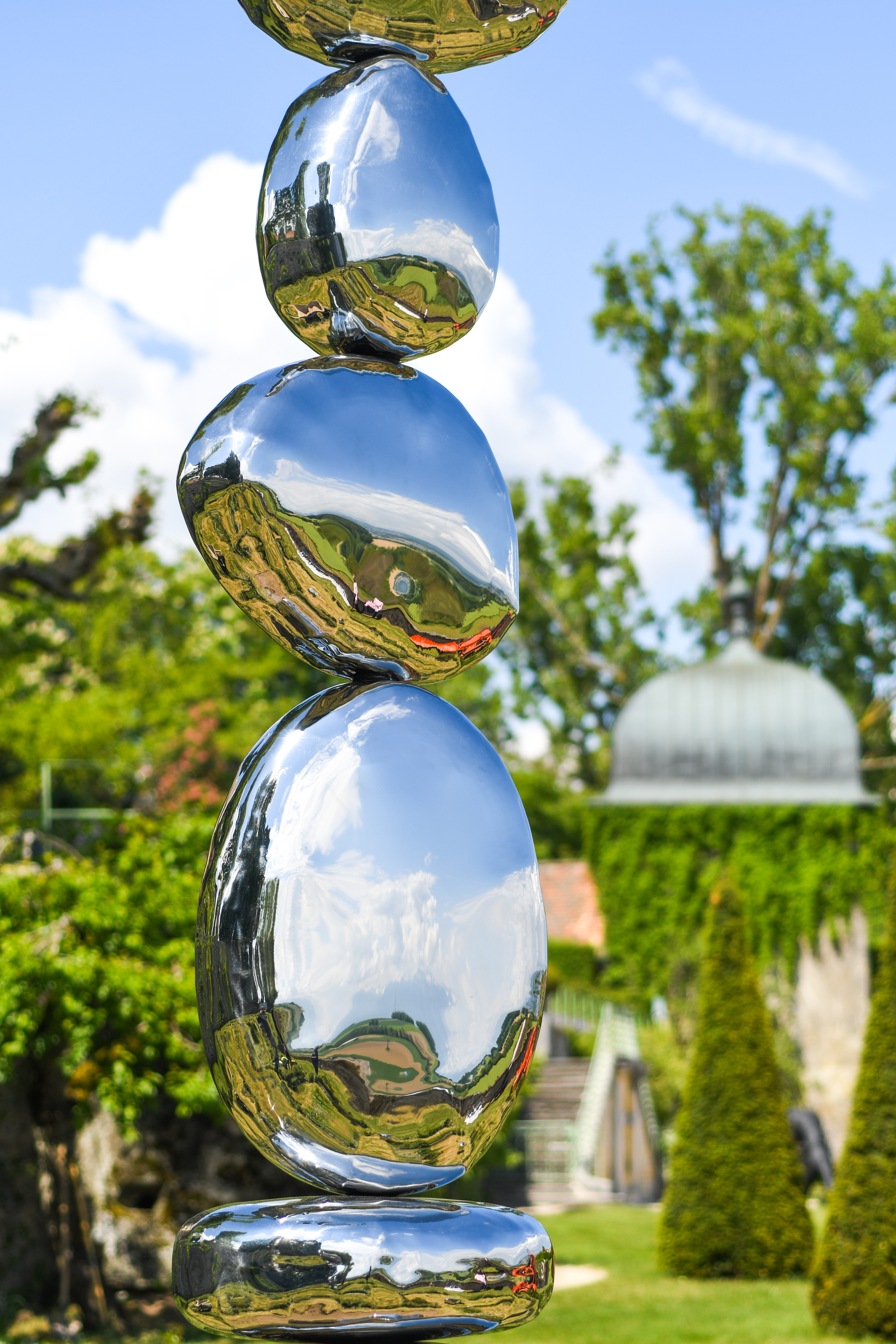
A close up of Pol Quadens artwork exhibited on the terrasse of the castle.

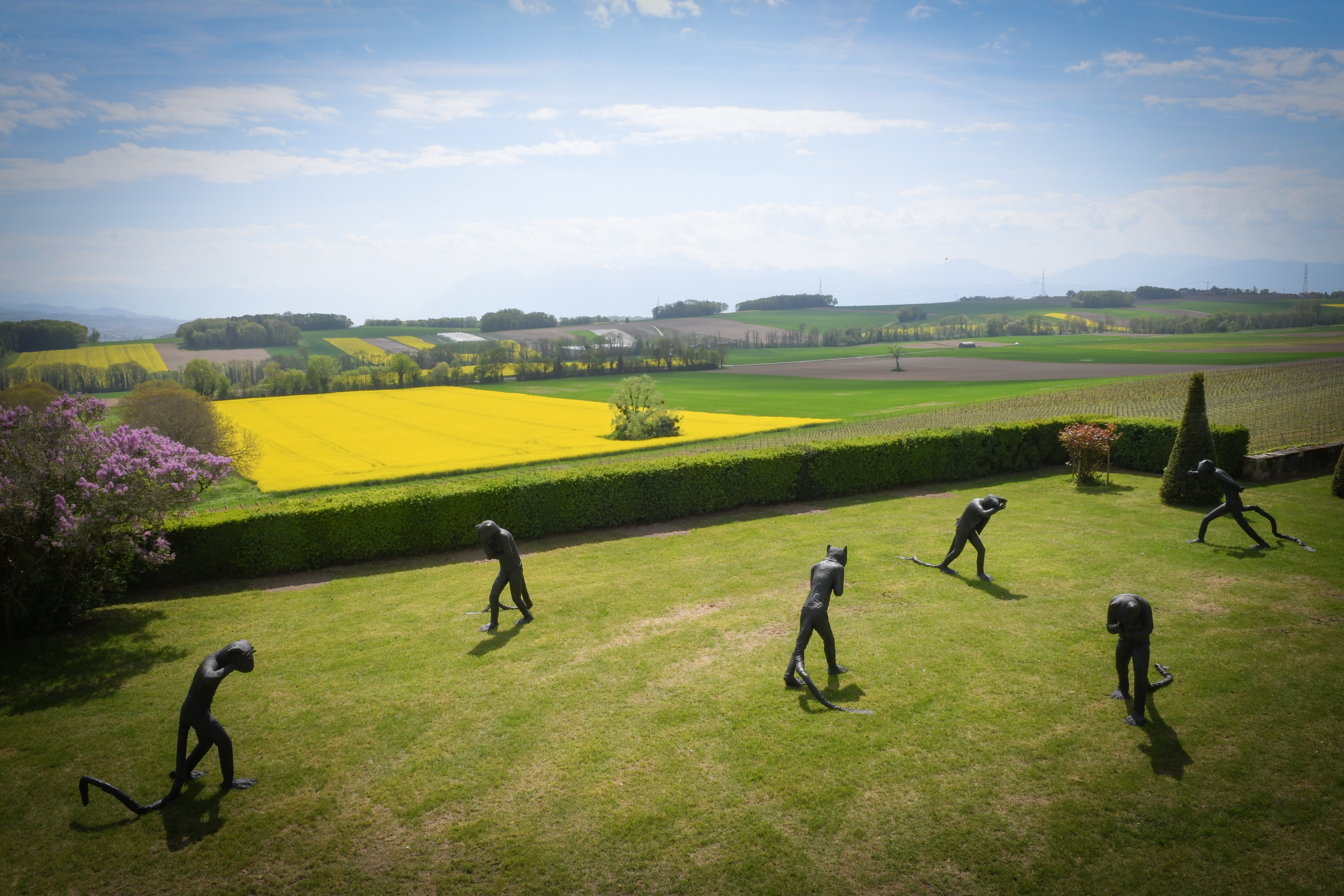
The six giants cats of Laura Ford on the terrasse of the castle.

== The vineyard and the historical cellars ==
The estate also includes a vineyard where Chasselas, Pinot Noir, Gamay, Gamaret, Garanoir and Galotta are grown and sold directly to the estate. The historic vineyards extend south of the Château over more than 7 hectares. For many years, environmentally friendly viticulture has been practiced throughout the estate. Parcel monitoring of ripeness to choose the harvest date, yields limited to the vine, manual harvesting with sorting of the grapes into boxes to preserve the integrity of the berries. Under one of the outbuildings of the Château, on the eastern side, is the main cellar of the estate. It dates from the beginning of the 18th century, before the construction of the current Castle, probably built on the foundations of the old fortified castle. Elegantly vaulted, fresh as can be and with a floor covered with round paving stones, it contains six large oval oak vases with a total capacity of 73,000 litres. There are also two palm presses dating from the 19th century. These historic cellars were restored in 1979 by Gilbert Hammel of the house of the same name in Rolle, who has been managing the estate's vines and production since 1975. Until 2012, the harvest was pressed and stored in these cellars by the Château's winegrower.

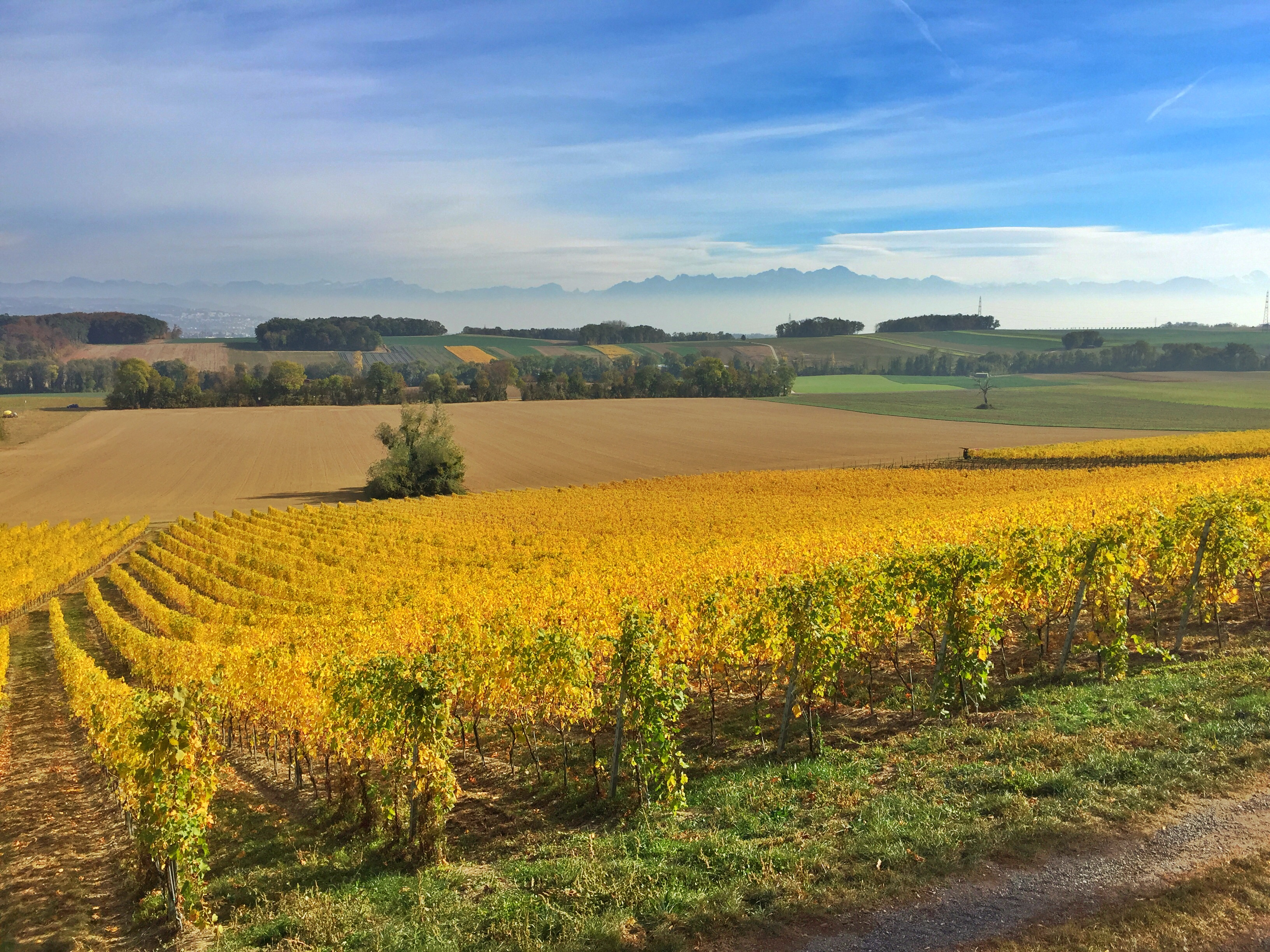
The vineyards of the castle in Autumn 2018

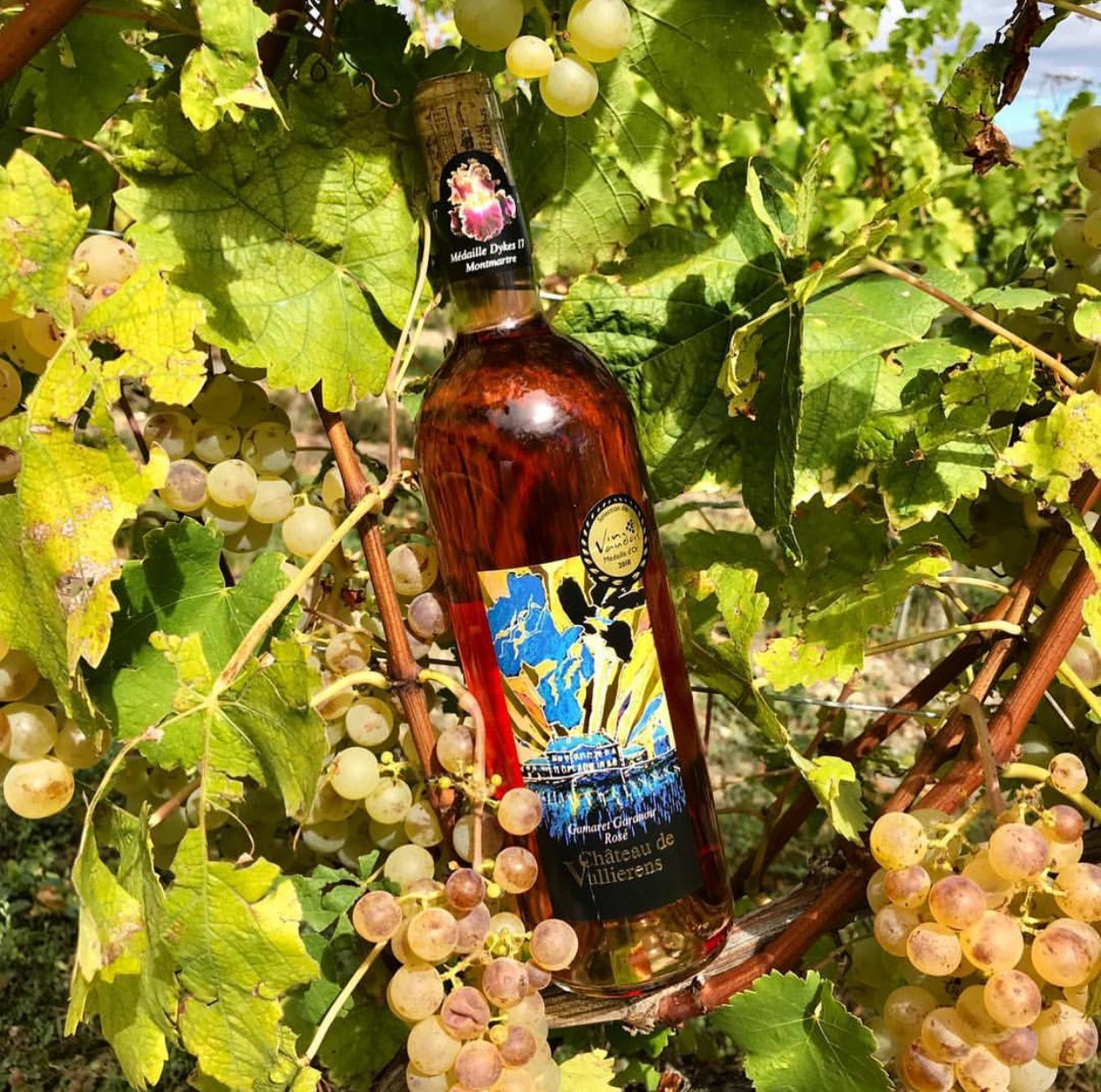
The Rosé bottle in the vineyards of the castle

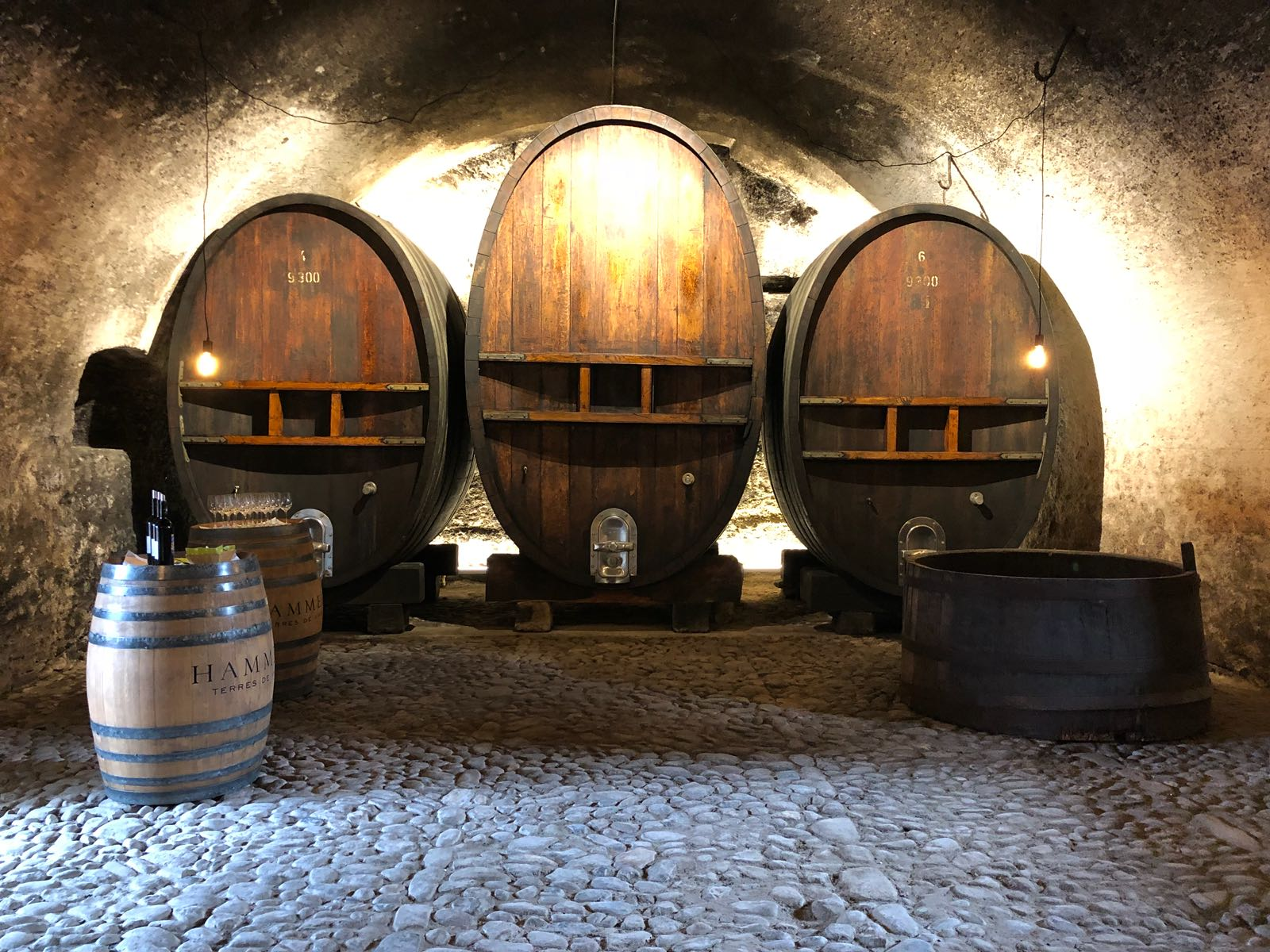
The historical cellars of the castle

== Portes des Iris ==
The Collonges farm (the Estate's farm) was built immediately after the reconstruction and redevelopment of the Castle in its current form (1712–1745). It housed about forty heads of cattle. Restored, transformed and converted in 1998, the Collonges farm in Vullierens is now called "Portes des Iris" because of the six glass doors decorated with wrought iron that replaced the wooden ones that gave access to the stables and the barn. It was the artist Dorianne Destenay who, at the beginning of the transformations, was amazed by the view that opened up to her through the six vaulted doors that were wide open for the works. Inspired by the beauty of the garden and the surrounding landscape, she imagined them in glass to preserve the view, then decorated each door with a different wrought iron motif stylized to evoke the irises and birds of the garden.

The ground floor is designed to host events with a capacity of up to 100 people. The modular floor, with a surface area of 550 m2, can accommodate up to 500 visitors. On more than 1000 m2, seven different and modular rooms open on three levels. Under the impressive original framework, the huge attic room is an exclusive place. Not to mention a gigantic garden terrace, with a view of Lake Geneva and the Alps, on which specific tents can be set up for major events.

In 2007, Portes des Iris was approved by the State of Vaud as an exceptional place for civil ceremonies. In an idyllic setting, the former farmhouse has established itself as a major venue for events of all kinds, company events or weddings. The purpose of the commercial company is to invest the profits in the conservation of the castle.

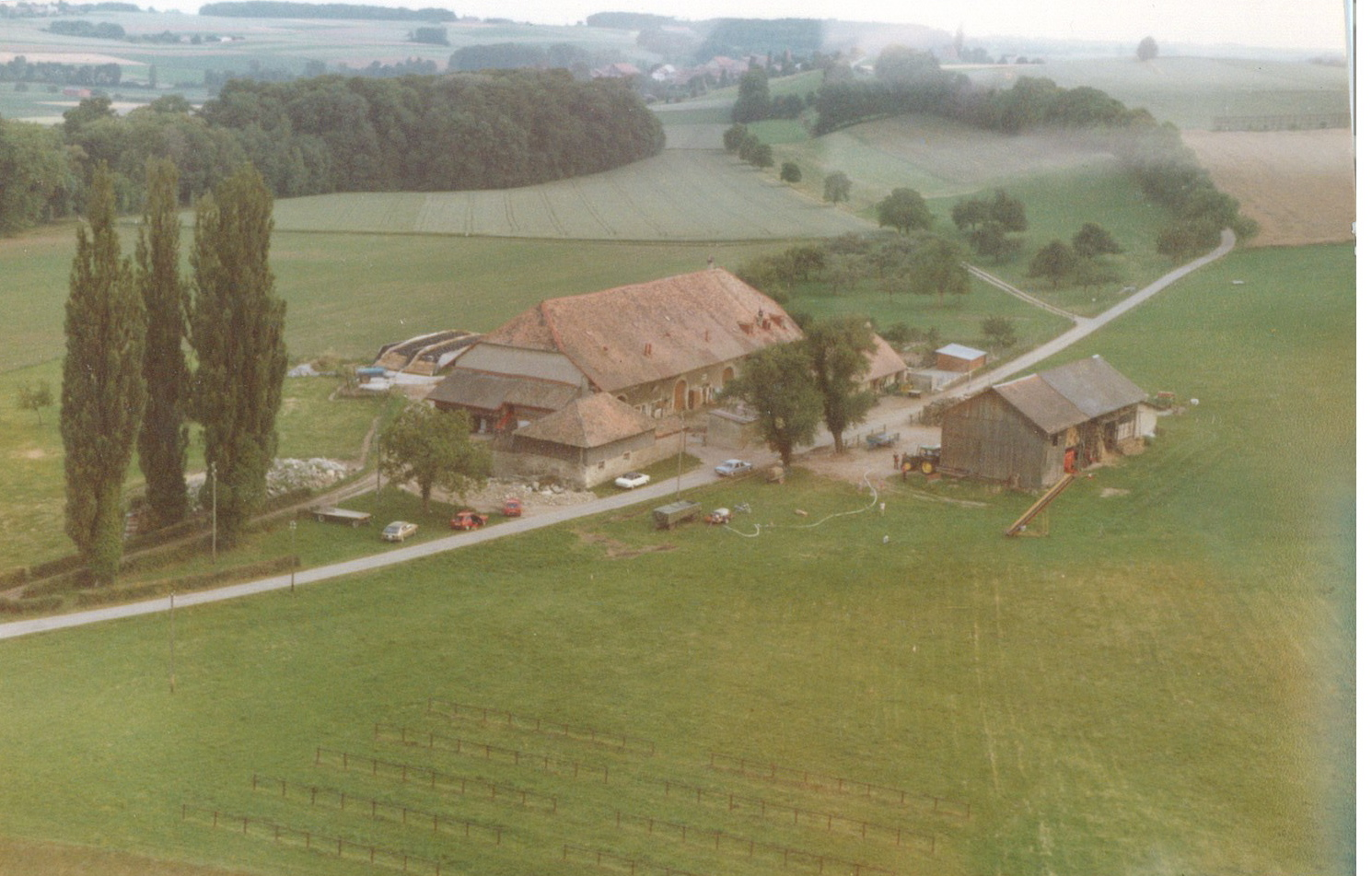
Old farm of the Château de Vullierens, dating from the 18th century

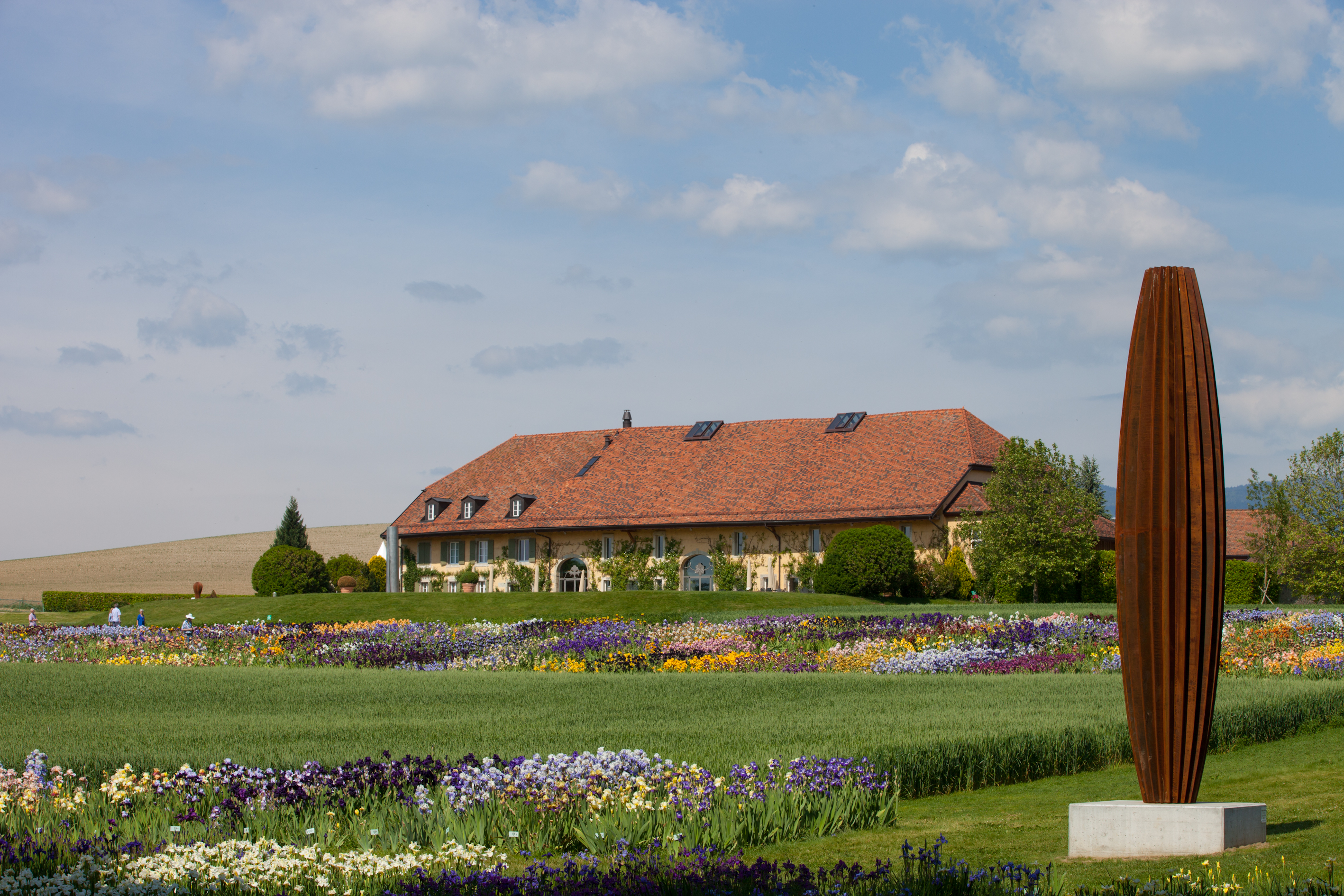
Old farm renovated in 1998

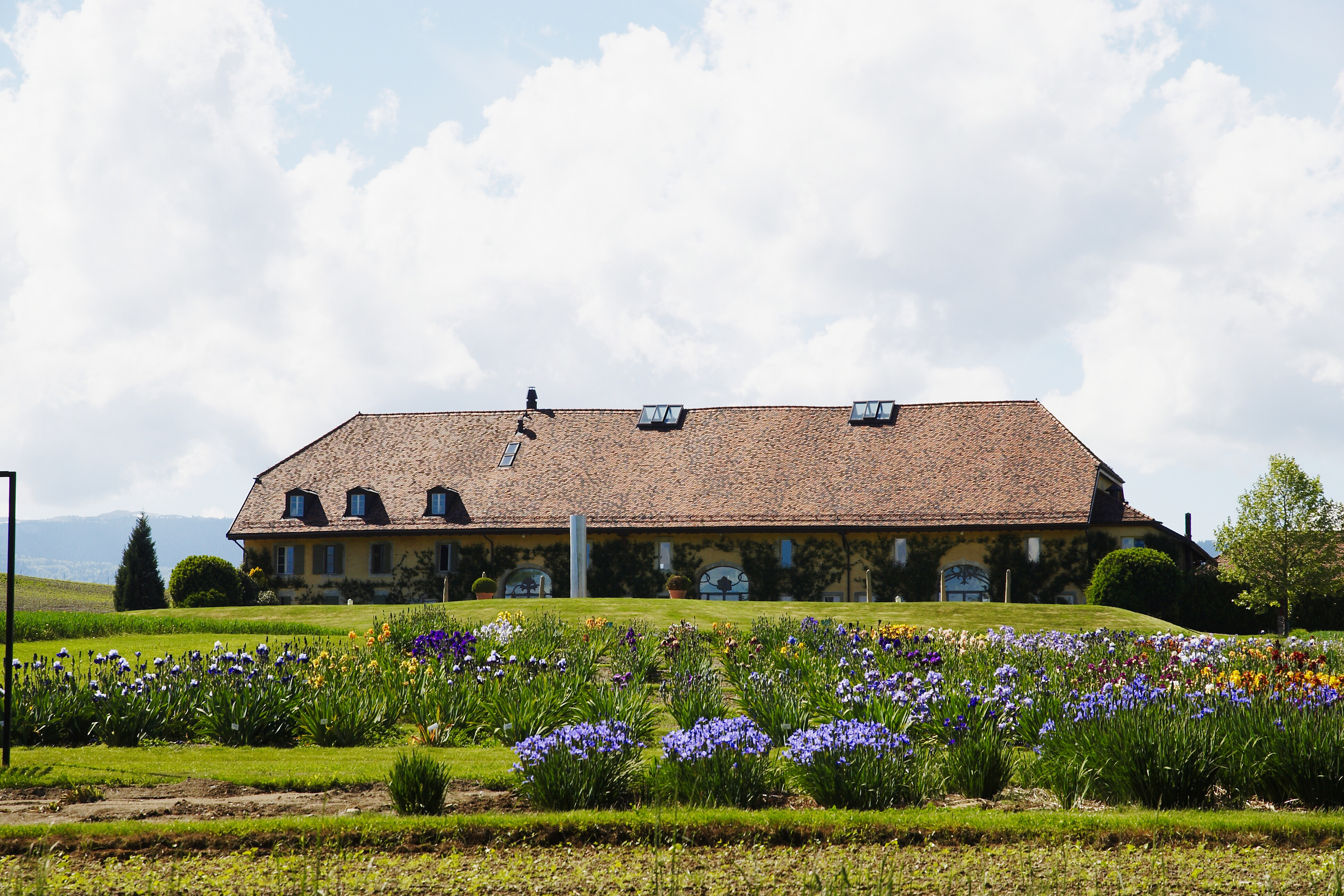
Portes des Iris, private events organization venue

== See also ==
- List of castles in Switzerland
- Château
