= Seebach, Baden-Württemberg =

Seebach
- Municipality
- Coat of arms

- Location of Seebach within Ortenaukreis district
- Interactive map of Seebach
- Location within Germany Location within Baden-Württemberg
- Coordinates: 48°34′36″N 08°10′34″E
- Country: Germany
- State: Baden-Württemberg
- Admin. region: Freiburg
- District: Ortenaukreis

Government
  - Mayor (2017–25): Reinhard Schmälzle

Area
  - Total: 19.04 km^{2} (7.35 sq mi)
- Elevation: 602 m (1,975 ft)

Population (2025-12-31)
  - Total: 1,417
  - Density: 74.42/km^{2} (192.8/sq mi)
- Time zone: UTC+01:00 (CET)
  - Summer (DST): UTC+02:00 (CEST)
- Postal codes: 77889
- Dialling codes: 07842
- Vehicle registration: OG, BH, KEL, LR, WOL
- Website: www.seebach.de

Seebach (German pronunciation: [ˈzeːbax]) is a town in the district of Ortenau in Baden-Württemberg in Germany.
