= Alexanderschanze =

Mountain pass in southern Germany

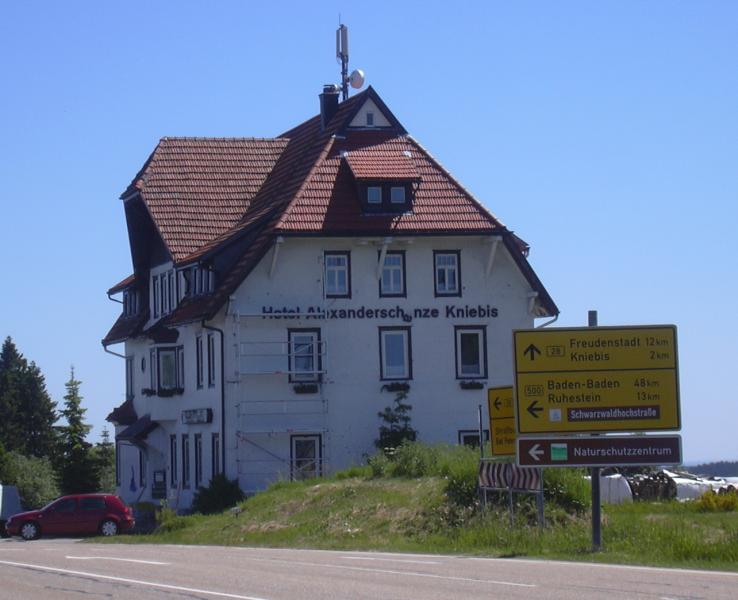
- Hotel Alexanderschanze
- Interactive map of Alexanderschanze
- Elevation: 970.8DE-NHN
- Traversed by: Pass road

Third Approach
- Location: Baden-Württemberg
- Range: Black Forest
- Coordinates: 48°28′51″N 8°16′35″E

The Alexanderschanze (Alexander's Redoubt) is a mountain pass, 970.8 m above sea level (NHN), on the B 28 federal road at Freudenstadt in the Northern Black Forest in southern Germany. In the vicinity is also a fortification and hotel of the same name.

== Pass ==
The Alexanderschanze Pass lies between Freudenstadt-Kniebis, Bad Peterstal-Griesbach, Oppenau and Baiersbronn and provides a connection between the Rhine Plain at Strasbourg and the Neckar valley, which allows the Black Forest to be crossed from east to west without any other major valley crossings and pass ascents.

North of the present-day Kniebis-Freudenstadt road, which largely runs along the Forbach valley, there are routes called the Alte Straße ("Old Road") and even Römerstraße ("Roman Road"). Even if there are no reliable sources that the Romans built this road, it can be safely assumed that the pass was on a long-distance route in the early Middle Ages; this is also evidenced by tracks found in the forest. In this context, "track" refers to the grooves left by wooden wheels shod with steel bands that can still be seen in the rock today.

== Fortress ==
According to Stälin, the Bishop of Strasbourg, John of Dirpheim (bishop from 1306 to 1328) had fortifications built in the Kniebis. In 1655 there were already military redoubts at that location. The location of this fortification is documented for the first time on a 1674 map by Georg Ludwig Stäbenhaber.

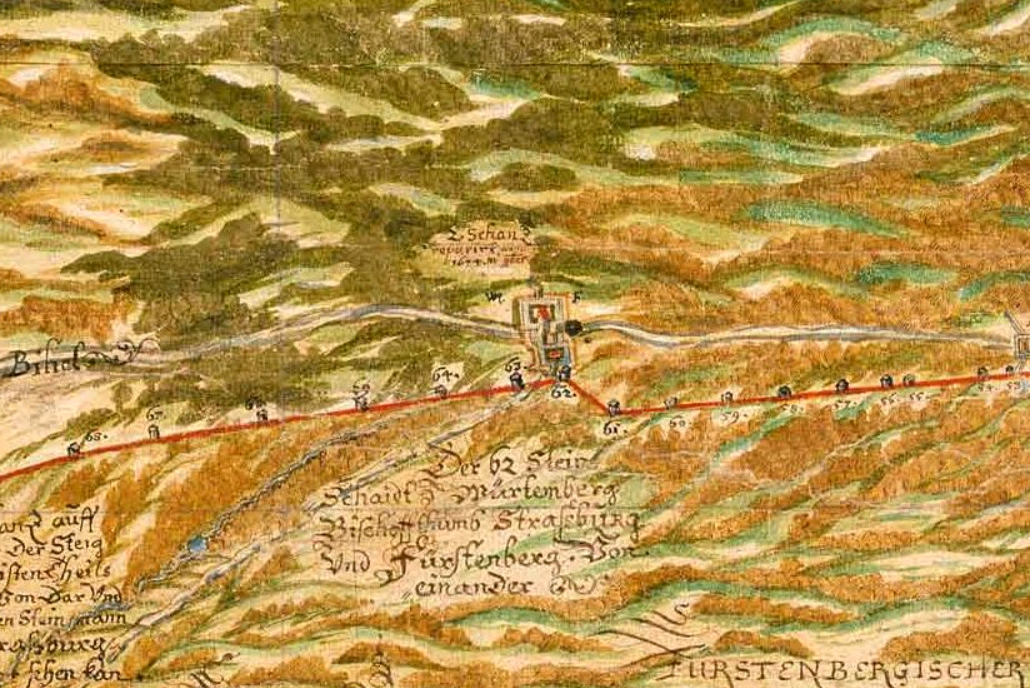
Section of the 1674 map by Stäbenhaber

The comment on the map, "2nd Redoubt repaired on 9 November 1674", also proves that older facilities must have been present. The construction measures carried out in 1674 and 1675 were directed by Stäbenhaber himself. According to Stäbenhaber, the "2nd Redoubt" consisted of two simple rectangular redoubts. These could be used to close the road from Oppenau through the raised bog to a refuge location.

From 1710 to 1712 the fortification was rebuilt under the direction of Lieutenant Reichmann. He completely redesigned the complex: two redoubts, an abatis to the left and right, the road, which was additionally guarded by a gate, leading through the works between the two redoubts.

It was given the name Alexanderschanze in 1734, when Duke Charles Alexander of Württemberg had the existing schanze modernized for the military security of the strategically important crossing on the Württemberg border. The work was led by the engineer, von Herbort.

In 1796, additional extensions were made by French troops. During the War of the Second Coalition (1799–1801) the front between Austrian and French troops ran through here at times.

On a 19th-century land map the two schanzen are drawn in detail, including the trenches that extend far to the north-west and with trenches between the two schanzen in the shape of another similar schanze.

=== Condition ===
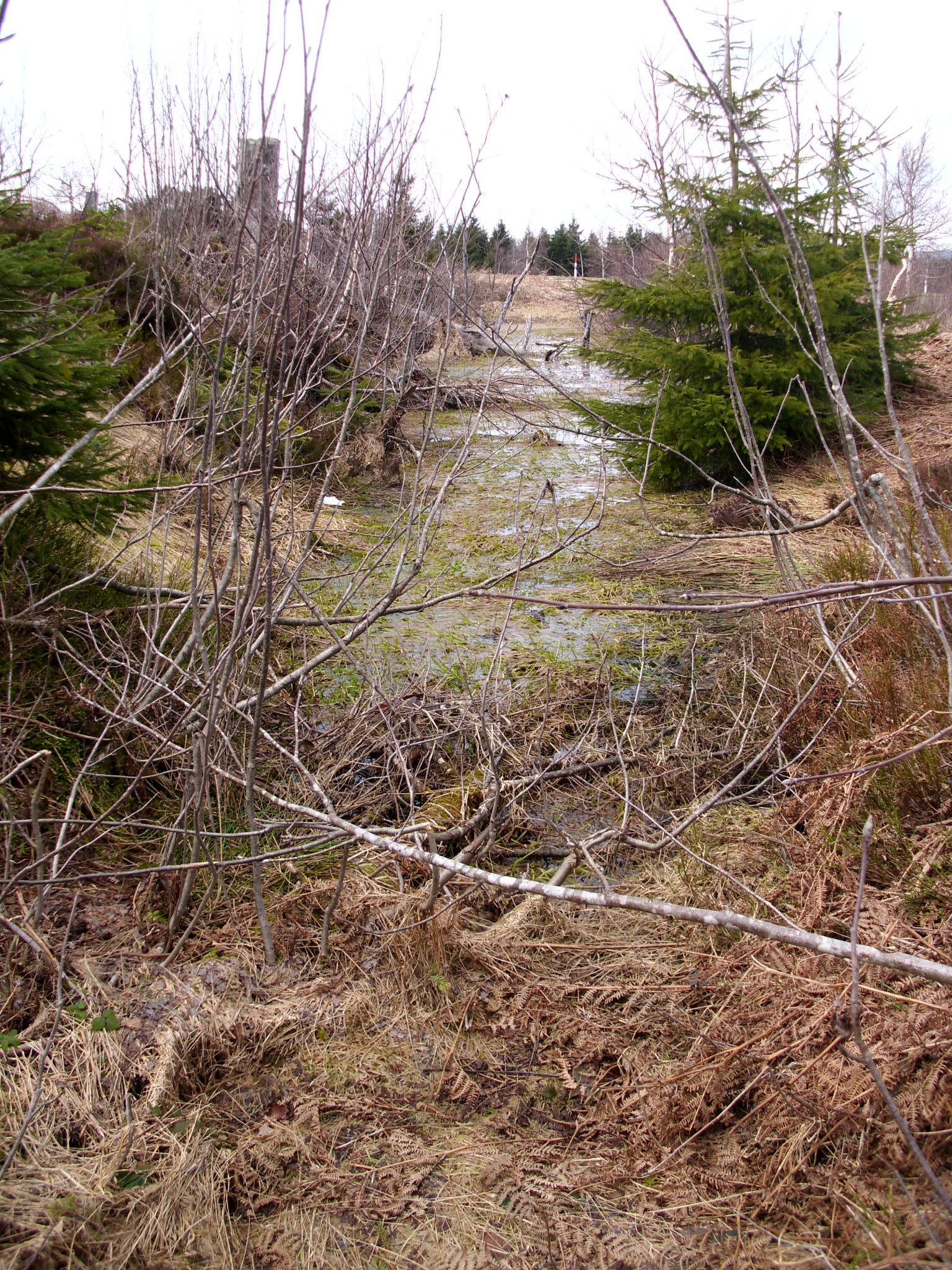
The Alexanderschanze: remains of a ditch, filled with water

The schanze north of the Hotel Alexanderschanze is exceptionally well preserved. It measures 4–5 metres from the bottom of the ditch to the top of the bank and there is a height difference of 2–3 metres between the ground of the interior and the top of the bank. The bank is interrupted at the north-west corner, i.e. in the direction of the Oppenauer Steige, a mountain path. Inside, at the south-east corner, a large heap of rubble and earth indicates the remains of the building. The schanze is easily accessible.

The banks of the other schanze, west of the hotel, are lower (2 metres in height or less in places) and damaged. Its banks and the interior are heavily overgrown and difficult to access.

There are few visible traces of the earlier trenches. Only at the schanze opposite the hotel has a 20 metre long section been well preserved. It leads from the north corner towards the NNW, i.e. towards the refuge location.

== Hotel Alexanderschanze ==
The listed hiking hotel on the pass, the Hotel Alexanderschanze, traces its history to an 1868 forester's lodge. This burned down in 1911 and was replaced by the present building. The hotel has been closed since 1 January 2015.

== Second World War bunker ==
Shortly before 1940, new defensive systems were built as part of the Siegfried Line. At the same time the extension of the Black Forest High Road (the B 500) from Ruhestein also had a military purpose. In the summer of 1940, Adolf Hitler spent just one week in his nearby headquarters, the Führerhauptquartier Tannenberg.

After 1945, all the bunker systems in this area were blown up and the area reforested. Today the spruce forest and the heritage site form the 190-hectare nature reserve of Kniebis-Alexanderschanze, south-east of the Schliffkopf.

== See also ==
- Röschenschanze
- Schwedenschanze (Zuflucht)

== Literature ==
- Manfred Eimer: Zu Kniebis auf dem Walde, Geschichtliche Zusammenfassung über den Kniebis und die Kniebisbäder, Erwin Schmieder's Druckerei und Verlag, Baiersbronn, 1954
- A. Hiss: Der Kniebis und die Kniebisbäder heute, Erwin Schmieder's Druckerei und Verlag, Baiersbronn, 1954
- Karte „Eigentlicher Grundriß des Freudenstädter Forstes mit seinen locken Mark- und Grenzsteinen, verfertigt von Johann Mayer, Prälat zu Murrhardt ann 1712“ http://www.landesarchiv-bw.de/plink/?f=1-1391525
