= Kniebis =

Mountain ridge in Germany

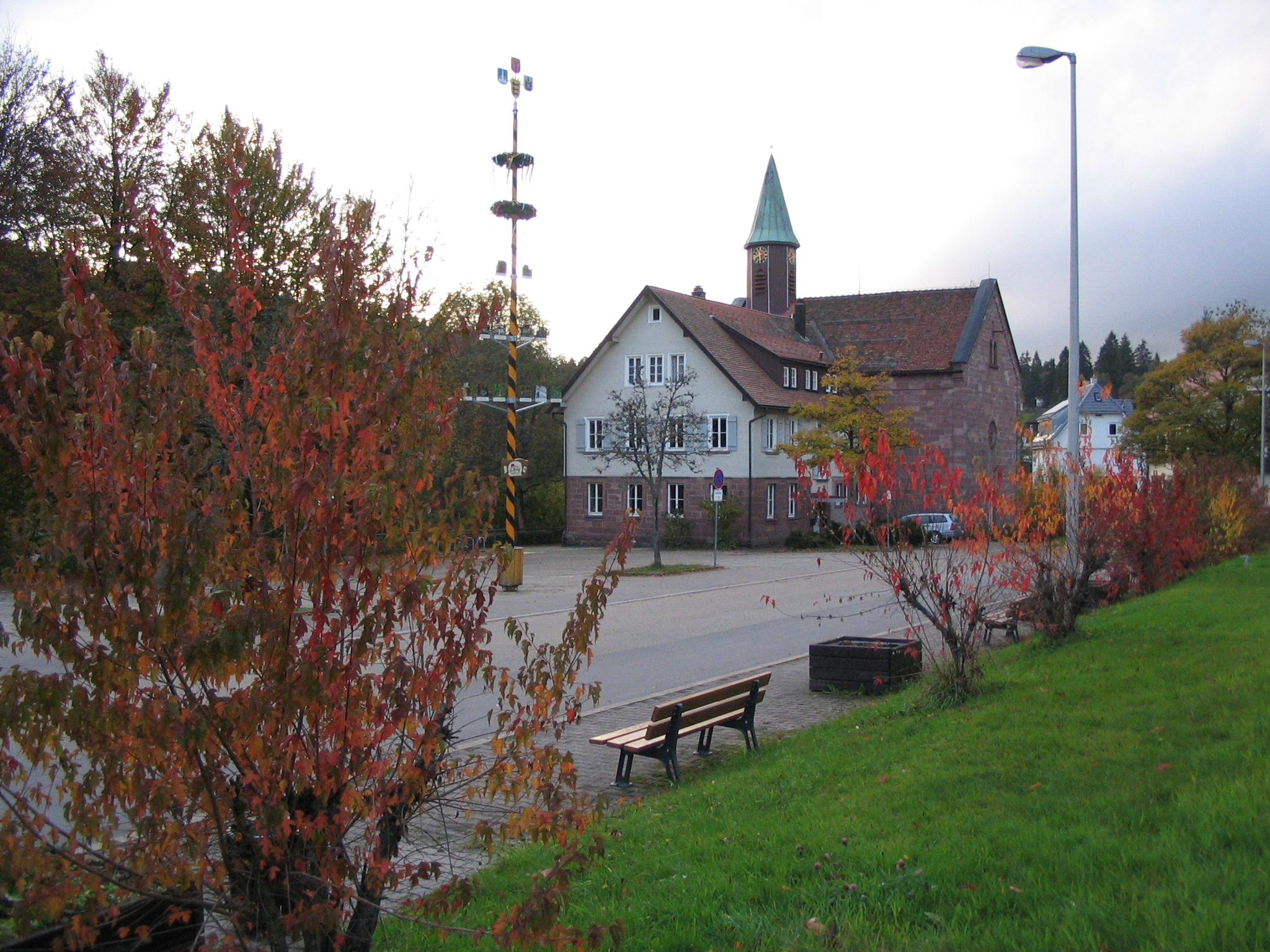
- The evangelical church and primary school on the Kniebis

Highest point
- Elevation: 970 m (3,180 ft)
- Coordinates: 48°28′35″N 08°17′38″E

Geography
- Location: Baden-Württemberg, Germany

The Kniebis is a 970 -metre-high mountain ridge in the Black Forest and the name of a village to the south which is a dispersed settlement. The Kniebis mountain rises in the state of Baden-Württemberg, Germany.

== Transport ==
The Kniebis lies on the Black Forest High Road that, as the B 28 federal highway approaches from Freudenstadt and continues from the mountain pass of Alexanderschanze as the B 500 to Baden-Baden. The B 28 itself continues to Kehl and Strasbourg. The Landesstraße 96 runs south in the direction of Hausach. The Kniebis is on the bus routes from Freudenstadt.

== Tourism ==
In winter there are numerous cross country skiing loipes, including one night trail with snow cannon and floodlights, as well as several ski lifts in the village and the surrounding area (Vogelskopf, Zuflucht and Kniebis lifts); in addition there is a toboggan run and various winter footpaths. In summer the Kniebis is a major mountain bike, Nordic walking and hiking area; in addition there is a fully renovated woodland lido. One nearby destination is the Lothar Path on the Black Forest High Road (B 500) in the direction of the Schliffkopf. On the western exit of the village is the Alexanderschanze, further north are the Röschenschanze and the Schwedenschanze.

== Economy ==
The village survives mainly on tourism. Winter sport facilities include several ski lifts (each with a height difference of about 100 metres), many kilometres of cut loipes and a toboggan run. The so-called night trail in the Kniebis Ski Stadium attracts a fee. a roughly 2-kilometre-long circular route in the immediate vicinity is floodlight when the weather conditions require and it can be entirely covered with artificial snow.

== Climate ==
The annual precipitation is 1886 mm. The precipitation is in the upper third of that recorded by weather stations of the German Weather Service, over 99% have lower values. The driest month is September; the greatest amount of precipitation is in January. In the wettest month about 1.4 times as much water falls as in the driest month. Seasonal variations lie in the upper third of all stations. In over 89% of all places the monthly precipitation varies less.

== Education ==
Kniebis has a kindergarten and a primary school. The primary school has an unusual architectural feature: it is built directly onto the evangelical church.

== History ==
In Early Modern times the Kniebis was a serious obstacle on the long-distance trade route from Strasbourg to Ulm (the so-called Oppenauer Steige) as a result of the climb from Oppenau up to the Kniebis pass. This trading route (also called the Swabian Way or Schwabenweg) was controlled in Hohenstaufen times by the House of Zähringen. Later, it formed an important link between Württemberg and the Württemberg estates in present-day France. In times of war, for example during the Thirty Years' War it was also used for troop movements.

After the end of Hohenstaufen rule around 1250 the boundary between the lands of the Principality of Fürstenberg in the Kinzig valley and Central Black Forest (which went to the Grand Duchy of Baden in 1806) m Kniebis ) and the Duchy, later Kingdom, of Württemberg.

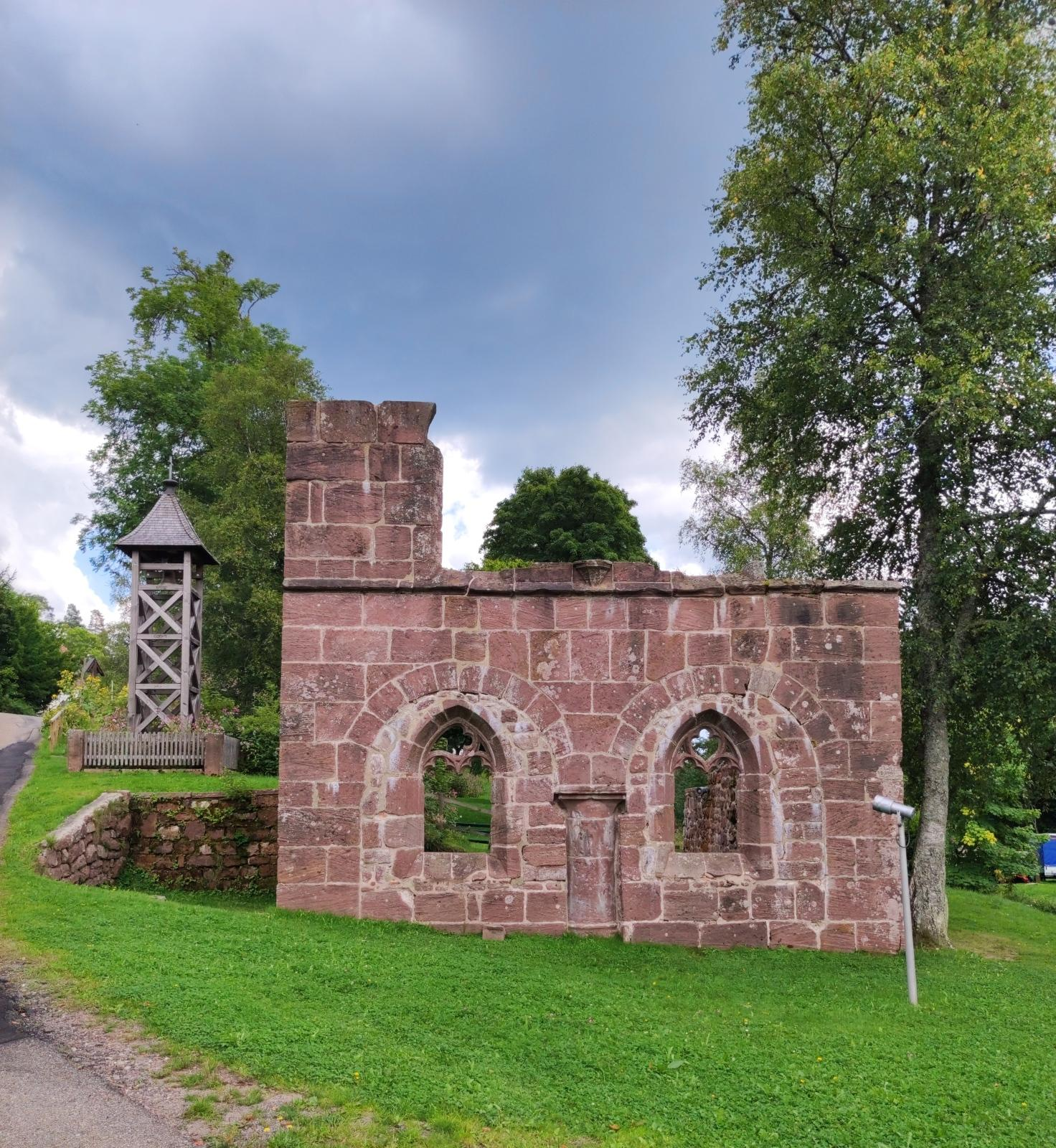
The old Kniebis Abbey

In 1267 in Kniebis village (Württemberg Kniebis) Kniebis Abbey was founded. It was dissolved in 1534 in the Reformation.

The pass over the Kniebis was already very important early on as a trade route between the Rhine valley and Württemberg. In the Middle Ages it also became strategically important from a military perspective. As a result, several fortifications were built in the area of the Kniebis and to the north on the Black Forest High Road.

- In 1632, a fortification called the Kleine Schanze or Alte Schanze was built on the summit of the mountain at the exit to the village between boundary stones 52 and 53 on the road leading to the pass in order to control it. There are no visible remains left, but an information board by the road indicates where it was.
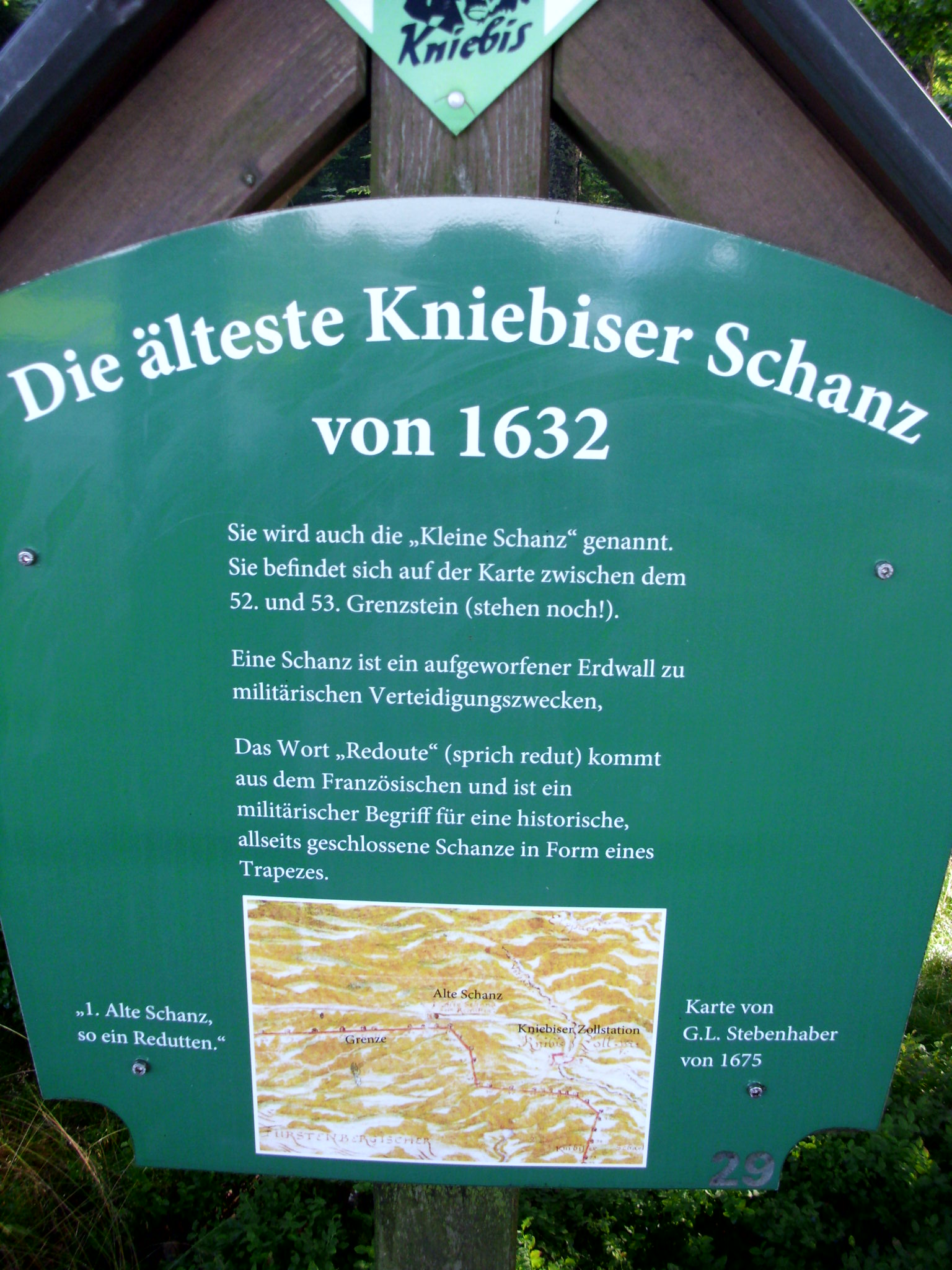
  Site of the old Kleine Schanze at the Kniebis
- About 1 km northwest of it on the Black Forest High Road (B 500) is another fortification, the Alexanderschanze. On a map by Stäbenhaber (Note: Georg Ludwig Stäbenhaber was born in 1640 in Hetzlinshofen. From 1668 he worked under a master builder, Weiß, on the fortress in Freudenstadt as assistant and inspector. His most important work is, however, the map of the Freudenstadt Forest of 1675. Due to the high accuracy of the cartography, the map is now a valuable historical document.) from the year 1674 it is already described as "repaired", so it must be older than that date.
- A further 3 kilometres further along the Black Forest High Road near the turn off to Oppenau is the Schwedenschanze ("Swedish Schanze) which was first mentioned in 1593.
- In the immediate vicinity of the Schwedenschanze is the Röschenschanze, built in 1794 by Major Rösch and named after him.

The Kleine Schanz(1), the Alexanderschanze(2) and the Schwedenschanze(3) are all marked on the section of the map by Stäbenhaber.

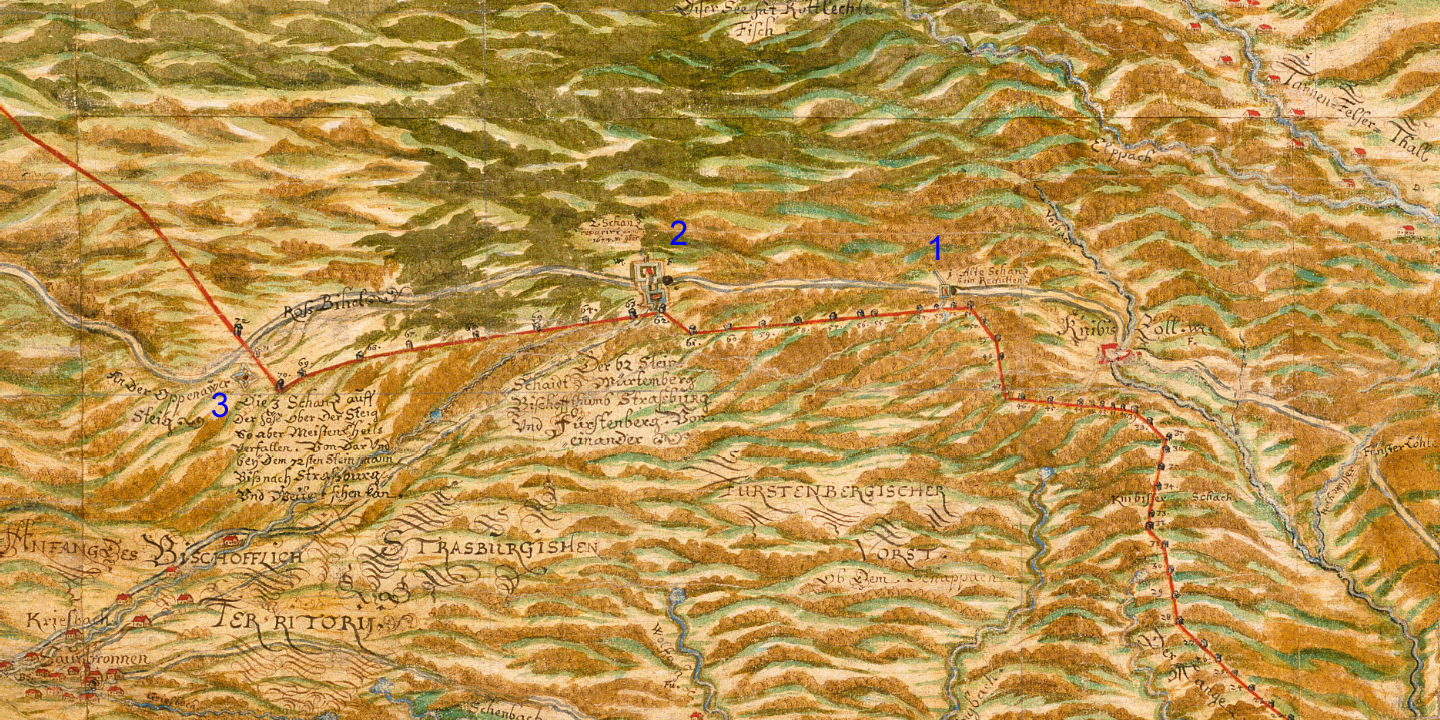
Section of the map by Georg Ludwig Stäbenhaber

From 1939 (start of construction) to 1945 (demolition by the German Wehrmacht) there was one of Hitler's Führer Headquarters here, the Tannenberg, which he used briefly in 1940. From July to the end of 1941 Gestapo prisoners from the forced labour camp (AEL) of Kniebis-Ruhestein built a section of the Black Forest High Road on the Kniebis. Both sites belong to the municipality of Baiersbronn, which extends from the new boundaries of the borough of Freudenstadt only on a part of the areas in the south, on which there are residential house and the Alexanderschanze.

From earliest days the Kniebis consisted of 3 parts, the Baiersbronn part, the Freudenstadt part (together forming the Württemberg Kniebis) and the Bad Rippoldsau part that belonged to Baden. The boundary is still marked today by boundary stones along the "Border Way" (Grenzweg). As a result of its division between two states an "inner Alemannic" dialect has developed between the Swabian (North Alemannic) speaking area and the Upper Rhenish, Lower Alemannic area.

In 1975 all three districts were incorporated into Freudenstadt.

== Gallery ==
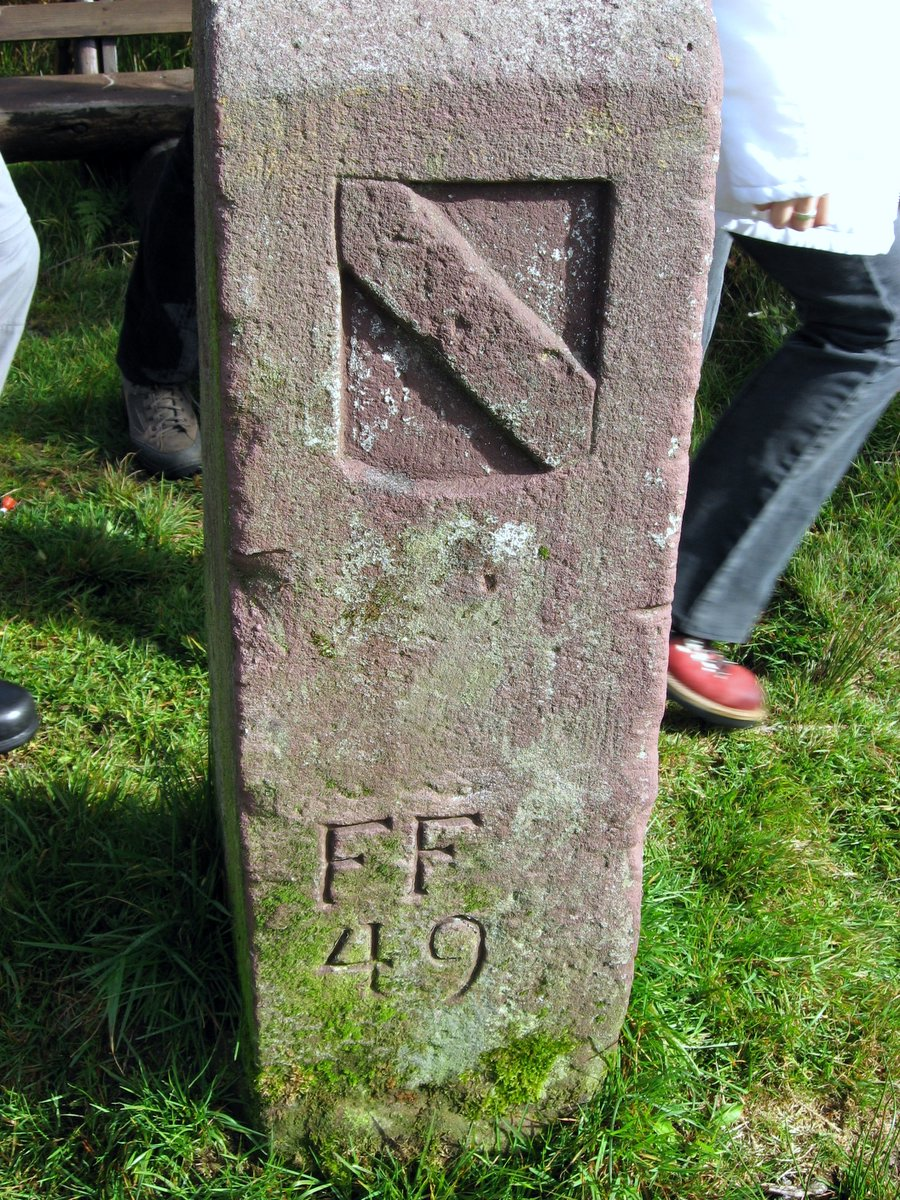
Baden side of a boundary stone on the Border Way (Grenzweg)

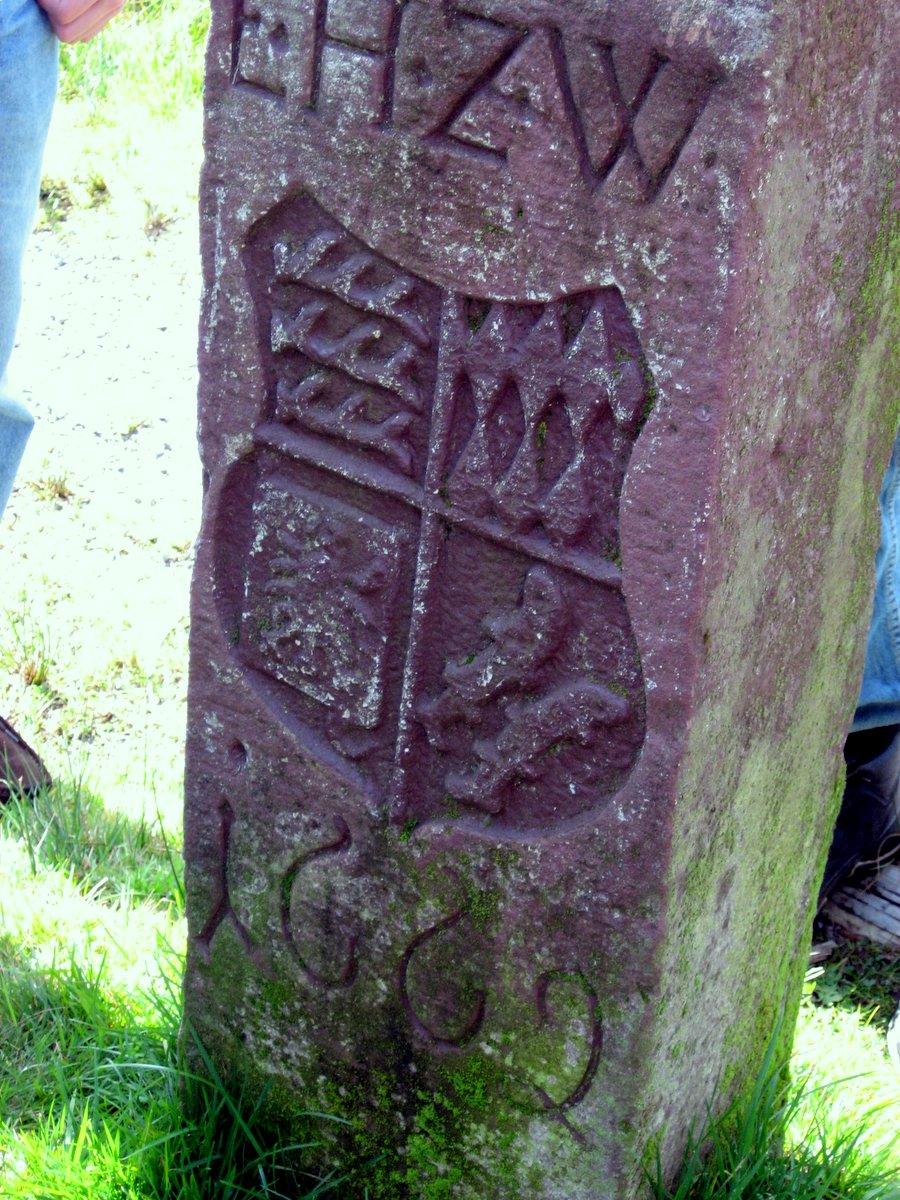
Württemberg face of a boundary stone on the Grenzweg

== Literature ==
- Louise Pichler, Die Ansiedler im Schwarzwald. Verlag Otto Risch, Stuttgart um 1890. (Erzählungen für die Jugend und das Volk, Vol. 15, 2nd ed.)
- Ralf Bernd Herden:Der Hofstaat des Führerhauptquartiers (auf dem Kniebis). In: Die Ortenau, 93. Jahresband 2013, pp. 443–452
- Ralf Bernd Herden: Das „Führerhauptquartier Tannenberg“ auf dem Kniebis. In: Martin Ruch (ed.): Die Ortenau. Veröffentlichungen des Historischen Vereins für Mittelbaden. 82. Jahresband 2002, Bühl 2002, pp. 681–684.
- Adolf J. Schmid: Der Kniebis und seine katholische Kirche St. Josef : 1899–1999. Schillinger, Freiburg im Breisgau, 1999, ISBN 3-89155-243-2.
