= Ruhestein =

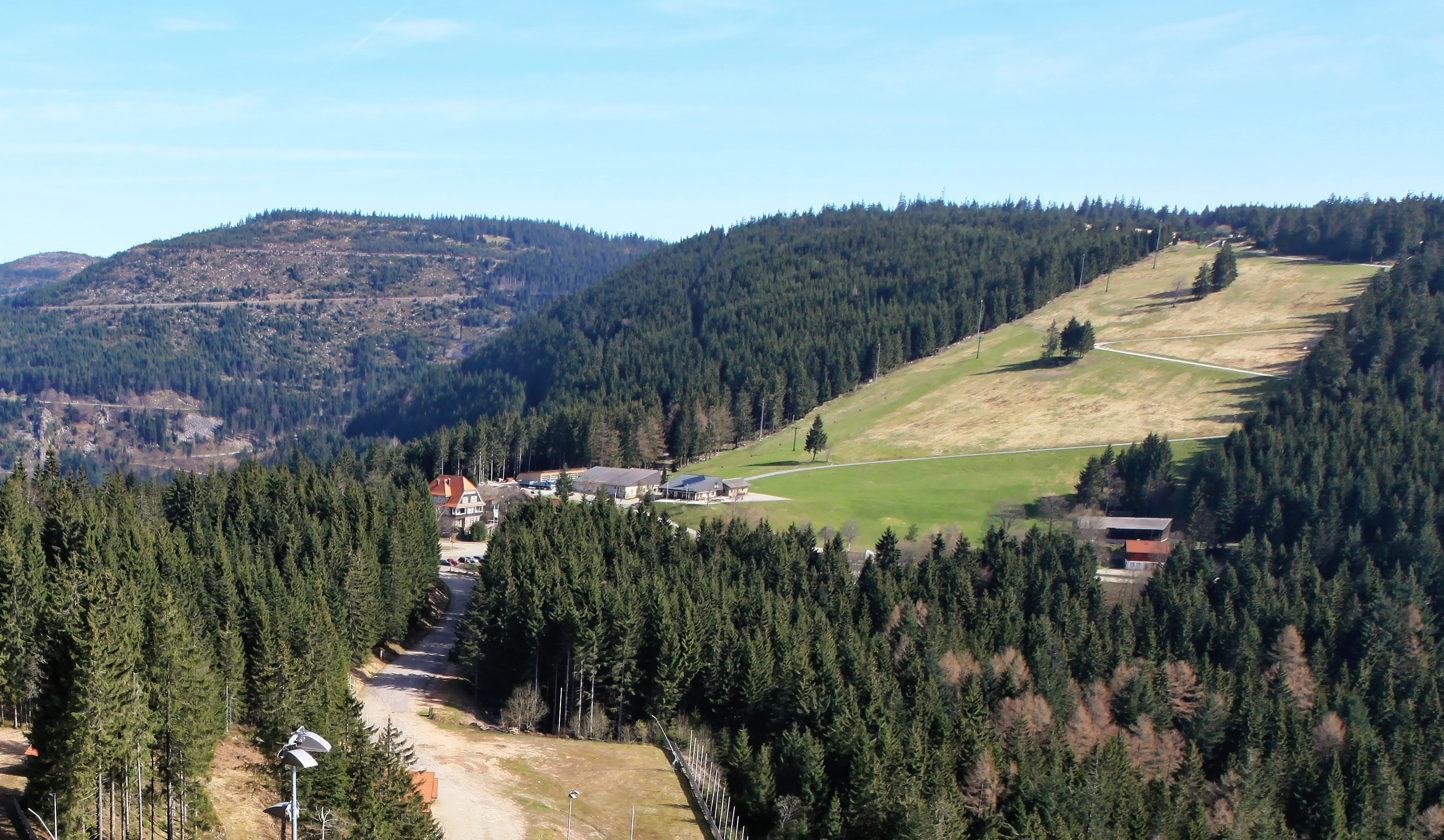
- Ruhestein
- Interactive map of Ruhestein
- Elevation: 915DE-NN

Location
- Location: Baden-Württemberg
- Range: Black Forest
- Coordinates: 48°33′40″N 8°13′17″E

The Ruhestein is a mountain pass (915 m above NN) between the Murg valley and the Acher valley in the Northern Black Forest, Germany. The border between the old Grand Duchy of Baden and the Kingdom of Württemberg ran over the pass, a large sandstone erratic marking the former border. Today it forms the provincial, county and municipal boundary between Baiersbronn (county of Freudenstadt) and Seebach (Ortenaukreis). The Ruhestein is a rest area for all those who want to cross the mountain ridge from one valley to the other.

Ruhestein lies on the Black Forest High Road, which links Baden-Baden and Freudenstadt. It is a popular day trip and recreation destination and a well known winter sports resort with ski lifts on the Ruhesteinberg, ski jumps (Große Ruhesteinschanze) and loipes. The winding road between Baiersbronn-Obertal and the Ruhestein was used once, on 21 July 1946, for a mountain motor race, the Bergrennen Obertal-Ruhestein, during which 3 participants lost their lives.

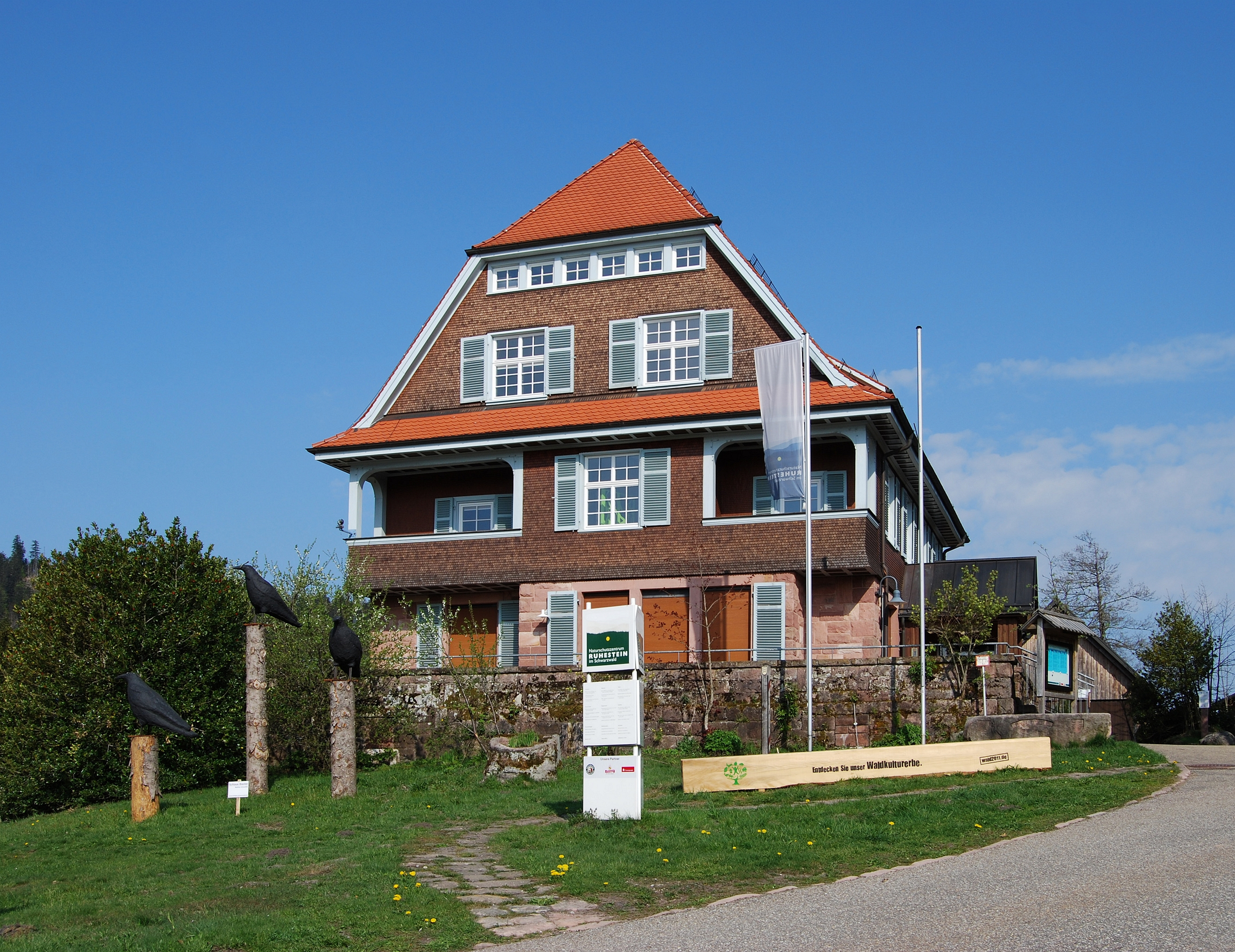
Ruhestein Nature Conservation Station

Around Ruhestein lies one of the two parts of the Black Forest National Park which was opened on 1 January 2014. The Ruhestein Nature Conservation Centre at the top of the pass has exhibitions and events about conservation. In addition, the head office of the national park and the Central/North Black Forest Nature Park are based here. The so-called Lothar Path on the Schliffkopf mountain was laid on an area of windthrow following the passage of Hurricane Lothar on 26 December 1999. Visitors are led along an 800-metre-long educational and experience trail, which takes them over steps, bridges and boardwalks through the 10 hectares of devastated forest, and enables them to observe how the forces of nature operate and how such areas recover naturally after storm devastation. West of Ruhestein the only klettersteig in the Northern Black Forest runs up the Karlsruher Grat.

== Literature ==
- Frank Eberle, Hubert Huber, Roger Orlik, Martin Walter: Ruhestein-Bergrennen 1946. Der Neubeginn des deutschen Motorsports. SP-Verlag, Albstadt, 2011, ISBN 978-3-9812106-0-6.
