= Lothar Path =

Coordinates: 48.505961°N 08.222296°E

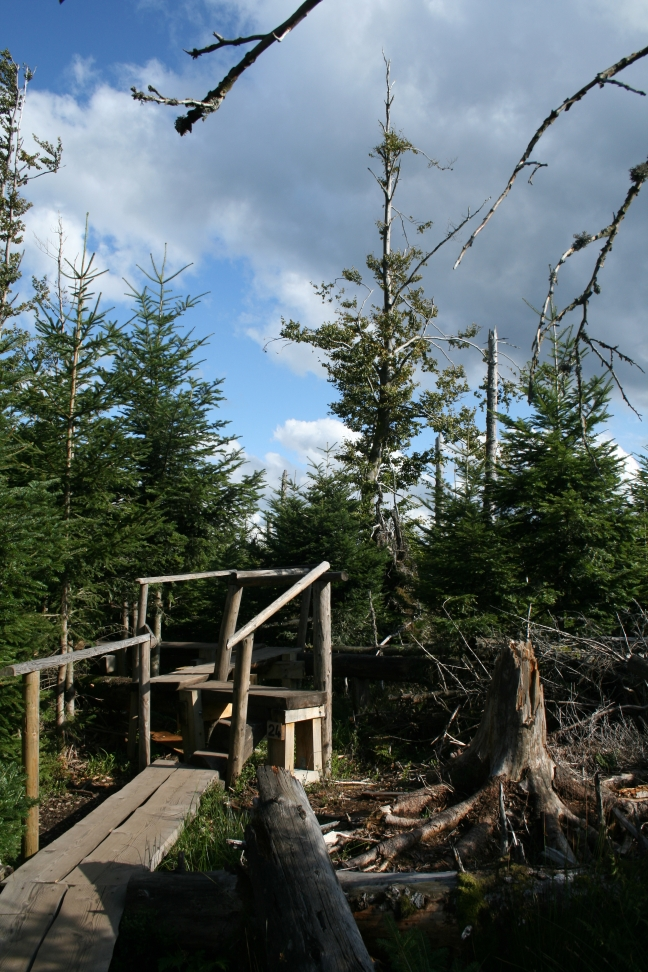
Footbridge over a fallen tree between young firs

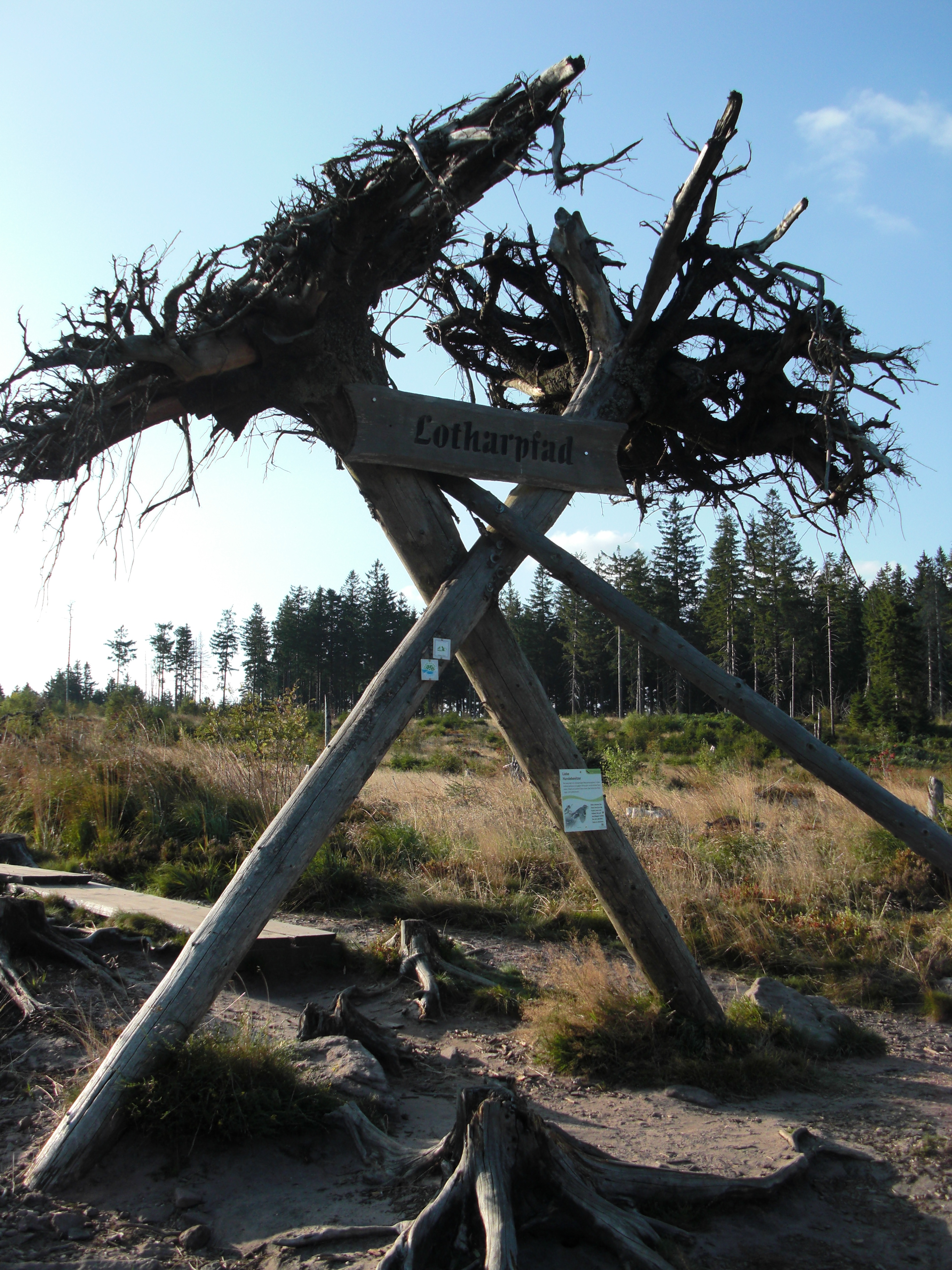
Entrance to the Lothar Path

The Lothar Path (German: Lotharpfad) is a forest experience and educational path in the Schliffkopf Nature Reserve by the Black Forest High Road between Oppenau and Baiersbronn on the B 500 in the Northern Black Forest. The name of the windthrow educational trail is derived from Hurricane Lothar, which tore through the forest here on 26 December 1999 with wind velocities of up to 200 km/h creating a wide swathe of debris.

After mountain pastures became increasingly uncultivated as a result of the housing of livestock and the abandonment of haymaking, the plateaux of the Northern Black Forest were initially reforested, predominantly with spruce, whose roots could not penetrate the bunter sandstone soil to any great depth. As a result, when the storm hit the state of Baden-Württemberg, around 30 million cubic metres of wood was torn from the ground within the space of two hours.

After the storm, conservation and forest managers decided to leave the 10-hectare windthrow area of the Lothar Path to recover unaided as an area of protected forest or Bannwald, in order to be able to observe the long-term, natural regeneration of the habitat. The project was entrusted to the Black Forest National Park.

In June 2003, as part of the EU-sponsored Grinde Black Forest project, an 800-metre-long educational and discovery path was constructed by the Black Forest High Road (B 500) between Ruhestein and Kniebis-Alexanderschanze. The path runs along steps, bridges and footbridges made from the dead wood, over and under the fallen trees. An observation platform offers views over Braunberg, Lierbach, Oppenau, Strasbourg and the Vosges; in clear weather, the Feldberg, the Kaiserstuhl and the Alps may be seen.

In 2007 it was recorded that nearly 50,000 visitors came to the Lothar Path annually.

== Literature ==
- Regierungspräsidium Karlsruhe (publ.): Sturmwurf-Erlebnis auf dem Lotharpfad. 3rd edition. Karlsruhe, 2005.
