= Falkenfelsen =

Rock formation in Germany

Coordinates: 48°40′11″N 8°13′25″E

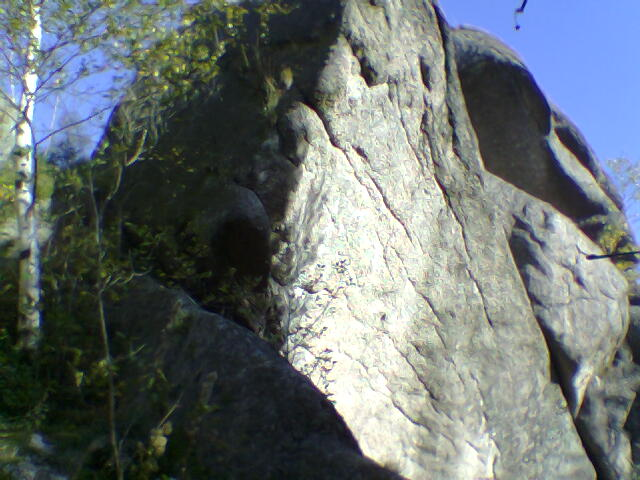
Falkenfelsen

The Falkenfelsen (German pronunciation: [ˈfalkn̩ˌfɛlzn̩], lit. 'Falcon Rock') is a granite rock formation in the Northern Black Forest of Germany's Baden-Württemberg state. One side of the formation is a cliff about 200 feet (61 m) high. From the Schwarzwaldhochstrasse (Black Forest Highway), two hiking trails lead through the formation and end at the shelter Herta-hut. The platform has a view over the northern Black Forest, with the Hornisgrinde in the south, Bühlerhöhe in the northeast and the valley of the Upper Rhine on the west.
