= Schwarzwaldhochstraße =

Scenic route in Germany

Coordinates: 48.65335°N 8.23275°E

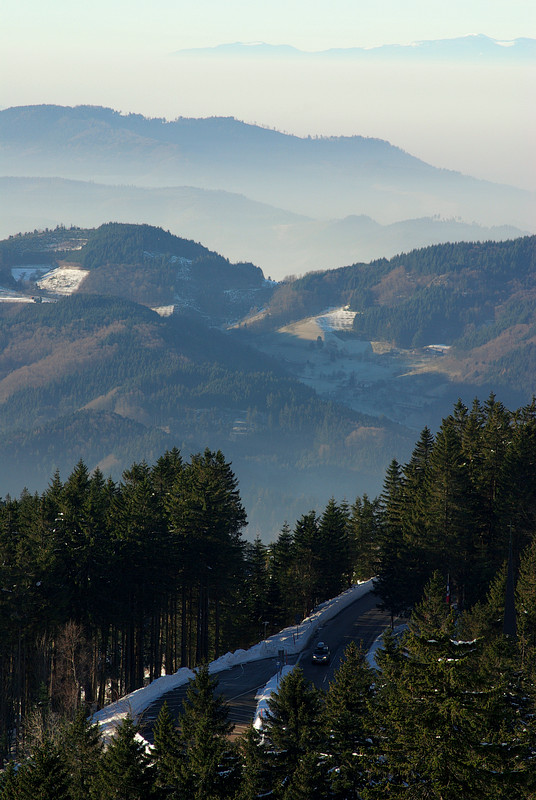
The Schwarzwaldhochstraße on the Mummelsee. The Vosges visible on the horizon over the fog-filled Rhine valley.

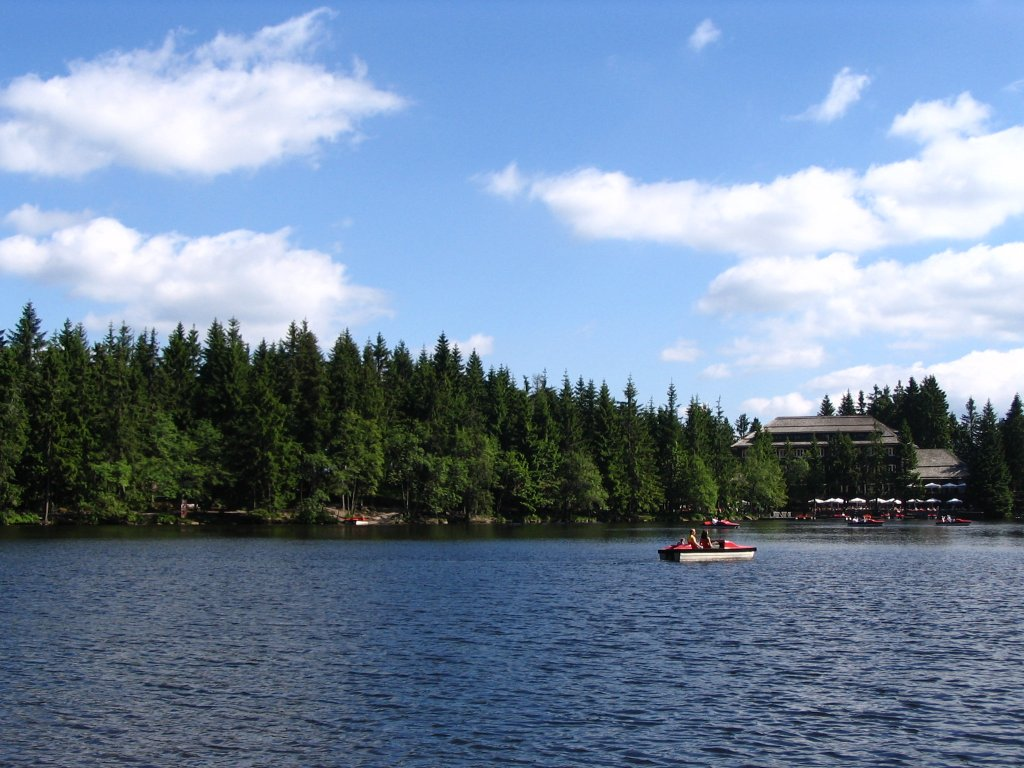
The Mummelsee

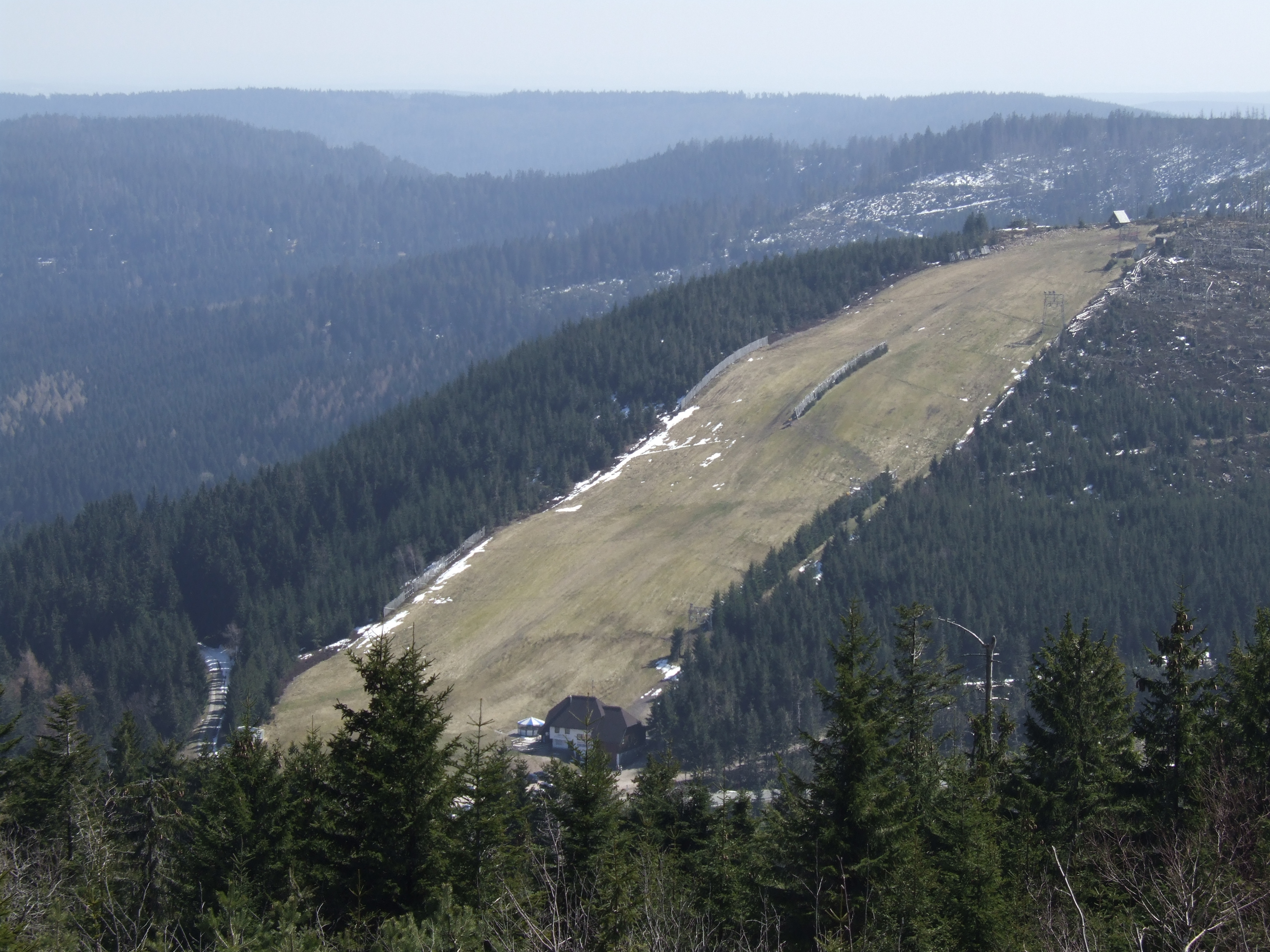
The ski slope Seibelseckle between Mummelsee and Ruhestein.

The Schwarzwaldhochstraße or Black Forest High Road is the oldest and one of the best known themed drives in Germany. It is a part of the B 500 federal highway and leads over 60 km from Baden-Baden to Freudenstadt.

== Route description ==
The Schwarzwaldhochstraße begins in Baden-Baden and rises quickly to the main ridge of the northern Black Forest, reaching the top at the Bühlerhöhe. At the top is a luxury hotel, also named "Bühlerhöhe". A small chapel with notable stained glass windows, known locally as the Adenau Church (Adenauerkirche), sits perched on an outcrop on the heights. When the weather is clear, there is a wide view over the Rhine plain toward the Vosges.

From the Bühlerhöhe, the Hochstraße runs at an altitude of between 800 and 1,000 metres above sea level past several highland hotels (Plättig, Sand, Hundseck, Unterstmatt, Mummelsee, Ruhestein, Schliffkopf). At one of the several ski areas along the route, on the Mehliskopf near Sand, is a year-round, all-weather bob track. Here is also where the road branches off to the Schwarzenbach Dam and the Herrenwies Nordic ski centre.

Other ski lifts and restaurants can be found at Hundseck and Unterstmatt.

Passing below the highest mountain in the northern Black Forest, the 1,164-metre-high Hornisgrinde, the road reaches the almost circular Mummelsee, a cirque from the latest ice age.

The Naturschutzzentrum (Nature Conservation Centre) at Ruhestein has information about the Central and Northern Black Forest Nature Park, one of a series of nature parks throughout Germany that aim to protect natural and cultural features of an area. The information centre is also responsible for the Lothar Path, an interpretive trail showing the effects of the 1999 storm Lothar. In addition to ski lifts and cross-country trails, Ruhestein has a ski jump.

The road then continues over the Schliffkopf and Kniebis ranges, past Zuflucht and the Alexanderschanze to end in the town of Freudenstadt.

== History ==
The name Schwarzwaldhochstraße was first used in 1930 after the completion of the section of road between Hundseck and Untersmatt made access to the High Black Forest easier. In order to draw the growing number of tourist cars to the highland hotels, the roads in the high valleys were collectively named as a holiday route. Under the Third Reich, further construction was done for strategic reasons, including finishing the uncompleted stretch between Ruhestein and Alexanderschanze through a nature reserve between 1938 and 1941. The entire route from Baden-Baden to Freudenstadt was completed in 1952.

== Literature ==
- Ernst Kafka, Wolfgang Schlund: Die Schwarzwaldhochstraße – Geschichte und Geschichten. PK-Verlag, Freiamt 2007, ISBN 978-3-9810385-1-4.
- Roland Seiter: Erlebnis Schwarzwaldhochstraße … zu Großvaters Zeiten … anhand historischer Ansichtskarten. Verlag Regionalkultur, Ubstadt-Weiher 2018, ISBN 978-3-95505-087-0.

== See also ==
- Castle Road, themed route in Bavaria and Baden-Württemberg
- Falkenfelsen, or Falcon Rock, in Baden-Württemberg
- German Wine Route, in the Palatinate region
- Romantic Road, a holiday route in Bavaria and Baden-Württemberg
