= Igelsberg =

- Part of Freudenstadt
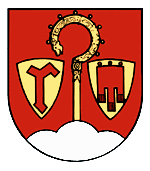
- Coat of arms
- Interactive map of Igelsberg
- Location within Germany Location within Baden-Württemberg
- Coordinates: 48.539°N 08.4409°E
- Country: Germany
- State: Baden-Württemberg
- Town: Freudenstadt
- Elevation: 730–780 m (2,400–2,560 ft)

Population (2008)
  - Total: 259
- Time zone: UTC+01:00 (CET)
  - Summer (DST): UTC+02:00 (CEST)
- Postal codes: 72250
- Dialling codes: 07442

Igelsberg is a village in the town of Freudenstadt in the Black Forest in Germany.

The settlement was built in a clearing first recorded around 1230 as Illigsberg. Count Palatine Rudolf of Tübingen assigned the place to the Prince-Bishopric of Strasbourg as a fiefdom. From 1381, Igelsberg belonged to the administrative office or Klosteramt of Reichenbach and went with it in 1595 to the Duchy of Württemberg. In 1807, Igelsberg became part of the Oberamt of Freudenstadt. On 1 July 1971, Igelsberg was incorporated into Freudenstadt.

Igelsberg has almost 250 inhabitants and has an agricultural character. In particular The village has numerous guesthouses for spa and holiday guests and as well as a hotel, the Hotel Krone (built 1890) in the town centre. The nearby Nagold Reservoir is open to bathers and the managed forests in the area have hiking trails.

== Coat of arms ==
The former municipal coat of arms displays a golden abbot's staff on top of a silver tri-peak mountain on a red field. On either side of the staff are the coats of arms of Reichenbach Abbey (red r in Fraktur on a gold field) and the Counts Palatine of Tübingen (tripartite red flag on a gold field).

== Literature ==
- Paulus, Karl Eduard, ed. (1858). "Igelsberg" in Beschreibung des Oberamts Freudenstadt (= Die Württembergischen Oberamtsbeschreibungen 1824–1886. Vol. 38). Stuttgart: Karl Aue. pp. 258–260 (see [Wikisource]).
