= Christoph Friedrich von Stälin =

German librarian and historian

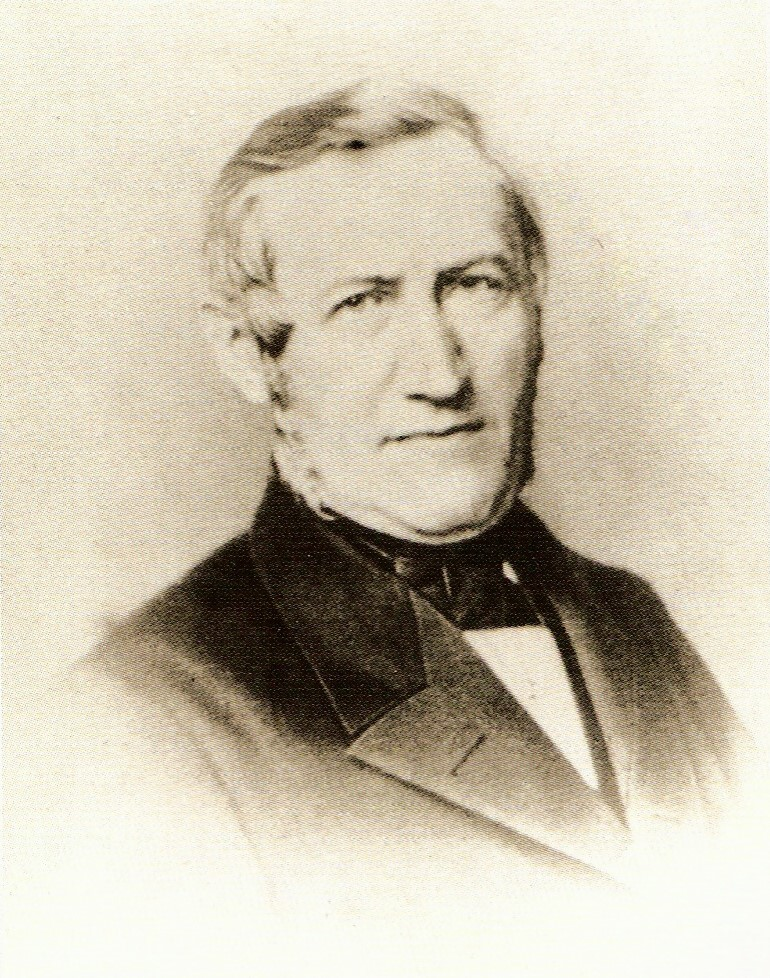
Christoph Friedrich von Stälin

Christoph Friedrich von Stälin (4 August 1805, in Calw – 12 August 1873, in Stuttgart) was a German librarian and historian. He was the father of archivist Paul Friedrich von Stälin (1840–1909).

From 1821 to 1825 he studied philosophy, theology and philology at the universities of Tübingen and Heidelberg, where Georg Friedrich Creuzer was an important influence to his career. Afterwards, he became a librarian at the Royal Library in Stuttgart, where in 1869 he was appointed as its director. With Georg Waitz and Ludwig Häusser, he was editor of the journal, Forschungen zur Deutschen Geschichte ("Research of German History").

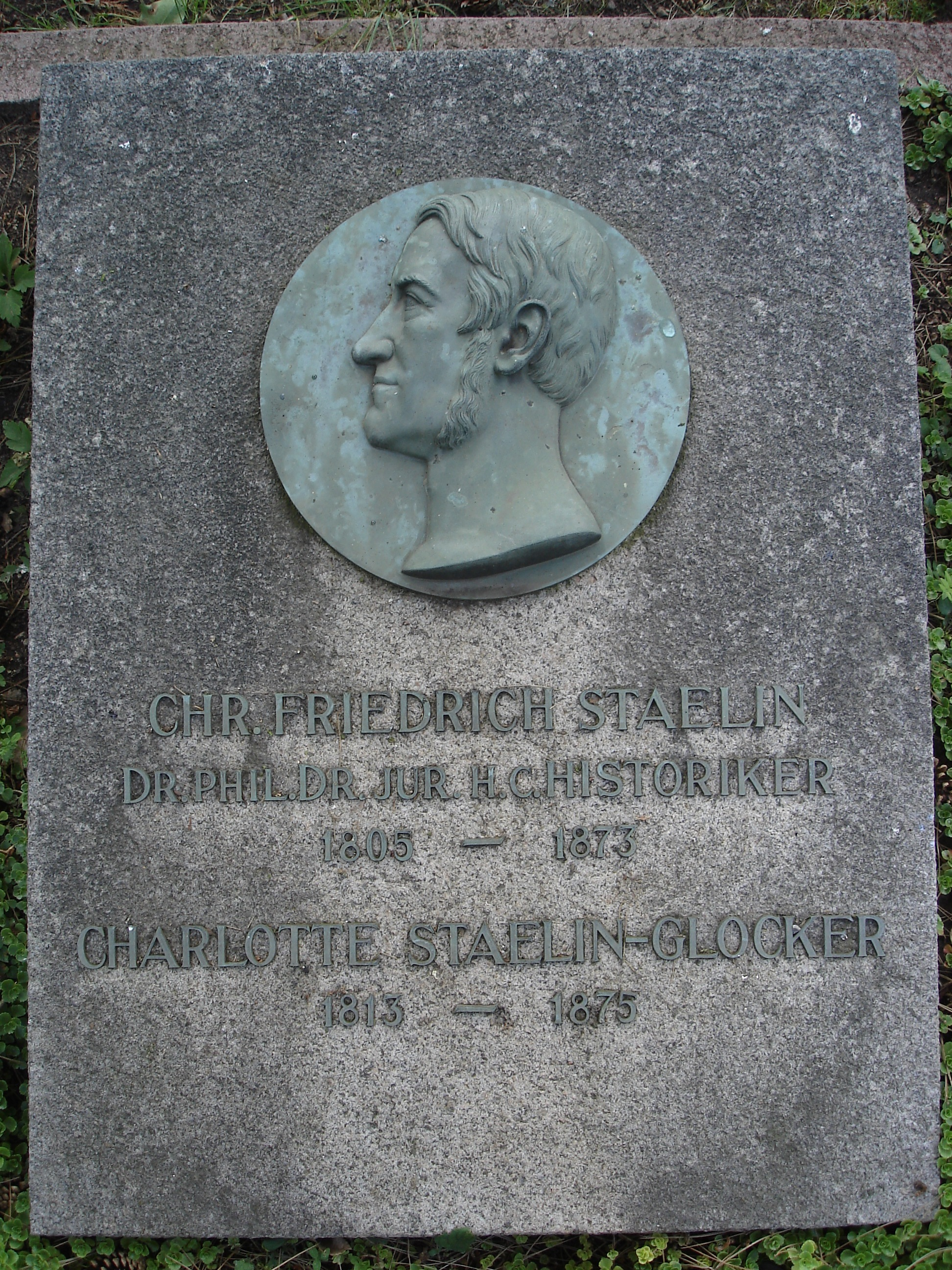
Grave marker of Stälin at the Pragfriedhof in Stuttgart

== Publications ==
His best written effort was a history of Württemberg, published in four parts from 1841 to 1873:

- Wirtembergische Geschichte.
  - Volume 1: Schwaben und Südfranken von der Urzeit bis 1080 (1841) – Swabia and southern Franconia from prehistoric times to 1080.
  - Volume 2: Schwaben und Südfranken : Hohenstaufenzeit; 1080 - 1268 (1847) – Swabia and southern Franconia: Hohenstaufen period; 1080–1268.
  - Volume 3: Schwaben und Südfranken : Schluss d. Mittelalters; 1269 - 1496 (1856) – Swabia and southern Franconia: Conclusion of the Middle Ages; 1269–1496.
  - Volume 4: Schwaben und Südfranken vornehmlich im 16. Jahrhundert : Zeit d. württ. Herzoge Eberhard II., Ulrich, Christoph, Ludwig; 1498 - 1593 (1873) – Swabia and southern Franconia, mainly in the 16th century. Era of the Württemberg dukes Eberhard II, Ulrich, Christoph, Ludwig; 1498–1593.
