= Röschenschanze =

Röschenschanze (Schwabenschanze)
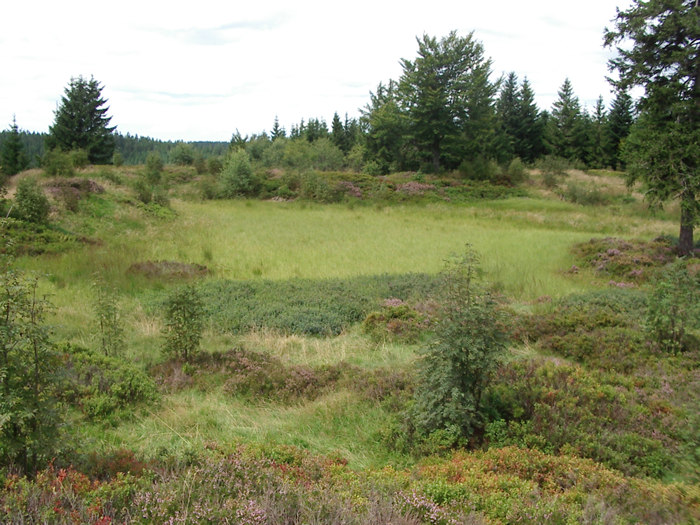
- Inside the Röschenschanze

Highest point
- Coordinates: 48°29′38″N 8°14′24″E

Geography
- Location within Germany
- Location: Baden-Württemberg, Germany

The Röschenschanze is a former schanze in Bad Peterstal-Griesbach in the Black Forest in Southern Germany.

It is located on the L 402, the "Oppenauer Steige", which branches off from the B 500 (Black Forest High Road). Another redoubt which is geographically close to the Röschenschanze is the Schwedenschanze (Zuflucht).

== Etymology ==
The schanze is named after the Württemberg Major Jakob Friedrich Rösch (1743–1841). Rösch became known in particular for his teaching activities at the military plant school and for the construction of the Röschenschanze.

The Röschenschanze is also known as Schwabenschanze (literally 'Swabian redoubt').

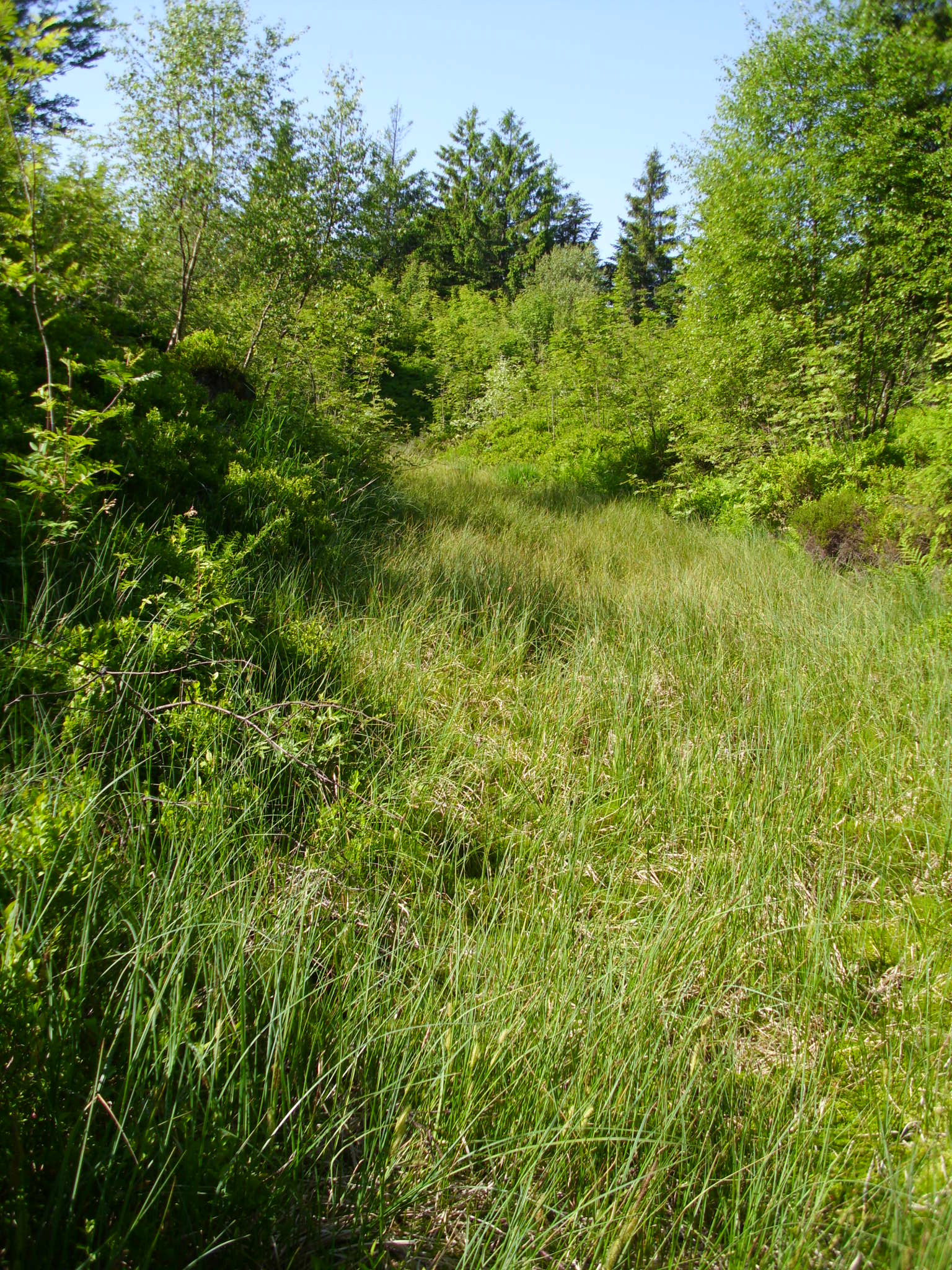
Outer ditch on the rampart of the Röschenschanze

== History ==
The Röschenschanze was created as part of the coalition wars of the German princes against France. It was supposed to stop the French troops coming from the Renchtal under General Moreau.

In 1794, Rösch was entrusted with the construction of a hexagonal star-shaped schanze with six bulwarks to defend the Württemberg state border. The Röschenschanze consisted of star-shaped piled earth walls behind which the defenders camped.

At the time when it was not completely finished, a local farmer's boy led the French troops over the Oppenauer Steige to the Röschenschanze, so that it was stormed by Napoleon's troops in 1796 and taken almost without a fight.

== See also ==
- Redoubt
- Schanze
- Schwedenschanze (Zuflucht)
