= Bad Peterstal-Griesbach =

- Municipality
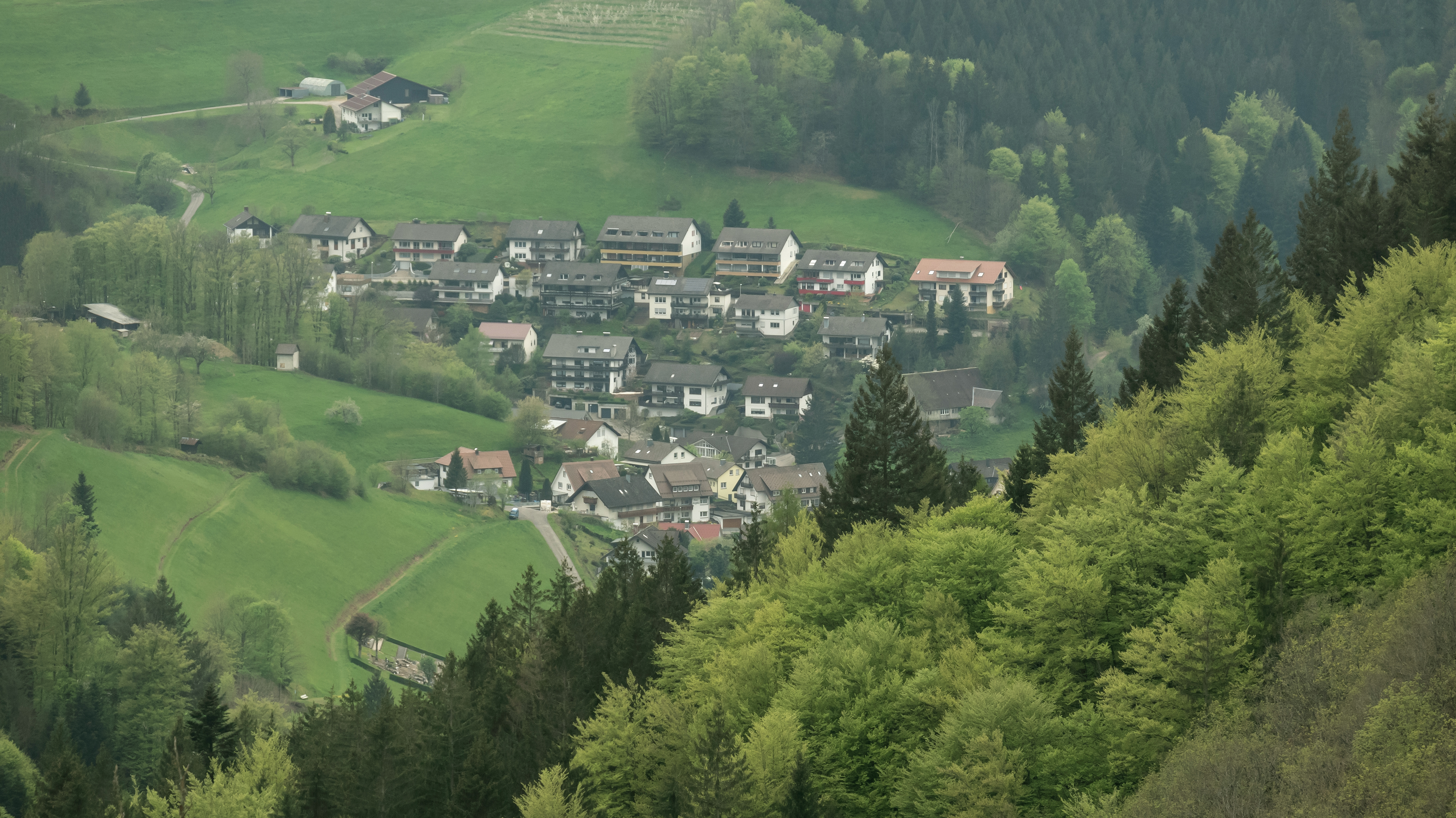
- View to the village from the mountains

- Coat of arms

- Location of Bad Peterstal-Griesbach within Ortenaukreis district
- Interactive map of Bad Peterstal-Griesbach
- Location within Germany Location within Baden-Württemberg
- Coordinates: 48°25′44″N 08°12′19″E
- Country: Germany
- State: Baden-Württemberg
- Admin. region: Freiburg
- District: Ortenaukreis

Government
  - Mayor (2018–26): Meinrad Baumann (Ind.)

Area
  - Total: 41.2 km^{2} (15.9 sq mi)
- Elevation: 393 m (1,289 ft)

Population (2025-12-31)
  - Total: 2,581
  - Density: 62.6/km^{2} (162/sq mi)
- Time zone: UTC+01:00 (CET)
  - Summer (DST): UTC+02:00 (CEST)
- Postal codes: 77740, 72250 (Zuflucht)
- Dialling codes: 07806
- Vehicle registration: OG, BH, KEL, LR, WOL
- Website: gemeinde.bad-peterstal-griesbach.de

Bad Peterstal-Griesbach (German pronunciation: [baːt ˈpeːtɐstaːl ˈɡʁiːsbax]; Low Alemannic: Bad Petersdal-Griesbach) is a municipality in the district of Ortenau in Baden-Württemberg in Germany.

Matthias Erzberger was murdered here on August 26, 1921, for signing the 1918 Armistice for the German Empire.

Two former military fortifications are located in Zuflucht, a village in Bad Peterstal-Griesbach: the Schwedenschanze (Zuflucht) and the Röschenschanze. They are two of the many military protection forces in the history of the Black Forest, which were created since the Thirty Years' War (1618–1648) mainly to repel French troops.

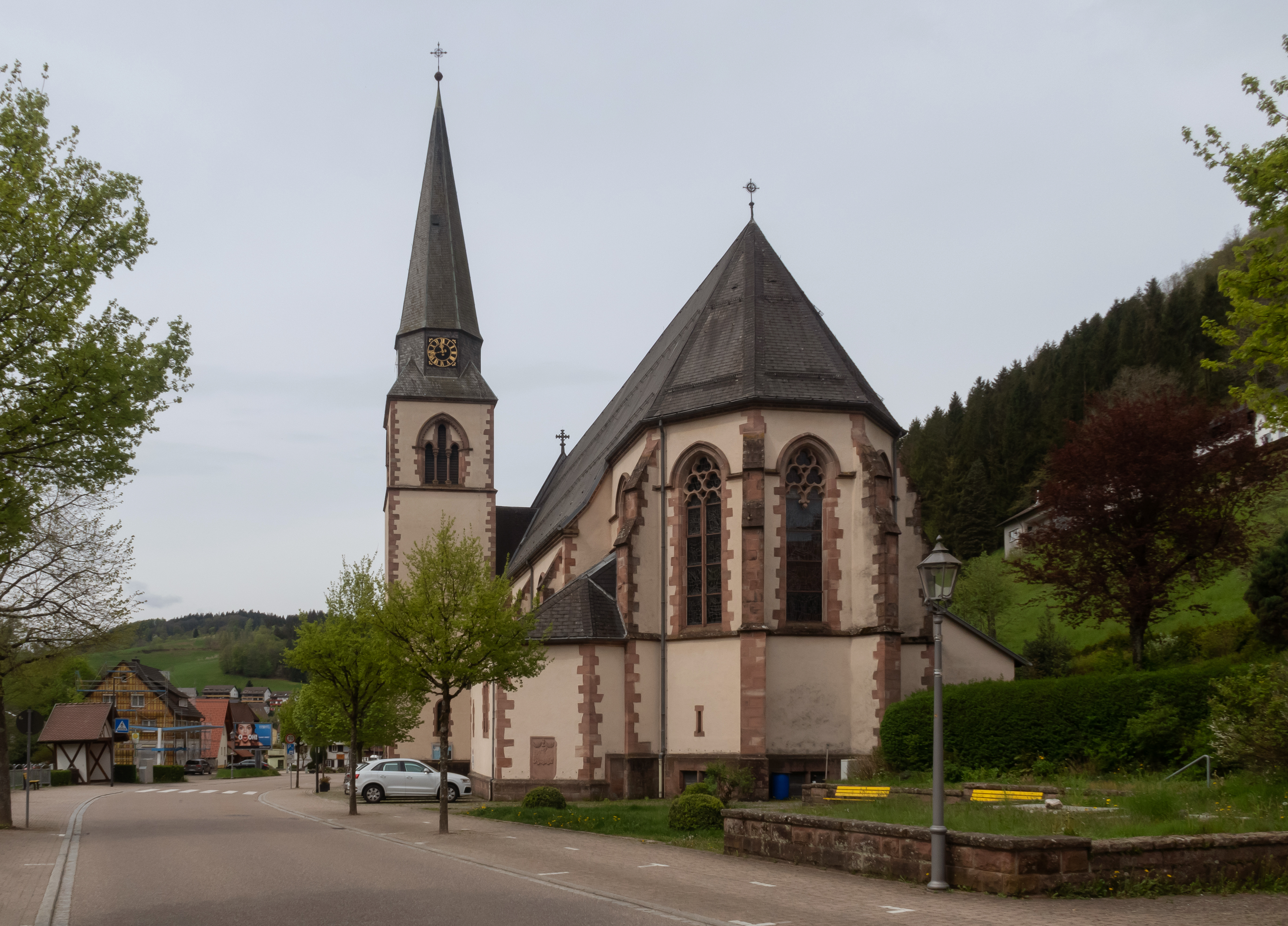
Bad Griesbach, church: Antoniuskirche

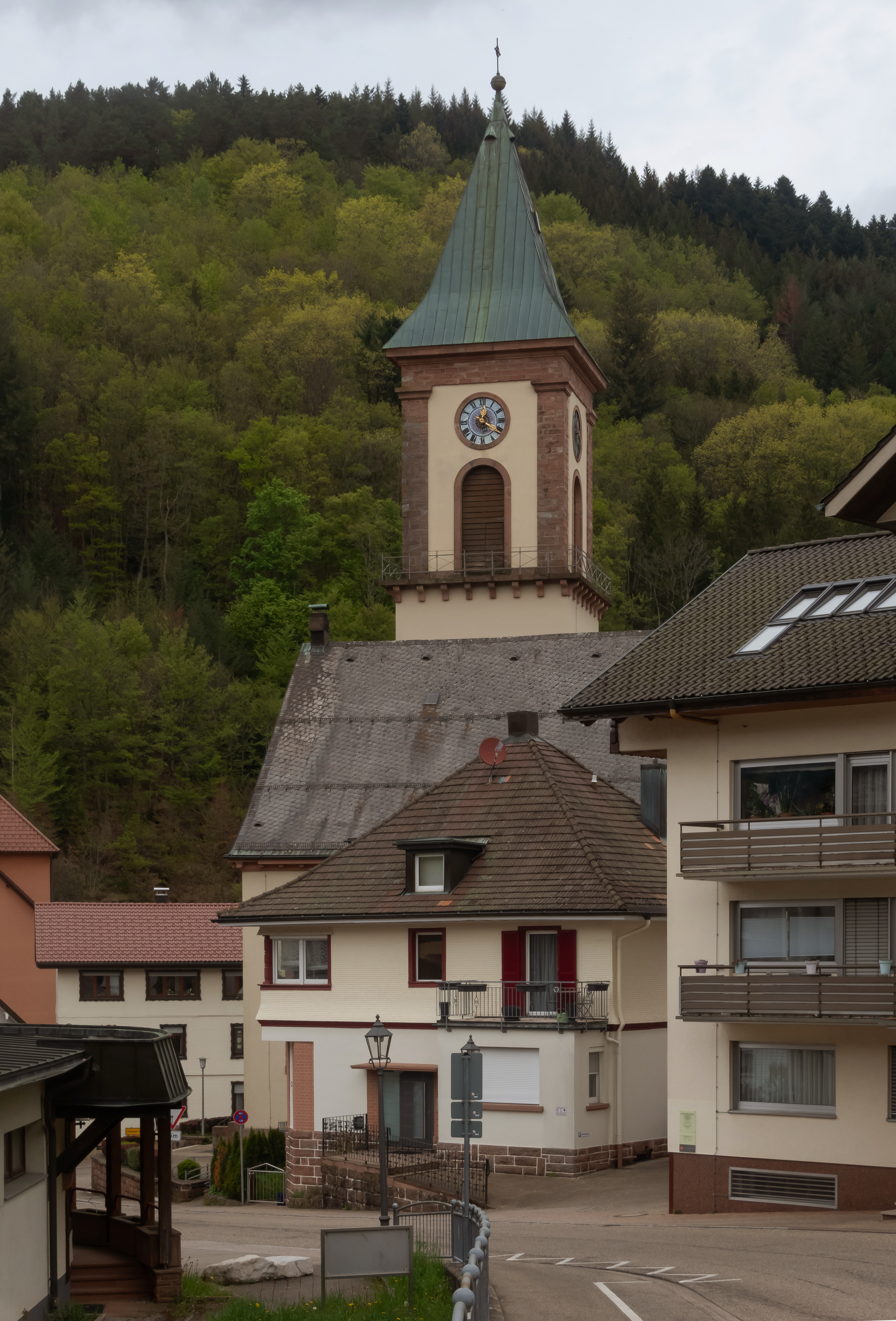
Bad Peterstal, churchtower (Kirche Sankt Peter und Paul)

== See also ==
- Black Forest
