= Schwedenschanze (Zuflucht) =

Former schanze in Bad Peterstal-Griesbach in the Black Forest in Southern Germany

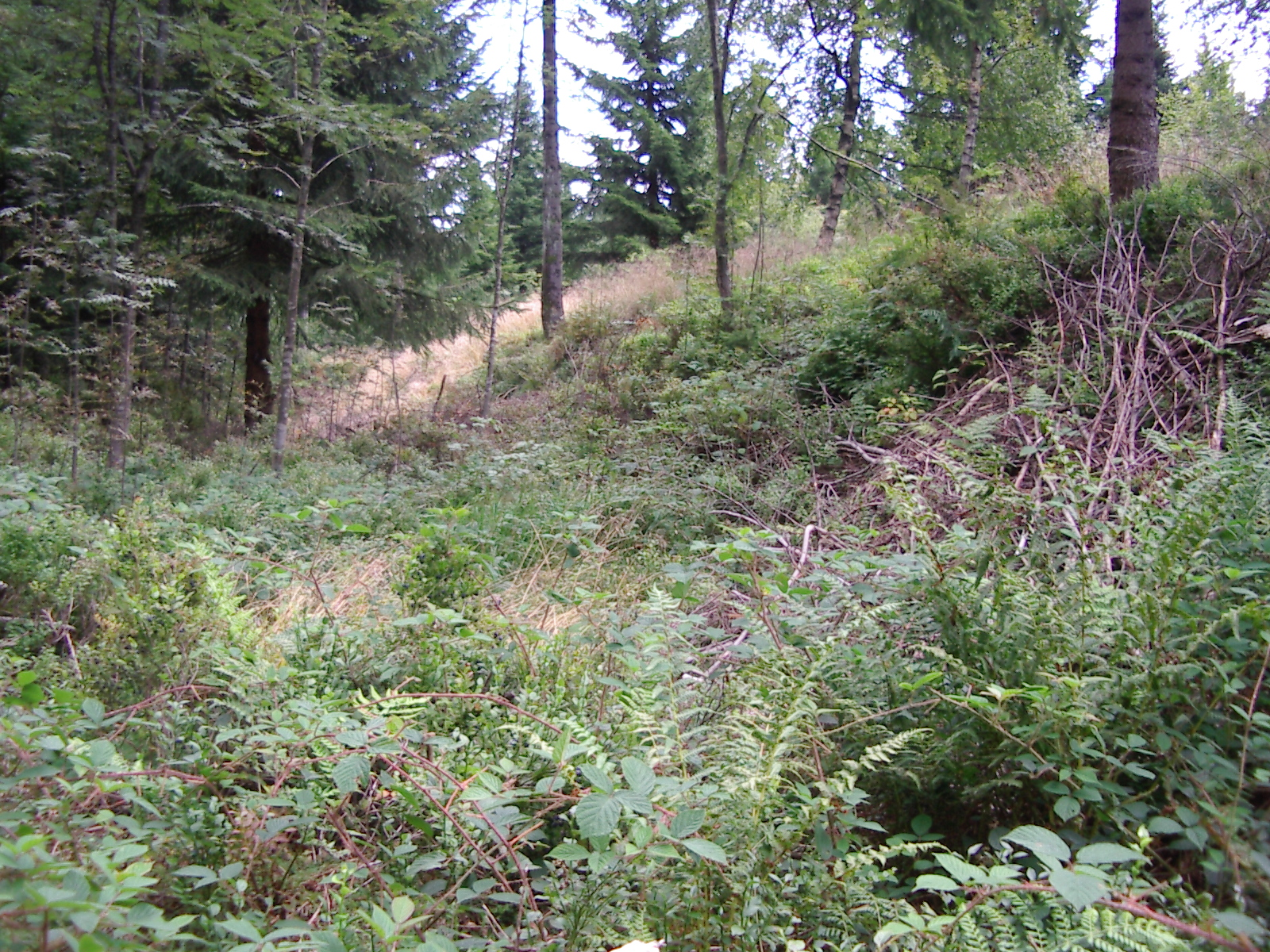
- The Schwedenschanze's circumferential ditch

Highest point
- Coordinates: 48°29′24″N 8°14′34″E

Geography
- Location: Baden-Württemberg, Germany

The Schwedenschanze (Zuflucht) is a former schanze in Bad Peterstal-Griesbach in the Black Forest in Southern Germany.

It is located on the L 402, the "Oppenauer Steige", which branches off from the B 500 (Black Forest High Road). Another redoubt which is geographically close to the Schwedenschanze is the Röschenschanze.

== Etymology ==
The name Schwedenschanze (literally 'Swedish redoubt') dates back to Swedish troops as erectors. Many redoubts from this time carry this name. Zuflucht is a village which belongs to the municipality Bad Peterstal-Griesbach.

== History ==
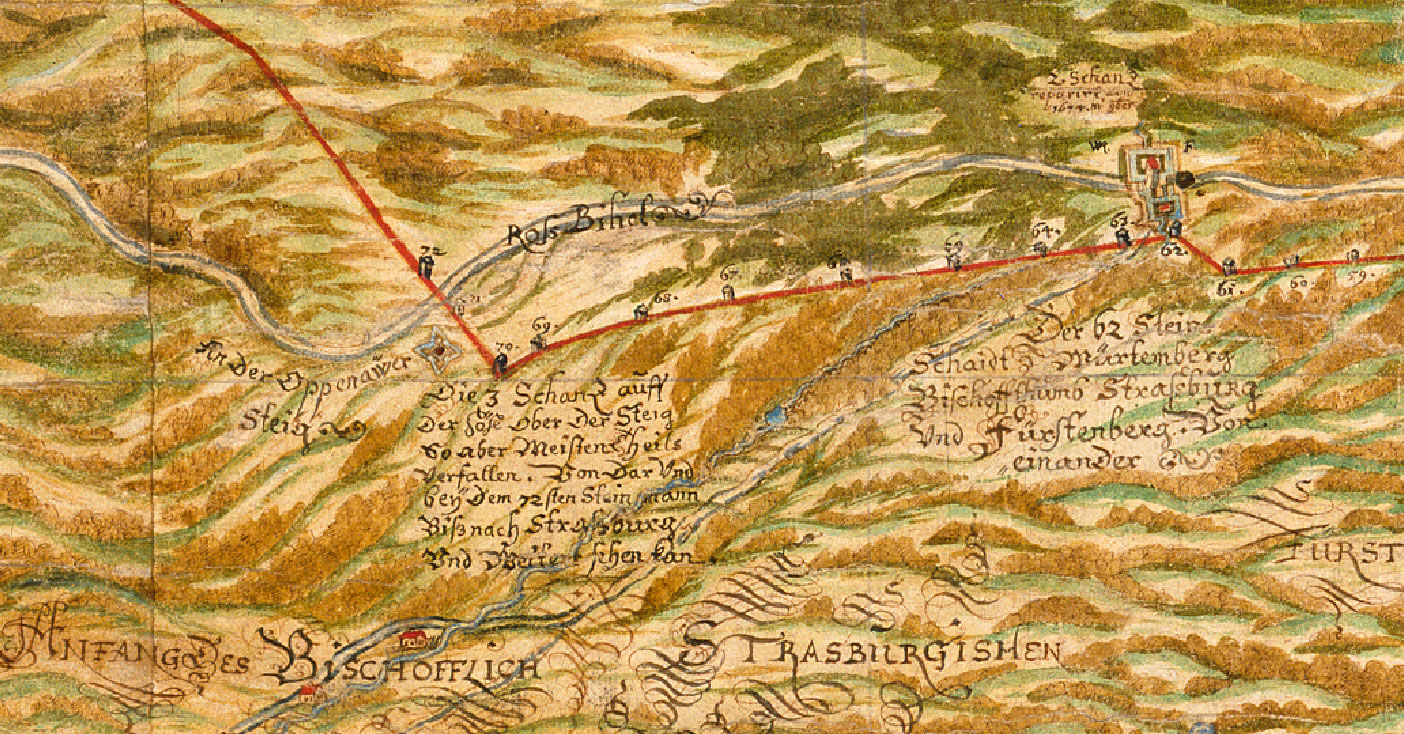
Detail from the map by Georg Ludwig Stäbenhaber

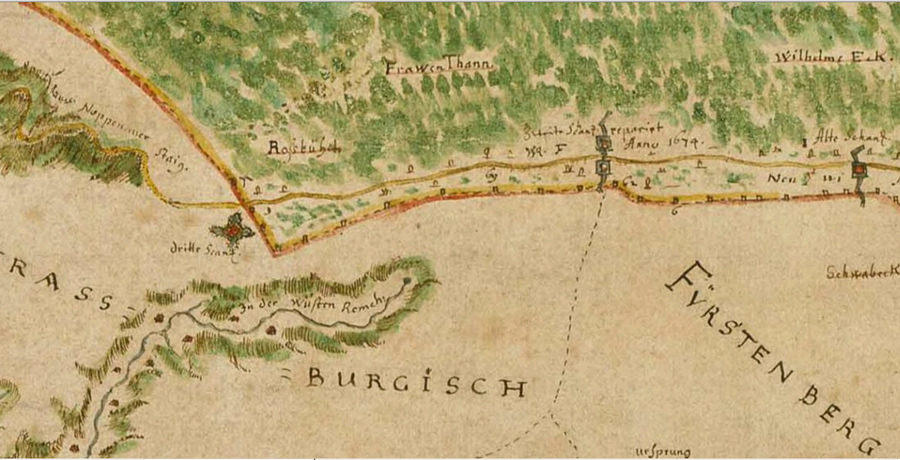
Excerpt from the map from Prelate Mayer

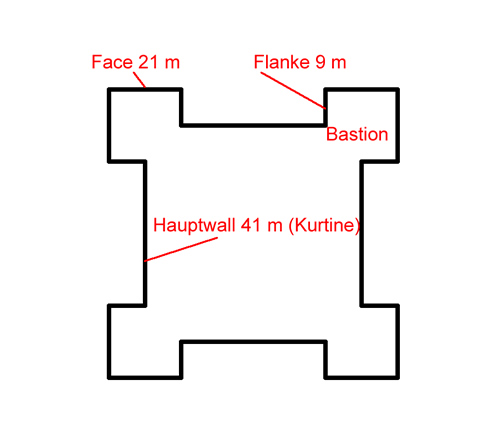
The Schwedenschanze's layout

The Schwedenschanze was built during the Thirty Years' War in 1632/1633 and is the oldest schanze on the top of the pass at the Zuflucht. It consisted of a square with bulwarks at the corners and was designed for a crew of 400 to 500 men. It was supposed to secure the Oppenauer Steige from above, but it was unfavorably laid out because the opponent could approach the hill unseen due to the surrounding forests and hilly terrain.

The Württemberg field camp in front of the Refuge Hotel, which would later be known as the Schwedenschanze, has its origins in 1593 at the time of the Strasbourg Bishops' War. The Duke of Württemberg had the western border of his country guarded by a permanent garrison stationed in the field camp. Many references in old maps and sources suggest that this encampment was in the same place as the Schwedenschanze.

== See also ==
- Redoubt
- Schanze
