= Freudenstadt =

- Town
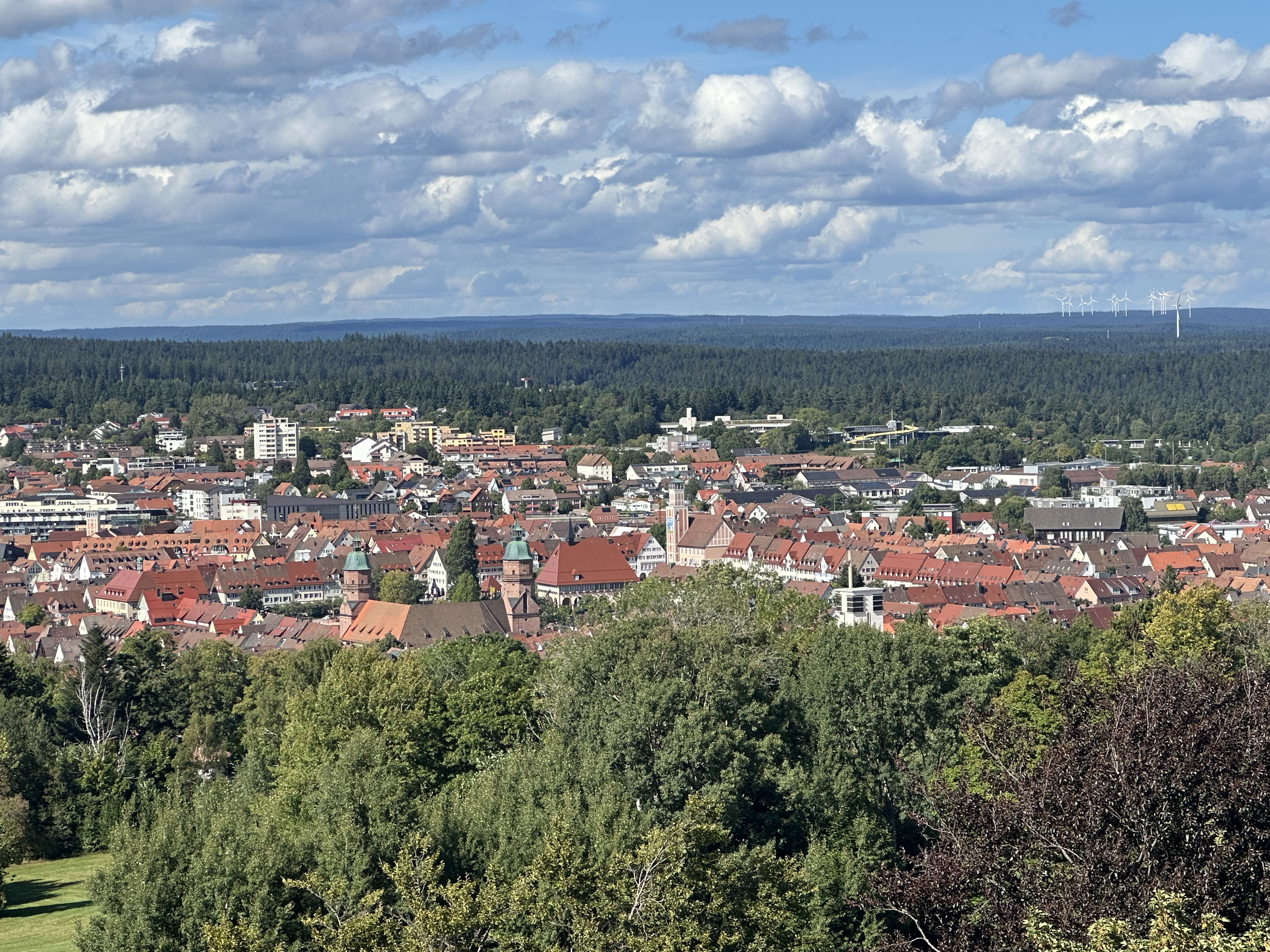

- Coat of arms

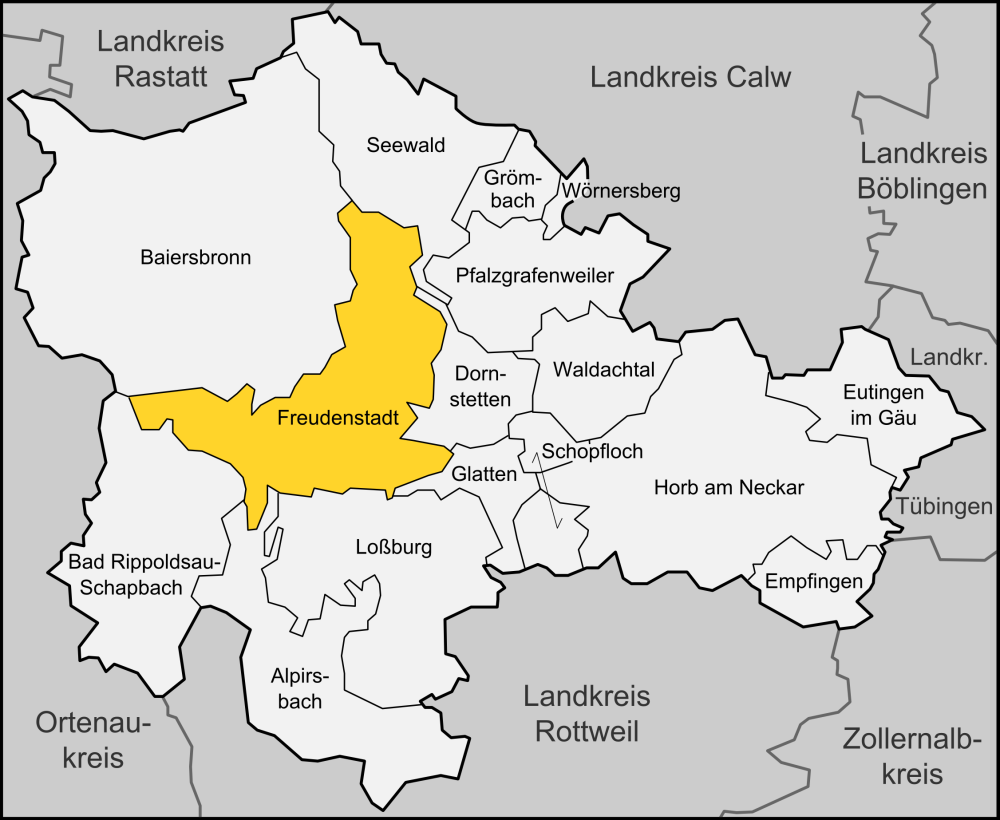
- Location of Freudenstadt within Freudenstadt district
- Interactive map of Freudenstadt
- Location within Germany Location within Baden-Württemberg
- Coordinates: 48°27′48″N 8°24′40″E
- Country: Germany
- State: Baden-Württemberg
- Admin. region: Karlsruhe
- District: Freudenstadt

Government
  - Mayor (2024–32): Adrian Sonder (CDU)

Area
  - Total: 87.54 km^{2} (33.80 sq mi)
- Elevation: 732 m (2,402 ft)

Population (2025-12-31)
  - Total: 24,537
  - Density: 280.3/km^{2} (726.0/sq mi)
- Time zone: UTC+01:00 (CET)
  - Summer (DST): UTC+02:00 (CEST)
- Postal codes: 72250
- Dialling codes: 07441, 07442, 07443
- Vehicle registration: FDS, HCH, HOR, WOL
- Website: www.freudenstadt.de

Official logo of the city of Freudenstadt

Freudenstadt (German pronunciation: [ˈfʁɔʏdn̩ˌʃtat]; Swabian: Fraidestadt) is a town in Baden-Württemberg in southern Germany. It is the capital of the district Freudenstadt. The closest population centres are Offenburg to the west (approx. 36 km away) and Tübingen to the east (approx. 47 km away).

The city lies on a high plateau at the east edge of the north Black Forest, and is well known for its fresh air. Its city centre is famous as the largest market place in Germany. After Horb, it is the second largest city of the Freudenstadt district. The city has an administration partnership with the communities Bad Rippoldsau-Schapbach and Seewald.

Freudenstadt is a climatic health resort of international renown. In the 19th and 20th centuries, visitors of note included George V of the United Kingdom, the Queen of Sweden, John D. Rockefeller, and the American writer Mark Twain. With its many hotels and guest houses, and its high-class cuisine, Freudenstadt remains a popular vacation spot for Germans from every part of the country. Among the many Germans of note who considered Freudenstadt a second home was the justice inspector Friedrich Kellner whose WWII diary is the subject of a Canadian documentary.

== History ==
Since 1535 a monastery church existed in Kniebis. The building of Freudenstadt was ordered by Frederick of Württemberg in 1599 with the initial population largely being made up of many of the 11,000 Protestants who left the Inner Austrian provinces by force or through self-exile beginning in 1598. The designer was architect Heinrich Schickhardt. In 1799 the monastery in Kniebis was burned down by the French. Because of the Württemberg foundation, Freudenstadt was almost entirely Protestant for a long time. The young church belonged to the dean's office as well as the church district Herrenberg within the Evangelical-Lutheran Church in Württemberg.

=== Third Reich and World War II ===
In World War II, on the nearly 1,000 meter high Kniebis, not far from the Alexanderschanze, a Command Center of the Armed Forces was built to defend the Western Front: the Führer's headquarters Tannenberg. Heavy anti-aircraft warfare positions with the associated supply and accommodation buildings were built in the area as part of the LVZ West (Western Air Defense Zone), especially on the Schliffkopf and the Hornisgrinde. In the Freudenstadt hospital many wounded were treated. Hitler's one-week visit to Tannenberg and Freudenstadt in 1940 (after the French campaign) at the inauguration of the headquarters was for propaganda, which was reported in newsreels. Thus, Freudenstadt including the nearby region in France, became a symbol of the Nazi regime and the French defeat, which in 1945 was to play an important role.

On 16 April 1945, three weeks before the war ended, the city was unexpectedly attacked by the troops of the 1st French army under General Jean de Lattre de Tassigny. There was large-scale destruction caused by bombing and shelling. Freudenstadt fell, with interruptions, for about 16 hours under artillery fire. No residents dared to go to meet the French troops to surrender the city, conversely the French troops expected considerable military resistance.

Since the water main line had been destroyed by US air strikes and the fire engines had been destroyed by shelling, fire spread easily. A handover took place only when French troops reached the town hall. There were several dozen civilian casualties; about 600 buildings, 95 percent of the town, were destroyed directly or indirectly during the night from 16 to 17 April and 1,400 families were made homeless. Over the next three days, during the occupation by French troops, there were many violent attacks by soldiers of the Moroccan units. According to a doctor, Renate Lutz, she alone treated over 600 raped women. According to witnesses, when the townsfolk complained, they were told it was war and that Freudenstadt had to burn for three days.

Many of the remaining buildings were then occupied by French troops. Many families lived in makeshift-roofed cellars. Overall, the average living space per inhabitant was reduced to less than eight square metres. The need was great, and the cleanup of the debris was initially slow.

== Municipal subdivisions ==
The borough of Freudenstadt is divided into the town of Freudenstadt with Christophstal and Zwieselberg (together 16,159 inhabitants) and the outlying districts of Dietersweiler and Lauterbad (2,256), Grüntal and Frutenhof (1,027), Igelsberg (254), Kniebis (947), Musbach (761) and Wittlensweiler (2,186). These are further divided into villages, hamlets, farms and individual houses.

== Climate ==
Climate data for Freudenstadt: 796.5m (1991−2020)
Month	Jan	Feb	Mar	Apr	May	Jun	Jul	Aug	Sep	Oct	Nov	Dec	Year
Mean daily maximum °C (°F)	2.2 (36.0)	3.3 (37.9)	7.2 (45.0)	11.9 (53.4)	16.0 (60.8)	19.6 (67.3)	21.5 (70.7)	21.4 (70.5)	16.8 (62.2)	12.0 (53.6)	6.4 (43.5)	3.0 (37.4)	11.8 (53.2)
Daily mean °C (°F)	−0.4 (31.3)	0.0 (32.0)	3.2 (37.8)	7.1 (44.8)	11.1 (52.0)	14.6 (58.3)	16.5 (61.7)	16.3 (61.3)	12.2 (54.0)	8.2 (46.8)	3.5 (38.3)	0.5 (32.9)	7.7 (45.9)
Mean daily minimum °C (°F)	−2.9 (26.8)	−2.9 (26.8)	−0.3 (31.5)	2.7 (36.9)	6.6 (43.9)	10.0 (50.0)	11.9 (53.4)	11.8 (53.2)	8.2 (46.8)	5.0 (41.0)	0.9 (33.6)	−1.8 (28.8)	4.1 (39.4)
Average precipitation mm (inches)	172.7 (6.80)	138.3 (5.44)	141.8 (5.58)	85.3 (3.36)	123.3 (4.85)	103.5 (4.07)	123.1 (4.85)	105.4 (4.15)	93.7 (3.69)	125.8 (4.95)	142.4 (5.61)	192.9 (7.59)	1,548.2 (60.94)
Average precipitation days (≥ 1.0 mm)	18.7	16.7	16.7	14.5	17.5	15.8	15.8	15	13.7	16.3	17.5	20.3	198.5
Average snowy days (≥ 1 cm)	21.6	21.2	15.0	4.1	0.2	0.0	0.0	0.0	0.0	0.7	6.3	17.1	87.2
Average relative humidity (%)	87.5	83.3	78.4	72.3	73.8	73.1	72.1	73.8	79.5	83.9	88.1	88.6	79.5
Mean monthly sunshine hours	64.7	85.2	134.7	171	191.2	211.9	224.2	216.2	163.1	112.5	69	54.5	1,698.2
Source: NOAA

== Main sights ==
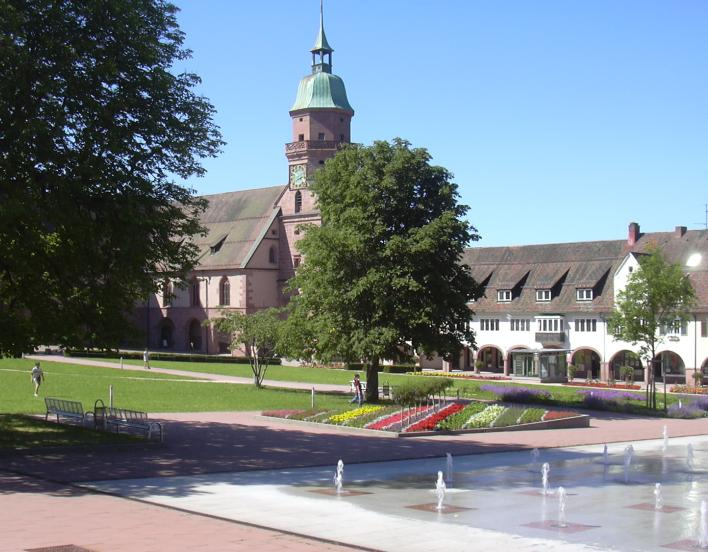
Market place and city church

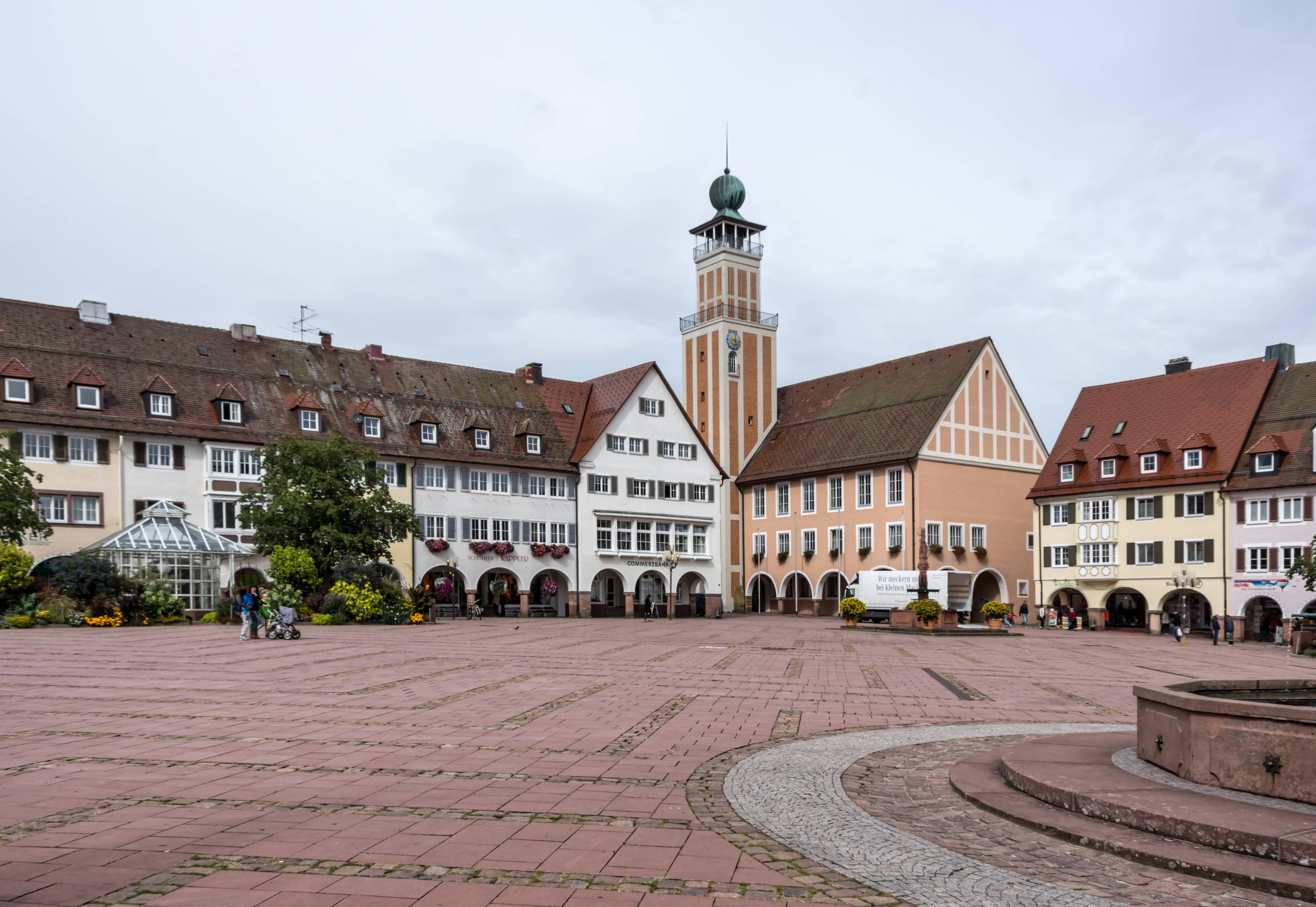
Market place (Freudenstadt)

The market place, flanked by arcaded houses, is the largest market place in Germany. The Rathaus (Town Hall), at the market place, houses the museum of local history.

On the south side of the market place is the Evangelical Lutheran Church, with its green tower roofs. It was built between 1601 and 1608, and is considered the most significant building of Freudenstadt. It was built in the Gothic/Renaissance style.

The Friedrichsturm (Frederick's Tower) is a 25m high tower which is built 799m above sea level on the Kienberg. It was built of red sandstone from the northern Black Forest in 1899 for the 300 year anniversary of Freudenstadt. On days with a clear sky it offers a view over the whole Murg valley, a view over Dornstetten and Schopfloch.

== Cultural and social life ==
The following social institutions are present: The children's and youth workshop EIGEN-SINN aims to promote personal, social and academic skills of children and adolescents in social group work. The Erlacher Höhe is committed to ensure that people will have respect and value in social need and to reduce social exclusion. The Diakonisches Werk works for the poor, marginalized and disadvantaged. In children's center Freudenstadt (KiJuz) open child and youth work is offered for primary school children and adolescents. The Catholic young community (KJG) Freudenstadt is involved in child and youth work. Regional daily newspapers are the Schwarzwälder Bote and the Neckar Chronik of the Südwest Presse.

== Economics ==
The value added comes in 2006 from the service sector (54,2%), the manufacturing industry (45,0%) and from agriculture (0,8%). 2007 were in the urban area 2,832 guest beds available. The number of overnight stays was 339,292.

The manufacturing sector is located mainly in the industrial areas. Particularly significant are the Gebrüder Schmid (photovoltaic, printed circuit boards, flat panel displays), the Robert Bürkle (equipment for surface finishing), the company Georg Oest mineral (mineral oil, gas stations, mechanical engineering).

== Roads ==
Due to the central location in the Black Forest, four federal roads lead through Freudenstadt. At the market place the B 28 (Kehl-Ulm) meets the B 462 (Rastatt-Rottweil). Here ends also the B 500 (Baden-Baden-Freudenstadt). Since 1985, the B 294 from Bretten to Gundelfingen bypasses Freudenstadt in a north–south direction.

== Bus and train ==
Freudenstadt is the starting point of three railway lines. In 1879 construction of the Eutingen im Gäu–Freudenstadt railway connected the city to the railway network. It runs from Stuttgart over Herrenberg and Eutingen im Gäu to Freudenstadt. Because continuation into the Kinzig valley was already planned (and as part of the Kinzig Valley Railway was carried out in 1886), the main station was built southeast of the city, relatively far from the center. In 1901 the Württemberg part of the Murg Valley Railway to Klosterreichenbach was built. The 60-meter higher Stadtbahnhof north of the center is a Standardized railway station. In 1928, a direct connection to Rastatt (Baden) was established.

Eutingen and Stuttgart are connected with the Gäubahn. There is a rail service every hour with consolidations in school transport. Since 2006, coming from Karlsruhe, S41 goes every two hours about Freudenstadt up to Eutingen where is connection to the Regional Express (RE) Stuttgart-Singen.

The connection to Offenburg is via the Kinzig Valley Railway. The trains of the Ortenau-S-Bahn (OSB), connect Freudenstadt hourly over Alpirsbach, Schiltach and Hausach to Offenburg. The central bus station (ZOB) with more than 40 bus lines is a main transport hub in the Black Forest. City buses run to destinations in the urban core. Public transport to towns in neighboring districts, such as to Oberndorf, Wolfach, Altensteig or Dornhahn. On the nights of Saturdays, Sundays and holidays an overnight bus service completes the night rail service.

== Administration ==
Freudenstadt is home of the Amtsgericht, which belongs to the court Rottweil and the superior court Stuttgart. It is the seat of the district office of the homonymous district and home to the majority of its administrative authorities. There is also a notary and a tax office. It is the seat of the church district Freudenstadt of the Evangelical-Lutheran Church in Württemberg.

== Education ==
The schools sponsored by the city are on the one hand the Kepler-Gymnasium and the Kepler secondary school. Southeast towards the central station is the Falken-Realschule, not far away from the Hartranft Elementary School. The Theodor-Gerhard-primary school with integrated Werkrealschule as a second primary school of the main town is located opposite to the Kepler schools. Among the schools sponsored by the district are the Eduard-Spranger-School, a business school with an economic high school, the Heinrich-Schickhardt school as industrial and technical school with a technical high school and Luise Büchner School as domestic school with a nutritional scientific school. The Christopher's School, a special school, is found north the building yard.

== Notable people ==
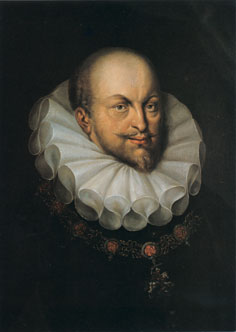
Frederick I, Duke of Württemberg

- Frederick I, Duke of Württemberg (1557–1608), founder of Freudenstadt in 1599
- Georg Lindemann (1884–1963), colonel general in World War II, died locally
- Klaus Mehnert (1906–1984), political journalist, publicist and author, died locally
- Margret Hofheinz-Döring (1910–1994), painter, lived locally, 1953–1974
- Michael Schultz (1951–2021), gallerist
- Michael Volle (born 1960), operatic baritone
- Anton Steck (born 1965), violinist and conductor
- Detlef Roth (born 1969), operatic bass-baritone
- Henriette Gaertner (born 1975), pianist; "the youngest concert pianist in the world"

=== Sport ===
- Ferdinand Grammel (1878-1951), road racing cyclist in Italy
- Karl Burger (1883–1959), footballer, died locally
- Kevin Kurányi (born 1982), footballer, played 431 games and 52 for Germany; graduated 1997 from Kepler secondary school
- Petra Lammert (born 1984), track and field athlete in the shot put discipline
- Sinan Tekerci (born 1993), footballer who has played over 300 games

== Twin towns – sister cities ==
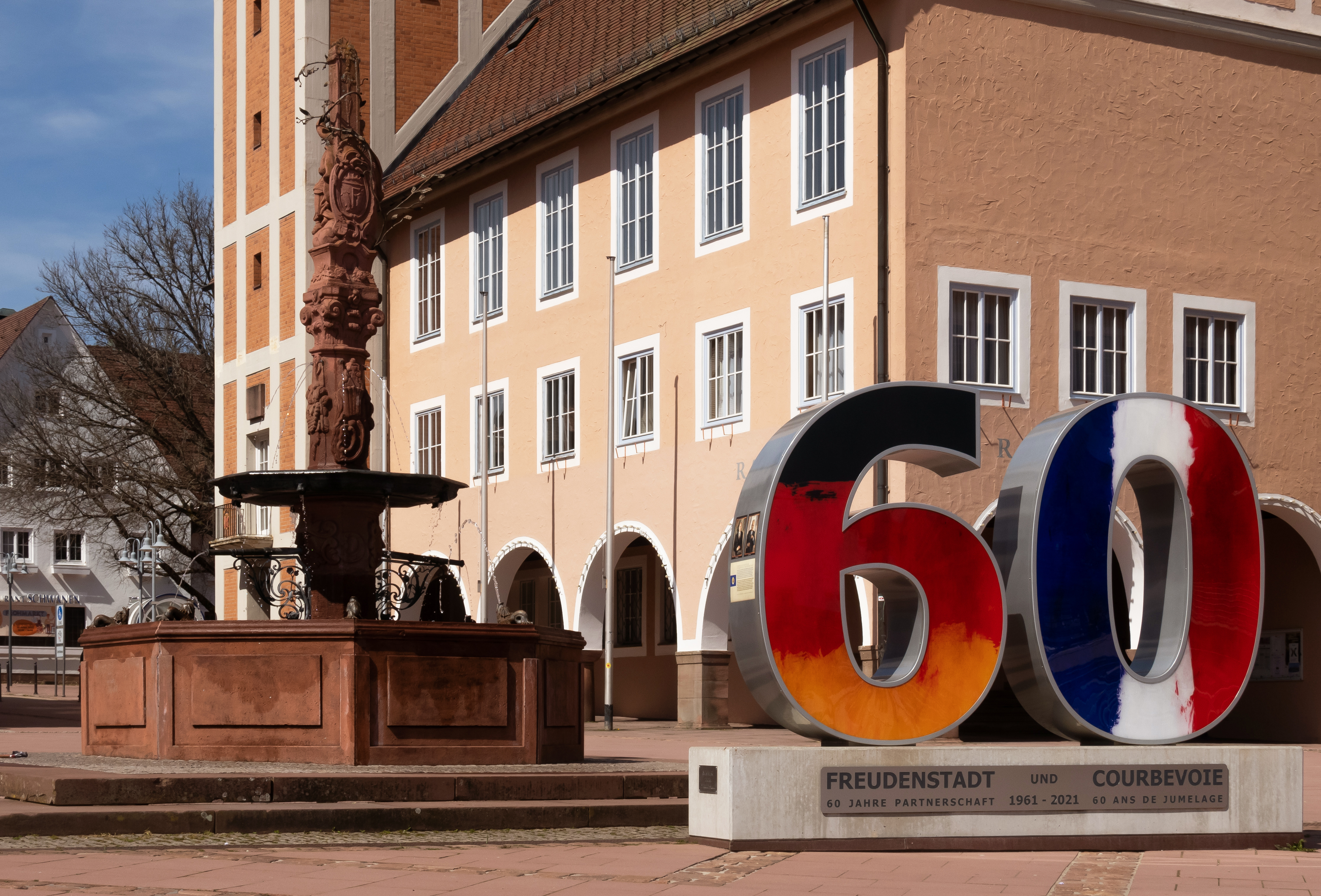
Freudenstadt, 60 years of connection with Courbevoie

Freudenstadt is twinned with:

- Courbevoie, France
- Männedorf, Switzerland
- Sandanski, Bulgaria
