= Bundesstraße 500 =

Federal highway in Germany

B 500
- Bundesstraße 500
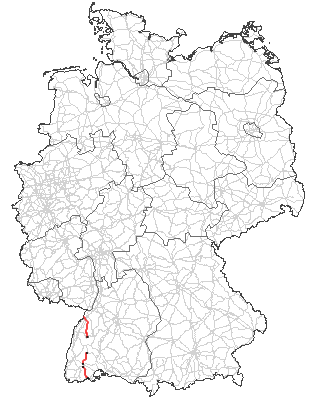

Route information
- Length: 233 km (145 mi)

Major junctions
- North end: Wintersdorf
- South end: Waldshut

Location
- Country: Germany
- States: Baden-Württemberg

Highway system
- Roads in Germany; Autobahns; List; Federal; List; State; E-roads

The Bundesstraße 500 (B500) is a German federal highway. Intended mainly as a tourist road, it traverses the heights of the Black Forest in a north-south direction.

While plans for this road surfaced as early as the 1930s, only the parts from Baden-Baden to Freudenstadt as well as from Triberg to Waldshut could be finished before the war began. When the Bundesstraße 500 was enacted in the 1970s, the road was extended to the French border with a crossing of the river Rhine. To this date, the gap between the two road segments has not been closed.
