= MiMa Mineralogy and Mathematics Museum =

Museum in Oberwolfach, Germany

Coordinates: 48°18′55.9″N 8°13′9.4″E

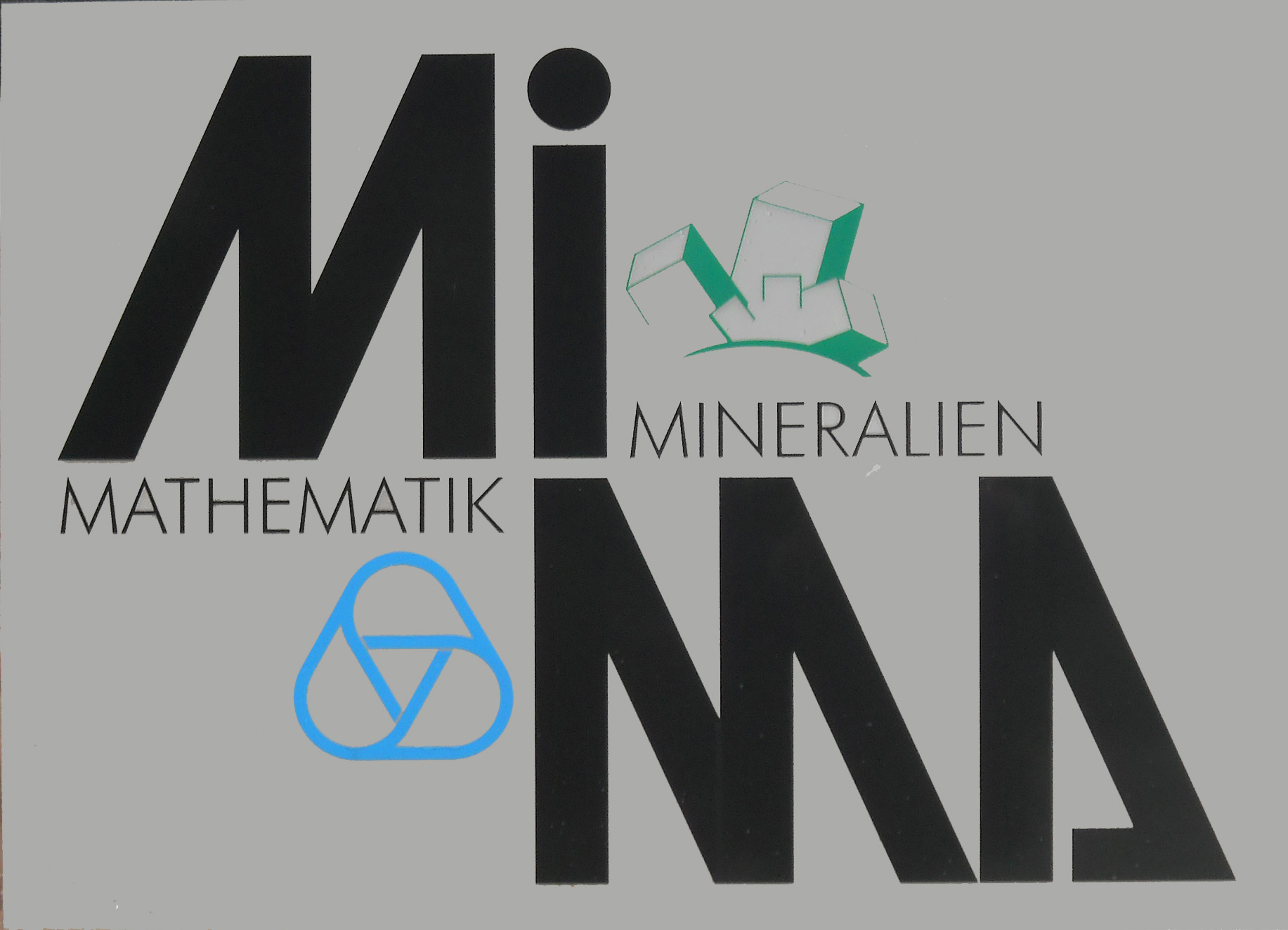

MiMa is a museum of mineralogy and mathematics in Oberwolfach, in the central Black Forest in southern Germany. The museum was opened on 30 January 2010 on the site of the mineral museum after a two-year conversion and expansion phase. It is operated jointly by the municipality of Oberwolfach, the Oberwolfach Society of the Friends of Minerals and Mining and the Mathematics Research Institute, Oberwolfach.

== Purpose ==
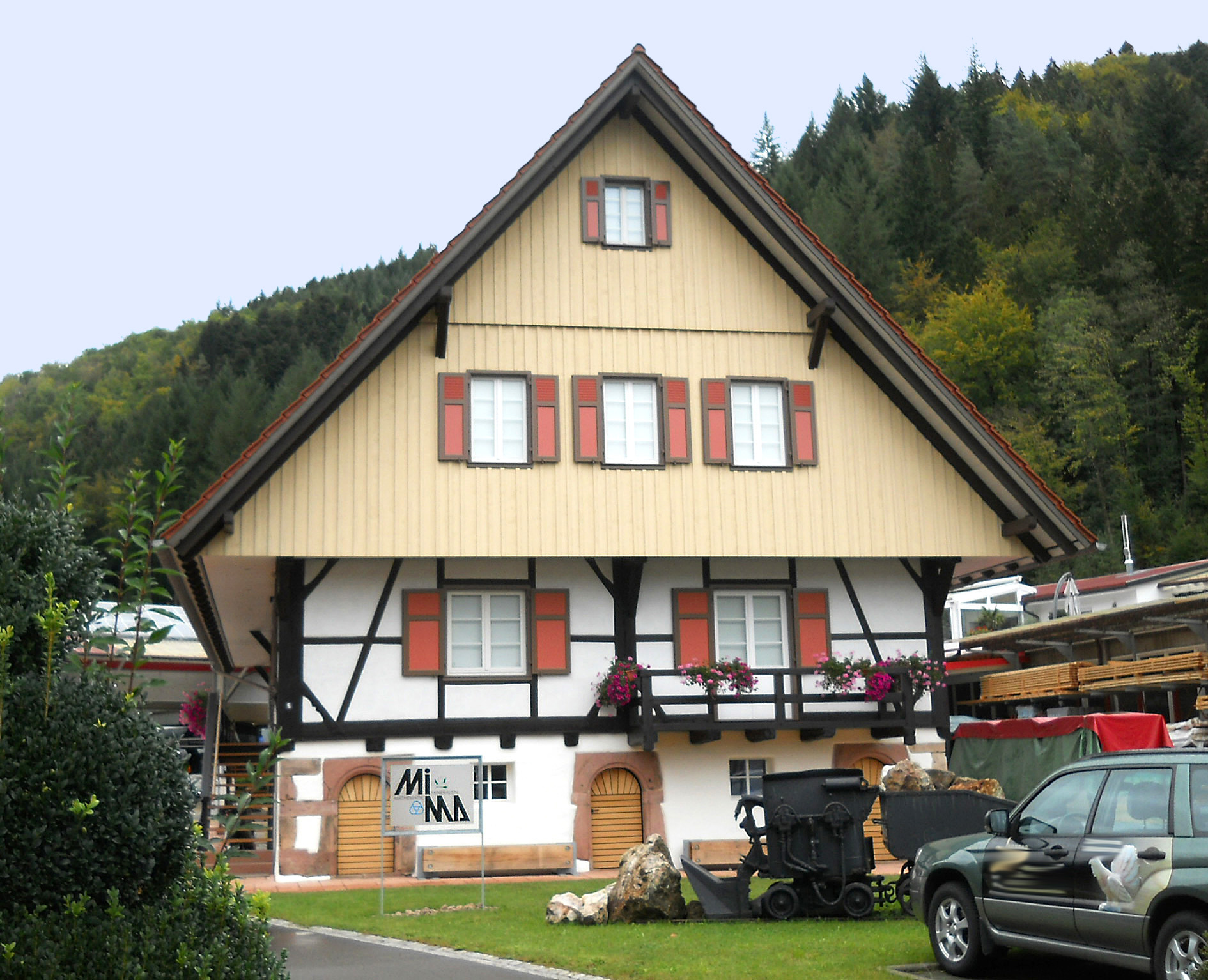

The idea is to unite the two distinct features of the region in one interactive museum: the Black Forest minerals of the Society of Friends of Minerals and Mining, Oberwolfach, the knowledge of the Mathematics Research Institute, Oberwolfach.

The museum not only displays minerals from the Black Forest and insights into mathematics, but also the links between these two fields. Interactive installations help to elucidate the themes of symmetry and crystallography.

== Minerals ==
The MiMa houses minerals and mining artefacts from the whole of the Black Forest with an emphasis on minerals from the nearby Clara Pit, using films and information. A scale model shows the interior of the mine with mining galleries and shafts down to sea level. There is information on the ores extracted and their technical usage.

Other exhibits:

- Exhibits from the historic silver mine of Wenzel in Oberwolfach, including mining lamps and tools.
- Collection of agates from the Artenberg and the Haslach Mining Region and collections from the Wittich Mining Region and from lodes in the southern Black Forest, including Wieden, Schauinsland and Münstertal.
- Computer system with minerals and literature databases, visitor binoculars. Display cabinet of minerals for sale from the Black Forest and other areas worldwide.

== Mathematics ==
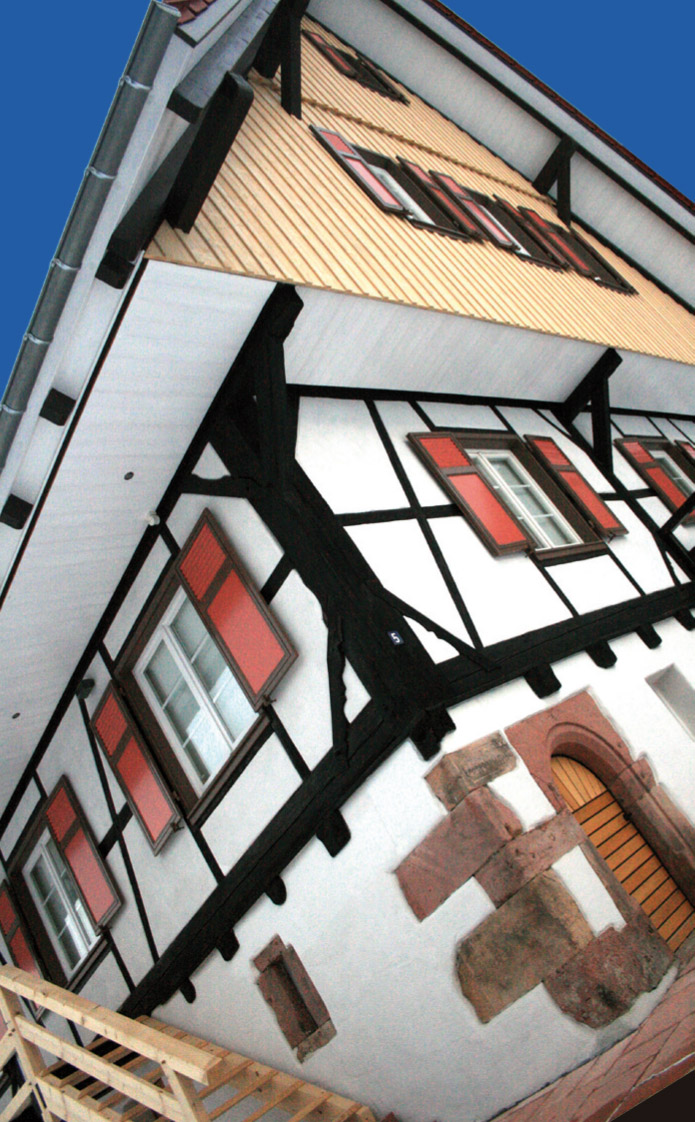
Front view of MiMa

In the field of mathematics, the subject areas of crystallography and symmetry are explained using interactive programmes. In addition, there is a selection of exhibits from the prize-winning exhibition IMAGINARY (Land of Ideas Prize, 2009) and an installation with historical information about the Oberwolfach Mathematical Research Institute.

Other exhibits:

- The programme Cinderella for creating symmetrical bodies and insights into the mathematics of crystals and solid bodies. It offers 3D flights through the atomic structure of quartz, fluorite and diamond.
- The IMAGINARY photo gallery with algebraic surfaces and mathematical works of art from Germany, Austria, the United States, Canada, Belgium and France.
- The programme Morenaments which enables interactive painting of symmetrical patterns. The Penrose Puzzle Game, a logic puzzle game and the video game jReality with a 3D mouse for discovering mathematical objects from differential geometry.

== Films and special exhibitions ==
In a film room, films from the world of minerals and mathematics are shown. The museum shop sells minerals and books. Special exhibitions and cultural events fill out the programme.
