= Wenzel Pit =

Coordinates: 48°19′12″N 8°12′21″E

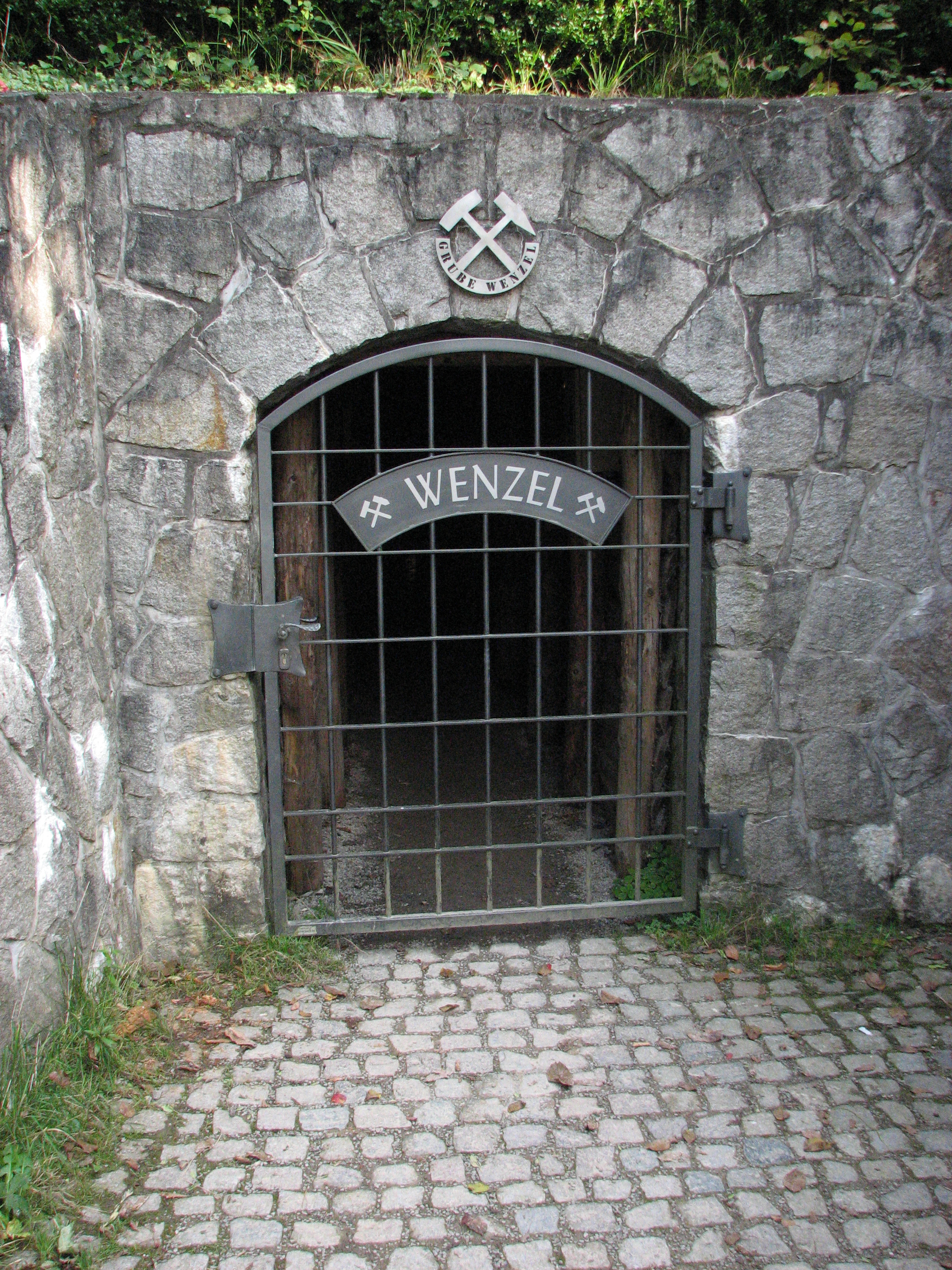
Adit portal of the Wenzel Pit

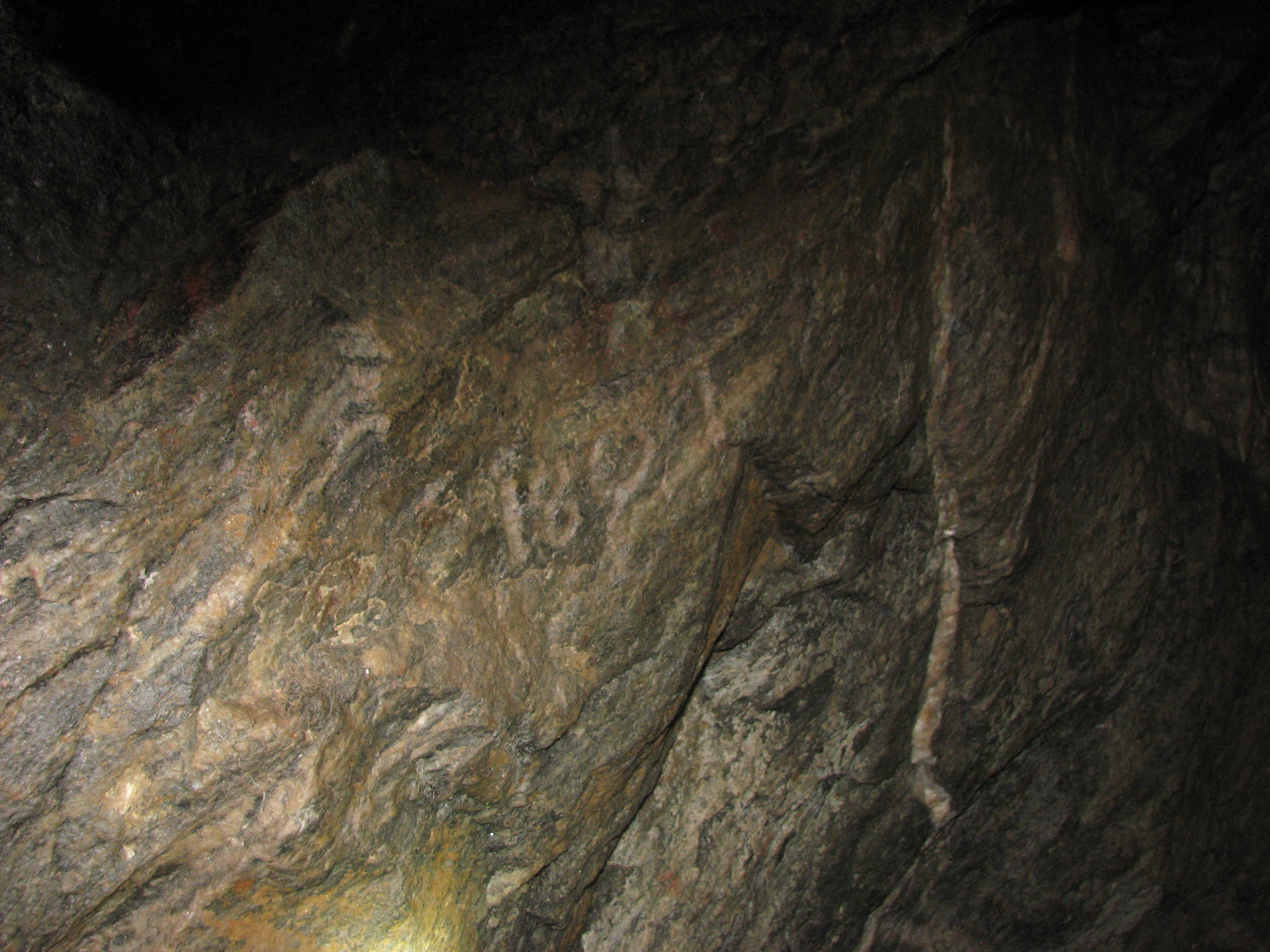
The year 1801 chiselled into the rock

The Wenzel Pit (German: Grube Wenzel) is a former silver mine in the Zinken Frohnbach in Oberwolfach in the Black Forest in southern Germany. The pit had its heyday in the Napoleonic era, but has been a show mine since 2001.

== History ==
Silver has been mined here since the early 14th century; but after several decades they could find no more and the mine was closed. Not until about 1760 was silver found again in the mineshafts under the direction of the principality mining clerk (Bergschreiber), Kapf. This prospecting work discovered several silver deposits and mining recommenced.

== Today ==
After the founding of the Show Mines Friends Association (Förderverein Besucherbergwerke) in 1997 the old silver mine was restored in 1999 and developed for visitors. In 2001 the work was completed and the show mine was opened to the public.
